= 15th Assam Assembly =

Indian state legislature since 2021

←	14th Assembly	16th Assembly	→

Overview
- Legislative body: Assam Legislative Assembly
- Term: 2021 – 2026
- Election: 2021
- Government: Sarma I
- Opposition: Indian National Congress
- Members: 126
- Speaker: Biswajit Daimary
- Leader of the House: Himanta Biswa Sarma
- Leader of the Opposition: Debabrata Saikia
- Party control: National Democratic Alliance

The 15th Legislative Assembly of Assam constituted on 1 June 2021, after the 2021 Assam Legislative Assembly elections which were concluded in April 2021, with the results being declared on 2 May 2021. The term of the previous Fourteenth Legislative Assembly of Assam ended on 31 May 2021.

== Office bearers ==
S.No	Position	Portrait	Name	Party	Constituency	Office Taken	Reference
1	Speaker		Biswajit Daimary	BJP	Panery	21 May 2021	
2	Deputy Speaker		Numal Momin	BJP	Bokajan	21 May 2021	
3	Leader of the House (Chief Minister)		Himanta Biswa Sarma	BJP	Jalukbari	10 May 2021	
4	Leader of the Opposition		Debabrata Saikia	INC	Nazira	21 May 2021	
5	Deputy Leader of the Opposition		Rakibul Hussain	INC	Samaguri	21 May 2021 – 11 June 2024	
5	Deputy Leader of the Opposition	Vacant					

== Members of the Legislative Assembly ==
District	No.	Constituency	Name	Party	Alliance	Remarks
Sribhumi	1	Ratabari (SC)	Bijoy Malakar	BJP	NDA	
Sribhumi	2	Patharkandi	Krishnendu Paul	BJP	NDA	
Sribhumi	3	Karimganj North	Kamalakhya Dey Purkayastha	BJP	NDA	Defected from INC to BJP.
Sribhumi	4	Karimganj South	Siddique Ahmed	INC	ASOM	
Sribhumi	5	Badarpur	Abdul Aziz	AIUDF	None	
Hailakandi	6	Hailakandi	Zakir Hussain Laskar	AIUDF	None	
Hailakandi	7	Katlicherra	Suzam Uddin Laskar	AIUDF	None	
Hailakandi	8	Algapur	Nizam Uddin Choudhury	AIUDF	None	
Cachar	9	Silchar	Dipayan Chakraborty	BJP	NDA	
Cachar	10	Sonai	Karimuddin Barbhuiya	AGP	NDA	
Cachar	11	Dholai (SC)	Parimal Suklabaidya	BJP	NDA	Resigned After Elected As MP
Cachar	11	Dholai (SC)	Nihar Ranjan Das	BJP	NDA	Elected in bypoll
Cachar	12	Udharbond	Mihir Kanti Shome	BJP	NDA	
Cachar	13	Lakhipur	Kaushik Rai	BJP	NDA	
Cachar	14	Barkhola	Misbahul Islam Laskar	INC	ASOM	
Cachar	15	Katigorah	Khalil Uddin Mazumder	INC	ASOM	
Dima Hasao	16	Haflong (ST)	Nandita Garlosa	BJP	NDA	
Karbi Anglong	17	Bokajan (ST)	Numal Momin	BJP	NDA	Deputy Speaker
Karbi Anglong	18	Howraghat (ST)	Darsing Ronghang	BJP	NDA	
Karbi Anglong	19	Diphu (ST)	Bidya Sing Engleng	BJP	NDA	
West Karbi Anglong	20	Baithalangso (ST)	Rupsing Teron	BJP	NDA	
South Salmara-Mankachar	21	Mankachar	Aminul Islam	AIUDF	None	
South Salmara-Mankachar	22	Salmara South	Wazed Ali Choudhury	INC	ASOM	
Dhubri	23	Dhubri	Najrul Hoque	AIUDF	None	
Dhubri	24	Gauripur	Nijanur Rahman	AIUDF	None	
Dhubri	25	Golakganj	Abdus Sobahun Ali Sarkar	INC	ASOM	
Dhubri	26	Bilasipara West	Hafiz Bashir Ahmed	AIUDF	None	
Dhubri	27	Bilasipara East	Samsul Huda	AIUDF	None	
Kokrajhar	28	Gossaigaon	Majendra Narzary	UPPL	None	Died on 26 May 2021
Kokrajhar	28	Gossaigaon	Jiron Basumatary	UPPL	None	Won in 2021 bypoll
Kokrajhar	29	Kokrajhar West (ST)	Rabiram Narzary	BPF	NDA	
Kokrajhar	30	Kokrajhar East (ST)	Lawrence Islary	UPPL	None	
Chirang	31	Sidli (ST)	Jayanta Basumatary	UPPL	None	Resigned after getting elected as MP
Chirang	31	Sidli (ST)	Nirmal Kumar Brahma	UPPL	None	Elected in bypoll
Bongaigaon	32	Bongaigaon	Phani Bhusan Choudhury	AGP	NDA	Resigned after getting elected as MP
Bongaigaon	32	Bongaigaon	Diptimayee Choudhury	AGP	NDA	Elected in Bypoll
Chirang	33	Bijni	Ajoy Kumar Ray	BJP	NDA	
Bongaigaon	34	Abhayapuri North	Abdul Batin Khandakar	INC	ASOM	
Bongaigaon	35	Abhayapuri South (SC)	Pradip Sarkar	INC	ASOM	
Goalpara	36	Dudhnai (ST)	Jadab Sawargiary	INC	ASOM	
Goalpara	37	Goalpara East	Abdul Kalam Rasheed Alam	INC	ASOM	
Goalpara	38	Goalpara West	Abdur Rasheed Mandal	RD	ASOM	
Goalpara	39	Jaleswar	Aftab Uddin Mollah	INC	ASOM	
Barpeta	40	Sorbhog	Manoranjan Talukdar	CPI(M)	ASOM	
Bajali	41	Bhabanipur	Phanidhar Talukdar	BJP	NDA	Elected in 2021 as AIUDF candidate, later resigned and defected to BJP and won the subsequent bypoll
Bajali	42	Patacharkuchi	Ranjeet Kumar Dass	BJP	NDA	
Barpeta	43	Barpeta	Abdur Rahim Ahmed	INC	ASOM	
Barpeta	44	Jania	Rafiqul Islam	AIUDF	None	
Barpeta	45	Baghbor	Sherman Ali Ahmed	AITC	None	Suspended from INC Then Joined Raijor Dal Again Joined Trinamool Congress
Barpeta	46	Sarukhetri	Jakir Hussain Sikdar	INC	ASOM	
Barpeta	47	Chenga	Ashraful Hussain	AIUDF	None	
Kamrup	48	Boko (SC)	Nandita Das	INC	ASOM	
Kamrup	49	Chaygaon	Rekibuddin Ahmed	INC	ASOM	
Kamrup	50	Palasbari	Hemanga Thakuria	BJP	NDA	
Kamrup Metropolitan	51	Jalukbari	Himanta Biswa Sarma	BJP	NDA	Chief Minister
Kamrup Metropolitan	52	Dispur	Atul Bora	BJP	NDA	
Kamrup Metropolitan	53	Gauhati East	Siddhartha Bhattacharya	BJP	NDA	
Kamrup Metropolitan	54	Gauhati West	Ramendra Narayan Kalita	AGP	NDA	
Kamrup	55	Hajo	Suman Haripriya	BJP	NDA	
Kamrup	56	Kamalpur	Diganta Kalita	BJP	NDA	
Kamrup	57	Rangia	Bhabesh Kalita	BJP	NDA	
Baksa	58	Tamulpur	Leho Ram Boro	UPPL	None	Died on 29 May 2021
Baksa	58	Tamulpur	Jolen Daimary	UPPL	None	Won in 2021 bypoll
Nalbari	59	Nalbari	Jayanta Malla Baruah	BJP	NDA	
Nalbari	60	Barkhetry	Diganta Barman	INC	ASOM	
Nalbari	61	Dharmapur	Chandra Mohan Patowary	BJP	NDA	
Baksa	62	Barama (ST)	Bhupen Baro	UPPL	None	
Baksa	63	Chapaguri (ST)	Urkhao Gwra Brahma	UPPL	None	
Udalguri	64	Panery	Biswajit Daimary	BJP	NDA	Speaker
Darrang	65	Kalaigaon	Durga Das Boro	BPF	NDA	
Darrang	66	Sipajhar	Paramananda Rajbongshi	BJP	NDA	
Darrang	67	Mangaldoi (SC)	Basanta Das	BJP	NDA	Defected from INC to BJP.
Darrang	68	Dalgaon	Mazibur Rahman	AIUDF	None	
Udalguri	69	Udalguri (ST)	Gobinda Chandra Basumatary	UPPL	None	
Udalguri	70	Majbat	Charan Boro	BPF	NDA	
Sonitpur	71	Dhekiajuli	Ashok Singhal	BJP	NDA	
Sonitpur	72	Barchalla	Ganesh Kumar Limbu	BJP	NDA	
Sonitpur	73	Tezpur	Prithiraj Rava	AGP	NDA	
Sonitpur	74	Rangapara	Krishna Kamal Tanti	BJP	NDA	
Sonitpur	75	Sootea	Padma Hazarika	BJP	NDA	
Biswanath	76	Biswanath	Promod Borthakur	BJP	NDA	
Biswanath	77	Behali	Ranjit Dutta	BJP	NDA	Resigned as MP
Biswanath	77	Behali	Diganta Ghatowal	BJP	NDA	Elected In Bypoll
Sonitpur	78	Gohpur	Utpal Borah	BJP	NDA	
Morigaon	79	Jagiroad (SC)	Pijush Hazarika	BJP	NDA	
Morigaon	80	Marigaon	Rama Kanta Dewri	BJP	NDA	
Morigaon	81	Laharighat	Asif Mohammad Nazar	INC	ASOM	
Nagaon	82	Raha (SC)	Sashi Kanta Das	BJP	NDA	Suspended from INC
Nagaon	83	Dhing	Aminul Islam	AIUDF	None	
Nagaon	84	Batadroba	Sibamoni Bora	INC	ASOM	
Nagaon	85	Rupohihat	Nurul Huda	INC	ASOM	
Nagaon	86	Nowgong	Rupak Sarmah	BJP	NDA	
Nagaon	87	Barhampur	Jitu Goswami	BJP	NDA	
Nagaon	88	Samaguri	Rakibul Hussain	INC	ASOM	Resigned after getting elected as MP
Nagaon	88	Samaguri	Diplu Ranjan Sarmah	BJP	NDA	Elected in Bypoll
Nagaon	89	Kaliabor	Keshab Mahanta	AGP	NDA	
Hojai	90	Jamunamukh	Sirajuddin Ajmal	AIUDF	None	
Hojai	91	Hojai	Ramkrishna Ghosh	BJP	NDA	
Hojai	92	Lumding	Sibu Misra	BJP	NDA	
Golaghat	93	Bokakhat	Atul Bora	AGP	NDA	
Golaghat	94	Sarupathar	Biswajit Phukan	BJP	NDA	
Golaghat	95	Golaghat	Ajanta Neog	BJP	NDA	
Golaghat	96	Khumtai	Mrinal Saikia	BJP	NDA	
Golaghat	97	Dergaon (SC)	Bhabendra Nath Bharali	AGP	NDA	
Jorhat	98	Jorhat	Hitendra Nath Goswami	BJP	NDA	
Majuli	99	Majuli (ST)	Sarbananda Sonowal	BJP	NDA	Resigned on 28 September 2021
Majuli	99	Majuli (ST)	Bhuban Gam	BJP	NDA	Won in 2022 bypoll
Jorhat	100	Titabar	Bhaskar Jyoti Baruah	INC	ASOM	
Jorhat	101	Mariani	Rupjyoti Kurmi	BJP	NDA	Elected in 2021 as INC candidate, later resigned and defected to BJP and won the subsequent bypoll
Jorhat	102	Teok	Renupoma Rajkhowa	AGP	NDA	
Sibsagar	103	Amguri	Prodip Hazarika	AGP	NDA	
Sibsagar	104	Nazira	Debabrata Saikia	INC	ASOM	Leader of Opposition
Charaideo	105	Mahmara	Jogen Mohan	BJP	NDA	
Charaideo	106	Sonari	Dharmeswar Konwar	BJP	NDA	
Sibsagar	107	Thowra	Sushanta Borgohain	BJP	NDA	Elected in 2021 as INC candidate, later resigned and defected to BJP and won the subsequent bypoll
Sibsagar	108	Sibsagar	Akhil Gogoi	RD	None	
Lakhimpur	109	Bihpuria	Amiya Kumar Bhuyan	BJP	NDA	
Lakhimpur	110	Naoboicha	Bharat Narah	Independent	None	
Lakhimpur	111	Lakhimpur	Manab Deka	BJP	NDA	
Lakhimpur	112	Dhakuakhana (ST)	Naba Kumar Doley	BJP	NDA	
Dhemaji	113	Dhemaji (ST)	Ranoj Pegu	BJP	NDA	
Dhemaji	114	Jonai (ST)	Bhubon Pegu	BJP	NDA	
Dibrugarh	115	Moran	Chakradhar Gogoi	BJP	NDA	
Dibrugarh	116	Dibrugarh	Prasanta Phukan	BJP	NDA	
Dibrugarh	117	Lahowal	Binod Hazarika	BJP	NDA	
Dibrugarh	118	Duliajan	Terash Gowalla	BJP	NDA	
Dibrugarh	119	Tingkhong	Bimal Bora	BJP	NDA	
Dibrugarh	120	Naharkatia	Taranga Gogoi	BJP	NDA	
Dibrugarh	121	Chabua	Ponakan Baruah	AGP	NDA	
Tinsukia	122	Tinsukia	Sanjoy Kishan	BJP	NDA	
Tinsukia	123	Digboi	Suren Phukan	BJP	NDA	
Tinsukia	124	Margherita	Bhaskar Sharma	BJP	NDA	
Tinsukia	125	Doomdooma	Rupesh Gowala	BJP	NDA	
Tinsukia	126	Sadiya	Bolin Chetia	BJP	NDA	
