= Mankachar =

- Census town
- Location in Assam, India Mankachar (India)
- Coordinates: 25°32′7.691″N 89°51′44.19″E
- Country: India
- State: Assam
- District: South Salmara Mankachar

Government
  - Deputy Commissioner: Bidyut Bikash Bhagawati, ACS
  - Superintendent of Police: Subodh Kumar Sonowal, APS
- Elevation: 27 m (89 ft)

Population (2001)
  - Total: 26,162

Languages
  - Official: Assamese
- Time zone: UTC+5:30 (IST)
- PIN: 783131
- ISO 3166 code: IN-AS
- Vehicle registration: AS-34

Mankachar is a census town in South Salmara-Mankachar District in the Indian state of Assam. It is exactly situated at the extreme south-westernmost end of the extreme north-easternmost state of India.

== Geography ==
Mankachar is located at 25.53°N 89.87°E. It has an average elevation of 27 m (89 ft). In the north there is Hatsingimari, in the east and south there is the state of Meghalaya and in the west there is the international border with Bangladesh.

== Politics ==
Mankachar is part of Dhubri (Lok Sabha constituency). It is the number 21 constituency of the Assam Legislative Assembly.

Major political parties are :

1. Indian National Congress - INC

2. All India United Democratic Front - AIUDF

3. Asom Gana Parishad - AGP

4. Socialist Unity Centre of India (Communist) - SUCI (C)

== Education centres ==
- Mankachar College
- J.M.H.S School, Mankachar
- A.A Latif Girls Institution, Mankachar
- Little Star English Academy
- Green Valley English Academy
- Gyann Peeth Jatiyo Vidyalaya
- Sonali Axom Jatiyo Vidyalaya
- Thakuranbari Jatiyo Vidyalaya
- Shishu Bikash Jatiyo Vidyalaya

== Medical centres ==
- Community Health Centre, Mankachar
- Brahmaputra Eye Care and Nursing Home, Mankachar
- Brahmaputra X-Rays, Mankachar
- Anju Health Care Diagnostic Centre
- Noor Enterprise (Wholesale Medicine Distributor)
- Mankachar Community Health Centre

== Notable people ==
- Aminul Islam, Member of the Legislative Assembly - Mankachar Assembly Constituency, General Secretary & Chief Spokesperson (AIUDF), Politician, Social Worker
- Kobad Hussain Ahmed, First Member of the Legislative Assembly of Mankachar Assembly Constituency, Politician
- Zahirul Islam, former Minister of Assam, Politician
- Aminul Islam, former Minister of Assam, Politician
