= Ilias Ali (Indian politician) =

Indian politician

Md Ilias Ali

Member of the Assam Legislative Assembly
- In office 2006–2021
- Preceded by: Abdul Jabbar
- Succeeded by: Mazibur Rahman
- Constituency: Dalgaon

Personal details
- Born: 1 March 1960 (age 66) Dalgaon, Assam
- Citizenship: India
- Party: Indian National Congress
- Spouse: Halima Begum (m. 1974)
- Relations: Idrish Ali (father), Kamala Begum (mother)
- Children: three
- Occupation: Politician
- Website: https://theiliasali.blogspot.com

Md Ilias Ali (born 1 March 1960) is an Indian politician and is a former member of the Assam Legislative Assembly from the Dalgaon constituency. Ali is a member of the Indian National Congress and a former Parliamentary Secretary of State.

Ali was elected a member of the Darrang Zila Parishad at the 2002 Assam panchayat elections. He was first elected to the Assam Legislative Assembly at the 2006 elections from the Dalgaon constituency as an independent, where he received 41,871 votes, 5,685 votes ahead of his nearest rival. He was re-elected at the 2011 elections, securing 62280 votes (44.31% of the total vote), and at the 2016 elections, where he polled 76,607 votes (42.48% of the total vote) winning by a 2,320 vote margin. He was appointed Parliamentary secretary for the Minister of Irrigation in the Tarun Gogoi-led government.

== Positions held ==
1. President, Bahabari Gaon Panchayat, 1978.
2. Honorary Deputy Advisor V.D.O. Darrang - 1982–1985.
3. Chairman, Darrang District Regulated Marketing Committee 1992–1998.
4. President (Elected), Fakirpara Gaon Panchayat 1992–1996.
5. Elected Member Darrang Zilla Parishad 2002–2006.
6. MLA 2006 to 2011 (12th Assembly)
7. MLA 2011 to 2016 (13th Assembly)
8. MLA 2016 to 2021 (14th Assembly)

== Social media handles ==
Facebook: https://www.facebook.com/iliasaliinc

Twitter: https://twitter.com/iliasaliinc?lang=en
