= Hatsingimari =

- Village in Assam
- Location in Assam, India Hatsingimari (India)
- Coordinates: 25.71647°N 89.89858°E
- Country: India
- State: Assam
- District: South Salmara Mankachar

Government
  - Type: Democratic
  - Body: Indian Government
  - Deputy Commissioner: Shri. Rahul Kumar Gupta, IAS
  - Superintendent of Police: Shri. Horen Tokbi, APS
  - MLA: Adv Aminul Islam, AIUDF
- Elevation: 28 m (92 ft)

Population (2011)
  - Total: 555,114

Languages
  - Official: Assamese
- Time zone: UTC+5:30 (IST)
- PIN: 783135
- Vehicle registration: AS-34

Hatsingimari is the headquarter of South Salmara-Mankachar District (Assam), India. Previously, it was the headquarter of South Salmara Mankachar Subdivision. On 26 January 2016, Assam's Chief Minister Tarun Gogoi announced South Salmara-Mankachar as an administrative district along with other 4 districts. On 9 February 2016, the district was inaugurated. It has a population of 3445 people (as per the 2011 census). It also has a Higher literacy rate of 77.73% as compared to the 73.72% of Assam.

== Etymology ==
The name Hatsingimari is derived from two different words Hat and Singimari. The word Hat means weekly market, and every Sunday a hat is held in the place, and that's why it got the word Hat in its name. The word Singimari means, "fishing of Cat fish" (Heteropneustes fossilis).

== Geography ==
Hatsingimari is located at the westernmost part of the south bank of Assam. To its South it is Mankachar town, to its West it is river Jinjiram a tributary of the Brahmaputra. Moreover, it shares its border with Meghalaya in the East. It is just 4 kilometres (2.5 mi) away from Indo-Bangladesh border. Its Bangladesh counterpart is Dantbhanga, Rowmari.

== Politics ==
Hatsingimari is the part of Dhubri (Lok Sabha constituency) whose present MP is AIUDF chief Badruddin Ajmal (as per 2019 elections). And, Hatsingimari is included 21, Mankachar constituency of the Assam Legislative Assembly, whose present MLA is Adv. Aminul Islam (AIUDF) 2021 (Assembly election) Dr. Motiur Rohman Mondal (as per 2016 elections). In grassroot levels, Hatsingimari is under Fulerchar Gram Panchayat and Sukchar Zila Parishad.

== Education ==
- Hatsingimari Junior College, Hatsingimari
- Hatsingimari College, Hatsingimari
- S. Ali HS School, Sukchar
- Janata HS School, Kharuabandha
- Nabadip High School, Sellakandi

== Market ==
The weekly market, or "Hat" is held every Sunday from 7am to 6pm. It is held over an area of 2 km^{2} and is recognised as one of the largest market in Assam. Each type of products has been assigned a specific place in the Hat, and these places are known as Hatii. For example, in Vegetable Hatii, only vegetables are sold. There are about 30-40 Hatii in the Hat and each Hatii contains more than 10-15 shops and all are always adjacent to each other. Livestock, Vegetables, Cashew, Iron and Steel Weapons, Timber, Fruits, Poultry, Jute, Rice Grain, Clothes, Toys, Pulses and Lentils, Various Spices, Fishes, Beef, Milk and Milk products, Furnitures, Clay products, Dry Fishes, Iron Items, Mechanical Items and various other products are sold and each category has a different Hatii.

=== Shopping Mall ===
There's a newly opened shopping mall in Hatsingimari, called M Baazar opened on 28th Dec 2019.

== Transportation ==
Hatsingimari is connected with Guwahati via Goalpara by National Highway 117B, which runs from Agia near Goalpara to Barengapara via Lakhipur, Mahendraganj in Meghalaya-Bangladesh Border. National Highway 117B(NH117B) runs for 231 kilometres (144 mi) to connect the Westernmost points of both Assam & Meghalaya. Once Dhubri-Phulbari bridge is completed, Hatsingimari will be more well-connected.

== Notable people ==
- Adv.Aminul Islam, MLA - 21 Mankachar Constituency, General Secretary & Chief Spokesperson (AIUDF), Politician, Social Worker
- Dr. Motiur Rohman Mondal, Ex MLA, Politician, Physician
- Zabed Islam, Politician, Ex MLA
