= Birsing Jarua Assembly constituency =

Assembly constituency of Assam

Birsing Jarua
- Constituency No. 9 for the Assam Legislative Assembly

Constituency details
- Country: India
- Region: Northeast India
- State: Assam
- Division: Lower Assam
- District: Dhubri and South Salmara-Mankachar
- Lok Sabha constituency: Dhubri
- Established: 2023
- Reservation: None

Member of Legislative Assembly
- 16th Assam Legislative Assembly
- Incumbent Wazed Ali Choudhury
- Party: Indian National Congress
- Elected year: 2026

Birsing Jarua Assembly constituency is one of the 126 assembly constituencies of Assam a north east state of India. Birsing Jarua is also part of Dhubri Lok Sabha constituency. It was previously Mankachar before 2023.

== Details ==
=== After 2023 ===
Area includes South Salmara and Jamadarhat Development blocks, and parts of Bilasipara, Birsing Jarua, and Chapar Salkocha development blocks.

== Members of Legislative Assembly ==
Year	Member	Political Party
2026	Wazed Ali Choudhury	Indian National Congress

== Election results ==
=== 2026 ===
2026 Assam Legislative Assembly election: Birsing Jarua
Party	Candidate	Votes	%	±%
INC	Wazed Ali Choudhury	113,901	41.53	
AIUDF	Ali Akbar Miah	78,016	28.45	
Independent	Reza Amin	68,556	25.00	
BJP	Madhavi Das	8,083	2.95	
The National Road Map Party of India	Akbar Ali Mondal	1384	0.50	
Socialist Unity Centre Of India (Communist)	Abdus Sobur Miah	541	0.20	
Vikas India Party	Mohar Uddin Mondal	314	0.11	
Apni Janta Party	Shahinoor Islam	468	0.17	
Independent	Rafiqul Islam	775	0.28	
NOTA	None of the above	2,225	0.81	
Margin of victory		35885	13.08	
Turnout		274,263		
INC gain from AIUDF		Swing		

== See also ==
- Mankachar
- Hatsingimari
- South Salmara-Mankachar District
- Dhubri district
- List of constituencies of Assam Legislative Assembly
- Government of Assam
- Government of India
