= 2016 Assam Legislative Assembly election =

Indian state election

- 4–11 April 2016

All 126 seats in the Assam Legislative Assembly 64 seats needed for a majority
- Turnout: 84.72% (▲8.68pp)
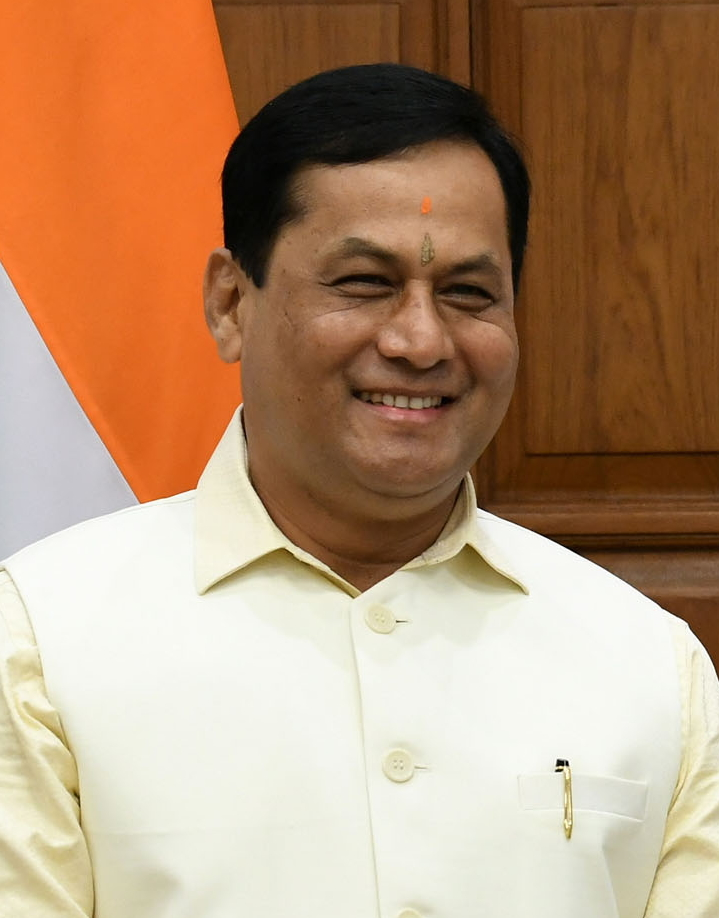

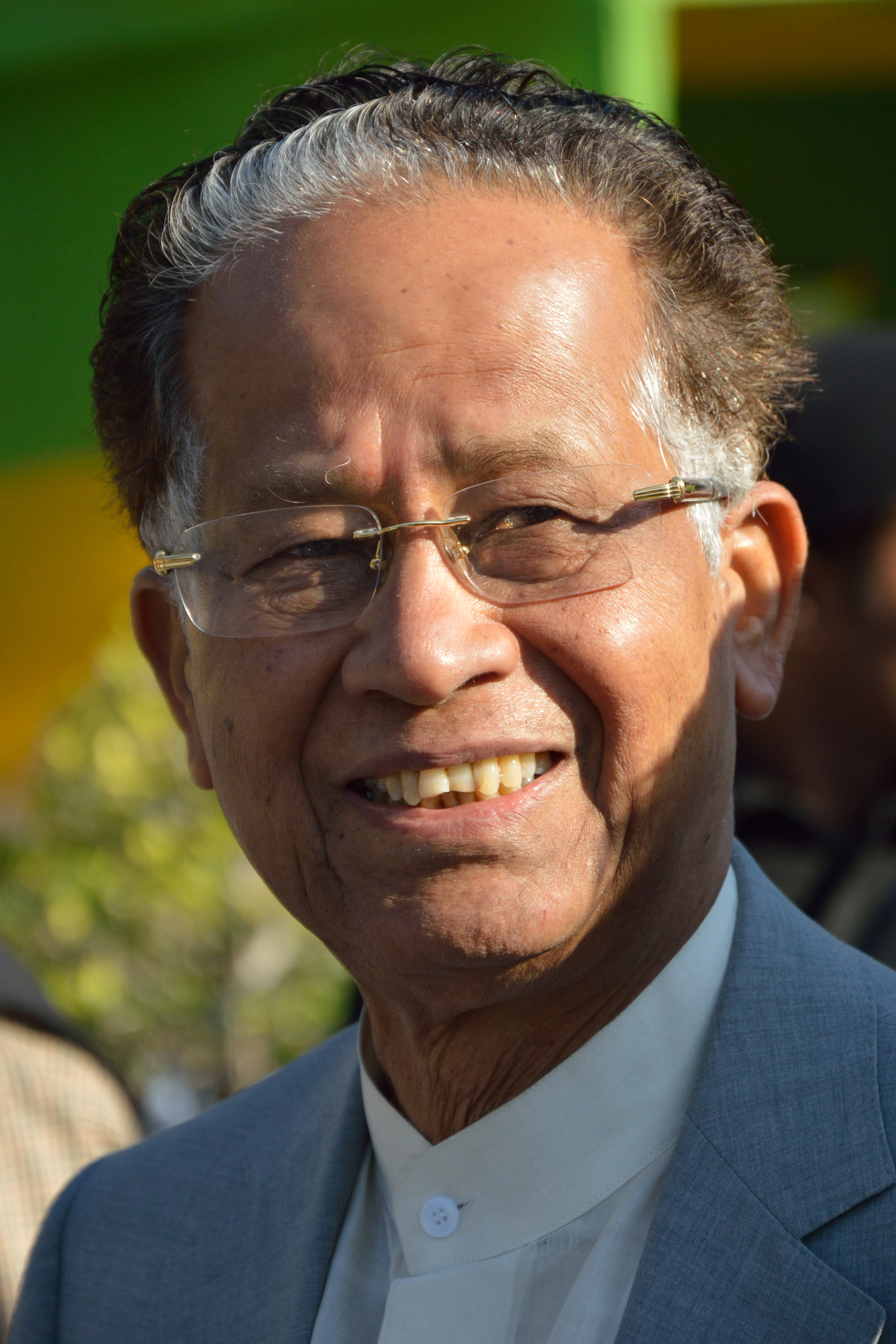

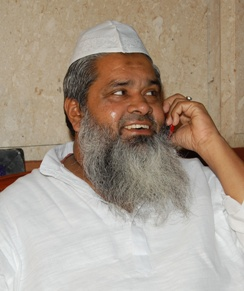
	Majority party	Minority party	Third party
Leader	Sarbananda Sonowal	Tarun Gogoi	Badruddin Ajmal
Party	BJP	INC	AIUDF
Alliance	NDA	UPA	-
Leader since	2016	1976	2005
Leader's seat	Majuli	Titabar	Salmara South (lost)
Last election	5	78	18
Seats won	60	26	13
Seat change	▲55	▼52	▼5
Popular vote	4,992,185	5,238,655	2,207,945
Percentage	29.51%	30.96%	13%

Chief Minister before election
Tarun Gogoi
INC
Elected Chief Minister
Sarbananda Sonowal
BJP

The Assam Legislative Assembly Election of 2016 was held in two phases, on 4 and 11 April 2016, to elect members of the 126 constituencies in Assam, a state in North-eastern India. The overall voter turnout was 84.72%, which set a new record for Assam. The turnout was an increase from the 2011 Assembly election figure of 75%.

The counting of votes and results declaration was completed on 19 May 2016. The election brought a change of power as the Indian National Congress (INC), which had formed the government under Tarun Gogoi since 2001, lost its majority to the Bharatiya Janata Party (BJP, lit "Indian People's Party") led by Sarbananda Sonowal. Sonowal became the first elected BJP chief minister in the Northeast, and his victory marked the start of other BJP victories in the Northeast, a region traditionally ruled by regional parties or the INC.

== Background ==
The term of the outgoing Assam assembly ended on 5 June 2016. The full bench of the Election Commission headed by Syed Nasim Ahmad Zaidi visited Assam on 21 December 2015. Voter-verified paper audit trails were introduced in 10 constituencies (approximately 2400 polling booths) in Assam assembly polls. These included the four assembly constituencies in Kamrup Metro district: Dispur, Jalukbari, Gauhati East and Gauhati West. 250 polling stations were made model polling stations.

=== Electoral process ===
An update to the National Register of Citizens of India (NRC) was to be completed by 1 January 2016, monitored by the Supreme Court of India. By September 2015, the first phase was completed; over 66.90 lakh (6,690,000) households submitted forms linking themselves to either the NRC of 1951 or any of the electoral rolls prior to 24 March 1971. It was to be followed by verifying the applications.

The effort was intended to detect and deport the illegal migrants who came from neighbouring Bangladesh on or after 25 March 1971. Since 1985, Foreigners' Tribunals have declared over 38,000 persons in Assam as illegal migrants. Nearly 1.5 lakh (150,000) names in Assam's electoral rolls carry the prefix "D" for "Doubtful" citizenship status. The Supreme Court directed the Assam Government to complete the final NRC by 1 March 2016. In May 2015, the historic India–Bangladesh land swap deal was signed, exchanging long-standing territorial enclaves and simplifying the border.

According to the draft electoral rolls published in October 2015, the total number of voters in Assam stood at 1.92 crores (19.2 million). The Election Commission said that the final electoral rolls would be published by 11 January 2016.

=== Religion data ===
According to the 2011 census, 61.5% were Hindus, 34.22% were Muslims. Christian minorities (3.7%) are mostly among some of the Scheduled Castes and Tribes (SC/ST) population. The Scheduled Tribe population (both ST(Plains) and ST(Hills) combined) in Assam is around 13% of which the Bodo people(an indigenous Assamese community) account for 40% and the Scheduled Caste population is about 7.4% of which the Kaibarta and Jal Keot (both indigenous Assamese communities) combined account for about 36%.

Out of 32 districts of Assam, 11 are Muslim majority according to the 2011 census. The districts are Dhubri, Goalpara, Barpeta, Morigaon, Nagaon, Hojai, Karimganj, South Salmara–Mankachar, Hailakandi, Darrang and Bongaigaon. Bodos have a population share of 12% and the Kaibarta and Jal Keot have a total share of about 10% (all of which are a part of the indigenous Assamese community). The share of the indigenous Assamese communities in Assam was about 47% in the 2001 census which has reduced to about 40-45% in 2016 as predicted by experts. Indigenous Assamese Muslims, also known as Khilonjia Muslims, include ethnic groups such as Goria and Moria, and are estimated to be around 40 lakhs in population out of a total 1 crore (4 million out of 10 million) Muslims in Assam.

== Parties and alliances ==
=== National Democratic Alliance ===
Party	Flag	Symbol	Leader	Contesting Seats	
Bharatiya Janata Party			Sarbananda Sonowal	84	86
Rabha Jatiya Aikya Manch			Dipak Rabha	1	86
Tiwa Jatiya Aikya Manch			Rama Kanta Dewri	1	86
Asom Gana Parishad			Brindaban Goswami	24	
Bodoland People's Front			Hagrama Mohilary	16	

=== United Progressive Alliance ===
Party	Flag	Symbol	Leader	Contesting Seats
Indian National Congress			Tarun Gogoi	122
United People's Party Liberal (Note: UPPL had contested as Independents supported by Congress on AC 29 Kokrajhar West, AC 30 Kokrajhar East, AC 31 Sidli and AC 63 Chapaguri constituencies.)			Pramod Boro	4

=== AIUDF-led alliance ===
Party	Flag	Symbol	Leader	Contesting Seats
All India United Democratic Front			Badruddin Ajmal	76
Janata Dal (United)			Nitish Kumar	12
Rashtriya Janata Dal			Lalu Prasad Yadav	12

== Campaign ==
In November 2015, Bharatiya Janata Party (BJP) President Amit Shah held a party workers' rally in Dibrugarh in Upper Assam Division. Union Minister and Lakhimpur MP Sarbananda Sonowal was made Assam BJP chief to head their election committee. Sonowal found the situation of illegal immigration from Bangladesh "very alarming". (Sonowal had led an effort to have the controversial Illegal Migrants (Determination by Tribunal) (IMDT) Act struck down by the Supreme court of India in December 2006, making deportations easier.) Himanta Biswa Sarma, a state Congress heavyweight joined BJP. BJP has aimed for 'Mission 84' in Assam. BJP led in 69 assembly constituencies in the Lok Sabha elections 2014 by winning 7 Lok Sabha seats in Assam. For the first time, the BJP had contested the Bodoland Territorial Council elections, and won a seat.

In December 2015, Indian National Congress (INC) Vice-president Rahul Gandhi visited Assam where he accused Rashtriya Swayamsevak Sangh (RSS, lit "National Volunteer Organisation") workers of not letting him enter Barpeta Satra temple in Barpeta district. RSS, widely regarded as the parent organisation of BJP, denied the charge. Gandhi announced that Tarun Gogoi would be the chief minister candidate of INC. Demand was growing for giving scheduled tribe (ST) status to six communities – Tai Ahoms, Koch Rajbongshis, Moran, Motok, Sootea and 36 tea tribes (the descendants of tea garden workers settled by British in the state from Chotanagpur plateau in the mid-19th century).

In November 2015, nine members of the legislative assembly left the INC and joined BJP. Assam Governor PB Acharya made a controversial statement that Hindustan is only for Hindus. Ex-United Liberation Front of Assam (ULFA) rebels announced that they would contest Assam polls. On 26 December 2015, BJP's Assam unit launched its 'Assam Nirman' initiative, seeking public opinion to prepare a vision document for development in Assam.

On 28 December 2015, Smriti Irani visited Barak Valley in Assam and accused the Tarun Gogoi government of not doing enough for women's safety. Gogoi accused the National Democratic Alliance (NDA) government of stalling tactics on granting citizenship to refugees from Bangladesh, claiming that they had been persecuted there. Gogoi said external affairs minister Sushma Swaraj met with businessmen in Assam during her visit instead of talking about the problems and issues confronting the state.

In January 2016, the Gogoi government announced rice prices at Rs 2 per kilogramme and to build all-religion bhawans. The Assam INC President ruled-out any alliance with All India United Democratic Front (AIUDF) or Asom Gana Parishad (AGP, lit "Assam Peoples Association") parties. Union Home Minister Rajnath Singh visited Assam on 3 January 2016 and said the fencing along the Indo-Bangladesh border would be completed by December 2016. A delegation of the All Assam Students Union (AASU) met Singh and visited the border areas. Rajnath Singh visited Dhubri district and expressed dissatisfaction with the fencing work there. He said that a feasibility study and two pilot projects were underway in the Dhubri sector of the riverine border. Gogoi said that 97.32% of the border fencing work in Karimganj and Dhubri was complete and asked the Central Government to take up a pilot project involving technological solutions to plug the riverine border.

Prime Minister Narendra Modi addressed a rally in Kokrajhar on 19 January 2016, after his visit to Sikkim on 18 January 2016. Modi formally announced the alliance of Bodoland People's Front (BPF) with BJP in Assam.

On 28 January, the BJP Parliamentary Board announced Sarbananda Sonowal as their Chief Ministerial candidate of Assam. Union minister of state for commerce and industry Nirmala Sitharaman accused Gogoi of spreading misinformation on the suspension of the North East Industrial and Investment Promotion Policy (NEIIPP), 2007. Ethnic groups of Assam sought ULFA pro-talks faction headed by founding general secretary Anup Chetia to help them receive ST designation.

Modi arrived on 5 February to first attend the 85th conference of the Srimanta Sankaradeva Sangha at the erstwhile Ahom capital of Sivasagar. Then he addressed a rally at Moran. Modi dedicated the Assam gas cracker project at Dibrugarh and inaugurated the 2016 South Asian Games in Guwahati on 5 February.

On 2 March, the BJP announced its alliance with AGP. AGP was given 24 seats. Gogoi announced a special package of Rs 3,000 cr (Rs 30 billion) for Barak Valley. Gandhi visited Assam for two days, 4–5 March 2016, and addressed public meetings in Silchar and Nagaon. On 6 March 2016, INC allied with Bodo-heartland-based United People's Party in a strategy to counter BJP's alliance with BPF.

On 10 March, BJP declared candidates for the first phase of Assam elections. Out of 126 Assembly constituencies, BJP contested 84 constituencies and left 42 to its four National Democratic Alliance (NDA) allies: AGP (24), BPF (16), Rabha Jatiya Aikya Manch (1) and Tiwa Jatiya Aikya Manch (1). BJP gave tickets to two ex-militants including Bhaskar Sarma (who was accused of secret killings). On 16 March 2016, Sarbananda Sonowal filed his nomination for the Majuli (ST) assembly seat. Modi addressed a rally in Majuli on 23 March 2016. INC released its first list of 65 candidates on 15 March 2016; the second list of 57 candidates was announced on 21 March 2016. INC contested 122 seats while its ally United People's Party contested the remaining 4 seats. BJP's Himanta Biswa Sarma filed nomination papers from Jalukbari on 21 March 2016. AIUDF contested around 76 seats while its allies in Assam – Rashtriya Janata Dal (RJD) and Janata Dal (United) (JD[U]) – contest 12 seats each. AIUDF chief Badruddin Ajmal ran for South Salmara seat, while Gogoi ran for the Titabar seat against BJP MP Kamakhya Prasad Tasa.

On 12 February 2016, the Election Commission of India announced that 10 assembly constituencies in Assam will have 2300 voter-verified paper audit trail (VVPAT) machines attached along with electronic voting machines (EVMs).

== Schedule ==
The dates of the election were announced on 4 March 2016. (In previous elections, all 140 constituencies went to polls on the same day.)

The polling was held in two phases, on 4 and 11 April 2016. The counting was scheduled for 19 May 2016 for both phases.

Schedule of polling and results
Phase 1	4 April 2016
Phase 2	11 April 2016
Counting of votes and result	19 May 2016

Assembly constituencies of Assam having VVPAT facility with EVMs
Silchar	Dhubri	Bongaigaon
Goalpara East	Jalukbari	Dispur
Gauhati East	Guahati West	Tezpur
Jorhat		

== Opinion polls ==
When conducted	Ref	Polling organisation/Agency	Sample size				
When conducted	Ref	Polling organisation/Agency	Sample size	INC	BJP+	AIUDF	Other
April 2016		India TV-C Voter	NA	53	55	12	6
March 2016		Nielsen	NA	36	78	10	2
March 2016		AVC	NA	40	48–54	25	0
January 2016		India TV-C-Voter	NA	44	57	19	6

=== Exit polls ===
Agency	INC+	BJP+	AIUDF	Others	Ref.
News Nation	47–51	63-67	7–11	NA	
C Voter	41	57	18	10	
Chanakya	27	90	9	NA	
ABP Nielsen	33	81	10	2	
NDTV Poll of Polls	37	73	12	4	

== Voting ==
Voter turnout was 84.72%. 87.03% polling was recorded in the second phase, the highest in Assam's history. One person was killed by police in Assam. 189 EVMs were replaced in the final phase due to technical issues. A total of 1,064 candidates contested the elections – 122 from INC, 89 from BJP, 74 from AIUDF, 30 from AGP, 13 from the BPF, 15 from CPI, 19 from CPM, 205 others and 497 Independents. The total number of polling stations in Assam was 24,890, spread across 50 election districts.

== Result ==
Alliance	Party	Popular vote			Seats		
Alliance	Party	Vote	%	±pp	Contested	Won	+/-
NDA	Bharatiya Janata Party	4,992,185	29.51	▲18.04	84	60	▲55
NDA	Asom Gana Parishad	1,377,482	8.14	▼8.15	24	14	▲4
NDA	Bodoland People's Front	666,057	3.94	▼2.19	16	12	Steady
NDA	Total	7,035,724	41.59	▲7.70	126	86	▲59
UPA	Indian National Congress	5,238,655	30.96	▼8.43	122	26	▼52
None	All India United Democratic Front	2,207,945	13.05	▲0.48	74	13	▼5
None	Independents	1,867,531	11.04	▲1.90	496	1	▼2
None	others	380,424	3.36			0	
None	None of the Above	189,085	1.12	New			
Total		16,919,364	100	N/A		126	
Valid votes		16,919,364	99.95				
Invalid votes		7,597	0.05				
Votes cast / turnout		16,926,961	84.67				
Abstentions		3,063,794	15.33				
Registered voters		19,990,755					

=== Results by constituency ===
Results (from Election Commission of India)
Assembly Constituency		Winner				Runner Up				Margin
#	Name	Candidate	Party	Votes	%	Candidate	Party	Votes	%	Margin
Karimganj District
1	Ratabari (SC)	Kripanath Mallah	BJP	59375	47.93	Akhil Ranjan Talukdar	INC	29449	26.15	24526
2	Patharkandi	Krishnendu Paul	BJP	46544	37.94	Debendra Kumar Sinha	AIUDF	32726	30.38	9268
3	Karimganj North	Kamalakhya Dey Purkayastha	INC	45289	34.63	Mission Ranjan Das	BJP	44821	34.27	468
4	Karimganj South	Aziz Ahmed Khan	AIUDF	58060	45.20	Siddique Ahmed	INC	53644	41.77	4416
5	Badarpur	Jamal Uddin Ahmed	INC	38266	34.01	Abdul Aziz	AIUDF	36178	32.15	2088
Hailakandi District
6	Hailakandi	Anwar Hussain Laskar	AIUDF	41647	36.86	Soumyajit Dutta Choudhury	BJP	39039	34.55	2608
7	Katlicherra	Suzam Uddin Laskar	AIUDF	50676	40.60	Gautam Roy	INC	35592	28.51	15084
8	Algapur	Nizam Uddin Choudhury	AIUDF	50531	42.32	Kaushik Rai	BJP	32777	27.45	17754
Cachar District
9	Silchar	Dilip Kumar Paul	BJP	94787	60.53	Bithika Dev	INC	54867	35.04	39920
10	Sonai	Aminul Haque Laskar	BJP	44236	35.83	Anamul Haque Laskar	INC	36683	29.71	7553
11	Dholai (SC)	Parimal Suklabaidya	BJP	68694	53.54	Girindra Mallik	INC	41857	32.62	26837
12	Udharbond	Mihir Kanti Shome	BJP	54204	48.33	Ajit Singh	INC	45598	40.65	8606
13	Lakhipur	Rajdeep Goala	INC	60135	55.00	Thoiba Singha	BJP	35768	32.71	24367
14	Barkhola	Kishor Nath	BJP	36482	34.90	Misbahul Islam Laskar	IND	36440	34.86	48
15	Katigorah	Amar Chand Jain	BJP	59764	44.04	Khalil Uddin Mazumder	AIUDF	50956	37.55	8808
Dima Hasao District
16	Haflong (ST)	Bir Bhadra Hagjer	BJP	52037	50.77	Nirmal Langthasa	INC	43731	42.67	8306
Karbi Anglong District
17	Bokajan (ST)	Numal Momin	BJP	40170	37.49	Klengdoon Engti	INC	35426	33.06	4744
18	Howraghat (ST)	Joyram Engleng	BJP	43378	44.19	Khorsing Engti	INC	36987	37.68	6391
19	Diphu (ST)	Sum Ronghang	BJP	64421	46.59	Bidya Sing Engleng	INC	36185	26.17	28236
West Karbi Anglong District
20	Baithalangso (ST)	Mansing Rongpi	INC	62596	42.84	Arun Terang	BJP	53077	36.33	9519
South Salmara District
21	Mankachar	Motiur Rohman Mondal	INC	54181	31.57	Aminul Islam	AIUDF	49868	29.06	4313
22	Salmara South	Wazed Ali Choudhury	INC	80066	54.43	Badruddin Ajmal	AIUDF	63343	43.06	16723
Dhubri District
23	Dhubri	Najrul Hoque	AIUDF	60933	40.08	Nazibul Umar	IND	36847	24.24	24086
24	Gauripur	Nijanur Rahman	AIUDF	73423	45.66	Banendra Mushahary	BPF	53512	33.28	19911
25	Golakganj	Ashwini Roy Sarkar	BJP	76444	46.20	Abdus Sobahan Ali Sarkar	INC	68253	42.25	6391
26	Bilasipara West	Hafiz Bashir Ahmed	AIUDF	44407	32.29	Ali Akbar Miah	IND	33205	24.15	11202
27	Bilasipara East	Ashok Kumar Singhi	BJP	59206	35.30	Amrit Badsha	INC	54110	32.26	5096
Kokrajhar District
28	Gossaigaon	Majendra Narzary	BPF	45516	31.93	Ravi Sankar Kasireddy	AIUDF	39476	27.69	6041
29	Kokrajhar West (ST)	Rabiram Narzary	BPF	64423	45.71	Dahit Chandra Brahma	AIUDF	47083	33.41	17340
30	Kokrajhar East (ST)	Pramila Rani Brahma	BPF	76496	55.34	Pratibha Brahma	IND	36405	26.34	40091
Chirang District
31	Sidli (ST)	Chandan Brahma	BPF	66037	42.00	Rwngwra Nazary	IND	57049	36.28	8988
Bongaigaon District
32	Bongaigaon	Phani Bhusan Choudhury	AGP	77292	56.03	Shankar Prasad Ray	INC	45972	33.33	31320
Chirang District
33	Bijni	Kamal Singh Narzary	BPF	29240	24.50	Ajoy Kumar Ray	BGP	27562	23.09	1678
Bongaigaon District
34	Abhayapuri North	Abdul Hai Nagori	INC	48354	35.38	Bhupen Roy	BJP	46211	33.81	2143
35	Abhayapuri South (SC)	Ananta Kumar Malo	AIUDF	51525	32.50	Chandan Kumar Sarkar	INC	51334	32.38	191
Goalpara District
36	Dudhnai (ST)	Dipak Rabha	BJP	79993	49.97	Sibcharan Basumatary	INC	51316	32.06	28667
37	Goalpara East	Abul Kalam Rasheed Alam	INC	57374	33.51	Gauranga Prasad Das	BJP	54793	32.00	2581
38	Goalpara West	Abdur Rashid Mandal	INC	61007	44.77	Sheikh Shah Alam	AIUDF	36668	26.91	24339
39	Jaleswar	Sahab Uddin Ahmed	AIUDF	56003	43.95	Aftab Uddin Mollah	IND	49341	38.45	6662
Barpeta District
40	Sorbhog	Ranjeet Kumar Dass	BJP	56454	33.34	Anurupa Hannan	INC	36928	21.81	19526
Bajali District
41	Bhabanipur	Abul Kalam Azad	AIUDF	28383	25.74	Phanidhar Talukdar	IND	25944	23.53	2439
42	Patacharkuchi	Pabindra Deka	AGP	64558	61.72	Sailen Kalita	INC	12582	12.03	51976
Barpeta District
43	Barpeta	Gunindra Nath Das	AGP	63563	38.96	A. Rahim Ahmed	INC	57753	35.40	5810
44	Jania	Abdul Khaleque	INC	86930	56.40	Rafiqul Islam	AIUDF	57194	37.11	29736
45	Baghbor	Sherman Ali Ahmed	INC	73340	57.58	Sheikh Abdul Hamid	AIUDF	29907	23.48	43433
46	Sarukhetri	Jakir Hussain Sikdar	INC	70062	45.06	Chittaranjan Barman	AGP	45815	29.46	24247
47	Chenga	Sukur Ali Ahmed	INC	51882	47.25	Monowara Khatun	AIUDF	28525	25.98	23357
Kamrup District
48	Boko (SC)	Nandita Das	INC	69986	39.66	Jyoti Prasad Das	AGP	52392	29.69	17594
49	Chaygaon	Rekibuddin Ahmed	INC	72211	49.66	Kamala Kanta Kalita	AGP	64390	44.28	7821
50	Palasbari	Pranab Kalita	BJP	75210	61.93	Nabajyoti Talukdar	INC	26468	21.80	48742
Kamrup Metropolitan District
51	Jalukbari	Himanta Biswa Sarma	BJP	118390	76.62	Niren Deka	INC	32455	21.01	85935
52	Dispur	Atul Bora	BJP	198378	71.14	Akon Bora	INC	68181	24.45	130197
53	Gauhati East	Siddhartha Bhattacharya	BJP	127602	78.49	Bobbeeta Sharma	INC	30965	19.05	96637
54	Gauhati West	Ramendra Narayan Kalita	AGP	132184	64.07	Jury Sharma Bordoloi	INC	42274	20.49	89910
Kamrup District
55	Hajo	Suman Haripriya	BJP	55096	40.76	Dulu Ahmed	INC	46188	34.17	8908
56	Kamalpur	Satyabrat Kalita	AGP	78170	57.70	Pranjit Choudhury	INC	41261	30.46	36909
57	Rangia	Bhabesh Kalita	BJP	58353	40.72	Ghanashyam Kalita	INC	26286	18.34	32067
Baksa District
58	Tamulpur	Emmanuel Mosahary	BPF	63031	42.87	Rabindra Biswas	INC	43084	29.30	19947
Nalbari District
59	Nalbari	Ashok Sarma	BJP	99131	62.93	Pradyut Kumar Bhuyan	INC	46087	29.26	53044
60	Barkhetry	Narayan Deka	BJP	69223	47.15	Diganta Barman	INC	60610	41.29	8613
61	Dharmapur	Chandra Mohan Patowary	BJP	70503	63.55	Nilamani Sen Deka	INC	36560	32.95	33943
Baksa District
62	Barama (ST)	Maneswar Brahma	BPF	45289	37.90	Rekha Rani Das Boro	IND	35493	29.70	9796
63	Chapaguri (ST)	Thaneswar Basumatary	BPF	43250	37.80	Sujan Das	IND	41769	36.51	1481
Udalguri District
64	Panery	Kamali Basumatari	BPF	38668	35.93	Nanda Ram Baro	IND	22866	21.25	15802
Darrang District
65	Kalaigaon	Maheswar Baro	BPF	47206	35.54	Nathu Ram Boro	AIUDF	29585	22.28	17621
66	Sipajhar	Binanda Kumar Saikia	BJP	65487	41.31	Zoii Nath Sarmah	INC	53312	28.91	12175
67	Mangaldoi	Gurujyoti Das	BJP	73423	42.48	Basanta Das	INC	51378	41.20	22045
68	Dalgaon	Ilias Ali	INC	76607	42.48	Mazibur Rahman	AIUDF	74287	41.20	2320
Udalguri District
69	Udalguri (ST)	Rihon Daimary	BPF	45037	40.94	Anjali Prabha Daimari	IND	20663	18.79	24374
70	Majbat	Charan Boro	BPF	48351	43.16	Teharu Gour	AIUDF	22133	19.76	26218
Sonitpur District
71	Dhekiajuli	Ashok Singhal	BJP	71425	49.57	Habul Chakraborty	INC	36430	25.28	34995
72	Barchalla	Ganesh Kumar Limbu	BJP	53912	45.00	Tanka Bahadur Rai	INC	30230	25.23	23682
73	Tezpur	Brindaban Goswami	AGP	71170	52.56	Hiranya Bhuyan	INC	36507	26.96	34663
74	Rangapara	Pallab Lochan Das	BJP	51597	43.92	Bhimananda Tanti	INC	28606	24.35	22991
75	Sootea	Padma Hazarika	BJP	60440	45.89	Praneswar Basumatary	INC	58622	44.51	1818
Biswanath District
76	Biswanath	Promod Borthakur	BJP	64225	52.33	Nurjamal Sarkar	INC	54105	44.09	10120
77	Behali	Ranjit Dutta	BJP	52152	56.20	Rupak Sarma	INC	28551	30.77	23601
Sonitpur District
78	Gohpur	Utpal Borah	BJP	85424	58.26	Monika Bora	INC	56489	38.53	28935
Morigaon District
79	Jagiroad (SC)	Pijush Hazarika	BJP	94550	54.98	Bibekananda Dalai	INC	66224	38.51	28326
80	Marigaon	Rama Kanta Dewri	BJP	80669	57.09	Jonjonali Baruah	INC	51046	36.13	26923
81	Laharighat	Nazrul Islam	INC	57904	41.40	Siddique Ahmed	AIUDF	52098	37.25	5806
Nagaon District
82	Raha (SC)	Dimbeswar Das	BJP	76941	47.60	Sashi Kanta Das	INC	43867	27.14	33074
83	Dhing	Aminul Islam	AIUDF	82786	47.78	Anwar Hussain	INC	58233	33.61	24553
84	Batadroba	Angoorlata Deka	BJP	46343	37.61	Gautam Bora	INC	40458	32.83	5885
85	Rupohihat	Nurul Huda	INC	72627	47.50	Nurul Amin Chowdhury	AIUDF	50783	33.21	21844
86	Nowgong	Rupak Sarmah	BJP	66706	47.43	Durlav Chamua	INC	53442	38.00	13264
87	Barhampur	Prafulla Kumar Mahanta	AGP	65768	48.43	Suresh Bora	INC	60599	44.63	5169
88	Samaguri	Rakibul Hussain	INC	66364	51.95	Jitu Goswami	BJP	51849	40.59	14515
89	Kaliabor	Keshab Mahanta	AGP	64759	62.03	Bindu Ganju	INC	26769	25.64	37990
Hojai District
90	Jamunamukh	Abdur Rahim Ajmal	AIUDF	65599	42.57	Rejaul Karim Chowdhury	IND	52195	33.87	13404
91	Hojai	Shiladitya Dev	BJP	105615	54.40	Dhaniram Thousen	AIUDF	49756	25.63	55849
92	Lumding	Sibu Misra	BJP	72072	46.05	Netra Ranjan Mahanta	INC	41672	26.62	30400
Golaghat District
93	Bokakhat	Atul Bora	AGP	62962	59.71	Arun Phukan	INC	22769	21.59	40193
94	Sarupathar	Roselina Tirkey	INC	67150	36.05	Binod Gowala	AGP	64223	34.48	2927
95	Golaghat	Ajanta Neog	INC	73862	50.17	Bitupan Saikia	BJP	68649	46.63	5213
96	Khumtai	Mrinal Saikia	BJP	57637	55.28	Bismita Gogoi	INC	40763	39.09	16874
97	Dergaon (SC)	Bhabendra Nath Bharali	AGP	63079	52.30	Aroti Hazarika Kachari	INC	46807	38.81	16272
Jorhat District
98	Jorhat	Hitendra Nath Goswami	BJP	69209	52.91	Rana Goswami	INC	55571	42.48	13638
Majuli District
99	Majuli (ST)	Sarbananda Sonowal	BJP	49602	50.74	Rajib Lochan Pegu	INC	30679	31.38	18923
Jorhat District
100	Titabar	Tarun Gogoi	INC	62025	54.65	Kamakhya Prasad Tasa	BJP	44530	39.23	17495
101	Mariani	Rupjyoti Kurmi	INC	36701	40.53	Alok Kumar Ghosh	NCP	34908	38.55	1793
102	Teok	Renupoma Rajkhowa	AGP	40928	42.88	Pallabi Saikia Gogoi	INC	35879	37.59	5049
Sibsagar District
103	Amguri	Prodip Hazarika	AGP	42010	43.75	Angkita Dutta	INC	40390	42.07	1620
104	Nazira	Debabrata Saikia	INC	52869	53.77	Prohlad Gowala	BJP	38014	38.66	14855
Charaideo District
105	Mahmara	Jogen Mohan	BJP	49036	47.50	Suruj Dehingia	INC	34711	33.63	14325
106	Sonari	Topon Kumar Gogoi	BJP	73327	55.83	Sarat Barkotoky	INC	49210	37.47	24117
Sibsagar District
107	Thowra	Kushal Dowari	BJP	41560	48.42	Sushanta Borgohain	INC	40334	46.99	1226
108	Sibsagar	Pranab Kumar Gogoi	INC	48584	42.87	Surabhi Rajkonwar	BJP	48042	42.39	542
Lakhimpur District
109	Bihpuria	Debananda Hazarika	BJP	66563	60.68	Bhupen Kumar Borah	INC	40376	36.81	26187
110	Naoboicha	Mamun Imdadul Haque Chawdhury	AIUDF	56003	34.52	Rao Gajendra Singh	BJP	54770	33.76	1233
111	Lakhimpur	Utpal Dutta	AGP	45917	33.88	Joy Prakash Das	INC	41762	30.82	4155
112	Dhakuakhana (ST)	Naba Kumar Doley	BJP	81556	55.45	Bharat Narah	INC	57014	38.77	24542
Dhemaji District
113	Dhemaji (ST)	Pradan Baruah	BJP	69592	40.90	Sumitra Patir	INC	50471	29.66	19121
114	Jonai (ST)	Bhubon Pegu	IND	88441	42.89	Aswini Pait	BJP	39148	18.98	49293
Dibrugarh District
115	Moran	Chakradhar Gogoi	BJP	54571	54.13	Paban Singh Ghatowar	INC	38340	38.03	16231
116	Dibrugarh	Prasanta Phukan	BJP	63985	61.02	Chandra Kanta Barua	INC	36611	34.91	27374
117	Lahowal	Rituparna Baruah	BJP	59013	53.86	Prithibi Majhi	INC	39414	35.97	19599
118	Duliajan	Terash Gowalla	BJP	58450	51.13	Dhruba Jyoti Gogoi	INC	41364	36.18	17086
119	Tingkhong	Bimal Bora	BJP	57072	54.61	Atuwa Munda	INC	38734	37.07	18338
120	Naharkatia	Naren Sonowal	AGP	46051	46.75	Pranati Phukan	INC	42520	43.17	3531
121	Chabua	Binod Hazarika	BJP	69351	59.76	Raju Sahu	INC	38597	33.26	30754
Tinsukia District
122	Tinsukia	Sanjoy Kishan	BJP	70937	61.24	Rajendra Prasad Singh	INC	35868	30.96	35069
123	Digboi	Suren Phukan	BJP	49167	51.47	Gautam Dhanowar	INC	34874	36.51	14293
124	Margherita	Bhaskar Sharma	BJP	76365	55.85	Pradyut Bordoloi	INC	53621	39.21	22744
125	Doomdooma	Durga Bhumij	INC	46938	45.40	Dilip Moran	BJP	46156	44.64	782
126	Sadiya	Bolin Chetia	BJP	38845	32.14	Birinchi Neog	INC	32279	26.71	6566

== Share ==
=== Seat Share ===
1. NDA (68.3%)
2. UPA (20.6%)
3. AIUDF (10.3%)
4. IND (0.79%)
1. NDA (41.9%)
2. UPA (31.0%)
3. AIUDF (13.0%)
4. CPM (0.55%)
5. CPI (0.22%)
6. Others (13.3%)

== Bypolls (2016–2021) ==
S.No	Date	Constituency	MLA before election	Party before election	Elected MLA	Party after election
20	19 November 2016	Baithalangso	Mansing Rongpi	Indian National Congress	Mansing Rongpi	Bharatiya Janata Party
113	9 April 2017	Dhemaji	Pradan Baruah	Bharatiya Janata Party	Ranoj Pegu	Bharatiya Janata Party
1	21 October 2019	Ratabari	Kripanath Mallah	Bharatiya Janata Party	Bijoy Malakar	Bharatiya Janata Party
74	21 October 2019	Rangapara	Pallab Lochan Das	Bharatiya Janata Party	Rajen Borthakur	Bharatiya Janata Party
106	21 October 2019	Sonari	Topon Kumar Gogoi	Bharatiya Janata Party	Nabanita Handique	Bharatiya Janata Party
126	21 October 2019	Jania	Abdul Khaleque	Indian National Congress	Rafiqul Islam	All India United Democratic Front

== See also ==
- 2016 elections in India
- 2011 Assam Legislative Assembly election
- Bangladeshis in India
- Illegal Migrants (Determination by Tribunal) Act, 1983
- National Register of Citizens of India
