= Assam Legislature =

Indian state legislature

- 16th Assam Assembly

Type
- Type: Unicameral
- Term limits: 5 years

History
- Founded: 27 March 1952 (74 years ago)

Leadership
- Governor of Assam: Lakshman Prasad Acharya since 30 July 2024
- Speaker of the house: Ranjeet Kumar Dass, BJP since 21 May 2026
- Deputy Speaker of the house: Habbey Teron, BJP since June 2026
- Leader of the house Chief Minister: Himanta Biswa Sarma, BJP since 12 May 2026
- Leader of the Opposition: Wazed Ali Choudhury, INC since May 2026
- Deputy Leader of the Opposition: Joy Prakash Das, INC since May 2026

Structure
- Seats: 126
- Political groups: Government (102) NDA (102): BJP (82); AGP (10); BPF (10); Official Opposition (19) ASOM (19): INC (19); Other opposition (5): RD (2); AIUDF (2); AITC (1)

Elections
- Voting system: First past the post
- Last election: 9 April 2026
- Next election: 2031

Meeting place
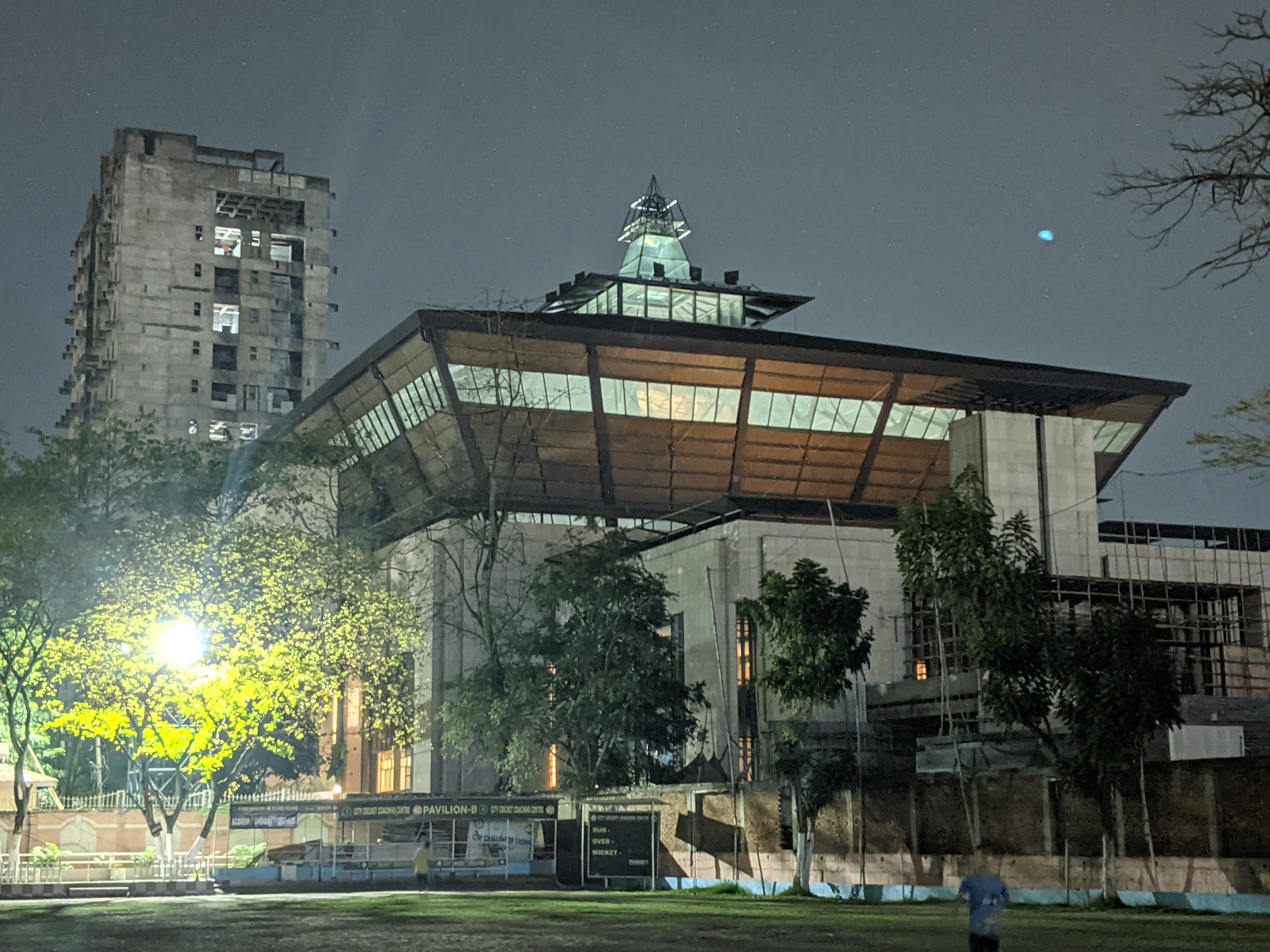
- Assam Legislative Assembly complex, Dispur, Guwahati, Assam, India - 781006.

Website
- https://assambidhansabha.org/ ]

The Assam Legislature is the unicameral legislature of the Indian state of Assam. The Legislature is composed of the Assam Legislative Assembly and the state's governor.

It was the unicameral legislature from 1913 to 1935 and then the upper house of the bicameral legislature from 1935 to 1947, when it was disbanded by the India (Provincial Legislatures) Order, 1947, and the Assam Legislative Assembly became unicameral.

On 14 July 2013, Assam Legislative Assembly passed a resolution for the creation of a Legislative Council in the state of Assam with 42 members. The Assam Legislative Council Bill, 2013 was introduced in the Rajya Sabha on 3 December 2013.

== See also ==
- Elections in Assam
- Government of Assam
