= Abdur Rahman Ajmal =

Indian politician (born 1983)

Member of Assam Legislative Assembly
- In office 13 May 2011 – 19 May 2016
- Preceded by: Wazed Ali Choudhury
- Succeeded by: Wazed Ali Choudhury
- Constituency: Salmara South

Personal details
- Born: Abdur Rahman Ajmal; 12 May 1983 (age 43) Mumbai, Maharashtra, India
- Party: All India United Democratic Front
- Spouse: Mushfika Ar Ajmal
- Parents: Badruddin Ajmal; Rehana Badruddin Ajmal
- Relatives: Abdur Rahim Ajmal (brother); Sirajuddin Ajmal (uncle); Hojai-782435
- Education: M.A. Islamic Law
- Occupation: politician businessman
- Profession: Politician; Businessman

Abdur Rahman Ajmal (born 12 May 1983) is an Indian politician and businessman. He is a former member of the Assam Legislative Assembly for the Salmara South constituency.

== Early life and family ==
Ajmal was born on 12 May 1983 to a Bengali Muslim family from Hojai in central Assam. The family trace their origins to the Sylhet district of eastern Bengal. His grandfather, Haji Ajmal Ali, was a businessman who moved to Mumbai in 1950 to try to succeed in the perfume industry using the oud plant. After the opening of the first store in the 1960s, the Ajmal perfume brand quickly grew to become a large brand in the Middle East. Ajmal's father, Badruddin Ajmal, is the founder of the All India United Democratic Front political party and the president of the Jamiat Ulema-e-Assam.

== Career ==
Ajmal contested the 2011 Assam Legislative Assembly election as an All India United Democratic Front candidate for Salmara South, defeating Wazed Ali Choudhury by 3756 votes.
