= Motiur Rohman Mondal =

Indian politician and physician

Member of Assam Legislative Assembly
- In office 2016–2021
- Preceded by: Zabed Islam
- Succeeded by: Adv. Aminul Islam
- Constituency: Mankachar
- In office 2006–2011
- Preceded by: Hosenara Islam
- Succeeded by: Zabed Islam
- Constituency: Mankachar

Personal details
- Born: Motiur Rohman Mondal; 1 April 1949 (age 77) Hatsingimari
- Party: Indian National Congress
- Spouse: Kohinur Begum
- Children: 3, including Mohibur Rohman
- Parent: Ismail Hossain Mondal
- Education: Cotton University, Gauhati Medical College and Hospital,(MBBS)
- Profession: Physician, politician

Motiur Rohman Mondal is an Indian politician and physician from Assam. He was elected to the Assam Legislative Assembly from Mankachar in the 2016 Assam Legislative Assembly election. He previously served from 2006 to 2011.
