= Hosenara Islam =

Indian politician (died 2024)

Member of Assam Legislative Assembly
- In office 2001–2006
- Preceded by: Aminul Islam
- Succeeded by: Dr.Motiur Rohman Mondal
- Constituency: Mankachar

Personal details
- Died: June 2024
- Party: National Congress Party
- Spouse: Zahirul Islam
- Children: 6, including Zabed

Hosenara Islam (died June 2024) was an Indian politician. She was elected to the Assam Legislative Assembly from Mankachar in the 2001 Assam Legislative Assembly election as a member of the Nationalist Congress Party. On 17 June 2024, a minister in the Assam cabinet announced on the social media that Islam had died.
