= Bholanath College =

College in India

Coordinates: 26.0259°N 89.9700°E

Bhola Nath College (Autonomous)
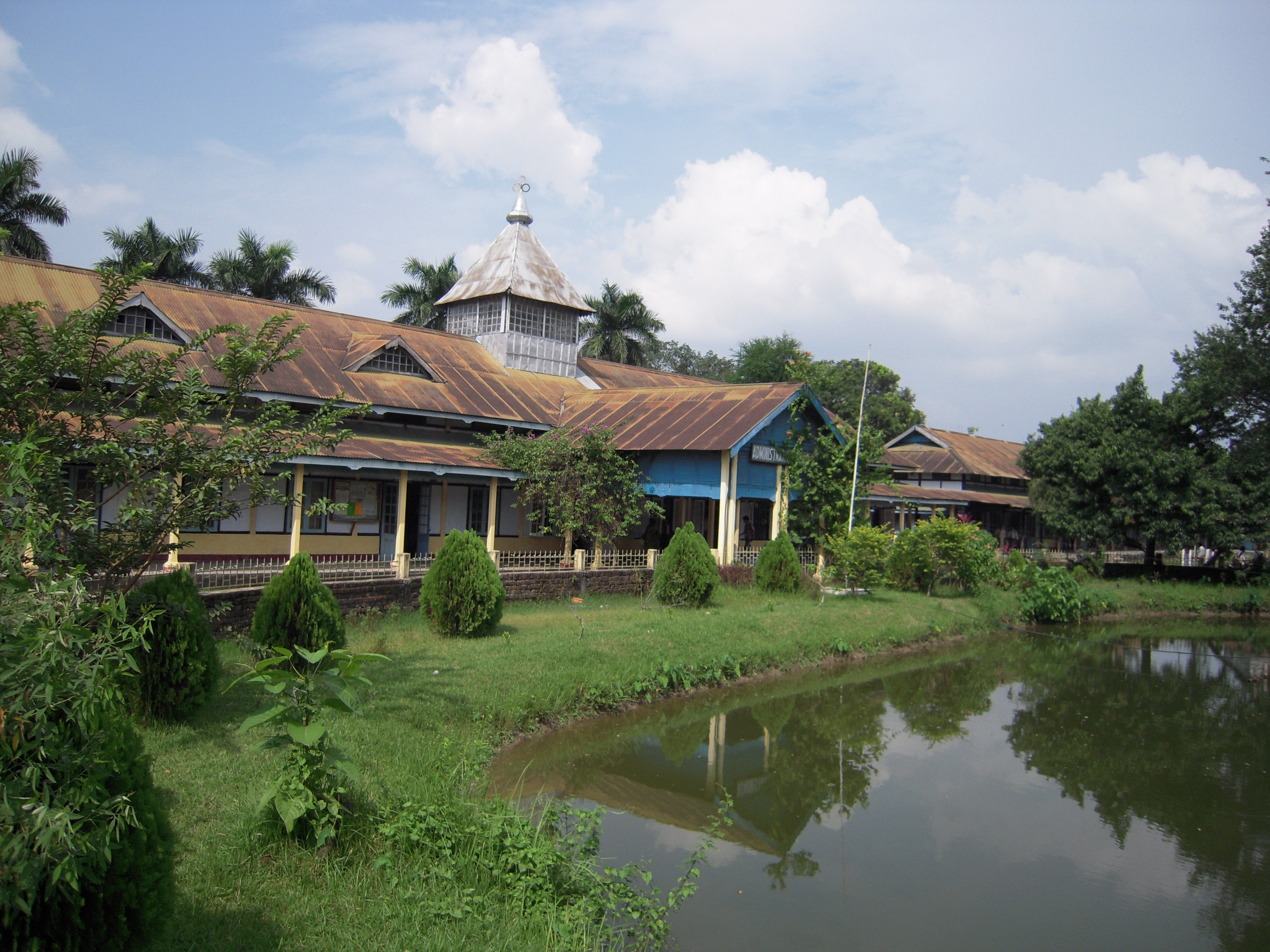
- Bhola Nath College administrative buildings
- Motto: श्रद्धावान् लभते ज्ञानम्
- Motto in English: "One with faith gains knowledge."
- Type: Public Institution
- Established: 1946 (80 years ago)
- Affiliations: Gauhati University
- Principal: Dr. Kishor Kr. Shah
- Administrative staff: 200+
- Location: Dhubri, Assam, India
- Campus: Urban, central Dhubri town
- Website: bncollege.co.in

B. N. College or Bhola Nath College of Dhubri is one of the oldest institutions of higher learning in Western Assam, India. The college was established in 1946 mainly from the donations of Lakhipur Estate Zamindar family of Late Bhola Nath Choudhury. Accordingly, the college was named as Bhola Nath College.The college is affiliated with Gauhati University. It was given autonomous status in July 2024.

== History ==
A public meeting held on 26 August 1944 at Dhubri Govt. High School premises under the president ship of Zahirul Huq Esqr, the then Deputy Commissioner of the Goalpara district, envisaged a college with both the arts and science stream at Dhubri. The meeting was attended by local personalities like Rai Bahadur B. M. Dutta, Rai Bahadur A. K. Ghosh, Fozor Udiin Ahmed, Khan Bahadur Abdul Mozid Ziaos Shames, R. K. Bose and Mvi. Jahanuddin Ahmed and finally culminated the movement with the birth of Bhola Nath College on 16 August 1946 under the prescribed syllabi of Calcutta University. The first principal of the college was Dr. Phani Bhusan Roy, a Ph.D.

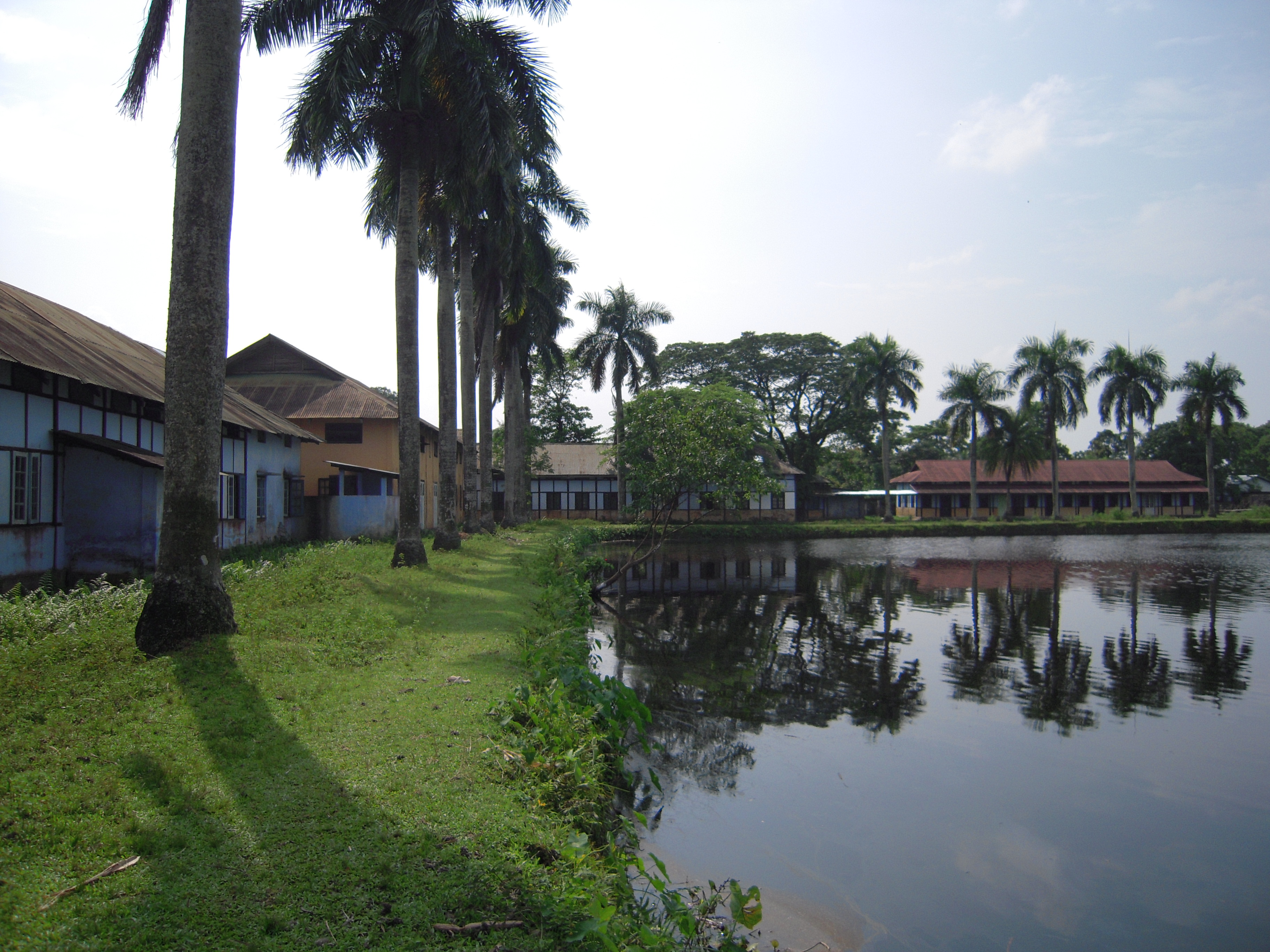
Bhola Nath College Science buildings and pond

== Campus ==
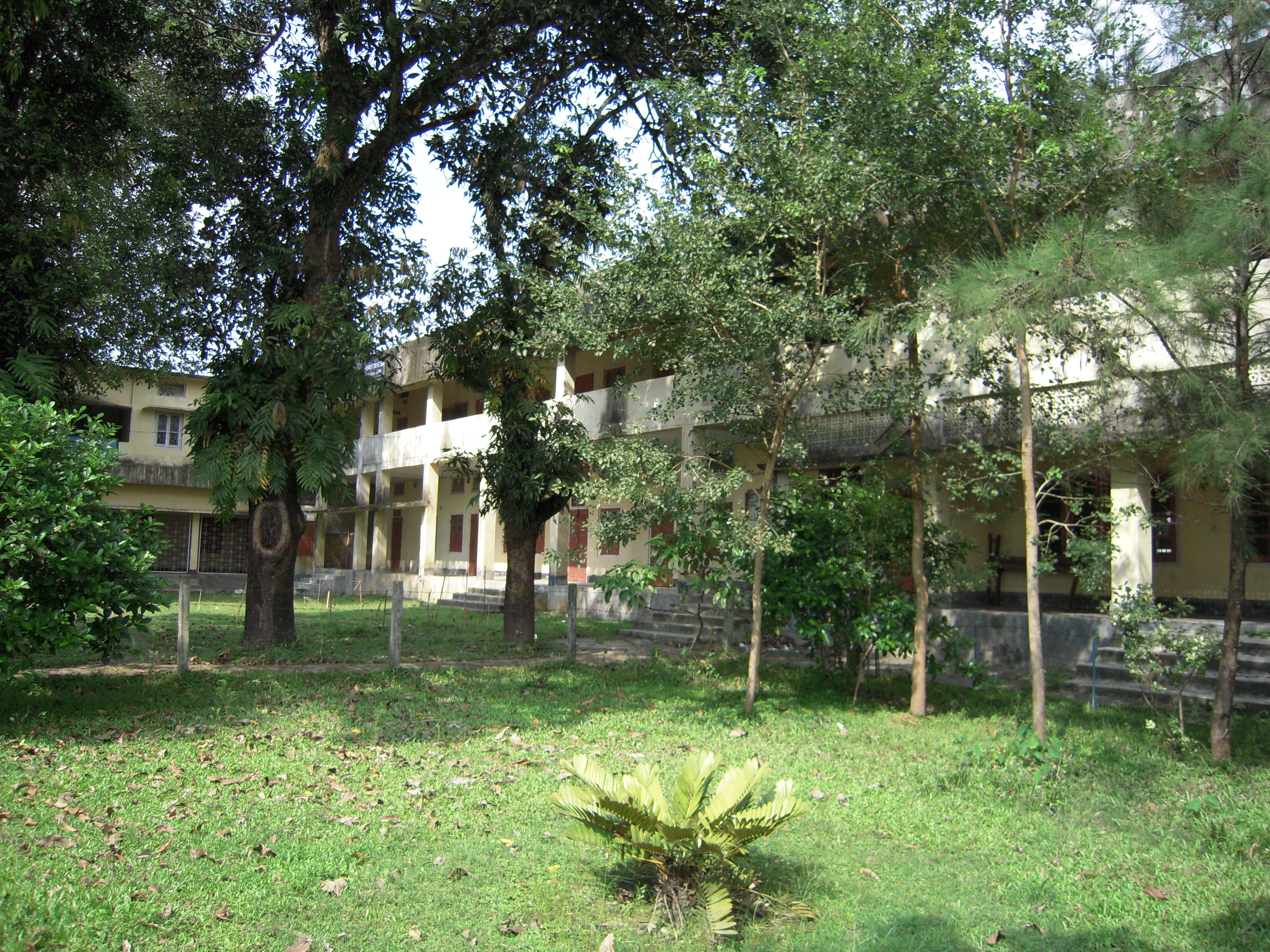
Bhola Nath College Library and Arts buildings

The college is situated on a sprawling campus of 18 acres (73,000 m^{2}) of land in the College Nagar and thus it has adequate sports infrastructure, extensive lawns, an administrative block, a central library, a hostel complex, a pond, a canteen, a health center along with well equipped science labs and computer facilities in one campus.

== Achievements ==
Since its inception in 1946, the college has gained and maintained the recognition of best institution of higher education in the entire western part of Assam under Calcutta University and now Gauhati University. Currently, it has 26 full-fledged departments under arts and science faculties besides vocational training centers and a center of Post Graduate Correspondence School. The college regularly organise national seminars and conferences. The National Assessment and Accreditation Council (NAAC) has accredited the college with 'A+' Grade in 2023.

== Education ==
At present the college imparts degrees (B.A., B.Sc., B.Voc (IT), B.Com and BCA) and certificates (HSSLC) in the following subjects or areas: Assamese, Arabic, Bengali, Education, Economics, English, Hindi, History, Philosophy, Political Science, Sanskrit, Botany, Biotechnology, Chemistry, Mathematics, Physics, Statistics, Zoology, Commerce and Bachelor of Computer Application.

=== Postgraduate ===
- M.Sc. in Chemistry
- M.A. in Assamese

== Notable alumni ==
- Abdul Hamid, three time Lok Sabha MP
- Adv.Aminul Islam, Current MLA - 21 Mankachar Constituency, General Secretary. Org & Chief Spokesperson (AIUDF), Politician, Social Worker
- Ashok Kumar Singhi, Politician
