= Zahirul Islam (politician) =

Indian politician

Member of Assam Legislative Assembly
- In office 1991–1996
- Preceded by: Aminul Islam
- Succeeded by: Aminul Islam
- Constituency: Mankachar
- In office 1978–1985
- Preceded by: Nurul Islam
- Succeeded by: Aminul Islam
- Constituency: Mankachar
- In office 1962–1972
- Preceded by: Kobad Hussain Ahmed
- Succeeded by: Nurul Islam
- Constituency: Mankachar

Personal details
- Party: Indian National Congress
- Other political affiliations: Independent (1962–1983); Janata party (1983–1985)
- Spouse: Hosenara Islam
- Children: Hashib Islam Rajib Islam Saqique Islam Zabed Islam Galib Islam Yasir Islam

Zahirul Islam is an Indian politician. He was elected Member of Assam Legislative Assembly from Mankachar constituency in Assam. He served five terms as MLA from 1962 till 1972 as an independent, from 1978 till 1983 as a member of Janata Party, and as a member of Indian National Congress for two terms during 1983 to 1985. He was reelected for the term from 1991 to 1996.
