= Kobad Hussain Ahmed =

Indian politician

Member of Assam Legislative Assembly
- In office 1952–1962
- Preceded by: Constituency Created
- Succeeded by: Zahirul Islam
- Constituency: Mankachar

Personal details
- Born: Kobad Hussain Ahmed
- Party: Indian National Congress

Kobad Hussain Ahmed was an Indian politician from Assam. He was elected Member of Assam Legislative Assembly from Mankachar. He was a two-term MLA from 1952 to 1962 as a member of the Indian National Congress.
