= Aminul Islam (Assam politician) =

Indian politician

Member of Assam Legislative Assembly
- In office 1996–2001
- Preceded by: Zahirul Islam
- Succeeded by: Hosenara Islam
- Constituency: Mankachar
- In office 1985–1991
- Preceded by: Zahirul Islam
- Succeeded by: Zahirul Islam
- Constituency: Mankachar

Personal details
- Born: Aminul Islam
- Party: National People's Party
- Other political affiliations: Asom Gana Parishad (1985-2006); Bhartiya Janata Party(2020-2021)
- Education: Gauhati University(MA)

Aminul Islam is an Indian politician and former lawmaker from Assam. He was elected to the Assam Legislative Assembly from Mankachar in the 1985 Assam Legislative Assembly election. He was also reelected to the Assam Assembly for the 1996–2001 term.
