= Mandia Assembly constituency =

Assembly constituency of Assam

- Constituency No. 22 for the Assam Legislative Assembly

Constituency details
- Country: India
- Region: Northeast India
- State: Assam
- Division: Lower Assam
- District: Barpeta
- Lok Sabha constituency: Dhubri
- Established: 2023
- Reservation: None

Member of Legislative Assembly
- 16th Assam Legislative Assembly
- Incumbent Sherman Ali Ahmed
- Party: All India Trinamool Congress
- Elected year: 2026

Mandia Assembly constituency is one of the 126 assembly constituencies of the Assam Legislative Assembly in India. This constituency forms part of the Dhubri Lok Sabha constituency. It was newly formed in 2023.

== Election Results ==
=== 2026 ===
2026 Assam Legislative Assembly election: Mandia
Party	Candidate	Votes	%	±%
AITC	Sherman Ali Ahmed	113,480	43.07	
INC	Abdul Khaleque	85,919	32.61	
AIUDF	Rafiqul Islam	49,174	18.66	
BJP	Badal Chandra Arya	9,801	3.72	
NOTA	NOTA	1,225	0.46	
Margin of victory		27,561	10.46	
Turnout		263,456	93.87	
Rejected ballots				
Registered electors				
AITC win (new seat)				
