= Mohibur Rohman =

Indian politician (born 1981)

Mohibur Rohman, also known as Bappy, (born 1981) is an Indian politician from the northeastern state of Assam. He was a member of the Assam Legislative Assembly from Mankachar Assembly constituency in South Salmara-Mankachar district representing the Indian National Congress.

Rohman is from Mankachar, South Salmara-Mankachar district, Assam. He is the son of Dr. Motiur Rohman Mondal, former MLA from this constituency. He did his B.Sc. (engineering) in Computer Science at Regional Institute of Technology, Jamshedpur, Jharkhand, in 2003. He runs his own business and declared assets worth Rs.63 laksh in his affidavit to the Election Commission of India.

== Career ==
Rohman won the Mankachar Assembly constituency representing the Indian National Congress in the 2026 Assam Legislative Assembly election. He polled 1,69,036 votes and defeated his nearest rival, Zabed Islam of the Asom Gana Parishad, by a margin of 53,146 votes.
