= Dhubri Lok Sabha constituency =

Lok Sabha constituency in Assam

Coordinates: 26.0°N 90.0°E

Dhubri AS-2
- Lok Sabha constituency
- Interactive Map Outlining Dhubri Lok Sabha constituency

Constituency details
- Country: India
- Region: Northeast India
- State: Assam
- Assembly constituencies: Mankachar; Birsing Jarua; Dhubri; Gauripur; Golakganj; Bilasipara; Srijangram; Goalpara East; Jaleswar; Mandia; Chenga
- Established: 1967
- Total electors: 26,60,827
- Reservation: None

Member of Parliament
- 18th Lok Sabha
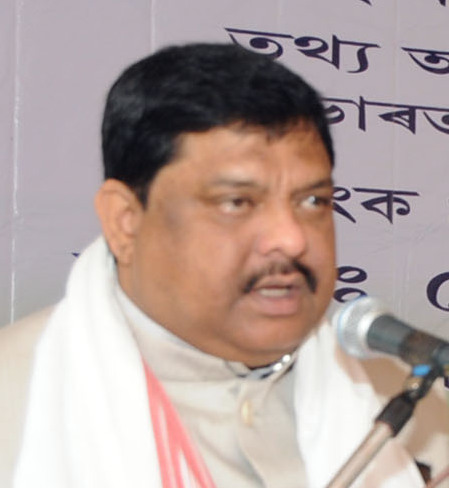
- Incumbent Rakibul Hussain
- Party: INC
- Alliance: INDIA
- Elected year: 2024

Dhubri Lok Sabha constituency is one of the 14 Lok Sabha constituencies in Assam state in north-eastern India. Dhubri consists of 11 assembly segments of Lower Assam, covering all of South Salmara-Mankachar District and Dhubri districts parts of Goalpara district parts of Bongaigaon district and parts of Barpeta district. With an estimated population of 5 million residents Dhubri Lok Sabha constituency has 2.6 million registered voters. Dhubri Lok Sabha constituency is the most populated constituency in the entire North-East region of India.

== Assembly segments ==
Dhubri Lok Sabha constituency is composed of the following assembly segments:

No.	Name	District	Member	Party	2024 Lead
6	Golakganj	Dhubri	Ashwini Roy Sarkar	BJP	AGP
7	Gauripur	Dhubri	Abdus Sobahan Ali Sarkar	INC	INC
8	Dhubri	Dhubri	Baby Begum	INC	INC
9	Birsing Jarua	Dhubri	Wazed Ali Choudhury	INC	INC
10	Bilasipara	Dhubri	Jibesh Rai	AGP	INC
11	Mankachar	South Salmara Mankachar	Mohibur Rohman	INC	INC
12	Jaleshwar	Goalpara	Aftabuddin	INC	INC
14	Goalpara East	Goalpara	Abdul Kalam Rashid Alum	INC	INC
17	Srijangram	Bongaigaon	Nurul Islam	INC	INC
22	Mandia	Barpeta	Sherman Ali Ahmed	AITC	INC
23	Chenga	Barpeta	Abdur Rahim Ahmed	INC	INC

== Members of Parliament ==
Year	Member	Political Party
1952	Amjad Ali	Praja Socialist Party
1957	Amjad Ali	Praja Socialist Party
1962	Ghyasuddin Ahmad	Indian National Congress
1967	Jahan Uddin Ahmed	Praja Socialist Party
1971	Sanjay Ghandhi	Indian National Congress
1977	Ahmed Hussain	Indian National Congress
1980	Nurul Islam	Indian National Congress
1984	Abdul Hamid	Indian National Congress
1991	Nurul Islam	Indian National Congress
1996	Nurul Islam	Indian National Congress
1998	Abdul Hamid	Indian National Congress
1999	Abdul Hamid	Indian National Congress
2004	Anwar Hussain	Indian National Congress
2009	Badruddin Ajmal	All India United Democratic Front
2014	Badruddin Ajmal	All India United Democratic Front
2019	Badruddin Ajmal	All India United Democratic Front
2024	Rakibul Hussain	Indian National Congress

== Election results ==
=== General elections 2024 ===
2024 Indian general election: Dhubri
Party	Candidate	Votes	%	±%
INC	Rakibul Hussain	1,471,885	59.99	▲30.76
AIUDF	Badruddin Ajmal	459,409	18.72	▼23.94
AGP	Zabed Islam	438,594	17.88	New
NOTA	None of the above	15,015	0.61	▲0.08
Majority		1,012,476	41.26	▲27.83
Turnout		2,458,780	92.30	▲1.64
INC gain from AIUDF		Swing		

=== General elections 2019 ===
2019 Indian general elections: Dhubri
Party	Candidate	Votes	%	±%
AIUDF	Badruddin Ajmal	718,764	42.66	−0.6
INC	Abu Taher Bepari	492,506	29.23	+2.74
AGP	Zabed Islam	399,733	23.72	+23.72
AITC	Nurul Islam Choudhury	12,895	0.77	+0.2
Majority		226,258	13.43	
Turnout		1,685,058	90.66	+2.36
AIUDF hold		Swing		

=== General elections 2014 ===
2014 Indian general elections: Dhubri
Party	Candidate	Votes	%	±%
AIUDF	Badruddin Ajmal	592,569	43.26	−8.40
INC	Wazed Ali Choudhury	362,839	26.49	−7.55
BJP	Dr. Debamoy Sanyal	298,985	21.83	+21.83
NOTA	None of the above	5,811	0.42	−−−
Majority		229,730	16.77	17.27
Turnout		1,369,722	88.36	
AIUDF hold		Swing	-8.39	

=== 1999 ===
1999 Indian general election: Dhubri
Party	Candidate	Votes	%	±%
INC	Abdul Hamid	279,812	34.58	
BJP	Dr. Pannalal Oswal	258,472	31.95	
IND	Afzalur Rahman	174,879	21.61	
CPI	Alauddin Sarkar	57,735	7.14	
NCP	Ahmed Hussain	16,611	2.05	
IND	Minhar Ali Mandal	11,892	1.47	
IND	Prabir Kumar Rava	5,785	0.72	
AJBP	Safior Rahman Talukdar	3,883	0.48	
Majority		21,340	2.63	
Turnout		825,531	78.58	
INC hold		Swing		

=== 1998 ===
1998 Indian general election: Dhubri
Party	Candidate	Votes	%	±%
INC	Abdul Hamid	374,625	50.04	
BJP	Dr. Pannalal Oswal	180,987	24.18	
CPI	Giasuddin Ahmed	79,279	10.59	
SP	Mahmood Madani	64,805	8.66	
IND	Dewan Joynal Abedin	44,167	5.90	
IND	Safiul Islam	3,411	0.46	
IND	Phani Medhi	1,368	0.18	
Majority		193,638	25.86	
Turnout		773,082	73.65	
INC hold		Swing		

=== 1996 ===
1996 Indian general election: Dhubri
Party	Candidate	Votes	%	±%
INC	Nurul Islam	314,594	40.10	
AGP	Onkarmal Agarwal	182,373	23.24	
BJP	Panna Lal Oswal	170,985	21.79	
IND	Minhar Ali Mandal	55,822	7.11	
AIIC(T)	Kazi Abul Hussain	42,915	5.47	
SP	Nazrul Islam	17,920	2.28	
Majority		132,221	16.86	
Turnout		810,647	87.08	
INC hold		Swing		

=== 1991 ===
1991 Indian general election: Dhubri
Party	Candidate	Votes	%	±%
INC	Nurul Islam	189,843	26.53	
BJP	Dinesh Chandra Sarkar	140,391	19.62	
JD	Azad Ali	83,478	11.67	
INS(SCS)	Ahmed Hussain	62,597	8.75	
CPI	Tattwa Narayan Adhikary	58,832	8.22	
IND	Minhar Ali Mandal	55,105	7.70	
AGP	Debendra Das	52,879	7.39	
UMFA	Abdul Hamid	33,212	4.64	
NAGP	Mahammad Ali	17,115	2.39	
URM (Note: United Reservation Movement Council of Assam)	Abdul Rezak	9,469	1.32	
IND	Akhirul Islam	6,504	0.91	
JP	Nazrul Islam	6,068	0.85	
Majority		49,452	6.91	
Turnout		749,078	84.79	
INC hold		Swing		

=== 1985 ===
1985 Indian general election: Dhubri
Party	Candidate	Votes	%	±%
IND	Abdul Hamid	159,945	25.91	
INC	Nurul Islam	148,127	23.99	
IND	Debendra Kumar Das	144,571	23.42	
IC(S)	Ahmed Hussain	99,133	16.06	
IND	Prabodh Chandra Pathak	42,603	6.90	
JP	Nazrul Islam Khan	13,131	2.13	
IND	Ananda Chandra Bhowmick	9,839	1.59	
Majority		11,818	1.92	
Turnout		642,847	86.77	
Independent gain from INC		Swing		

=== 1977 ===
1977 Indian general election: Dhubri
Party	Candidate	Votes	%	±%
INC	Ahmmad Hossen	151,328	45.68	
JP	Zahirul Islam	150,738	45.50	
IND	Giasuddin Ahmed	29,201	8.81	
Majority		590	0.18	
Turnout		340,929	67.71	
INC hold		Swing		

=== 1971 ===
1971 Indian general election: Dhubri
Party	Candidate	Votes	%	±%
INC	Moinul Haque Chowdhury	180,226	69.11	
PSP	Jahan Uddin Ahmed	30,478	11.69	
RSP	Taracharan Mazumder	28,362	10.88	
IND	Janathon Sangma	7,075	2.71	
SUCI(C)	Dewan Joynal Abedin	6,876	2.64	
INC(O)	Nazrul Islam	5,185	1.99	
IND	Bimal Prasad Harlalka	2,561	0.98	
Majority		149,748	57.42	
Turnout		274,329	63.16	
INC gain from PSP		Swing		

== See also ==
- Dhubri district
- South Salmara-Mankachar district
- Goalpara district
- Barpeta district
- Bongaigaon district
- List of constituencies of the Lok Sabha
