= Dalgaon Assembly constituency =

Constituency of the Assam legislative assembly in India

Dalgaon
- Constituency No. 51 for the Assam Legislative Assembly

Constituency details
- Country: India
- Region: Northeast India
- State: Assam
- District: Darrang
- Lok Sabha constituency: Darrang–Udalguri
- Established: 1957
- Reservation: None

Member of Legislative Assembly
- 16th Assam Legislative Assembly
- Incumbent Mazibur Rahman
- Party: All India United Democratic Front
- Elected year: 2026

Dalgaon Assembly constituency is one of 126 assembly constituencies of the Assam Legislative Assembly. Dalgaon is part of the Darrang–Udalguri Lok Sabha constituency.

== Details ==
- Country: India.
- State: Assam.
- District: Darrang district.
- Lok Sabha Constituency: Darrang–Udalguri Lok Sabha constituency.
- Area Includes: Bechimari Dev. Block, Dalgaon- Sialmari Dev. Block, Kalaigaon Dev. Block.(Part), Pachim Mangaldai Dev. Block (Part), Pub Mangaldai Dev. Block (Part).

== Members of Legislative Assembly ==
Election	Member	Party affiliation
1957	Md. Matlebuddin	Independent
1962	Md. Matlebuddin	Indian National Congress
1967	Surendra Chandra Barua	Indian National Congress
1972	Hashimuddin Ahmed	Indian National Congress
1978	Syeda Anwara Taimur	Indian National Congress
1983	Syeda Anwara Taimur	Indian National Congress
1985	Abdul Jabbar	Independent
1991	Syeda Anwara Taimur	Indian National Congress
1996	Abdul Jabbar	Asom Gana Parishad
2001	Abdul Jabbar	Asom Gana Parishad
2006	Ilias Ali	Independent
2011	Ilias Ali	Indian National Congress
2016	Ilias Ali	Indian National Congress
2021	Mazibur Rahman	All India United Democratic Front
2026	Mazibur Rahman	All India United Democratic Front

== Election results ==
=== 2026 ===
2026 Assam Legislative Assembly election: Dalgaon
Party	Candidate	Votes	%	±%
AIUDF	Mazibur Rahman	147,555	49.03	−6.61
Independent	Md Aynul Hoque	118,675	39.44	New
RD	Ajijur Rahman	17,613	5.79	New
BJP	Krishna Saha	17,079	5.61	New
NOTA	NOTA	3,327	1.09	+0.30
Margin of victory		28,880	9.59	−16.45
Turnout		304,249	95.83	+0.93
Rejected ballots				
Registered electors				
AIUDF hold		Swing		

=== 2021 ===
2026 Assam Legislative Assembly election: Dalgaon
Party	Candidate	Votes	%	±%
AIUDF	Mazibur Rahman	118,342	55.64	+14.45
INC	Ilias Ali	62,959	29.60	−12.88
AGP	Habibur Rahman	28,344	13.33	−0.37
NOTA	NOTA	1,689	0.79	+0.15
Margin of victory		55,383	26.04	+24.75
Turnout		212,683	94.90	+3.37
Rejected ballots				
Registered electors		224,103		+13.76
AIUDF gain from INC		Swing	+13.16	

=== 2016 ===
2016 Assam Legislative Assembly election: Dalgaon
Party	Candidate	Votes	%	±%
INC	Ilias Ali	76,607	42.48	
AIUDF	Mazibur Rahman	74,287	41.19	
AGP	Habibar Rahman	24,714	13.70	
Independent	Sarifuddin Ahmed	1,016	0.56	
Independent	Abdur Rahim	926	0.51	
Independent	Mustafa Farook Ahmed	900	0.49	
LJP	Ahmed Ali	707	0.39	
NOTA	None of the above	1,165	0.64	
Majority		2,320	1.29	
Turnout		1,80,322	91.53	
Registered electors		1,96,994		
INC hold		Swing		

== See also ==
- Darrang district
- Dalgaon
- List of constituencies of Assam Legislative Assembly
