= Joy Prakash Das =

Indian politician (born 1978)

Deputy Leader of The Opposition Assam Legislative Assembly
- Incumbent
- Assumed office 27 May 2026
- Leader: Wazed Ali Choudhury

Member of the Assam Legislative Assembly
- Incumbent
- Assumed office 4 May 2026
- Preceded by: Bharat Narah
- Constituency: Naoboicha

Personal details
- Born: 1 March 1978 (age 48) Lakhimpur,Assam, India
- Party: Indian National Congress
- Children: 1
- Education: PhD Doctor at Assam Agricultural University, Jorhat
- Profession: Politician

Joy Prakash Das (born 1978) is an Indian politician from the northeastern state of Assam. He was a member of the Assam Legislative Assembly from Naoboicha Assembly constituency, which is reserved for Scheduled Caste community in Lakhimpur district representing the Indian National Congress. He is currently serving as the deputy leader of opposition in Assam Legislative Assembly.

== Early life and education ==
Das is from Nowboicha, Lakhimpur district, Assam. He is the son of Krishna Das. He completed his PhD at Assam Agricultural University, Jorhat in 2011. He runs his own business and declared assets worth Rs.3 crore in his affidavit to the Election Commission of India.

== Career ==
Das won the Naoboicha Assembly constituency representing the Indian National Congress in the 2026 Assam Legislative Assembly election. He polled 86,981 votes and defeated his nearest rival, Basanta Das, of the Asom Gana Parishad, by a margin of votes. Out of the 19 Congress MLAs election in 2026, he is the only Hindu candidate and all others are from the Muslim community.
