= Zabed Islam =

Indian politician

Member of Assam Legislative Assembly
- In office 2011–2016
- Preceded by: Motiur Rohman Mondal
- Succeeded by: Motiur Rohman Mondal
- Constituency: Mankachar

Personal details
- Born: Zabed Islam; 16 May 1968 (age 58) Mankachar, Assam
- Party: Asom Gana Parishad
- Spouse: Hashina Islam (m. 1995)
- Children: Two Sons and One Daughter
- Parents: Zahirul Islam (father); Hosenara Islam (mother)
- Education: Mankachar College(BA)

Zabed Islam (Bengali: জ়াবেদ ইসলাম) is an Indian politician and a former member of legislative assembly. He was elected to the Assam Legislative Assembly from Mankachar in the 2011 Assam Legislative Assembly election as an independent member.

He was nominated from Dhubri as Asom Gana Parishad candidate in the 2019 Indian general election.
