= Mazibur Rahman =

Indian politician

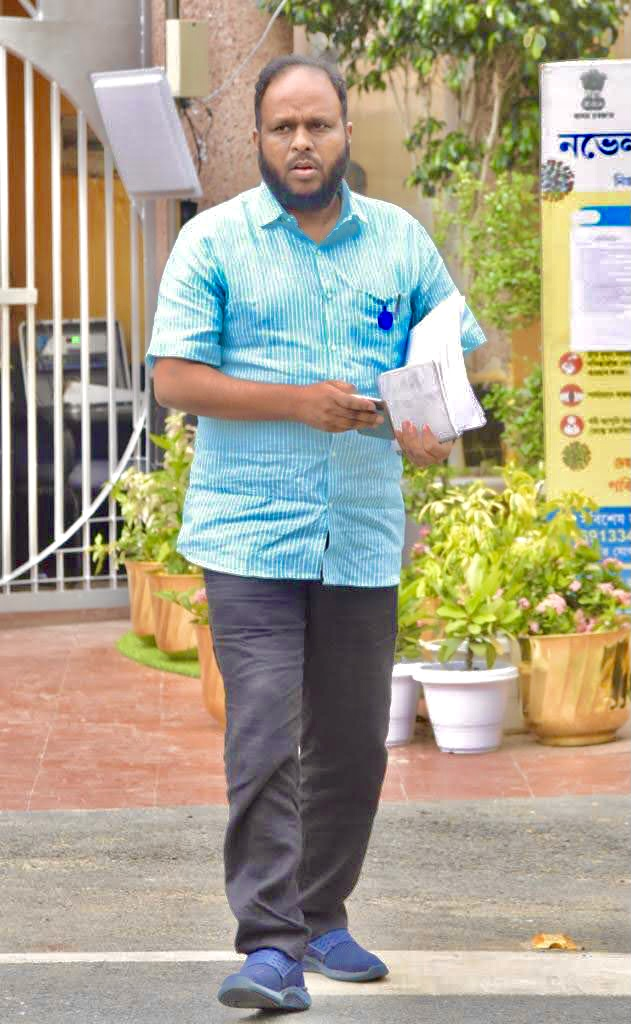

Mazibur Rahman is an Indian politician and a Member of Legislative Assembly, representing the constituency of Dalgaon, Assam in the 15th Assam Assembly.

He graduated with an LL.B. in 2001 from Gauhati University.

From the Dalgaon constituency, Mazibur Rahman ran for the Assam Assembly three times between 2006 and 2016, however he was defeated by Congress politician Ilias Ali each time. In 2006, he garnered 36186 votes, while in 2011 and 2016, he got 58616 and 74287, respectively. He contested election in the Assam Assembly in 2021 for the fourth time on an All India United Democratic Front (AIUDF) ticket from the Dalgaon Constituency. He received 55.2% of the vote overall. This time, he defeated Congress politician Ilias Ali by a margin of 55383 votes.
