= Aminul Islam (Indian politician, born 1975) =

Indian politician

Member of the Assam Legislative Assembly
- In office 21 May 2021 – 17 March 2026
- Preceded by: Dr.Motiur Rohman Mondal
- Succeeded by: TBD
- Constituency: Mankachar

General Secretary (Organization) of All India United Democratic Front
- In office 2 October 2005 – 5 June 2024
- Preceded by: Post Established

Chief Spokesperson of AIUDF Central Committee
- In office 2 October 2005 – 5 June 2024
- Preceded by: Post Established

Personal details
- Born: Md Aminul Islam; 4 September 1975 (age 51) Chirakhowa Kutirghat, Hatsingimari, Assam, India
- Party: Indian National Congress
- Spouse: Adv. Merina Khan
- Children: Niaz Tanweer Islam (son); Tanisha Islam (daughter)
- Parent(s): Jamal Uddin; Nur Jahan Begum
- Education: Bholanath College(BA); Gauhati University(MA)(LLB)
- Profession: Politician; Advocate; Social Worker

Md Aminul Islam (born 4 September 1975) is an Indian politician and advocate. He was General Secretary (Organization) & Chief Spokesperson of All India United Democratic Front since 2005 and was the member of the Assam Legislative Assembly representing Mankachar constituency since 2021 as a member of the All India United Democratic Front. As of early 2026, he has resigned from All India United Democratic Front and joined Indian National Congress
