= Abdur Rahim Ahmed =

Indian politician

Abdur Rahim Ahmed is an Indian politician from the northeastern state of Assam. He was elected to the Assam Legislative Assembly from Barpeta in the 2021 Assam Legislative Assembly election as a member of the Indian National Congress. He was the former President of AAMSU.
