= Dalgaon =

Dalgaon Dolgaon
- town
- Location in Assam, India Dalgaon (India)
- Coordinates: 26°34′0″N 92°12′0″E
- Country: India
- State: Assam
- District: Darrang
- Elevation: 48 m (157 ft)
  - Density: 65/km^{2} (170/sq mi)

Languages
  - Official: Assamese
- Time zone: UTC+5:30 (IST)
- PIN: 784116
- Vehicle registration: AS-13
- Coastline: 0 kilometres (0 mi)
- Nearest city: Mangaldoi
- Sex ratio: 1000/986 ♂/♀
- Literacy: 93.82%
- Lok Sabha constituency: Mangaldoi (Lok Sabha constituency)
- Climate: Cool (Köppen)
- Avg. summer temperature: 34 °C (93 °F)
- Avg. winter temperature: 09 °C (48 °F)

Dalgaon is a town in the Darrang district of Assam, India.

== Geography ==
It is located at an elevation of 48 m above MSL.

== Location ==
National Highway 15 passes through Dalgaon.

== Politics ==
Dalgaon is part of Mangaldoi (Lok Sabha constituency).
