= Bolin Chetia =

Indian politician

Bolin Chetia is an Indian politician of Bharatiya Janata Party (BJP) from Assam who has been serving as the member of the Assam Legislative Assembly representing Sadiya constituency since 2016 as a member of the BJP and from 2006 to 2016 as a member of the Indian National Congress. He hails from Barekuri, Tinsukia.
