= Wazed Ali Choudhury =

Indian politician

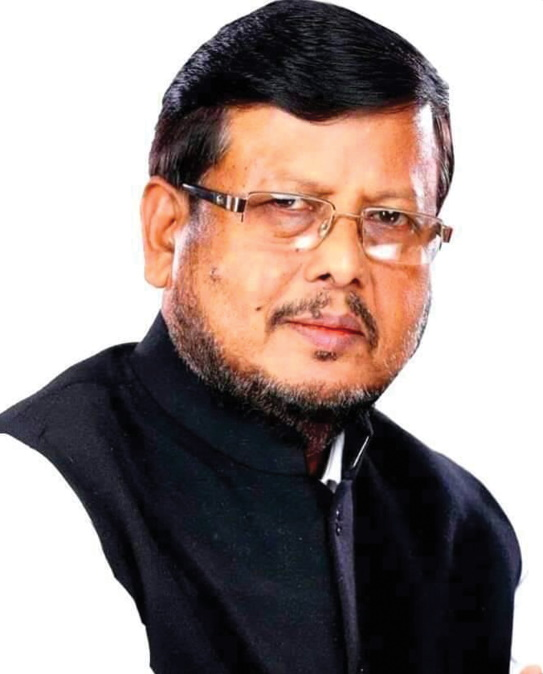
- Official portrait

Leader of the Opposition Assam Legislative Assembly
- Incumbent
- Assumed office 27 May 2026
- Preceded by: Debabrata Saikia

Member of Assam Legislative Assembly
- Incumbent
- Assumed office 4 May 2026
- Preceded by: Constituency Established
- Constituency: Birsing-Jarua
- In office 19 May 2016 – 4 May 2026
- Preceded by: Abdur Rahman Ajmal
- Constituency: Salmara South
- In office 2009 – 13 May 2011
- Preceded by: Badruddin Ajmal
- Succeeded by: Abdur Rahman Ajmal
- In office 9 May 1996 – 11 May 2006
- Preceded by: Dewan Joynal Abedin
- Succeeded by: Badruddin Ajmal

Minister of State (Independent Charge), Government of Assam
- In office 7 June 2002 – 21 May 2006
- Chief Minister: Tarun Gogoi
- Portfolios: Minorities; Char Area Development

Personal details
- Born: 1 July 1959 (age 66) Birshing Part-II, South Salmara
- Party: Indian National Congress
- Occupation: Businessman
- Profession: Politician

Wazed Ali Choudhury (born 1 July 1959) is an Indian politician and businessman. He served as the member of the Assam Legislative Assembly representing Salmara South constituency since 2016, and from 1996 to 2006, as a member of the Indian National Congress and as the Minister of State (Independent Charge), Government of Assam in the First Tarun Gogoi ministry from 2002 to 2006.
