= Mankachar Assembly constituency =

Assembly constituency of Assam

Coordinates: 25.86°N 89.99°E

Mankachar
- Constituency No. 11 for the Assam Legislative Assembly

Constituency details
- Country: India
- Region: Northeast India
- State: Assam
- District: South Salmara Mankachar
- Lok Sabha constituency: Dhubri
- Established: 1978
- Reservation: None

Member of Legislative Assembly
- 16th Assam Legislative Assembly
- Incumbent Mohibur Rohman
- Party: INC
- Alliance: Asom Sonmilito Morcha
- Elected year: 2026
- Preceded by: Abdur Rehman Ajmal

Mankachar Assembly constituency is one of the 126 assembly constituencies of Assam, a north-east state of India. It is also part of the Dhubri Lok Sabha constituency. This constituency was renamed from Salmara South in 2023.

== Members of Legislative Assembly ==
Year	Member	Party
1978	Dewan Joynal Abedin	Independent politician
1983	Mohammad Bazlul Basit	Indian National Congress
1985	Dewan Joynal Abedin	Independent politician
1991	Dewan Joynal Abedin	Independent politician
1996	Wazed Ali Choudhury	Indian National Congress
2001	Wazed Ali Choudhury	Indian National Congress
2006	Badruddin Ajmal	Assam United Democratic Front
2009 (Note: by-election)	Wazed Ali Choudhury	Indian National Congress
2011	Abdur Rehman Ajmal	All India United Democratic Front
2016	Wazed Ali Choudhury	Indian National Congress
2021	Wazed Ali Choudhury	Indian National Congress
2026	Mohibur Rohman	Indian National Congress

== Election results ==
=== 2026 ===
2026 Assam Legislative Assembly election: Mankachar
Party	Candidate	Votes	%	±%
INC	Mohibur Rohman	126,787	59.23	−24.75
AGP	Zabed Islam	75,617	35.32	N/A
AIUDF	Abdul Salam Shah	8,959	4.19	N/A
SUCI(C)	Shahidur Alam	979	0.46	N/A
Majority		51,170	23.91	−83,404
Turnout		212,342		+38,197
INC hold		Swing	{{{swing}}}	

=== 2021 ===
2021 Assam Legislative Assembly election: Salmara South
Party	Candidate	Votes	%	±%
INC	Wazed Ali Choudhury	146,248	83.98	+29.55
Independent	Nurul Islam Mollah	10,674	6.13	
BJP	Asadul Islam	8,919	5.12	+3.80
Independent	Fozlul Hoque Choudhury	1,807	1.04	
NOTA	None of the above	937	0.54	+0.15
Majority		135,574	77.85	+66.48
Turnout		174,145	92.01	−1.66
INC hold		Swing		

=== 2016 ===
2016 Assam Legislative Assembly election: Salmara South
Party	Candidate	Votes	%	±%
INC	Wazed Ali Choudhury	80,066	54.43	+6.93
AIUDF	Badruddin Ajmal	63,343	43.06	−7.49
BJP	Shiraj Hussain	1,954	1.32	N/A
SUCI(C)	Dewan Joynal Abedin	1,153	0.78	−0.52
NOTA	None of the above	581	0.39	N/A
Majority		16,723	11.37	+8.32
Turnout		1,47,097	93.67	+6.11
Registered electors		1,57,525		
INC gain from AIUDF		Swing	+7.21	

=== 2011 ===
2011 Assam Legislative Assembly election: Salmara South
Party	Candidate	Votes	%	±%
AIUDF	Abdur Rahman Ajmal	62,254	50.55	
INC	Wazed Ali Choudhury	58,498	47.50	
SUCI(C)	Dewan Joynal Abedin	1,600	1.30	
AITC	Masidul Haque	794	0.64	
Majority		3,756	3.05	
Turnout		1,23,146	87.56	
Registered electors		1,40,642		
AIUDF hold		Swing		

== See also ==
- South Salmara
- Dhubri district
- South Salmara-Mankachar District
- List of constituencies of Assam Legislative Assembly
