= Assam Legislative Assembly =

Legislature of the Indian state of Assam

- 16th Assam Assembly

Type
- Type: Unicameral of the Assam Legislature
- Term limits: 5 years

History
- Founded: 27 March 1952 (74 years ago)

Leadership
- Governor: Lakshman Prasad Acharya since 30 July 2024
- Speaker: Ranjeet Kumar Dass, BJP since 21 May 2026
- Deputy Speaker: Dr. Habbey Teron, BJP since 21 June 2026
- Leader of the House (Chief Minister): Dr. Himanta Biswa Sarma, BJP since 10 May 2021
- Leader of the Opposition: Wazed Ali Choudhury, INC since 27 May 2026
- Deputy Leader of the Opposition: Joy Prakash Das, INC since 27 May 2026

Structure
- Seats: 126
- Political groups: Government (102) NDA(102): BJP (82); AGP (10); BPF (10); Opposition (24): INC (19); AIUDF (2); RD (2); MAITC (1)

Elections
- Voting system: First past the post
- First election: 1952
- Last election: 9 April 2026
- Next election: 2031

Meeting place
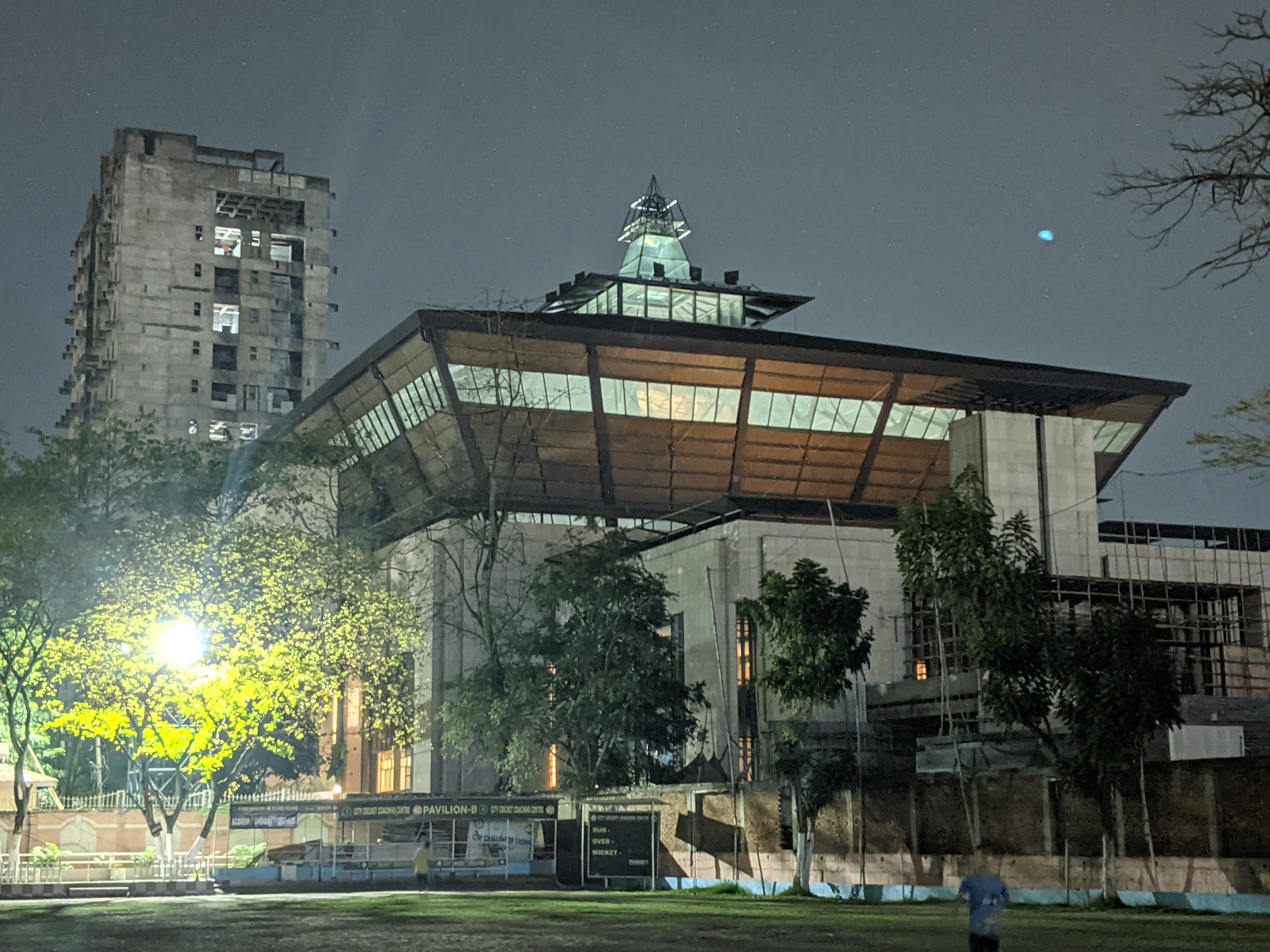
- Assam Legislative Assembly complex, Dispur, Guwahati, Assam, India - 781006.

Website
- www.assambidhansabha.org

The Assam Legislative Assembly is the unicameral legislature of the Indian state of Assam. The Legislative Assembly comprises 126 Members of Legislative Assembly, directly elected from single-seat constituencies. Its term is five years, unless sooner dissolved.

Members of the Assembly are directly elected by the people of Assam through elections held every five years, unless the Assembly is dissolved earlier. The current Assembly was elected in April–May 2026, and the next election is scheduled for 2031. The Assembly plays a key role in law-making for the state, handling crucial matters such as state budgets, development policies, and local governance. It has the authority to legislate on issues specified under the State and Concurrent Lists of the Constitution of India.

The Assembly functions through various committees that handle specific issues, including the budget, public accounts, and legislative procedures. The Chief Minister, who is the leader of the majority party in the Assembly, holds executive powers and is the head of the state government.

== History ==
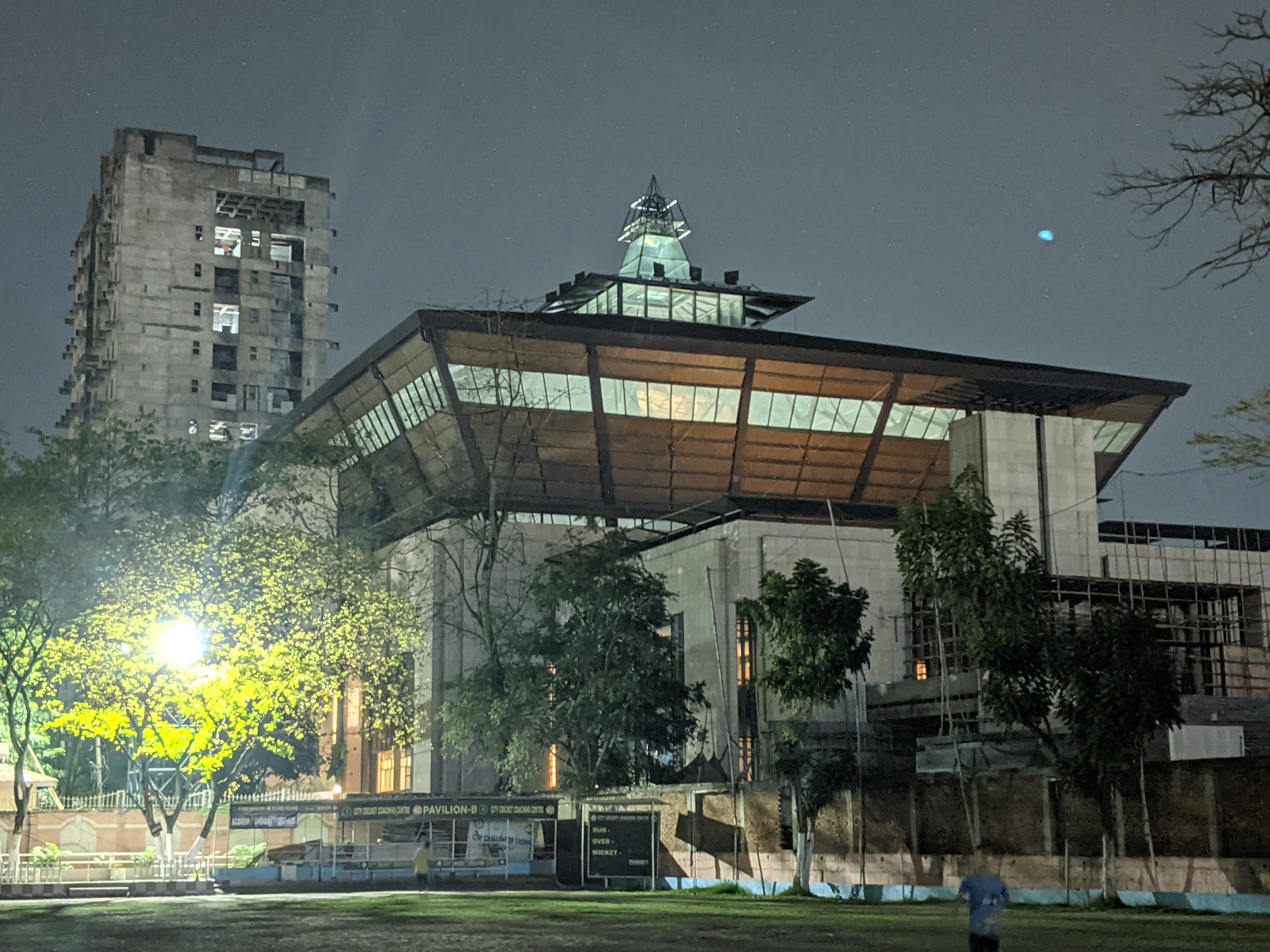
Assam Legislative Assembly

According to provisions of the Government of India Act 1935, a bicameral legislature of Assam province came into existence in 1937. After the Government of India Act 1935 was passed, it paved the way for the formation of Assam Legislative Assembly, and became a bicameral legislature. The strength of the House was 108, where all the members were elected. The Legislative Council (Upper House) was not less than 21 and not more than 22 members.

The first sitting of its lower house, the Assam Legislative Assembly, took place on 7 April 1937 in the Assembly Chamber at Shillong. Shillong was the capital of the composite State of Assam. It had a strength of 108 members. However, the strength of the Assembly was reduced to 71 after the partition of India.

After Indian independence, the Assam Legislative Council was abolished in 1952 and the Assam Legislative Assembly became unicameral. The reconstituted assembly had 108 members with 31 seats reserved for Scheduled Tribes and Scheduled Castes.

In the years that followed, Assam was truncated to several smaller states. And over the years, with the changing geographical boundaries and increase in population, the strength of members has changed from 108 in 1952–57 to 114 in 1967-72 (the third Assembly) and by 1972-78 (the fifth Assembly) it had a strength of 126 members.

== List of Assemblies ==
The elections for the Assam Assembly are being held since 1952

Year	Legislative Assembly Election	Party	Chief Minister	Seat split
1950	First Assembly	Indian National Congress	Gopinath Bordoloi	
1952	First Assembly	Indian National Congress	Bishnuram Medhi	
1957	Second Assembly	Indian National Congress	Bishnuram Medhi	
1957	Second Assembly	Indian National Congress	Bimala Prasad Chaliha	
1962	Third Assembly	Indian National Congress	Bimala Prasad Chaliha	
1967	Fourth Assembly	Indian National Congress	Bimala Prasad Chaliha	
1967	Fourth Assembly	Indian National Congress	Mahendra Mohan Choudhry	
1972	Fifth Assembly	Indian National Congress	Sarat Chandra Sinha	
1978	Sixth Assembly	Janata Party	Golap Borbora	
1978	Sixth Assembly	Janata Party	Jogendra Nath Hazarika	
1979	Sixth Assembly	President's Rule	N/A	N/A
1980	Sixth Assembly	Indian National Congress	Anwara Taimur	
1981	Sixth Assembly	President's Rule	N/A	N/A
1982	Sixth Assembly	Indian National Congress	Keshab Chandra Gogoi	
1982	Assembly Dissolved	President's Rule	N/A	N/A
1983	Seventh Assembly	Indian National Congress	Hiteswar Saikia	
1985	Eight Assembly	Asom Gana Parishad	Prafulla Kumar Mahanta	
1991	Ninth Assembly	Indian National Congress	Hiteswar Saikia	
1991	Ninth Assembly	Indian National Congress	Bhumidhar Barman	
1996	Tenth Assembly	Asom Gana Parishad	Prafulla Kumar Mahanta	
2001	Eleventh Assembly	Indian National Congress	Tarun Gogoi	Total: 126. INC: 71, AGP: 20, BJP: 8, NCP: 3, ASDC: 2, SP: 1, SP: 1, AITC: 1, IND: 19
2006	Twelfth Assembly	Indian National Congress	Tarun Gogoi	Total: 125. INC: 53, AGP: 24, AIUDF: 10, BJP: 10, CPI(M): 2, CPI: 1, IND: 21
2011	Thirteenth Assembly	Indian National Congress	Tarun Gogoi	Total: 126. INC: 78, AIUDF: 18, BPF: 12, AGP: 10, BJP: 5, AITC: 1, IND: 2
2016	Fourteenth Assembly	Bharatiya Janata Party	Sarbananda Sonowal	Total: 126. BJP: 60, INC: 26, AGP: 14, AIUDF: 13, BPF: 12, IND: 1
2021	Fifteenth Assembly	Bharatiya Janata Party	Himanta Biswa Sarma	Total: 126. BJP: 60, INC: 29, AIUDF: 16, AGP: 9, UPPL: 6,BPF: 4, CPI(M): 1, IND: 1
2026	Sixteenth Assembly	Bharatiya Janata Party	Himanta Biswa Sarma	Total: 126. BJP: 82, INC: 19, AGP: 10, BPF: 10, RD: 2, AIUDF: 2, AITC: 1

== Office bearers ==
S.No	Position	Portrait	Name	Party	Constituency	Office Taken	Reference
1	Speaker		Ranjeet Kumar Dass	BJP	Bhowanipur–Sorbhog	21 May 2026	
2	Deputy Speaker		Habbey Teron	BJP	Amri (ST)	21 June 2026	
3	Leader of the House (Chief Minister)		Himanta Biswa Sarma	BJP	Jalukbari	12 May 2026	
4	Leader of the Opposition		Wazed Ali Choudhury	INC			
5	Deputy Leader of the Opposition		Joy Prakash Das	INC			

== Members of the Legislative Assembly ==
District	No.	Constituency	Name	Party	Alliance	Remarks
Kokrajhar	1	Gossaigaon	Sabharam Basumatary	BPF	NDA	
Kokrajhar	2	Dotma (ST)	Rabiram Narzary	BPF	NDA	
Kokrajhar	3	Kokrajhar (ST)	Sewli Mohilary	BPF	NDA	
Kokrajhar	4	Baokhungri	Rupam Chandra Roy	BPF	NDA	
Kokrajhar	5	Parbatjhora	Md Ashraful Islam Sheikh	INC	ASM	
Dhubri	6	Golakganj	Ashwini Roy Sarkar	BJP	NDA	
Dhubri	7	Gauripur	Abdus Sobahan Ali Sarkar	INC	ASM	
Dhubri	8	Dhubri	Baby Begum	INC	ASM	
Dhubri	9	Birsing Jarua	Wazed Ali Choudhury	INC	ASM	
Dhubri	10	Bilasipara	Jibesh Rai	AGP	NDA	
South Salmara-Mankachar	11	Mankachar	Mohibur Rohman	INC	ASM	
Goalpara	12	Jaleshwar	Aftab Uddin Mollah	INC	ASM	
Goalpara	13	Goalpara West (ST)	Pabitra Rabha	BJP	NDA	
Goalpara	14	Goalpara East	Abul Kalam Rasheed Alam	INC	ASM	
Goalpara	15	Dudhnai (ST)	Tankeswar Rabha	BJP	NDA	
Bongaigaon	16	Abhayapuri	Bhupen Roy	BJP	NDA	
Bongaigaon	17	Srijangram	Md. Nurul Islam	INC	ASM	
Bongaigaon	18	Bongaigaon	Diptimayee Choudhury	AGP	NDA	
Chirang	19	Sidli–Chirang (ST)	Paniram Brahma	BPF	NDA	
Chirang	20	Bijni	Arup Kumar Dey	BJP	NDA	
Bajali	21	Bhowanipur–Sorbhog	Ranjeet Kumar Dass	BJP	NDA	
Barpeta	22	Mandia	Sherman Ali Ahmed	AITC	None	
Barpeta	23	Chenga	Abdur Rahim Ahmed	INC	ASM	
Barpeta	24	Barpeta (SC)	Dipak Kumar Das	AGP	NDA	
Barpeta	25	Pakabetbari	Jakir Hussain Sikdar	INC	ASM	
Bajali	26	Bajali	Dharmeswar Roy	AGP	NDA	
Kamrup	27	Chamaria	Rekibuddin Ahmed	INC	ASM	
Kamrup	28	Boko–Chaygaon (ST)	Raju Mesh	BJP	NDA	
Kamrup	29	Palasbari	Himangshu Shekhar Baishya	BJP	NDA	
Kamrup	30	Hajo–Sualkuchi (SC)	Prakash Chandra Das	AGP	NDA	
Kamrup	31	Rangiya	Bhabesh Kalita	BJP	NDA	
Kamrup	32	Kamalpur	Diganta Kalita	BJP	NDA	
Kamrup Metropolitan	33	Dispur	Pradyut Bordoloi	BJP	NDA	
Kamrup Metropolitan	34	Dimoria (SC)	Tapan Das	AGP	NDA	
Kamrup Metropolitan	35	New Guwahati	Diplu Ranjan Sarmah	BJP	NDA	
Kamrup Metropolitan	36	Guwahati Central	Vijay Kumar Gupta	BJP	NDA	
Kamrup Metropolitan	37	Jalukbari	Himanta Biswa Sarma	BJP	NDA	Chief minister
Nalbari	38	Barkhetri	Narayan Deka	BJP	NDA	
Nalbari	39	Nalbari	Jayanta Malla Baruah	BJP	NDA	
Nalbari	40	Tihu	Chandra Mohan Patowary	BJP	NDA	
Baksa	41	Manas	Thaneswar Basumatary	BPF	NDA	
Baksa	42	Baksa (ST)	Maneswar Brahma	BPF	NDA	
Tamulpur	43	Tamulpur (ST)	Biswajit Daimary	BJP	NDA	
Tamulpur	44	Goreshwar	Victor Kumar Das	BJP	NDA	
Udalguri	45	Bhergaon	Maheswar Baro	BPF	NDA	
Udalguri	46	Udalguri (ST)	Rihon Daimary	BPF	NDA	
Udalguri	47	Majbat	Charan Boro	BPF	NDA	
Udalguri	48	Tangla	Bikan Chandra Deka	BJP	NDA	
Darrang	49	Sipajhar	Paramananda Rajbongshi	BJP	NDA	
Darrang	50	Mangaldai	Nilima Devi	BJP	NDA	
Darrang	51	Dalgaon	Mazibur Rahman	AIUDF	None	
Morigaon	52	Jagiroad (SC)	Pijush Hazarika	BJP	NDA	
Morigaon	53	Laharighat	Asif Mohammad Nazar	INC	ASM	
Morigaon	54	Morigaon	Rama Kantha Dewri	BJP	NDA	
Nagaon	55	Dhing	Mehboob Mukhtar	RD	None	
Nagaon	56	Rupohihat	Nurul Huda	INC	ASM	
Nagaon	57	Kaliabor	Keshab Mahanta	AGP	NDA	
Nagaon	58	Samaguri	Tanzil Hussain	INC	ASM	
Nagaon	59	Barhampur	Jitu Goswami	BJP	NDA	
Nagaon	60	Nagaon–Batadraba	Rupak Sarmah	BJP	NDA	
Nagaon	61	Raha (SC)	Sashi Kanta Das	BJP	NDA	
Hojai	62	Binnakandi	Mohammed Badruddin Ajmal	AIUDF	None	
Hojai	63	Hojai	Shiladitya Dev	BJP	NDA	
Hojai	64	Lumding	Sibu Misra	BJP	NDA	
Sonitpur	65	Dhekiajuli	Ashok Singhal	BJP	NDA	
Sonitpur	66	Barchalla	Ritu Baran Sarmah	BJP	NDA	
Sonitpur	67	Tezpur	Prithiraj Rava	AGP	NDA	
Sonitpur	68	Rangapara	Krishna Kamal Tanti	BJP	NDA	
Sonitpur	69	Nadaur	Padma Hazarika	BJP	NDA	
Biswanath	70	Biswanath	Pallab Lochan Das	BJP	NDA	
Biswanath	71	Behali (SC)	Munindra Das	BJP	NDA	
Biswanath	72	Gohpur	Utpal Borah	BJP	NDA	
Lakhimpur	73	Bihpuria	Bhupen Kumar Borah	BJP	NDA	
Lakhimpur	74	Rongonadi	Rishiraj Hazarika	BJP	NDA	
Lakhimpur	75	Naoboicha (SC)	Joy Prakash Das	INC	ASM	
Lakhimpur	76	Lakhimpur	Manab Deka	BJP	NDA	
Lakhimpur	77	Dhakuakhana (ST)	Naba Kumar Doley	BJP	NDA	
Dhemaji	78	Dhemaji (ST)	Ranoj Pegu	BJP	NDA	
Dhemaji	79	Sissiborgaon	Jiban Gogoi	BJP	NDA	
Dhemaji	80	Jonai (ST)	Bhubon Pegu	BJP	NDA	
Tinsukia	81	Sadiya	Bolin Chetia	BJP	NDA	
Tinsukia	82	Doom Dooma	Rupesh Gowala	BJP	NDA	
Tinsukia	83	Margherita	Bhaskar Sharma	BJP	NDA	
Tinsukia	84	Digboi	Suren Phukan	BJP	NDA	
Tinsukia	85	Makum	Sanjoy Kishan	BJP	NDA	
Tinsukia	86	Tinsukia	Pulok Gohain	BJP	NDA	
Dibrugarh	87	Chabua–Lahowal	Binod Hazarika	BJP	NDA	
Dibrugarh	88	Dibrugarh	Prasanta Phukan	BJP	NDA	
Dibrugarh	89	Khowang	Chakradhar Gogoi	BJP	NDA	
Dibrugarh	90	Duliajan	Rameswar Teli	BJP	NDA	
Dibrugarh	91	Tingkhong	Bimal Borah	BJP	NDA	
Dibrugarh	92	Naharkatia	Taranga Gogoi	BJP	NDA	
Charaideo	93	Sonari	Dhormeswar Konwar	BJP	NDA	
Charaideo	94	Mahmora	Suruj Dehingia	BJP	NDA	
Sibsagar	95	Demow	Susanta Borgohain	BJP	NDA	
Sibsagar	96	Sibsagar	Akhil Gogoi	RD	None	
Sibsagar	97	Nazira	Mayur Borgohain	BJP	NDA	
Majuli	98	Majuli (ST)	Bhuban Gam	BJP	NDA	
Jorhat	99	Teok	Bikash Saikia	AGP	NDA	
Jorhat	100	Jorhat	Hitendra Nath Goswami	BJP	NDA	
Jorhat	101	Mariani	Rupjyoti Kurmi	BJP	NDA	
Jorhat	102	Titabor	Dhiraj Gowala	BJP	NDA	
Golaghat	103	Golaghat	Ajanta Neog	BJP	NDA	
Golaghat	104	Dergaon	Mridul Kumar Dutta	BJP	NDA	
Golaghat	105	Bokakhat	Atul Bora	AGP	NDA	
Golaghat	106	Khumtai	Mrinal Saikia	BJP	NDA	
Golaghat	107	Sarupathar	Biswajit Phukan	BJP	NDA	
Karbi Anglong	108	Bokajan (ST)	Surjya Rongphar	BJP	NDA	
Karbi Anglong	109	Howraghat (ST)	Lunsing Teron	BJP	NDA	
Karbi Anglong	110	Diphu (ST)	Niso Terangpi	BJP	NDA	
West Karbi Anglong	111	Rongkhang (ST)	Tuliram Ronghang	BJP	NDA	
West Karbi Anglong	112	Amri (ST)	Habbey Teron	BJP	NDA	
Dima Hasao	113	Haflong (ST)	Rupali Langthasa	BJP	NDA	
Cachar	114	Lakhipur	Kaushik Rai	BJP	NDA	
Cachar	115	Udharbond	Rajdeep Goala	BJP	NDA	
Cachar	116	Katigorah	Kamalakhya Dey Purkayastha	BJP	NDA	
Cachar	117	Borkhola	Kishor Nath	BJP	NDA	
Cachar	118	Silchar	Dr. Rajdeep Roy	BJP	NDA	
Cachar	119	Sonai	Aminul Haque Laskar	INC	ASM	
Cachar	120	Dholai (SC)	Amiya Kanti Das	BJP	NDA	
Hailakandi	121	Hailakandi	Dr. Milon Das	BJP	NDA	
Hailakandi	122	Algapur–Katlicherra	Zubair Anam Mazumder	INC	ASM	
Sribhumi	123	Karimganj North	Jakaria Ahmed	INC	ASM	
Sribhumi	124	Karimganj South	Aminur Rashid Choudhury	INC	ASM	
Sribhumi	125	Patharkandi	Krishnendu Paul	BJP	NDA	
Sribhumi	126	Ram Krishna Nagar (SC)	Bijoy Malakar	BJP	NDA	

== Leaders of Opposition ==
Official Opposition is a term used to designate the political party which has secured the second largest number of seats in the assembly. In order to get formal recognition, the party must have at least one-sixth of the total number of Members of the House as required under the aforementioned provisions. However, On 16 May 2026, the Assam Legislative Assembly amended its rules to lower the eligibility threshold for the Leader of the Opposition from one-sixth to one-tenth of the total membership. As a result, a party now requires at least 13 MLAs instead of 21 to qualify, enabling the Indian National Congress, despite its reduced strength, to appoint a Leader of the Opposition in the Assembly.

=== Leaders of Opposition ===
#	Assembly	Name	Portrait	Took office	Left office	Constituency	Party	Chief Minister
1	1st Provincial Assembly	Gopinath Bordoloi		1937	1938	Kamrup Sadar South	Indian National Congress	Sir Syed Muhammed Saadulah
2	1st Assam Assembly	Hareswar Goswami		1952	1957	Palasbari	Socialist Party	Bishnuram Medhi
2	2nd Assam Assembly	Hareswar Goswami		1957	1962	Rampur	Praja Socialist Party	Bimala Prasad Chaliha
3	3rd Assam Assembly	Lakshmi Prasad Goswami		1962	1967	Laharighat	Praja Socialist Party	Bimala Prasad Chaliha
4	4th Assam Assembly	?		1967	1972			Mahendra Mohan Choudhry
5	5th Assam Assembly	Gaurishankar Bhattacharyya		1972	1978	Borbhag	Peoples Democratic Party of Assam	Sarat Chandra Sinha
?		?	?	1978	1979	?	Indian National Congress	Golap Borbora
?		?	?	1979	1979	?	Indian National Congress	Jogendra Nath Hazarika
?		?	?	1980	1981	?	Janata Party	Anwara Taimur
?		?	?	1981	1983	?	Janata Party	Keshab Chandra Gogoi
?		?	?	1983	1985	?	?	Hiteswar Saikia
3		Golok Rajbanshi		1985	1990	Rangapara	Indian National Congress	Prafulla Kumar Mahanta
4		Prafulla Kumar Mahanta		1991	1996	Barhampur	Asom Gana Parishad	Hiteswar Saikia
?		?		1996	2001	?	Indian National Congress	Prafulla Kumar Mahanta
4	11th Assam Assembly	Brindaban Goswami	B.Goswami in Left Side	2001	2006	Tezpur	Asom Gana Parishad	Tarun Gogoi
4	12th Assam Assembly	Brindaban Goswami	B.Goswami in Left Side	2006	2006	Tezpur	Asom Gana Parishad	Tarun Gogoi
5	12th Assam Assembly	Chandra Mohan Patowary		2006	2010	Dharmapur	Asom Gana Parishad	Tarun Gogoi
(3)	12th Assam Assembly	Prafulla Kumar Mahanta		2010	2011	Barhampur	Asom Gana Parishad	Tarun Gogoi
	13th Assam Assembly	?	?	2011	2014	Barhampur	Asom Gana Parishad	Tarun Gogoi
6	14th Assam Assembly	Debabrata Saikia		6-June-2016	5-Jan-2021	Nazira	Indian National Congress	Sarbananda Sonowal
6	15th Assam Assembly	Debabrata Saikia		21-May-2021	07-May-2026	Nazira	Indian National Congress	Dr. Himanta Biswa Sarma
	16th Assam Assembly	Wazed Ali Choudhury		27 May 2026	Incumbent	Birsing Jarua	Indian National Congress	Dr. Himanta Biswa Sarma

=== Deputy Leader of Opposition ===
#	Assembly	Name	Portrait	Term	Constituency	Party	Chief Minister
1	1st Assam Assembly	Ajra Singh Khongphai		1952-1957	Nongstoin	Independent	Bishnuram Medhi
2	5th Assam Assembly	Renuka Devi Barkataki		1972-1978	Hajo	Peoples Democratic Party of Assam	Sarat Chandra Sinha
3	14th Assam Assembly	Rakibul Hussain		2016-2021	Samaguri	Indian National Congress	Sarbananda Sonowal
3	15th Assam Assembly	Rakibul Hussain		2021-2024	Samaguri	Indian National Congress	Dr. Himanta Biswa Sarma
4	15th Assam Assembly	Vacant	Vacant	2024-2026	N/A	Indian National Congress	Dr. Himanta Biswa Sarma
5	16th Assam Assembly	Joy Prakash Das		2026-2031	Naoboicha	Indian National Congress	Dr. Himanta Biswa Sarma

== See also ==
- List of constituencies of the Assam Legislative Assembly
- Government of Assam
