= All India United Democratic Front =

Political party in Assam, India

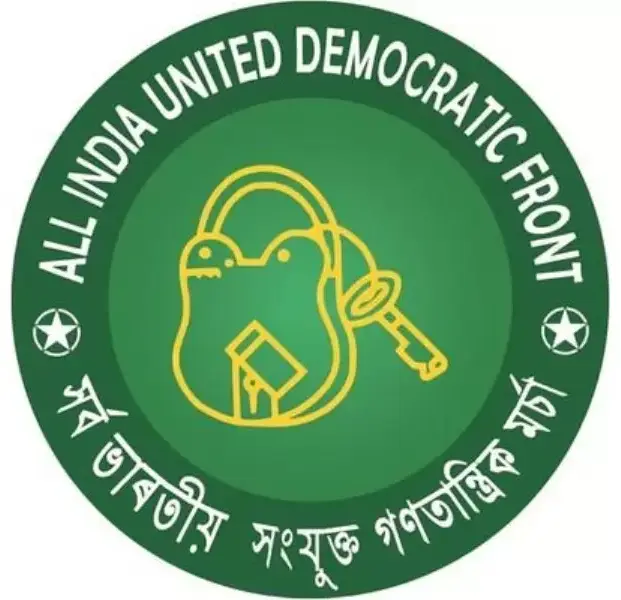
- Abbreviation: AIUDF
- Leader: Badruddin Ajmal
- General Secretary: Adv. Aminul Islam
- Founded: 2 October 2005 (21 years ago)
- Headquarters: No.3 Friends Path, Hatigaon, Guwahati-781038
- Ideology: Agrarianism; National Inclusiveness; Minority rights Deobandi politics Deobandi composite nationalism
- Political position: Centre-right to Right-wing
- ECI status: State Party
- Alliance: UPA (2019–2021)
- Seats in Rajya Sabha: 0 / 245
- Seats in Lok Sabha: 0 / 543
- Seats in Assam Legislative Assembly: 2 / 126

Election symbol

The All India United Democratic Front (also known as AIUDF and Sarva Bharatiya Sanyukt Ganatantric Morcha) is a political party active in the Indian state of Assam. It is the joint fifth-largest political party in the Assam Legislative Assembly, along with RD, after the BJP, INC, AGP and BPF.

The party was founded by Maulana Badruddin Ajmal on 3 October 2005 and at that time, its name was Assam United Democratic Front (AUDF). It was relaunched as a national party under its current name at a press meet in New Delhi on 2 February 2009, again with Badruddin Ajmal as the party's leader. The party is headquartered in Guwahati.

The AIUDF is a key opposition party in Assam, which has the support of millions of Miya Bengali Muslims from Lower Assam and Barak Valley. It won 18 of 126 seats in the 2011 Legislative Assembly election; in 2016, it won 13 of the 126 seats. In the 2021 Assam Assembly Election, Congress and AIUDF formed a grand alliance along with BPF and communist parties. The alliance fought against the BJP-led NDA. AIUDF increased its tally and won 16 of 126 seats in the 2021 Legislative assembly election of Assam. However, its alliance could not win enough seats to form a government. It won just 2 of 126 seats in the 2026 Legislative Assembly election, an all time low for the party.

== Election performance ==
=== Lok Sabha elections ===
Year	Election	Seats won	Change of Seats	Vote%	Change of Vote%
2009	15th Lok Sabha	1 / 14	–	16.3%	
2014	16th Lok Sabha	3 / 14	▲2	14.8%	▼2.5%
2019	17th Lok Sabha	1 / 14	▼2	7.8%	▼7%
2024	18th Lok Sabha	0 / 14	▼1	3.13%	▼4.67%

=== State Assembly elections ===
Year	Election	Seats won	Change of Seats	Vote%	Change of Vote%
Assam Legislative Assembly
2006	12th Assembly	10 / 126	Steady		Steady
2011	13th Assembly	18 / 126	▲8	13%	
2016	14th Assembly	13 / 126	▼5	13%	Steady
2021	15th Assembly	16 / 126	▲3	9.3%	▼4.3%
2026	16th Assembly	2 / 126	▼14	5.4%	▼3.9%

== Leadership ==
All State Presidents, National Spokespersons & Important people of AIUDF.

Portrait	Name	Party Post	Legislature Post	Ref.
Maulana Badruddin Ajmal	Badruddin Ajmal	National President	Ex Member of Parliament; Dhubri	
	Adv. Aminul Islam	General Secretary	Ex MLA; Mankachar	
		National Spokesperson		

== See also ==
- All India Majlis e Ittehadul Muslimeen
- List of political parties in India
