= 2011 Assam Legislative Assembly election =

Indian state election

- 4 and 11 April 2011

All 126 seats in the Assam Legislative Assembly 64 seats needed for a majority
- Turnout: 76.04%
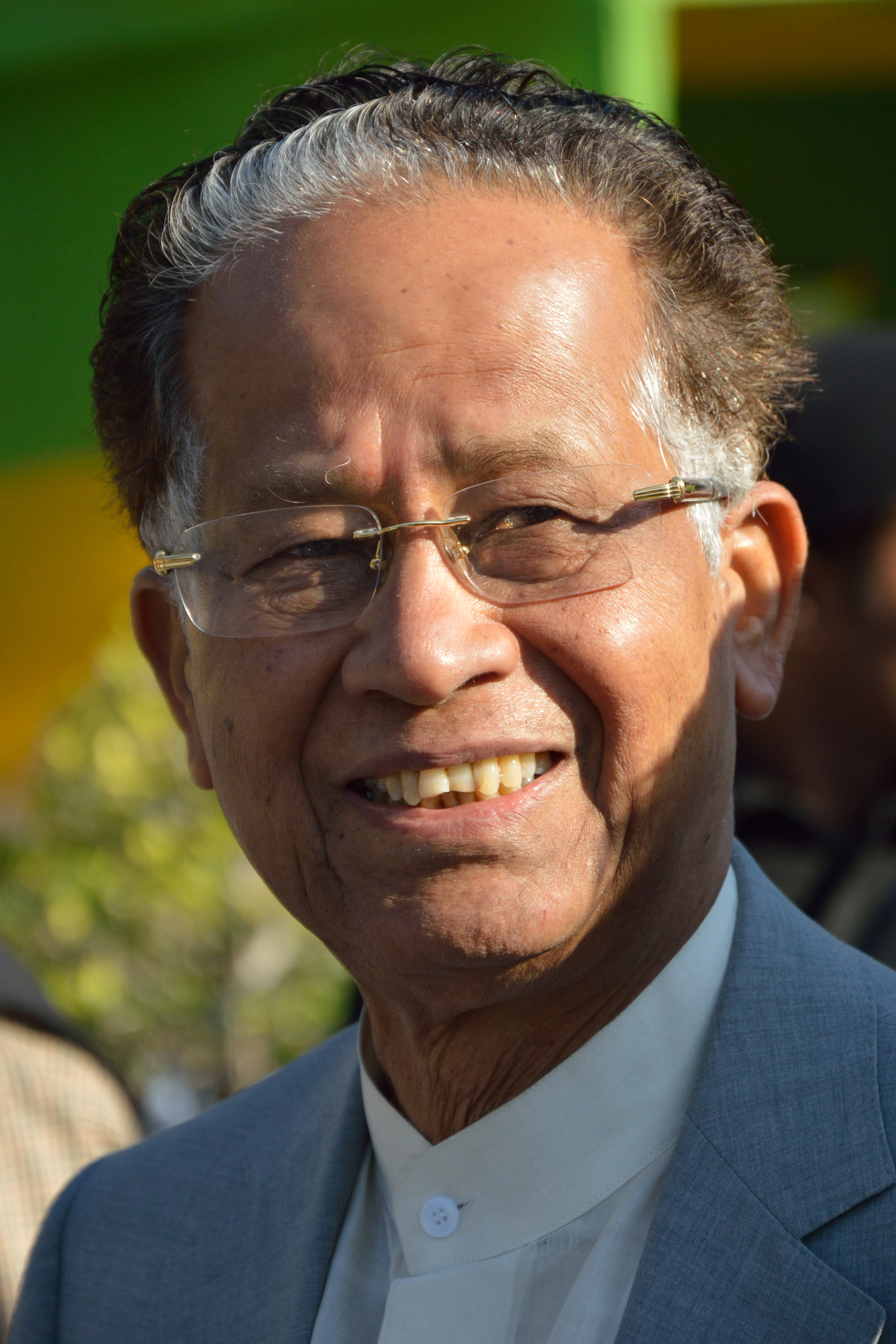

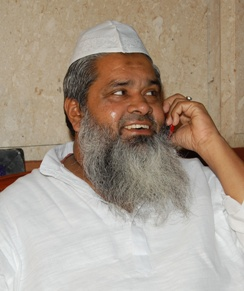

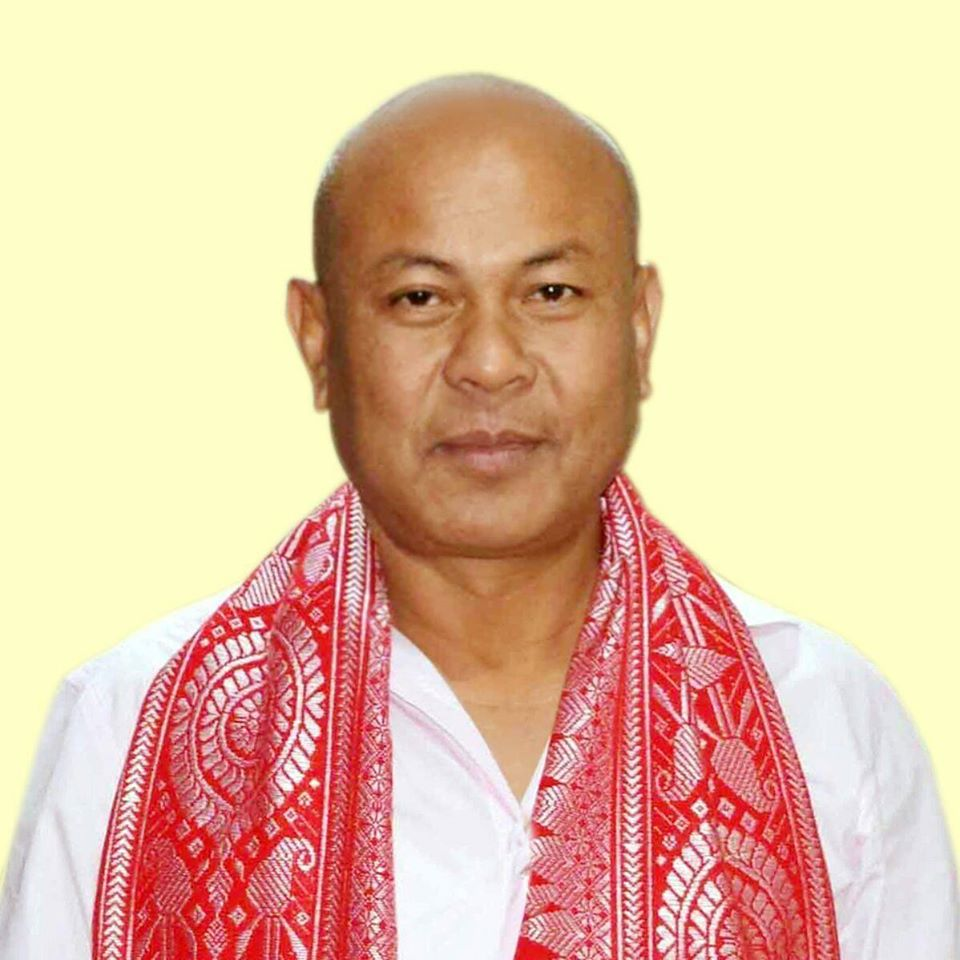

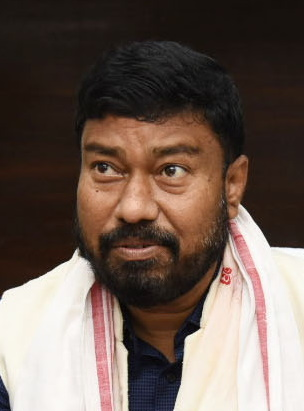

	Majority party	Minority party	Third party
Leader	Tarun Gogoi	Badruddin Ajmal	Hagrama Mohilary
Party	INC	AIUDF	BPF
Leader's seat	Titabar	Did not contest	Did not contest
Last election	53	10	Did not contest
Seats won	78	18	12
Seat change	▲25	▲8	▲12
Percentage	39.39%	12.57%	6.13%
	Fourth party	Fifth party	Sixth party
	AGP
Leader	Chandra Mohan Patowary	Rameswar Teli	Dwipen Pathak
Party	AGP	BJP	AITC
Leader's seat	Dharmapur (lost)	Duliajan (lost)	Hajo
Last election	24	10	0
Seats won	10	5	1
Seat change	▼14	▼5	▲1
Percentage	16.29%	11.47%	2.05%
- Seatwise results of the election

- Structure of the Assam Legislative Assembly after the election
Chief Minister before election
Tarun Gogoi
INC
Elected Chief Minister
Tarun Gogoi
INC

2011 Assam Legislative Assembly election was held in two phases on 4 and 11 April 2011 to elect members from 126 constituencies in Assam, India. The result was announced on 13 May.

== Background ==
After the 2006 elections, the Indian National Congress and Bodoland People's Front formed a coalition government. During this period, the Assam government headed by Tarun Gogoi made significant overtures to bring the United Liberation Front of Assam (ULFA) to the negotiating table. A number of ULFA militants who had surrendered to the government forces contested the elections. The government emphasised also "peace and development" under the last ten years of Congress government. The main opposition party, Asom Gana Parishad, stood for regionalist sentiments. The Bharatiya Janata Party promoted anti-immigrant sentiments in Assam as a communal or sectarian conflict.

== Parties contested ==
Party	Flag	Symbol	Leader	Contesting Seats
Indian National Congress			Tarun Gogoi	126
Bharatiya Janata Party			Rameshwar Teli	120
Asom Gana Parishad			Brindaban Goswami	104
All India Trinamool Congress			Mamata Banerjee	103
All India United Democratic Front			Badruddin Ajmal	78
Bodoland People's Front			Hagrama Mohilary	29

== Results ==
Parties and Coalitions	Popular vote			Seats		
Parties and Coalitions	Vote	%	+/-	Contested	Won	+/-
Indian National Congress	5,443,781	39.39		126	78	▲25
Asom Gana Parishad	2,251,935	16.29		104	10	▼14
All India United Democratic Front	1,737,415	12.57		78	18	▲8
Bharatiya Janata Party	1,584,895	11.47		120	5	▼5
Bodoland People's Front	847,520	6.13		29	12	▲12
All India Trinamool Congress	283,683	2.05		103	1	▲1
Independents	1,267,925	9.17		263	2	▼20

== Results by constituency ==
Results
Assembly Constituency		Winner				Runner Up				Margin
#	Name	Candidate	Party	Votes	%	Candidate	Party	Votes	%	Margin
1	Ratabari	Kripanath Mallah	INC	33043	39.82	Nikhil Suklabaidya	BJP	20614	24.84	12429
2	Patharkandi	Monilal Gowala	INC	44986	42.26	Kartik Sena Singha	AIUDF	41762	39.23	3224
3	Karimganj North	Kamalakhya Dey Purkayastha	INC	45027	41.53	Mission Ranjan Das	BJP	27257	25.14	17770
4	Karimganj South	Siddique Ahmed	INC	45395	43.42	Ekbal Hussain	TMC	22282	21.31	23113
5	Badarpur	Jamal Uddin Ahmed	INC	35869	39.16	Helal Uddin Chowdhury	AIUDF	28487	31.10	7382
6	Hailakandi	Abdul Muhim Mazumdar	INC	33038	37.87	Subrata Kumar Nath	BJP	28040	32.14	4998
7	Katlicherra	Gautam Roy	INC	65391	60.08	Jyotish Chandra Dey	AIUDF	33455	30.73	31936
8	Algapur	Sahidul Alam Chowdhury	AGP	56931	53.77	Rahul Roy	INC	42074	39.62	14857
9	Silchar	Sushmita Dev	INC	60978	50.34	Rajdeep Roy	BJP	45127	37.25	15851
10	Sonai	Anamul Haque	INC	63611	61.75	Audesh Kumar Singh	BJP	21583	20.95	42028
11	Dholai	Girindra Mallik	INC	52734	51.26	Parimal Suklabaidya	BJP	38364	37.29	14370
12	Udharbond	Ajit Singh	INC	56755	61.41	Surendra Prasad Sinha	BJP	12320	13.33	44435
13	Lakhipur	Dinesh Prasad Goala	INC	51975	54.90	Reena Singh	BJP	21897	23.13	30078
14	Barkhola	Rumi Nath	INC	44824	50.68	Misbahul Islam Laskar	IND	34189	38.65	10635
15	Katigorah	Ataur Rahman Mazarbhuiya	AIUDF	33226	32.41	Anwarul Haque	INC	27084	26.42	6142
16	Haflong	Gobinda Ch. Langthasa	INC	38076	57.04	Kulendra Daulagupu	BJP	12588	18.86	25488
17	Bokajan	Klengdoon Engti	INC	53332	54.01	Jagat Sing Engti	IND	36524	36.99	16808
18	Howraghat	Khorsing Engti	INC	43014	50.57	Chomang Kro	IND	33279	39.13	9735
19	Diphu	Bidya Sing Engleng	INC	54022	45.98	George Millick	IND	41551	35.37	12471
20	Baithalangso	Mansing Rongpi	INC	64059	49.49	Jotson Bey	IND	54721	42.28	9338
21	Mankachar	Zabed Islam	IND	64639	45.86	Dr. Motiur Rohman Mondal	INC	53852	38.21	10787
22	Salmara South	Abdur Rahman Ajmal	AIUDF	62254	50.55	Wazed Ali Choudhury	INC	58498	47.50	3756
23	Dhubri	Jahan Uddin	AIUDF	53937	43.10	Nazibul Umar	INC	46455	37.12	7482
24	Gauripur	Banendra Kumar Mushahary	BPF	53849	40.43	Nizanur Rahman	AIUDF	37190	27.92	16659
25	Golakganj	Abu Taher Bepari	INC	59320	43.95	Aswini Roy Sarkar	BJP	55312	40.98	4008
26	Bilasipara West	Hafiz Bashir Ahmed	AIUDF	40501	36.19	Ali Akbar Miah	INC	36717	32.81	3784
27	Bilasipara East	Gul Akhtara Begum	AIUDF	49519	36.67	Prasanta Kumar Barua	AGP	25094	18.58	24425
28	Gossaigaon	Majendra Narzary	BPF	47543	36.20	Khairul Alam Miah	AIUDF	26598	20.25	20945
29	Kokrajhar West	Pradip Kumar Brahma	BPF	68838	57.58	Urkhao Gwra Brahma	IND	37335	31.23	31503
30	Kokrajhar East	Pramila Rani Brahma	BPF	74670	66.13	Kishore Basumatary	IND	28766	25.48	45904
31	Sidli	Chandan Brahma	BPF	68127	54.56	Maoti Brahma Hazowary	IND	31426	25.02	36701
32	Bongaigaon	Phani Bhusan Choudhury	AGP	45871	40.78	Prabhat Baisnab	INC	33474	29.76	12397
33	Bijni	Kamalshing Narzary	BPF	39861	41.83	Khalilur Rahman	INC	26536	27.84	13325
34	Abhayapuri North	Bhupen Roy	AGP	38111	36.32	Abdul Hai Nagori	INC	36574	34.85	1537
35	Abhayapuri South	Chandan Kumar Sarkar	INC	51510	42.24	Bijay Das	AIUDF	35621	29.21	15889
36	Dudhnai	Sib Charan Basumatary	INC	46890	37.33	Diganta Kumar Rava	AGP	40873	32.54	6017
37	Goalpara East	Monowar Hussain	AIUDF	36353	26.79	Jyotish Das	AGP	34511	25.43	1842
38	Goalpara West	Sheikh Shah Alam	AIUDF	37800	34.18	Purandar Rabha	AGP	26862	24.29	10938
39	Jaleswar	Moin Uddin Ahmed	AIUDF	52643	50.75	Aftab Uddin Mollah	INC	35847	34.55	16796
40	Sorbhog	Ranjit Kumar Dass	BJP	40716	31.25	A. Salim	AIUDF	21534	16.53	19182
41	Bhabanipur	Abul Kalam Azad	AIUDF	24756	26.85	Phanidhar Talukdar	IND	19714	21.38	5042
42	Patacharkuchi	Manoranjan Das	BJP	30829	34.96	Pabindra Deka	AGP	26248	29.76	4581
43	Barpeta	Abdur Rahim Khan	AIUDF	56915	43.39	Gunindra Nath Das	AGP	44606	34.01	12309
44	Jania	Rafiqul Islam	AIUDF	59978	52.23	Abdul Khaleque	INC	42464	36.98	17514
45	Baghbor	Sherman Ali Ahmed	AIUDF	60434	64.62	Rajib Ahmed	INC	28313	30.27	32121
46	Sarukhetri	Ali Hossain	AIUDF	51537	42.63	Tara Prasad Das	INC	23915	19.78	27622
47	Chenga	Sukur Ali Ahmed	INC	36886	42.06	Liakat Ali Khan	AGP	24404	27.83	12482
48	Boko	Gopinath Das	AIUDF	54388	38.52	Jayanta Das	INC	43697	30.95	10691
49	Chaygaon	Rekibuddun Ahmed	INC	64307	54.40	Kamala Kanta Kalita	AGP	48714	41.21	15593
50	Palasbari	Jatin Mali	IND	36718	34.68	Pranab Kalita	IND	36038	34.04	680
51	Jalukbari	Himanta Biswa Sarma	INC	93812	72.09	Prodyut Kumar Bora	BJP	16409	12.61	77403
52	Dispur	Akon Bora	INC	83096	41.48	Atul Bora	AGP	74849	37.37	8247
53	Gauhati East	Robin Bordoloi	INC	47727	37.44	Siddhartha Bhattacharya	BJP	43730	34.30	3997
54	Gauhati West	Hementa Talukdar	INC	54343	34.50	Manoj Ram Phookan	BJP	43017	27.31	11326
55	Hajo	Dwipen Pathak	TMC	33331	30.77	Kirip Chaliha	INC	27731	25.60	5600
56	Kamalpur	Jadab Chandra Deka	BJP	40288	37.32	Uttara Kalita	INC	28141	26.07	12147
57	Rangia	Ghanashyam Kalita	INC	34119	29.11	Thaneswar Boro	AGP	24045	20.52	10074
58	Tamulpur	Emmanuel Mosahary	BPF	44017	36.19	Chandi Basumatary	INC	39409	32.40	4608
59	Nalbari	Jayanta Malla Baruah	INC	39896	33.93	Alaka Sarma	AGP	31673	26.94	8223
60	Barkhetry	Bhumidhar Barman	INC	53958	45.54	Pulakesh Barua	AGP	47612	40.19	6346
61	Dharmapur	Nilamani Sen Deka	INC	50786	51.34	Chandra Mohan Patowary	AGP	45455	45.95	5331
62	Barama	Maneswar Brahma	BPF	42692	41.45	Rekha Rani Das Boro	IND	24373	23.66	18319
63	Chapaguri	Hitesh Basumatary	BPF	70981	70.57	Tijen Basumatary	AGP	19059	18.95	51922
64	Panery	Kamali Basumatari	BPF	38202	41.36	Santiuse Kujur	INC	37646	40.76	556
65	Kalaigaon	Mukunda Ram Choudhury	AGP	42550	37.38	Maheswar Baro	BPF	39742	34.91	2808
66	Sipajhar	Binanda Kumar Saikia	INC	51927	45.83	Zoii Nath Sarmah	IND	43181	38.11	8746
67	Mangaldoi	Basanta Das	INC	65440	45.36	Mahendra Das	AIUDF	41717	28.91	23723
68	Dalgaon	Ilias Ali	INC	62280	44.31	Mazibur Rahman	AIUDF	58616	41.71	3664
69	Udalguri	Rihon Daimary	BPF	40,970	43.43	Bhramon Baglari	IND	24776	26.26	16194
70	Majbat	Rakheswar Brahma	BPF	25268	27.77	Jitu Kissan	INC	23642	25.98	1626
71	Dhekiajuli	Habul Chakraborty	INC	45799	38.28	Apurba Kumar Bhattacharjee	AGP	25352	21.19	20447
72	Barchalla	Tanka Bahadur Rai	INC	47270	48.19	Ratul Kumar Nath	AGP	29696	30.27	17574
73	Tezpur	Rajen Borthakur	INC	43738	41.27	Brindaban Goswami	AGP	22156	20.90	21582
74	Rangapara	Bhimananda Tanti	INC	40364	40.32	Niranjan Nath	BJP	16838	16.82	23526
75	Sootea	Padma Hazarika	AGP	45155	41.35	Khemraj Chetri	CPI(M)	32362	29.63	12793
76	Biswanath	Prabin Hazarika	AGP	48104	45.51	Nurjamal Sarkar	INC	46605	44.09	1499
77	Behali	Pallab Lochan Das	INC	40798	50.44	Ranjit Dutta	BJP	22662	28.02	18136
78	Gohpur	Monika Bora	INC	60441	46.67	Utpal Borah	IND	24217	18.70	36224
79	Jagiroad	Bibekananda Dalai	INC	67659	48.00	Bubul Das	AGP	33211	23.56	34448
80	Marigaon	Jonjonali Baruah	INC	54264	48.02	Bireswar Medhi	AGP	27105	24.17	27159
81	Laharighat	Nazrul Islam	INC	53550	49.55	Farook Rahman Khan	AIUDF	40927	37.87	12623
82	Raha	Pijush Hazarika	INC	56430	43.51	Guneswar Das	AIUDF	38447	29.64	17983
83	Dhing	Aminul Islam	AIUDF	72457	54.92	Idris Ali	INC	53285	40.39	19172
84	Batadroba	Gautam Bora	INC	40950	39.92	Matiur Rahman	AIUDF	40819	39.79	131
85	Rupohihat	Mazibur Rahman	AIUDF	44441	37.11	Salma Jesmin	INC	44208	36.92	233
86	Nowgong	Durlav Chamua	INC	47977	42.14	Girindra Kumar Baruah	AGP	39957	35.10	8020
87	Barhampur	Prafulla Kumar Mahanta	AGP	55889	51.74	Suresh Borah	INC	39933	36.97	15956
88	Samaguri	Rakibul Hussain	INC	61332	57.12	Prafulla Kumar Mahanta	AGP	41472	38.62	19860
89	Kaliabor	Keshab Mahanta	AGP	44886	49.56	Tapan Borah	INC	35857	39.59	9029
90	Jamunamukh	Sirajuddin Ajmal	AIUDF	61267	50.08	Rejaul Karim Chowdhury	INC	48541	39.68	12726
91	Hojai	Ardhendu Kumar Dey	INC	70649	44.40	Aditya Langthasa	AIUDF	50755	31.90	19894
92	Lumding	Swapan Kar	AIUDF	39443	31.33	Sushil Dutta	BJP	37612	29.87	1831
93	Bokakhat	Arun Phukan	INC	32020	34.54	Jiten Gogoi	IND	30291	32.68	1729
94	Sarupathar	Aklius Tirkey	INC	74428	50.39	Binod Gowala	AGP	42335	28.66	32093
95	Golaghat	Ajanta Neog	INC	79648	64.88	Amiyo Kumar Borah	AGP	33477	27.27	46171
96	Khumtai	Bismita Gogoi	INC	41123	47.77	Upashana Gogoi	AGP	22734	26.41	18389
97	Dergaon	Aroti Hazarika Kachari	INC	55705	56.06	Sushila Hazarika	AGP	34445	34.66	21260
98	Jorhat	Rana Goswami	INC	68049	64.85	Hitendra Nath Goswami	AGP	30079	28.67	37970
99	Majuli	Rajib Lochan Pegu	INC	39655	46.36	Padmeswar Doley	IND	23691	27.70	15964
100	Titabar	Tarun Gogoi	INC	65418	74.12	Montu Moni Dutta	AGP	11219	12.71	54199
101	Mariani	Rupjyoti Kurmi	INC	35754	46.93	Alok Kumar Ghosh	TMC	28696	37.67	7058
102	Teok	Membor Gogoi	INC	48117	59.94	Hemanta Kalita	AGP	17784	22.16	30333
103	Amguri	Anjan Dutta	INC	39549	47.54	Prodip Hazarika	AGP	39263	47.20	286
104	Nazira	Debabrata Saikia	INC	52510	63.40	Drupad Borgohain	CPI	18700	22.58	33810
105	Mahmara	Sarat Saikia	INC	40607	47.71	Hiranya Kumar Konwar	AGP	24873	29.22	15734
106	Sonari	Sarat Barkotoky	INC	73327	53.38	Anup Singh Rajpuruhit	BJP	27751	26.15	28904
107	Thowra	Susanta Borgohain	INC	28560	39.98	Kushal Dowari	IND	24274	33.98	4286
108	Sibsagar	Pranab Kumar Gogoi	INC	48941	51.41	Pranabjit Chaliha	AGP	31691	33.29	17250
109	Bihpuria	Bhupen Kumar Borah	INC	45920	49.48	Kesharam Bora	AGP	33764	36.38	12156
110	Naoboicha	Sanjay Raj Subba	INC	33946	27.06	Mamun Imdadul Haque Chawdhury	AIUDF	27288	21.76	6658
111	Lakhimpur	Utpal Dutta	AGP	52563	47.46	Ghana Buragohain	INC	51464	46.47	1099
112	Dhakuakhana	Naba Kumar Doley	AGP	63963	50.31	Bharat Narah	INC	56456	44.40	7507
113	Dhemaji	Sumitra Patir	INC	59633	42.64	Paramananda Sonowal	AGP	52348	37.43	7285
114	Jonai	Pradan Baruah	INC	97326	52.89	Bhubon Pegu	IND	77816	42.28	19510
115	Moran	Jibantara Ghatowar	INC	47143	57.17	Sunil Rajkonwar	AGP	17650	21.40	29493
116	Dibrugarh	Prasanta Phukan	BJP	46506	55.15	Kalyan Kumar Gogoi	INC	26897	31.90	19609
117	Lahowal	Prithibi Majhi	INC	39857	46.90	Ranjit Konwar	BJP	20137	23.70	19720
118	Duliajan	Amiya Gogoi	INC	39511	42.17	Rameswar Teli	BJP	36175	38.61	3336
119	Tingkhong	Atuwa Munda	INC	41839	48.96	Anup Phukan	AGP	26315	30.80	15524
120	Naharkatia	Pranati Phukan	INC	35373	41.58	Naren Sonowal	AGP	20976	24.66	14397
121	Chabua	Raju Sahu	INC	38576	40.02	Binod Hazarika	BJP	27468	28.50	11108
122	Tinsukia	Rajendra Prasad Singh	INC	41238	44.15	Sanjoy Kishan	BJP	29265	31.33	11973
123	Digboi	Rameswar Dhanowar	INC	38663	50.04	Suren Phukan	BJP	27905	36.11	10758
124	Margherita	Pradyut Bordoloi	INC	57615	52.15	Kamakhya Prasad Tasa	BJP	41006	37.11	16609
125	Doomdooma	Dilip Moran	BJP	31709	37.00	Rupesh Gowala	INC	27053	31.57	4656
126	Sadiya	Bolin Chetia	INC	46318	44.95	Jagadish Bhuyan	AGP	39451	38.28	6867

== Aftermath ==
The elections resulted in a landslide victory for the Indian National Congress, with 78 seats for the Congress and 12 for the Bodoland People's Front. Tarun Gogoi became the second Chief Minister to be elected to three consecutive term after Bimala Prasad Chaliha and subsequently formed the Third Tarun Gogoi Ministry. The BPF remained in government, although the Congress had sufficient seats to form the government alone. The AIUDF emerged as the largest opposition party and won 18 of 126 seats.

The Congress did well across all the demographics of the state. ULFA leader, Arabinda Rajkhowa, was conciliatory towards the Assam government after the elections. Rajkhowa declared that "We have great expectations from his [Gogoi's] government. We hope it will work for peace and a final political settlement in Assam".

== Bypolls (2011–2016) ==
S.No	Date	Constituency	MLA before election	Party before election	Elected MLA	Party after election
8	24 February 2013	Algapur	Sahidul Alam Chodhary	Asom Gana Parishad	Mandira Roy	Indian National Congress
9	13 September 2014	Silchar	Sushmita Dev	Indian National Congress	Dilip Kumar Paul	Bharatiya Janata Party
13	13 September 2014	Lakhipur	Dinesh Prasad Goala	Indian National Congress	Rajdeep Goala	Indian National Congress
90	13 September 2014	Jamunamukh	Sirajuddin Ajmal	All India United Democratic Front	Abdur Rahim Ajmal	All India United Democratic Front
