= Sahidul Alam Choudhury =

Indian politician

Sahidul Alam Chodhary

Member of the Assam Legislative Assembly
- In office 1985–2006
- Preceded by: Abdul Jalil Choudhury
- Succeeded by: Rahul Roy
- Constituency: Algapur
- In office 2011–2012
- Preceded by: Rahul Roy
- Succeeded by: Mandira Roy
- Constituency: Algapur

Personal details
- Born: Algapur
- Died: 20 November 2012
- Party: Asom Gana Parishad

Sahidul Alam Chodhary (13 December 1946 – 20 November 2012) popularly known as Sahidul Minister was an Indian politician. He was the Minister of Municipal Administration Department and Public Health Engineering from 1985 to 1990. Then he became the Minister of Panchayat and Rural Development in 1996 in the AGP-led coalition government. Chodhary was elected to the Assam Legislative Assembly from Algapur constituency in the 1985, 1991, 1996, 2001 and 2011 Assam Legislative Assembly election as a member of the Asom Gana Parishad. The former minister died on 20 November 2012 at Indraprastha Appolo Hospital, Delhi when he was 65. He is survived by his wife Mamduda Yasmin Laskar and daughter Mehnaz Sahid Chodhary
