= Sukur Ali Ahmed =

Indian politician (died 2025)

Cabinet Minister, Assam
- In office 26 January 2015 – 24 May 2016
- Chief Minister: Tarun Gogoi
- Departments: Public Health Engineering; Welfare of Minorities and Haj
- Preceded by: Gautam Roy (PHE); Nazrul Islam (Minorities)
- Succeeded by: Rihon Daimary (PHE); Sarbananda Sonowal (Minorities)

Minister of State, Assam
- In office 7 June 2002 – 6 July 2004
- Chief Minister: Tarun Gogoi
- Departments: Public Health Engineering; Urban Development

Member, Assam Legislative Assembly for Chenga
- In office 2011–2021
- Preceded by: Liakat Ali Khan
- Succeeded by: Ashraful Hussain
- In office 1996–2006
- Preceded by: Liakat Ali Khan
- Succeeded by: Liakat Ali Khan

Personal details
- Born: 1958 or 1959
- Died: 4 June 2025 (aged 66) Guwahati, Assam, India
- Party: Indian National Congress

Sukur Ali Ahmed (1958 or 1959 – 4 June 2025) was an Indian politician. He was elected to the Assam Legislative Assembly from Chenga in the 1996, 2001, 2011 and 2016 elections as a member of the Indian National Congress. He also served as a minister in Third Tarun Gogoi ministry. Ahmed died on 4 June 2025, at the age of 66.
