= Gautam Roy =

Indian politician (born 1948)

- গৌতম ৰায়; গৌতম রায়

Cabinet Minister, Assam
- In office 22 September 2015 – 24 May 2016
- Chief Minister: Tarun Gogoi
- Portfolio: Social Welfare
- Preceded by: Tarun Gogoi
- Succeeded by: Sarbananda Sonowal
- In office 30 May 2011 – 26 January 2015
- Chief Minister: Tarun Gogoi
- Portfolio: Public Health Engineering
- Preceded by: Rihon Daimary
- Succeeded by: Sukur Ali Ahmed
- In office 21 May 2006 – 18 May 2011
- Chief Minister: Tarun Gogoi
- Portfolios: Excise; Border Areas Development
- Preceded by: Sarat Barkotoky (Excise); Tarun Gogoi (Border Areas)
- Succeeded by: Ajit Singh (Excise); Siddique Ahmed (Border Areas)
- In office 17 May 2001 – 21 May 2006
- Chief Minister: Tarun Gogoi
- Portfolios: Social Welfare; Sports and Youth Welfare (2001–2002); Relief and Rehabilitation (2004–2006)

Minister of State, Assam
- In office 30 June 1991 – 22 April 1996
- Chief Minister: Hiteswar Saikia
- Minister: Afzalur Rahman
- Portfolios: Panchayat and Rural Development; Community Development

Member, Assam Legislative Assembly
- In office 1985–2016
- Preceded by: Tajamul Ali Laskar
- Succeeded by: Suzam Uddin Laskar
- Constituency: Katlicherra

President, Assam Cricket Association
- In office 2002–2016
- Succeeded by: Himanta Biswa Sarma

Personal details
- Born: 14 November 1948 (age 77)
- Party: Bharatiya Janata Party (2019–present)
- Other political affiliations: Indian National Congress (1985–2019)
- Spouse: Mandira Roy
- Children: Rahul; Sutanuka
- Parent: Santosh Kumar Roy (father)

Gautam Roy (born 14 November 1948) is a politician of the Hailakandi District of Assam. He was six times MLA from Katlicherra constituency. He was also minister in Hiteswar Saikia and the Tarun Gogoi led Congress ministry several times. Gautam Roy was the vice president of BCCI and also the president of Assam Cricket Association. Currently he is a member of the Bharatiya Janata Party.

== Early life and education ==
Roy was born on 14 November 1948. His father, the late Santosh Kumar Roy, was a member of Assam Legislative Assembly for Katlicherra from 1972 to 1978.

Roy is an arts graduate from S.S. College from the 1969 batch.

== Political career ==
=== Indian National Congress ===
Roy is believed to have been introduced to politics by Santosh Mohan Dev.

Roy was the Indian National Congress candidate for the Katlicherra constituency in 1985, the same constituency his father had represented previously. He got 40,940 votes, 59.3% of the total vote, defeating his nearest opponent by 15,982 votes.

He was again the Indian National Congress candidate for Katlicherra in 1991. He was reelected, getting 41,297 votes which was 50.15% of the total vote. He defeated his nearest opponent by 8,515 votes. He was a minister in the Hiteswar Saikia cabinet.

He was reelected for Katlicherra in the 1996 Assam Legislative Assembly Election. He received 59,899 votes, 66.24% of the total vote and defeating his nearest opponent by 34,470 votes.

He was again reelected for Katlicherra in the 2001 Assam Legislative assembly election. He got 48,069 votes, 55.22% of the total vote. He defeated his nearest opponent by 34,691 votes. He became social welfare minister in the Tarun Gogoi cabinet,

In the 2006 Assam Legislative Assembly election, he was reelected, getting 44,834 votes and defeating his nearest opponent by 12,275 votes.

He was reelected in the 2011 Assam Legislative Assembly election. He was inducted again into the Tarun Gogoi cabinet as public health engineering minister, He was later made the social welfare minister again serving for about six months in 2015 and 2016.

In the 2016 Assam Legislative Assembly Election, he sought reelection. He received 35,592 votes, coming second to the current MLA for Katlicherra, Suzam Uddin Laskar.

In 2019, Roy was expelled from the Indian National Congress for alleged anti-party activities.

=== Bharatiya Janata Party ===
On 11 August 2019, Roy joined the Bharatiya Janata Party in the presence of the then finance minister Himanta Biswa Sarma. He was the Bharatiya Janata Party candidate for the Katigora constituency in the 2021 Assam Legislative Assembly Election. He received 76,329 votes, losing to the current Member of Assam Legislative Assembly for Katigora Khalil Uddin Mazumder.

== Personal life ==
Roy is married to Mandira Roy. His wife is a former member of Assam Legislative Assembly for Algapur, after winning a by-election in 2013. Roy and his wife have two children, Rahul and Sutanuka. His daughter Sutanuka is a former student of the London School of Economics. His son Rahul, like his wife, is a former member of Assam Legislative Assembly for Algapur serving from 2006 to 2011 on the Indian National Congress ticket. He was the candidate for the same constituency in 2011 and 2016 but lost both times. His son later registered as an independent and it was alleged that he had joined BJP, but it was later clarified he did not. His son sought the Udharbond constituency as an independent in the 2021 Assam Legislative Assembly election but lost. His son Rahul is married to Daisy Roy, who was also an independent candidate in the 2021 Assam Legislative Assembly election for Algapur but also lost.

== Other interests ==
Gautam Roy was the vice president of BCCI. He also served as the president of the Assam Cricket Association. As of 2022 he was the president of Hailakandi District Sports Association. He is also the president of Rabindra Mela Hailakandi.
