= Sashi Kanta Das =

Indian politician

Member of Assam Legislative Assembly
- Incumbent
- Assumed office 21 May 2021
- Preceded by: Dimbeswar Das
- Constituency: Raha

Personal details
- Born: Sashi Kanta Das
- Party: Indian National Congress (2021–2026); Bharatiya Janata Party (2026–present)
- Profession: politician, Social Worker

Sashi Kanta Das is an Indian politician from Assam. He was elected to the Assam Legislative Assembly from Raha in the 2021 Assam Legislative Assembly election as a member of the Indian National Congress.

On 5 March 2026, after having been suspended from the Congress, Das joined the Bharatiya Janata Party in time for the 2026 Assam Legislative Assembly election.
