= Mandira Roy =

Indian politician

Member of Assam Legislative Assembly
- In office 3 March 2013 - 2016
- Preceded by: Sahidul Alam Choudhury
- Succeeded by: Nizam Uddin Choudhury
- Constituency: Algapur

Personal details
- Political party: Indian National Congress
- Spouse: Gautam Roy
- Children: Rahul; Sutanuka

Mandira Roy is an Indian politician from the state of Assam. She is a former member of Assam Legislative Assembly, having won a by-election in 2013 for Algapur.

== Education and personal life ==
Roy has an H.S.L.C. from Indre Kumari Girls Higher Secondary School.

Roy is married to Gautam Roy, the son of Santosh Kumar Roy. The father and son were both former members of Assam Legislative Assembly for Katlicherra. Her husband also became a minister. Mandira and her husband have 2 children, Rahul and Sutanuka. Her son Rahul became a member of Assam Legislative Assembly for Algapur in 2006 and unsuccessfully sought reelection in 2011 and 2016. He also tried to contest the Udharbond seat in 2021 as an independent and lost. Rahul is married to Daisy Roy, who also contested in 2021 as an independent for Algapur but was unsuccessful.

== Political career ==
Roy was the Indian National Congress candidate for the constituency of Algapur, the same seat her son, Rahul, had represented from 2006 to 2011. The seat had become vacant, after the sitting AGP MLA, Sahidul Alam Choudhary, died on 20 November 2012. Roy polled 52,791 votes, defeating her nearest opponent by 991 votes. She took her oath of office and secrecy on March 3, 2013. She was administered her oath by Speaker Pranab Gogoi. She took the oath in Bengali, and was accompanied by her husband and son. She thanked UPA chairperson Sonia Gandhi, Chief Minister Tarun Gogoi and Assam Pradesh Congress president Bhubaneswar Khalita for the opportunity to serve in the assembly.

She did not seek reelection and her son was the Congress candidate in 2016 but lost.
