= Jagannath Sinha =

Indian politician

Member of the Assam Legislative Assembly
- In office 1967–1978
- Preceded by: Dwarika Nath Tewari
- Succeeded by: Jagannath Singh
- Constituency: Udharbond
- In office 1996–2001
- Preceded by: Jagannath Singh
- Succeeded by: Ajit Singh
- Constituency: Udharbond

Personal details
- Party: Indian National Congress

Jagannath Sinha is an Indian politician from the state of Assam. He was elected to the Assam Legislative Assembly from Udharbond constituency in the 1967, 1972 and 1996 Assam Legislative Assembly election as a member of the Indian National Congress.
