= Santosh Kumar Roy (Assam politician) =

Indian politician

Member of Assam Legislative Assembly
- In office 1972 - 1978
- Preceded by: Tajamul Ali Laskar
- Succeeded by: Gourishankar Roy
- Constituency: Katlicherra

Personal details
- Political party: Indian National Congress
- Spouse: Shefalika Roy
- Children: 6, including Gautam Roy
- Relatives: Mandira Roy (Daughter in law); Rahul Roy (Grandson)
- Occupation: Politician

Santosh Kumar Roy was an Indian politician from the state of Assam. He was a former Member of Assam Legislative Assembly for Katlicherra. He was the father of Gautam Roy, father in law of Mandira Roy, grandfather of Rahul Roy and grandfather in law of Daisy Roy.

== Personal life ==
Roy married Shefalika Roy in 1939 and had 5 daughters and one son.

== Political career ==
In the 1972 Assam Legislative Assembly election, Roy was the Indian National Congress candidate for the constituency of Katlicherra. He received 23988 votes, 54.02% of the total vote. He defeated his nearest independent opponent by 6851 votes. He served until the 1978 Assam Legislative Assembly Election, where the former MLA for Katlicherra, Gourishankar Roy, was instead the Congress candidate for Katlicherra and won the election. His son, Gautam Roy, would later go on to represent the same constituency.
