= Raghunandan Dhubi =

Indian politician

Member of the Assam Legislative Assembly
- In office 1952–1957
- Preceded by: New constituency
- Succeeded by: Ram Prasad Choubey
- Constituency: Lakhipur

Personal details
- Party: Indian National Congress

Raghunandan Dhubi is an Indian politician and former MLA from Assam. Dhubi was elected to the Assam Legislative Assembly from Lakhipur constituency in the 1952 election as a member of the Indian National Congress.
