= Singerband =

Singerband Hingerband
- village
- Location in Assam, India Singerband (India)
- Coordinates: 24°47′34.05″N 92°57′03.44″E
- Country: India
- State: Assam
- District: Cachar district

Population (2011 census)
  - Total: 11,293

Languages
  - Official: Bengali and Meitei (Manipuri)
- Time zone: UTC+5:30 (IST)
- Vehicle registration: AS
- Nearest city: Silchar
- Lok Sabha constituency: Silchar
- Vidhan Sabha constituency: Lakhipur

Singerband or Singerbond is a village under Singerband Gaon Panchayat in the district of Cachar (Assam), India under Lakhipur sub division.

Bengali and Meitei (Manipuri) are the official languages of this place.

== Geography ==
Singerband is situated in the southern side of Borak River. Lakhipur is the nearest subdivisional town where the villagers trade their agricultural products. The villagers use the ferry ghats to reach their subdivisional town by boat. There is a connecting river bridge at Binnakandi Part 1 to their sub-divisional town. During the monsoon season the condition of roads deteriorate.

== Facilities ==
It has one Public health centre, four lower primary school, 3 high school including one English medium school, one Junior college. It has two small markets.

The population of Singerband is around 50/50 Muslim and Hindu. Majority of the people belong to Manipuri.
