= Mera Chouba Singha =

Indian politician

Member of the Assam Legislative Assembly
- In office 1967–1972
- Preceded by: Ram Prasad Choubey
- Succeeded by: Kazi Kutubuddin Ahmed
- Constituency: Lakhipur

Personal details
- Party: Indian National Congress

Mera Chouba Singha is an Indian politician who was elected to the Assam Legislative Assembly from Lakhipur constituency in the 1967 Assam Legislative Assembly election as a member of the Indian National Congress, serving two terms from 1967-78.
