= Udalguri Assembly constituency =

Constituency of the Assam legislative assembly in India

Udalguri
- Constituency No. 46 for the Assam Legislative Assembly

Constituency details
- Country: India
- Region: Northeast India
- State: Assam
- District: Udalguri
- Lok Sabha constituency: Darrang–Udalguri
- Established: 1978
- Reservation: ST

Member of Legislative Assembly
- 16th Assam Legislative Assembly
- Incumbent Rihon Daimary
- Party: BPF
- Alliance: NDA
- Elected year: 2026

Udalguri is one of the 126 constituencies of the Assam Legislative Assembly Religion . Udalguri forms part of the Darrang–Udalguri Lok Sabha constituency. (Religion Wise Population Hinduism 73 Muslim 13 christian 12 Percentage

== Members of Legislative Assembly ==
Year	Name	Party
1967	Bahadur Basumatary	Indian National Congress
1972	Bahadur Basumatary	Indian National Congress
1978	Binoy Kumar Basumatary	Plain Tribals Council of Assam
1983	Binoy Kumar Basumatary	Plain Tribals Council of Assam
1985	Binal Khungur Basumatari	Independent
1991	Jaman Singh Brahma	Indian National Congress
1996	Deva Kanta Ramchiary	Independent
2001	Rihon Daimary	Independent
2006	Rihon Daimary	Independent
2011	Rihon Daimary	Bodoland People's Front
2016	Rihon Daimary	Bodoland People's Front
2021	Gobinda Chandra Basumatari	United People's Party Liberal

== Election results ==
=== 2026 ===
2026 Assam Legislative Assembly election: Udalguri
Party	Candidate	Votes	%	±%
BPF	Rihon Daimary	76,800	54.61	
UPPL	Dipen Baro	49,246	35.01	
INC	Soren Daimari	9,429	6.70	
NOTA	NOTA	2588	1.84	
Margin of victory		27,554	19.64	
Turnout		1,40,646		
Rejected ballots				
Registered electors				
BPF gain from INC		Swing		

=== 2021 ===
2021 Assam Legislative Assembly election: Udalguri
Party	Candidate	Votes	%	±%
UPPL	Gobinda Chandra Basumatari	61,767	50.43	
BPF	Rihon Daimari	56,916	46.47	
NOTA	None of the above	3,805	3.11	
Majority		4,851	3.06	
Turnout		1,22,488	77.17	
Registered electors		1,58,724		
UPPL gain from BPF		Swing		
