= Pankaj Bora =

Indian politician and social worker

Minister of Education, Government of Assam
- In office 7 June 2002 – 6 July 2004
- Chief Minister: Tarun Gogoi

Member of Parliament, Rajya Sabha
- In office 16 December 2011 – 2 April 2016
- Preceded by: Silvius Condpan
- Succeeded by: Ripun Bora
- Constituency: Assam

Member, Assam Legislative Assembly
- In office 10 May 2001 – 11 May 2006
- Preceded by: Biraj Kumar Sarma
- Succeeded by: Robin Bordoloi
- Constituency: Gauhati East

Personal details
- Born: 6 March 1946 (age 79)
- Political party: Indian National Congress
- Spouse: Bani Bora
- Profession: Politician, Social Worker

Pankaj Bora (born 6 March 1946 in Guwahati, District Kamrup (Assam)) is an Indian social worker, politician and a Member of Parliament (Rajya Sabha) elected from Assam, India as an Indian National Congress candidate.

He completed BA from Cotton College at Guwahati in 1967.
