= Lakhipur =

- Town
- Location in Assam, India Lakhipur (India)
- Coordinates: 24.8°N 93.02°E
- Country: India
- State: Assam
- District: Cachar
- Named for: Kachari King Lakshmi Narayana Hasnusa

Government
  - Body: Lakhipur Municipal Board
- Elevation: 22 m (72 ft)

Population (2011)
  - Total: 10,277

Languages
  - Official: Bengali, Meitei (Manipuri)
- Time zone: UTC+5:30 (IST)
- PIN: 788103
- Telephone code: (0091) 03843
- ISO 3166 code: IN-AS
- Vehicle registration: AS

Lakhipur (Bengali pronunciation: [lokkʰipur]), is a town and a municipal board in Cachar district in the Indian state of Assam. It serves as the administrative headquarters of the Lakhipur Sub-Division, one of the three sub-divisions of Cachar. Situated in the scenic Barak Valley, Lakhipur lies close to the border of Manipur, making it an important trade and transit point between the two states. The region is known for its tea gardens, diverse communities, and a mix of Bengali, Manipuri, and Dimasa cultural influences.

== Etymology ==
One tradition holds that the name Lakhipur derives from the Hindu goddess Lakshmi (symbol of wealth and prosperity). Another theory attributes the name to notable Dimasa Kachari King Laxminarayan, who ruled this part of the country in ancient times.

== Geography ==
The town is located at approximately 24.8°N 93.02°E at an average elevation of 22 metres (72 feet) above sea level. Lakhipur lies on the plains of the Barak River basin, surrounded by low hills on the eastern and northern fringes. The region experiences a humid subtropical climate, with heavy monsoon rainfall between May and October and mild winters. The fertile alluvial soil supports rice, areca nut, and tea cultivation.

== Demographics ==
According to the 2011 Census of India, Lakhipur Town had a population of 10,277, comprising 5,168 males and 5,109 females. The town recorded an average literacy rate of 90.97 % higher than state average of 72.19 %, with Male literacy is around 94.62 % while female literacy rate is 87.29 %.

The population includes communities such as Bengali Hindus and Muslims, Manipuri Meiteis, Dimasa, and Tea-Tribe groups. Bengali and Meitei (Manipuri) are the principal languages, while Assamese and Hindi are also widely understood.

Religious practices in Lakhipur reflect the area’s plural identity, with major Hindu temples, mosques, and Meitei religious sites coexisting in close proximity.

== Administration ==
Lakhipur functions as a Municipal Board under the Urban Development Department of Assam and is divided into 10 municipal wards. It serves as the administrative headquarters of the Lakhipur Sub-Division, one of the three sub-divisions of Cachar district.

Key government offices located in Lakhipur include those of the Sub-Divisional Officer (Civil), Police, Education, Public Works, Agriculture, and Health departments. The Lakhipur Police Station oversees law and order across the sub-division.

== Economy ==
The economy of Lakhipur and its surrounding region is primarily agrarian. Major agricultural products include rice, betel nut, tea, and vegetables. Several tea estates—such as Jatinga Valley, Rajnagar, Binnakandi, and Sonai—play an important role in local employment and exports.

Small-scale industries include handloom weaving, bamboo craft, and food processing. Due to its border location, Lakhipur also acts as a commercial link between Cachar and Manipur, with growing retail, transport, and warehousing sectors.

== Lakhipur Sub-Division ==
Lakhipur is sub-district in Cachar district. The Lakhipur Civil Sub-Division is bounded by in the East Manipur State, West – Silchar Sadar Sub-Division, North – Dima Hasao Autonomous District Border and South – Sonai Circle. The total population of the Sub-Division is estimated at 2,52,642 (approx). The Sub-Division has maintained a unique unity in diversity although it has a population belonging to different castes, languages, religions and culture.

The Lakhipur sub-division comprises six community development blocks — Lakhipur, Binnakandi Banskandi, Rajabazar, Sonai and Udharbond — and coordinates governance, development, and public service delivery across a mix of urban and rural areas.

Lakhipur Assembly constituency is one of the 126 state legislative assembly constituencies in Assam, and current MLA is Kaushik Rai of BJP. Lakhipur is part of Silchar (Lok Sabha constituency).

== Notable people ==
- Kaushik Rai - MLA of Lakhipur
- Rajdeep Goala - Former MLA of Lakhipur
- Dinesh Prasad Goala - Former MLA of Lakhipur

== See also ==
- Lakhipur Vidhan Sabha
