= Ajit Singh (Assam politician) =

Indian politician

Minister for Excise, Sports and Youth Welfare
- In office 23 January 2015 – 19 May 2016
- Chief Minister: Tarun Gogoi
- Succeeded by: Sarbananda Sonowal (Sports & Youth Welfare); Parimal Suklabaidya (Excise)

Minister of state (Independent Charge) for Excise, Sports and Youth Welfare
- In office 27 May 2011 – 19 January 2015
- Chief Minister: Tarun Gogoi
- Preceded by: Gautam Roy (Excise)

Member of Assam Legislative Assembly
- In office 1998 - 19 May 2016
- Preceded by: Jagannath Singh
- Succeeded by: Mihir Kanti Shome
- Constituency: Udharbond

Personal details
- Born: 25 November 1960 (age 65)
- Party: Indian National Congress (1993-present)
- Spouse: Kusum Singh (m. 1993)
- Children: 2
- Parent(s): Dwarika Prasad Singh (Father); Sanjari Devi (Mother)
- Education: Gurucharan College
- Occupation: Politician; Trade Unionist

Ajit Singh (born 25 November 1960) is an Indian politician from the state of Assam. He served as Member of Assam Legislative Assembly from Udharbond (1998 to 2016), as minister of state (2011 to 2015) and as a cabinet minister (2015 to 2016). He has contested the Udharbond constituency every election since 1998.

== Early life and education ==
Singh was born on 25 November 1960 to the late Dwarika Prasad Singh and the late Sanjari Devi. Singh has a HSLC from Govt. Boys H.S. School Silchar in 1977 and a BSC From GC College Silchar in 1987.

== Political career ==
=== Early political career ===
Singh was the INC candidate for the Udharbond constituency in a 1998 by-election. He received 34879 votes, defeating his nearest opponent by 14156 votes and became MLA of Udharbond.

Singh was the Indian National Congress candidate in the 2001 Assam Legislative Assembly election for Udharbond. He received 30657 votes, 43.47% of the total vote. He defeated his nearest opponent by 3989 votes.

Singh sought reelection in the 2006 Assam Legislative Assembly election in Udharbond. He received 39432 votes, defeating his nearest opponent by 17245 votes.

Singh again sought reelection in the 2011 Assam Legislative Assembly election in Udharbond. He received 56755 votes, 61.41% of the total vote, defeating his nearest opponent by 44435 votes.

=== Ministership ===
==== Minister of State ====
On 27 May 2011, Singh was inducted into the Third Tarun Gogoi cabinet, as one of four ministers of state with independent charge. He became Minister of state for Excise, Sports and Youth Welfare.

In June 2011, Singh distributed funds for the development of sports in rural areas and in women's sports. Singh stated that emphasis will be accorded in the development of rural areas.

In July 2011, during the ongoing session of the state he stated that 116 youths were undergoing training at centres without any coaches.

On 3 March 2012, Singh along with an additional chief secretary visited the Bhuvan Valley Tea estate, at the behest of Chief Minister Tarun Gogoi due to 14 tea workers dying, possibly of starvation.

Singh attended the meeting in honour of 150th birth anniversary of Rabindranath Tagore.

On 29 June 2012, Singh along with irrigation minister Ardhendu Kumar Dey visited several flooded areas in Barak Valley by boat.

Following the ASEAN car rally in December 2012, in an evening Singh hosted a dinner.

After the delaying of a 201 km broad gauge project connecting Lumding with Silchar, hundreds of protesters gathered outside Singh's house requesting the immediate completion of the railway project.

In June 2013, following the return of Everesters from Assam, Singh attended the reception for their return.

In August 2013, after Chief Minister Tarun Gogoi asked for the revival of Assam Flying Club, the sports commissioner submitted minutes of meetings to Singh.

Singh resigned along with all members of the cabinet on 19 January 2015.

==== Cabinet Minister ====
Singh was inducted into the new ministry, however he was promoted to a cabinet minister. He was made minister for excise, sports and youth welfare.

On 26 April 2015, Singh, while speaking at a function in the premises of the flag station here today, said his ministry "has laid stress on development of better infrastructure for augmenting the fleet of bus services and also modernization, keeping in view the increasing number of commuters and their expectations of better services from the ASTC". He also addressed how this was his vision for Barak Valley, and other areas.

In the 2016 Assam Legislative assembly election, Singh sought reelection in Udharbond. He received 45598 votes, 40.65% of the total vote. He was defeated by BJP candidate and the incumbent MLA of Udharbond Mihir Kanti Shome by 8606 votes. He was one of ten cabinet ministers who lost in the election.

=== Post-ministerial career ===
In the 2021 Assam Legislative Assembly election, Singh was again the Indian National Congress for Udharbond. He received 59060 votes, 45.28% of the total vote. He again lost to Mihir Kanti Shome by 2685 votes.

== Personal life ==
Singh married Smt. Kusum Singh on 11 March 1993 and they had one daughter and one son. Singh enjoys reading, travelling, sports and gardening. He also enjoys watching TV and reading books and journals. He enjoys working for the upliftment of the weaker sections of society and he attended a three-month conference in Singapore related to Trade Union activities.

== Positions ==
- Assistant General Secretary, Cachar Sramik Union.
- Assistant General Secretary, INTUC
- Chairman, INTUC, Young Council, Assam and other socio-economic organisations
- General Secretary, Indian National Plantation Workers Federation
- Secretary, APCC (I)
- Vice Chairman, Assam Livestock & Poultry Farm
- MLA Udharbond
- Chairman, Petition Committee in 11th ALA
- Member, STA
- Chairman, ATDC
- Parliamentary Secretary, Finance, Government of Assam
- Minister of State (IC), Excise and Sports & Youth Welfare, Government of Assam
- Cabinet Minister for excise, sports and youth welfare
