= Rihon Daimary =

Indian politician

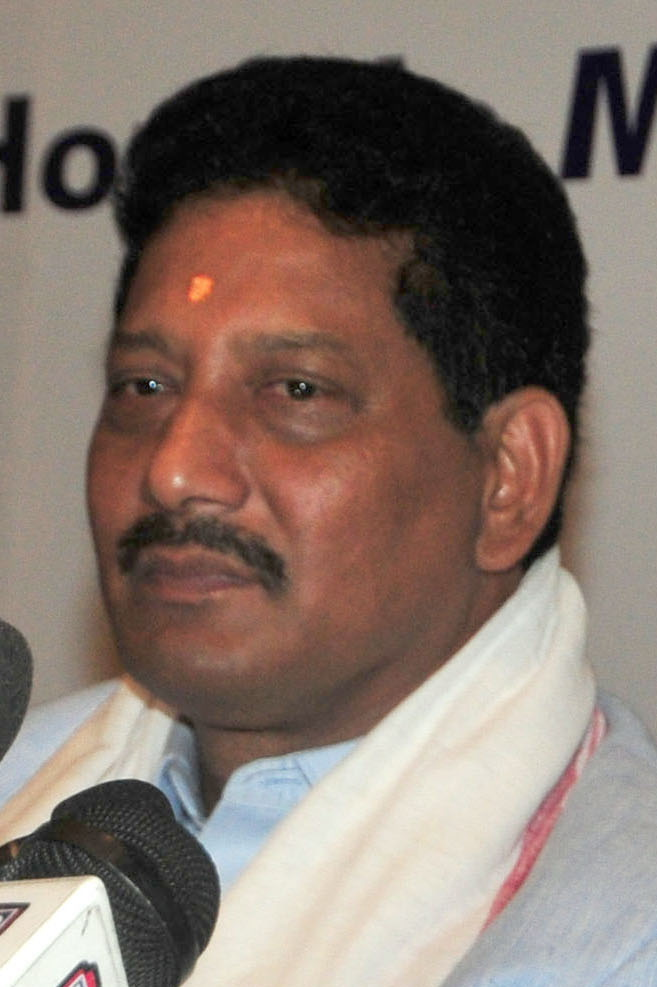

Deputy Chief Executive Member of the Bodoland Territorial Council
- Incumbent
- Assumed office 5 October 2025
- Governor: Lakshman Acharya
- Chief Executive Member: Hagrama Mohilary
- Department: Agriculture
- Preceded by: Gobinda Basumatary

Cabinet Minister, Assam
- In office 25 May 2016 – 10 May 2021
- Chief Minister: Sarbananda Sonowal
- Departments: Public Health Engineering; Food, Civil Supplies and Consumer Affairs (2016–18); Co-operation (2018–20)
- Preceded by: Sukur Ali Ahmed (PHE); Nazrul Islam (FCS&CA); Himanta Biswa Sarma (Co-operation)
- Succeeded by: Ranjeet Kumar Dass (PHE); Phani Bhusan Choudhury (FCS&CA); Siddhartha Bhattacharya (Co-operation)

Minister of State (Independent Charge), Assam
- In office 21 May 2006 – 18 May 2011
- Chief Minister: Tarun Gogoi
- Department: Public Health Engineering
- Preceded by: Dinesh Prasad Goala
- Succeeded by: Gautam Roy

Member, Assam Legislative Assembly
- In office 13 May 2001 – 2 May 2021
- Preceded by: Deva Kanta Ramchiary
- Succeeded by: Gobinda Chandra Basumatary
- Constituency: Udalguri (ST)

Personal details
- Born: 1 January 1960 (age 66) Udalguri, Assam
- Party: Bodoland People's Front

Rihon Daimary (born 1 January 1960 in Udalguri, Assam) is an Indian politician and former lawmaker from the state of Assam.He currently serves as the Deputy Chief executive member of the Bodoland Territorial Council since 2025. He was a member of the Assam Legislative Assembly from the Bodoland People's Front until 2021. He became a minister in the Sarbananda Sonowal-led government in 2016. He was elected for the fourth time from the Udalguri constituency.

== Electoral history ==
=== Legislative Assembly elections ===
Year	Constituency	Party	Votes	%	Opponent		Result	Margin
2001	Udalguri (ST)	Independent	30,170	38.4%	Jaman Singh Brahma	INC	Won	2,323
2006	Udalguri (ST)	BPF	35,560	41.6%	Jaman Singh Brahma	INC	Won	4,875
2011	Udalguri (ST)	BPF	40,970	43.4%	Bhramon Baglari	Independent	Won	16,194
2016	Udalguri (ST)	BPF	45,037	41.9%	Anjali Prabha Daimari	Independent	Won	24,374
2021	Udalguri (ST)	BPF	56,916	48.0%	Gobinda Chandra Basumatary	UPPL	Lost	4,851
2026	Udalguri (ST)	BPF	27554	54.61	Dipen Baro	UPPL	Won	27554
