= Siddhartha Bhattacharya =

Indian politician

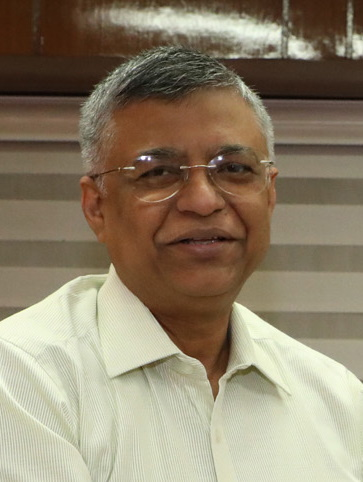

Cabinet Minister, Assam
- In office 26 April 2018 – 10 May 2021
- Chief Minister: Sarbananda Sonowal
- Departments: Law and Justice; Guwahati Development; Education (2018–20); Co-operation (2020–21)
- Preceded by: Sarbananda Sonowal (Law); Himanta Biswa Sarma (GDD, Education); Rihon Daimary (Co-operation)
- Succeeded by: Himanta Biswa Sarma (Law, Education); Atul Bora (Co-operation); Ashok Singhal (GDD)

President, Assam Pradesh Bharatiya Janata Party
- In office 17 August 2014 – 21 November 2015
- Preceded by: Sarbananda Sonowal
- Succeeded by: Sarbananda Sonowal

Member, Assam Legislative Assembly
- In office 19 May 2016 – 4 May 2026
- Preceded by: Robin Bordoloi
- Constituency: Gauhati East

Personal details
- Born: 10 June 1961 (age 65)
- Party: Bharatiya Janata Party
- Parent: Gaurishankar Bhattacharyya
- Relatives: Arnab Goswami (nephew)
- Education: Gauhati University (MA, LLB)
- Profession: Advocate
- Website: siddharthabhattacharya.in

Siddhartha Bhattacharya (born 10 June 1961) is an Indian politician from the state of Assam.He is the son of former Leader of Opposition,Assam, Gaurishankar Bhattacharyya. He was a Cabinet Minister of Education of Assam and a Member of the Assam Legislative Assembly from Bharatiya Janata Party.

He had joined Bharatiya Janata Party in 1995 and was party President of Assam unit in 2014 but was replaced by Sarbananda Sonowal ahead of 2016 Assam Legislative Assembly election. He is a National Spokesperson for the Bharatiya Janata Party for the North Eastern region.

Bhattacharya was defeated from Gauhati East constituency seat in 2011 Assam Legislative Assembly election with margin of 3,997 votes by Robin Bordoloi of Indian National Congress. But, he won Gauhati East constituency in 2016 Assam Legislative Assembly election by defeating Bobeeta Sharma of Indian National Congress by a record margin of 96,637 votes.

Bhattacharya is maternal uncle of Indian journalist Arnab Goswami.

== Electoral history ==
| Year | Constituency | Party | Votes | % | Opponent | | Result | Margin |
|---|---|---|---|---|---|---|---|---|
| 2011 | Gauhati East | BJP | 43,730 | 34.3% | Robin Bordoloi | INC | Lost | 3,997 |
| 2016 | Gauhati East | BJP | 1,27,602 | 79.1% | Bobbeeta Sharma | INC | Won | 96,637 |
| 2021 | Gauhati East | BJP | 1,13,461 | 67.7% | Ashima Bardoloi | INC | Won | 84,100 |
