= Liakat Ali Khan =

Indian politician (1955–2019)

Member of the Assam Legislative Assembly for Chenga
- In office 1991–1996
- Preceded by: Mukhtar Hussain
- Succeeded by: Sukur Ali Ahmed
- In office 2006–2011
- Preceded by: Sukur Ali Ahmed
- Succeeded by: Sukur Ali Ahmed

Personal details
- Born: 1 May 1955
- Died: 25 September 2019 (aged 64)
- Party: Bharatiya Janata Party
- Children: Two
- Education: Gauhati University

Liakat Ali Khan (1955 – 25 September 2019) was an Indian politician belonging to Bharatiya Janata Party. He was twice elected to the Assam Legislative Assembly from Chenga.

== Biography ==
Khan was born in 1955. He was elected as a member of the Assam Legislative Assembly in 1991 from the Chenga constituency as an independent candidate. He supported Indian National Congress to form the government in Assam. He was appointed the chairman of Agro Industry Board by Assam Government. Later he joined Indian National Congress.

He was elected to the state assembly a second time from Chenga in 2006 as an Asom Gana Parishad candidate. Before assembly election in 2016 he joined All India United Democratic Front. He left this party and joined Bharatiya Janata Party in 2017 where he served as an executive member of the state unit.

Khan died on 25 September 2019 at the age of 64.
