= Binnakandi Ghat =

Binnakandi Ghat Ghat
- Village
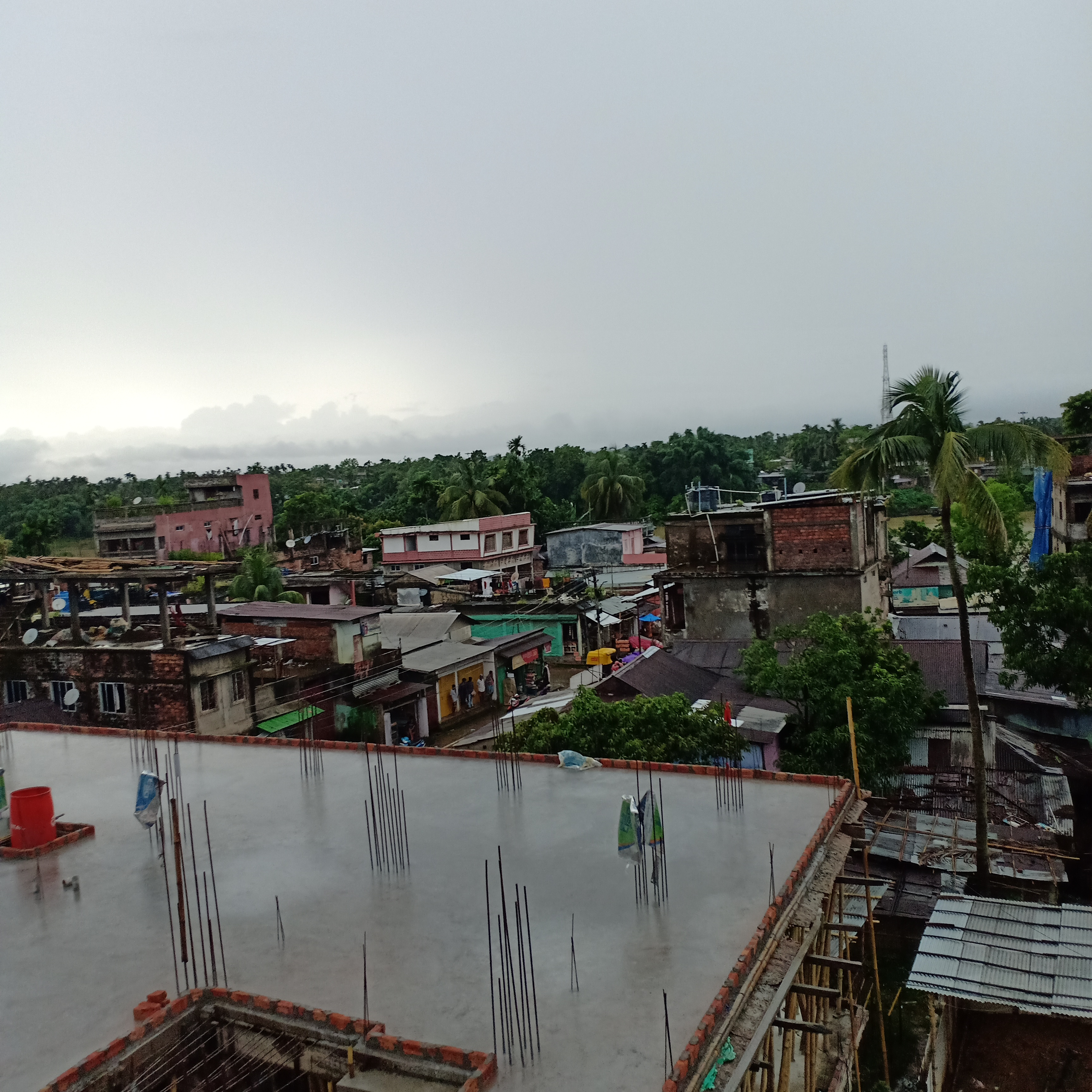
- Bird's-eye view of Binnakandi Ghat

- Location in Assam, India Binnakandi Ghat (India)
- Coordinates: 24°47′19″N 92°59′59″E
- Country: India
- State: Assam
- District: Cachar
- Founded by: British(Before Indian Independence); Indian Government (After Indian Independence)
- Named after: An Extinct Flower

Languages
  - Official: Bengali and Meitei (Manipuri)
- Time zone: UTC+5:30 (IST)
- Vehicle registration: AS 11
- Nearest city: Silchar
- Lok Sabha constituency: Silchar
- Vidhan Sabha constituency: Lakhipur

Binnakandi Ghat is a village under Binnakandi Gaon Panchayat in the District of Cachar (Assam), India under Lakhipur sub division.

Bengali and Meitei (Manipuri) are the official languages of this place.

== Gallery ==
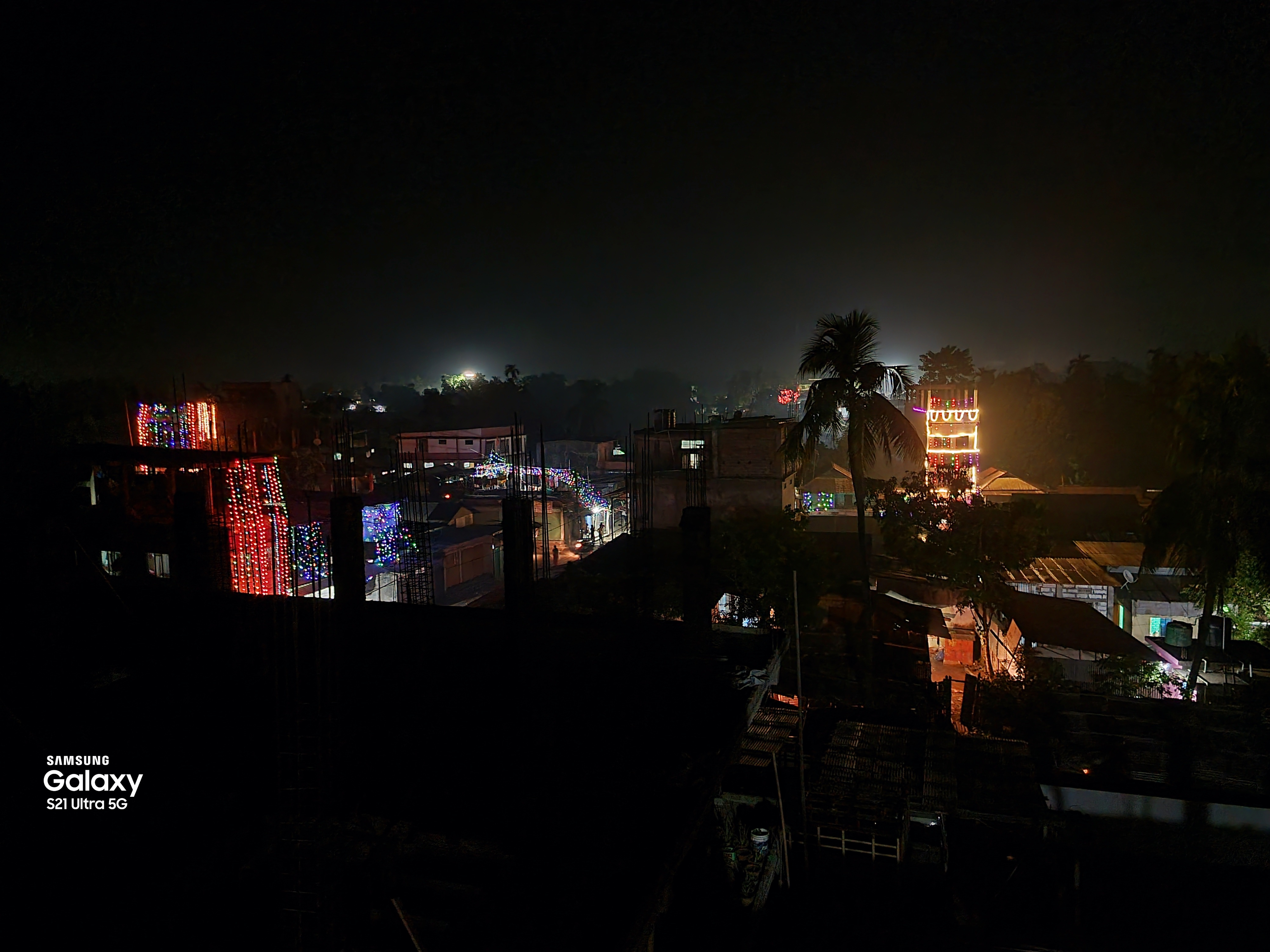
Ghat diwali

== Notable people ==
- Dinesh Prasad Goala - Former MLA of Lakhipur
- Rajdeep Goala - Former MLA of Lakhipur
