= Raha Assembly constituency =

Assembly constituency of Assam

Raha
- Constituency No. 61 for the Assam Legislative Assembly

Constituency details
- Country: India
- Region: Northeast India
- State: Assam
- District: Nagaon
- Lok Sabha constituency: Nagaon
- Established: 1962
- Reservation: SC

Raha is one of the 126 assembly constituencies of Assam Legislative Assembly. Raha forms part of the Nagaon Lok Sabha constituency. It is reserved for Scheduled Caste candidates.

== Members of the Legislative Assembly ==
Election	Member	Party
1962	Mahendra Nath Hazarika	Indian National Congress
1967	Sarat Chandra Goswami	Indian National Congress
1972	Gunendra Nath Pandit	Indian National Congress
1978	Baliram Das	Janata Party
1983	Lakhi Prasad Hazarika	Indian National Congress
1985	Umesh Chandra Das	Independent politician
1991	Gahin Chandra Das	Asom Gana Parishad
1996	Gahin Chandra Das	Asom Gana Parishad
2001	Ananda Ram Baruah	Indian National Congress
2006	Guneswar Das	Assam United Democratic Front
2011	Pijush Hazarika	Indian National Congress
2016	Dimbeswar Das	Bhartiya Janata Party
2021	Sashi Kanta Das	Indian National Congress
2026	Sashi Kanta Das	Bhartiya Janata Party

== Election results ==
=== 2026 ===
2026 Assam Legislative Assembly election: Raha
Party	Candidate	Votes	%	±%
BJP	Sashi Kanta Das	111,360	53.43	
INC	Utpal Bania	90,766	43.55	
AIUDF	MUKUT DAS	2,595	1.25	
NOTA	NOTA	1,958	0.94	
Margin of victory		20,594		
Turnout		208408		
Rejected ballots				
Registered electors				
BJP gain from INC		Swing		

=== 2016 ===
2016 Assam Legislative Assembly election: Raha
Party	Candidate	Votes	%	±%
BJP	Dimbeswar Das	76,941	47.6%	
INC	Sashi Kanta Das	43867		
Majority				
Turnout				
Registered electors				
gain from		Swing		
