= Atul Bora (BJP politician) =

Indian politician

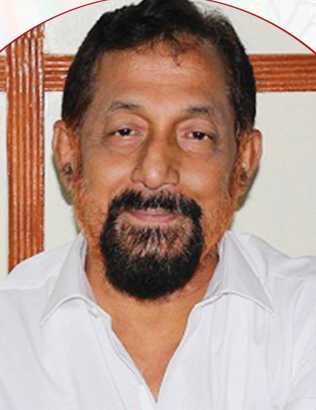

Cabinet Minister, Assam
- In office 15 May 1996 – 17 May 2001
- Chief Minister: Prafulla Kumar Mahanta
- Department: Public Works
- Preceded by: Golok Rajbanshi
- Succeeded by: Sarat Barkotoky
- In office 24 December 1985 – 28 November 1990
- Chief Minister: Prafulla Kumar Mahanta
- Departments: Public Works; Town and Country Planning
- Preceded by: Anwara Taimur (PWD); Jagannath Singh (T&CP)
- Succeeded by: Golok Rajbanshi

Member, Assam Legislative Assembly
- In office 19 May 2016 – 4 May 2026
- Preceded by: Akon Bora
- Constituency: Dispur
- In office 1985 – 13 May 2001
- Preceded by: Tarini Mohan Barua
- Succeeded by: Robin Bordoloi

Personal details
- Born: 7 April 1960 (age 66) Assam
- Party: Bharatiya Janata Party
- Other political affiliations: Asom Gana Parishad (1985–2012)
- Education: Gauhati University
- Occupation: Politician

Atul Bora is a Bharatiya Janata Party politician from Assam. He has been elected to the Assam Legislative Assembly in the 1985 to 1996 and 2016 elections from Dispur. He was a founding member of Asom Gana Parishad. He joined Bharatiya Janata Party in 2013. He was also a minister in First Prafulla Kumar Mahanta government.
