= Gauhati East Assembly constituency =

Constituency of the Assam legislative assembly in India

Coordinates: 26.17°N 91.82°E

Gauhati East
- Former constituency No. 53 for the Assam Legislative Assembly

Constituency details
- Country: India
- Region: Northeast India
- State: Assam
- District: Kamrup Metropolitan
- Lok Sabha constituency: Gauhati
- Established: 1967
- Abolished: 2023
- Reservation: None

Gauhati East Assembly constituency was one of the 126 assembly constituencies of Assam a northeast state of India. Gauhati East was also part of Gauhati Lok Sabha constituency. The Gauhati East constituency was the only fully urban Legislative Assembly constituency of Assam. Located in the heart of the city of Guwahati, the capital city of Assam, the constituency included areas such as Pan Bazar, Uzan Bazar, Fancy Bazar, Paltan Bazar, etc. which made it the most prestigious of all the Legislative Assembly Constituencies of Assam.

This constituency was abolished in 2023.

== Members of Legislative Assembly ==
Year	Name	Party
1967	Mahendra Mohan Choudhry	Indian National Congress
1972	Atul Chandrasaikia	Indian National Congress
1978	Ajoy Kumar Dutta	Janata Party
1983	Munin Sarmah	Indian National Congress
1985	Biraj Kumar Sarma	Independent
1991	Chitta Ranjan Patowari	Indian National Congress
1996	Biraj Kumar Sarma	Asom Gana Parishad
2001	Pankaj Bora	Indian National Congress
2006	Robin Bordoloi	Indian National Congress
2011	Robin Bordoloi	Indian National Congress
2016	Siddhartha Bhattacharya	Bharatiya Janata Party
2021	Siddhartha Bhattacharya	Bharatiya Janata Party
Constituency abolished

== Election results ==
=== 2016 ===
2016 Assam Legislative Assembly election: Gauhati East
Party	Candidate	Votes	%	±%
BJP	Siddhartha Bhattacharya	127,602	78.49	+44.20
INC	Bobbeeta Sharma	30,965	19.05	−18.38
NOTA	None of the Above	1,288	0.79	
Majority		96,637	59.44	+56.30
Turnout		1,62,579	75.09	
Registered electors		2,16,521		
BJP gain from INC		Swing	+12.93	

=== 2011 ===
2011 Assam Legislative Assembly election: Gauhati East
Party	Candidate	Votes	%	±%
INC	Captain Robin Bordoloi	47,727	37.44	
BJP	Siddhartha Bhattacharya	43,730	34.30	
AGP	Queen Oja	29,644	23.25	
CPI	Upendra Nath Talukdar	1,795	1.41	
AITC	Kailash Kanta Sarma	1,318	1.03	
NCP	Dhiren Deb Adhikari	794	0.62	
Independent	Bhupen Sarma	607	0.48	
Independent	Tutu Sarkar	505	0.40	
Independent	Kaji Nekib Ahmed	419	0.33	
Independent	Bhupen Boro	353	0.28	
SP	Umesh Chandra Das	322	0.25	
Independent	Jayanta Kumar Barua	261	0.20	
Majority		3,997	3.14	
Turnout		1,27,475	61.08	
INC hold		Swing		

== See also ==
- Gauhati
- List of constituencies of Assam Legislative Assembly
