= Suzam Uddin Laskar =

Indian politician

Suzam Uddin Laskar is an All India United Democratic Front politician from Assam, India. He has been elected in Assam Legislative Assembly election in 2016 from Katlicherra constituency defeating the heavyweight Congress leader Gautam Roy. In the 2021 election, Suzam Uddin Laskar again won in the Katlicherra constituency.
