= Dwarika Nath Tewari =

Indian politician

Member of the Assam Legislative Assembly
- In office 1962–1967
- Preceded by: Tazamulali Barlaskar
- Succeeded by: Jagannath Sinha
- Constituency: Udharbond

Personal details
- Party: Indian National Congress

Dwarika Nath Tewari is an Indian politician and former MLA from Assam. He was elected to the Assam Legislative Assembly from Udharbond constituency in the 1962 election as a member of the Indian National Congress.
