= Asif Mohammad Nazar =

Indian politician

Member of Assam Legislative Assembly
- Incumbent
- Assumed office 21 May 2021
- Preceded by: Dr. Nazrul Islam
- Constituency: Laharighat

Personal details
- Born: Asif Mohammad Nazar; 1988 (age 37–38) Ulubari Morigaon, Assam, India
- Party: Indian National Congress
- Spouse: Dr. Sabnam Jesmina
- Parents: Dr. Nazrul Islam (father); Aziza Nazrul (mother)
- Education: Al-Ameen Medical College, (MBBS); Vydehi Institute of Medical Sciences and Research Centre, (MD)
- Profession: Physician, politician, Social Worker

Asif Mohammad Nazar is an Indian politician from Assam. He was elected to the Assam Legislative Assembly from the Laharighat Assembly constituency in Morigaon district representing the Indian National Congress.

He won the winning the 2021 Assam Legislative Assembly election from Laharighat on Congress ticket. He delivered a provocative speech during a campaign meeting in Bhuragaon on 1 April 2024 following which an FIR was registered against him by a local leader at Bhuragaon police station.
