= Zubair Anam Mazumder =

Indian politician

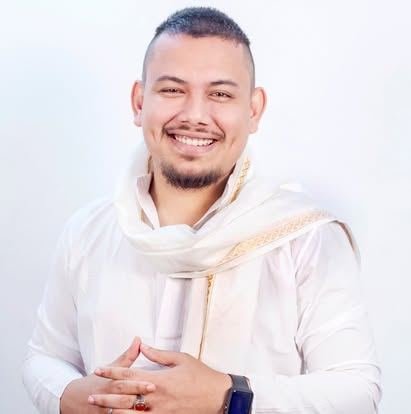

Member of Assam Legislative Assembly
- Incumbent
- Assumed office 2026
- Constituency: Algapur-Katlicherra

President, Assam Pradesh Youth Congress
- Incumbent
- Assumed office 2023 - 2026

Personal details
- Born: Assam, India
- Party: Indian National Congress
- Education: Bachelor of Architecture, Guwahati College of Architecture

Zubair Anam Mazumder (born 1991) is an Indian politician from the northeastern state of Assam. He is a member of the Assam Legislative Assembly from the Algapur–Katlicherra Assembly constituency in Hailakandi district representing the Indian National Congress. He is also serving as the National General Secretary of Indian Youth Congress and overseeing the Arunachal Pradesh Youth Congress committee.

== Early life ==
Mazumder is from Algapur–Katlicherra, Hailakandi district, Assam. He is the son of Khairul Anam Mazumder. He did BArch in 2019, at Guwahati College of Architecture, which is affiliated with Gauhati University. He is a businessman and declared assets worth Rs.11 lakhs in his affidavit to the Election Commission of India.

== Career ==
Mazumder is the president of the Assam Pradesh Youth Congress. In April 2023, he defeated Paritosh Roy in the internal elections of the Congress party. Earlier, he held the post of the State General Secretary. In May 2026, he became an MLA for the first time winning the Algapur–Katlicherra Assembly constituency representing the Indian National Congress in the 2026 Assam Legislative Assembly election. He polled 1,45,661 votes and defeated his nearest rival, Zakir Hussain Laskar of the Asom Gana Parishad, by a margin of 1,05,448 votes.
