= Gourishankar Roy =

Indian politician

Member of the Assam Legislative Assembly
- In office 1951–1967
- Preceded by: New constituency
- Succeeded by: Tajamul Ali Laskar
- Constituency: Katlicherra
- In office 1978–1983
- Preceded by: Santosh Kumar Roy
- Succeeded by: Tajamul Ali Laskar
- Constituency: Katlicherra

Personal details
- Party: Indian National Congress

Gourishankar Roy is an Indian politician from Assam. He was elected to the Assam Legislative Assembly from Katlicherra constituency in the 1952, 1957, 1962 and 1978 Assam Legislative Assembly election as a member of the Indian National Congress.
