= Tazamulali Barlaskar =

Indian politician

Tazamul Ali Barlaskar

Member of the Assam Legislative Assembly
- In office 1957–1962
- Preceded by: New constituency
- Succeeded by: Dwarika Nath Tewari
- Constituency: Udharbond

Personal details
- Born: Koroikhandi (Durganagar Part III)
- Party: Indian National Congress

Tazamul Ali Barlaskar is an Indian politician and former MLA from Assam. He was elected to the Assam Legislative Assembly from Udharbond constituency in the 1957 election as a member of the Indian National Congress.
