= Gobinda Chandra Basumatary =

Indian politician

Member of Legislative Assembly Udalguri
- Incumbent
- Assumed office 2021
- Constituency: Udalguri

Personal details
- Born: Assam
- Party: United People's Party Liberal
- Education: Global Open University, Nagaland
- Occupation: Politician

Gobinda Chandra Basumatary is a United People's Party Liberal politician from the Indian state of Assam. He has been elected to the Assam Legislative Assembly from Udalguri constituency in the 2021 election.

== Early life ==
He is the son of Late Khanda Basumatari and resides in Angrajulli village in Udalguri district. He earned his Master's degree from Global Open University, Dimapur, Nagaland in 2015. His wife, Pranima Narzari, is a government employee.

== Political career ==
He won the Bhairabkunda constituency in the 2020 Bodoland Territorial Council election and became the Deputy Chief Executive Member of Bodoland Territorial Region, an autonomous administrative division in Assam. In 2021, he won the Udalguri Assembly seat by a margin of 24,374 votes, against three-time MLA Rihon Daimari.
