= Tajamul Ali Laskar =

Indian politician

Member of the Assam Legislative Assembly
- In office 1967–1972
- Preceded by: Gourishankar Roy
- Succeeded by: Santosh Kumar Roy
- Constituency: Katlicherra
- In office 1983–1985
- Preceded by: Gourishankar Roy
- Succeeded by: Gautam Roy
- Constituency: Katlicherra

Personal details
- Party: Indian National Congress

Tajamul Ali Laskar is an Indian politician and former lawmaker. He was elected to the Assam Legislative Assembly from Katlicherra constituency in the 1967 and 1983 Assam Legislative Assembly election as an Independent candidate.
