= Rahul Roy (politician) =

Indian politician

Member of Assam Legislative Assembly
- In office 2006 - 2011
- Preceded by: Sahidul Alam Choudhury
- Succeeded by: Sahidul Alam Choudhury
- Constituency: Algapur

Personal details
- Parent(s): Gautam Roy (Father); Mandira Roy (Mother)
- Relatives: Santosh Kumar Roy (grandfather)

Rahul Roy is an Indian politician from the state of Assam. He is a former member of Assam Legislative Assembly for Algapur, serving from 2006 to 2011. He is a former member of Indian National Congress, but is currently independent. He unsuccessfully sought reelection in Algapur in 2011, and in 2016. In 2021, he unsuccessfully sought election for the Udharbond constituency, where he was richest of all the contesting candidates. He is the son of former minister Gautam Roy, and former member of Assam Legislative Assembly Mandira Roy, grandson of former member of Assam Legislative Assembly Santosh Kumar Roy and is married to Daisy Roy, who was an independent candidate for the Algapur seat in 2021.
