= BPF =

BPF may refer to:

== Organisations ==
- Badminton Players Federation, an independent organisation of badminton
- Banco Português de Fomento, a Portuguese state-owned development bank headquartered in Porto
- Belarusian Popular Front, a political party
- Belize People's Front, a political party
- Bodoland People's Front, a political party
- Botswana Patriotic Front, a political party
- British Plastics Federation, a UK trade association
- British Polio Fellowship, a medical research charity
- British Property Federation, a membership organisation
- Buddhist Peace Fellowship, a nonsectarian international network
- Business and Professionals Federation of Hong Kong, a think tank

== Science and technology ==
- Band-pass filter, a device that passes frequencies within a certain range
- Berkeley Packet Filter, a mechanism to write/read packets to/from network interface
  - eBPF, an extended version used to run sandboxed programs in the operating system
- Bisphenol F, a synthetic compound used in the manufacture of certain plastics

=== Medicine ===
- Brazilian purpuric fever, an illness in children
- Bronchopleural fistula, a disease of the lungs
- Bradykinin-potentiating factor, of the inflammatory mediator bradykinin

== Other uses ==
- British Pacific Fleet, a Royal Navy fleet of World War II
- Batting park factor, a baseball statistic
- Batuna Airport (IATA code), Solomon Islands; see List of airports by IATA code
- Brighton Photo Fringe, running in parallel with the Brighton Photo Biennial, UK
