= Ajoy Kumar Dutta =

Indian social worker

- Born: Assam, India
- Occupation: Social worker
- Known for: Social service
- Awards: Padma Shri

Ajoy Kumar Dutta is an Indian social worker from the northeastern Indian state of Assam. He is a Guwahati-based activist associated with several non governmental organizations working in the state. A former municipal councillor at the Guwahati Municipal Corporation, he successfully contested the Assam Legislative Assembly elections of 1978 as a Janata Party candidate defeating Nandeshwar Talukdar of the Communist Party of India by polling close to 34 percent of the total votes polled, and represented the Guwahati East constituency in the Assembly. In 2016, the Government of India awarded him the Padma Shri, the country's fourth highest civilian honour, for his contributions to society.
