= Laharighat Assembly constituency =

Assembly constituency of Assam

Laharighat
- Constituency No. 53 for the Assam Legislative Assembly

Constituency details
- Country: India
- Region: Northeast India
- State: Assam
- District: Morigaon
- Lok Sabha constituency: Nagaon
- Established: 1951
- Reservation: None

Member of Legislative Assembly
- 16th Assam Legislative Assembly
- Incumbent Asif Mohammad Nazar
- Party: Indian National Congress
- Elected year: 2026

Laharighat Assembly constituency is one of the 126 assembly constituencies of Assam Legislative Assembly. Laharighat is part of the Nagaon Lok Sabha constituency.

== Members of the Legislative Assembly ==
S.No	Year	Name of MLA	Party
1	1951	Mohammed Rofique	Independent
2	1952	By-election: Nurul Islam	Indian National Congress
3	1957	Motiram Bora	Indian National Congress
4	1957	Dhirsingh Deori	Indian National Congress
5	1962	Lakshmi Prasad Goswami	Praja Socialist Party
6	1967	Abul Kashem	Indian National Congress
7	1972	Abul Kashem	Indian National Congress
8	1978	Abul Kashem	Indian National Congress
9	1985	Abdul Jalil	Indian National Congress
10	1991	Samsul Huda	Indian National Congress
11	1996	Dr. Nazrul Islam	Indian National Congress
12	2001	Dr. Nazrul Islam	Indian National Congress
13	2006	Dr. Nazrul Islam	Indian National Congress
14	2011	Dr. Nazrul Islam	Indian National Congress
15	2016	Dr. Nazrul Islam	Indian National Congress
16	2021	Asif Mohammad Nazar	Indian National Congress
17	2026	Asif Mohammad Nazar	Indian National Congress

== Election results ==
=== 2026 ===
2026 Assam Legislative Assembly election: Laharighat
Party	Candidate	Votes	%	±%
INC	Asif Mohammad Nazar	169,212	57.78	+20.48
AIUDF	Siddique Ahmed	1,02,917	35.14	−0.92
AGP	Md. Kholilur Rahman	16,342	5.58	New
NOTA	NOTA	1,679	0.57	−0.09
Margin of victory		66,295	22.64	+21.40
Turnout		2,92,863		
Rejected ballots				
Registered electors				
INC hold		Swing		

=== 2021 ===
2021 Assam Legislative Assembly election: Laharighat
Party	Candidate	Votes	%	±%
INC	Asif Mohammad Nazar	60,782	37.3	−4.10
Independent	Siddique Ahmed	58,739	36.06	−1.19
BJP	Kadiruzzaman Zinnah	34,553	21.26	+2.89
NOTA	None Of The Above	1,068	0.66	0
Margin of victory		2,028	1.24	−2.91
Turnout		1,63,369	87.5	+0.47
Registered electors		1,86,704		
INC hold		Swing		

=== 2016 ===
2016 Assam Legislative Assembly election: Laharighat
Party	Candidate	Votes	%	±%
INC	Dr. Nazrul Islam	57,904	41.4	
AIUDF	Siddique Ahmed	52,098	37.25	
BJP	Jadumoni Patar	25,692	18.37	
NOTA	None Of The Above	930	0.66	
Majority		5,806	4.15	
Turnout		1,39,870	87.03	
Registered electors		1,60,723		
INC hold		Swing		

=== 1952 by-election ===
1952 by-elections: Laharighat
Party	Candidate	Votes	%	±%
INC	Nurul Islam	12,520		
Independent	M. Abu Shama	1,736		
Independent	S..M. Abbas	728		
Margin of victory		10,784		
Turnout				
INC gain from Independent		Swing		

== See also ==
- List of constituencies of Assam Legislative Assembly
