= Lakhipur Assembly constituency =

Assembly constituency of Assam

Lakhipur
- Constituency No. 114 for the Assam Legislative Assembly

Constituency details
- Country: India
- Region: Northeast India
- State: Assam
- Division: Barak Valley
- District: Cachar
- Lok Sabha constituency: Silchar
- Established: 1951
- Reservation: None

Lakhipur Assembly constituency is one of the 126 state legislative assembly constituencies in Assam state in North Eastern India. It is also part of the Silchar Lok Sabha constituency.

== Members of the Legislative Assembly ==
Election	Member	Political Party	Tenure
2021	Kaushik Rai	Bharatiya Janata Party	2021-Incumbent
2016	Rajdeep Goala	INC	2014-21
2014	Rajdeep Goala	INC	2014-21
2011	Dinesh Prasad Goala	INC	1983-14
2006	Dinesh Prasad Goala	INC	1983-14
2001	Dinesh Prasad Goala	INC	1983-14
1996	Dinesh Prasad Goala	INC	1983-14
1991	Dinesh Prasad Goala	INC	1983-14
1985	Dinesh Prasad Goala	INC	1983-14
1983	Dinesh Prasad Goala	IND	1983-14
1978	Kazi Kutubuddin Ahmed	IND	1978-83
1967	Mera Chouba Singha	INC	1967-78
1962	Ram Prasad Choubey	INC	1957-67
1957	Ram Prasad Choubey	INC	1957-67
1952	Raghunandan Dhubi	INC	1952-57
1952	Ram Prasad Choubey	INC	1952-57

== Election results ==
=== 2026 ===
2026 Assam Legislative Assembly election: Lakhipur
Party	Candidate	Votes	%	±%
BJP	Kaushik Rai	125302	81.49	
INC	Santi Kumar Singha	25901	16.84	
NOTA	NOTA	2561	1.67	
Margin of victory		99401		
Turnout		153764		
Rejected ballots				
Registered electors				
BJP hold		Swing		

=== 2021 ===
2021 Assam Legislative Assembly election: Lakhipur
Party	Candidate	Votes	%	±%
BJP	Kaushik Rai	55,341	44.61%	+11.83
INC	Mukesh Pandey	42,641	34.38%	−20.74
Independent	Thoiba Singha	20,503	16.53%	N/A
AJP	Alimuddin Mazumder	2,991	2.41%	N/A
NOTA	None of the above	1,536	1.24%	+0.04
Margin of victory		12,700	10.37%	−11.96
Turnout		122,510	74.03%	−2.13
BJP gain from INC		Swing	+11.83	

=== 2016 ===
Assam Legislative Assembly Election, 2016: Lakhipur
Party	Candidate	Votes	%	±%
INC	Rajdeep Goala	60,135	55.12	
BJP	Thoiba Singha	35,768	32.78	
JD(U)	Lalthomlien Hmar	8,923	8.18	
SUCI(C)	Joy Singh Chatri	1,346	1.23	
Independent	Sanjay Kumar Thakur	741	0.68	
Independent	Ajmal Hussain Laskar	660	0.6	
Independent	Ujjal Dhubi	456	0.42	
NOTA	None of the Above	1309	1.2	
Majority		24,367	22.33	
Turnout		1,09.104	76.16	
INC hold		Swing		

=== 2014 ===
2014 By-election: Lakhipur
Party	Candidate	Votes	%	±%
INC	Rajdeep Goala	39,159	41.98	
BJP	SANJAY KUMAR THAKUR	29322	31.43	
AIUDF	Mukesh Pandey	22590	24.22	
SUCI(C)	JOY SINGH CHATRI	1640	1.76	
Independent	Nazim Uddin Mazumder	578	0.62	
NOTA	None of the Above	1070	1.15	
Majority		9837	10.54	
Turnout		93289	67.89	
INC hold		Swing		

== See also ==
- Cachar district
- Lakhipur
