= Ashraful Hussain =

Indian politician (born 1994)

Member of the Assam Legislative Assembly
- Incumbent
- Assumed office May 21, 2021
- Preceded by: Sukur Ali Ahmed
- Constituency: Chenga

Personal details
- Born: 10 January 1994 (age 32) Haripur, Barpeta District, Assam
- Party: All India United Democratic Front
- Education: Indira Gandhi National Open University
- Profession: Politician, Journalist, Social Worker, Poet

Ashraful Hussain (born 10 January 1994) is an Indian politician and social worker from Assam. He is a member of the All India United Democratic Front (AIUDF) and represents the Chenga Assembly constituency in the Assam Legislative Assembly. He was first elected in the 2021 Assam Legislative Assembly election.

== Early life and education ==
Hussain was born in Haripur village in Barpeta district to a Muslim family.

He completed his secondary education at Tarabari Higher Secondary School and senior secondary education at Ratnadip Junior College. He earned a diploma in Junior Engineering from the CIPET, Guwahati, and later obtained a bachelor's degree in Social Work from the Indira Gandhi National Open University.

== Career ==
Before entering politics, Hussain worked in the private sector in Pune from 2014 to 2016 and as a freelance journalist for regional publications.

He participated in several civil society initiatives, including the Karwan-e-Mohabbat campaign founded by Harsh Mander and the Sambidhan Sevak programme aimed at promoting awareness of the Constitution of India.

During floods and the COVID-19 lockdown, he took part in relief activities in flood-affected villages of Assam.

== Political career ==
Hussain contested the 2021 Assam Legislative Assembly election as a candidate of the All India United Democratic Front from the Chenga seat. He defeated the incumbent Sukur Ali Ahmed of the Indian National Congress, receiving 75,312 votes (58.83%).

Since his election, he has served as a member of the 15th Assam Legislative Assembly.

== Legal matters ==
According to his 2021 election affidavit, Hussain has faced legal proceedings.

In July 2019, he was among several writers charged with “promoting enmity” following publication of a poem by Hafiz Ahmed; the accused were granted anticipatory bail the same month.

In February 2023, police filed a case linking him to an alleged kidnapping incident; Hussain denied any involvement, and the investigation was pending as of 2025.

== Personal life ==
On 27 May 2021, Hussain married Rehna Sultana, an assistant professor at Sibsagar Girls' College.
