= Mihir Kanti Shome =

Indian politician

Member of Assam Legislative Assembly
- Incumbent
- Assumed office 19 May 2016
- Preceded by: Ajit Singh
- Constituency: Udharbond

Personal details
- Born: 8 February 1966 (age 60) Kumbhirgram Airport, Cachar
- Party: Bharatiya Janata Party
- Spouse: Debjani Shome (m. 2012)
- Parent(s): Mohitush Shome (Father); Bakul Rani Shome (Mother)
- Occupation: politician

Mihir Kanti Shome is a Bharatiya Janata Party politician from Assam, India. He has been elected in Assam Legislative Assembly election in 2016 from Udharbond constituency. He currently resides in Kumbhirgram. His father was a well known social worker of the area.
