= Chenga Assembly constituency =

Assembly constituency of Assam

Chenga
- Constituency No. 23 for the Assam Legislative Assembly

Constituency details
- Country: India
- Region: Northeast India
- State: Assam
- District: Barpeta
- Lok Sabha constituency: Dhubri Lok Sabha constituency
- Established: 1967
- Reservation: None

Member of Legislative Assembly
- 16th Assam Legislative Assembly
- Incumbent Ashraful Hussain
- Party: All India United Democratic Front
- Elected year: 2021

Chenga Assembly constituency is one of the 126 assembly constituencies of Assam Legislative Assembly. Chenga forms part of the Dhubri Lok Sabha constituency.

== Town details ==
Following are details on Chenga Assembly constituency (since 2023):

- Country: India.
- State: Assam.
- District: Barpeta district.
- Lok Sabha Constituency: Barpeta Lok Sabha constituency.
- Area Includes: Chenga Dev. Block(Part), Barpeta Dev. Block(Part), Gumafulbari Dev. Block(Part), Mandia Dev. Block(Part), Sarukhetri Dev. Block(Part).

== Members of Legislative Assembly ==
Following is the list of past members representing Chenga Assembly constituency in Assam Legislature.

- 1967: A. R. Chowdhury, Indian National Congress.
- 1972: Abdul Hannan Choudhury, Indian National Congress.
- 1978: Danesh Ali Ahmed, Indian National Congress.
- 1983: Danesh Ali Ahmed, Indian National Congress.
- 1985: Mukhtar Hussain, Independent.
- 1991: Liakat Ali Khan, Independent.
- 1996: Sukur Ali Ahmed, Indian National Congress.
- 2001: Sukur Ali Ahmed, Indian National Congress.
- 2006: Liakat Ali Khan, Asom Gana Parishad.
- 2011: Sukur Ali Ahmed, Indian National Congress.
- 2016: Sukur Ali Ahmed, Indian National Congress.

Election	Name	Party
2021	Ashraful Hussain	All India United Democratic Front

== Election result ==
=== 2026 ===
2026 Assam Legislative Assembly election: Chenga
Party	Candidate	Votes	%	±%
INC	Abdul Rahim Ahmed	139167	56.85	
AIUDF	ASHRAFUL HUSSAIN	51818	21.17	
Independent	AFTADUR ALI KHAN	44021	17.98	
AGP	Saddam Hussein	5879	2.4	
NOTA	NOTA	1855	0.76	
Margin of victory		87349		
Turnout		244817		
Rejected ballots				
Registered electors				
INC gain from AIUDF		Swing		

=== 2016 ===
2016 Assam Legislative Assembly election: Chenga
Party	Candidate	Votes	%	±%
INC	Sukur Ali Ahmed	51,882	47.24	
AIUDF	Monowara Khatun	28,525	25.97	
BJP	Gunajit Adhikary	25,902	23.58	
AITC	Shafikul Hoque	2,190	1.99	
Independent	Surjya Mallique	639	0.58	
NOTA	None of the above	667	0.60	
Majority		23,357	21.27	
Turnout		1,09,805	89.62	
Registered electors		1,22,519		
INC hold		Swing		
