= Guneswar Das =

Indian politician

MLA of Raha Vidhan Sabha Constituency
- In office 2006–2011
- Preceded by: Ananda Ram Baruah
- Succeeded by: Pijush Hazarika

Personal details
- Party: All India United Democratic Front

Guneswar Das is an Indian politician from Assam. In 2011 he was elected to the Assam Legislative Assembly as the MLA for Raha (Vidhan Sabha) constituency. He is affiliated to All India United Democratic Front.
