= Kazi Kutubuddin Ahmed =

Indian politician

Member of the Assam Legislative Assembly
- In office 1978–1983
- Preceded by: M.C Singha
- Succeeded by: Dinesh Prasad Goala
- Constituency: Lakhipur

Personal details
- Party: Independent

Kazi Kutubuddin Ahmed is an Indian politician who was elected to the Assam Legislative Assembly from the Lakhipur constituency as an independent candidate in the 1978 Assam Legislative Assembly election.
