= Abdul Jalil Choudhury =

Indian Islamic scholar and politician

General Secretary of Jamiat Ulema-e-Assam
- In office 1947–1951
- Preceded by: Ibrahim Chatuli

Member of Assam Legislative Assembly
- In office 1951–1957
- Succeeded by: Bimala Prasad Chaliha
- Constituency: Badarpur
- In office 1962–1978
- Preceded by: Bimala Prasad Chaliha
- Succeeded by: Ramendra De
- Constituency: Badarpur
- In office 1980–1985
- Preceded by: Nepal Chandra Das
- Succeeded by: Sahidul Alam Chodhury
- Constituency: Algapur

Personal details
- Party: Jamiat Ulema-e-Hind; Indian National Congress

Personal life
- Born: 1925 Turkhola, Sylhet District, British Raj
- Died: 19 December 1989 (aged 63–64) Badarpur, Karimganj, India
- Education: Sylhet Government Alia Madrasah; Darul Uloom Deoband

Religious life
- Religion: Islam
- Denomination: Sunni
- Jurisprudence: Hanafi
- Movement: Deobandi

Muslim leader
- Teacher: Hussain Ahmad Madani; Shabbir Ahmad Usmani; Izaz Ali Amrohi; Muhammad Shafi; Muhammad Idris Kandhlawi

ʿAbdul Jalil Choudhury Badarpuri (Bengali: ʿআব্দুল জলিল চৌধুরী বদরপুরী, 1925 – 19 December 1989) was an Indian Deobandi Islamic scholar, teacher and politician. Born in what is now Bangladesh, Choudhury became one of the senior disciples of Hussain Ahmad Madani from Sylhet District. He relocated to Badarpur, Karimganj following the Partition of Bengal in 1947 and served as a member of the Assam Legislative Assembly for seven terms. Choudhury has many contributions in Northeast India, covering Islamic and social development, and had participated in the Bengali Language Movement of the Barak Valley.

== Early life and education ==
Abdul Jalil Choudhury was born into a Sylheti Muslim family in the village of Turukkhola in Sylhet District. His father was Muhammad Asghar Choudhury and his mother, Shamsunnessa Choudhury, was proficient in the Persian language, and initially homeschooled him in his early years before enrolling him at the local primary school.

He then proceeded to study at the local madrasa at Daudpur and subsequently at the Sylhet Government Alia Madrasah where he passed his Mamtazul Muhadditheen in 1940. He was also the general supervisor of the madrasa's students' union and took part in the anti-colonial independence movement for which he was once imprisoned. He then migrated to Hindustan to study at the Darul Uloom Deoband institution in Saharanpur. He was to graduate from the Faculty of Hadith in 1942, but as a result of partaking in Hussain Ahmad Madani's rebellions as a student leader, was arrested once again. In 1952, he finally graduated from Deoband in Hadith studies. Among his teachers were Hussain Ahmed Madani, Shabbir Ahmad Usmani, Izaz Ali Amrohi, Muhammad Shafi and Muhammad Idris Kandhlawi.

== Career ==
Choudhury's career began in Sylhet Government High School as teacher of the Persian language. Two years later, he was appointed the principal of Jessore Alia Madrasa and then as a teacher at Ajiria Madrasa in Fulbari.

Choudhury's activism began in his student life, and he was associated with the Jamiat Ulema-e-Hind sought for independence from the British Raj while opposing the Partition of India. His biographers mention that Muslim League politicians conspired against him and other influential Jamiat supporters, and thus Choudhury requested Jamiat members in Assam to help him migrate to the Indian dominion. The Assam Jamiat politicians solicited his citizenship to Gopinath Bordoloi, the erstwhile Chief Minister of Assam, who personally sent a letter to Choudhury inviting him to Assam. As soon as Choudhury received the letter in September 1947, he settled in the village of Alaqulipur in Karimganj, leaving his parents, siblings and spouse.

In October 1947, Choudhury was appointed the principal of Deorail Senior Madrasa, under the instruction of its founder Shah Yaqub Badarpuri. During his term, the madrasa was remodelled upon Deobandi standards and gained official recognition from the Government of Assam in 1948. The Department of Hadith studies was inaugurated on 24 February 1954 by Hussain Ahmad Madani, and Choudhury served as the head of this department until his death. He was also the founder of North East India Emarat-e-Saraiah and Nadwatut Tameer, a Muslim religious organisation for overall development.

=== Political career ===
In 1951, he joined the Indian National Congress and was an elected member of the Assam Legislative Assembly for 27 years in total. Initially representing the Badarpur constituency, he served his final term in the Algapur constituency. During the Bengali Language Movement of the Barak Valley in 1961, he publicly advocated for the movement, considering it to be an obligation for all Bengalis.

== Personal life ==
Choudhury divorced his wife as she was not willing to migrate with him to Assam after the Partition of India in 1947.

== See also ==
- List of Deobandis
