= Badminton Players Federation =

Official logo

The Badminton Players Federation (BPF) is an independent organisation of badminton which was founded in 1972 by Danish World Champion Steen Fladberg with the mission of creating a more profitable structure in the badminton arena, to make the sport more enjoyable and to promote badminton.

The BPF membership includes players from 46 nations and the current state office is in Copenhagen, Denmark.

The organisation was established to:

- create a professional tour for top badminton players so that they could play professionally,
- increase the awareness of the sport and to voice the opinions of players,
- maintain the standard of badminton.
