= Biraj Kumar Sarma =

Indian politician (1948–2019)

Biraj Kumar Sarma was an Asom Gana Parishad politician from Assam. He was born 1948. He was popularly referred to as " the people's leader".[6]

Sarma was one of three representatives of the Assam Agitation against illegal immigrants (1979–85) who signed the Assam Accord in presence of former Prime Minister Rajiv Gandhi. He was the general secretary of the All Assam Gana Sangram Parishad (AAGSP) while the other two signatories — Prafulla Kumar Mahanta and Bhrigu Kumar Phukan — were leaders of the All Assam Students’ Union (AASU).[5] He was a front ranking leader of the six-year-long Assam Movement led by the All Assam Students Union from 1979 which had culminated in the signing of the Memorandum of Settlement (MoS) Assam Accord in 1985 between AASU and representatives of central and Assam governments.

Sarma had participated in the Assam Movement as an active member of Sadou Asom Gana Sangram Parishad and co-founded Asom Gana Parishad (AGP), which was formed by the Assam agitation leaders in 1985. He was the general secretary of the party and later its vice-president.

He remained with the AGP from its formation till his death and had represented Gauhati East assembly constituency twice.

He had survived a gun attack on him by the proscribed United Liberation Front of Assam (ULFA) in 1998.[7] He was elected in Assam Legislative Assembly election in 1985 and 1996 from Gauhati East constituency. [5][6]

He died on 15 January 2019 at the age of 70. At the time of death he was the adviser to the UNESCO Associations, Guwahati, president to the UNA, Assam and the vice president of the Assam Gana Parishad.
