= Dimbeswar Das =

Indian politician

Dimbeswar Das is a Bharatiya Janata Party politician from Assam. He has been elected in Assam Legislative Assembly election in 2016 from Raha constituency.

On 19 January 2017, Das' car was removed by an engineer in Nagaon district for blocking the road to an office. A video-clip showed the minister berating the engineer, who then touched Das’ feet to apologize for the incident. However, Das denied that the engineer had touched his feet by way of an apology.
