= Mukunda Ram Choudhury =

Indian politician

Mukunda Ram Choudhary (born 1 April 1949) is an Indian politician who was the member of the 13th Assam Legislative Assembly for Kalaigaon Assembly constituency (no. 65) in Udalguri district of Assam, from 2011 to 2016.
