= Ram Prasad Choubey =

Indian politician

Member of the Assam Legislative Assembly
- In office 1952–1967
- Preceded by: New constituency
- Succeeded by: Mera Chouba Singha
- Constituency: Lakhipur

Personal details
- Party: Indian National Congress

Ram Prasad Choubey is an Indian politician and former MLA from Assam. He was elected to the Assam Legislative Assembly from Lakhipur constituency in the 1952, 1957 and 1962 elections as a member of the Indian National Congress.
