= Dinesh Prasad Goala =

Indian politician (1947–2014)

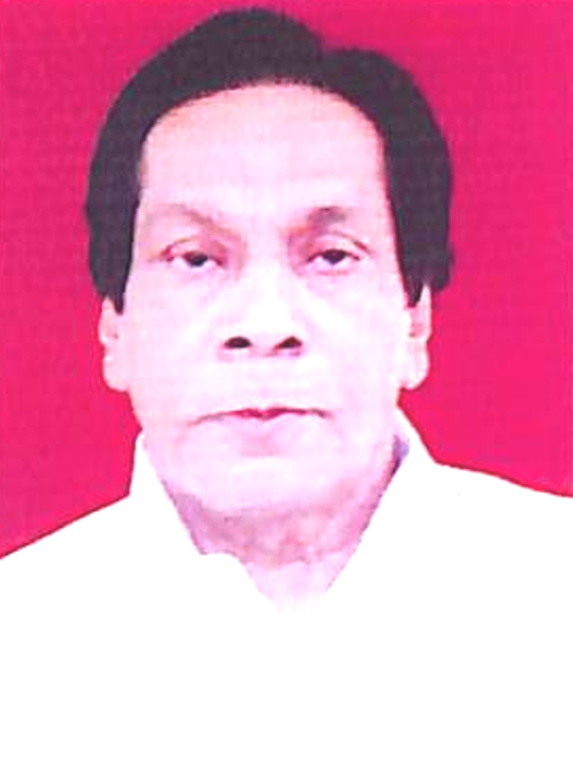
- Official portrait

Cabinet Minister, Assam
- In office 21 May 2006 – 18 May 2011
- Chief Minister: Tarun Gogoi
- Portfolio: Urban Development and Housing
- Preceded by: Hemprakash Narayan
- Succeeded by: Ajanta Neog
- In office 17 May 2001 – 21 May 2006
- Chief Minister: Tarun Gogoi
- Portfolios: Public Health Engineering; Judicial, Legislative and Law
- Succeeded by: Rihon Daimary (PHE); Pranab Gogoi (Law)
- In office 30 June 1991 – 22 April 1996
- Chief Minister: Hiteswar Saikia
- Portfolios: Power (until Oct'1991); Public Health Engineering (from Oct'1991)

Member, Assam Legislative Assembly
- In office 1983 – 11 April 2014
- Preceded by: Kazi Kutubuddin Ahmed
- Succeeded by: Rajdeep Goala
- Constituency: Lakhipur

Personal details
- Born: 1 July 1947 Dugrubasti, Assam, India
- Died: 11 April 2014 (aged 66) Gurgaon
- Party: Indian National Congress
- Spouse: Moni Goala
- Children: 3, including Rajdeep, Deepmala, and Jaydeep
- Parents: Late Lal Behari Goala (father); Late Lasminia Goala (mother)
- Education: Gauhati University (MA)
- Occupation: Politician

Dinesh Prasad Goala (1 July 1947 – 11 April 2014) was an Indian politician and a former MLA from Lakhipur, representing INC for 7 consecutive terms (1983–2014) until his death. He also served as the Minister in-charge of the Power & Public Health Engineering Department of Assam from 1991 to 2006. Dinesh died at a hospital on 11 April 2014, aged 66. He had been suffering from cardiac health issues. He lived in Binnakandi Ghat.

== Education ==
Goala earned his MA in Political Science from Gauhati University in 1971.
