= Gaurishankar Bhattacharyya =

Assamese freedom fighter

Gauri Shankar Bhattacharyya (10 December 1915 – 23 June 2002?) was an Assamese freedom fighter, social activist, litterateur and politician, who served as the Leader of Opposition in the Assam Legislative Assembly.

== Early life and education ==
Bhattacharya was born in Samarkuchi village of Nalbari district to Souridutta Bhattacharyya, a Sanskrit Pandit. He did his undergraduate from Cotton College, and earned an M. A. in history from Presidency College, Kolkata.

== Political career ==
Bhattacharya was active in politics since his student days; in 1939, he was elected as the president of the All Assam Students Federation.

In 1952, Bhattacharya won election to the Assam Legislative Assembly from the Guwahati constituency for the Communist Party of India (CPI) defeating Rajabala Das of the Indian National Congress (INC). (Note: Only 44.41% of the electorate voted in the polls. Bhattacharya secured 5505 votes, winning by a margin of 213.) In 1957, he defended the seat, defeating Lakshmidhar Borah of the INC. (Note: Only 52.08% of the electorate voted in the polls. Bhattacharya secured 14,182 votes, winning by a margin of 973.) However, five years later in 1962, Bhattacharya suffered defeat at the hands of Debendra Nath Sharma, the INC candidate. (Note: Only 58.39% of the electorate voted in the polls. Bhattacharya secured 8560 votes, losing by a margin of 5487.) Months afterward, during the Sino-Indian War, Bhattacharya was subject to preventive detention by the Congress government for his activism; he would leave CPI, shortly.

In the 1967 elections, Bhattacharya stood as an independent candidate from the newly delimited Borbhag constituency and won over Pabindra Nath Sarma of the INC. (Note: Only 46.4% of the electorate voted in the polls. Bhattacharya secured 14,772 votes, winning by a margin of 4346.) Two years later, Bhattacharya collaborated with Renuka Devi Barkataki, a Congress renegade, to launch the Peoples Democratic Party of Assam (PDPA); (Note: Not to be confused with Hill State People's Democratic Party, formed in Assam around the same time.) it would be the first regional party to contest the assembly elections. Five years later, Bhattacharya stood as an independent candidate from Borbhag again, and won against Sarma. (Note: Only 52.8% of the electorate voted in the polls. Bhattacharya secured 14,772 votes, winning by a margin of 629.) Bhattacharya became the leader of the Opposition in the Assam Legislative Assembly. The Peoples democratic Party (PDPA) later merged with Janata Party in 1977.

== Literature ==
Bhattacharya moved away from politics in his later life, devoting time to literature; in 1999, he was conferred with the national Sahitya Academy Award (Anubad Suchi Samman) by the Sahitya Akademi for translating B.R. Aggarwalla's Trials of Independence into Assamese.

== Personal life ==
Gauri Shankar Bhattacharya married Tarulata Bhattacharya; they had three sons and three daughters.
