= Jagannath Singh (Assam politician) =

Indian politician

Member of the Assam Legislative Assembly
- In office 1978–1985
- Preceded by: Jagannath Sinha
- Succeeded by: Joy Prakash Tewari
- Constituency: Udharbond
- In office 1991–1996
- Preceded by: Joy Prakash Tewari
- Succeeded by: Jagannath Sinha
- Constituency: Udharbond

Personal details
- Party: Indian National Congress

Jagannath Singh is an Indian politician from Assam who is affiliated with the Indian National Congress. He was elected to the Assam Legislative Assembly from Udharbond constituency in the 1978, 1983 and 1991 Assam Legislative Assembly election.
