= Rekha Rani Das Boro =

Indian politician

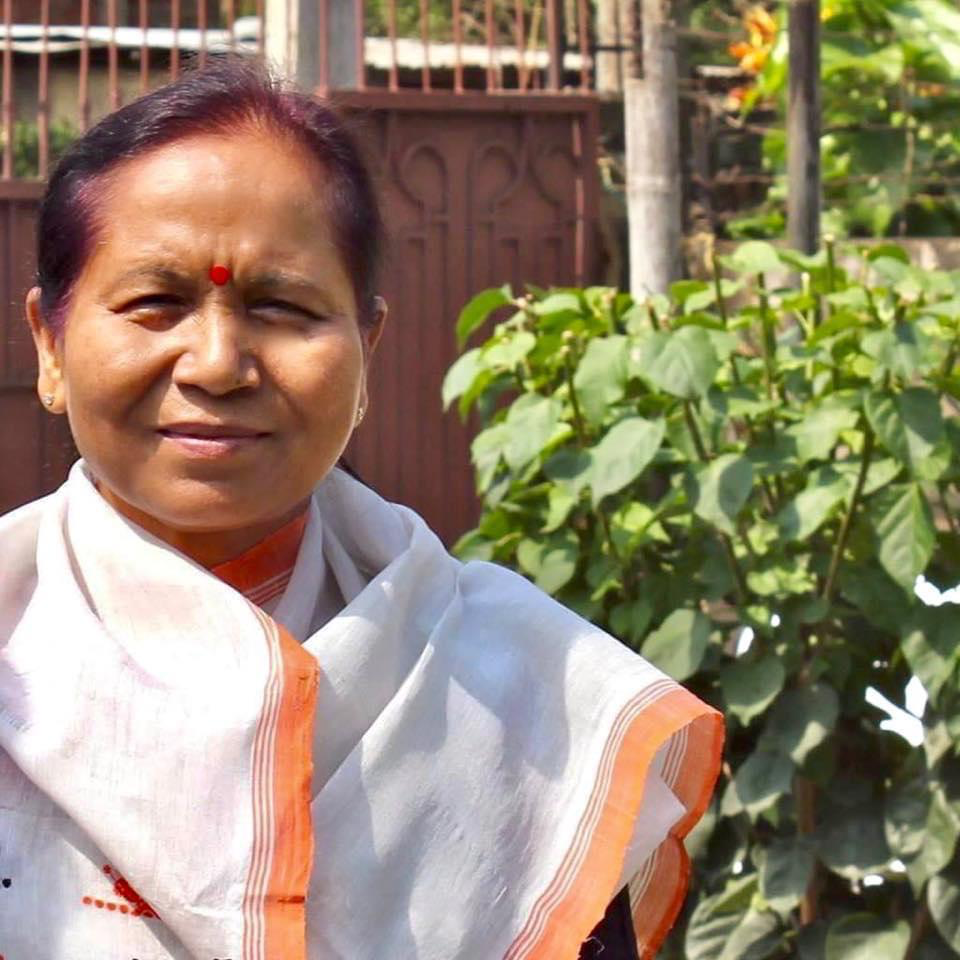

Member of Legislative Assembly for Barama Constituency
- In office 1985–1990
- In office 1996–2001

Minister of State for Social Welfare and Sericulture and Weaving
- In office 1985–1990

Minister of Welfare of Plain Tribes and Backward Classes
- In office 1996–2001

Personal details
- Born: 1960 (age 65–66)
- Party: Bharatiya Janata Party
- Spouse: Robin Deori
- Children: Upasana Deori
- Education: Master of Arts in Philosophy from Guwahati University

Rekha Rani Das Boro is a politician and former lawmaker from Assam, India. She has served as the Minister of State for Social Welfare and Sericulture and Weaving and also the Minister of Welfare of Plain Tribes and Backward Classes in the Government of Assam. Rekha Boro is the current State Vice-President of BJP Assam Pradesh. She is the daughter of freedom fighter Biren Das Boro, who was also a Member of Legislative Assembly (MLA).

== Career ==
Rekha Boro began her political career with Asom Gana Parishad (AGP) and served as a senior leader of the party. She switched to BJP in 2019. She was elected as MLA twice from Barama Constituency, in 1985 and 1996.
