= Nizam Uddin Choudhury =

Indian politician

Haji Haji Nizam Choudhury হাজী নিজাম উদ্দিন চৌধুৰী

Member of the Assam Legislative Assembly for Algapur
- Incumbent
- Assumed office 2016
- Preceded by: Mandira Roy

Personal details
- Born: Nizam Uddin Choudhury; 31-12-1972 Panchgram
- Party: All India United Democratic Front
- Spouse: Saira Begum Choudhury
- Children: 2 sons and 3 daughters.
- Parent: Late. Ishub Ali Choudhury
- Occupation: Businessmen, Politician
- Religion:Islam

Haji Nizam Uddin Choudhury is an All India United Democratic Front Party politician from Assam. He was elected to the Assam Legislative Assembly in the 2016 election from Algapur constituency LA8. He was reelected to Assam Legislative Assembly in 2021.
