= Udharbond =

- Town
- Location within Assam Location within India
- Coordinates: 24°52′11.1828″N 92°52′10.0164″E
- Country: India
- State: Assam
- District: Cachar

Population (2011)
  - Total: 9,051

Languages
  - Official: Bengali
  - Associate official language: Meitei (Manipuri)
- Time zone: UTC+5:30 (IST)
- Vehicle registration: AS 11

Udharbond is a Tehsil or Block in Cachar district in the state of Assam, India. It is located 11 km from District headquarters Silchar.

It is one of the few historical places in the entire Barak valley, a place of religious attraction and a place surrounding numerous beautiful attractive sites.

== Geography ==
Udharbond is located at 24.8668104°N 92.6872046°E.

Udharbond is situated on the bank of Madhura River, a major northern tributary of Barak River.

== Demographics ==
As per 2011 census of India, Udharbond has population of 9,051 of which 4,522 are males while 4,529 are females. The population of children aged 0-6 is 868 which is 9.59% of total population. In the Town, the female sex ratio is 1002 against state average of 958. Moreover, the child sex ratio in Udharbond town is around 955 compared to Assam state average of 962. The literacy rate of town is 92.74% higher than the state average of 72.19%. In of which male literacy is around 93.97% while the female literacy rate is 91.52%.

Bengali and Meitei (Manipuri) are the official languages of this place.

== Place of Attraction ==
=== Kachakanti Mandir ===
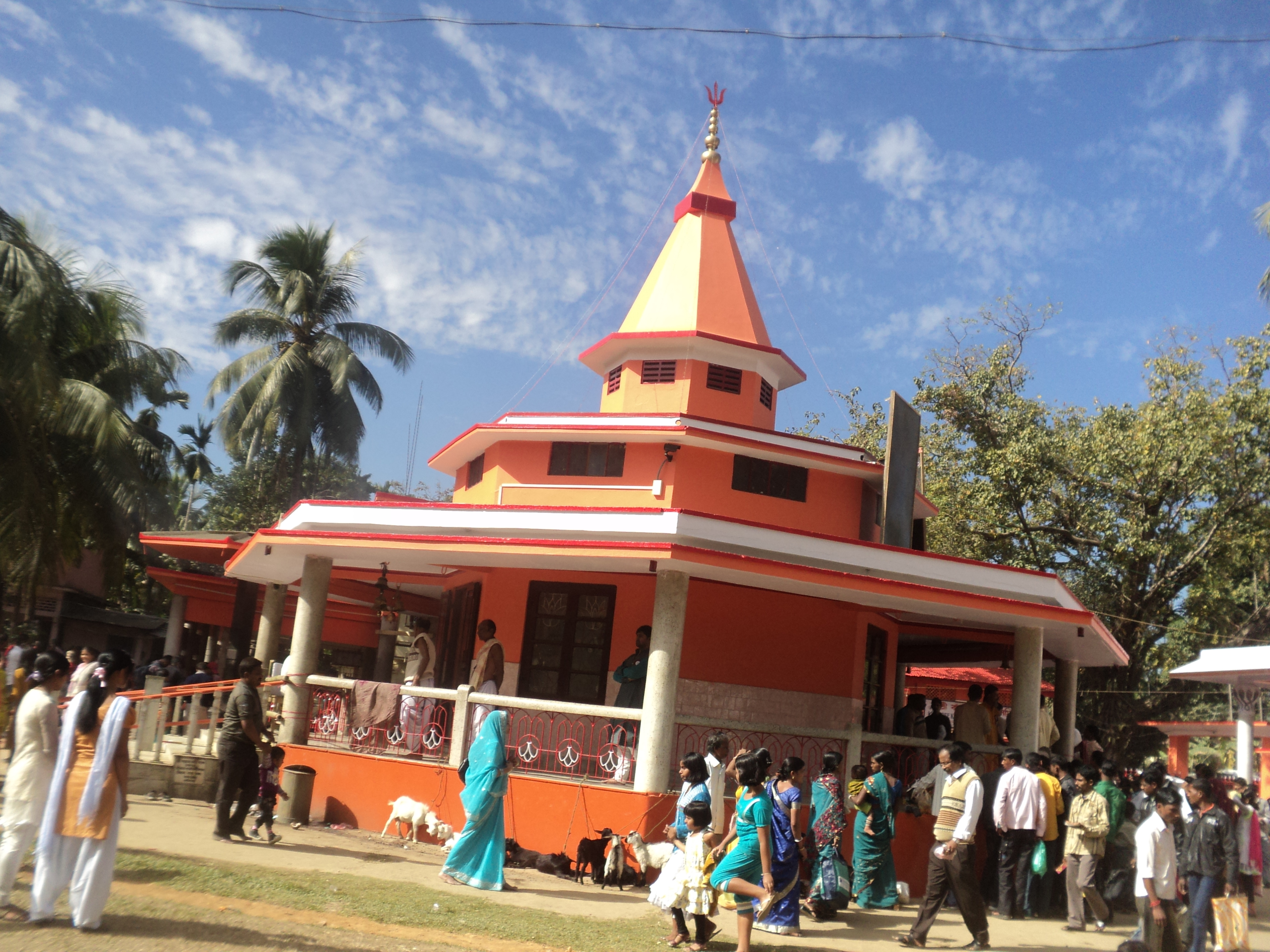
The Kachakanti Temple, Udharbond, Cachar, Assam.

Kachakanti Mandir is a Hindu temple dedicated to the Dimasa Kachari Mother Goddess "Kachakanti", one of the oldest temple of Cachar district which was established long back by the Kachari Kings and recently was remodelled and made into a beautiful structure. "Kachakanti" Devi is said to be the amalgamation of two powerful Hindu deity; Maa Durga and Maa Kali. In the early days at the time of the Kachari king, there were human sacrifices made.
During the Hindu Wedding Season many couples from poor and lower class income group get married almost on all dates of the marriage ceremonies. Moreover, almost all new vehicles purchased in the district are brought to this temple for acquiring the blessings of the goddess.

=== Khaspur Rajbari ===
Khaspur, is located in the taluk of Udharbond, Cachar district in the State of Assam which is located About 25 km away from the district headquarter Silchar. The structure is the ruin of the palace of ancient Dimasa Kachari king. The main attractions of the place are the Lion Gate, the Sun Gate and aged old kings temple. The original palace is in a state of non-existence, but its subsidiaries, the main entrance gate, the `Suryadwar`, `Debalaya` are still there intact. The entrances are of elephant-patterns.

=== Madhura ===
Situated 10 km north of Udharbond bus stand, is Madhura, a picnic destination and a marvelous place with the upper course of the blue Madhura River running rapidly between the hilly terrain. The typical landform attracts a lot of tourists. There is also a hanging bridge across Madhura River.

=== Tingtong ===
Spread among the tea gardens of Nugger, is Tingtong, a riverine stony spot, known for its majestic sunset view. This is also a famous picnic spot.

=== Rani Dighi Park ===
This is a historical large pond build during the reign of Dimassa kingdom, during their capital at Khaspur. The Pond with its banks have been decorated in the form of a park. But recently this is not well maintained by the authority.

=== Tea gardens ===
Udharbond is a town, encompassed by tea gardens. Larsing, Chandighat, Arunaband, Dayapore, Majhergram, Thaligram, Tikal, Kumbha, Kumbhirgram, Haticherra and Patimara tea estates are extremely beautiful and people in large number visit them often.

== Division ==
There is one Revenue Circle and one Development Block.

== Health facilities ==
1. Tikal Model Hospital (FRU)

2. Udharbond Block Primary Health Centre

3. Digar Kashipur MPHC

4. Rangpur MPHC

5. Thaligram MPHC

== Sports ==
=== Table Tennis Club ===
This club was Established on 2 June 1993. Primarily Focusing on the development of Table Tennis In Udharbond Region. It's also runs a Charitable Heart Care Centre.It has a Mini Indoor Sports Complex.

=== DNHS School Playground ===
A field owned by DNHS School. Football, cricket and other games are played. Some games of Assam Olympics, 2016 was also played here.

== Culture ==
Vivekananda Patmandir- Socio-cultural-spiritual organisation, working with the ideals of Swami Vivekananda. Various relied works, running free coaching centres in remote places, helping the downtrodden people with food, clothing, shelter and relief material, plantation, Swachhata Abhiyaan etc., apart from spiritual practices.

Matribhasha Aikyamancha- A cultural group associated with the Bengali programs. A statue of the 11 Language Martyrs of 1961 has been erected in front of DIET, Udharbond.

Barak Banga Sahitya Sammelan

Students' Forum

Netaji Forum

Abhishek India

- Boichitra Paribar -A social, Cultural and Literary Group. The group published a yearly Multilingual Little Magazine"Boichitra".

== Education ==
=== College ===
1. Jagannath Singh College, Udharbond.

=== Schools ===
- Durganagar Nayaram Higher Secondary (D.N.H.S) School.
- Udharbond Siksha Sadan School.
- J.C. Girls High School.
- Kachakanti Vidya Mandir.
- Ananda Marga School
- Gurukul English Academy
- Blue Bells School
- F.R. Memorial School
- J.R.D. Public School
- Joyram School
- Parimal Bala School
- Saibag School
- Practicing Govt. Senior Basic School
- Collegiate School
- Little Sprouts School Play School

== Transport ==
=== By Rail ===
There is no railway station nearby Udharbond town. However, Silchar Rail Way Station is major railway station 12 km near to Udharbond.

=== By Road ===
The national highway NH 27 passes through the town and connects this place to the states of Gujarat, Rajasthan, Madhya Pradesh, Uttar Pradesh, Bihar, West Bengal and others places of Assam.

== Banking Service ==
1. SBI, Udharbond Branch
2. PNB, Udharbond Branch.
3. Bandhan Bank, Pangram Branch
4. Assam Gramin Vikas Bank, Udharbond Branch
5. HDFC Bank, Udharbond branch

== Bank ATM Service ==
- State Bank Of India, Inside Complex, Udharbond.
- State Bank Of India, Uttarpara
- State Bank Of India, Hospital Road
- Punjab National Bank, Opposite Udharbond Police Station
- Axis Bank Near Bus Stand
- HDFC Bank Uttarpara, Udharbond

== Politics ==
Udharbond is part of Silchar (Lok Sabha constituency). It is also a part of Udharbond (Vidhan Sabha constituency).

== See also ==
- Udharbond Vidhan Sabha
