= Robin Bordoloi =

Indian politician

Minister of state for Sports & Youth Welfare, Relief and Rehabilitation
- Chief Minister: Tarun Gogoi

Member of Assam Legislative Assembly
- In office 2006 - 2016
- Preceded by: Pankaj Bora
- Succeeded by: Siddhartha Bhattacharya
- Constituency: Gauhati East
- In office 2001 - 2006
- Preceded by: Atul Bora Sr.
- Succeeded by: Atul Bora Sr.
- Constituency: Dispur

Personal details
- Born: 1 February 1942 Shillong
- Party: Bharatiya Janata Party (2016-present)
- Other political affiliations: Indian National Congress (before 2016)
- Spouse: Gita Bordoloi (m. 1969)
- Children: Ashima Bordoloi
- Parents: Gopinath Bordoloi (father); Surabala Bordoloi (mother)

Capt. Robin Bordoloi is an Indian politician and a member of the Bharatiya Janata Party. Son of Gopinath Bordoloi, he is from the State of Assam.

He was elected to Dispur constituency in 2001, winning against AGP founder and former Chief Minister of Assam Prafulla Mahanta. He was elected to the Assam Legislative Assembly in 2006 and 2011, representing the Guwahati East constituency as an Indian National Congress candidate. His daughter, Ashima, contested the 2021 Assam Legislative Assembly.
