= Udharbond Assembly constituency =

Assembly constituency of Assam

Udharbond
- Constituency No. 115 for the Assam Legislative Assembly

Constituency details
- Country: India
- Region: Northeast India
- State: Assam
- District: Cachar
- Lok Sabha constituency: Silchar
- Established: 1957
- Reservation: None

Member of Legislative Assembly
- 16th Assam Legislative Assembly
- Incumbent Rajdeep Goala
- Party: BJP
- Alliance: NDA
- Elected year: 2026

Udharbond Assembly constituency is one of the 126 state legislative assembly constituencies in Assam state in North Eastern India. It is also one of the seven state legislative assembly constituencies included in the Silchar Lok Sabha constituency.

== Members of the Legislative Assembly ==
Election	Member	Political Party	Tenure
2026	Rajdeep Goala	Bharatiya Janata Party	2026 - Incumbent
2021	Mihir Kanti Shome	Bharatiya Janata Party	2016-2026
2016	Mihir Kanti Shome	Bharatiya Janata Party	2016-2026
2011	Ajit Singh	Indian National Congress	1998-16
2006	Ajit Singh	Indian National Congress	1998-16
2001	Ajit Singh	Indian National Congress	1998-16
1998	Ajit Singh	Asom Gana Parishad	1998-16
1996	Jagannath Sinha	Indian National Congress	1996-98
1991	Jagannath Singh	Indian National Congress	1991-96
1985	Joy Prakash Tewari	Independent politician	1985-91
1983	Jagannath Singh	Indian National Congress	1978-85
1978	Jagannath Singh	Janata Party	1978-85
1972	Jagannath Sinha	Indian National Congress	1967-78
1967	Jagannath Sinha	Indian National Congress	1967-78
1962	Dwarika Nath Tewari	Indian National Congress	1962-67
1957	Tazamulali Barlaskar	Indian National Congress	1957-62

== Election results ==
=== 2026 ===
2026 Assam Legislative Assembly election: Udharbond
Party	Candidate	Votes	%	±%
NDA	Rajdeep Goala	103331	66.08	▲18.74
INC	Ajit Singh	47867	30.61	▼14.67
NOTA	NOTA	1837	1.17	▼0.91
Margin of victory		55464	35.47	▲33.39
Turnout		156372	83.27	▲4.25
Registered electors		187,789		▲45.63
BJP hold		Swing		

=== 2021 ===
2021 Assam Legislative Assembly election : Udharbond
Party	Candidate	Votes	%	±%
BJP	Mihir Kanti Shome	61,745	47.34%	−0.98
INC	Ajit Singh	59,060	45.28%	+4.63
Independent	Rahul Roy	5,796	4.44%	N/A
NOTA	None of the above	1,494	1.15%	−0.41
Margin of victory		2,685	2.08%	−5.59
Turnout		128,947	79.02%	−0.74
BJP hold		Swing	-0.98	

=== 2016 ===
Assam Legislative Assembly Election, 2016: Udharbond
Party	Candidate	Votes	%	±%
BJP	Mihir Kanti Shome	54,204	48.32	
INC	Ajit Singh	45,598	40.65	
AIUDF	Liakat Ali Laskar	8,715	7.77	
Independent	Sadik Husain Barlaskar	882	0.78	
SP	Aparna Tewari	542	0.48	
Independent	Moninul Hoque Laskar	474	0.42	
NOTA	None of the above	1,745	1.56	
Majority		8,606	7.67	
Turnout		1,12,160	79.76	
Registered electors		1,40,607		
BJP gain from INC		Swing		

== See also ==
- Udharbond
- Cachar District
