= Katlicherra Assembly constituency =

Constituency of the Assam legislative assembly in India

Coordinates: 24.46°N 92.56°E

Katlicherra
- Former constituency No. 7 for the Assam Legislative Assembly

Constituency details
- Country: India
- Region: Northeast India
- State: Assam
- District: Hailakandi
- Lok Sabha constituency: Karimganj
- Established: 1951
- Abolished: 2023
- Reservation: None

Katlicherra Assembly constituency was one of the 126 constituencies of the Legislative Assembly of Assam state in northeastern India. This constituency was abolished in 2023.

Katlicherra (constituency number 7) was one of the 3 constituencies located in Hailakandi district. Katlicherra was part of Karimganj Lok Sabha constituency.

== Members of Legislative Assembly ==
Election	Member	Party
1951	Gourishankar Roy	Indian National Congress
1957	Gourishankar Roy	Indian National Congress
1962	Gourishankar Roy	Indian National Congress
1967	Tajamul Ali Laskar	IND
1972	Santosh Kumar Roy	Indian National Congress
1978	Gourishankar Roy	Indian National Congress
1983	Tajamul Ali Laskar	Indian National Congress
1985	Gautam Roy	Indian National Congress
1991	Gautam Roy	Indian National Congress
1996	Gautam Roy	Indian National Congress
2001	Gautam Roy	Indian National Congress
2006	Gautam Roy	Indian National Congress
2011	Gautam Roy	Indian National Congress
2016	Suzam Uddin Laskar	All India United Democratic Front
2021	Suzam Uddin Laskar	All India United Democratic Front

== Election results ==
=== 2021 ===
2021 Assam Legislative Assembly election: Katlicherra
Party	Candidate	Votes	%	±%
AIUDF	Suzamuddin Laskar	79,769	51.83	
BJP	Subrata Nath	66,798	43.41	
INC	Sanjeev Roy	2,931	1.9	
NOTA	None of the above	745	0.48	
Majority		12,971		
Turnout		1,53,891	85.22%	
Registered electors		1,58,480		
AIUDF gain from		Swing		
