= Algapur–Katlicherra Assembly constituency =

Algapur–Katlicherra
- Constituency No. 122 for the Assam Legislative Assembly

Constituency details
- Country: India
- Region: Northeast India
- State: Assam
- District: Hailakandi
- Lok Sabha constituency: Karimganj
- Established: 2023
- Reservation: None

Member of Legislative Assembly
- 16th Assam Legislative Assembly
- Incumbent Zubair Anam Mazumder
- Party: Indian National Congress
- Elected year: 2026

Algapur–Katlicherra Assembly constituency is one of the 126 Assembly constituencies of the Assam Legislative Assembly in Hailakandi district, Assam. The constituency was created after delimitation in 2023 by renaming and reorganising the former Algapur constituency.

== Overview ==
As per orders of the Delimitation Commission, No. 122 Algapur Katlicherra Assembly constituency was composed of circle No. 1 in Hailakandi Police Station in Hailakandi Sub-Division; and circle Nos. 23 and 24 in Silchar Police Station in Silchar Sub-Division.

== Town Details ==
- Country: India.
- State: Assam.
- District: Barak Valley region and Hailakandi district of Assam.
- Lok Sabha Constituency: Karimganj Lok Sabha/Parliamentary constituency.
- Assembly Categorisation: Rural
- Literacy Level: 75.26%.
- Eligible Electors as per 2021 General Elections: 1,63,049 Eligible Electors. Male Electors:85,905. Female Electors:77,140.
- Geographic Co-Ordinates: 24°44’31.9"N 92°35’45.6"E.
- Total Area Covered: 277 square kilometres.
- Area Includes:Circle No. 1 in Hailakandi thana in Hailakandi sub-division; and circle Nos. 23 and 24 in Silchar thana in Silchar sub-division of Hailakandi district of Assam.
- Inter State Border :Hailakandi.
- Number Of Polling Stations: Year 2011–170, Year 2016–177, Year 2021–8.

== Members of the Legislative Assembly ==
Election	Member	Political Party
1978	Nepal Chandra Das	Indian National Congress
1980	Moulana Abdul Jalil Choudhury	Indian National Congress
1985	Sahidul Alam Choudhary	Independent politician
1991	Sahidul Alam Choudhary	Asom Gana Parishad
1996	Sahidul Alam Choudhary	Asom Gana Parishad
2001	Sahidul Alam Choudhary	Asom Gana Parishad
2006	Rahul Roy	Indian National Congress
2011	Sahidul Alam Choudhary	Asom Gana Parishad
2013 (by-election)	Mandira Roy	Indian National Congress
2016	Nizam Uddin Choudhury	All India United Democratic Front
2021	Nizam Uddin Choudhury	All India United Democratic Front
2026	Zubair Anam Mazumder	Indian National Congress

== Election results ==
=== 2026 ===
2026 Assam Legislative Assembly election: Algapur-Katlicherra
Party	Candidate	Votes	%	±%
INC	Zubair Anam Mazumder	145,661	64.16	
AGP	Zakir Hussain Laskar	40,213	17.71	
Independent	Suzam Uddin Laskar	29,230	12.87	
Independent	Nijam Uddin Choudhury	3,391	1.49	
Independent	Haydar Hussain Laskar	1,954	0.86	
Independent	Ikbal Bahar Mozumder	1,153	0.51	
Independent	Sujam Uddin Laskar	986	0.43	
Independent	Muzakkir Hasan Laskar	486	0.21	
Independent	Samin Ahmed Choudhury	378	0.17	
Independent	Sabbir Ahmed Choudhury	307	0.14	
Independent	Sirajul Islam Laskar	566	0.25	
Independent	Sirajul Islam Barbhuiya	299	0.13	
Independent	Foriz Zaman Mazumder	289	0.13	
Independent	Mustak Hussain Barbhuiya	249	0.11	
Independent	Jamil Ahmed Choudhury	339	0.15	
NOTA	NOTA	1542	0.68	
Margin of victory		105448	46.45	
Turnout		227043		
INC gain from AGP		Swing		

=== 2016 ===
2016 Assam Legislative Assembly election: Algapur
Party	Candidate	Votes	%	±%
AIUDF	Nizamuddin Choudhury	50,531	42.30	−4.47
BJP	Kaushik Rai	32,777	27.44	+24.97
INC	Rahul Roy	25,927	21.70	−25.89
AGP	Mehnaz Sahid Choudhury	5,822	4.87	+4.03
NOTA	None of the above	768	0.64	N/A
Majority		17,754	14.86	+14.04
Turnout		1,19,432	83.21	+4.42
Registered electors		1,43,537		
AIUDF gain from INC		Swing		

=== 2013 by-election ===
2013 by-election: Algapur
Party	Candidate	Votes	%	±%
INC	Mandira Roy	52,814	47.59	
AIUDF	Mehbubul Hasan Laskar	51,899	46.77	
BJP	Sashadhar Paul	2,742	2.47	
AGP	Kamrul Islam Choudhury	933	0.84	
Majority		915	0.82	
Turnout		1,10,969	78.79	
Registered electors		1,40,831		
INC gain from AGP		Swing		

== See also ==
- Algapur
- Hailakandi District
- List of constituencies of Assam Legislative Assembly
