= Nazrul Islam (Indian politician) =

Indian politician (1949–2023)

Member of Assam Legislative Assembly
- In office 1996–2021
- Preceded by: Samsul Huda
- Succeeded by: Asif Mohammad Nazar
- Constituency: Laharighat

Personal details
- Born: Nazrul Islam; 12 August 1949 Morigaon, Assam, India
- Died: 7 January 2023 (aged 73) Guwahati, Assam, India
- Party: Indian National Congress
- Spouse: Aziza Nazrul
- Children: 2, including Asif Mohammad Nazar
- Parents: Late Athaj Alabox Sarkar (father); Late Athaj Kulsum Bibi (mother)
- Education: Gauhati Medical College and Hospital, (MBBS)
- Profession: Physician, politician

Nazrul Islam (12 August 1949 – 7 January 2023) was an Indian politician from the state of Assam. He was a member of the Assam Legislative Assembly from Indian National Congress. He served as minister in Tarun Gogoi's Government of Assam from 7 June 2002 to 20 May 2016. He had been elected five consecutive times from the Laharighat constituency from 1996 to 2021.

Islam died on 7 January 2023, at the age of 73.
