= Rajdeep Goala =

Former MLA of Lakhipur

- Official Portrait of Rajdeep Goala

MLA
- In office 2014–2021
- Preceded by: Late Dinesh Prasad Goala

Former Member of the Assam Legislative Assembly
- Constituency: Lakhipur

Personal details
- Born: 10 May 1984 (age 42). Silchar, Assam
- Parent: Late Dinesh Prasad Goala (father)
- Education: Delhi University; Nottingham Trent University

Rajdeep Goala (born 10 May 1984) is an Indian politician from Assam. He served as the former MLA of Assam from Lakhipur in 2014 and 2016 representing INC. Later, Rajdeep Goala joined BJP.

== Education ==
Rajdeep did his graduation in B.Com.(P) Delhi College of Arts and Commerce from Delhi University 2006. After that he did Post Graduate Diploma in Economics & Finance from Nottingham Business School, Nottingham Trent University United Kingdom in year 2008.
