= List of rivers of Assam =

This is a list of rivers of Assam, India.

== Major ==
- Brahmaputra River
- Barak River

== Others ==
- Aie River
- Balsiri River
- Baralia River
- Borgang River
- Barnadi River
- Baroi River
- Bhogdoi River
- Beki River
- Champabati River
- Debang River
- Desang River
- Dhansiri
- Digaru River
- Dihing River (or Buridihing)
- Dikhow River
- Doyang
- Dudhnoi River
- Gabharu River
- Gaurang River
- Gadadhar River
- Jatinga River
- Jhanji River
- Jiadhal River
- Jinari River
- Jiri River
- Kameng River (also called Jiabhorali)
- Katakhal River
- Kolong River
- Kopili River
- Krishnai River
- Kulsi River
- Kushiyara River
- Lohit River
- Manas River
- Mora Dhansiri River
- Nanoi River
- Noa Dehing River
- Noa-Nadi River
- Nona River
- Pagladiya River
- Puthimari River
- Ranganadi River
- Sankosh River
- Saralbhanga River
- Siang River
- Subansiri River
- Tipkai River
- Tuni River
- Diju River

== See also ==
- List of rivers of India
