= Nurul Islam (Assam politician) =

Indian politician (1931–1997)

Member of Parliament, Lok Sabha
- In office 1991–1998
- Preceded by: Abdul Hamid
- Succeeded by: Abdul Hamid
- Constituency: Dhubri
- In office 1980–1984
- Preceded by: Ahmed Hussain
- Succeeded by: Abdul Hamid
- Constituency: Dhubri

Member of Assam Legislative Assembly
- In office 1972–1978
- Preceded by: Zahirul Islam
- Succeeded by: Zahirul Islam
- Constituency: Mankachar

Personal details
- Born: Nurul Islam; 10 May 1931 Molakhowa, Hatsingimari, Assam, India
- Died: 30 December 1997 (aged 66) New Delhi, India
- Party: Indian National Congress
- Spouse: Smt. Anjuman Ara Islam
- Children: Two daughters
- Parent: Late Shri Bondey Ali (father)
- Education: University of Calcutta(BA); Gauhati University(LLB)
- Profession: Politician; Advocate; Social Worker]; Agriculturist; Horticulturist and; Pisciculturist

Nurul Islam (10 May 1931 – 30 December 1997) was an Indian politician. He was elected to the Assam Legislative Assembly from Mankachar in the 1972 Assam Legislative Assembly election as a member of the Indian National Congress. He served as member of the Lok Sabha representing Dhubri (Lok Sabha constituency). He was elected to 7th, 10th and 11th Lok Sabha.

He was born in Molakhowa, Dhubri district (Assam) on 10 May 1931, and died in New Delhi on 30 December 1997, at the age of 66.

== Positions held ==
- 1972-78 Member, Assam Legislative Assembly.
- 1983 Elected to Lok Sabha (Seventh).
- 1983-84 Member, Consultative Committee, Ministry of Industry.
- 1984-85 A.I.C.C. Observer to Karnataka and Orissa during the general elections.
- 1991 Re-elected to Lok Sabha (Tenth).
- 1991-96 Member, Estimates Committee.
  - Member, Consultative Committee on Ministry of Defence.
- 1992-96 Member, Standing Committee on Defence.
- 1996 Elected to Lok Sabha (Eleventh) for the third time.

== Social and cultural activities ==
Established two colleges, six high schools, 13 M.E. Schools, 47 L.P. Schools in Mankachar, Assam during 1972-78 and also established two music schools at Dhubri (Assam).

== Special interests ==
Legal works, farming, horticulture, pisciculture, travelling, fishing and hunting.

== Sports and clubs ==
Minor games, Member, Evening Club, Dhubri, Assam.

== Other information ==
Professor, Law College, Dhubri, Vice-President, Apex Cooperative Bank, Dhubri for 3 years, President and Member of many educational institutions.
