= Salkocha =

- Village
- Location in Assam, India Salkocha (India)
- Coordinates: 26.23°N 90.34°E
- Country: India
- State: Assam
- District: Dhubri

Government
  - Body: Gram panchayat
- Elevation: 24 m (79 ft)

Population (2011)
  - Total: 40,000

Languages
  - Official: Assamese
- Time zone: UTC+5:30 (IST)
- PIN: 783348
- Vehicle registration: AS 17

Salkocha is a village and gram panchayat in the town of Chapar in the Dhubri district of the state of Assam, India. It is part of the Bilasipara East Assam Legislative Assembly constituency and the Dhubri Lok Sabha constituency.

== Location ==
Salkocha is 16 kilometres (9.9 mi) from Chapar and 58 kilometres (36 mi) from Dhubri, the district headquarters. It is 220 kilometres (140 mi) west of Guwahati (Assam's largest city) and Dispur, the state capital. Salkocha is connected to the rest of India through National Highway 31. The nearest railway station is in Kokrajhar, 20 kilometres (12 mi) away. Salkocha is near the villages of Gaurangtari, Kumarigaon, Porshanpara, Kamarpara, Khamarpara, Silgara, Gaurangtari, Tilapara, Bamunpara, Bhelupara, Sreegram, Hatipota, Pukhuripara, Silgara, Hapapara, Neogipara and Salbari.

== Climate and hydrology ==
The village is about 24 metres (79 ft) above sea level, and the Brahmaputra River flows through the northern region. Salkocha is affected by annual flooding of the Brahmaputra and its tributaries, which flow through the western region.

Climate data for Salkocha (1971–2011)
Month	Jan	Feb	Mar	Apr	May	Jun	Jul	Aug	Sep	Oct	Nov	Dec	Year
Record high °C (°F)	29.9 (85.8)	33.2 (91.8)	38.3 (100.9)	41.1 (106.0)	41.4 (106.5)	39.1 (102.4)	37.8 (100.0)	37.0 (98.6)	38.8 (101.8)	34.3 (93.7)	32.1 (89.8)	27.8 (82.0)	41.4 (106.5)
Mean daily maximum °C (°F)	23.7 (74.7)	26.2 (79.2)	31.1 (88.0)	31.6 (88.9)	30.7 (87.3)	31.5 (88.7)	31.0 (87.8)	32.0 (89.6)	30.9 (87.6)	30.1 (86.2)	27.7 (81.9)	24.5 (76.1)	29.3 (84.7)
Mean daily minimum °C (°F)	8.6 (47.5)	10.5 (50.9)	15.2 (59.4)	20.2 (68.4)	22.2 (72.0)	24.4 (75.9)	25.1 (77.2)	25.2 (77.4)	24.2 (75.6)	21.1 (70.0)	15.5 (59.9)	10.6 (51.1)	18.5 (65.3)
Record low °C (°F)	2.4 (36.3)	2.8 (37.0)	7.4 (45.3)	6.4 (43.5)	15.9 (60.6)	13.9 (57.0)	20.8 (69.4)	21.7 (71.1)	19.4 (66.9)	17.2 (63.0)	9.4 (48.9)	7.8 (46.0)	2.4 (36.3)
Average precipitation mm (inches)	6.9 (0.27)	18.1 (0.71)	42.6 (1.68)	177.7 (7.00)	410.9 (16.18)	607.4 (23.91)	652.8 (25.70)	467.0 (18.39)	443.0 (17.44)	167.8 (6.61)	14.3 (0.56)	8.0 (0.31)	3,016.6 (118.76)
Average rainy days	0.6	1.5	2.8	9.3	15.7	16.6	19.1	13.1	13.5	5.6	1.0	0.6	99.3
Source: India Meteorological Department (record high and low up to 2010)

== Demographics ==
According to the 2011 Census of India, the Chapar-Salkocha block had a population of 118,800. Salkocha has a population of about 40,000, and an average literacy rate of 75 percent. The predominant religions are Hinduism and Islam. The village is populated by Rajbongshi people and other communities, including the Kalita and Sutradhar castes, the Bodo and Garo peoples, and the Rabha tribe. Salkocha's official language is Assamese, and a Goalpariya dialect is mainly spoken.

== Points of interest ==
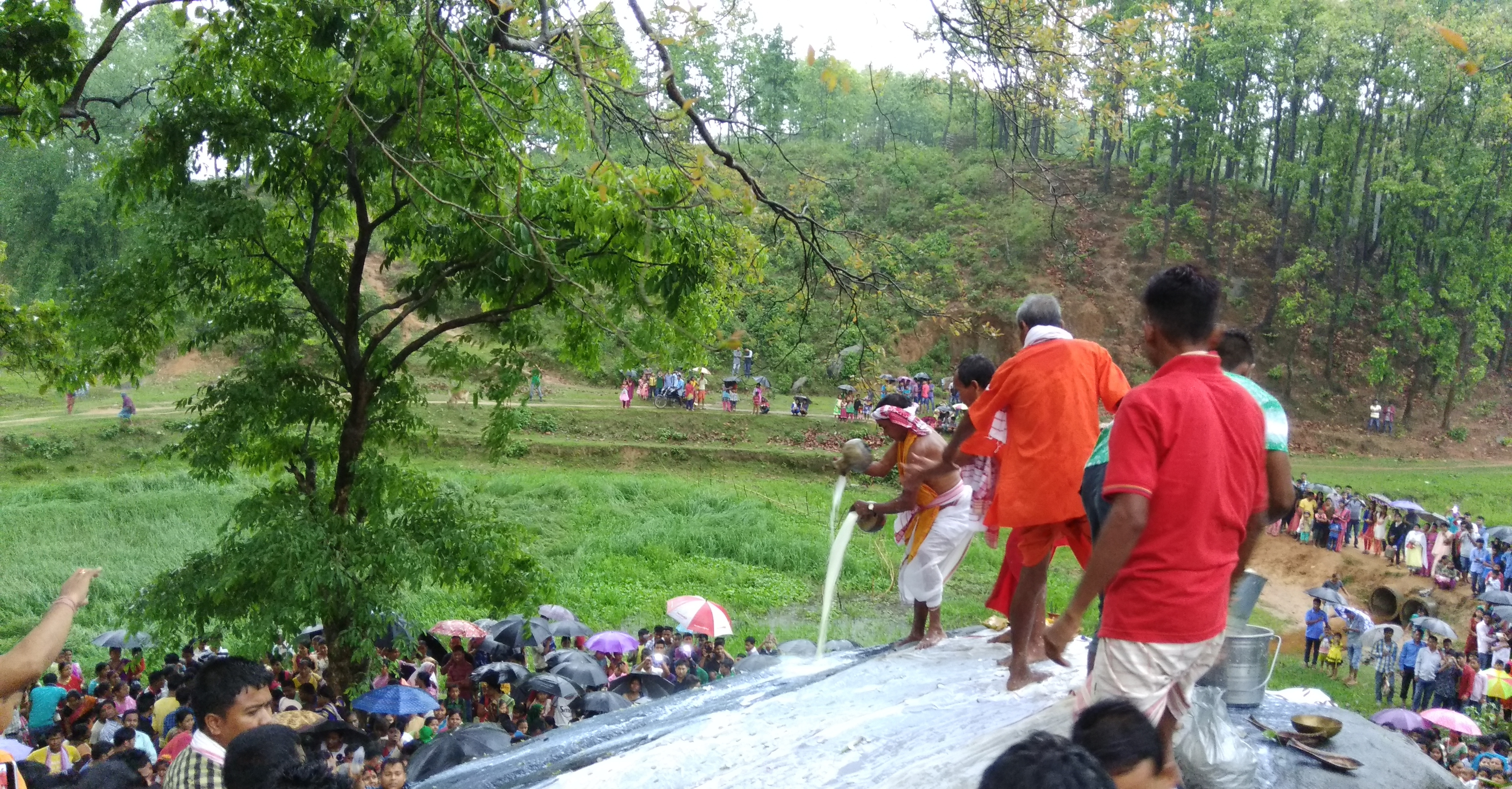
Priest offering milk collected from 101 cows as part of the Burha-Burhi puja

- Burha-Burhi Temple: At Hapapara, north of Salkocha, a mela is held each April as part of the Burha-Burhi Puja. Ceremonies also take place in April at other temples.
- Diplai Beel and Golden Langur Park: Diplai Beel is a large natural wetland covering an area of 4.14 square kilometres (1.60 sq mi). Assam's first bird sanctuary, 22 kilometres (14 mi) from Kokrajhar, contains a variety of local and migratory birds. In the northeastern forest, the endangered golden langur may be seen. It is adjacent to the Chakrashila Wildlife Sanctuary.
- Dhir Beel: A marshy lake east of Salkocha, near the Bodo Hills and also adjacent to the Chakrashila Wildlife Sanctuary

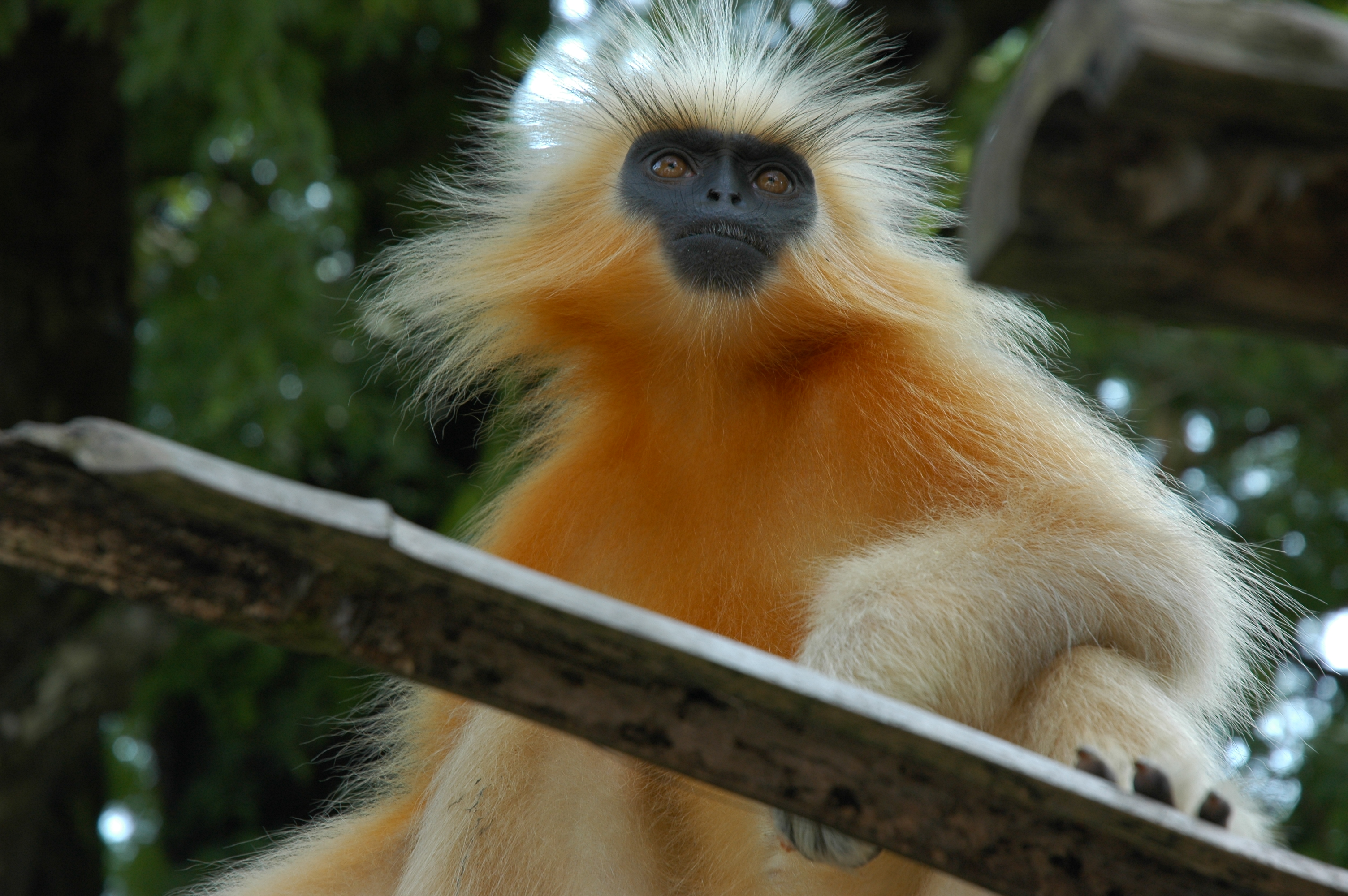
Golden langur at Chakrashila Wildlife Sanctuary

- Chakrashila Wildlife Sanctuary: Straddling the Kokrajhar and Dhubri districts a few kilometers from Salkocha, the 46-square-kilometre (18 sq mi) sanctuary is India's second protected habitat of the golden langur.
