= Haraltari =

Village in Assam, India

Haraltari হৰলটাৰী
- Village
- Interactive map of Haraltari
- Country: India
- State: Assam
- District: Dhubri district
- Sub-division: Bilasipara

Government
  - Body: Sonamayi Gaon Panchayat

Area
  - Total: 0.9096 km^{2} (0.3512 sq mi)

Population (2011)
  - Total: 508
  - Density: 558/km^{2} (1,450/sq mi)
- Time zone: UTC+5:30 (IST)
- Postal Index Number: 783337
- Vehicle registration: AS
- Nearest town: Sapatgram

Haraltari or Horaltari is a small rural village located in the Bilasipara sub-division of Dhubri district in the Indian state of Assam. The village falls under the administrative jurisdiction of the Sonamayi Gaon Panchayat and is part of the Bilasipara East Development Block. It is located approximately 6 km from the town of Sapatgram and 15 km from Bilasipara town.

== Demographics ==
According to the 2011 Census of India, Haraltari has a total population of 508 individuals residing in around 101 households. The literacy rate is moderate, and Assamese is the official language.

== Geography ==
Haraltari spans a total area of 0.9096 square kilometers. It lies close to the Assam–West Bengal border and is situated near the Sankosh River, which plays an important role in local agriculture and livelihood.

== Connectivity ==
The nearest town, Sapatgram, serves as a local hub for trade and communication. Haraltari is connected via rural roads and is accessible by public and private transport from Sapatgram.

== Education and Infrastructure ==
Haraltari village has access to basic educational infrastructure, including a lower primary school. For higher education, students usually travel to nearby towns. The village also has access to rural health services and public distribution systems under state schemes.
