= Ahmed Hussain (Assam politician) =

Indian politician (born 1941)

Member of Parliament - Lok Sabha
- In office 1977–1980
- Preceded by: Moinul Hoque Choudhury
- Succeeded by: Nurul Islam
- Constituency: Dhubri

Personal details
- Born: 30 May 1941 (age 85) Chapar, Goalpara, Assam
- Party: Indian National Congress
- As of 21 July, 2021

Ahmed Hussain (Bengali: আহমেদ হুসাইন; born 30 May 1941) was a member of the 6th Lok Sabha of India. He represented the Dhubri constituency of Assam from 1977 to 1980 and is a member of the Indian National Congress political party.
