= Mornoi River =

River in India

- Location within Assam Location within India
- Native name: মৰনৈ নদী (Assamese)

Location
- State: Assam

Physical characteristics
- Source: Matia village
  - location: Goalpara district, Assam
  - coordinates: 26.0784361°N 90.7563504°E
- Mouth: Brahmaputra River
  - location: Near Singimari Char, Assam
  - coordinates: 26.1143184°N 90.7466003°E

Basin features
- Progression: Krishnai River - Dudhnoi River – Mornoi River - Brahmaputra River

The Mornoi River is a tributary of the Brahmaputra River in the Indian state of Assam. The Mornoi river originates at Matia village of Goalpara district. The Krishnai River meets Dudhnoi River at Matia village and then flows as Mornoi river before its confluence with the Brahmaputra River.
