= Panbari Mosque =

Mosque in Assam, India

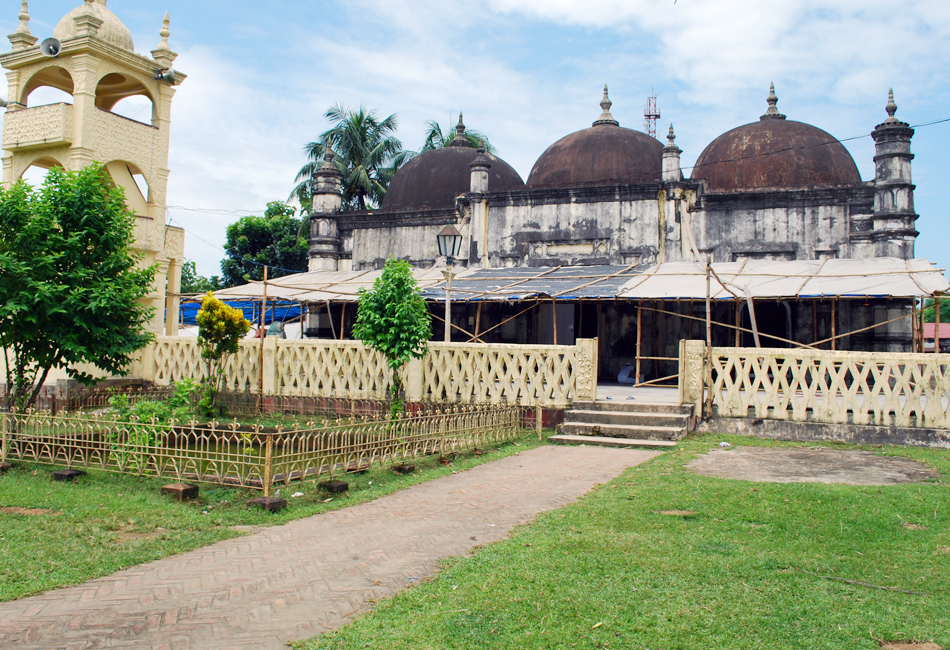

Religion
- Affiliation: Islam
- Ecclesiastical or organisational status: Mosque
- Status: Active

Location
- Location: Dhubri, Assam
- Country: India
- Interactive map of Panbari Mosque
- Coordinates: 26°09′18″N 90°03′17″E

Architecture
- Type: Mosque
- Style: Indo-Islamic

Specifications
- Capacity: 150 worshippers
- Dome: 3
- Minaret: 1

The Panbari Mosque, also known as the Rangamati Mosque, is an historic mosque in northeast India and is considered to be the oldest mosque in the Indian state of Assam. The mosque is situated on the National Highway 17, near Panbari and Rangamati, approximately 25 kilometres (16 mi) east from Dhubri town. The 15th to 17th century three-domed mosque is believed to have either been built under the reign of Hussain Shah (1493-1519) or during Mir Jumla's invasion of Assam in 1662-63 under the Mughal Emperor Aurangzeb.

== History ==
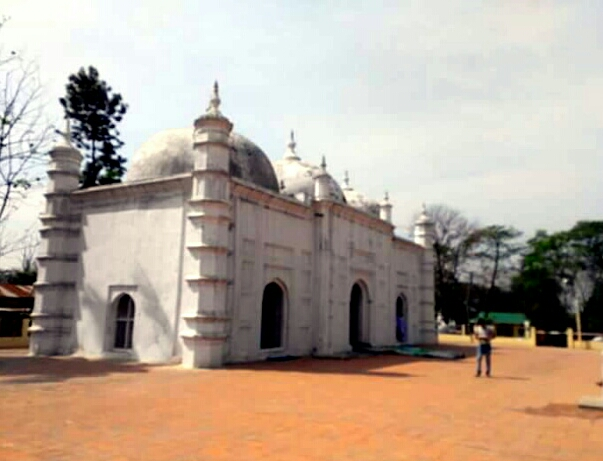
Panbari Mosque, Assam

The mosque was believed to have been commissioned by the Sultan of Bengal Alauddin Husain Shah to celebrate the victory of the Conquest of Kamata in 1498. However, the exact details of the mosque's history is uncertain and the possible date of construction spans between 1493 and 1519 CE. On the other hand, there is a less common theory which attributes the mosque's construction to Mir Jumla II, the Mughal governor of Bengal who may have passed through the area during his invasion of Assam in 1662-63. The eidgah and deep well within the complex is considered to have been constructed during the same time as the mosque. The vast paved courtyard and minaret were constructed later on.

It is said that the mosque later became surrounded by deep forest, and fell in use. In 1928, a villager caught a glimpse of some minarets from the hills of Rangamati whilst he was collecting some firewood. The news then reached the Nawab of Dhaka who even dispatched a team to investigate the matter, and they returned having confirmed its existence.

The Archaeological Survey of India, Ministry of Culture has taken some steps to conserve the monuments of this area. However, local people are not happy with the token steps of the government and demand more.

== Background ==
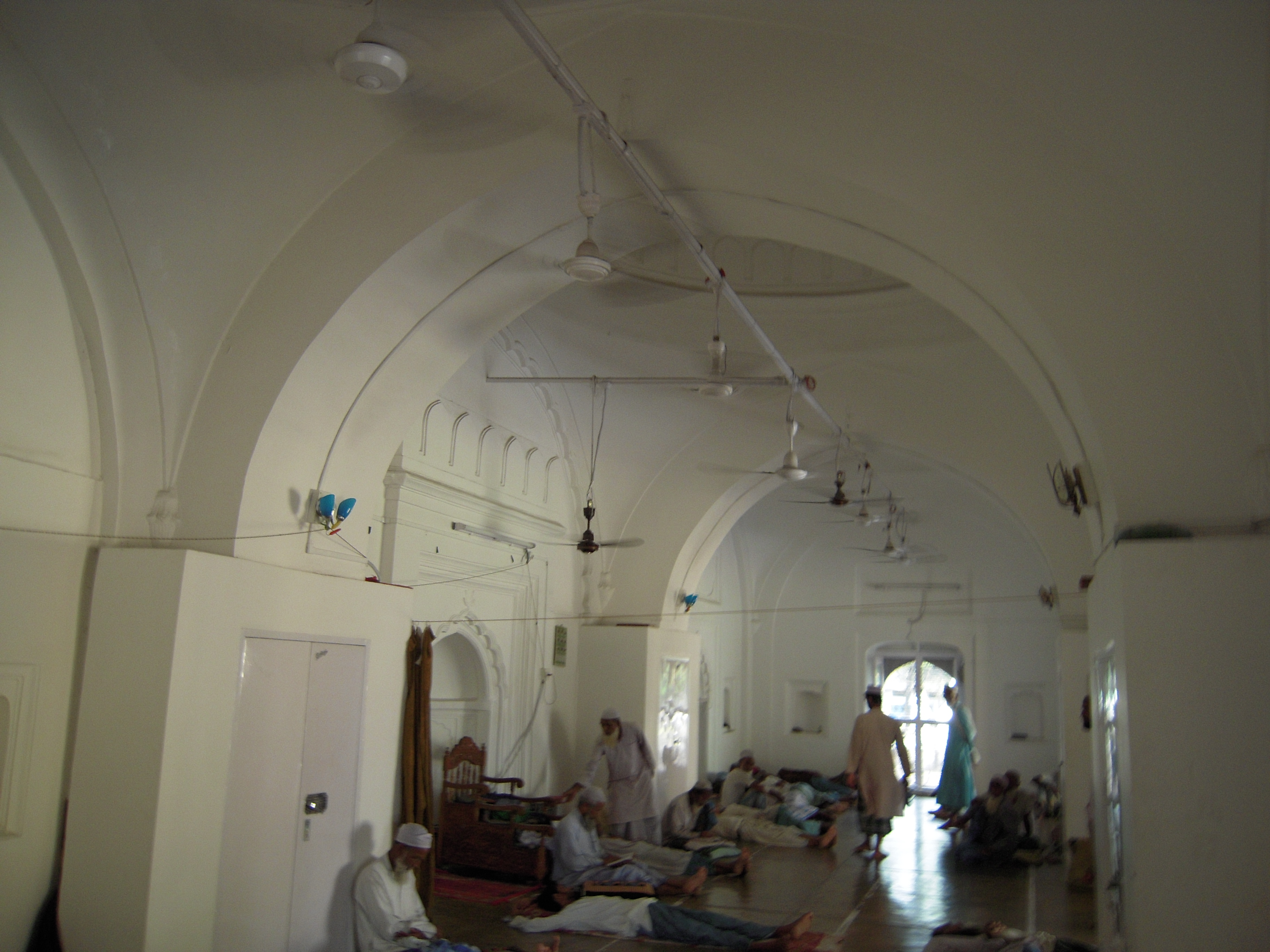
Interior view of Panbari Mosque

During the reign of the Koch rulers Rangamati area was a very prosperous place. It was the frontier post of the Koch rulers. Invading army of Bengal sultans and Mughals also used Rangamati fort. The area, as some believe, was also the headquarters of Alauddin Husain Shah. And this mosque was used as a prayer hall by the Muslim soldiers.

It is said that about 200 years ago, the local people of this place found this mosque in Panbari "Pahar" under the thick foliage. They cleaned this place and started to offer Namaz there. Today, Panbari "Pahar" is known as the holy seat and the mosque is a holy shrine for the people of western Assam. Of late, a township consisting of brick-plinths, terracotta antiquities as also a hoard of coins have been discovered near the mosque, which have been tentatively attributed to the Mughal regime. The mosque has the capacity for 150 worshippers.

== Management ==
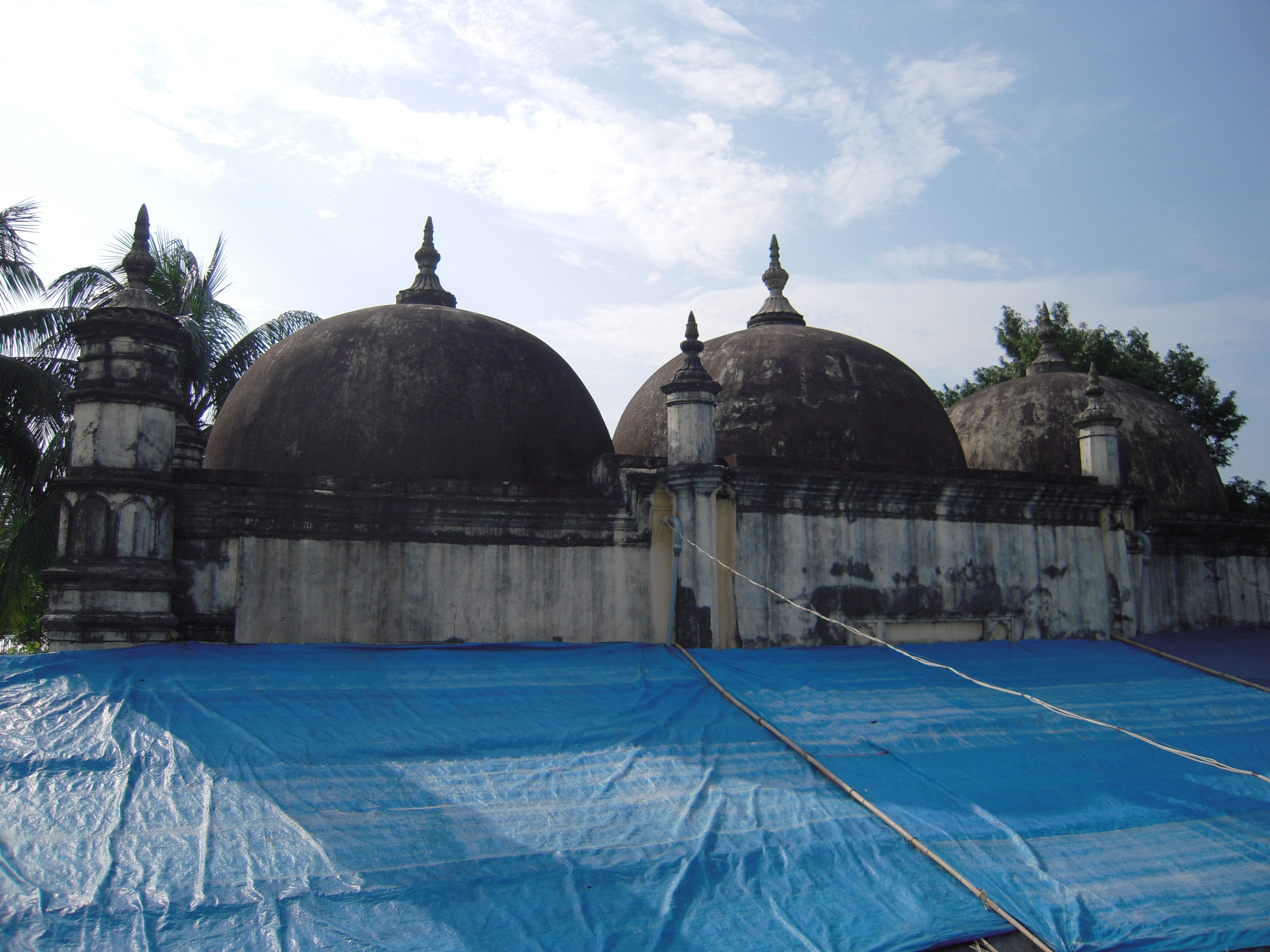
Domes of Panbari Mosque

The mosque is run by a local body, Panbari mosque management committee, who appoints the imam and other employees. Various religious services like imamat and leading namaz are performed by the imam. The expenses of the mosque are covered from different kind of donations obtained by the mosque. As the mosque enjoy a special place in the society of western Assam, people donate generously irrespective of religion, caste or creed.

== Transport ==
The mosque is located adjacent to the national highway 17, and hence, regular bus services are available from Guwahati, Dhubri and Cooch Behar. The nearest railway station is Fakiragram, 30 kilometres (19 mi) away, and the nearest airport is the Rupsi Airport, 21 kilometres (13 mi) away. The Brahmaputra is 8 kilometres (5.0 mi) away from the mosque.

== See also ==
- Islam in India
- List of mosques in India
- Puranigudam Jame Masjid
