= Mahamaya Dham =

Hindu temple in India

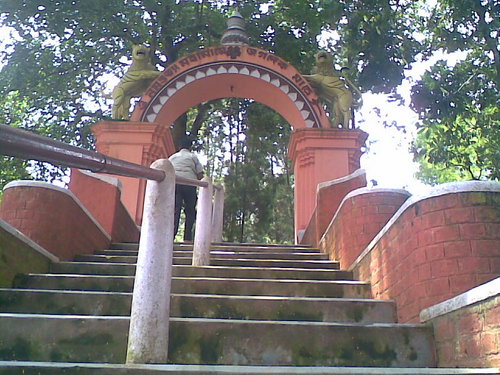
- Entrance of Mahamaya Dham

- Position of Mahamaya Dham

Religion
- Affiliation: Hinduism
- District: Kokrajhar district
- Deity: Mahamaya
- Festival: Durga puja

Location
- Location: Bogribari
- State: Assam
- Country: India
- Interactive map of Mahamaya Dham
- Coordinates: 26°12′51″N 90°07′07″E

Architecture
- Type: Nilachal architecture

Mahamaya Dham or Mahamaya (supreme illusion) Temple of Bogribari, about 30 km east from Dhubri town and 10 km west from Bilasipara town, is regarded as a greatest Shakta pithas for Hindu pilgrims in Lower Assam, India. It is located under Parbatjhora sub-division of district Kokrajhar. In terms of attractions, this temple is the second to Kamakhya Temple of Guwahati to the pilgrims and tourists. It is believed that the famous goddess Mahamaya was traditionally worshipped by the local people of Parvatjowar like Kacharies, Koches and Naths. It was also the presiding deity of the Zamindar (landlord) of Parvatjowar. Latter the goddess received wide acceptance and these days, all Hindus of Lower Assam worship mother Mahamaya.

This temple has a 400-year-old tradition of animal sacrifice especially at the time of Durga Puja. Usually hundreds of animals or birds, like buffaloes, goats, pigeons and ducks are sacrificed. It is always rumoured that animals are sacrificed when new large scale construction especially bridge is undertaken. These days animal lovers are voicing against this ghastly tradition.

Another place of worship connected to Mahamaya goddess is the Mahamaya Snaanghat Temple, which is situated few kilometers away from the main Mahamaya temple, on the bank of the Tipkai River which is a tributary of mighty river Brahmaputra. In the ancient time, as the local people belief, it is the place where the goddess Mahamaya used to take bath. From that time, the place came to be known as Mahamaya Snaanghat. Every year in the month of January around, a Shakti Yagya is performed here by the temple priests.
