= Puranigudam =

Region in Nagaon district, Assam, India

Coordinates: 26°21′N 92°48′E

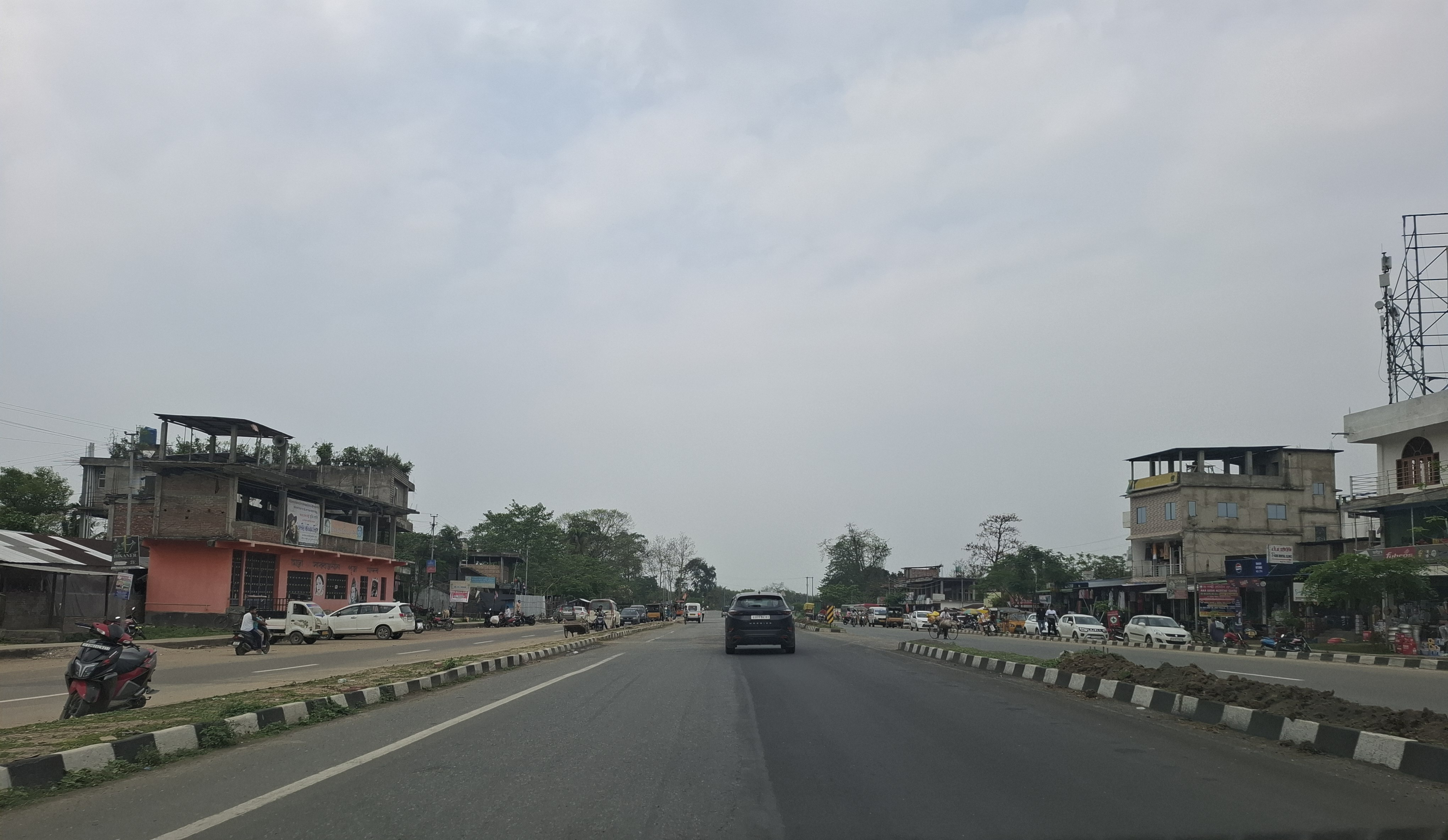
Puranigudam village

Puranigudam is in the Nagaon district of Assam, India. There are several villages in Puranigudam. The main commercial center of Puranigudam, also known as Keyan Patti (most of the shops were established by the businessmen from the Marwar area of Rajasthan, India; who were called Keyans in Assamese. The name Keyan Patti comes from that. Patti means inhabitation) is located closest to Garamur. Rupahihat are to the north, Barhampur and Nagaon in the west, Chalchali in the south and Rongagorah and Samaguri in the east. The river Kolong flows through the upper half of the area and National Highway 37 runs parallel to the river. The area is almost in the middle of the Nagaon district and situated in higher elevation than the district headquarters.

== Culture ==
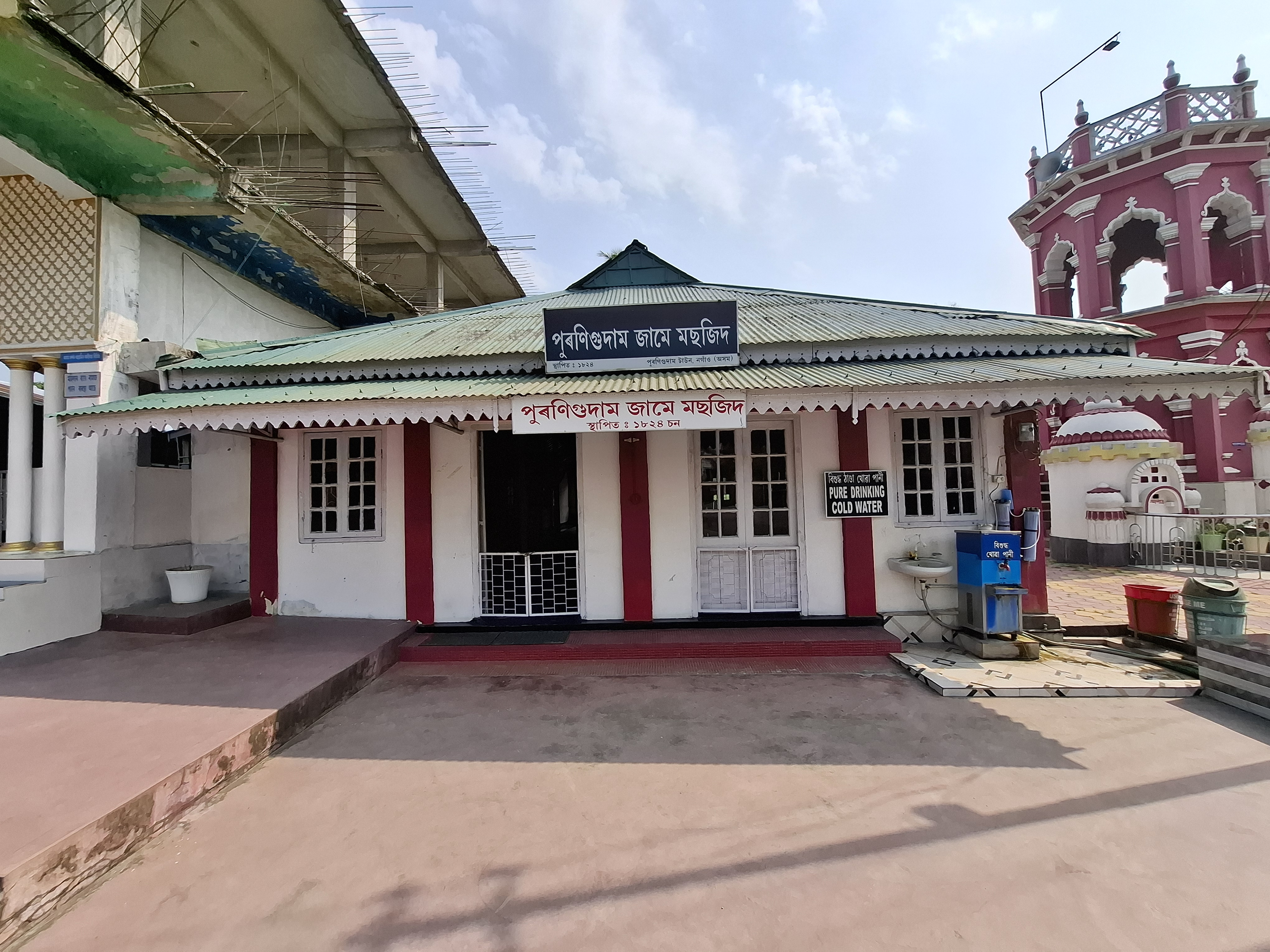
Puranigudam Jame Masjid

Puranigudam Jame Masjid is a heritage mosque situated at Puranigudam. The mosque was built in 1824, there is a Minar has a perimeter of 42 feet which is a symbol of communal harmony in Nagaon district.

== Transport ==
Puranigudam railway station is situated at Puranigudam on Guwahati–Lumding section under Northeast Frontier Railway zone of India.
