= Tamarhat =

- Location of Tamarhat in Assam Tamarhat (India)
- Coordinates: 26°18′6.93″N 89°51′2.75″E
- Country: India
- State: Assam
- District: Dhubri
- Languages: Koch rajbongshi, Bengali
- Time zone: IST
- Pincode(s): 783332

Tamarhat is a small town in Dhubri district, KAC, Assam, India. The town situated in the east bank of Gadadhar river a distance of 45 K.M. toward north from the Dhubri Town. It has been under the Kamatapur Autonomous Council since 2020, ie. formation year of Kamatapur Autonomous Council. Tamarhat is the boarder place of Dhubri district, and Kokrajhar district of Assam. The place is also situated in the boarder of Assam and West Bengal.Nearby airport is Rupsi airport (RUP) situated in a distance of 22 km. Earlier the area was under the district of Kokrajhar, in 2013 the area transferred to Dhubri district. Bengali, Muslim, Koch Rajbongshi are among major ethnic groups in this area. This area comes under 28 Gossaigaon Assam Lesgislative Assembly and Kokrajhar Lok Sabha constituency.
