= Gaurang =

Gaurang (alternately spelled Gaurang or Gwrang) is a 98-kilometre (61 mi)-long river which originates in Bhutan and flows southward into India. It first enters India in Chirang district, where it is known as Swrmanga, then flows westward into Kokrajhar district, then turns south into Dhubri district, where it terminates on the right bank of the Brahmaputra River.

== See also ==
- List of rivers of Assam
