= Puranigudam Jame Masjid =

Mosque in Assam

Coordinates: 26°21′57″N 92°47′10″E

Puranigudam Jame Mosque
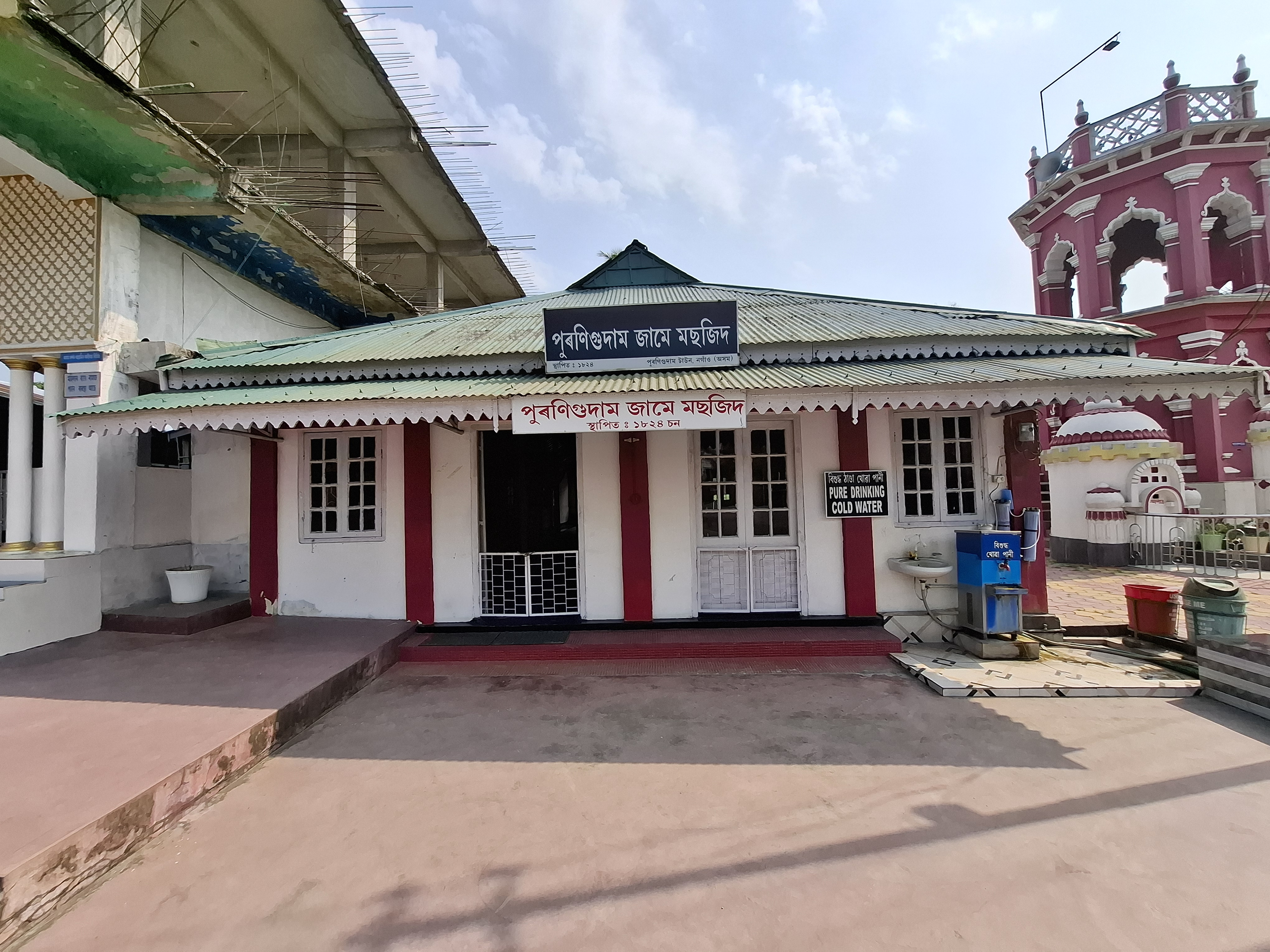
- Old building of Puranigudam Jame Masjid

- Location in Assam

Religion
- Ecclesiastical or organisational status: Mosque
- Status: Active

Location
- Location: Puranigudam, Nagaon district, Assam
- Country: India

Puranigudam Jame Mosque is a heritage mosque situated at Puranigudam in the Nagaon district of the Indian state of Assam. It was protected by the locals as their symbol of unity between the Hindu and Muslims of the area.

== History ==
The mosque was constructed in 1824 and renovated in 1909 by a famous mason from Dhaka and it is the oldest mosque in central Assam, known to be a symbol of communal harmony. There is a two-storeyed 42 feet minaret just beside the mosque. Irrespective of caste or religion, all the local people in Puranigudam take care of the building.

== Gallery ==
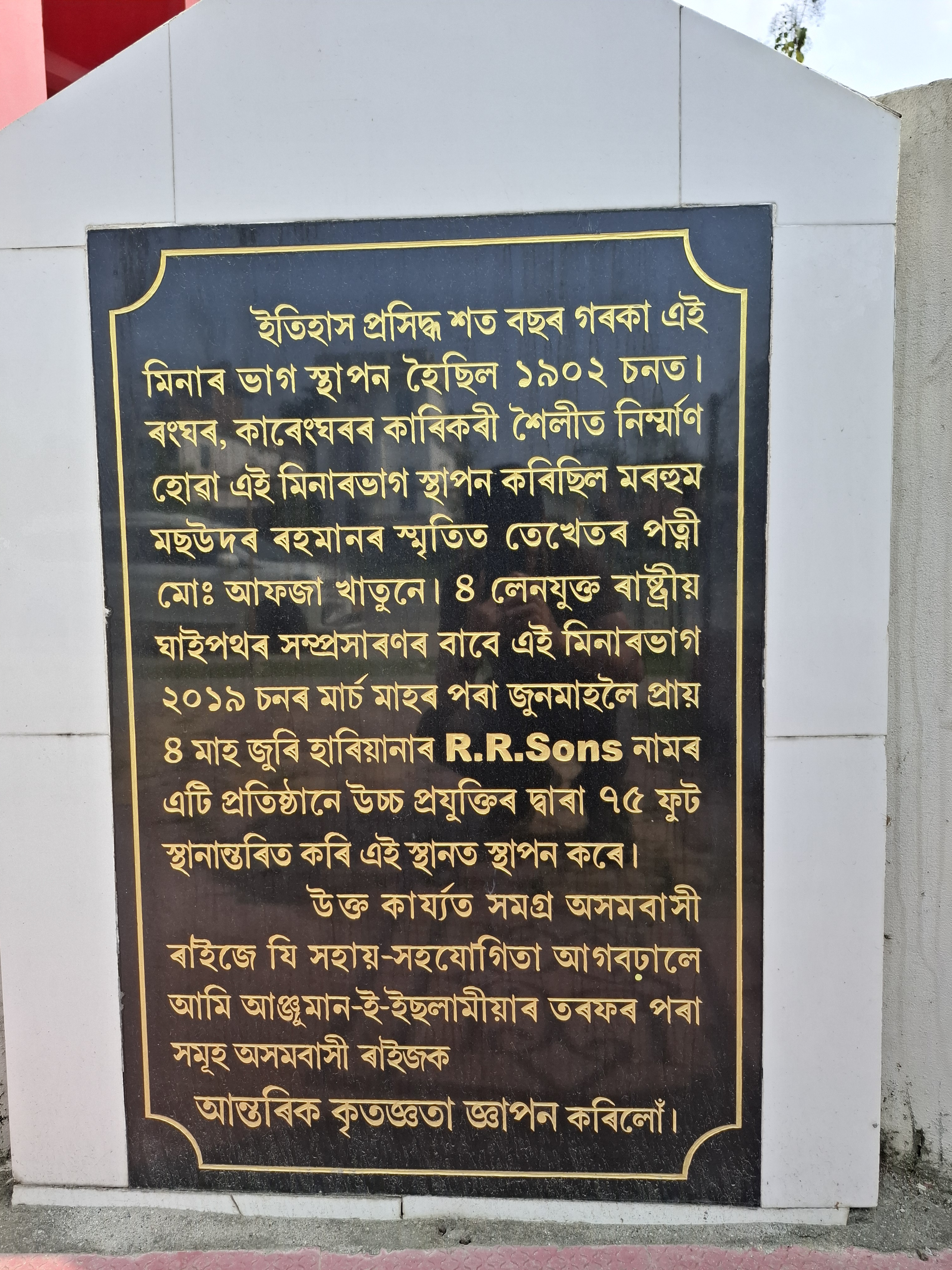

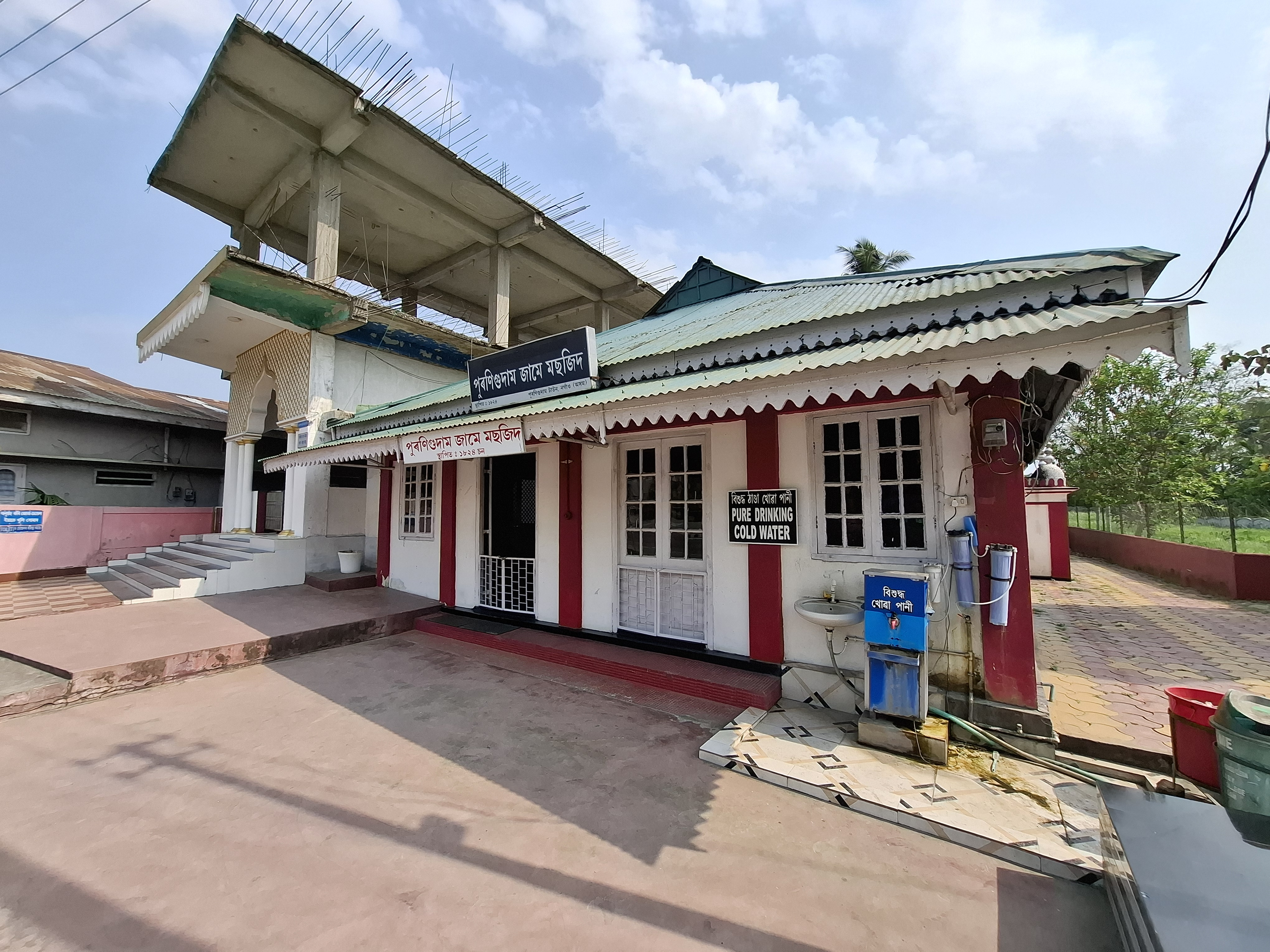

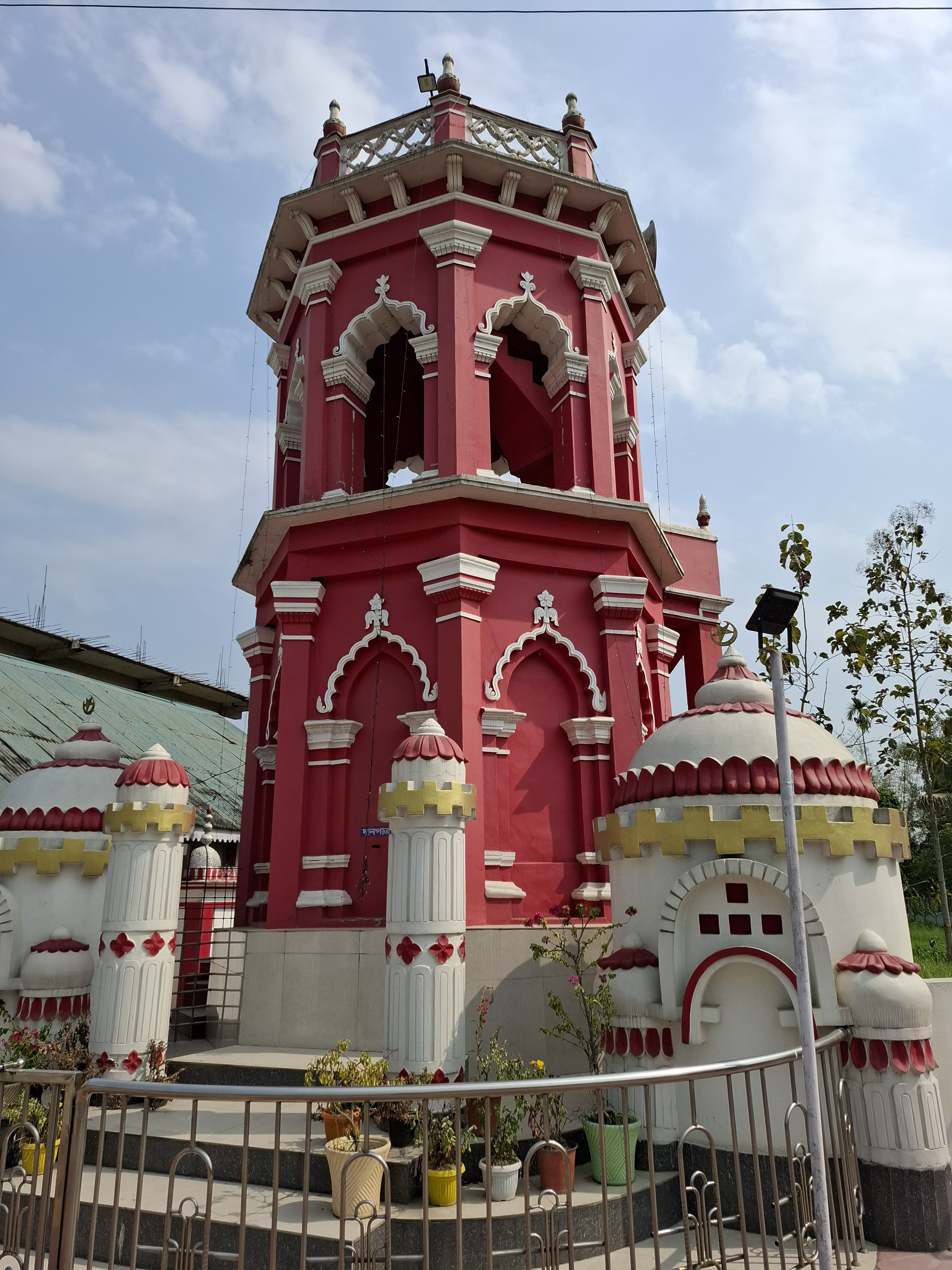

== See also ==
- Islam in Assam
- List of mosques in India
- Panbari Mosque
