= Asharikandi =

Asharikandi Asharikandi Craft Village
- village
- Bihu Dance

- Location in Assam, India Asharikandi (India)
- Coordinates: 26°6′4″N 89°59′14″E
- Country: India
- State: Assam
- District: Dhubri

Government
  - Type: Panchayati raj (India)
  - Body: Gram panchayat

Population (2001)
  - Total: 1,872

Languages
  - Official: Assamese
- Time zone: UTC+5:30 (IST)
- PIN: 783331
- Telephone code: 91-3662
- Vehicle registration: AS
- Nearest city: Gauripur
- Lok Sabha constituency: Dhubri
- Vidhan Sabha constituency: Gauripur

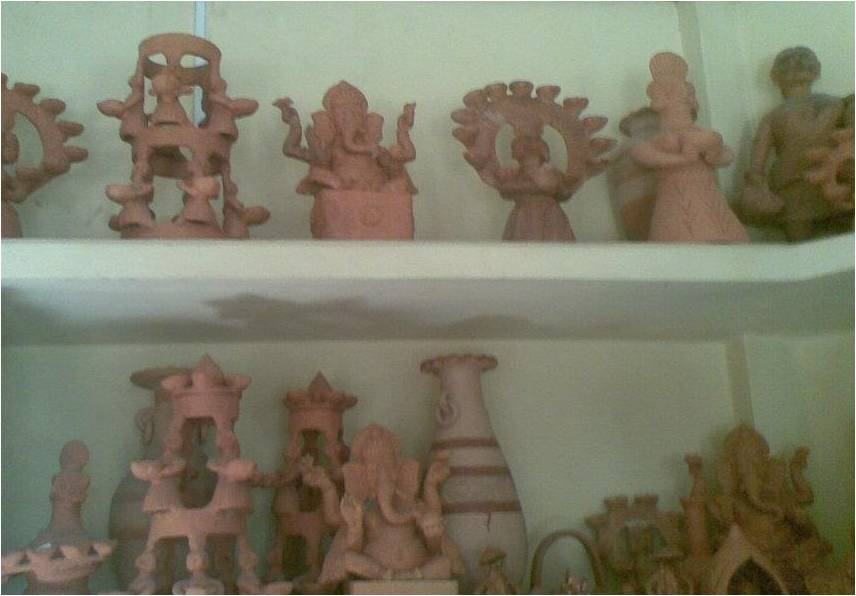
Some terracotta and pottery products of Asharikandi craft village

Asharikandi is a village in Debitola development block in Dhubri district of Assam, India. The village is located at ~14 kilometers distance east of Dhubri town and ~190 kilometers west of the state capital Guwahati and Borjhar Airport. According to 2001 India census, Asharikandi had a population of 1,872 in 305 households. Males constitute ~51% of the population and females ~49%. The village is known for its traditional crafts, Terracotta and Pottery. It is one of the largest clusters of Terracotta and Pottery in India.

== Historical background of the village and their crafts ==
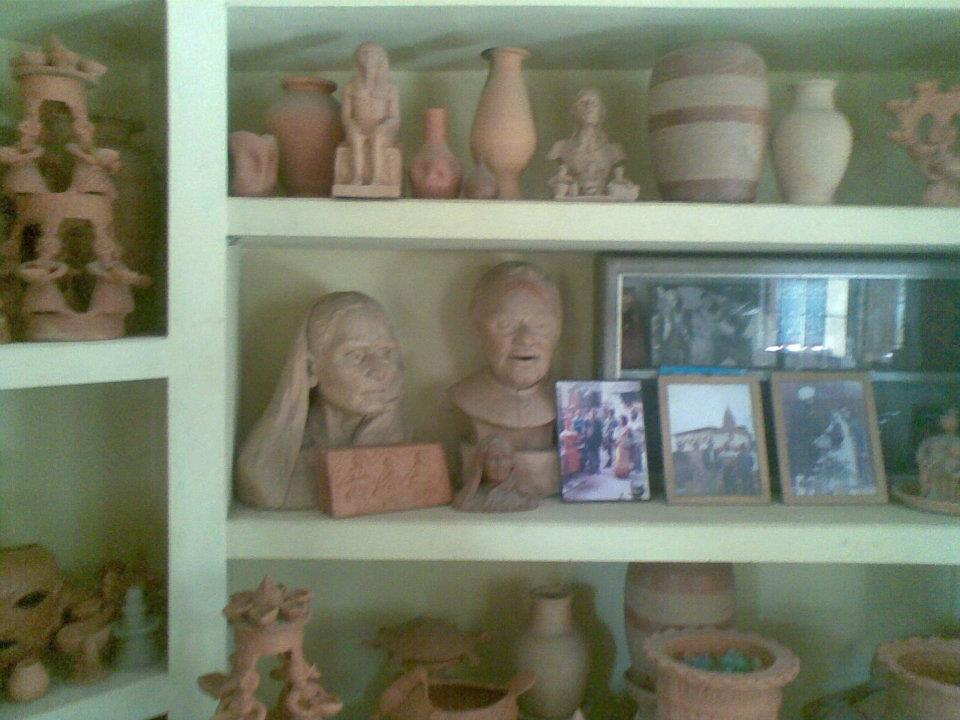
Some terracotta and pottery products of Asharikandi Terracotta Craft

It is said that the name Asharikandi was derived from the combination of two words ASHAR and KANDI. ASHAR or AXAR is the third month in Assamese Calendar and KANDI (Assamese term) means 'shedding tears'. During ASHAR, heavy sub-tropical rainfall creates flood in this low-lying area, which causes the dwellers of this place to shed tears out of misery. Especially the potters suffer a lot. Because they cannot make, dry up, burn their products and even cannot store safely their earlier produced items during the rainy season. But they selected the place due to some economically viable factors like the availability of raw materials, cheaper transportation facility, important strategic location, etc. The soil HIRAMATI is the soul of this craft. There are huge reserves of HIRAMATI in surrounding areas and the potters use the cheapest means of transport like boat as the village is just on the bank of the river Gadadhar, a tributary of the mighty Brahmaputra. For the purpose of selling the products, both the surface transport and water transport are availed. The closeness of the village to Brahmaputra has given a great an advantage for shipping network with the major cities.

== Geography ==
The village is situated at . It has an average elevation of 26 meters (85 feet). The river Gadadhar is flowing next to the village.

== Culture of the village ==
Originally, in early 19th century, a cluster of families of pottery community migrated from East Bengal (now Bangladesh) to Asharikandi and maintained their profession with innovation. Thus the Assamese terracotta art and culture took its birth at Asharikandi through a few cluster of pottery families. Today more than 80% families of this village are engaged in this ethnic art (handicraft) and pass their life after selling the terracotta items in the national and international markets. Traditionally most of these families belong to 'Paul' community of Bengali ethnicity. In Assam 'Paul' means Kumar (that is, potter). These days Dhubri district has acquired a pivotal position in the terracotta and pottery markets in India and abroad.

== Prominent artisans in the village ==
Among the numerous artisans of Asharikandi cluster, late Sarala Bala Devi, who bagged the national award on Terracotta craft in 1982 for her innovative masterpiece - HATIMA doll, a lovely female figure with a child on her lap - brought name and fame to the craft village. Dhirendra Nath Paul, a son of Sarala Bala Devi, is nationally and internationally acclaimed master craftsman on Terracotta. Mahadev Paul is a craftsmen of this cluster. He bagged the state award on Terracotta for his masterpiece Ganesh. Gokul Paul and Ashwini Paul are some young upcoming talents of this cluster.

== Present status and Government initiatives ==
Considering the tourism potential of this craft village, the Government of Assam has declared the village as a model village and brought under its rural tourism projects. NECARDO (North East Craft And Rural Development Organisation), an NGO, has been working for the revival of the craft and socio-economic development of the craftspersons. NECARDO is also implementing a United Nations Development Project (UNDP) for the promotion of terracotta art and culture since 2006.
