= Dhubri district =

- District of Assam
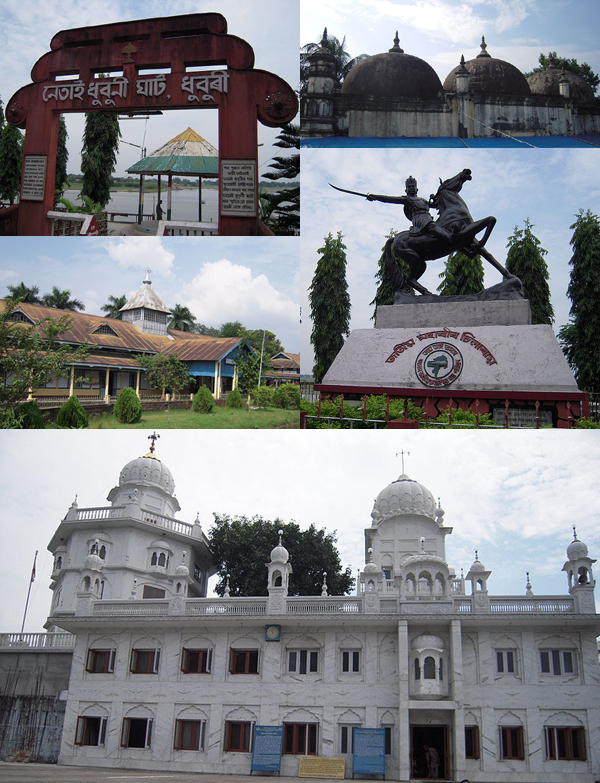
- (Clockwise from top) Netai Dhubunir Ghat, Historical Panbari Mosque, Chilarai statue at Dhubri town, Sri Guru Tegh Bahadur Sahib Gurdwara, and Bholanath College
- Interactive map of Dhubri district
- Country: India
- State: Assam
- Division: Lower Assam
- Headquarters: Dhubri

Government
  - District Commissioner: Dibakar Nath, IAS
  - Superintendent of Police: Navin Singh, APS
  - Lok Sabha constituencies: Dhubri (shared with South Salmara-Mankachar District, Goalpara district)
  - Vidhan Sabha constituencies: Dhubri, Gauripur, Golakganj, Bilasipara West, Bilasipara East

Area
  - Total: 1,608 km^{2} (621 sq mi)

Population (2011)
  - Total: 1,394,144
  - Density: 867.0/km^{2} (2,246/sq mi)
- Demonym: Dhubrian
- Time zone: UTC+05:30 (IST)
- ISO 3166 code: IN-AS-DB
- Website: https://dhubri.assam.gov.in/

Dhubri district (/ˈdʊbri/) is an administrative district in the Indian state of Assam. Included within the Kamatapur Autonomous Council, the district headquarters are located at Dhubri city which is situated ~290 km from Guwahati. This was also the headquarters of erstwhile undivided Goalpara district which was created in 1876 by the British government. In 1983, Goalpara district was divided into four districts and Dhubri is one among those. Dhubri district is one among the many Muslim-majority districts of Assam. In 2016, Dhubri was divided again to form South Salmara-Mankachar District.

As of 2011 it is the second most populous district of Assam (out of 27), after Nagaon.

== Etymology ==
The name Dhubri is derived from a story of Padma Purana of Behula-Lakhindar, where the main character of the story, who is called Behula during the period as the person had taken the path she followed to make a devoted visit to her dead husband going to the still living Lakhindar. Behula arrived at the bank of Brahmaputra called Netai. She had worked for the heaven gods such as Shiv, Partbati and others, and washed her clothes on a big stone at the bank of the Brahmaputra river called "Netai Dhubunir Ghat".

== History ==
Historical population
Year	Pop.	±% p.a.
1901	191,356	—
1911	248,711	+2.66%
1921	315,668	+2.41%
1931	365,409	+1.47%
1941	419,601	+1.39%
1951	458,422	+0.89%
1961	584,811	+2.46%
1971	818,103	+3.41%
1991	1,265,706	+2.21%
2001	1,566,396	+2.15%
2011	1,949,258	+2.21%

In the past, the gateway of western Assam was a meeting place of diverse racial groups which mingled together and formed a unique cultural heritage and historical background. The growth of blended culture in this region, particularly in the areas of language, art and religion is due to the continuous process of assimilation of various races, castes, and creeds of local people, invaders, and migrated people.

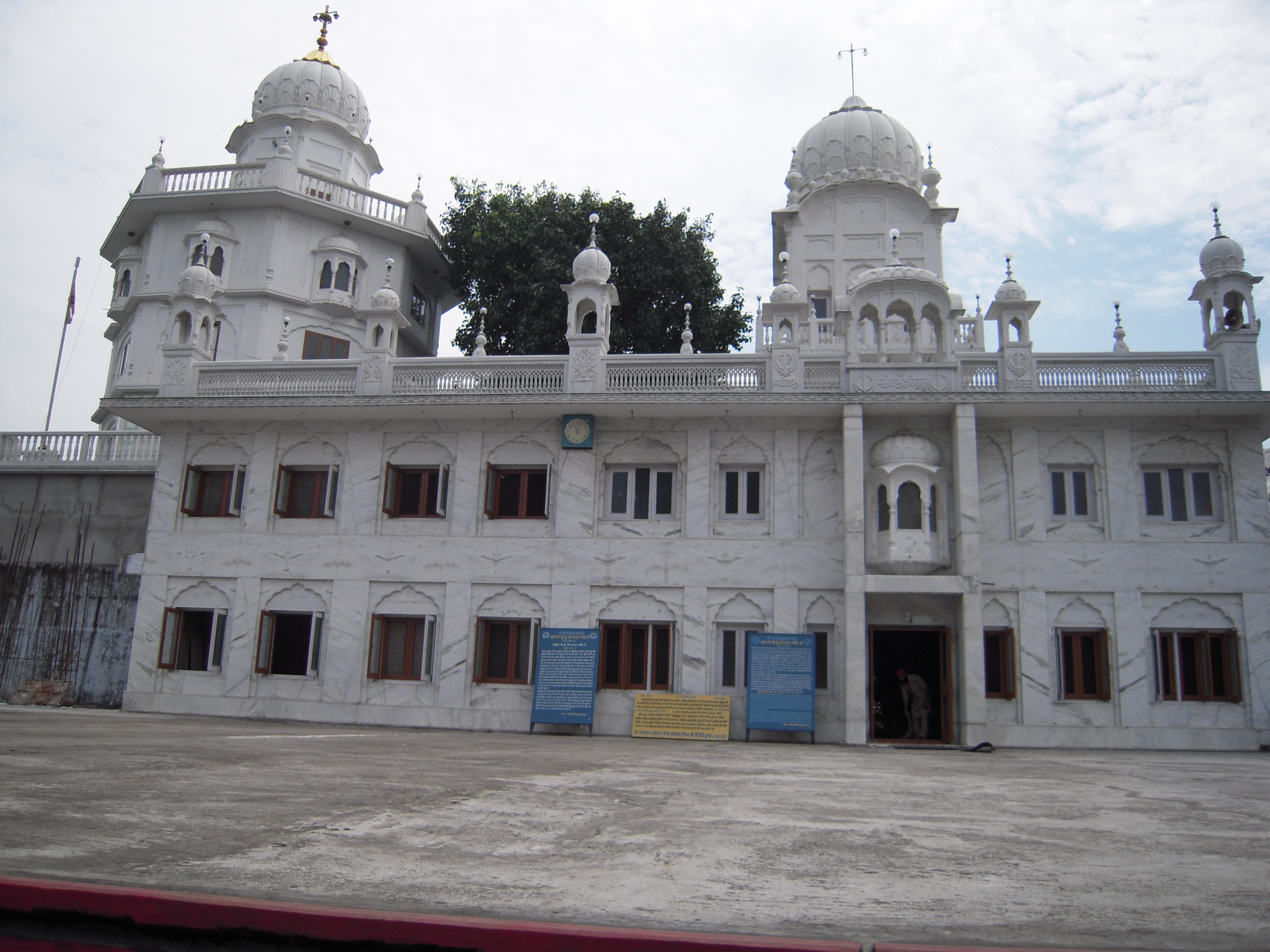
Gurdwara Sri Guru Tegh Bahadur Sahib at Dhubri

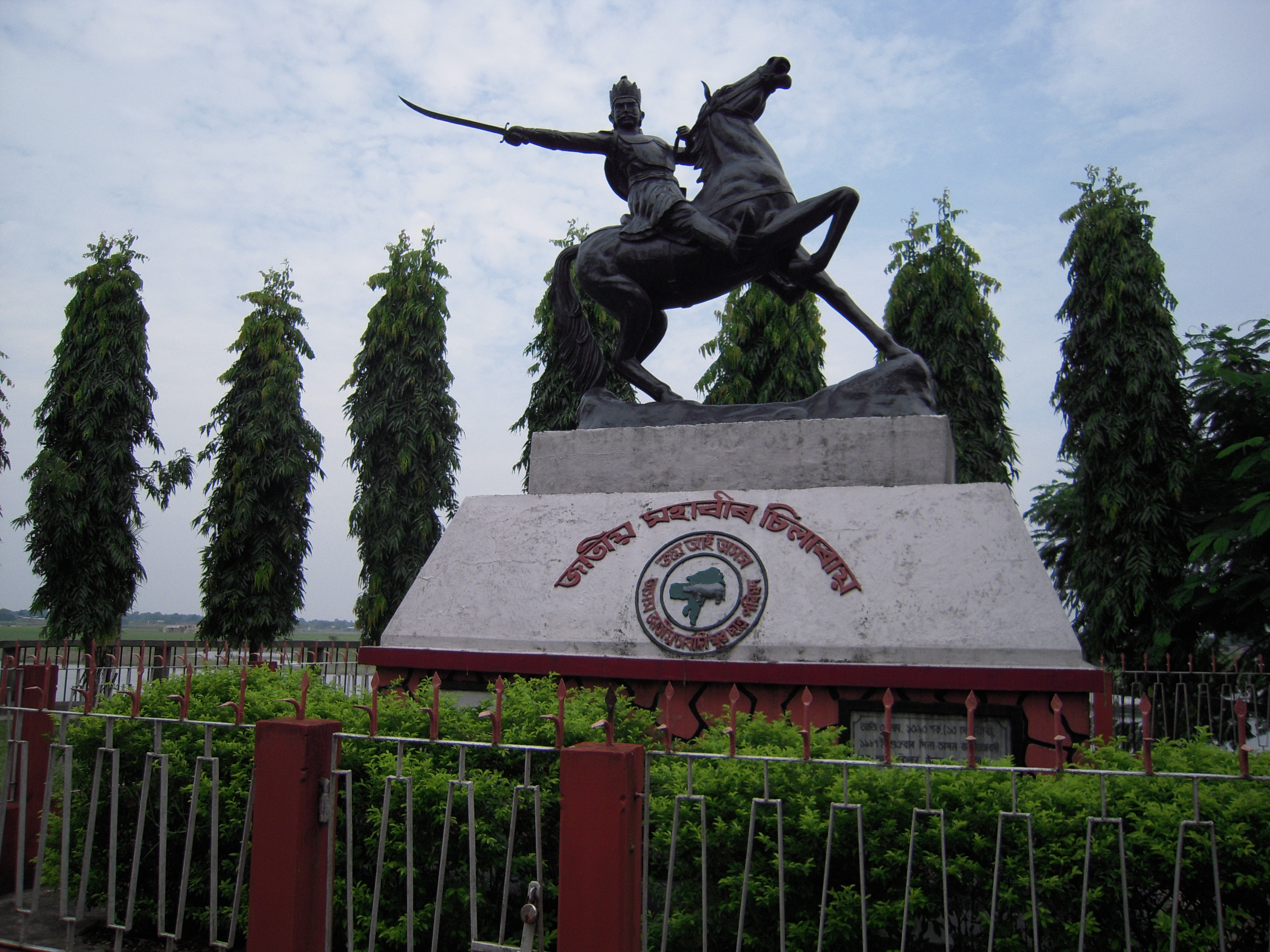
Chilarai statue at Dhubri Town

In 1669 C.E., the Kacchwaha Rajput Mirza Raja Ram Singh I of Amber was deputed by Emperor Aurangzeb to crush a rebellion by the Ahom king Chakradhwaj Singha. But Assam was a difficult country for such an operation and Raja Ram Singh requested Guru Teg Bahadur (Punjabi: ਗੁਰੂ ਤੇਗ਼ ਬਹਾਦੁਰ, Hindi: गुरू तेग़ बहादुर) to accompany him. Guru's role was proved to be much more crucial than his mere presence. This operation was actually a punishment for Ram Singh because it was from his custody that Shivaji and his son had escaped, a few years earlier.

== Sites ==
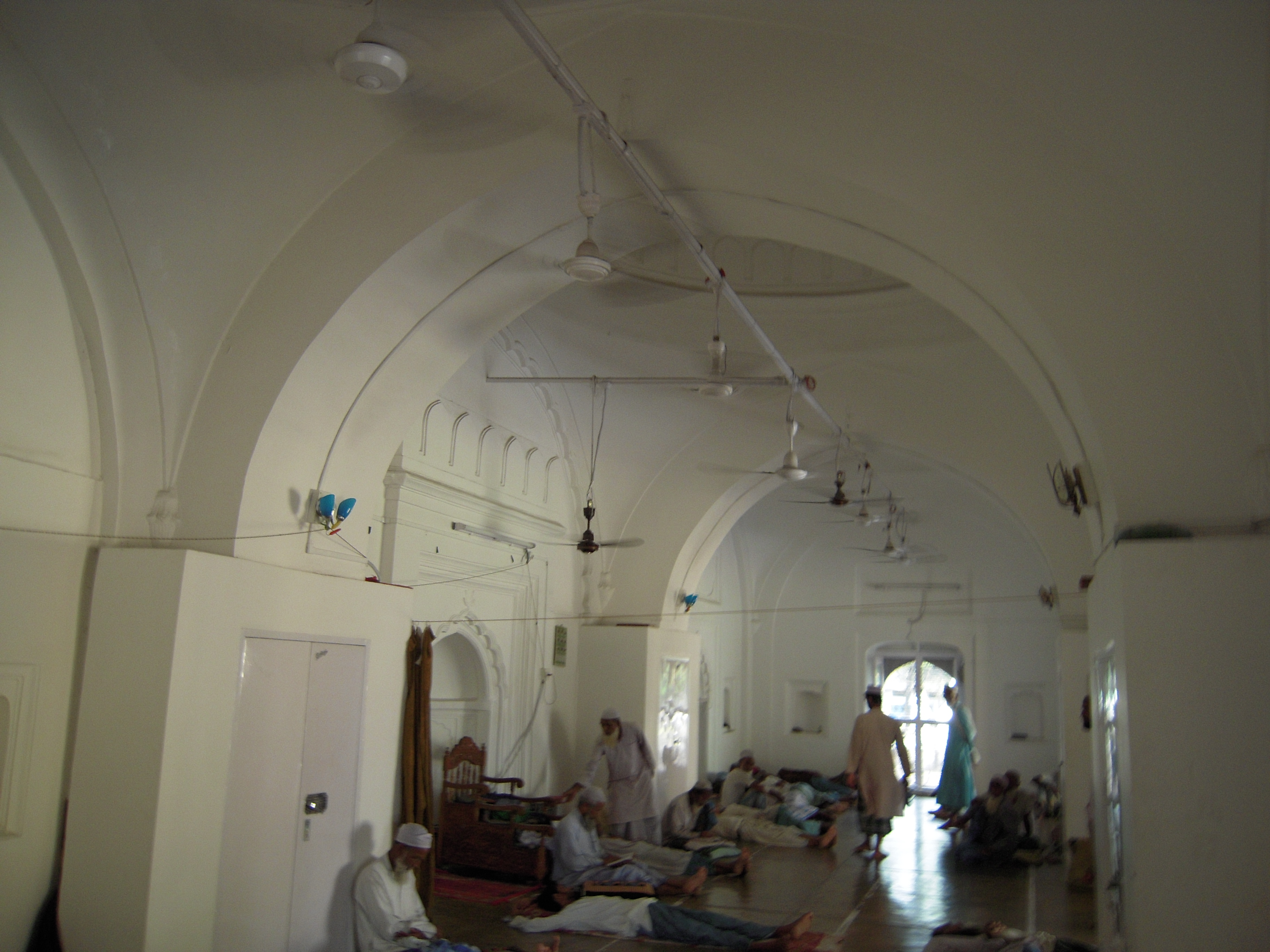
Inside look of Historic Panbari Mosque at Dhubri

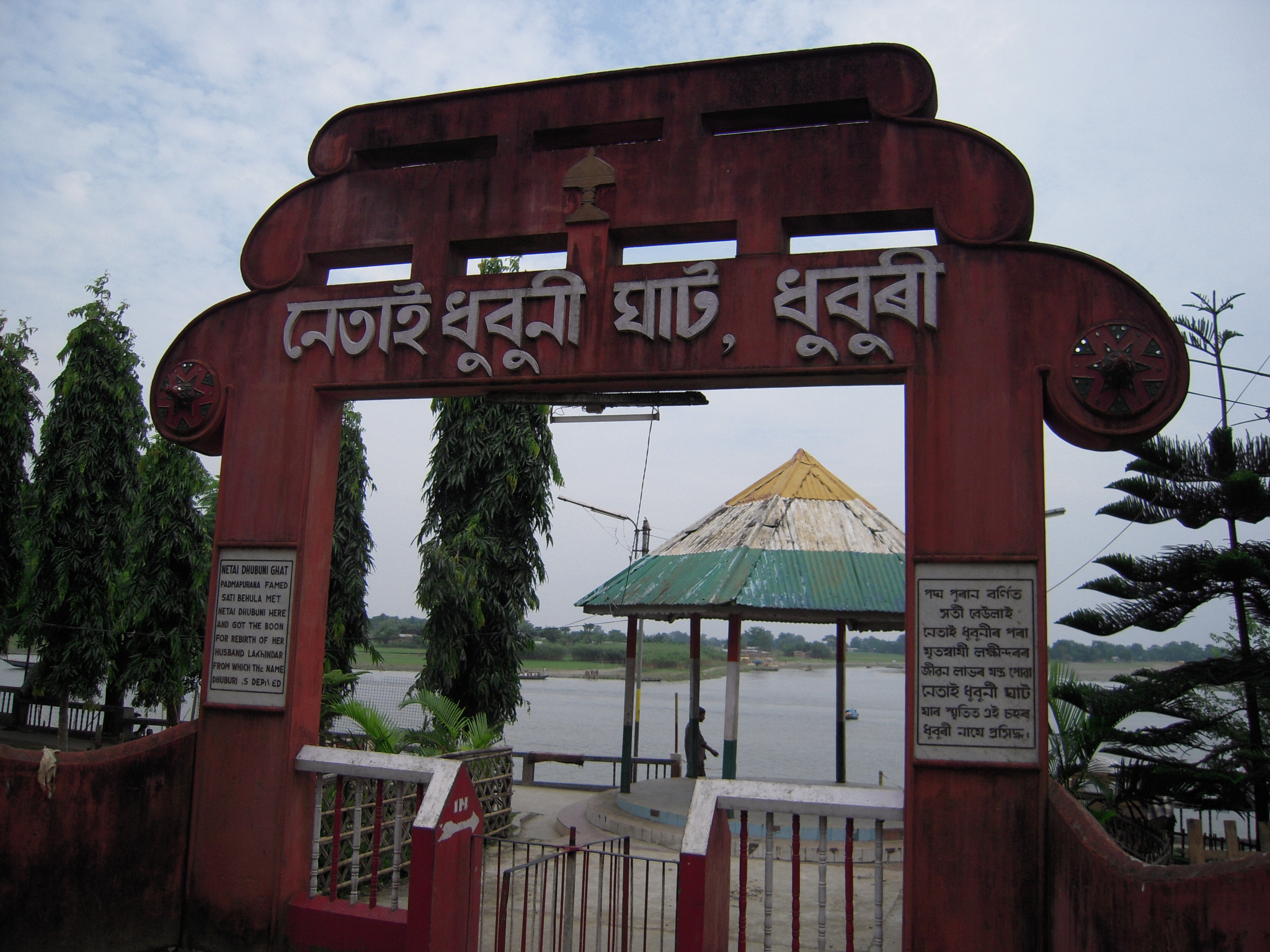
Historic Netai Dhubunir Ghat at Dhubri

The historic Panbari Mosque is situated on the National Highway 31, about 25 km east from Dhubri town, near Panbari and Rangamati, and is considered to be the oldest mosque in the Indian state of Assam. The 15th to 17th century three-domed mosque is believed to have either been built under the reign of Hussain Shah (1493-1519) or during Mir Jumla's invasion of Assam in 1662-63 under the Mughal Emperor Aurangzeb. This mosque was used as a prayer hall by the Mughal Muslim soldiers. There is also an Idgah and a deep well which were also probably constructed during that period. Panbari "Pahar", thus is known as the holy seat of the Muslims in Assam. It is said that about 200 years ago, the local people of this place found this mosque in Panbari "Pahar" under the thick foliage. They cleaned this place and started to offer Namaz there. During Eid this mosque bears a special look. Thousands of people from different parts of the country visit this mosque. Not only the people from India but also from the United Kingdom and Japan visit this place. But the masjid is fast losing its glory due to lack of proper maintenance.

Panchpeer Dargah It is Mazar Sharif of five Sufi Saints who accompanied Raja Ram Singh during the times of the Mughal conflict with the Ahom Regime of Assam.

The modern-day Dhubri district was created on 1 July 1983 when it was split off from Goalpara district.

== Geography ==
Dhubri district occupies an area of 2,838 square kilometres (1,096 sq mi), comparatively equivalent to Russia's Zemlya Georga.

Dhubri District is bounded both by interstate and international borders: West Bengal and Bangladesh in the west; Goalpara and Bogaigoan district of Assam and Garo Hills district of Meghalaya in the east; Kokrajhar district in the north; and Bangladesh and state of Meghalaya in the south. The district is located on the globe between 89.42 and 90.12 degree east longitude and 26.22 to 25.28 degree north latitude and situated at 30 meters above the sea level on an average. General topography of Dhubri district is plain with patches of small hillocks like Tokorabandha, Dudhnath, Chandardinga, Boukuamari, Boropahar, Chakrasila, etc. All these are situated in the north eastern part of the district. Mighty river Brahmaputra is flowing through this district from east to west with its tributaries like Champabati, Gourang, Gadadhar, Gangadhar, Tipkai, Sankosh, Silai, Jinjiram, etc. The average annual rainfall of the district is 2,916 mm.

== Economy ==
Dhubri District is primarily dependent on agricultural and forest products. The main source of income is paddy (both winter and autumn) with surplus production. Jute and mustard seed occupy the major share of cash crops. Wheat, maize, pulses and sugar cane are also grown moderately. From forest, mainly timber and bamboo add to the income, though boulders and sand are also available. Fish, milk, meat, and eggs have small contribution to the economy. Currently three tea gardens, whose contribution to the district economy is almost negligible, cover an area of 1362.33 hectares. Land revenue collection is minimal, whereas tax from check gates and excise duty occupy much of the government exchequer. Devoid of major industrial production, the district uses more funds for administration, development, and welfare works than it provides.

Its rich natural wealth is yet to be explored and some believe that proper utilisation of natural resources could provide a boost for the struggling economy.

Some important production and earnings are given below:

2000-2001
Particular	Production (in tonnes)	Revenue (Rs.)
Rice	15,000 (Approx)	
Forest		40,00000.00 (Approx)
Excise		1,70,80,742.00
Sales Tax		10,13,36,902.00
Total		

Dhubri has the capability to become the economic hub of Assam. Recent developments in a Medical College proposal can be a game changer for the district. People can live in good health with access to many major facilities. An industrial revolution would be a major pull over to increase the quality of life of people in the state. The area is already equipped with infrastructure that can provide the base for further development. The dense population of Dhubri can help in lowering labour costs, and the major need for raw materials can be fulfilled with Assam and its neighbouring states.

== Divisions ==
At present there are two sub-divisions: Dhubri (Sadar) and Bilasipara.

The district has 8 revenue circles and 7 tahsils. It has 8 police stations and 4 basic towns.

There are five Assam Legislative Assembly constituencies in this district: Dhubri, Gauripur, Golakganj, Bilasipara West, and Bilasipara East. All five are in the Dhubri Lok Sabha constituency.

== Transport ==
=== Airway ===
Rupshi in Kokrajhar district is the nearest airport in Dhubri which is about 15 km away from the town. It was constructed during World War II by the British Govt. mainly for military purposes. Till 1983, Indian Airlines and some private commercial flights operated regularly between Calcutta, Guwahati. Now it has restarted under UDAAN. There are direct flights between Rupsi Guwahati and Kolkata 4 days a week.

=== Waterway ===
The town had a very busy river port on the bank of the Brahmaputra, which was used as an international trade centre with the neighbouring countries, specially in British era. At present, the port is lying idle.

=== Railway ===
The importance of the Railway station and the MG line was also decreased since 1947, when the direct line to Calcutta was snapped as it ran through erstwhile East Pakistan (now Bangladesh). The train service has newly started on 2010 again, and it is functioning smoothly. However the train services running from the Dhubri railway station are taking a new route from Dhubri to Kamakhya and Guwahati Junction. Trains originating from Dhubri station are, Dhubri-Silghat (Rajya Rani Express), Dhubri - Siliguri (Inter City Express) and Dhubri Fakiragram passenger.

=== Road ===
NH-31(New NH-17) passes through Dhubri district and is one of the base root to connect Assam with West Bengal and other states. Toll comes near the Assam and West Bengal border Boxirhat (Dhubri-Dist.).

== Demographics ==
According to the 2011 census Dhubri district has a population of 1,949,258, roughly equal to the nation of Lesotho or the US state of West Virginia. This gives it a ranking of 240th in India (out of a total of 640). The district has a population density of 1,171 inhabitants per square kilometre (3,030/sq mi). Its population growth rate over the decade 2001–2011 was 24.4%. Dhubri has a sex ratio of 952 females for every 1000 males, and a literacy rate of 59.36%.

With the bifurcation, the residual district has a population of 1,394,144, of which 177,539 (12.73%) live in urban areas. Dhubri has a sex ratio of 948 females per 1000 males. Scheduled Castes and Scheduled Tribes make up 62,628 (4.49%) and 2,300 (0.16%) of the population respectively.

=== Religion ===
Religion in Dhubri district (2011)
Religion	Percent
Islam	73.49%
Hinduism	26.07%
Other or not stated	0.44%

After bifurcation, the Muslims are 73.49% of the population with Hindus constituting 26.07%.

=== Languages ===
Languages spoken in Dhubri district (2011)
1. Assamese (38.0%)
2. 'Other' Assamese (31.1%)
3. Bengali (19.0%)
4. Rajbongshi (5.65%)
5. Hindi (2.15%)

At the time of the 2011 census, 37.97% of the population spoke Assamese, 18.98% Bengali, 5.65% Rajbongshi, 2.15% Hindi. 31.12% of the population recorded their language as 'Others' under Assamese, and 0.91% as 'Others' under Bengali.

The district has many East Bengal origin Muslims who often consider their mother tongue to be a dialect of Assamese and not that of Bengali, and therefore many reported it as Assamese during census enumeration. If these people are considered as Bengali speakers, then estimated numbers of Bengali speaking population would be higher.

== Culture ==
=== Terracotta and pottery craft ===
Dhubri district of Assam have occupied a pivotal position in terracotta market of the world. The Assam's terracotta art and culture mainly took its birth at Asharikandi, a small village near Gauripur town in Dhubri district. More than 80% families of this craft village are engaged in this ethnic based art (handicraft) and pass their life after selling these terracotta products in the national and international markets.

=== Places of interest ===
The main places of interest in Dhubri district include Rangamati or Panbari Mosque, the oldest mosque in entire northeast region of India, Chakrashila Wildlife Sanctuary, Matiabag Palace, Gurdwara Sri Guru Tegh Bahadur Sahib, Mahamaya Dham, Garden and Panchpeer Dargah.

This place is known for the Sikh Gurdwara namely Gurdwara Damdama Sahib or Thara Sahib which was constructed in memory of visit of First Sikh Guru Nanak Dev (Punjabi: ਗੁਰੂ ਨਾਨਕ, Hindi: गुरु नानक, Urdu: گرونانک Guru Nānak) and later it was followed by visit of Ninth guru, Guru Tegh Bahadur (Punjabi: ਗੁਰੂ ਤੇਗ਼ ਬਹਾਦੁਰ, Hindi: गुरू तेग़ बहादुर) and the Gurdwara is named as Gurdwara Sri Guru Tegh Bahadur Sahib. Hence, it has great importance for Sikh community.

Main towns in Dhubri district are Dhubri, Gauripur, Bilasipara, Golakganj, Tamarhat, Sapatgram, Chapar, Hatsingimari, Mankachar, Agomani etc.

== Flora and fauna ==
On 14 July 1994, a virgin forest patch of Dhubri District of Assam was declared as a wildlife sanctuary by the gazette notification of the Assam government. This sanctuary has been named as "Chakrashila Wildlife Sanctuary". It is the youngest sanctuary of North East India having an area of 11,260.00 acres (45.5676 km^{2}). Chakrasila is unique because of the presence of golden langur (Presbytis geei) which is found nowhere else except along the Assam and Bhutan border. Besides, the virgin forest of Chakrasila Wildlife Sanctuary is endowed with rare specimens of trees, shrubs, medicinal plants, mammals, reptiles and birds and insects.

Geographical location of the Chakrasila Wildlife Sanctuary is in the latitude 26° 15′ to 26° 26′ N and longitude 90° 15′ to 90° 20′ E. It is in the District of Dhubri, the westernmost region of Assam. It is 68 km from the district headquarters Dhubri and 219 km from the Borjhar Airport of Guwahati City.

There are several small springs for quenching the thirst of the wild animals of this hilly forest. But the two major perennial springs in the sanctuary are howhowi Jhora and Bamuni Jhora, which flow over the rocks, sparkling and spattering throughout the year, adding to the scenery of the sanctuary.

Climatic conditions of Chakrasila Wildlife Sanctuary is like that of temperate zone with dry winter and hot summer followed by heavy rains. Annual rainfall is 200 to 400 cm. Soil is azonal, forestlike and hilly. temperature throughout the year generally varies between 8 °C and 30 °C.

The diverse eco-systems of Chakrasila present a model habitat diversity. They support various mammalian species such as the tiger, leopard, golden langur and leopard cat. Other species such as the gaur, mongoose, porcupine, pangoline, flying squirrel and civet cat also are present. Chakrasila has a wide variety of avifauna.

The two internationally recognised wetlands namely Dhir and Deeplai have not been yet taken inside the declared boundary of the sanctuary. But they are a part of the Chakrasila eco-system. It is expected that in due course they will be included within the sanctuary.

== Education ==
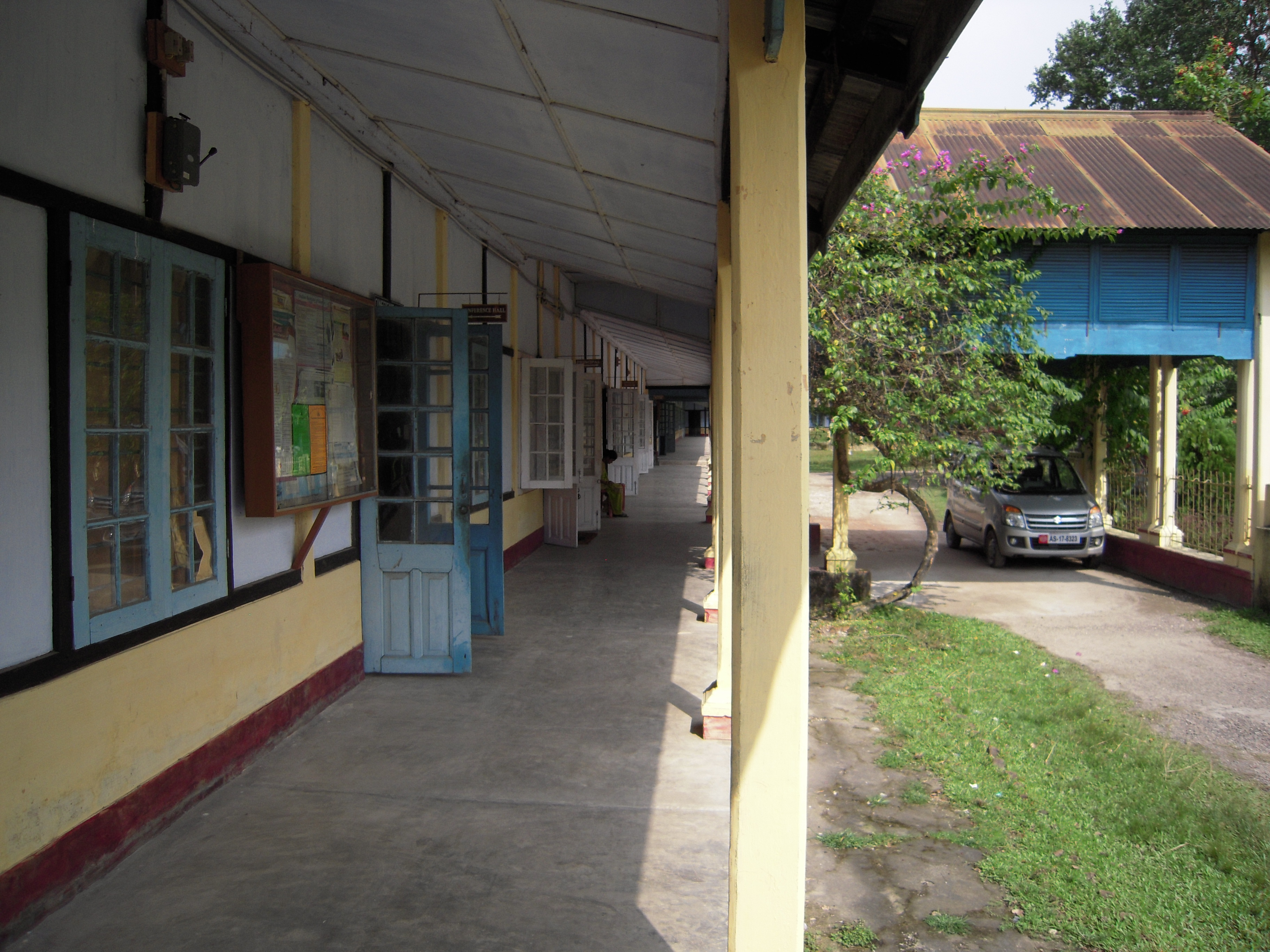
Bhola Nath College at Dhubri

At present the district houses 15 colleges for higher education. B. N. College, Dhubri (estd. 1946) at Dhubri is one of the oldest institutes in Assam. Sapatgram College situated in Sapatgram town is imparts degree BA and certificates HSSLC in Art's stream Bilasipara College situated in bilasipara town also imparts degrees (BA and BSc) and certificates (HSSLC) in the science and arts streams. Ratnapeeth College of Chapar is another prominent college of the district. The Government Boys Higher secondary School and Bidyapara Boys' Higher secondary school are the two important schools of Dhubri town and the oldest too. Happy Convent School is also one of the best schools affiliated by CBSE.

One Industrial Training Institute and some 30 number of private run computer institutes are there. Most prominent among these is COLLEGE OF ADVANCED TECHNICAL STUDIES popularly called CATS situated at G T B Road, Opposite to Students' Library, Dhubri. This institute is providing coaching and training facilities for Bachelor of Computer Application [BCA] course along with both short term and long term courses on Computer.

More than hundred high and higher secondary schools are also imparting education to the people of the district. ASIAN MISSION INSTITUTE a vocational training centre is imparting education to the people.

== Prominent personalities from Dhubri District ==
- Pramathesh Barua, One of the pioneers of Indian Cinema. Directed and acted in many films in the pre-independence era.
- Pratima Barua Pandey, The Queen of folk music. She is a legend of Goalpariya folk music.
- Abdul Hamid Khan Bhashani, Co-founder of Awami League, Peasant Leader
- Rebati Mohan Dutta Choudhury, Sahitya Akademy winner novelist.
- Kalicharan Brahma, a 20th-century social and religious reformer of Bodo society.
- Sarat Chandra Sinha, Ex Chief Minister of Assam. He was known for his simplicity and honesty.
- Parbati Barua, Internationally acclaimed "Queen of the Elephant".
- Abdul Hamid, former MP. Represented Dhubri MP Constituency for three times.
- Nazrul Hoque, Dhubri MLA
- Javed Zaman, First cricketer from Assam to play for India A team. A veteran Ranji player for Assam and Railways.
- B. C. Sanyal was a famous Indian painter who have been born and brought up in Dhubri.
- Tapas Sen ( 11 September 1924 – 28 June 2006) was a noted Indian stage lighting designer who was born and brought up in Dhubri.
- Priyadarshini Chatterjee, is an Indian model and beauty pageant titleholder who was crowned Femina Miss India World in 2016. She represented India at the Miss World 2016 pageant. She is the first Indian Bengali women from Dhubri district to represent India at Miss World.
- Saifuddin Ahmed Born in Assam, Bangladeshi Actor.
