= Gurdwara Sri Guru Tegh Bahadur Sahib =

Gurdwara in Assam, India

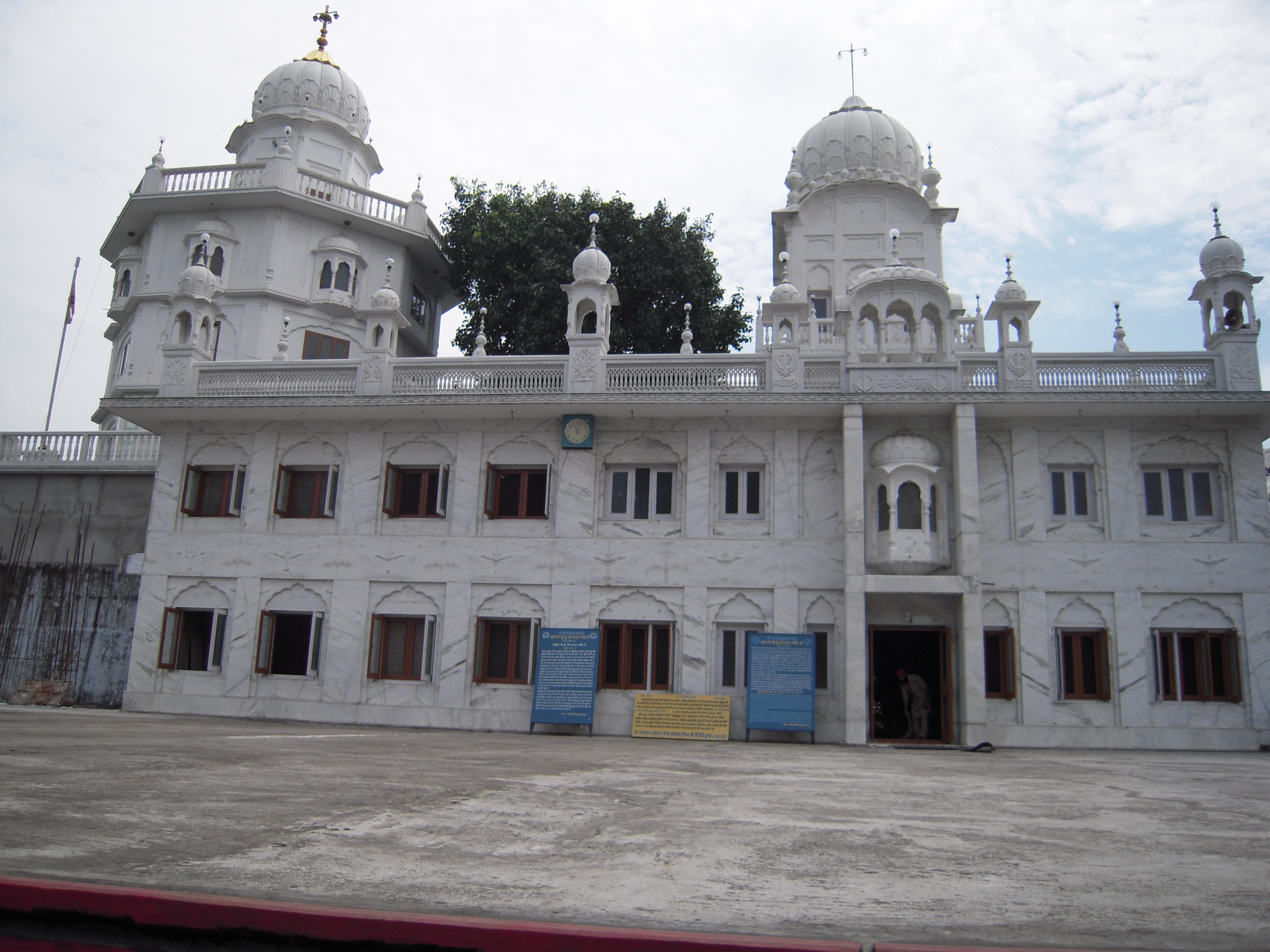
- Central building of Gurdwara Sri Guru Tegh Bahadur Sahib

Religion
- Affiliation: Sikhism

Location
- Location: Dhubri, Assam, India
- Interactive map of Gurdwara Sri Guru Tegh Bahadur Sahib

Website
- https://www.gurudwaradhubrisahib.com

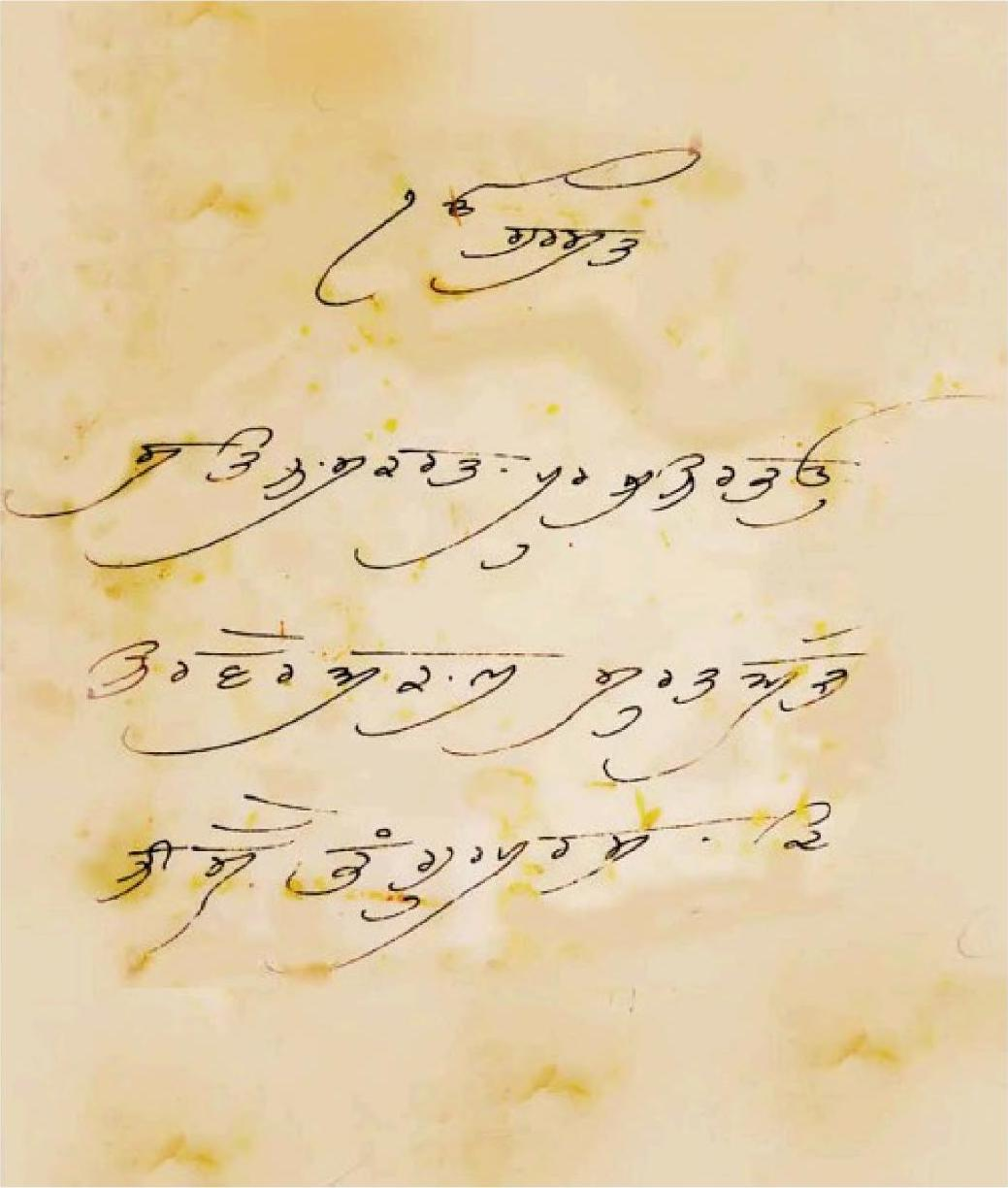
Folio consisting of the Mul Mantar from a historical Guru Granth Sahib manuscript preserved at Gurdwara Sri Guru Tegh Bahadur Sahib in Dhubri, Assam, India

Gurdwara Sri Guru Tegh Bahadur Sahib is the gurdwara (house of worship for Sikhs) in Dhubri town on the bank of the Brahmaputra River in Assam, India. The first Sikh guru, Guru Nanak Dev, visited this place in 1505 AD and met Srimanta Sankardeva on his way when he traveled from Dhaka to Assam. Later, the 9th Guru Teg Bahadur came to this place and established this Gurdwara during the 17th century. It is known locally as Dumdume Gurdwara.

== History ==
Guru Tegh Bahadur departed from Dhaka in Bengal and visited Dhubri in Assam in late 1669 as per The Encyclopedia of Sikhism. Assam is traditionally associated with witchcraft in Indic lore, reflected in hagiographical accounts of magical occurrences during Guru Nanak and Bhai Mardana's travel to the region of Kamarupa. Sikh accounts of the ninth Sikh guru's visit also contain magical elements. When arriving at Dhubri, Sikh lore believes the guru held up on the right-bank of the Brahmaputra river, where a washerwoman attempt to harm the guru using witchcraft and threw large trees and rocks at him, which failed to harm the guru. When her antics failed, she became a devotee of the guru. The gurdwara is believed to have been established by the ninth guru during his travels in Assam and some Sikhs of his retinue stayed behind to maintain it. The shrine had an akhara associated with it. During the Dundiya rebellion of the early 1790s, the gurdwara harboured Sikh and Punjabi militiamen in the barkandaze forces.

Former Indian President Gyani Zail Singh visited the shrine in 1983.

The detailed historical information of the Gurudwara can be found here.

== Gallery ==
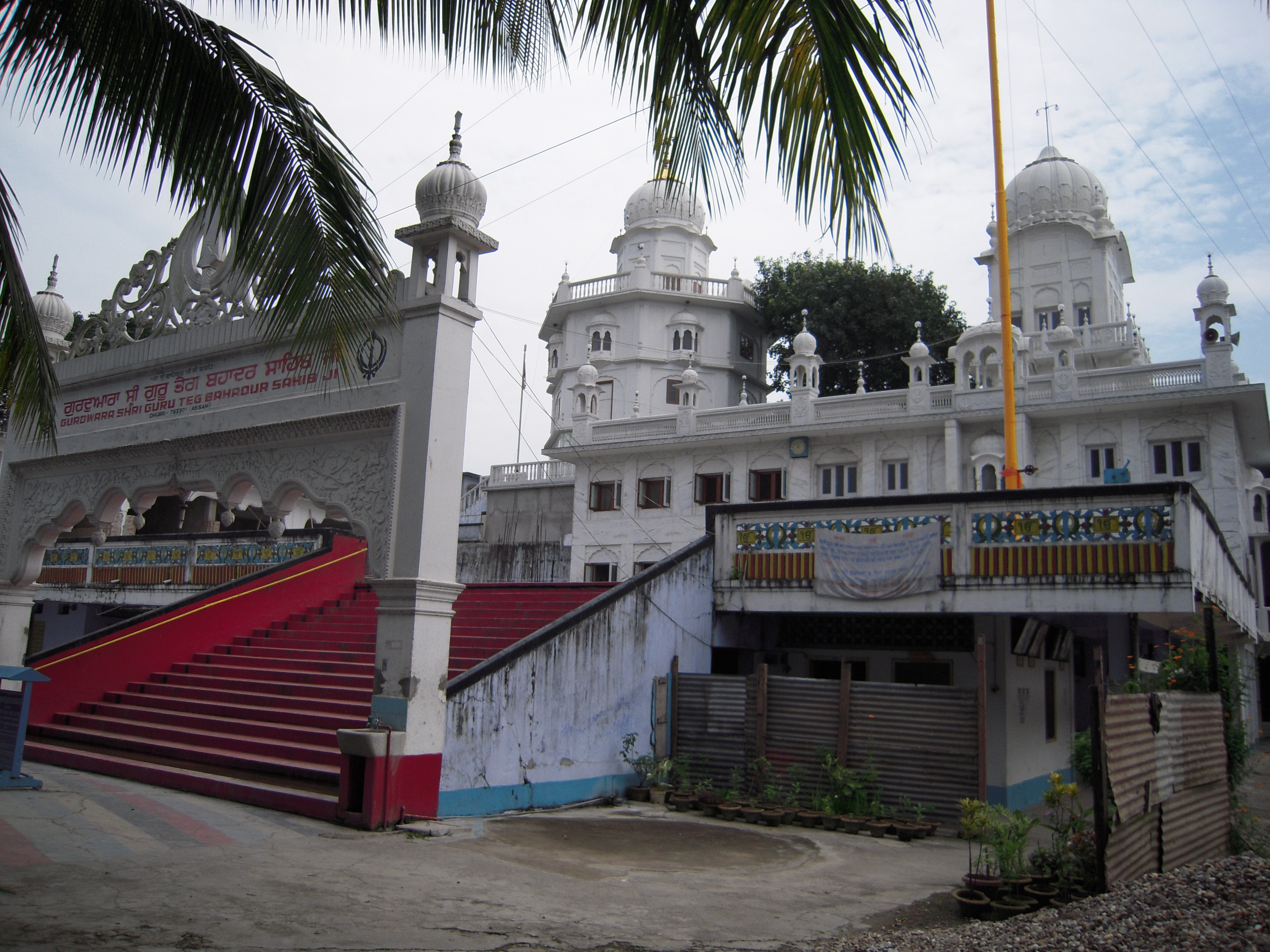
view from Main Gate

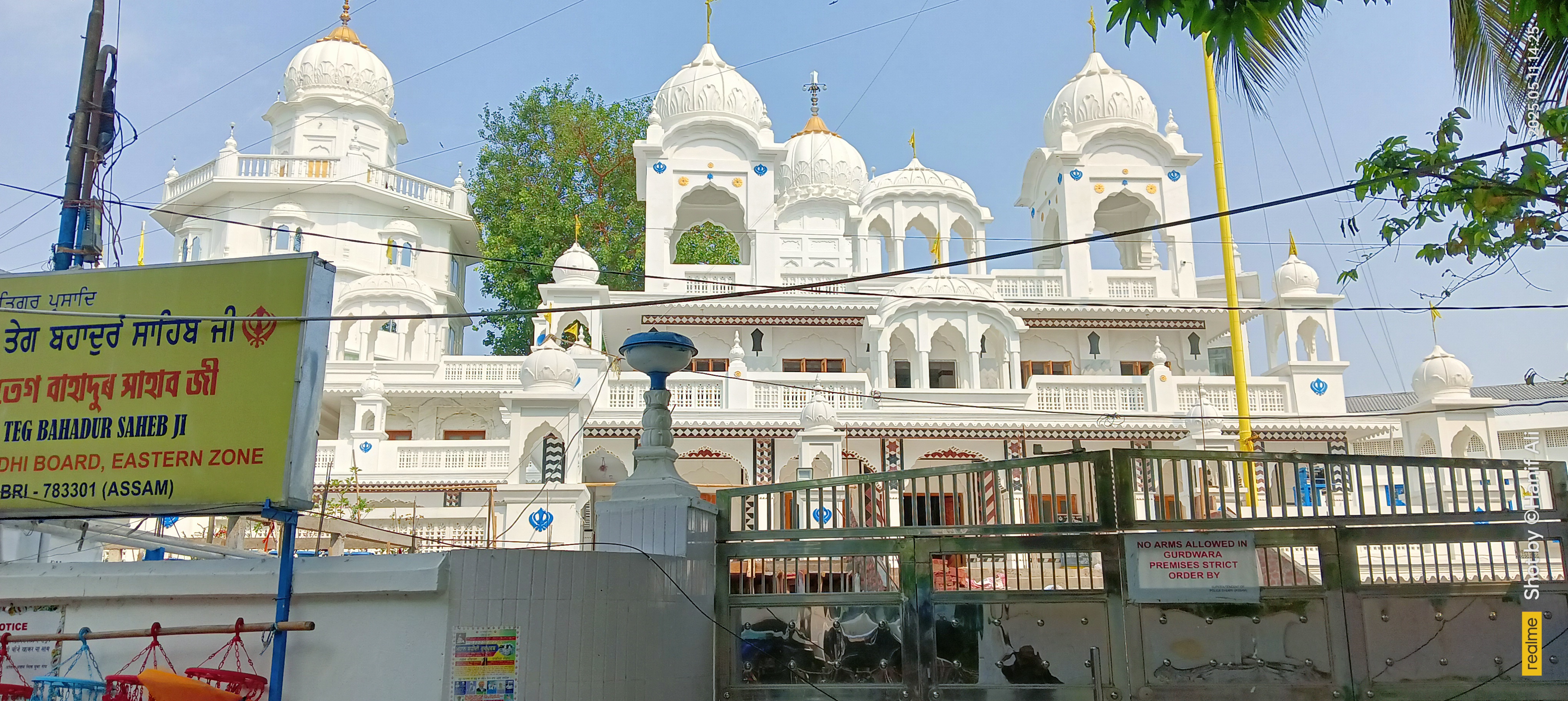
Front View
