= Jiadhal River =

River in India

Jiadhal River Kumotiya River
- Native name: জিয়াধল নদী (Assamese)

Location
- State: Assam

Physical characteristics
- Source: Sub-Himalayan mountains, West Siang district
  - location: Arunachal Pradesh
- Mouth: Subansiri River

Basin features
- Progression: Jiadhal River-Kumotiya River (Jiadhal takes new name)-Subansiri River-Brahmaputra River

The Jiadhal River is a northern sub-tributary of the Brahmaputra River in the Indian state of Assam. The river originates from the hills of Arunachal Pradesh. The Jiadhali river flows through the Dhemaji district and takes the name of Kumotiya River from Gogamukh.The river finally joins Subansiri river, a major tributary of Brahmaputra River. Jiadhal River is known as ‘Sorrow of Dhemaji’ for the heavy damage caused by annual flood and erosion.
