= Gabharu River =

River in India

- Location within Assam Location within India
- Native name: গাভৰু নদী (Assamese)

Location
- State: Assam
- District: Sonitpur District

Physical characteristics
- Source: Kalafangapo hill
  - location: West Kameng District, Arunachal Pradesh
  - coordinates: 26°59′42.0″N 92°27′28.4″E
- Mouth: Brahmaputra River
  - location: Gadharu Mukh, Chapari Gaon, Sonitpur District, Assam
  - coordinates: 26°38′18.2″N 92°37′14.1″E

Basin features
- Progression: Gabharu River - Brahmaputra River

The Gabharu River is a northern bank tributary of the Brahmaputra River in the Indian state of Assam. The Gabharu River originates in the Kalafangapo hills of Arunachal Pradesh in the West Kameng District and flows through Sonitpur district of Assam before its confluence with the Brahmaputra River at Gadharu Mukh (Chapari Gaon) of Sonitpur district. The Gabharu River consists of two right bank subtributaries known as Sonairupai River and Gelgeli River and Mora Depota River is the left bank sub tributary.
