= Dudhnoi River =

River in India

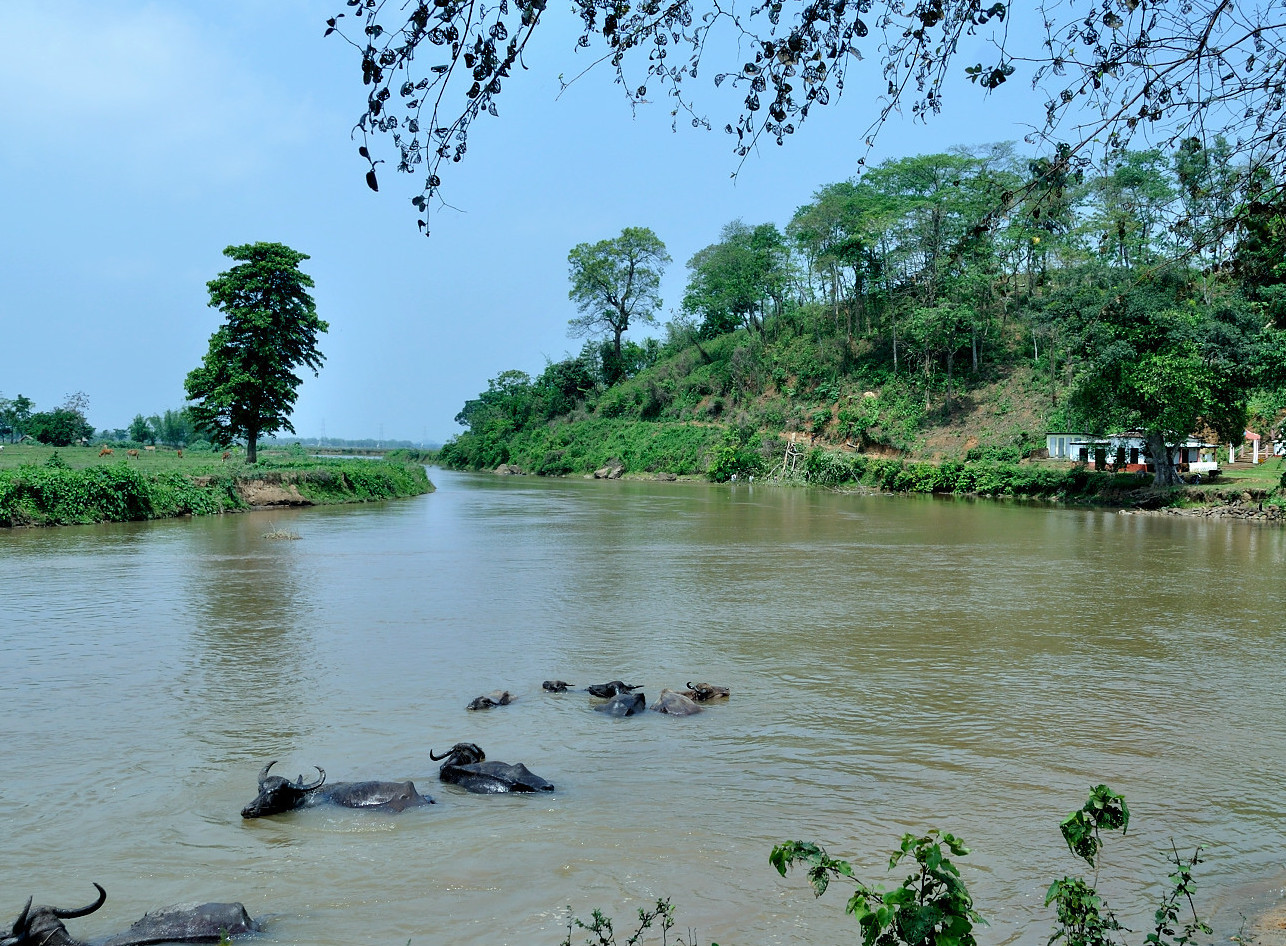
- Buffaloes taking bath in the Dudhnoi River at Goalpara

- Location within Assam Location within India
- Native name: দুধনৈ নদী (Assamese)

Location
- State: Meghalaya & Assam

Physical characteristics
- Source: East Garo Hills
  - location: Meghalaya
  - coordinates: 25°38′57.1″N 90°48′59.7″E
- Mouth: Mornoi River
  - coordinates: 26°04′30.1″N 90°45′16.8″E

Basin features
- Progression: Dudhnoi River - Krishnai River - Mornoi River - Brahmaputra River

The Dudhnoi River is a sub-tributary of the Brahmaputra River in the Indian state of Assam. The Dudhnoi River originates in the East Garo Hills of Meghalaya. The Dudhnoi River meets Krishnai River at Matia of Goalpara district and then flows as Mornoi River before its confluence with the Brahmaputra River. Floods in Goalpara district is dictated by the Dudhnoi river.
