= Krishnai River =

River in India

- Location within Assam Location within India
- Native name: কৃষ্ণাই নদী (Assamese)

Location
- State: Meghalaya & Assam

Physical characteristics
- Source: West Garo Hills
  - location: Meghalaya
  - coordinates: 25.6209436°N 90.3620221°E
- Mouth: Mornoi River
  - coordinates: 26°04′30.1″N 90°45′16.8″E

Basin features
- Progression: Krishnai River - Dudhnoi River – Mornoi River - Brahmaputra River

The Krishnai River is a sub-tributary of the Brahmaputra River in the Indian state of Assam. The Krishnai River originates in the West Garo Hills of Meghalaya. The Krishnai River meets Dudhnoi River at Matia of Goalpara district and then flows as Mornoi River before its confluence with the Brahmaputra River.
