= Abdul Hamid (Indian politician) =

Indian politician

Member of Parliament, Lok Sabha
- In office 10 October 1999 – 6 February 2004
- Constituency: Dhubri
- In office 10 March 1998 – 26 April 1999
- Constituency: Dhubri
- In office 1984–1989
- Constituency: Dhubri

Personal details
- Born: 2 January 1950 (age 76) Chapar, Dhubri, Assam, India
- Education: Master of Arts
- Alma mater: Bholanath College

Abdul Hamid (Bengali: আব্দুল হামিদ; born 2 January 1950) is a leader of Indian National Congress from Assam. He served as a member of the Lok Sabha representing Dhubri (Lok Sabha constituency). He was elected to the 8th, 12th and 13th Lok Sabha.
