= Sapatgram =

- City
- Location in Assam, India Sapatgram (India)
- Coordinates: 26.33°N 90.13°E
- Country: India
- State: Assam
- District: Dhubri

Government
  - Body: Sapatgram Municipality Board Area
- Elevation: 27 m (89 ft)

Population (2011)
  - Total: 12,163

Languages
  - Official: Assamese
- Time zone: UTC+5:30 (IST)
- Vehicle registration: AS

Sapatgram (IPA: ˈSapatgram) is a town and a municipality board area in Dhubri district in the Indian state of Assam.

== Geography ==
Sapatgram is located at 26.33°N 90.13°E. It has an average elevation of 27 metres (88 feet). It is on the River Sankosh.It is a border town in between Dhubri and Kokrajhar Districts of Assam. The distance between Dhubri and Sapatgram is 47.6 km.

== Demographics ==
Sapatgram is one of the oldest towns in Dhubri district.

According to the 2011 Census, it is a Class-IV town. The town area is 2.95 km^{2} = 4,123.1 inhabitants/km^{2}. The total population of the town as per 2011 census is 12,163. An average of (+03%) population growth was recorded between 2001 and 2011. Males constituted 51% of the population and females 49%. Sapatgram had an average literacy rate of 85%, higher than the national average of 59.5%. Male literacy was 88%, and female literacy was 78%. In Sapatgram, 10% of the population were under 6 years of age.

The town is inhabited by Bengali and Assamese speaking people.

== History ==
Sapatgram is an ancient human habitation. Originally Sapatgram belonged to the ancient Koch Hajo (1581-1616) Kingdom under Raghudev and his son Parikshit Narayan of the Koch dynasty that stretched from Sankosh River in the west to the Bhareli River in the east on the north bank of River Brahmaputra. It was created by dividing the Kamata Kingdom then under Nara Narayana in medieval Assam.

The western boundary, the Sankosh River, is roughly the boundary between the present-day Assam and West Bengal. The western portion of the Kamata Kingdom came to be called Koch Bihar. The name Hajo comes from a legendary king Hajo the Koch, an ancestor of the Koch dynasty, who ruled over the Rangpur district in present-day Bangladesh and some regions of Assam.

In 1602, the Nawab of Dhaka and a Mughal governor moved by Lakshmi Narayan (ruler of Koch Bihar) and others attacked Parikshit Narayan, the ruler of Koch Hajo. Parikshit was defeated at Dhubri in 1614. The Mughals then appointed Kabisekhar as the kanungo and instructed Sheikh Ibrahim Karori to set up a Mughal system of administration. The Mughals appointed Bijit Narayan, son of Parikshit Narayan, as the zamindar of the region between river Sankosh and Manas. And he became the founder of the Bijni branch of the Koch royal family which finally settled in Abhayapuri.

Sapatgram on the Sonkosh became a part of two estates—Bijni and Porbatjoha. The line of demarcation ran through the middle of the present township of Sapatgram.

After independence, Sapatgram came under Goalpara District which was created by the British in 8 March 1876. At present Sapatgram is a prominent town of Dhubri district which was created by splitting Goalpara district in 1983.

== Education ==
The town has five high schools, including two English medium private schools, Sankar Dev shishu Niketan (Assamese medium school) and a high madrasa. Established in 1936, Sapatgram Bengali High School is one of the earliest sites of quality education in Assam. Sapatgram Amalgamated Academy was established in 1939. It has earned comparatively better achievement-records mainly because of its erstwhile headmaster, the late Panchanon Medhi, who was given the "Best teacher and educationist" award by the Central Govt.

The town has an arts college named Sapatgram College. It was established in 1972. The college has already earned the status of a lead site of quality education under Gauhati University, Assam.

There are also a number of Bengali, Assamese and Hindi medium primary schools in this border town between Dhubri and Kokrajhar districts.

The town has a police station (Thana) and a post office.

The PIN is 783337.

== Transport ==
Sapatgram came to the map of Indian Railways in the pre-independence period. The rail station was established in July, 1928. Though presently degraded because of demographic causes, Sapatgram (SPX) was a major railway station of NF Railway connecting the North East with the rest of India, having a passage through Bangladesh. At present the town has excellent road communication avenues also. The river Sankosh has nearly dried up and as such it is no longer used for communication.

== Occupation and livelihood ==
Sapatgram was once a distinguished timber-trading centre in Assam. However, the main occupation of the locality was cultivation, not timber-business as highlighted in the elitist history. At present the main source of livelihood of the town is cultivation and business.

== Temple ==
Sapatgram is famous for a huge Hindu temple named Lilananda Ashram. The temple was established by Thakur Lilananda in 1946. It is located at a village named Santipur at the outskirt of Sapatgram town. The holy shrine possesses a number of temples of various Hindu deities spread in an area of more than one hundred bighas of land. One of the unique features of the temple is its provision for round-the-clock Hari Naam Sankirtan. This has been going on since the day of the establishment of the temple. The disciples of Thakur Lilananda popularly known as Pagla Baba celebrate the Ratha Yatra festival every year. At present an infrastructural renovation of the temple and revamping of its religious and social activities have been going on.
