= Champabati River =

River in India

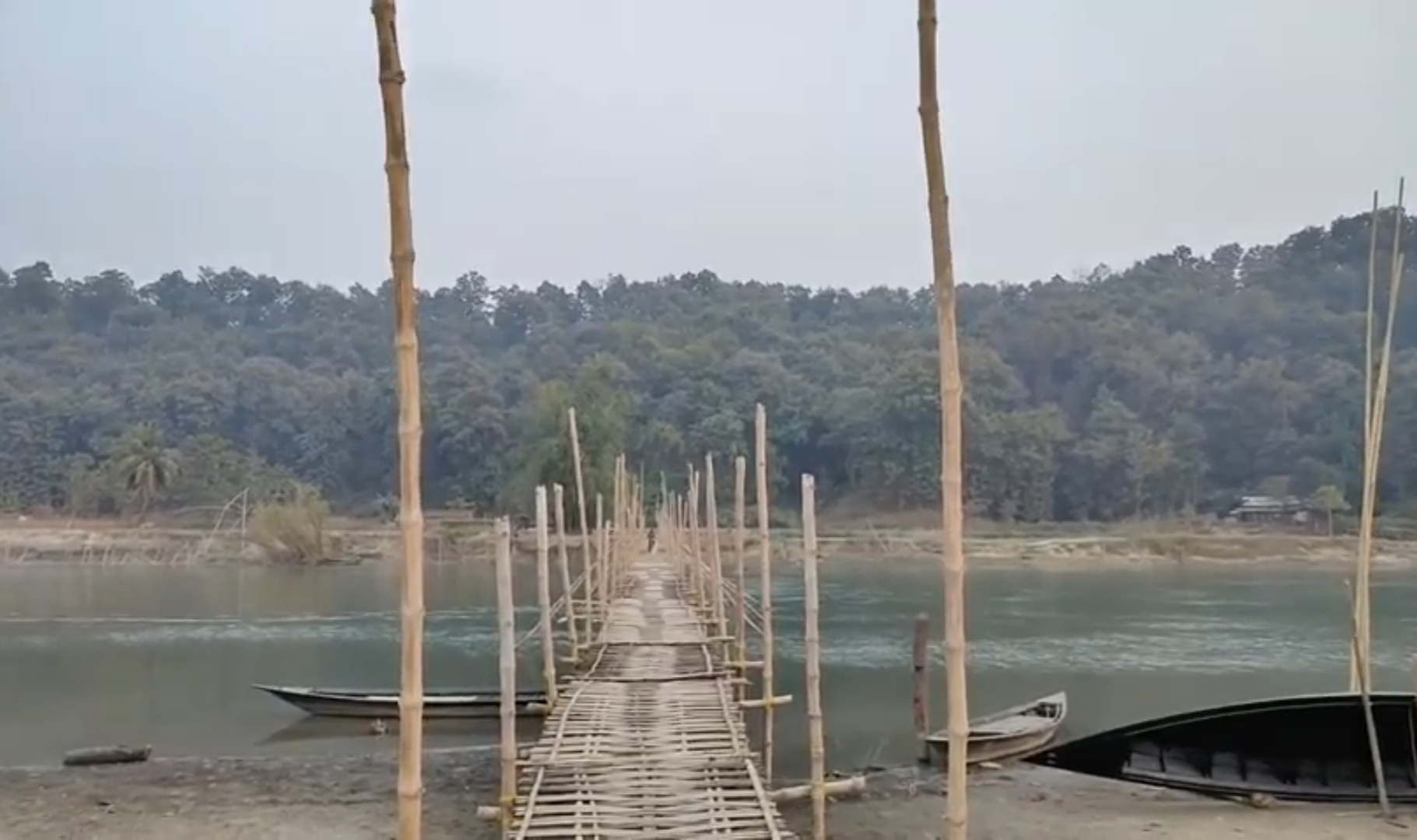
- A bamboo bridge on Champabati River in Bongaigaon district of Assam

- Mouth of Champabati River In Assam Champabati River (India)

Location
- State: Assam

Physical characteristics
- Source: Kokrajhar district
  - location: Assam
  - coordinates: 26°37′45.3″N 90°21′52.6″E
- Mouth: Brahmaputra River
  - location: Khelupara, near Chapar, Dhubri, Assam
  - coordinates: 26°15′44.352″N 90°28′39.54″E

Basin features
- Progression: Champabati River - Brahmaputra River

The Champabati River a tributary of the Brahmaputra River in the Indian state of Assam. The Champabati River has three sub tributaries - Bhur River (including Mora Bhur River), Lopani and Dhol pani which are originated from Bhutan hills.

The Bhur River originates at Gurungdando and flows through Bhur village located in Sidli Tehsil of Chirang district in Assam and after entering into Assam it takes a small river called Patiakhola. Then the Bhur River turned into a narrow sandy form and flows through Manas National Park and arrives at Shantipur and from Shantipur the Bhur river flows in south west direction and entered into Bengtal Sanctuary taking Khungrung River at its right in Hantupara. After Bengtal Sanctuary, the Bhur river flows to south taking the name of Baahbari River. Then the Bhur River flows through the Saalbari Bhurpar and takes two sub-tributaries from phoolkumari River in its both sides and meets Dholpani River and it finally takes the name of Champabati River.

The Dholpani river also originates in Bhutan hills and flows in Bhutan-India border before it takes two sub-tributaries Arne Khola river and Tiniabadhi river and finally meets the Champabati river.

The Lopani river flows through Chirang forest and takes a tributary from Jhora Beel before it meets the Dholpani river. Dholpani and Lopani meets together and take the name of Champabati river.

The Champabati river divides into two parts after crossing the National Highway 31C and finally joins the Brahmaputra River near Chapar of Dhubri district.
