= Tipkai River =

River in India

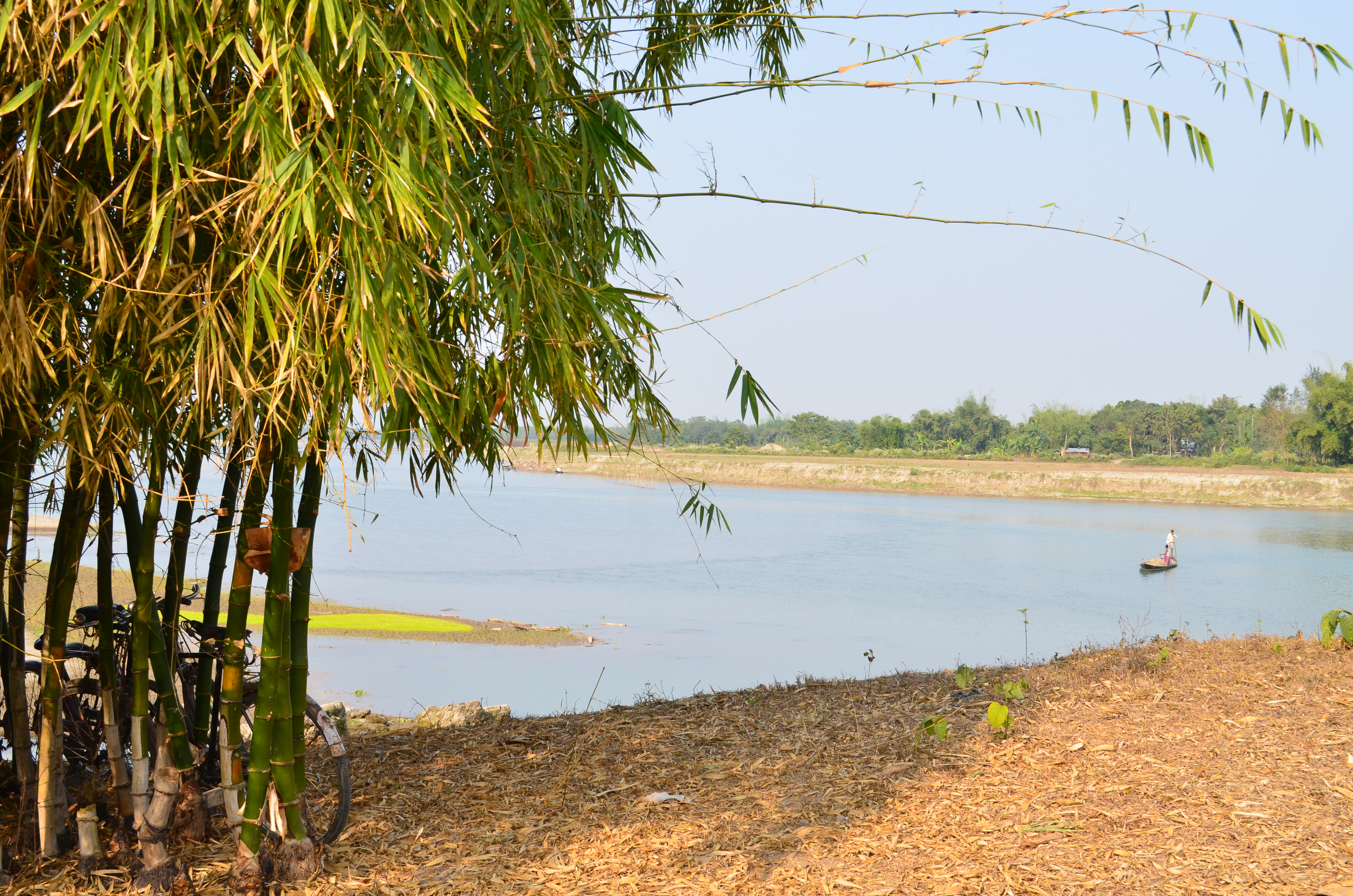
- Tipkai river in Assam

- Location within Assam Location within India
- Native name: টিপকাই নদী (Assamese)

Location
- State: Assam
- District: Kokrajhar district and Dhubri district

Physical characteristics
- Source: Bhutan hills
  - location: Bhutan
- Mouth: Brahmaputra River
  - location: Chatakurachar, Dhubri district, Assam
  - coordinates: 26°03′09.5″N 90°01′00.7″E

Basin features
- Progression: Tipkai River- Brahmaputra River

The Tipkai River is a north and Himalayan tributary of the Brahmaputra River in the Indian state of Assam. It rises in the Bhutan hills, flows through the Kokrajhar district and Dhubri district of Assam and joins the Brahmaputra River at Chatakurachar of Dhubri district.
