= Chapar, Dhubri =

Chapar
- Location in Assam, India Chapar (India)
- Coordinates: 26.27°N 90.47°E
- Country INDIA: India
- State: Assam
- DHIBRI: Dhubri

Government
  - Body: Chapar Circle office
- Elevation: 22 m (72 ft)

Population (2022)
  - Total: 50,500

Languages
  - Official: Assamese
- Time zone: UTC+5:30 (IST)
- PIN: 783371
- Vehicle registration: AS17

Chapar is a town under the Dhubri district in the state of Assam. It is located at 26.27°N 90.47°E. It has an average elevation of 22 metres (72 feet). Like the rest of Assam, Chapar frequently has problems with flooding. The town is situated on the bank of the Champabati River.

National Highway 17 passes through Chapar. Chapar Higher Secondary School, Chapar Girls High School, Ratnapith College are renowned institutions of education. Chapar faces heat waves in summers from the Brick Factories of which most doesnot follow National Green Tribunal rules. It also has to face huge pollution in winter due to these brick factories which burns huge amount of Coal without using ESP (Electro Static Presipitator) in their chimneys and releases toxic pollution. Due to this many people facing serious health issues.

== Demographics ==
As of the 2001 Indian census, As of 2022, Chapar has a population of 50500. Males constitute 52% of the population and females 48%. Chapar has an average literacy rate of 78%, higher than the national average of 73%, with male literacy of 81% and female literacy of 74%. 14% of the population is under six years of age.

== Notable people ==
- Sarat Chandra Singha, former chief minister of Assam
