= Dimow =

- Town
- Dimow
- Location in Assam, India Dimow (India)
- Coordinates: 27°40′34″N 94°48′39″E
- Country: India
- State: Assam
- district: Dhemaji district

Government
  - Body: Gram Panchayat

Population
  - Estimate: 10,000−12,000

Languages
  - Official: Assamese, Nepali, Mising
- Time zone: UTC+5:30 (IST)
- Vehicle registration: AS-22

Dimow is a medium-sized village in Sissiborgaon tehsil, Dhemaji district in the Indian state of Assam. It is situated at a distance of 48 km from its district headquarters, Dhemaji, and 16 km from the nearest town Silapathar.

== Demographics ==
As per 2011 census the total population of the village is 731 out of which 403 are males while 328 are females. The average sex ratio of the village is 814 which is lower than the state average of 958. As of 2011, the literacy rate of the village was 70.55% compared to state average of 72.19%. Male literacy stands at 82.81% while female literacy rate was at 55.59%.

== Banking Service ==
- Assam Gramin Vikash Bank Dimow Branch
- SBI CSP, Dimow (Kulajan Branch)
- Assam Gramin Vikash Bank CSP (Dimow Branch)

== Transportation ==
Currently National Highway 515 (India) is well connected to Dimow from other towns of the states and also connecting it with towns and cities of Assam and Arunachal Pradesh with nearest city being Silapathar sharing its pincode and postal office. Archipathar Halt Railway Station is 5 km from Dimow Chariali. Dibrugarh Airport, which falls under Dibrugarh District, is the nearest Airport from Dimow.

Train passing by Dimow

== Education ==
=== Schools ===
Dimow has a number of educational institutions:

- Chimenmukh Higher Secondary School, Dimow which was established in 1970 which is now the oldest school of the region
- Don Bosco Society School, Dimow is a private English medium school which was established in 1998
- Diamond English School, Dimow
- Sankardev Shishu Vidya Niketan, Dimow
- LMT Public School, Dimow

=== Colleges ===
- Dimow Charali/Junior College, Dimow
- Dhemaji polytechnic college is situated about 7 km away at Simen Chapori

== Economy ==
Agriculture is the main profession for most of the people in the village.

== Population ==
The local residents of Dimow are Assamese, Gorkha and Mishing people. Around 10,000-12,000 people live here.

== Politics ==
Dimow is part of Lakhimpur Lok Sabha constituency. The sitting MP is Pradan Baruah. The sitting MLA is Bhubon Pegu.

== Attractions ==
Dimow has several attractions, Dimow picnic spot, Dimow River and Dipa Mountain View. Some of the places to visit 16 km from Dimow are: Malinithan Temple, ancient ruins, lush green pastures, hiking and camping tours, and nature and wildlife.
