= Borhat =

- Village
- Borhat
- Location in Assam, India Borhat (India)
- Coordinates: 27.15°N 95.28°E
- Country: India
- State: Assam
- District: Charaideo

Languages
  - Official: Assamese
- Time zone: UTC+5:30 (IST)
- PIN: 785693
- Telephone code: 03772
- Vehicle registration: AS
- Nearest city: Sivasagar

Borhat is a partially urbanised village in the eastern part of Charaideo district, Assam separated from Namrup town in the east by the river Disang or Delehi. In the west Sapekhati, in the south the Tirap district of Arunachal Pradesh, in the north the Tingkhong tehsil of Dibrugarh district including the town of Namrup, Assam. The nearest towns are Sonari, Duliajan and Naharkatia. There is a small railway station named Borhat which is in the centre of the region. During the rule of the Chutias, it was a place for finding mineral salt, after 1523 it came under the rule of Suhungmung Dihingia Raja (1497–1539) and under the domain of the Ahom kingdom. During Ahom's rule, Borhat was known as a place for finding mineral salt. The name Borhat is originated from Bor (meaning big) and hat (meaning market). There was a marketplace where salt was available. Salt was considered to be very precious during Ahom rule as Assam is far from the seas and people had to use only mineral salts.

Modern-day Borhat has several tea gardens (including Borhat Bagicha and Mahalakhi Tea Estate), some of which were founded by the British and many families have small tea plantations in their orchards.

Educational institutions in Borhat include Borhat Jatiya Vidyalaya, Borhat BPBM College, Borhat Junior College, Borhat Higher Secondary School, Borhat New High School, Sankardev Sishu Vidya Niketan, Greenview Academy, Holy Mother English School, Luhalia LP School, and St. John’s School.

There are also several banks, including a branch of the State Bank of India (SBI; situated in the middle of its region) and an Assam Gramin Vikash Bank (AGVB) branch. There is a post office (PIN No: 785693) and a primary health centre serving the area.

There are also several tourist destinations in Borhat, including Naharpukhuri Pond, Hilghagori Waterfall, Dillihghat, Khutughat, Chakalia Pothar, and Japihojia Gaon.

Religious centres include Borhat Milan Nagar Namghor, Borhat Anchalik Sankari Sangha Namghor, Borhat Jame Masjid, Misajaan Kali Mandir, and Rangbari Church.

Borhat itself is a fusion of several small villages eg. Borhat Habi Gaon, Chakalia, Japihojia, Borhat michajan Gaon, Narempothar, Titlagarh, Naharpukhuri, Nalbaria, Changmai, Sutiakari, Borhat Bagan, Halua, Lefera, Bihubor, Lakili Habi, Nagakota, Dangorikumar, Nagahat, Kolakota, Bimlapur, Dofola, Bhuyankhat, Borasali, Sumdar, Nagahilloni, Khoriabheta, and Dabohibil.
