= Sanmilita Gana Shakti =

Political party in Assam, India

- Abbreviation: SGS
- President: Paramananda Chayengia
- ECI Status: Regional Party
- Alliance: NDA
- Seats in Rajya Sabha: 0 / 245
- Seats in Lok Sabha: 0 / 543
- Seats in Assam Legislative Assembly: 0 / 126
- Seats in Mising Autonomous Council: 29 / 36

Party flag
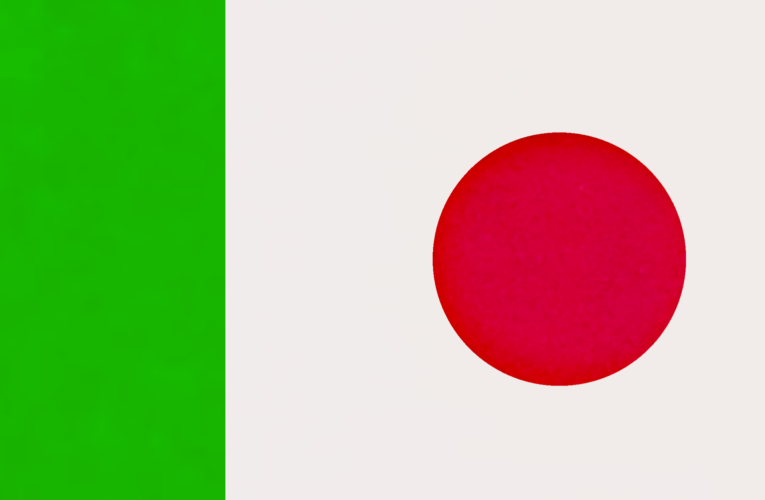

Website
- sanmilitaganashaktiasom.org

The Sanmilita Gana Shakti (SGS) is a regional political party in the Indian state of Assam. It was founded in 2005 as part of anti-dam movements among the Mising people. Founder Ranoj Pegu joined the Bharatiya Janata Party in 2017, and was included in the Himanta Biswa Sarma-led National Democratic Alliance government of Assam. The party is led by Paramananda Chayengia, who is the chief executive councilor of the Mising Autonomous Council.

== History ==
In 2005, the "Sanmilita Gana Mancha" party was formed out of "Sanmilita Janagosthiya Samanyar Akshay Samiti" political convention, which was held in Gogamukh with the representatives from the area covering Mising Autonomous Council. It was later renamed as “Sanmilita Gana-Shakti”.

== Party leadership ==
Paramananda Chayengia is the president and Sunil Kumar Pegu is the executive president. Hiranya Dutta, Raju Khanikar and Purushottam Doley are general secretaries.

== Electoral performance ==
In the 2019 election, Sanmilita Gana Shakti won 29 of the 36 seats in the Mising Autonomous Council.

Ranoj Pegu was a perennial candidate in the Lok Sabha elections from Lakhimpur constituency.
