= Sarat Barkotoky =

Indian politician (1935–2023)

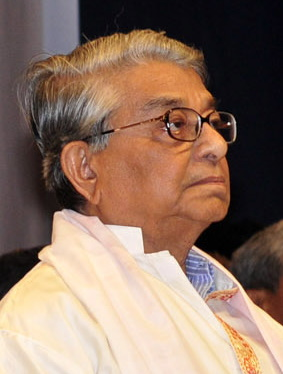
- Barkotoky in 2015

Cabinet Minister, Assam
- In office 26 January 2015 – 24 May 2016
- Chief Minister: Tarun Gogoi
- Departments: Education; Pension and Public Grievances
- Preceded by: Pradyut Bordoloi (Education); Tanka Bahadur Rai (P&PG)
- Succeeded by: Himanta Biswa Sarma (Education); Sarbananda Sonowal (P&PG)
- In office 17 May 2001 – 21 May 2006
- Chief Minister: Tarun Gogoi
- Departments: Public Works; Excise (2001–02, 2004–06); Town and Country Planning (2001–02)

Vice Chairman, Assam State Planning Board
- In office 2006–2015
- Chairman: Tarun Gogoi

Minister of State, Assam
- In office 30 June 1991 – 14 May 1996
- Chief Minister: Hiteswar Saikia
- Departments: Public Works (Plains); Printing and Stationery; Secondary Education

Member, Assam Legislative Assembly
- In office 11 June 1991 – 19 May 2016
- Preceded by: Bhadreswar Buragohain
- Succeeded by: Topon Kumar Gogoi
- Constituency: Sonari

Personal details
- Born: 1 March 1935 Mathurapur, Sonari, Assam Province, British India
- Died: 30 October 2023 (aged 88)
- Party: Indian National Congress
- Spouse: Bina Barkotoky (m. 1965)
- Children: 3
- Parent(s): Hem Chandra Barkotoky (Father); Chandra Probha Barkotoky (Mother)

Sarat Barkotoky (1 March 1935 – 30 October 2023) was an Indian politician from the state of Assam. He was a Member of Assam Legislative Assembly for Sonari constituency and education minister in 2015-16. He was earlier also a Minister of State in the Hiteswar Saikia cabinet.

== Early life and education ==
Barkotoky was born in Mathurapur, Sonari on 1 March 1935 to Chandra Barkotoky and Chandra Probha Barkotoky. He had a B.T. Examination in the year 1970 from Dibrugarh University. He also had a B.A.

== Political career ==
Barkotoky was the Indian National Congress candidate for the constituency of Sonari in the 1991 Assam Legislative Assembly election. His predecessor, Bhadreswar Buragohain, did not seek reelection and became a Rajya Sabha MP. Barkotoky received 38877 votes, 57.96% of the total vote and became the new MLA for Sonari. He defeated his nearest opponent by 23491 votes. He was made a minister of state in the Hiteswar Saikia cabinet. After Saikia died, he retained his role as minister of state in the short Barman ministry.

Barkotoky sought reelection in the 1996 Assam Legislative Assembly election. He received 52052 votes, 61.8% of the total vote and defeated his nearest opponent by 31464 votes.

Barkotoky was again a candidate in the 2001 Assam Legislative Assembly election. He received 59554 votes, 67.25%. He defeated his nearest opponent by 34941 votes. He was made minister for the Public Works Department in the 2001 Tarun Gogoi cabinet. As PWD minister, Barkotoky implemented a Mega project for development of road and drainage of Assam, spending 50 crore.

In the 2006 Assam Legislative Assembly election, Barkotoky sought reelection. He received 56206 votes, defeating his nearest opponent by 34990 votes. When Tarun Gogoi constituted his new ministry, Barkotoky was not included.

In the 2011 Assam Legislative Assembly election, he sought reelection in Sonari. He received 56655 votes, 53.38% of the total vote. He defeated his nearest opponent by 28904 votes. After a cabinet reshuffle in the Tarun Gogoi ministry, on 23 January 2015 Barkotoky was made Education minister in Assam. He spoke with the Chief Minister when he said the education was the priority in Assam. He also requested that Smriti Irani organise state grants for universities.

In the 2016 Assam Legislative Assembly election, Barkotoky sought reelection as the Congress candidate for Sonari. He received 49210 votes, 37.47% of the total vote. He lost to BJP candidate, Topon Kumar Gogoi, by 24117 votes. He was one of 10 cabinet ministers who lost in the election.

== Personal life and death ==
Barkotoky married Bina Barkotoky on 5 June 1965 and they had 3 children; two sons and one daughter. He was interested in sports like Table Tennis, Badminton, Carrom etc. He was associated with various political and cultural organisations. He was also Vice Chairman of the State Planning Board from 2006 and Chairman of the Committee on Estimates, ALA from 2010.

Sharat Barkatki died on 30 October, at the age of 88. He had been undergoing treatment at GMCH from 16 October.
