= Mising Autonomous Council =

District council in Assam, India

Mising Autonomous Council Mising Ka:sí:suné Milung
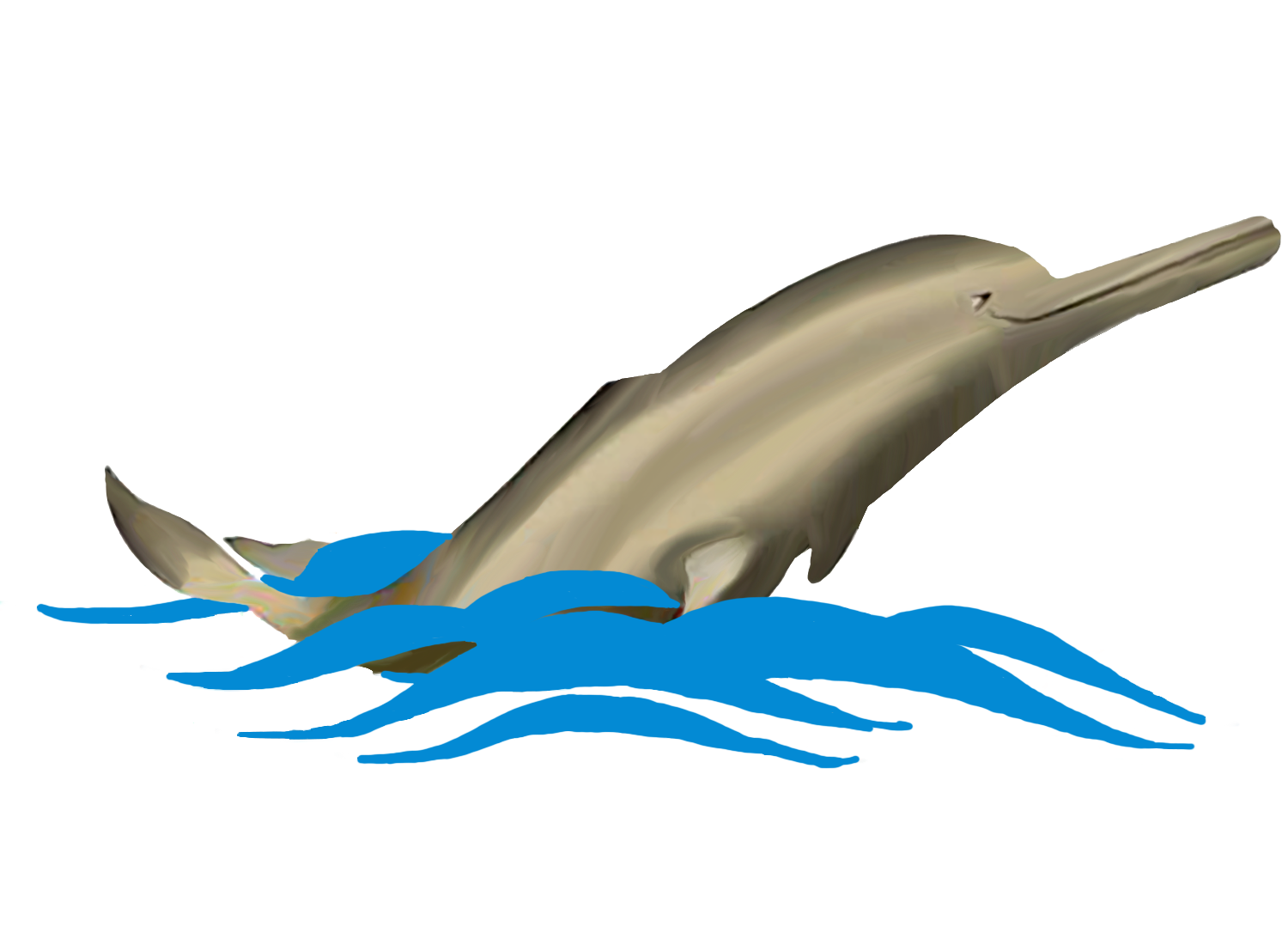

Type
- Type: Autonomous District Council
- Term limits: 5 years

Leadership
- Chairman: Sunil Kumar Pegu
- Chief Executive Councillor: Paramananda Chayengia

Structure
- Seats: 36
- Political groups: Government (35): SGS (29); BJP (6); Vacant (1): Vacant (1)

Elections
- Voting system: First past the post
- Last election: January 2019
- Next election: 2026

Meeting place
- MAC Secretariat, Gogamukh, Dhemaji

Website
- https://www.macassam.org

The Mising Autonomous Council (MAC), (sometimes Mishing), is an autonomous district council for the Mising people in Dhemaji, Lakhimpur, Sonitpur, Biswanath, Dibrugarh, Tinsukia, Sivasagar, Jorhat and Majuli in the state of Assam in India, with its headquarters in Dhemaji. The council was established in 1995.

== Current General Members ==
=== List of the Elected Members 2019 ===
#	Constituency	District	Elected General Member	Party	Remarks
1.	Lali	Dhemaji	Ratiram Basumatary		
2.	Murkongselek	Dhemaji	Naresh Kumbang		
3.	Gali Bijoypur	Dhemaji	Raju Medak		
4.	Debing Detak	Dhemaji	Podum Rai		
5.	Owang Jonai	Dhemaji	Bobikanta Pegu		
6.	Sanjari Nwgwr	Dhemaji	Malendra Narzary		
7.	Simen Somkong	Dhemaji	Bhabani Duwarah		
8.	Silasuti	Dhemaji	Kanak Doley		
9.	Muktiar	Dhemaji	Pratap Chandra Taye		
10.	Akajan	Dhemaji	TBA		Election Not Held
11.	Ujani Sisi Tongani	Dhemaji	Jagyeswar Kutum		
12.	Namoni Sisi Tongani	Dhemaji	Johan Doley		
13.	Sisimukh	Dhemaji	Labanya Mili		
14.	Jiadhal	Dhemaji	Bani Kantara Doley		
15.	Gogamukh	Dhemaji	Raju Pegu		
16.	Nalbari	Dhemaji	Prabhat Basumatary		
17.	Mingmang	Dhemaji	Paramananda Chayengia		
18.	Bhimpora Boginodi	Lakhimpur	Anil Payeng		
19.	Ghunasuti Pub Telahi	Lakhimpur	Biju Pegu		
20.	Obonori	Lakhimpur	Indira Kumbang		
21.	Pub Dhakuakhana	Lakhimpur	Sunil Pegu		
22.	Kherkota Danghora	Lakhimpur	Beauty Pegu		
23.	Luhit Pashim	Lakhimpur	Mukul Pegu		
24.	Ranganadi	Lakhimpur	Debaranjan Morang		
25.	Dikrong	Lakhimpur	Dilip Pegu		
26.	Jiabhoroli	Sonitpur	Raju Chintey		
27.	Lohitmukh	Sonitpur	Rekha Pegu Kutum		
28.	Dhansiri Disoi	Golaghat	Sushir Morang		
29.	Gelabil	Golaghat	Liva Pegu Mili		
30.	Sangga Majuli	Jorhat	Nilo Doley		
31.	Phuloni Jokaibowa	Jorhat	Troilukya Pamegam		
32.	Ra:dang Rikkong Majuli	Jorhat	Uma Pathori		
33.	Jorhat	Jorhat	Purusutam Doley		
34.	Dikhow-Disang	Sibsagar	Niva Pegu Mili		
35.	Dihing Sessa	Dibrugarh	Prashanta Bori		
36.	Saidya	Tinsukia	Mulson Pegu		

== Executive Members ==
List of Executive Members
#	Name	Designation	Department
1	Sunil Kumar Pegu	Chairman	
2	Jogyeswar Kutum	Vice-Chairman	
3	Paramananda Chayengia	Chief Executive Member	PWD, Education, Museum & Archaeology and any other departments not allotted to other Executive Members
4	Raju Medok	Executive Member	
5	Johan Doley	Executive Member	Councillor P&RD, Tribal Research, Museum
6	Purusutam Doley	Executive Member	Family & Health Welfare, Land & Land Revenue
7	Prabhat Basumatary	Executive Member	PHE, Sports & Youth Welfare
8	Molendra Narzary	Executive Member	WPT & BC
9	Naresh Kumbang	Executive Member	Water Resources
10	Biju Pegu	Executive Member	Minor Irrigation, Social Forestry
11	Debaranjan Morang	Executive Member	Agriculture & Transport
12	Prasanta Kr Bori	Executive Member	Cultural Affairs, Tourism
13	Indira Kumbang	Executive Member	Handloom & Sericulture
14	Bhawani Dowarah	Executive Member	Social Welfare
15	Uma Pathori	Executive Member	Fishery

== Departments under MAC ==
There are 27 departments under the jurisdiction of Mising Autonomous Council. All departments are listed in the table below.

List of departments under Mising Autonomous Council (MAC)
#	Name of the Department
1	Cottage Industry
2	Animal Husbandry and Veterinary
3	Forest
4	Agriculture
5	Rural Roads and Bridges
6	Sericulture
7	Education
8	Cultural Affairs
9	Soil Conservation
10	Co-operation
11	Fisheries
12	Panchayat & Rural Development
13	Handloom & Textiles
14	Public Health Engineering-Drinking Water
15	Minor Irrigation
16	Social Welfare
17	Flood Control Schemes for protection of Villages
18	Sports & Youth Welfare
19	Weights & Measures
20	Library Services
21	Museum & Archaeology
22	Urban Development, Town & Country Planning
23	Tribal Research
24	Land & Land Revenue
25	Publicity & Public Relation
26	Tourism
27	Transport

== Election ==
=== 2019 Election ===
The NDA alliance, Sanmilita Gana Shakti, won the election securing 29 seats on the council. The BJP and SGS together secured 34 out of the 35 seats. Paramananda Chayengia was appointed as Chief Executive Member of the council.

== See also ==
- Mising Agom Kebang
- Takam Mising Porin Kebang
- Sanmilita Gana Shakti
