= Jonai Assembly constituency =

Constituency of the Assam legislative assembly in India

Jonai
- Constituency No. 80 for the Assam Legislative Assembly

Constituency details
- Country: India
- Region: Northeast India
- State: Assam
- District: Dhemaji
- Lok Sabha constituency: Lakhimpur
- Established: 1951
- Reservation: ST
- Elected year: 2021

Jonai Assembly constituency is one of the 126 assembly constituencies of Assam a north east state of India. Jonai is also part of Lakhimpur Lok Sabha constituency. It is a reserved seat for the scheduled tribes.

== Members of Legislative Assembly ==
Election	Member	Party affiliation
1978	Romesh Mohan Kouli	Janata Party
1983	Puspadhar Pegu	Indian National Congress
1985	Phani Ram Tayeng	Independent
1991	Gomeswar Pegu	Indian National Congress
1996	Pradan Baruah	Asom Gana Parishad
2001	Pradan Baruah	Indian National Congress
2006	Bhubon Pegu	Independent
2011	Pradan Baruah	Indian National Congress
2016	Bhubon Pegu	Independent
2021	Bhubon Pegu	Bharatiya Janata Party
2026	Bhubon Pegu	Bharatiya Janata Party

== Election results ==
=== 2026 ===
2026 Assam Legislative Assembly election: Jonai
Party	Candidate	Votes	%	±%
BJP	Bhubon Pegu	128940	72.54	
INC	Raj Kumar Medak	48816	27.46	
NOTA	NOTA	2397	1.33	
Margin of victory		80124		
Turnout		180153		
Rejected ballots				
Registered electors				
BJP hold		Swing		

=== 2021 ===
2021 Assam Legislative Assembly election: Jonai
Party	Candidate	Votes	%	±%
BJP	Bhubon Pegu	168,411	68.69	+49.71
INC	Hema Hari Prasanna Pegu	57,424	23.42	+8.44
AJP	Phaniram Tayeng	7,726	3.15	N/A
Independent	Madhab Machahary	6,404	2.61	N/A
Independent	Bhabani Boro	1,511	0.62	N/A
JD(U)	Bhagya Chungkrang	1,006	0.41	N/A
NOTA	None of the above	2,676	1.09	+0.26
Majority		1,10,987	45.27	+21.36
Turnout		2,45,158	78.53	−3.32
Registered electors		3,12,180		
BJP hold		Swing		

=== 2016 ===
2016 Assam Legislative Assembly election: Jonai
Party	Candidate	Votes	%	±%
Independent	Bhubon Pegu	88,441	42.89	
BJP	Aswini Pait	39,148	18.98	
Independent	Satho Basumatary	33,265	16.13	
INC	Sushil Pegu	30,890	14.98	
Independent	Lenindra Kumar Doley	5,625	2.73	
Independent	Hitesh Deori	2,290	1.11	
Independent	Bhupen Narah	2,120	1.03	
Independent	Janki Kumar Pegu	1,519	0.74	
Independent	Naren Sonowal	1,068	0.52	
NOTA	None of the above	1,417	0.83	
Majority		49,293	23.91	
Turnout		2,06,216	81.85	
Registered electors		2,51,932		
Independent gain from INC		Swing		

== See also ==
- Jonai
- List of constituencies of Assam Legislative Assembly
