= Dilip Saikia Sonowal =

Indian politician

Dilip Saikia Sonowal (1953 - 9 December 2016) was an Indian politician from Asom Gana Parishad who served as a minister for Assam. He was elected as a Member of the Legislative Assembly from the Dhemaji district for four consecutive terms, from 1985 to 2001.
