= Patir =

Patir can refer to:

== People ==
- Sumitra Patir Indian politician

== Food ==
- Pastil, a Filipino packed rice dish
