= Namrup =

- Town
- Location in Assam, India Namrup (India)
- Coordinates: 27.11°N 95.21°E
- Country: India
- State: Assam
- District: Dibrugarh

Area
  - Total: 13.5 km^{2} (5.2 sq mi)
- Elevation: 125 m (410 ft)

Population (2001)
  - Total: 18,929
  - Density: 1,400/km^{2} (3,630/sq mi)

Languages
  - Official: Assamese
- Time zone: UTC+5:30 (IST)
- PIN: 786623
- Telephone code: (91)374
- ISO 3166 code: IN-AS
- Vehicle registration: AS-06

BVFC logo

Namrup is a small town situated close to the foothills of the Patkai Hills in the extreme southeastern part of Assam, India. The river Dihing or Disang flows through it. Namrup is situated amidst wet-paddy fields, indigenous Assamese villages, orchards, large tea gardens and densely forested hills. Administratively, Namrup is located within the Dibrugarh district and is today an important industrial town of Assam. Namrup is approximately 75 km from Dibrugarh by road towards the south-east and approximately 50 km from Tinsukia (locally pronounced as Tinicukeeya) towards the south. It is also a small railway station in Dibrugarh-Guwahati broad-gauge railway line. The nearest airport is Dibrugarh located at a distance of approximately 70 km. Other urban areas close to Namrup are Naharkatiya - 18 km, Duliajan - 35 km, Sonari - 20 km, Moran - 55 km, etc. by roadways. Namrup is located around 500 km east of Guwahati, the largest city in the North East Region.

== History ==
Namrup is a historic place and the word Namrup is associated with probably life of the initial Tai-Shan settlers in the region as nam in Tai means water and 'rup' or 'ruk' in Tai means five (5). It is a region of five rivers. The name of the town during the pre-Ahom period is not known, but it is easily understood that the area was inhabited by considerable size of population under the Borahis chiefly along with other indigenous ethnic groups like Chutia, Moran, Kachari. Namrup was an important place during the Ahom Kingdom.

Namrup was the seat for the Namrupeeya Roja, one of the four contenders of the throne representing an important clan of the royal dynasty. Coraikhurung in Namrup was used as a secret place and a safe habitat of the king during the external attacks from west. Namrup also had a Koliyapany (a jail of special kind) during the Ahom Kingdom. The Dhodor Aali was constructed four hundred years back connecting the then capital Garhgaon and Joypur via Borhat.

Namrup today is known for its three main industries viz. BVFCL (Brahmaputra Valley Fertilizer Corporation Ltd.), APL (Assam Petrochemicals Ltd.) and NTPS (Namrup Thermal Power Station). The history of this modern town started with the decision of the Indian Government to establish a natural gas-based fertilizer factory in the area during the early 1960s.

== Geography ==
Namrup is located at 27.18°N 95.33°E. It has an average elevation of 124 metres (406 feet). River Disang, which is a tributary of Brahmaputra river passes through this town.

== Demographics ==
As of 2001 India census, Namrup had a population of 18,921. Males constitute 54% of the population and females 46%. Namrup has an average literacy rate of 87%, higher than the national average of 59.5%: male literacy is 88%, and female literacy is 85%. In Namrup, 8% of the population is under 6 years of age. The town has experienced rapid growth in population since the 1960s and the pace of growth increases further due to the establishment of the Assam Petrochemical Limited's unit and the thermal power station.

The main communities living in the area are migrant Tea-tribes of Assam and indigenous ethnic groups like Chutia, Sonowal Kacharis, Bodo–Kachari people, Keot (Kaibarta) and Tai people.

A demographic feature of the town is the population composition and multi-culturalism. Due to industrialisation, skilled and unskilled population (workers with families) not only from different parts of Assam, but also from different parts of India has migrated into it. The large industrial colony of the BVFC is a true example of such a situation. Moreover, there are people from various parts of the country in business and commerce and transportation services.

== Urban morphology ==
Three large industrial colonies, the large factory area of BVFCL and the outgrowth in the surrounding villages mostly along the Joypur-Namrup Railway Station road in a north to south direction forms the urban fabric of Namrup. The retail commercial areas in the Sonari Tiniali and the BVFC market together forms short of a town-centre, which is also very close to the ASTC bus depot and the central Namghor (the religious-cultural place and the auditorium).

Insiders usually do not differentiate between the internal colony areas with the outgrowth due to strong socio-economic and day to day interactions. So it is interesting that while listing various places within Namrup one tends to go on doing so like Sector A, Sector B......New Colony, Sonari Tiniali, Daily Bozaar, Deuboriya Bozaar, APL, Thermal, Dilihghat, etc.

== Economy ==
BVFC Ltd. manages the town and contributes to its economy

Namrup's economy is primarily industrial. Other sectors such as the transport and communication, services and trade and commerce in the town have grown only to support the industrial economy and the industrial population. Namrup is perhaps the most industrialised town in the entire upper Assam area.

Namrup is the first place in India where a natural gas-based fertilizer factory was established - It made use of natural gas, water (in the form of steam) and Nitrogen (from air) to produce urea. At first, it was under the administrative control of FCIL (Fertilizer Corporation of India) but later it was transferred to HFCL (Hindustan Fertilizer Corporation Ltd.). After it was decided (around 2002) that HFCL would be closed, the Namrup unit was bifurcated from HFCL and renamed BVFCL - Presently, it has three trains of Urea & Ammonia named Namrup-I (Practically dead), Namrup-II and Namrup-III. In addition to BVFCL, Namrup also has a medium-sized petrochemical company named Assam Petrochemicals Limited (APL) and a thermal power station under Assam State Electricity Board. Moreover, Namrup has substantial coal mining activities close to the hilly areas of Dilihghat. It also has a quarry of importance. Several large tea-gardens surrounding the town also contribute to its economy. There are wet-paddy fields and orchards in the villages surrounding the town.

== Quality of life ==
Industrial economy of Namrup has contributed substantially in development of a good quality of life. Namrup has considerably good social infrastructure.

It is an important town in terms of health infrastructure serving large parts of Dibrugarh, Xiwoxagor (Sibsagar) districts and Arunachal Pradesh. BVFC hospital is a large health facility in the southern part of Dibrugarh district. Apart from it all the other industrial colonies have their good health infrastructure and a government dispensary is also working in the town.

Namrup also has facilities supporting primary and secondary education. The BVFC Model Higher Secondary School, the BVFC H.S. School and the Kendriya Vidyalaya Namrup are large schools in the region. Moreover, there are at least seven high schools in and around. The town does not have many tertiary education institutes. Namrup College is the only tertiary education facility.

All the three industrial colonies possess good urban utility infrastructure at par any industrial colonies having clubs (BVFCL Officers' Club, APL Club, BVFCL Workers Club, NTPS Club), stadium, sports fields, parks etc.; although the town does not have an integrated utility system. BVFC ltd. has a water treatment plant serving its population. Sanitation in the town is mostly septic tank based and the waste treatment is not comprehensive and up to the mark.

Public transport system within the town is mostly based on electric rickshaws. Electric rickshaws are convenient and non-polluting and are suitable as per the requirements of population and size of the town. Individual motorbikes, cycles and four-wheelers are popular among the residents. For inter-regional and inter-city transportation, the town has an ASTC (Assam State Transport Corporation) bus stand. But the most important inter-city and regional linkages are supported by the numerous private buses linking almost all the cities and towns in Upper and Central Assam and also with Guwahati. Namrup rail station in the Dibrugarh-Tinicukeeya (Tinsukia)-Guwahati main line is a stop for a few regional and also long-distance trains.

== Education ==
=== School ===
- ASEB High School, Namrup
- BVFC Model H.S School
- BVFC HS School
- Kendriya Vidyalaya
- Behive Axom Public School
- Gurutol School, Namrup

=== College ===
- Namrup College
- National Institute Of Fire & Safety Engineering Guwahati Assam
- Namrup College of Teacher Education(CTE Namrup)

== Places of interest ==
Namrup is a place with three major industries viz. The B.V.F.C.L, the APL and the thermal power project.

The Dillighat in Namrup is a picnic spot in Upper Assam. During the winter and mostly during the New Year's Day Dillighat becomes a busy picnic spot, along with the jackwell situated near the BVFCL factory is a tourist attraction of this area. Clean water, river-bed rocks, green canopy of forests and tea gardens are attractions in Dillighat. Dillighat is situated on the banks of river dilli or disang (a tributary of mighty Luit or Brahmaputra) in Namrup and Borhat (a place adjoining to Namrup in Sivasagar District).

Other places of interest within the town include the Namrup Bagan, the ASEB-(world’s largest baseload turbine station) colony, Kheremeeya Village, Dilli Dowania Gaon, Rangagoraah, Dillighat, Naliapool, Jackwell, waterfalls in patkai range, railway station, and gandhi maidan.

Moreover, Namrup is centrally and closely located to several other attractions such as the Joy-Dihing Rainforest (10–15 km north), Coraideu - the ancient capital (25 km south-east), Tai-Phake village with traditional unique phake-life (13–14 km north). Moreover, it is closely located to many places in Arunachal Pradesh such as Deomali( a riverside picnic spot), Miao (picnic spot), Namdapha National Park, Khunsa (a small hill-town), etc.
