= Dharmeswar Konwar =

Indian politician

Dharmeswar Konwar (born 1971) is an Indian politician from Assam. He is an MLA from Sonari Assembly constituency in Charaideo district. He won the 2021 Assam Legislative Assembly election representing the Bharatiya Janata Party.

== Early life and education ==
Konwar is from Sonari, Charaideo district, Assam. He is the son of late Tikhnadhar Konwar. He passed Class 12 in 1991 at Dhole Bagan Higher Secondary School and passed the examinations under the Assam Higher Secondary Educational Council.

== Career ==
Konwar won from the Sonari Assembly constituency representing the Bharatiya Janata Party in the 2021 Assam Legislative Assembly election. He polled 69,690 votes and defeated his nearest rival, Sushil Kumar Suri of the Indian National Congress, by 15,117 votes.
