= Tabu Taid =

Indian educationist, linguist, author, and administrator (1942–2019)

Tabu Ram Taid
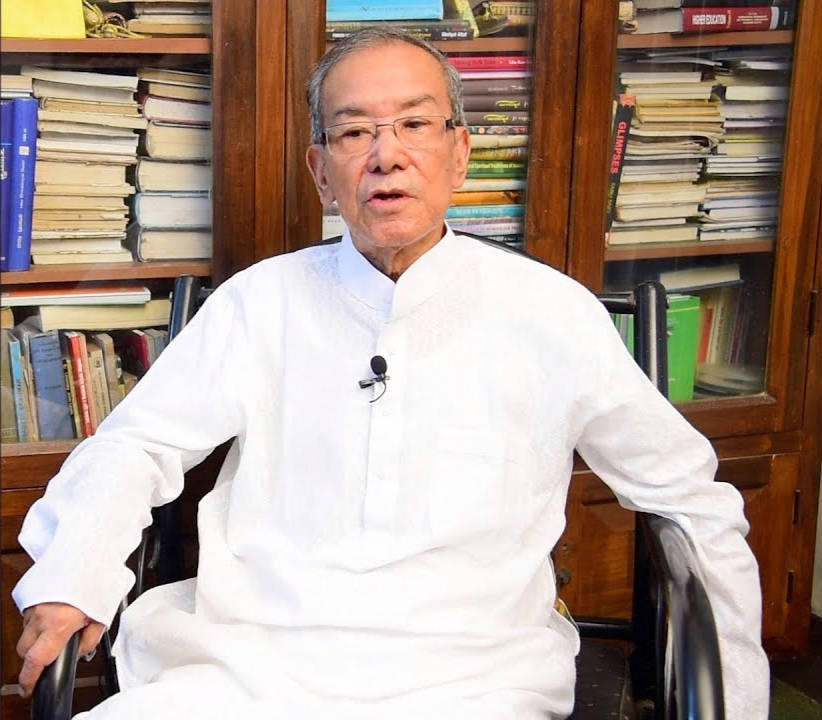
- Tabu Taid
- Born: 1 August 1942; Ghunasuti Ayengiya, Lakhimpur, British India (now Assam, India)
- Died: 17 August 2019 (aged 77); Guwahati, Assam, India
- Education: University of London
- Occupations: Educationist, Linguist, Editor, Professor, Author, Administrator
- Writing career
- Genres: Non Fiction, Language Studies, Linguistics, Grammar
- Notable works: -Mising Gompir Kumsung (A Granary of Mising Words), published in 2010 -A Dictionary of the Mising Language, published in 1995

Tabu Ram Taid known as Tabu Taid, (1 August 1942 – 17 August 2019) was an Indian educationist, linguist, author and administrator.

== Early life and education ==
Tabu Taid was born on 1 August 1942 in a geographically remote and economically challenged village Ghunasuti Ayengia in Lakhimpur district of Assam, India. His father was Ubbang Taid, a poor farmer who had to work hard to meet the needs of the family of two daughters, five sons and his wife, a nine-member family.

The village, 'Ghunasuti Ayengia' is a settlement of a small indigenous tribe of Assam, the Misings or Miri. Often visited by floods during the monsoon season, the villagers were poor subsistence level farmers. As of 1942, education or awareness of the need for formal education was not much prevailing in rural Assam. However, Ubbang Taid, being able to read and write in Assamese, the major language of the region, understood the need of formal education and sent his sons (excluding the eldest) to school.

Tabu Taid performed well in his academic life. After finishing lower primary in his native village, and upper primary and high school in the nearest town North Lakhimpur, Tabu Taid went on to receive intermediate and undergraduate level education under Calcutta University and postgraduate level education at Delhi University. Earlier, when Tabu Taid was in the 7th standard, the infamous 'Bor Bhumikampa', 1950 Assam–Tibet earthquake, devastated the Lakhimpur area in Assam, affecting the already poor, disadvantaged people living there, quite significantly. To top it, the flood situation worsened owing to the change of course of the rivers in the area due to the earthquake. So Tabu Taid's family was suffering acute financial crisis at that time. But, being a brilliant student, he was helped by the Ramakrishna Mission Vidyalaya, Narendrapur in Kolkata. They agreed to bear the cost for his post-Matric education. He received his graduation with honors in English from the Ramakrishna Mission Residential College, Narendrapur under Calcutta University in 1963 and moved on to Delhi for higher education. Working as a schoolteacher in Delhi for sometime, he enrolled in the Hindu College, University of Delhi in 1964 and obtained his Postgraduate degree in English from the University of Delhi in 1966.

Tabu Taid started his professional life as a lecturer of English in Cotton College, Guwahati, Assam. He went to the United Kingdom after being awarded a scholarship under a competitive State Overseas Scholarships Scheme, where he obtained a Postgraduate diploma on Applied Linguistics from University of Reading, UK (1973–1974). He also completed a certificate course in Distance Education at the University of London Institute of Education, UCL Institute of Education, (1982) under a British Council fellowship program.

He was recommended for the Indian Foreign Service by the Union Public Service Commission, Government of India, making him the first person in the Mising community to attain such an honorable distinction. However, he could not join the service due to health problems at that time.

== Work as an educator and education administrator ==
Tabu Ram Taid started his career as a school teacher. After completing his higher education, he joined as a lecturer in English at Cotton College, Guwahati. Tabu Ram Taid left the teaching post he held at Cotton College for fourteen years (1967–1981) and joined as an educational administrator in 1981, being posted first as a Deputy Director of Public Instruction. Later he was elevated to different higher posts such as Director, SCERT, Director of Secondary Education, Director of Higher Education, Chairman, Board of Secondary Education, Chairman, State Selection Board (higher education), etc. under the Education Department of the Government of Assam. The state government had also deputed Prof. Taid as the first Director of the state-sponsored Institute, named Anundoram Borooah Institute of Language, Art and Culture, entrusting him with the responsibility of building it up as an institute for research and publications, especially in the areas of indigenous languages, literature and culture – a job which he accomplished well. He retired from state government service in the year 2000, but continued as the Chairman of the State Selection Board (higher education) till February 2004. During the years of his assignment as the chairman of the board of Secondary Education, Assam (1996–2000), he was the unanimous choice for the chair of the Zonal Council of Boards of Secondary Education (COBSE), North-East Zone, and he was due to take over as the Chairman of the national body (COBSE) on 4 April 2001, but meanwhile he had returned to his parent post on 1 April 2000.

== Public Service ==
Tabu Taid, over the years, has held various other positions of public responsibility and service. He was formerly:

Member, Education Reforms Commission, Assam, 1993; Member, Publication Board, Assam; Member, Regional Committee (Assam), Sahitya Akademi and National Book Trust; Member of a Committee, Ministry of Social Justice and Empowerment, Government of India (for selection of institutes/organizations for disbursement of grants for tribal art and culture); Member, Executive Council, Gauhati University; Member, Executive Council, Dibrugarh University; Member, Board of Management, Krishna Kanta Handiqui State Open University; Consultant for the National Council of Educational Research and Training project on State Studies in School Education (for the state of Assam); Chairman, Zonal Committee of Council of Boards of Secondary Education (COBSE), North East Zone; Chairman, Executive Committee, Anundoram Borooah Institute of Language, Art and Culture; Founder President, Mising Agom Kebang (Mising Sahitya Sabha), 1972–1980.

== Research works ==
Tabu Ram Taid has been active in preserving his native tribal language, Mising. In 1972, he founded the Mising Agom Kebang (Linguistic Society of the Mising), serving until 1980 as its president. The organization helped reintroduce the language into primary schools. He has published a number of papers about the Mising language as well as an orthography and dictionary of the language, and he has edited collections of Mising folk songs.

He has contributed three research papers on the Mising language published in the journal, 'Linguistics of the Tibeto-Burman Area', University of California, Berkeley, USA. 1987 and 1995.

== Authorship and editorial work ==
Tabu Taid authored a series of lessons in English for school students which have been broadcast over radio multiple times since the mid-1970s. He has also authored a number of English textbooks for elementary students and several key volumes about Mising, Mising Bhaxar Banan Poddhoti (an orthography) and Mising Gompir Kumsung (a 900-page dictionary).

He has written widely in periodicals in Assamese, English and his native tribal language, Mising. There are two volumes of his collected articles, Ekunki Nibondho (Bouquet of Articles) and Glimpses. 'Banikanta Kakati, the Man and his Works' was compiled and edited by Prof. Tabu Ram Taid and Prof. Ranjit Kumar Dev Goswami in 1987 and published by the Publication Board, Assam. He authored 'A Dictionary of the Mising Language' which was the very first dictionary of the Mising language (published in 1995 by an association of Mising language teachers). His 'Mising Folk Tales' was published by the Sahitya Akademi in 2013.

The Government of Assam bestowed a literary pension on him to recognize his contributions to literature.

== Honors and awards ==
Prof. Tabu Ram Taid was honored with the title of 'Agom Migang' conferred by the Mising Agom Kebang (Mising Sahitya Sabha) in 2007.

He was awarded the prestigious ‘Bhasha Samman Award’ by the Sahitya Akademi for his contributions to Mising language and literature, in 2010. The Sahitya Akademi instituted 'Bhasha Samman' in 1996 to be given to writers, scholars, editors, collectors, performers or translators who have made considerable contribution to the propagation, modernization or enrichment of various Indian languages. The awards are given to three or four persons every year in different Indian languages on the basis of recommendation of experts' committees constituted for the purpose.

Mr. Tabu Taid was conferred the Sukapha Award 2011–2012, by the Department of Cultural Affairs, Government of Assam, in recognition of his valuable contribution to education, literature, culture, scholarly work, linguistics, arts, authorship and public service. He was presented with the award on 2 December 2011, by the Chief Minister of the State, Mr Tarun Gogoi in a ceremony held in Dibrugarh, Assam.

The ‘Basudev Jalan Award’, 2012, was awarded to Prof. Tabu Ram Taid by the Asam Sahitya Sabha. The award is conferred on an individual who has contributed towards the growth of language, literature and culture of the ethnic communities in the region.

Prof. Tabu Taid was honored with the title ‘Axom Shreshtho 2015’ for his lifelong contribution to Education in the state of Assam. The 'Axom Shreshtho 2015' awards are an endeavor of The Telegraph (Calcutta) to celebrate and honor eminent people who have made the state of Assam proud.
