= Sonari Assembly constituency =

Constituency of the Assam legislative assembly in India

Sonari
- Constituency No. 93 for the Assam Legislative Assembly

Constituency details
- Country: India
- Region: Northeast India
- State: Assam
- District: Charaideo
- Lok Sabha constituency: Jorhat
- Established: 1951
- Reservation: None

Member of Legislative Assembly
- 16th Assam Legislative Assembly
- Incumbent Dharmeswar Konwar
- Party: Bharatiya Janata Party
- Elected year: 2026

Sonari Assembly constituency is one of the 126 assembly constituencies of Assam Legislative Assembly. Sonari forms part of the Jorhat Lok Sabha constituency.

== Members of Legislative Assembly ==
Election	Member	Party affiliation
1951	Purnananda Chetia	Indian National Congress
1957	Purnananda Chetia	Indian National Congress
1962	Bimala Prasad Chaliha	Indian National Congress
1967	Bimala Prasad Chaliha	Indian National Congress
1972	Janakinath Handique	Indian National Congress
1978	Satya Tanti	Indian National Congress
1983	Satya Tanti	Indian National Congress
1985	Bhadreswar Buragohain	Independent
1985	Bhadreswar Buragohain	Asom Gana Parishad
1991	Sarat Barkotoky	Indian National Congress
1996	Sarat Barkotoky	Indian National Congress
2001	Sarat Barkotoky	Indian National Congress
2006	Sarat Barkotoky	Indian National Congress
2011	Sarat Barkotoky	Indian National Congress
2016	Topon Kumar Gogoi	Bharatiya Janata Party
2019^	Nabanita Handique	Bharatiya Janata Party
2021	Dharmeswar Konwar	Bharatiya Janata Party

^ Indicates Bye-Elections

== Election results ==
=== 2026 ===
2026 Assam Legislative Assembly election: Sonari
Party	Candidate	Votes	%	±%
NDA	Dharmeswar Konwar	74833	52.06	
INC	Utpal Gogoi	50699	35.27	
JMM	Baldev Teli	14579	10.14	
NOTA	NOTA	2126	1.48	
Margin of victory		24134		
Turnout		143747		
Rejected ballots				
Registered electors				
BJP hold		Swing		

=== 2019 by-election ===
By-election, 2019: Sonari
Party	Candidate	Votes	%	±%
BJP	Nabanita Handique	66,698		
INC	Sushil Kumar Suri	51,268		
Majority		15,430		
Turnout		1,22,209	71.64	
BJP hold		Swing		
