= Bhubon Pegu =

Indian politician

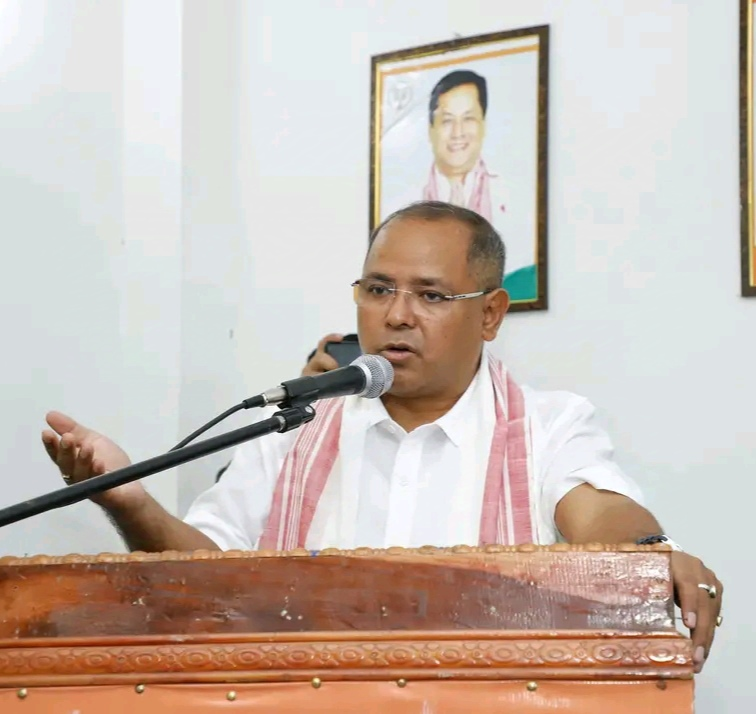
- Pegu

Member of Assam Legislative Assembly
- Incumbent
- Assumed office 19 May 2016
- Preceded by: Pradan Baruah
- Constituency: Jonai

Member of Assam Legislative Assembly
- In office 2006–2011
- Preceded by: Pradan Baruah
- Succeeded by: Pradan Baruah
- Constituency: Jonai

General Secretary of Takam Mising Porin Kebang
- In office 1999–2001
- Preceded by: Purushotam Doley
- Succeeded by: Raju Medok

Personal details
- Born: 20 December 1970 (age 55)
- Party: Bharatiya Janata Party
- Parent: Khagen Pegu (father)
- Education: Gauhati University (MA) Cotton University (BA)
- Occupation: Politician
- Profession: Social Worker and Farming

Bhubon Pegu (born 20 December 1970) is an Indian politician for the Bharatiya Janata Party from the Indian state of Assam. He was elected in the Assam Legislative Assembly election in 2006 and 2016 from Jonai constituency. In 2020, he joined BJP. He is a three time Member of the Assam Legislative Assembly from Jonai. Currently he is a Member of the Assam Legislative Assembly from Jonai constituency of Assam since 2021.
