= Nabanita Handique =

Indian politician

Chairperson, Assam State Development Corporation for Other Backward Classes Limited
- Incumbent
- Assumed office 3 November 2021
- Chief Minister: Himanta Biswa Sarma

Member, Assam Legislative Assembly
- In office 24 October 2019 – 2 May 2021
- Preceded by: Topon Kumar Gogoi
- Succeeded by: Dharmeswar Konwar
- Constituency: Sonari

Personal details
- Party: Bharatiya Janata Party

Nabanita Handique is an Indian politician from Assam. She was elected to the Assam Legislative Assembly from Sonari in the 2019 by election as a member of the Bharatiya Janata Party. By-elections happen due to Topon Kumar Gogoi elected to Parliament.
