= Sonari =

- City
- Location in Assam, India Sonari (India)
- Coordinates: 27.07°N 95.03°E
- Country: India
- State: Assam
- District: Charaideo

Government
  - Body: Sonari Municipality Board
- Elevation: 97 m (318 ft)

Population (2011)
  - Total: 27,430

Languages
  - Official: AssameseTai
- Time zone: UTC+5:30 (IST)
- Postal code: 785690
- ISO 3166 code: IN-AS
- Vehicle registration: AS 33

Sonari (IPA: ˈsəʊnɑːrɪ / Assamese: [xʊnaɹi]) is a city and headquarters of the Charaideo district (by Chief Minister Mr. Tarun Gogoi on 15 August 2015) in the Indian state of Assam.

== Tourist Destinations ==
There are several unexplored destinations of tourism. For instance the mension of famous Assamese poet, lyricist and dramatist Late Parvati Prasad Baruah, The Sonari Shiva Temple, The Sonari Mosque, The Town Auditorium, The Shani Temple, etc.

== Geography ==
Sonari is located at 27.07°N 95.03°E. It has an average elevation of 97 metres (318 feet). It is a major town on the nearly 500-year-old "Dhodar Ali" built by the Ahom Kings. Dhodar ali was forcefully commissioned by Ahom king Gadadhar Singha using the so-called lazy people or the socially unproductive 'Dhods' residing within Assam. Situated by the side of the Taokak river, Sonari is the headquarters of Charaideo District, Assam. The nearest railway station is Bhojo, which is about 3 km away located by the bank of historical Disang River. The best way to reach Sonari by road is from Sivasagar town through the Dhodar Ali near which the famous royal mausoleum of the Ahom Kings at Charaideo is situated. Sonari is a centre for tea and timber industries and is the gateway to the Mon district of Nagaland.

== History ==
It is claimed that the original name of Sonari was Sonapur. It is also believed that Sutamla rested for days in Sonari before proceeding to Namrup during the invasion of Assam and Ahom capital by Aurangzeb's general Mir Jumlah during 1663. One of the first two tea estates set up by Maniram Dewan has now been discovered by Dr Pradip Baruah of the Tocklai Experimental Station of the Tea Research Association. Dewan established the Cinnamara TE at Jorhat and Senglung TE near Suffry, Sonari, around 169 years back, in 1845. Maniram Dewan was the first Indian commercial tea planter. In the middle of the town there is a park around a historic Ahom Kingdom's tank called Bor Pukhuri. This park near the post office is now called Lachit Nagar park, since a full size statue of Assam's great general from Ahom period is erected here. Similarly a statue of Koch General Chilarai has been erected near Tawkak river bridge while entering the town. In 2004 during the birth centenary of Geetikavi Parvati Prasad Baruva a bust size white statue of this lyrical poet was inaugurated at Sonari.

== Demographics ==
As of 2001 India census, Sonari had a population of 17,430. Males constitute 55% of the population and females 45%. Sonari has an average literacy rate of 92%, higher than the national average of 59.5%: male literacy is 79% and female literacy is 72%. In Sonari, 12% of the population is under 6 years of age.

=== Languages ===
Languages spoken in Sonari town (2011)
1. Assamese (65.8%)
2. Bengali (21.8%)
3. Hindi (11.1%)
4. Others (1.29%)

Sonari town have a population of 154,296 as per 2011 census. Assamese is Spoken by 11,475 people, Bengali at 3,797, Hindi at 1,934 and Bhojpuri by 1,474 people.

== Importance ==
Sonari is one of the most important towns in eastern Assam. It is a commercial center for Charaideo District. There is a Sub-Divisional Court and an S.D.O. court at Rajadhap. There are several tea gardens around Sonari and a Gymkhana club golf course. Built sometime around 1945 this golf course was created by the tea planters. The golf course is 1.5 km away from the Sonari Gymkhana, and as a whole about 5 km away from the centre of Sonari Town. There are dramatic changes in elevation on this course which make it interesting. This course is part of the NAPUK tea estate. Assam Chah Mazdoor Sangha, Sonari Branch is Affiliated to INTUC No. IV/2211 of 1959 and Registration no.445

In the Middle of the town there is a park around a historic Ahom Kingdom's tank called Bor Pukhuri.

There is a Daily Super market in the middle of the town. Produces from nearby villages like Mahmora, kakatibari are sold near this market.

There are educational institutions in the town, catering the needs of many nearby villages and tea-gardens. Some of them are: Sonari College, B.P.B.M. Higher Secondary School, P.K.B. Girls HS School, Sankardev Shishu Niketan, Sonari Town High School, Haji OMM school, St. Joseph's High School, Sonari Junior College, Chah Mazdoor Vidya Niketan, Sonari Commerce College, etc. Notably, B.P.B.M.H.S.School recently completed her Diamond Jubilee year and St. Joseph's High School completed her Silver Jubilee year. Sonari has Hindi school for many years now. There is a Sub-divisional public library near sonari college as well. there are religious places of worship like Sarbojanin Naam ghar, Gurudwara Sahib, Hari Mandir, Kali Mandir, Shiv Mandir, Shani Mandir, Mosque, Buddha Mandir, Hanuman mandir etc.

In recent years a 100 bedded sub-divisional civil hospital has been created in the outskirt of the city with funds from the Government of Assam and the North-Eastern Council (N.E.C) with additional support from N.R.H.M. Project. The government of Assam received Rs.417.31 lakhs from the NorthEastern Council (NEC) for up-gradation of Sonari Civil Hospital. Some of the famous people from sonari are Lyrical-Poet "Geetikavi" Parvati Prasad Baruwa, Poet 'Kavita Konwar' Ambeswar Chetia Phukan etc. Parvati Prasad Baruwa(1904–1964) was a tea planter, poet, lyricist, dramatist: an icon of Assamese culture and literature.

Sonari town is located about 45 km from the historic town of Sivasagar and roughly located between Sivasagar and Namrup Town. Bhojo, the nearest railway station is well connected by major passenger trains like intercity. Distance from Dibrugarh Mohanbari Airport to Sonari is about 77 km.

The town has a police station of its own name right in the centre of the town. There is also a jail at the outskirts of the town. The Pin code of Sonari is 785690 and the STD code 03772.

== Education ==
=== College ===
- Sonari College,
- Sonari Commerce College,
- Sonari Senior Secondary School
- Elite Academy,
- Sukafa Academy,
- Hajee Osimuddin Mission Academy,
- Charaideo Medical College,
- Signor Academy
- Dibyalata ideal academy

=== Schools ===
Sonari is known for its best eminent scholars. Sonari has good number of educational institutes. Schools provides education in both Assamese and English medium. Most of the school follows syllabus of Secondary Education Board of Assam, other follows Central Board of Secondary Education (CBSE). For Higher Secondary (10+2) both schools follows syllabus of Assam Higher Secondary Education Council (AHSEC).

== Transportation ==
=== Road ===
Sonari is well connected with Sivasagar, Namrup, Dibrugarh, Mon District of Nagaland by road. The historic Dhodar Ali passes through the town connecting Namrup towards east, Simaluguri; Nazira; Joysagar towards west.

=== Rail ===
Nearest railway station is Bhojo which is 6 km away from the town and easily approachable. To reach Bhojo railway station, there is an Auto (three wheeler) Stand near Bhojo ChariAli at Sonari Town. Nearest junction is Simaluguri Junction.

=== Air ===
Although Sonari lacks an airport, Dibrugarh Airport (77 km) and Jorhat Airport (80 km) serve the town. IndiGo and Air India regularly fly to both the airports.

=== Transportation in town ===
Most of the places are easily communicable by walk and bicycle. Rickshaw and Electronic Rickshaw facilities are available within the town, there are also some tea estates near Sonari.

== Politics ==
Sonari is part of Jorhat (Lok Sabha constituency). The present MP is Mr. Gaurav Gogoi from the INC, who replaced Topon Kumar Gogoi (BJP) who was the MP from 2019. Nabanita Handique of BJP is the incumbent MLA from Sonari (Vidhan Sabha constituency). Sarat Borkataky, Bhadreswar Buragohain, Satya Tanti were some earlier MLAs.

Dharmeshwar Konwar of BJP is the incumbent MLA from Sonari (Vidhan Sabha constituency). Nabanita Handique, Sarat Borkataky, Bhadreswar Buragohain, Satya Tanti were some earlier MLAs.

== Telecommunication ==
Sonari has landline, mobile and internet connectivity. Internet connectivity through wireless data cards and Broadband is available. The major cellular service providers are BSNL, Airtel, Vodafone, Idea, Reliance and jio. 3G/4G services are available in the town.

== Health care ==
Sonari is little underdeveloped regarding health services. In spite of patient flow from nearby state Nagaland only a handful doctors are available for the service. Any serious cases are frequently referred to Assam Medical College, Dibrugarh or Jorhat Medical College and Hospital, Jorhat. A medical college is underconstruction that will be known as Charaideo Medical College and hospital, Sonari.

- Civil Hospital, Rajapukhuri
- Community Health Centre (CHC)
- Kanaklata Memorial Nursing Home
- P.B Hospital & Diagnostic Research centre
- Charaideo Medical College
