= Paramananda Chayengia =

Indian politician (born 1960)

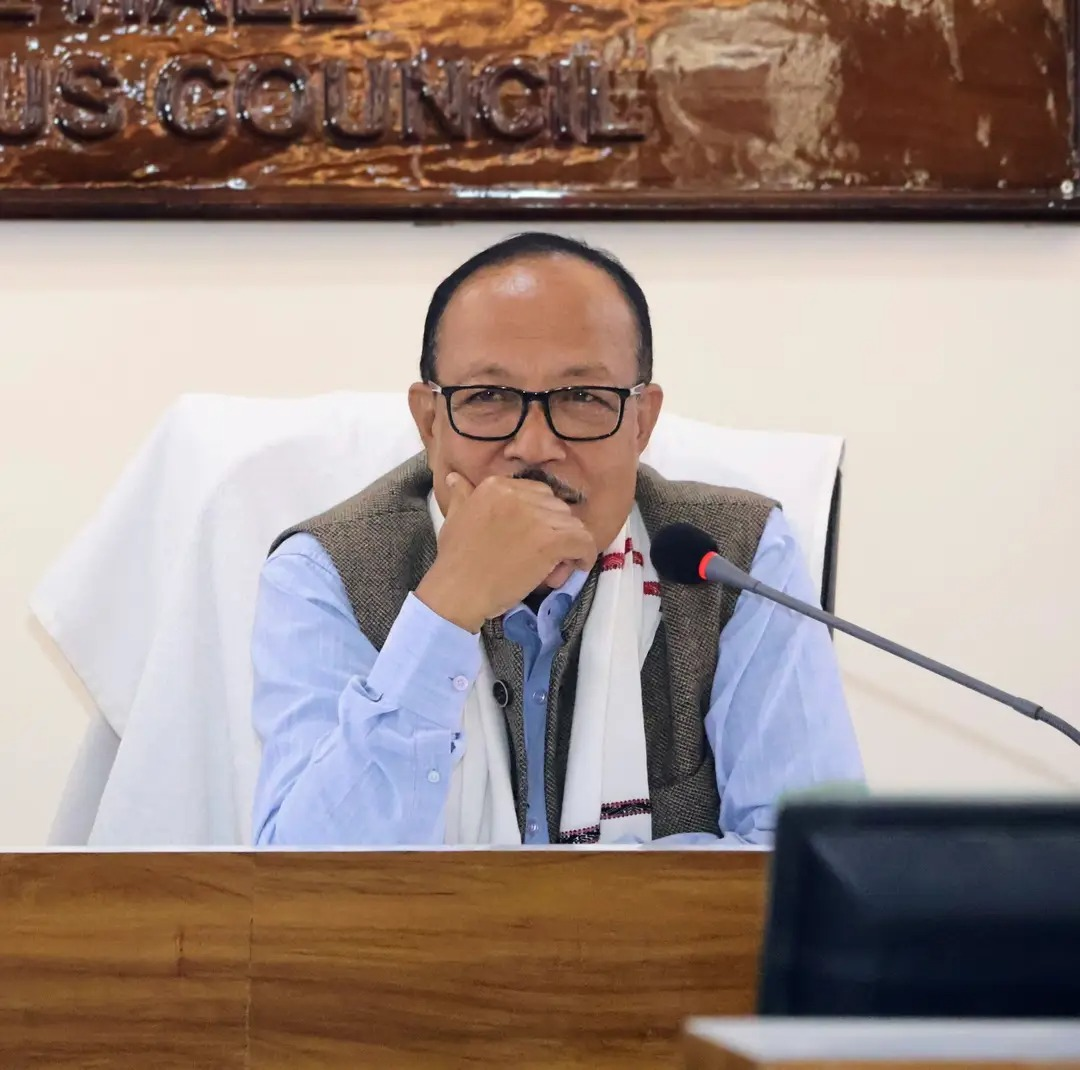
- MAC Chief

Chief Executive Member of the Mising Autonomous Council
- Incumbent
- Assumed office 2019
- Preceded by: Ranoj Pegu
- Constituency: Mingmang

President of the Sanmilita Gana Shakti
- Incumbent
- Assumed office 2006
- Preceded by: Party established

President of the Takam Mising Porin Kebang
- In office 1993–1995
- Preceded by: Hari Narayan Pegu
- Succeeded by: Jukta Nath Kumbang

Personal details
- Born: 17 January 1960 (age 66)
- Party: Sanmilita Gana Shakti
- Other political affiliations: North-East Democratic Alliance
- Parent: Dandiram Chayengia
- Education: Panjab University
- Website: sanmilitaganashaktiasom.org

Paramananda Chayengia (born 1960) is an Indian politician from Assam serving as the chief executive councilor of the Mising Autonomous Council. He is the president of the Sanmilita Gana Shakti. He is a former president of the Takam Mising Porin Kebang.

== Early life ==
Paramananda Chayengia is the son of Dandiram Chayengia. He was born in present-day Arunachal Pradesh, where both his father and mother were employed professionally. He graduated from Panjab University in 1984. He is a resident of Dhemaji, Assam.

== Political career ==
Chayengia was the president of the Takam Mising Porin Kebang from 1993 to 1995. In 1996, Chayengia contested from Dhakuakhana Assembly constituency, placing third as an independent candidate. The Sanmilita Gana Shakti was formed by the 2006 assembly elections as the political vehicle of the Takam Mising Porin Kebang. In 2009, Chayengia was serving as the head of the Mising Autonomous Council (MAC) while leading an alliance of the Sanmilita Gana Shakti and the Indian National Congress. In 2013, the SGS won a majority of seats in the MAC elections, and refuted reports that they were supported by the Indian National Congress. Chayengia was elected chairman of the Mising Autonomous Council. In 2016, Chayengia contested from Dhemaji Assembly constituency as an independent, placing third. In 2019, the Sanmilita Gana Shakti won a majority of seats in the Mising Autonomous Council, and Chayengia was elected chief executive councilor at the head of a coalition involving the Bharatiya Janata Party.
