= Dhemaji Assembly constituency =

Constituency of the Assam legislative assembly in India

Dhemaji
- Constituency No. 78 for the Assam Legislative Assembly

Constituency details
- Country: India
- Region: Northeast India
- State: Assam
- District: Dhemaji
- Lok Sabha constituency: Lakhimpur
- Established: 1967
- Reservation: ST

Dhemaji Assembly constituency is one of the 126 assembly constituencies of Assam a north east state of India. Dhemaji is also part of Lakhimpur Lok Sabha constituency. It is a reserved seat for the Scheduled tribes (ST).

== Details ==
Following are details on Dhemaji Assembly constituency:

- Country: India.
- State: Assam.
- District: Dhemaji district .
- Lok Sabha Constituency: Lakhimpur Lok Sabha constituency.
- Area Includes: Dhemaji MB, Bordoloni Dev. Block(Part), Dhemaji Dev. Block(Part), Machkhowa Dev. Block(Part).

== Members of Legislative Assembly ==
Election	Member	Party
1967	Romesh Mohon Kuli	Swatantra Party
1972	Romesh Mohon Kuli	Swatantra Party
1978	Purna Chandra Bora	Independent
1983	Durgeswar Patir	Indian National Congress
1985	Dilip Kumar Saikia	Independent
1991	Dilip Kumar Saikia	Asom Gana Parishad
1996	Dilip Kumar Saikia	Asom Gana Parishad
2001	Dilip Kumar Saikia	Asom Gana Parishad
2006	Sumitra Patir	Indian National Congress
2011	Sumitra Patir	Indian National Congress
2016	Pradan Baruah	Bharatiya Janata Party
2017^	Ranoj Pegu	Bharatiya Janata Party
2021	Ranoj Pegu	Bharatiya Janata Party
2026	Ranoj Pegu	Bharatiya Janata Party

^ Indicates Bye-Elections

== Election Results ==
=== 2026 ===
2026 Assam Legislative Assembly election: Dhemaji
Party	Candidate	Votes	%	±%
BJP	Dr. Ranoj Pegu	83,649	58.51	
INC	Sailen Sonowal	51,420	35.96	
AITC	Narendra Kumar Paw	3,550	2.48	
Independent	Babul Sonowal	1,675	1.17	
SUCI(C)	Lilimai Doley	394	0.28	
NOTA	None of the above	1,197	0.84	
Margin of victory		32,229		
Turnout		142,976		
Registered electors				
BJP hold		Swing		

=== 2021 ===
2021 Assam Legislative Assembly election: Dhemaji
Party	Candidate	Votes	%	±%
BJP	Ranoj Pegu	87,681	45.33	−4.8
AJP	Chittaranjan Basumatary	56,889	29.41	N/A
INC	Sailen Sonowal	44,832	23.18	−20.77
Independent	Ayub Khang Brahma	1,209	0.63	N/A
SUCI(C)	Hem Kanta Miri	1,158	0.6	−0.21
NOTA	None of the above	1,643	0.85	+0.2
Majority		30,792	15.92	+9.74
Turnout		1,93,412	77.97	+9.88
Registered electors		2,48,047		
BJP hold		Swing		

=== 2017 by-election ===
A by-election was held in 2017 to fill the vacancy created by Pradan Baruah's election as MP for Lakhimpur

2017 by-election: Dhemaji
Party	Candidate	Votes	%	±%
BJP	Ranoj Pegu	75,217	50.13	+9.24
INC	Babul Sonowal	65,932	43.95	+14.29
CPI(M)	Jadu Hazarika	4,944	3.30	+1.05
Independent	Raj Kumar Doley	1,347	0.90	−0.37
SUCI(C)	Hem Kanta Miri	1,218	0.81	+0.51
NOTA	None of the above	1,371	0.91	+0.08
Majority		9,285	6.18	−5.05
Turnout		1,50,029	68.09	−12.60
Registered electors		2,20,332		
BJP hold		Swing		

=== 2016 ===
2016 Assam Legislative Assembly election: Dhemaji
Party	Candidate	Votes	%	±%
BJP	Pradan Baruah	69,592	40.89	−12.24
INC	Sumitra Patir	50,471	29.66	−12.98
Independent	Paramananda Chayengia	21,874	12.85	N/A
Independent	Sailen Sonowal	16,548	9.72	N/A
CPI(M)	Gandheswar Borah	3,830	2.25	N/A
LDP	Kiranban Deori	2,456	1.44	N/A
Independent	Rajkumar Doley	2,173	1.27	N/A
LJP	Durgeswar Patir	1,275	0.74	N/A
SUCI(C)	Hem Kanta Miri	524	0.30	−0.67
NOTA	None of the above	1,417	0.83	N/A
Majority		19,121	11.23	+6.02
Turnout		1,70,160	80.69	+4.61
Registered electors		2,10,865		
BJP gain from INC		Swing		

=== 2011 ===
2011 Assam Legislative Assembly election: Dhemaji
Party	Candidate	Votes	%	±%
INC	Sumitra Patir	59,633	42.64	
AGP	Parmananda Sonowal	52,348	37.43	
BJP	Sailen Sonowal	21,957	15.70	
AITC	Khadagraj Pegu	2,792	2.00	
SUCI(C)	Hem Kanta Miri	1,357	0.97	
AIFB	Dimple Sonowal	1,168	0.84	
SAP	Lalit Narah	604	0.43	
Majority		7,285	5.21	
Turnout		1,39,859	76.08	
Registered electors		1,83,823		
INC hold		Swing		

== See also ==
- Dhemaji
- List of constituencies of Assam Legislative Assembly
