= Ranoj Pegu =

Indian politician

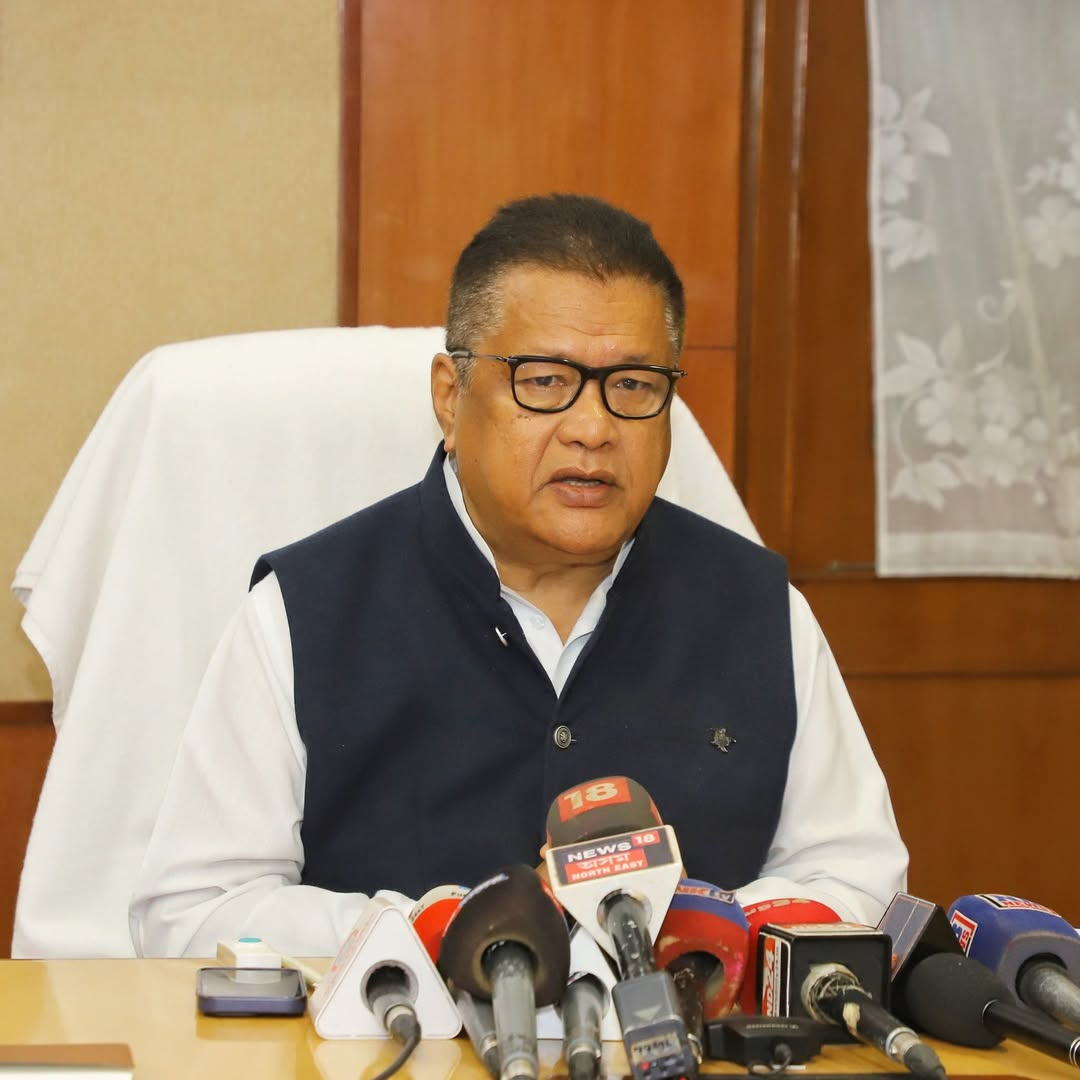

Cabinet Minister, Assam
- Incumbent
- Assumed office 5 June 2026
- Chief Minister: Himanta Biswa Sarma
- Departments: School Education; Higher Education; Tribal Affairs (Plain); Information Technology

Cabinet Minister, Assam
- In office 10 May 2021 – 11 May 2026
- Chief Minister: Himanta Biswa Sarma
- Departments: Minister of Education (2021–2026); Minister of Welfare of Plan Tribes and Backward Classes (2021–2026); Minister of Indigenous and Tribal Faith and Culture (Library and Museum) (2022–2024)

Member of Assam Legislative Assembly
- Incumbent
- Assumed office 19 April 2017
- Preceded by: Pradan Baruah
- Constituency: Dhemaji

Chief Executive Member of the Mising Autonomous Council
- In office 2013–2017
- Succeeded by: Paramananda Chayengia

Personal details
- Born: 12 February 1962 (age 64)
- Party: Bharatiya Janata Party
- Parent: Sishuram Pegu (father)
- Education: Guwahati Medical College and Hospital
- Occupation: Politician, Physician
- Known for: Minister of Education, Plain Tribes and Information Technology

Ranoj Pegu (born 12 February 1962) is an Indian politician serving as the Minister of Education, Plain Tribes and Information Technology of Assam. He is a three time member of the Assam Legislative Assembly from the Dhemaji constituency since 2017.

== Early life and education ==
Ranoj Pegu was born on 12 February 1962. He completed his matriculation from Sankardev Seminary, Jorhat in 1978 and his pre-university studies from North Lakhimpur College in 1982. He obtained his MBBS degree from Guwahati Medical College and Hospital under Gauhati University in 1987.

== Political career ==
Dr. Pegu's political career began with tribal activism. He advocated for the demand of the Sixth Schedule for the Mising people. He served as the first democratically elected Chief Executive Member of the Mising Autonomous Council from 2013–2017.

In March 2017, Pegu joined the Bharatiya Janata Party (BJP) and was welcomed by Himanta Biswa Sarma. He contested the assembly by-election for the Dhemaji seat on 9 April 2017, which was vacated due to previous BJP MLA, Pradhan Baruah. Pegu won the seat for the BJP and subsequently assumed office.

In the 2021 Assam Legislative Assembly elections, Pegu was re-elected from Dhemaji constituency. On 10 May 2021, he was sworn in as a Cabinet Minister in Himanta Biswa Sarma led government.
