= Sumitra Patir =

Indian politician

Sumitra Doley Patir
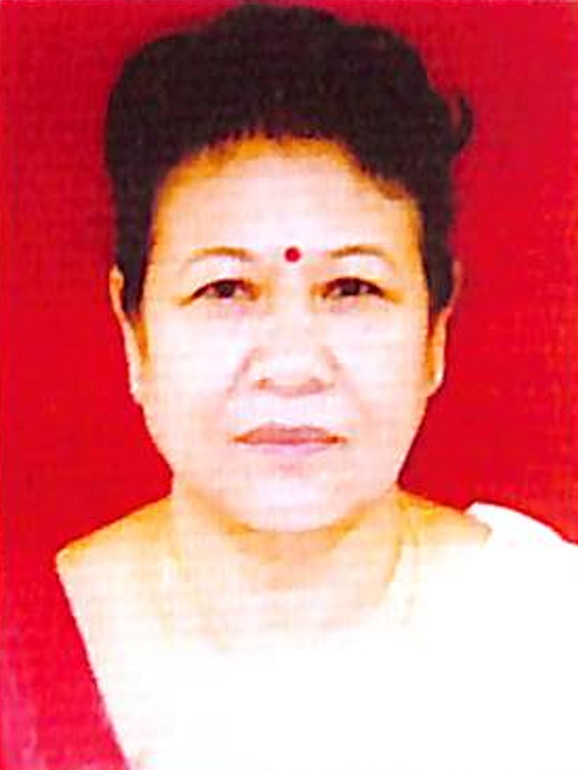

Minister of State (Independent Charge), Assam
- In office 26 January 2015 – 24 May 2016
- Chief Minister: Tarun Gogoi
- Departments: Urban Development and Housing; Tourism; Tribal Welfare
- Preceded by: Ajanta Neog (UD&H); Tarun Gogoi (Tourism)
- Succeeded by: Atul Bora (UD&H); Himanta Biswa Sarma (Tourism); Pramila Rani Brahma (Tribal Welfare)

Member, Assam Legislative Assembly
- In office 13 May 2006 – 19 May 2016
- Preceded by: Dilip Kumar Saikia
- Succeeded by: Pradan Baruah
- Constituency: Dhemaji

Personal details
- Party: Bharatiya Janata Party (since 2017)
- Other political affiliations: Indian National Congress (until 2017)
- Spouse: Late Kalinath Doley

Sumitra Doley Patir is an Indian politician from Assam who served as a member of the Assam Legislative Assembly representing the Dhemaji Assembly constituency from 2006 until 2016. She also served as a Minister of State (Independent Charge) in the third cabinet of chief minister Tarun Gogoi from 26 January 2015 until 24 May 2016, holding portfolios of urban development and housing, tourism and tribal welfare. She belonged to the Indian National Congress until resigning from the party to join the Bharatiya Janata Party in 2017.

In 2006, she was elected to the Assam Legislative Assembly from Dhemaji constituency, defeating her nearest rival and Asom Gana Parishad candidate Paramananda Sonowal. In 2011, she was re-elected from the same constituency, defeating Bharatiya Janata Party's Sailen Sonowal. She contested for re-election from the same constituency in 2016 but was defeated by BJP's Pradan Baruah.

== Personal life ==
Patir is the sister of Aswini Kumar Doley, CEO of Sivasagar Zila Parishad.
