= Takam Mising Porin Kébang =

Student organization in Assam, India

- All Mising Students' Union
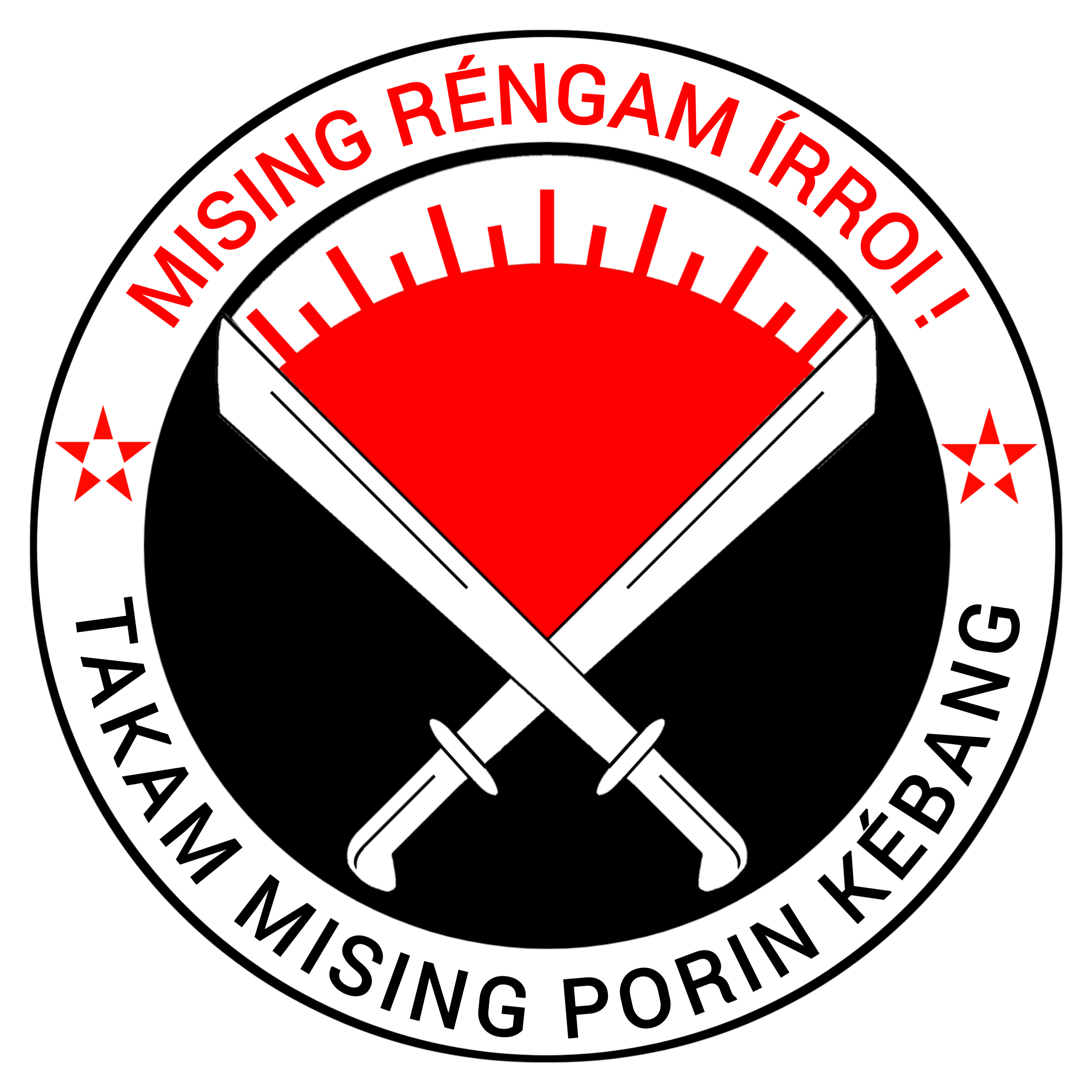
- Emblem of TMPK
- Abbreviation: TMPK
- Formation: 16 October 1971; 54 years ago
- Founded at: Jonai Higher Secondary School, Jonai
- Type: Student organization
- Purpose: Socio-economic; Political issues
- Headquarters: Gogamukh, Dhemaji
- Region served: Assam; Northeast India
- President: Mg. Tilak Doley
- General Secretary: Mg. Shaan Do:nyi Panging
- Parent organization: Mising Bane Kebang
- Formerly called: North East Frontier Agency Students Union

Takam Mising Porin Kébang (TMPK) is a Mising student union from the state of Assam, India. It was established in 1971 at Jonai Higher Secondary School. It has celebrated its 50th year Golden Jubilee in 2021 at Higher Secondary field in Jonai Bazar.

== History ==
Takam Mising Porin Kébang or TMPK is a student union from the state of Assam. It is the main students organization of the Mising tribe in the state. It mainly focuses on the socio-economic and political issues of the Mising tribals in Assam

Takam Mising Porin Kebang (TMPK) was established in 1971. The TMPK earlier known as the North East Frontier Agency Students' Union was constituted at Jonai Higher Secondary School in 1971 and later renamed as the TMPK (All Mising Students' Union) in 1982.

== Demand for inclusion of MAC in the Sixth Schedule ==
TMPK is leading the movement of the Mising tribals demand for the inclusion of the Mising Autonomous Council (MAC) into an Autonomous District as per the sixth schedule of the Constitution of India.

== List of Elected TMPK President & General Secretary ==
Sl. no.	President	General Secretary	Session	Remark
1	Medini Mohan Doley	Sonadhar Patir	1971-76	
2	Ranjit Doley	Sivaram Pegu	1976-82	
3	Hari Narayan Pegu	Pabitra Kumar Pegu	1982-85	
4	Hari Narayan Pegu	Paramananda Chayengia	1985-87	
5	Prahlad Charoh	Paramananda Chayengia	1987-89	
6	Prahlad Charoh	Jukta Nath Kumbang	1987-92	
7	Hari Narayan Pegu	Rama Kt. Pait	1992-93	
8	Paramananda Chayengia	Jukta Nath Kumbang	1993-95	
9	Jukta Nath Kumbang	Purusutam Doley	1995-99	
10	Purusutam Doley	Bhubon Pegu	1999-20	
11	Karmuk Pegu; Sapal Doley	Bhubon Pegu	2000-01	
12	Bhubon Pegu	Raju Medok	2001-01	
13	Mulakanta Pegu	Raju Medok	2001-03	
14	Mulakanta Pegu	Rajdeep Patir	2003-03	
15	Hemeswar Pegu	Johan Doley	2003-06	
16	Hemeswar Pegu	Johan Doley	2006-09	
17	Johan Doley	Indra Kr. Chungkrang	2009-14	
18	Naresh Kumbang	Padmalochan Doley	2014-19	
19	Rajkumar Morang	Tilak Doley	2019-23	
20	Tilak Doley	Shaan Do:nyi Panging	2023-26	
21	Tilak Doley	Shaan Do:nyi Panging	2026-	

== See also ==
- Mising people
- Mising Autonomous Council
- Mising Baptist Kebang
- Mising Agom Kebang
