= Pradan Baruah =

Indian politician (born 1965)

Member of Parliament, Lok Sabha
- Incumbent
- Assumed office 23 May 2019
- Preceded by: Sarbananda Sonowal
- Constituency: Lakhimpur

Member of Legislative Assembly for Dhemaji
- In office 19 May 2016 – 22 November 2016
- Preceded by: Sumitra Patir
- Succeeded by: Ranoj Pegu

Personal details
- Born: 30 April 1965 (age 60) Silapathar, Dhemaji, Assam
- Party: Bharatiya Janata Party
- Spouse: Arunima Baruah
- Children: 2
- Occupation: Social worker politician
- As of 12 December, 2016

Pradan Baruah is an Indian politician who is member of Parliament and elected to 16th Lok Sabha from Lakhimpur seat since November 2016. He won the by-election in November 2016, on a seat vacated by Sarbananda Sonowal, who had resigned in May 2016 after becoming the Chief Minister of Assam. Baruah was earlier the member of Assam Legislative Assembly from Dhemaji Assembly constituency in Dhemaji district.

He is a member of Bharatiya Janata Party. Previously, Baruah was member of Indian National Congress but defected from Congress before the assembly election along with Himanta Biswa Sarma in 2016.
