= Topon Kumar Gogoi =

Indian politician

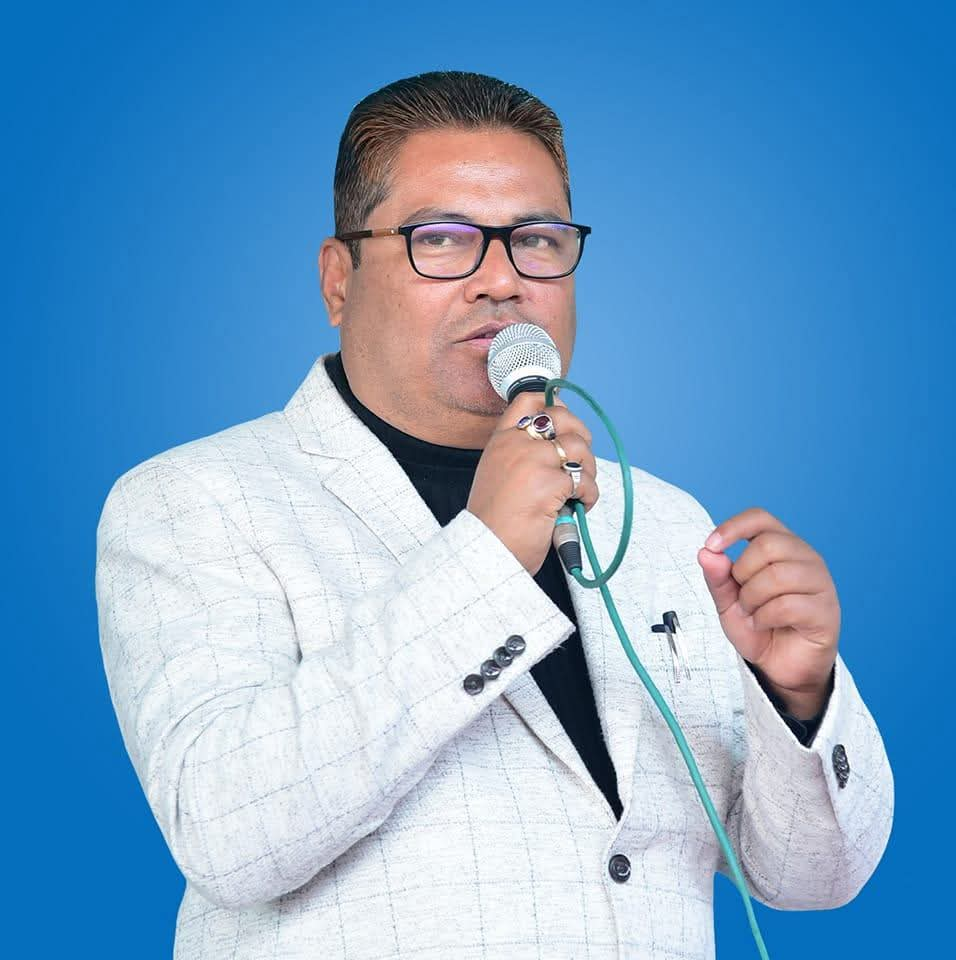
- Gogoi in 2024

Chairman, Assam Industries Development Corporation
- Incumbent
- Assumed office 7 December 2024
- Chief Minister: Himanta Biswa Sarma
- Preceded by: Prasanta Phukan

Member of Parliament, Lok Sabha
- In office 23 May 2019 – 4 June 2024
- Preceded by: Kamakhya Prasad Tasa
- Succeeded by: Gaurav Gogoi
- Constituency: Jorhat

Minister of State, Government of Assam
- In office 26 April 2018 – 4 June 2019
- Chief Minister: Sarbananda Sonowal
- Departments: Power (Ind. charge); Public Works; Health and Family Welfare

Member, Assam Legislative Assembly
- In office 19 May 2016 – 4 June 2019
- Preceded by: Sarat Barkotoky
- Succeeded by: Nabanita Handique
- Constituency: Sonari

Personal details
- Born: 1 March 1969 (age 57) Sapekhati, Sibsagar, Assam
- Party: Bharatiya Janata Party
- Spouse: Binita Saikia Gogoi (m. 2015)
- Children: 2
- Parent: Nagen Gogoi (father) Sarumai Gogoi (mother)
- Occupation: Politician

Topon Kumar Gogoi (born 1 March 1969) is an Indian politician belonging from the Bharatiya Janata Party and was a Member of the Lok Sabha from Jorhat from 2019-2024. He was succeeded by Gaurav Gogoi with a historic margin in the 2024 Lok Sabha elections. He was elected in Assam Legislative Assembly election in 2016 from Sonari constituency. He has previously also been the minister of state for Power (independent charge) in Government of Assam.
