= Langpi Dehangi Rural Bank =

Indian rural bank

Langpi Dehangi Rural Bank (LDRB) was an Indian rural bank (RRB). It was created on 27 January 1982 under Section 3 (1) of Regional Rural Bank Act 1976. It was created under the aegis of the State Bank of India. The main office of the Bank is situated at Diphu, the district headquarters of Karbi Anglong District.

The bank's primary area of operation consists of the Karbi Anglong and Dima Hasao districts in the state of Assam. It is the sole independent RRB in those districts. The Bank has a total network of 59 branches: 33 branches in Karbi Anglong District, 16 branches in West Karbi Anglong and 10 branches in Dima Hasao.
