= Bhadreswar Buragohain =

Indian politician (1947–2020)

Member of Parliament, Rajya Sabha
- In office 10 April 1990 – 9 April 1996
- Constituency: Assam

Deputy Speaker of the Assam Legislative Assembly
- In office 1 April 1986 – 10 April 1990
- Preceded by: N. C. Kath Hazarika
- Succeeded by: Balobhadra Tamuli

Assam Legislative Assembly
- In office 1985–1990
- Preceded by: Satya Tanti
- Succeeded by: Sarat Barkatoky
- Constituency: Sonari

Personal details
- Born: 1947
- Died: 26 February 2020 (aged 74)
- Party: Asom Gana Parishad

Bhadreswar Buragohain (1947 – 26 February 2020) was an Indian politician from Assam belonging to Asom Gana Parishad. He was a member of the Rajya Sabha and Assam Legislative Assembly. He also served as the deputy speaker of the Assam Legislative Assembly too.

== Biography ==
Buragohain was a founding member of the United Liberation Front of Assam. Later, he entered politics.

Buragohain was elected as a member of the Assam Legislative Assembly from Sonari in 1985. He also served as the deputy speaker of the Assam Legislative Assembly from 1 April 1986 to 10 April 1990. Then, he was elected as a member of the Rajya Sabha from Assam in 1990.

Buragohain died on 26 February 2020 at a Guwahati hospital. He was 74.
