= Dhodar Ali =

Road in Assam, India

The Dhodar Ali or Dhudor Ali (Assamese: ধোদৰ আলি, English: Lazy Man's Road or Sluggard's Road), is a 212-km-long road starting from Kamargaon in Golaghat to Joypur in Dibrugarh touching Mariani, Jorhat. It runs through four districts of Upper Assam holding significance for several neighboring states.

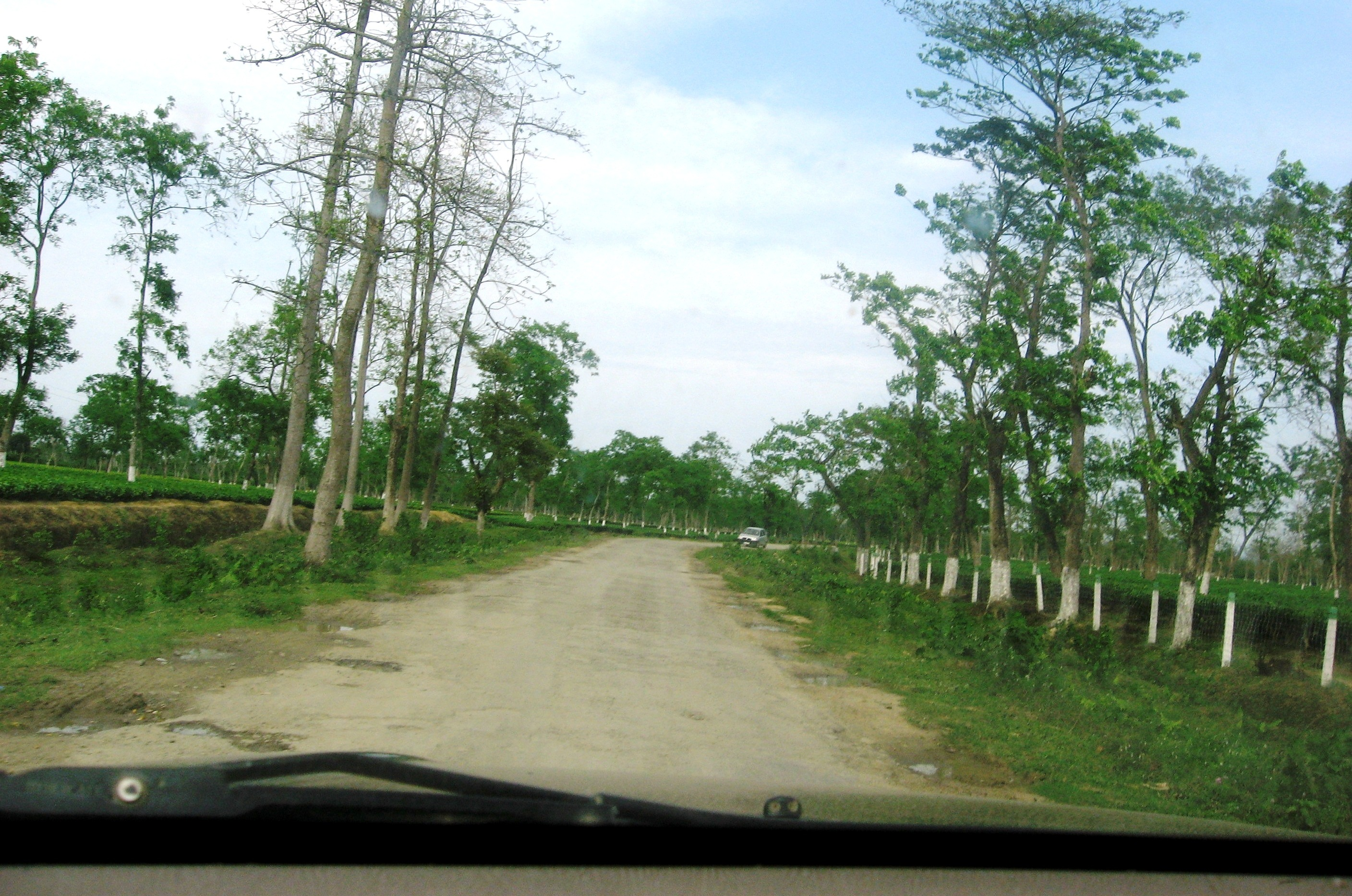
Dhudor Ali

== Construction ==
Ahom king Gadadhar Singha got the road constructed somewhere around 1687. The road is so called because the king mobilized some dhods (dhod in Assamese means lazy) to build it. Those people were said to pretend to be lazy in order to skip royal responsibilities that made the king to deploy them in the construction. King Pratap Singha built a stone bridge over the Dorika river on the road. This Dorika bridge connects Sibsagar to the nearby town Sonari.

== Present condition of the road ==
In 2006, the erosion of the Dhansiri River was said to threaten its existence. In 2009, the state of this historic road was reported to be "deplorable" and full of potholes. A World Bank scheme and the North Eastern Council (NEC)’s simultaneous improvements and construction of a drain on the both side within Sonari is being questioned by public. The construction of the drains is criticised as wastage of money for they will have to be filled up with soil once the construction of the double lane is started.

The Government of Assam, on the other hand, proposed this historic road to be converted into a National Highway. But the Centre turned it down on the ground that there was no plan to declare new National Highways.
