= Dilip Kumar Saikia =

Indian politician

Dilip Kumar Saikia (1953-9 December 2016) was an Asom Gana Parishad politician from Assam. He was elected to Assam Legislative Assembly in elections from 1985 to 2001 from Dhemaji constituency. He expired on 9 December 2016.
