= Sapekhati =

Village in Assam, India

Coordinates: 27°06′40″N 95°09′41″E

Sapekhati, also known as Sapekhati Gaon, is a village in the Charaideo district of Assam, India. According to the 2011 census, it had a population of 1212.

The village was the location of the crash of a B-29 Superfortress bomber during World War II.
