= Bhojo =

Railway station in Assam, India

Bhojo is a village and a railway station in the Charaideo district of the Indian state of Assam.
