= Mising Agom Kébang =

- Abbreviation: MAK
- Formation: 18 April 1972; 54 years ago
- Type: Literary society
- Purpose: Preservation and development of Mising language and literature
- Headquarters: Karichuk, Dhemaji, Assam, India
- Official language: Mising language
- President: Mg. Harinarayan Pegu
- Website: misingagomkebang.org

The Mising Agom Kébang (MAK) is a non-governmental organisation which aims to preserve and develop the Mising language, a language of Assam and Arunachal Pradesh, India. It was established on 18 April 1972 at Disangmukh in the district of Sivasagar, Assam, India. The jurisdiction of MAK is the state of Assam, and it operates through its branches, named Bangke Agom Kébang (BAK).

== History ==
Nahendra Padun, a research student at Gauhati University and Prof. Tabu Taid, a lecturer in English at Cotton University, Guwahati, considered carrying the efforts of the Guwahati Mising Kebang at the level of the Mising community as a whole. They organized an open meeting at Disangmukh, Sibsagar district, Assam on 17 and 18 April 1972. After deliberations, a resolution was adopted in the meeting on 18 April 1972 to set up an organization named Mising Agom Kebang (MAK), with Tabu Ram Taid as its first president and Nahendra Padun as its first secretary.

== Activities ==
The MAK took up the question of a suitable script for the Mising language. After a series of seminars and discussions, it decided to adopt the Roman system of writing for the language with extensive modification in the light of phonetic science and graphology vis-a-vis the phonemics of Mising.

MAK has also launched publications of books and periodicals written in Mising language as well as on Mising language, literature, and culture, beginning with the publication of school primers. MAK also took up with the government of Assam for the introduction of Mising language in the primary schools in Mising villages, and in 1985 the government agreed to do so.

== See also ==
- Mising Baptist Kebang
- Takam Mising Porin Kebang
- Bodo Sahitya Sabha
