= Assam Gramin Bank =

Regional Rural Bank in Assam, India

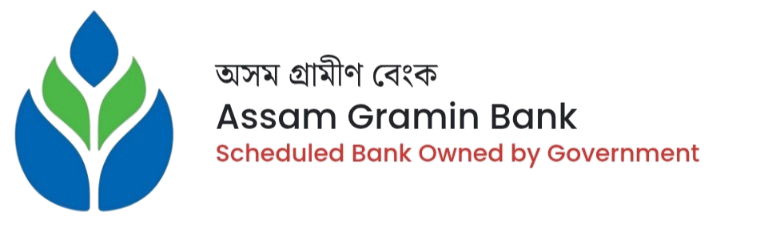
- Native name: অসম গ্রামীণ বেংক
- Formerly: Assam Gramin Vikash Bank (2006–2025)
- Type: Regional Rural Bank
- Industry: Financial; Regional Rural Banks
- Predecessor: Pragjyotish Gaonlia Bank (1976); Lakhimi Gaonlia Bank (1980); Cachar Gramin Bank (1981); Subansiri Gaonlia Bank (1982); Langpi Dehangi Rural Bank (1982)
- Founded: 12 January 2006; 20 years ago
- Headquarters: Guwahati, Assam, India
- Number of locations: 464
- Area served: Assam
- Key people: Vinay Kumar (Chairman); Amlanjyoti Gogoi (General Manager); Shri Lingaraj Luha (General Manager)
- Products: Credit cards, consumer banking, corporate banking, finance and insurance, investment banking, mortgage loans, private banking, private equity, wealth management
- Services: Financial services; Banking
- Owner: Government of India (50%) Government of Assam (15%) Punjab National Bank (35%)
- Parent: Ministry of Finance, Government of India
- Website: agvb.bank.in

Assam Gramin Bank (AGB) is an Indian Regional Rural Bank (RRB) in Assam established on 1 April 2019. The bank was formed by the amalgamation of Assam Gramin Vikash Bank and Langpi Dehangi Rural Bank. It currently has 464 branches in Assam.It is under the ownership of Ministry of Finance, Government of India. It is sponsored by Punjab National Bank & is jointly Owned by the Government of India, Government of Assam and Punjab National Bank. According to Notification No. S.O. 4831(E), the Assam Gramin Vikash Bank has been renamed as Assam Gramin Bank. On the request of its sponsor Punjab National Bank (PNB).

== History ==
As part of the restructuring process initiated in 2005, RRBs sponsored by the same banks were amalgamated to improve operational efficiency. Pragjyotish Gaonlia Bank was the first RRB established in Assam on July 6, 1976. It was sponsored by United Bank of India.

=== Assam Gramin Vikash Bank (2006-2019) ===
Assam Gramin Vikash Bank was a Regional Rural Bank headquartered in Guwahati, India. Govt. of India vide Notification No. F.1. (25)/2005 dated 12 January 2006 established it as a Regional Rural Bank as per Regional Rural Banks Act of 1976. By amalgamation, on 12 January 2006, of the following 4 banks, Pragjyotish Gaonlia Bank (Estd. 06-07-1976), Lakhimi Gaonlia Bank (Estd. 29-07-1980), Cachar Gramin Bank (Estd. 31-03-1981) and Subansiri Gaonlia Bank (Estd. 30-03-1982) sponsored by United Bank of India, to participate more energetically, in the upliftment and development of Rural Farm Sector and Rural Non-Farm Sector. It was under the ownership of Ministry of Finance, Government of India.

=== Langpi Dehangi Rural Bank (1982-2019) ===
Langpi Dehangi Rural Bank (LDRB) was an Indian rural bank (RRB). It was created on 27 January 1982 under Section 3 (1) of Regional Rural Bank Act 1976. under the sponsorship of the State Bank of India. The Head office of the Bank was situated at Diphu, the district headquarters of Karbi Anglong District.

The bank’s primary area of operation consists of the Karbi Anglong and Dima Hasao districts in the state of Assam. It was the sole independent RRB in those districts. The Bank had a total network of 59 branches: 33 branches in Karbi Anglong District, 16 branches in West Karbi Anglong and 10 branches in Dima Hasao.

On 22 February 2019, through Gazette Notification No. 855, the Government of India has amalgamated Assam Gramin Vikash Bank sponsored by United Bank of India and Langpi Dehangi Rural Bank sponsored by State Bank of India into a single Regional Rural Bank named Assam Gramin Vikash Bank. This new entity is sponsored by United Bank of India, and its head office is located in Guwahati. Assam Gramin Vikash Bank (AGVB) has come into existence from 1 April 2019 with its strong network of 473 branches. Further after amalgamation of United Bank of India with Punjab National Bank, the sponsorship of the bank has gone to Punjab National Bank w.e.f 1 April 2020.

On 23 October 2025, Ministry of Finance, Government of India announce the renaming of several Regional Rural Banks (RRBs) to simplify their names and align them with their states. Changes include Assam Gramin Vikash Bank becoming Assam Gramin Bank and several others being renamed after requests from their sponsor banks. The functional jurisdiction and operations of these banks remain unchanged.

== Bank structure ==
The bank has three tier structure consisting of Head Office at Adam's Plaza,1st and 2nd Floor, Christianbasti,Guwahati, 9(nine) Regional offices and 464 branches. They are: Nalbari, Golaghat, Lakhimpur, Guwahati, Dibrugarh, Kokrajhar, Silchar, Tezpur and Diphu. Among these offices there are 464 branches operation across all 34 districts of Assam through which the bank is serving its customers.

== See also ==
- Banking in India
- List of banks in India
- Reserve Bank of India
- Regional Rural Bank
- Indian Financial System Code
- List of largest banks
- List of companies of India
- Make in India
