= Silapathar =

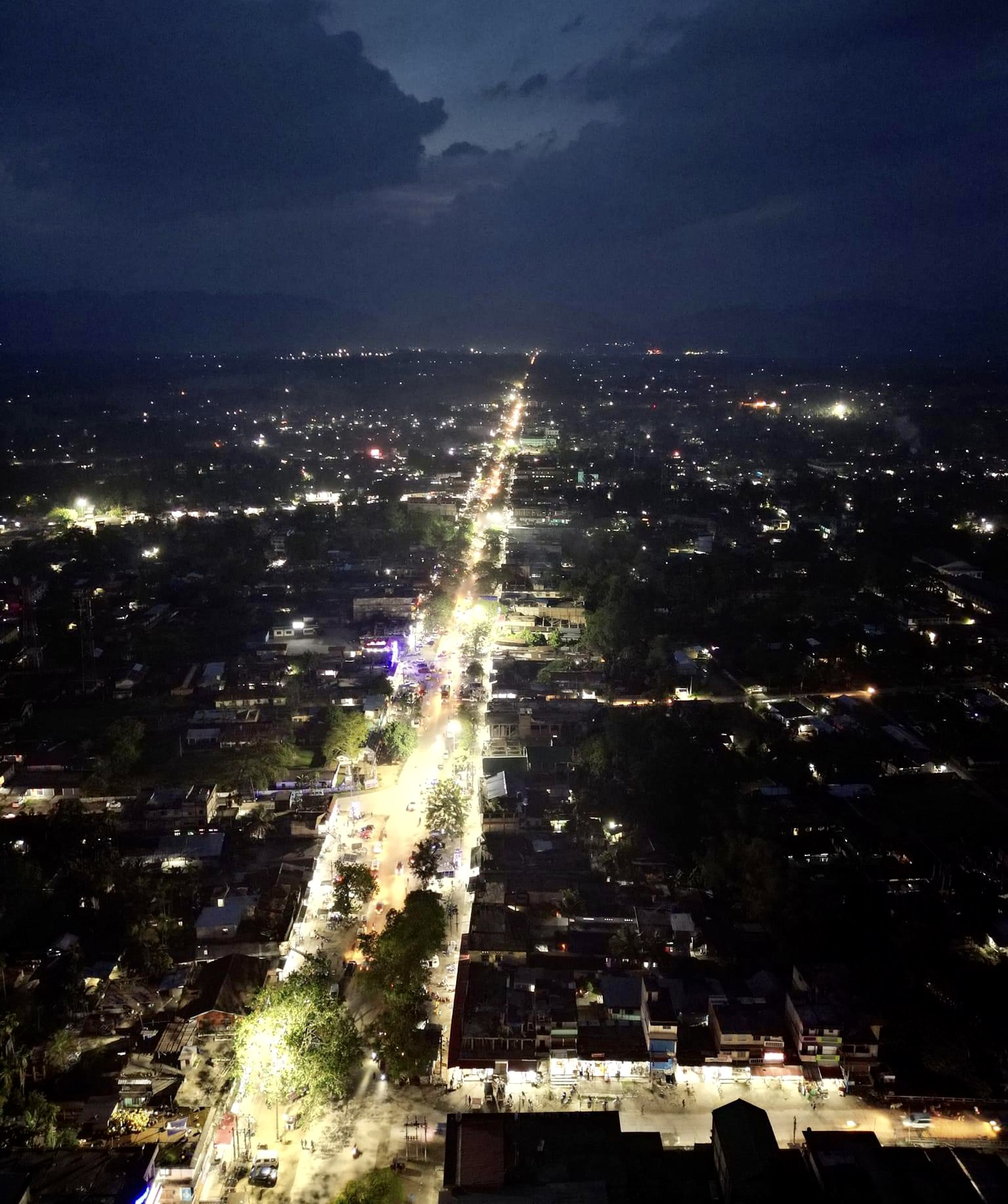
- City
- Silapathar Town
- Nickname: SLP
- Location in Assam, India Silapathar (India)
- Coordinates: 27°35′43″N 94°43′12″E
- Country: India
- State: Assam
- District: Dhemaji
- Silapathar Town Committee: 1991

Government
  - Body: Silapathar Municipal Board

Population (2011)
  - Total: 35,200

Languages
  - Official: Assamese
- Time zone: UTC+5:30 (IST)
- PIN: 787059
- Telephone code: +91, 03753
- Vehicle registration: AS-22

Silapathar is a small city and municipal board in Dhemaji district in the Indian state of Assam. The name itself derived from Assamese word "Sila" means Kite and "Pothar" means rice fields as the place used be a kiting ground for native Mising people during the winters. The city is on the northern bank of the Brahmaputra River and is 470 kilometres (290 mi) from the city of Guwahati and just six km (3.7 mi) from border of Arunachal Pradesh. The longest rail cum road bridge in India (Bogibeel bridge) connects Silapathar to Dibrugarh. Historical Malinithan Mandir is located around ten km (6.2 mi) from Silapathar.

Silapathar is the commercial hub of Dhemaji district and Arunachal Pradesh. The place has a heady mix of indigenous communities like Mising, Chutia, Ahom, Gorkhas and Deoris.

Silapathar Buddhist Monastery (Zangdok Palri Monastery) is the second largest Buddhist Monastery in India constructed by Khen Rinpoche Tsering Dorjee under the aegis of Pema Mani Charitable Trust.

== Demographics ==
As of 2011 India census, Silapathar had a population of 25662. Males constitute 52% of the population and females 48%. Silapathar has an average literacy rate of 83.25%, higher than the national average of 59.5%: male literacy is 87.72%, and female literacy is 78.39%. In Silapathar, 12% of the population is under 6 years of age.

=== Language ===
Languages spoken in Silapathar (2011)
1. Assamese (42.5%)
2. Bengali (19.9%)
3. Nepali (15.6%)
4. Mishing (12.8%)
5. Hindi (6.12%)
6. others (3.08%)

Assamese, Bengali and Mishing are the most spoken languages.

== Transportation ==
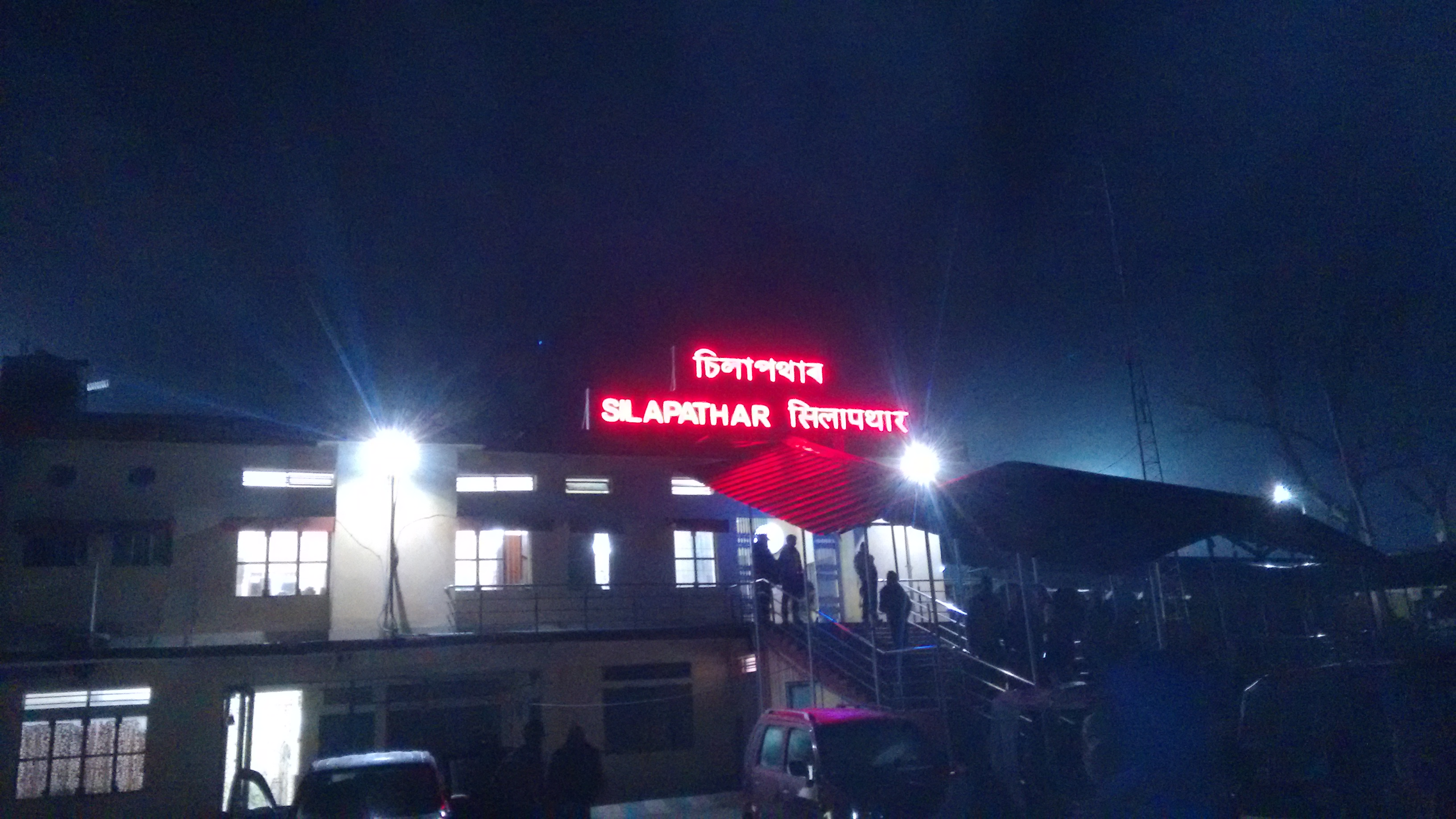
Silapathar Railway station

It is well connected to the state and the country through roadways, railways and airways. Mohanbari Airport which falls under the city of Dibrugarh is the nearest airport from Silapathar.

Currently NH-515 and NH-15 are connected to the city, also Bogibeel bridge connects the city with NH-37. ASTC provides bus services to nearby towns and cities. Private share taxi also connects major towns and daily night services also transport large number of passengers to West Bengal, Nagaland, Arunachal Pradesh and Guwahati. Silapathar Railway Station under Rangiya Railway Division give access to people of the city and nearby areas to state capital Guwahati. New Sissiborgaon and Silapathar railway station connects direct train to Dibrugarh Railway Station and from there one gets easy access to Dibrugarh Rajdhani Express.

== Education ==
=== Schools ===
- Silapathar Residential Higher Secondary School
- Silapathar Town High School
- Silapathar Town Girls High School
- Don Bosco Higher Secondary School
- Lord Macaulay High School
- Silapathar Residential English Higher Secondary School
- SFS School
- Trinity Academy
- Lord Macaulay School
- Utopian Academy
- Sun Valley Academy
- Padmav Saraswati Vidya Mandir

=== Colleges ===
- Silapathar College
- Silapathar Town College
- Silapathar Science College
- Silapathar junior science college
- Purbanchal College
- Abutani College
- Dimow Chariali College, Dimow, Silapathar

== Politics ==
Silapathar is part of Lakhimpur (Lok Sabha constituency). Mr. Pradan Barua from BJP is the present MP from this constituency in Assam.
