= Dhemaji district =

District in Assam, India

Coordinates: 27.4798°N 94.5511°E

- District of Assam
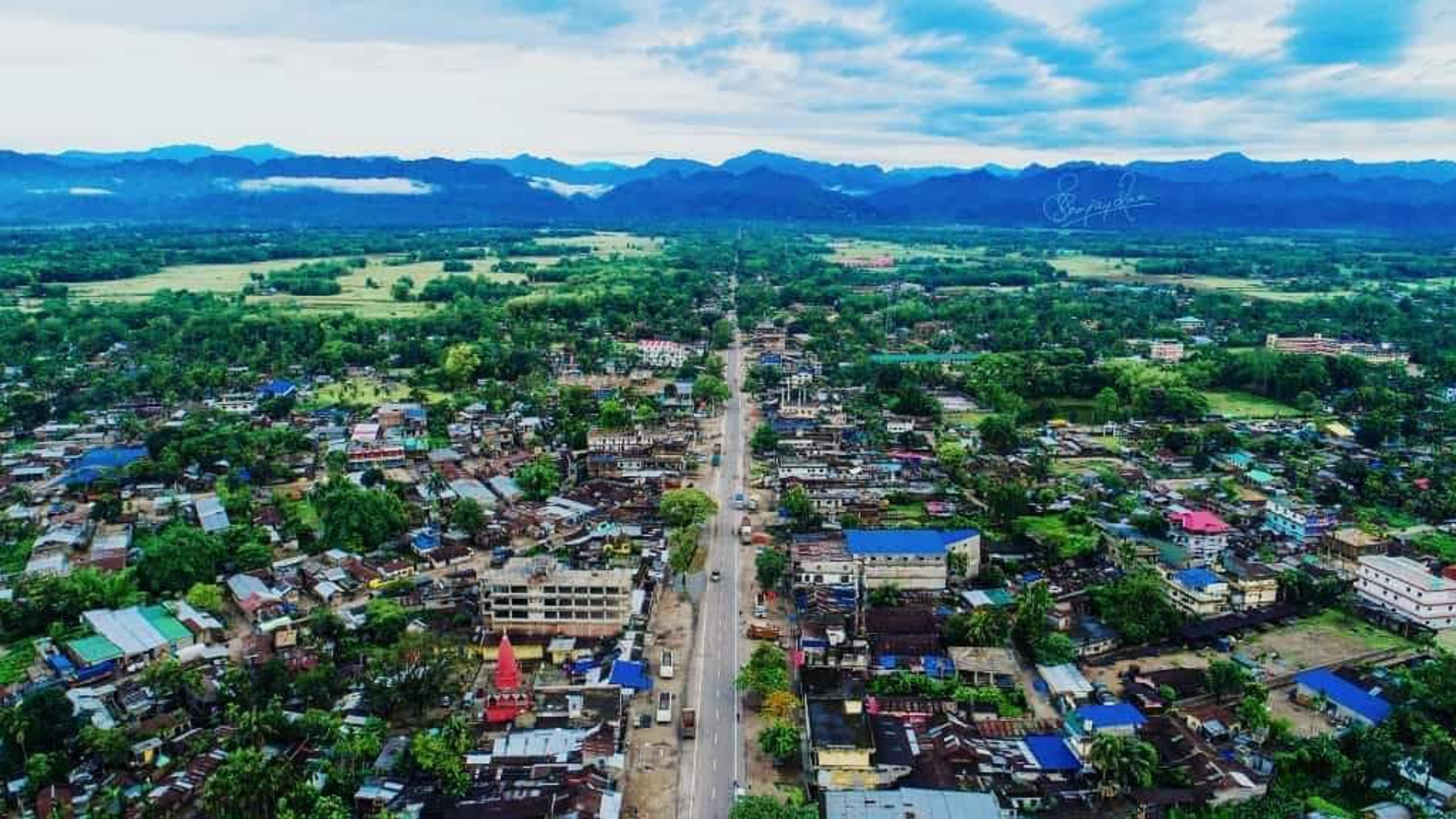
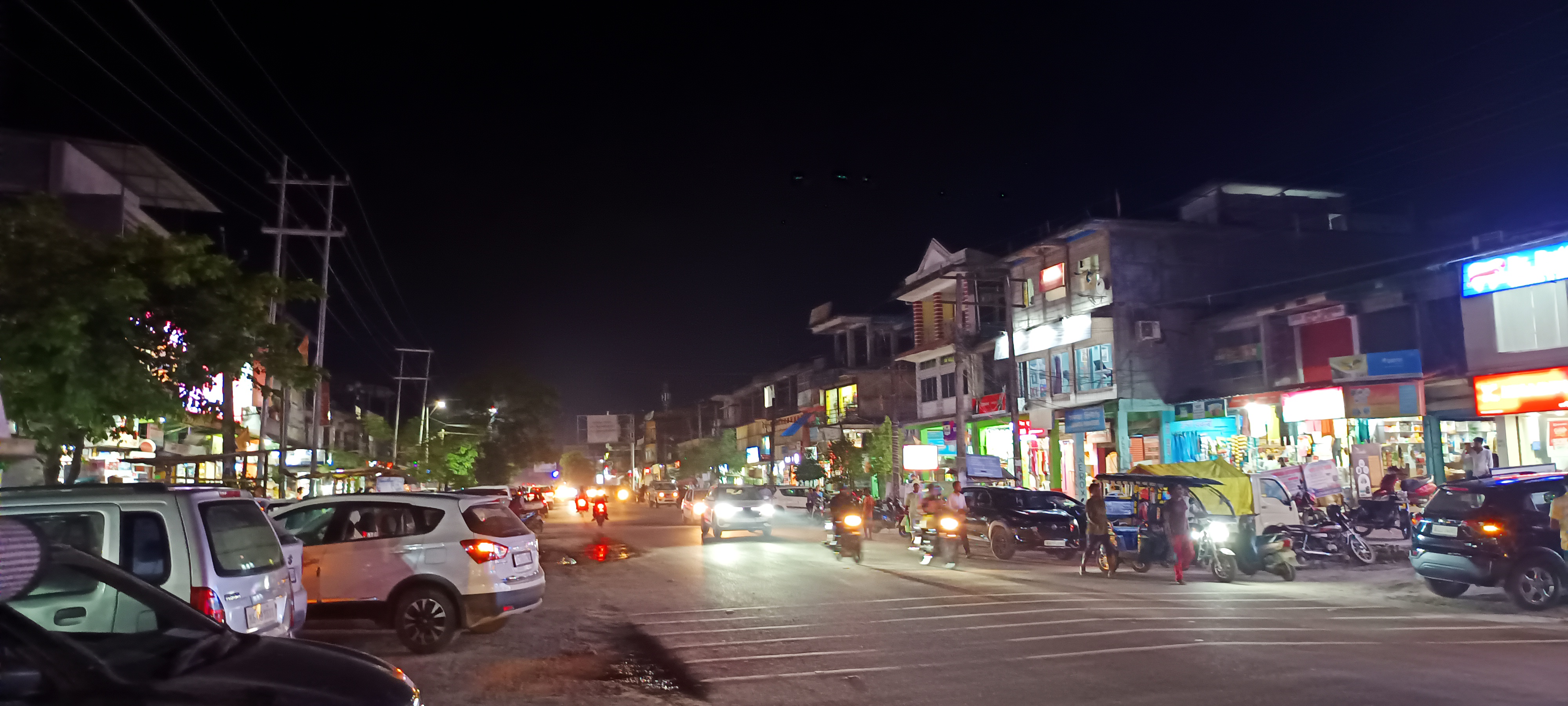
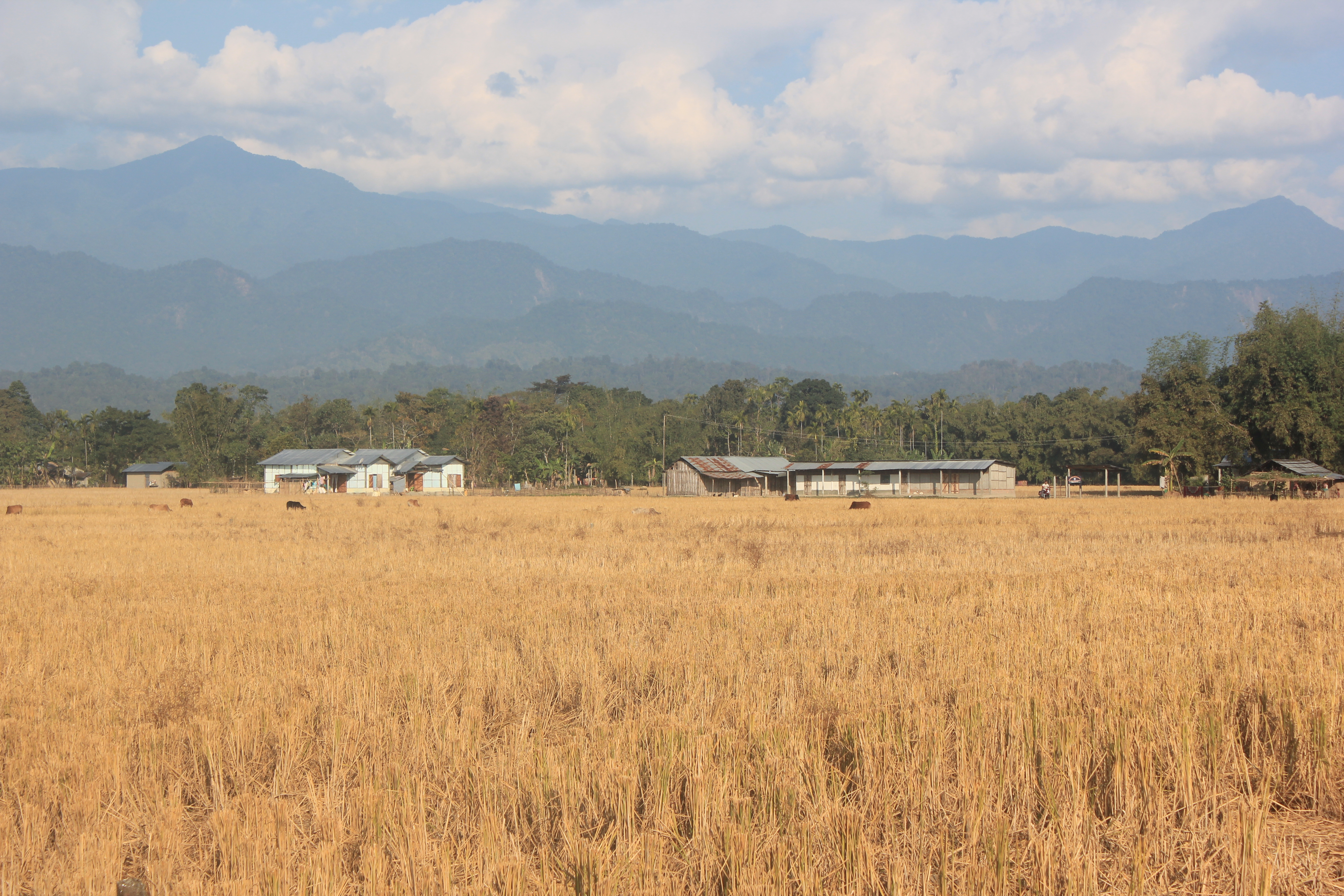
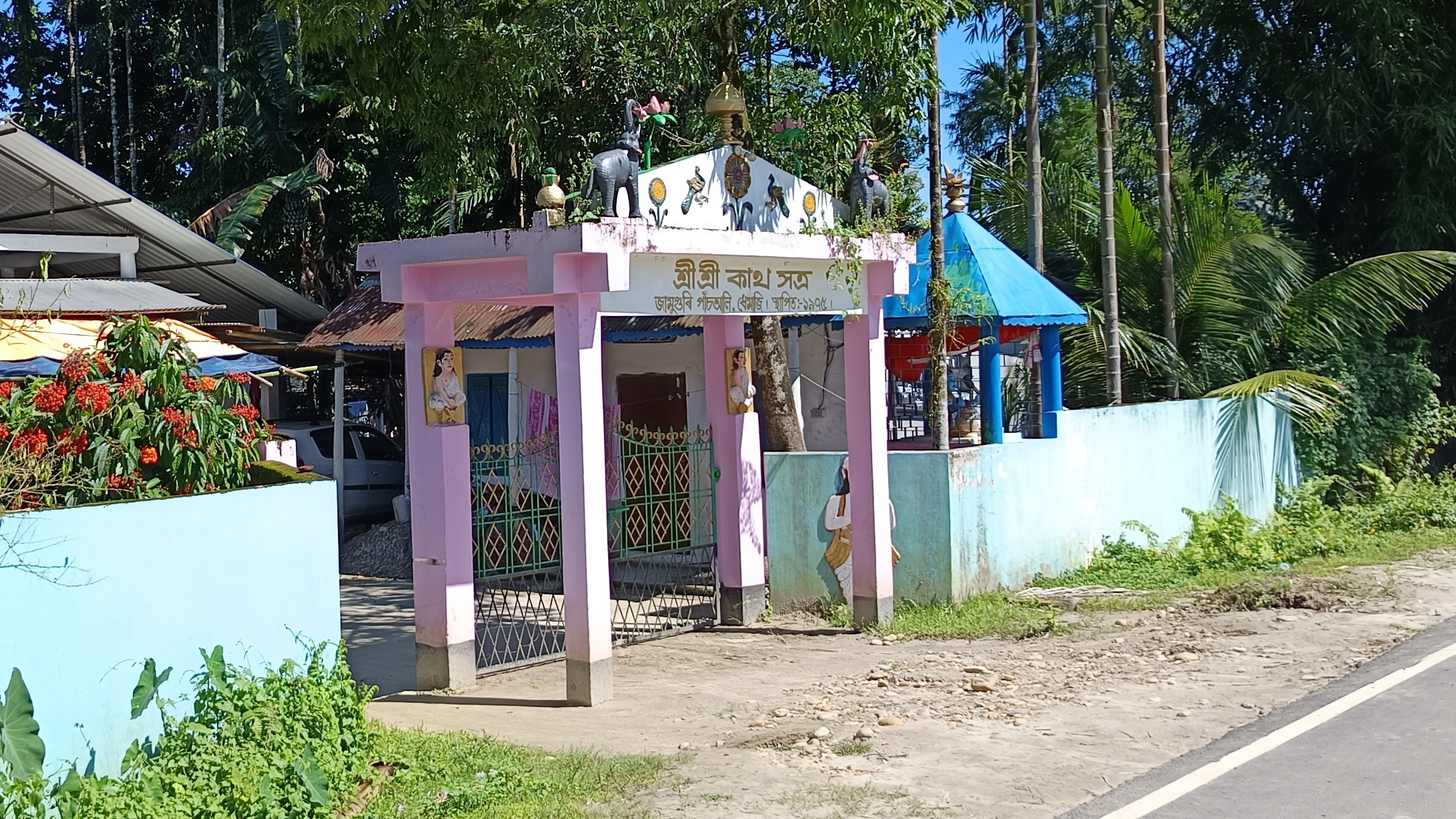
- From top, left-to-right: Dhemaji town, Dhemaji town at night, a paddy filed of Dhemaji, A Satra located in a village of Dhemaji
- Interactive map of Dhemaji district
- Country: India
- State: Assam
- Division: Upper Assam
- Headquarters: Dhemaji

Government
  - Lok Sabha constituencies: Lakhimpur
  - Vidhan Sabha constituencies: Dhemaji, Jonai

Area
  - Total: 3,237 km^{2} (1,250 sq mi)

Population (2011)
  - Total: 686,133
  - Density: 212.0/km^{2} (549.0/sq mi)
- Time zone: UTC+05:30 (IST)
- ISO 3166 code: IN-AS-DM
- Website: https://dhemaji.gov.in/

Dhemaji district (pronounced /deɪˈmɑ:ʤi/ or /di:ˈmɑ:ʤi/) is an administrative district in the state of Assam in India. The district headquarters are located in Dhemaji and commercial headquarters are located in Silapathar. Dhemaji covers an area of 3,237 km^{2} and has a population of 686,133 (as of 2011). The predominant religion is Hinduism, with Hindus comprising approximately 95.47% of the population.

== Etymology ==
The district's name Dhemaji is derived from the Deori-Chutia word Dema-ji which means great water. The name is a reference to the region being prone to flooding.

== History ==
The areas of the present district were part of the greater Chutia kingdom along with the Lakhimpur, Tinsukia, Jorhat, Dibrugarh and Sonitpur districts from the 12th century to the 16th century until the Ahom-Chutia conflict during the early period of the 16th century. The Ahoms created a new position Banlungia Gohain to control the area. Monuments built during the Chutia rule include the Malinithan, Garakhia Than, Bordoloni Than and Basudev temples.

Dhemaji became a fully-fledged district on 14 October 1989 when it was split from Lakhimpur district.

== Geography ==
The Dhemaji district occupies an area of 3,237 square kilometres (1,250 sq mi), roughly equivalent to Solomon Islands' Makira Island. It is one of the fastest developing districts of India, and located at the easternmost part of Assam.

Being in a confluence of rivers, with the Brahmaputra river flanking the district and its numerous tributaries running through the district, the region is perennially affected by floods.

The heart of Dhemaji district is Dhemaji Mouza (an area demarcated by the British regime for the purpose of tax collection, equivalent to a taluk or pargana in the pan-Indian context).

Secondly, Silapathar is the main business place of Dhemaji. The Bogibil project was running nearest to these place and is completed which connects Dibrugarh.

== Education ==
Statue of Dr. Bhupen Hazarika at Dhemaji ASTC

The notable schools in the district include Borpataria L. P. School, Bhairabpur Netaji M. E. School, St.Francis de Sales school, Dhemaji public school, Moridhal High School, Sankar Dev High school (No. 2 Manik Pur), Mother's Pride School, Silapathar Town Hanuman Gadhi Hindi High School and Dhemaji Boys' Higher Secondary School. Colleges in Dhemaji District are:

- Dhemaji College
- Dhemaji Commerce College
- Dhemaji Girls College
- Moridhal College
- Machkhowa Degree College
- Sisiborgaon College
- Pachim Dhemaji College
- Simen Chapori College
- Gogamukh College
- Bordoloni Central College
- Dimow College
- Silapathar College
- Silapathar Science College
- Silapathar Town College
- Purbanchal College
- Murkongselek College
- Jonai Girls College
- Jonai Science College
- Akajan College
- Dhemaji Engineering College
- Dhemaji Polytechnic
- Industrial Training Institute, Dhemaji
- DIET College Dhemaji
- Dhemaji PGT College (Private)

== Economy ==
In 2006, the Indian government named Dhemaji as one of the country's 250 most backward districts (out of a total of 640). It is one of the eleven districts in Assam currently receiving funds from the Backward Regions Grant Fund Programme (BRGF).

Silapathar is the most developed city in Dhemaji district. Its economy is mainly depended upon trade and commerce for development.

== Divisions ==
There are two Assam Legislative Assembly constituencies in this district: Dhemaji and Jonai. Both are designated for scheduled tribes. They make up a part of the Lakhimpur Lok Sabha constituency. Dhemaji district is politically very poor. Community politics is the main reason for this. As of 2019, Pradhan Baruah is MP (Member of Parliament), Ranuj Pegu is MLA from Dhemaji and Bhubon Pegu from Jonai.

== Demographics ==
Historical population
Year	Pop.	±% p.a.
1901	21,324	—
1911	26,930	+2.36%
1921	36,106	+2.98%
1931	44,742	+2.17%
1941	54,896	+2.07%
1951	64,745	+1.66%
1961	113,439	+5.77%
1971	230,762	+7.36%
1991	478,830	+3.72%
2001	571,944	+1.79%
2011	686,133	+1.84%

Languages of Dhemaji district (2011)
1. Assamese (39.2%)
2. Mishing (32.5%)
3. Bengali (9.80%)
4. Bodo (6.95%)
5. Nepali (5.26%)
6. Hindi (1.49%)
7. Hajong (0.95%)
8. Others (3.81%)

According to the 2011 census Dhemaji district has a population of 686,133, roughly equal to the nation of Equatorial Guinea or the US state of North Dakota. This gives it a ranking of 504th in India (out of a total of 640). The district has a population density of 213 inhabitants per square kilometre (550/sq mi). Its population growth rate over the decade 2001–2011 was 20.3%. Dhemaji has a sex ratio of 949 females for every 1000 males, and a literacy rate of 69.07%. 7.04% of the population lives in urban areas. Scheduled Castes and Scheduled Tribes made up 6.45% and 47.45% of the population respectively.

Hindus are 95.47% of the population. There are small minorities of Muslims (1.96%) and Christians (1.27%). After Majuli district, Dhemaji has the second-highest proportion of Hindus of all districts in Assam.

According to the 2011 census, 39.21% of the district's population speaks Assamese, 32.53% Mising, 9.80% Bengali, 6.95% Boro, 5.26% Nepali, 1.49% Hindi and 0.95% Hajong as their first language.

== Township areas ==
- Dhemaji
- Dimow
- Gogamukh
- Jonai Bazar
- Kulajan
- Silapathar
- Sissiborgaon
- Telam

== Flora and fauna ==
In 1996 Dhemaji district became home to the Bardoibum-Beelmukh Wildlife Sanctuary, which has an area of 11 km^{2} (4.2 mi^{2}). It shares the park with Lakhimpur district.
