= List of districts of Assam =

List containing the districts of the Indian state of Assam

Assam, a northeastern state of India, is divided into 35 administrative geographical units called districts. Assam has 35 districts.

== List of districts by divisions ==
Map of districts of Assam, by division: Lower Assam; North Assam; Upper Assam; Central Assam; Barak Valley

Lower Assam division (HQ – Guwahati)	North Assam division (HQ –Tezpur)	Upper Assam division (HQ –Jorhat)	Central Assam division (HQ –Nagaon)	Barak Valley division (HQ – Silchar)
Baksa; Bajali; Barpeta; Bongaigaon; Chirang; Dhubri; Goalpara; Kamrup; Kamrup Metropolitan; Kokrajhar; Nalbari; South Salmara-Mankachar; Tamulpur	Biswanath; Darrang; Sonitpur; Udalguri	Charaideo; Dhemaji; Dibrugarh; Golaghat; Jorhat; Lakhimpur; Majuli; Sivasagar; Tinsukia	Dima Hasao; Hojai; Morigaon; Nagaon; Karbi Anglong; West Karbi Anglong	Cachar; Hailakandi; Sribhumi

== Administrations ==
A district of an Indian state is an administrative geographical unit, headed by the District Commissioner (DC), which combines the offices of the District Magistrate ultimately responsible for maintaining law and order and District Collector responsible for collection of the revenue. Generally, an officer belonging to the Indian Administrative Service becomes the DC but occasionally officers belonging to the Assam Civil Service do get appointed. The DC is assisted by a number of officials belonging to different wings of the administrative services of the state.

The districts of Assam are grouped together in [Divisions of Assam, five regional divisions], headed by a Commissioner. A superintendent of Police, an officer belonging to Indian Police Service is entrusted with the responsibility of maintaining law and order and related issues. The police administration in Guwahati City is headed by the Commissioner of Police, which started functioning from 1 January 2015.

== History ==
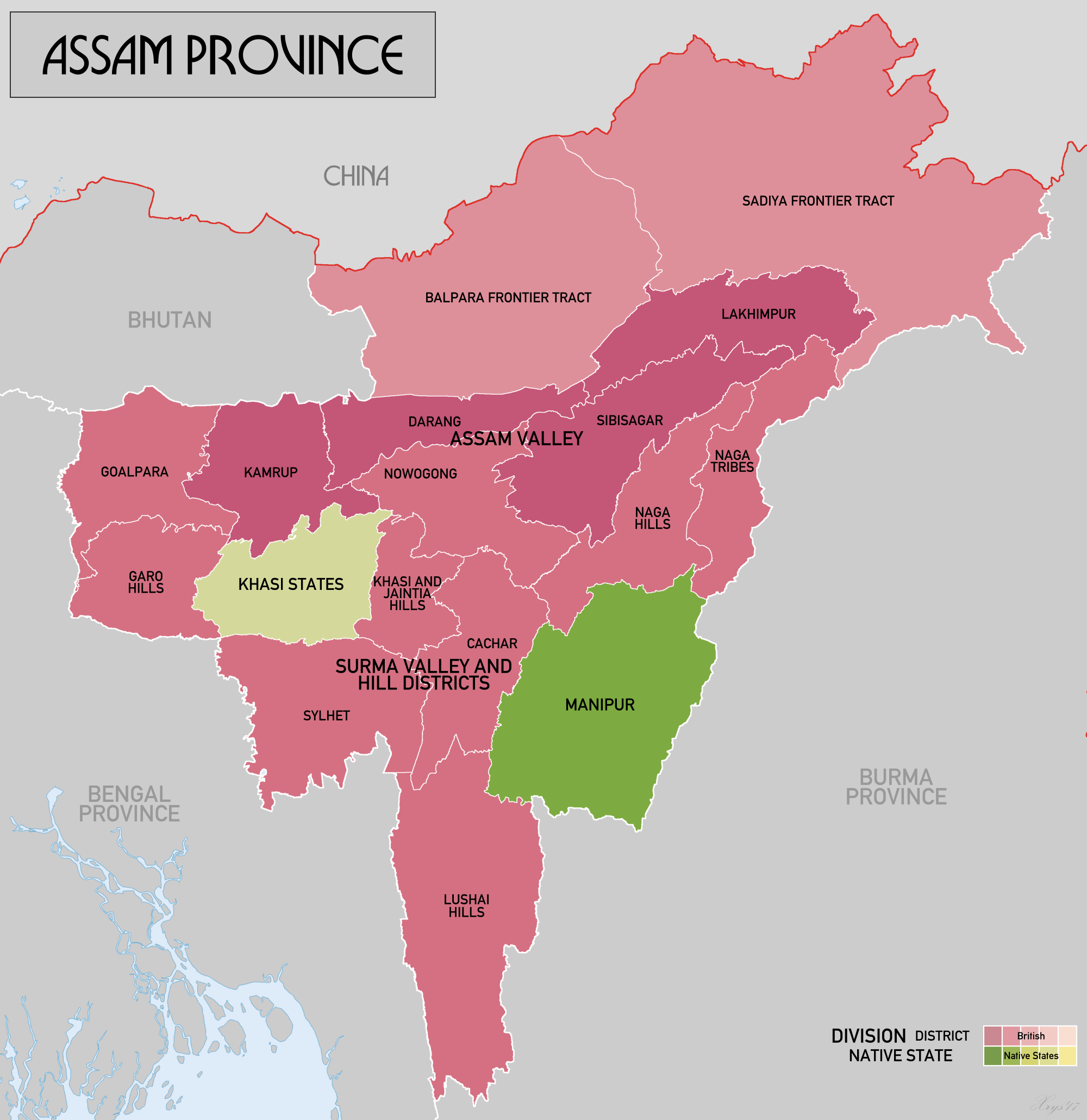
District of Assam, British India – 1936

District of undivided Assam – 1950

Before India's independence in 1947, Assam had 13 districts. The districts were Cachar (14 August 1832), Darrang (1833), Goalpara, Kamrup, Lakhimpur, Nagaon, Sivasagar, Jayantia parganas, Garo hills, Lushai hills, Naga hills, Sylhet and NEFA. The British India protectorate 4 princely states under Assam state were Tripura, Khasi states, Koch Bihar and Manipur (included during Independence). Sylhet district had been given to East Pakistan at the time of the Partition. After many inclusion and exclusion during the independence and later till 1972, Assam formed the present shape with its prime 7 districts. The other 6 districts curved out of Assam; Jayantia, Garo and Khasi were combined and became Meghalya State; Lushiai hills became Mizoram; Naga hills became Nagaland; NEFA became Arunachal Pradesh; the both princely states Tripura and Manipur included in Assam and later separated as state and Koch Bihar became part of West Bengal.

On 17 November 1951, United Mikir and North Cachar Hills district curved out of Golaghat, Nagaon, Cachar, Jayantia and Naga hills districts.

On 2 February 1970, Mikir Hills district curved out of North Cachar Hills.

On 2 October 1976, Dibrugarh district curved out of Lakhimpur and the Name of Mikir Hills district changed to Karbi Anglong district.

On 1 July 1983, Barpeta district curved out of Kamrup; On 14 July Sonitpur district curved out of Darrang; Jorhat district curved out of Sibsagar, Dhubri district and Kokrajhar district curved out of Goalpara; Karimganj district curved out of Cachar.

On 14 August 1985, Nalbari district curved out of Kamrup.

On 15 August 1987, Golaghat district curved out of Sibsagar.

On 29 September 1989, Hailakandi district curved out of Cachar and Bongaigaon district curved out of Goalpara and Kokrajhar. On 1 October Tinsukia district curved out of Dibrugarh. On 14 October Dhemaji district curved out of Lakhimpur and on 26 November Marigaon district curved out of Nagaon.

On 3 February 2003, Kamrup Metropolitan district curved out of Kamrup.

On 1 June 2004, Baksa district curved out of Barpeta, Nalbari, and Kamrup; on 4 June, Chirang district curved out of Bongaigaon and Kokrajhar. On 14 June, Udalguri district curved out of Darrang and Sonitpur; along with Kokrajhar district formed BTAD.

On 1 April 2010, the name of North Cachar Hills district changed to Dima Hasao.

On 15 August 2015, Tarun Gogoi, the Chief Minister of Assam, announced the formation of five new districts in the state, taking the total number from 27 to 32. The five new districts are the following: Biswanath (carved out of Sonitpur); Charaideo (carved out of Sivasagar); Hojai (carved out of Nagaon); South Salmara-Mankachar (carved out of Dhubri); West Karbi Anglong (carved out of Karbi Anglong).

On 26 January 2016, 2 more districts were announced, but on 7 October 2016, the government has withdrawn district status of East Kamrup and South Kamrup due to inadequate infrastructure. The two sub-divisions of East Kamrup district - viz. Chandrapur and Sonapur, is now part of Kamrup Metropolitan district. The sub-divisions of South Kamrup district is now part of Kamrup Rural district.

On 27 June 2016, one more district was announced by Sarbananda Sonowal, taking the total number from 32 to 33 which is Majuli (carved out of the Northern parts of Jorhat). It is the first river island district of India.

On 8 August 2020, the Assam cabinet approved a proposal to make Bajali (curved out of Barpeta) the 34th district of Assam. The Assam Cabinet headed by Chief Minister Himanta Biswa Sarma approved the proposal to make Tamulpur curved out of Baksa district a full-fledged district. On 23 January 2022, Tamulpur was formally declared as a 35th district of Assam.

On 31 December 2022, the Assam Cabinet decided to merge four newly carved districts with existing four districts. These districts were,

- Tamulpur with Baksa
- Bajali with Barpeta
- Hojai with Nagaon
- Biswanath with Sonitpur

Assam Chief Minister Himanta Bisha Sarma said it is a temporary measure before ECI delimitation process in the state and government may reconsider it.

On 25 August 2023, Assam Chief Minister Himanta Biswa Sarma announced the decision to recreate the four newly merged districts of Biswanath, Hojai, Bajali, and Tamulpur from their original districts. Therefore, the total number of districts in Assam has once again become 35.

== Districts ==
The areas and populations of the 35 districts are given below:

Districts	Headquarters	Formed	Population (2011)	Area (km²)	Population Density (/km²)	Map
Baksa^{#}	Mushalpur	2004	950,075	2,457	387	
Bajali	Pathsala	2021	253,816	418	610	
Barpeta	Barpeta	1983	1,693,622	3182	532	
Biswanath	Biswanath Chariali	2015	612,491	1415	430	
Bongaigaon	Bongaigaon	1989	738,804	1,093	676	
Cachar	Silchar	1947	1,736,319	3,786	459	
Charaideo	Sonari	2015	471,418	1,069	441	
Chirang^{#}	Kajalgaon	2004	482,162	1,170	412	
Darrang	Mangaldai	Before 1947	928,500	1,585	586	
Dhemaji	Dhemaji	1989	686,133	3,237	212	
Dhubri	Dhubri	Before 1947	1,394,144	1,608	867	
Dibrugarh	Dibrugarh	1971	1,326,335	3,381	392	
Dima Hasao^{##}	Haflong	1970	214,102	4,890	44	
Goalpara	Goalpara	1994	1,008,183	1,824	553	
Golaghat	Golaghat	1987	1,066,888	3,502	305	
Hailakandi	Hailakandi	1989	659,296	1,327	497	
Hojai	Sankardev Nagar	Before 1947	931,218	1,686	550	
Jorhat	Jorhat	1983	924,952	2,851	324	
Kamrup Metropolitan	Guwahati	2003	1,253,938	1,528	821	
Kamrup	Amingaon	Before 1947	1,517,542	3,105	489	
Karbi Anglong^{###}	Diphu	1970	660,955	7,366	90	
Sribhumi	Karimganj	1983	1,228,686	1,809	679	
Kokrajhar^{#}	Kokrajhar	1983	887,142	3,169	280	
Lakhimpur	North Lakhimpur	Before 1947	1,042,137	2,277	458	
Majuli	Garamur	2016	167,304	880	190	
Morigaon	Morigaon	1989	957,423	1,704	562	
Nagaon	Nagaon	Before 1947	2,823,768	3,973	711	
Nalbari	Nalbari	1985	771,639	1,052	733	
Sivasagar	Sivasagar	Before 1947	679,632	2,668	255	
Sonitpur	Tezpur	1984	1,924,110	3,176	606	
South Salmara-Mankachar	Hatsingimari	2016	555,114	568	977	
Tamulpur	Tamulpur	2022	389,150	884	440	
Tinsukia	Tinsukia	1989	1,327,929	3,790	350	
Udalguri^{#}	Udalguri	2004	831,688	1,852	449	
West Karbi Anglong^{###}	Hamren	2016	295,358	3,035	97	

^{#} Districts within the BTAD

^{##} Districts under NC Hill autonomy

^{###} Districts under KA autonomy

== Demand for new districts ==
Implementation of the "Co-District" model

Rather than notifying new standalone districts, the Government of Assam has opted for a decentralization strategy through the creation of "co-districts" (Assamese: Xama-Zilla). This model aims to provide district-level services within existing legislative assembly constituencies (LACs) without the full overhead of a new district.

Key milestones achieved in this model include

- Phase I: In late 2024, 39 co-districts were established.
- Phase II: In August 2025, 10 additional co-districts were notified including Digboi, Makum, Mariani, Teok, and Boko-Chhaygaon, bringing the total number of existing co-districts to 49.

Future Plans

The state has announced a long-term goal of expanding the existing list of 49 co-districts to 78 across Assam to ensure "minimum government, maximum governance".

== See also ==
- List of districts in India
- List of big cities in North East India
- List of co-districts of Assam
- List of subdivisions of Assam
