= Komorakata =

- Village
- Komorakata
- Interactive map of Komorakata
- Coordinates: 26.0°N 92.87°E
- Country: India
- State: Assam
- Region: Hojai district

Government
  - Body: Gram panchayat

Population (2011)
  - Total: 3,357

Languages
  - Official: Dimasa
- PIN: 782435

Komorakata (alternative spelling includes Kumurakata) is a village situated in Hojai district (formerly in Nagaon district) state of Assam, India. According to the 2011 Census of India, it has a population of 3,357. Komorakata village, most of the village population is from Schedule Tribe (ST). It is 6 km away from West Karbi Anglong district. Its PIN code is 782435.

== Education ==
=== School ===
- Komorakata Hing School
- Komorakata Tribal LP School
- Pandit Jivan Ram Barman MV School

=== College ===
- Komorakata Higher Secondary

== See also ==
- Hojai district
- Doboka
