= Davaka kingdom =

Davaka Kingdom
- ??–6th century CE
- Location on the Davaka kingdom and contemporary South Asian polities circa 350 CE.
- Capital: Unknown and Lanka
- Historical era: Classical Period
  - Established: ??
  - Disestablished: 6th century CE
- Today part of: India

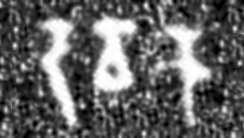
"Davaka" (Brahmi script:) in the Allahabad Pillar inscription

Davaka (Skt. *Ḍavāka) was a kingdom of ancient Indian subcontinent, located in current central region of Assam state. The references to it comes from the 4th century Allahabad pillar inscription of Samudragupta, where it is mentioned as one of five frontier kingdoms of the Gupta Empire. Other references are the Shung-Shu History of the Liu Song dynasty, where the kingdom is named Kapili (now the name of a river); the Gachtal stone pillar inscription written in Kamrupi Prakrit. N. K. Bhattasali has identified it with Dabaka in modern Hojai district, with the kingdom associated with the Kopili-Kolong river valley.

Historians such as B. N. Puri (1968) and P. C. Choudhury (1959) claim that it was absorbed much earlier in the first half of the 5th century during the reign of Kalyana Varman (422–446).

Its capital was located near Kopili river. In the year 428 AD, an ambassador was sent to China by Davaka king, whose name according to Chinese sources is Candrakānta/Kāntacandra where it is known as (Chinese: 月愛; pinyin: Yuè ài). (Note: This is a calque of Candrakānta/Kāntacandrawhere the meaning of the two syllables are translated into characters rather than phonetics.)

Gatchal Stone Pillar inscription mention that the Yavana(Muslim) crossed the boundary to move east to reach Davaka in 1362 (saka 1284). A river (identified as Yamuna) that floods during April-May helped naval forces to drive away enemies.

== See also ==
- Dabaka
- Nagaon
- Dimasa Kingdom

== Bibliography ==
- Boruah, Nirode (2001). "The kingdom of the Kapili Valley of Assam". Proceedings of the Indian History Congress. 62: 135–143. ISSN 2249-1937. JSTOR 44155755.
- Choudhury, P. C. (1959). The History of Civilization of the People of Assam to the Twelfth Century AD. Department of History and Antiquarian Studies, Gauhati, Assam.
- Dutta, Anima (2008). Political geography of Pragjyotisa Kamarupa (Ph.D.). Gauhati University. hdl:10603/68309.
- Lahiri, Nayanjot (1991). Pre-Ahom Assam: Studies in the Inscriptions of Assam between the Fifth and the Thirteenth Centuries AD. Delhi: Munshiram Manoharlal Publishers Pvt Ltd.
- Puri, Brij Nath (1968). Studies in Early History and Administration in Assam. Gauhati University.
- Mookerji, Radhakumud (1973). The Gupta Empire. Motilal Banarasidass.
- Sharma, M M (1990), "Language and Literature", in Barpujari, H K (ed.), The Comprehensive History of Assam, vol. I, Guwahati: Publication Board, Assam, pp. 263–264
