= Nakhuti =

Village in India

Nakhuti is a village in the Hojai district of Assam, India. Its revenue division is Lanka.
