= Bhattadev University =

University in Assam, India

- Motto in English: Knowledge is one that liberates
- Type: Public
- Established: 2019 (7 years ago)
- Affiliations: UGC
- Chancellor: Governor of Assam
- Vice-Chancellor: Dr. Dhanapati Deka
- Location: Pathsala, Bajali district, Assam; 26°30′12″N 91°11′6″E
- Campus: Suburban
- Website: www.bhattadevuniversity.ac.in

Bhattadev University is a public state university located at Pathsala, Bajali district, Assam. The university is established by Bhattadev University Act, 2017 which was passed by the Governor of Assam on 7 September 2017.

It was created by upgrading Bajali College of Pathsala, Bajali district. It was named after Sri Sri Bhattadev, also known as Vaikunthanath Bhagwat Bhattacharyya, an important preceptor of the Ekasarana Naam Dharma and the father of Assamese prose because he composed Shrimadbhagawatam and Shrimadbhagawatgita in classical Assamese prose in the 17th century AD. The UGC has recognized Bhattadev University as an institution “empowered to award degrees as specified by the UGC under section 22 of the UGC Act 1956 by conducting courses through its own departments, its constituent colleges and/or through its affiliated colleges in regular mode with the approval of concerned statutory bodies/councils” vide its letter F.No. 9-12/2019 (CPP-I/PU) dated 25 September 2019.

On 25 June 2019 Prof. Birinchi Kumar Das, PhD(IISc) took charge as the first Vice-Chancellor of Bhattadev University.

== Affiliated colleges ==
The university has jurisdiction over colleges in Bajali district, Barpeta district. As per 2024, the affiliated colleges are:

1. Baosi Banikanta Kakati (BBK) College,Nagaon,Barpeta.
2. Bapuji College,Sarthebari,Barpeta.
3. Barnagar College,Sarbhog,Barpeta.
4. Barpeta Girls’ College, Barpeta.
5. Barpeta Road Howly (B.H.) College,Howly,Barpeta.
6. Bhawanipur Anchalik College, Bhawanipur, Barpeta.
7. Bhawanipur Hastinapur Bijni (B.H.B.)
8. G.L. Choudhury College,Barpeta Road,Barpeta.
9. Govt. Model Women College,Chenga,Barpeta.
10. Govt. Model Degree College,Baghbar,Barpeta.
11. Madhab Choudhury (M.C) College,Barpeta.
12. Madhya Kamrup College, Shubha,Barpeta.
13. Mandia Anchalik College, Mandia,Barpeta.
14. Nabajyoti College, Kalgachia,Barpeta.
15. Nirmal Haloi College, Patacharkuchi, Barpeta.
16. North Kamrup College, Baghmara, Barpeta.
17. Sankar Madhab College, Barpeta.
18. Uttar Barpeta College, Barpeta.

It is part of the Association of Indian Universities.
