= Choto Haibor =

Choto Haibor Panigaon Kachalokhuwa Adarsha Nagar
- city
- Location in Assam, India Choto Haibor (India)
- Coordinates: 26°21′17″N 92°41′46″E
- Country: India
- State: Assam
- District: Nagaon
- Founder: Sabbir Hazarika
- Named for: 9 village is connected to Nagaon city

Government
  - Type: Bjp

Population (2017)
  - Total: 18,546

Languages
  - Official: Assamese
- Time zone: UTC+5:30 (IST)
- Postal code: 782001
- Vehicle registration: AS 02

Choto Haibor is a census town in Nagaon district in the state of Assam, India.

== Demographics ==
At the 2001 India census, Choto Haibor had a population of 5,247. Males constitute 52% of the population, and females constitute 48%. Choto Haibor has an average literacy rate of 67%, higher than the national average of 59.5%, with male literacy of 72% and female literacy of 62%. 13% of the population is under 6 years of age.
