= Bhawanipur Hastinapur Bijni College =

College in Assam

- Type: Undergraduate college
- Established: 1971
- Affiliation: Gauhati University
- Principal: Dr. Nayan Jyoti Das
- Address: Sarupeta, Barpeta district, Assam, India
- Website: bhbcollege.ac.in

Bhawanipur Hastinapur Bijni College is an undergraduate college established in the year 1971 at Sarupeta of Barpeta district in Assam. The college is affiliated to Gauhati University.

== Departments ==
- Assamese
- English
- Economics
- Sanskrit
- History
- Mathematics
- Philosophy
- Political science
- Education
- Arabic
- Statistics
- Bodo
- Commerce
- Computer application

== Accreditation ==
In February 2024 the college has completed NAAC 3rd cycle inspection and awarded "B++" grade with CGPA 2.93 by National Assessment and Accreditation Council. The college is also recognised by University Grants Commission (India).
