= Lataimari =

- village
- Country: India
- State: Assam

Languages
  - Official: Assamese
- Time zone: UTC+5:30 (IST)
- Vehicle registration: AS
- Nearest city: Nagaon

Lataimari is a small village in the Nagaon district in the Indian state of Assam. It is situated around 123 kilometres (76 mi) east of Guwahati.
