= Jogipara =

Villages in Kamrup Metropolitan district

- Village
- Map of Assam Jogipara (India)
- Coordinates: 26.04854°N 91.12333°E
- Country: India
- State: Assam
- District: Kamrup Metro
- Region: Azara

Area
  - Total: 259.86 ha (642.1 acres)
- Elevation: 54 m (177 ft)

Population (2011)
  - Total: 4,482
  - Density: 1,725/km^{2} (4,467/sq mi)

Languages
  - Official: Assamese
- Time zone: UTC+5:30 (IST)
- Postal code: 781017
- STD Code: 0361
- Vehicle registration: AS-01
- Census code: 303413

Jogipara is a census village in Azara Circle of Kamrup Metropolitan district, Assam, India. As per 2011 Census of India, the village has population of total 4,482 people, out of which 2,249 are males and 2,233 are females, with a literacy rate of 87.30%.
