= Tumpung =

- town
- Location in Assam, India Tumpung (India)
- Coordinates: 26°12′0″N 93°9′0″E
- Country: India
- State: Assam
- District: Karbi Anglong
- Elevation: 71 m (233 ft)

Languages
  - Official: English, Assamese
  - Regional: Karbi
- Time zone: UTC+5:30 (IST)
- Vehicle registration: AS 09
- Coastline: 0 kilometres (0 mi)

Tumpung is a town in Karbi Anglong district, Assam, India.

== Geography ==
It is located at an elevation of 71 m above mean sea level.

== Location ==
Nearest railway station is at Lanka and the nearest airport is Dimapur Airport. It is connected by National Highway 36 to Dimapur, which is 66 km away.
