= Lumding Railway Colony =

- city
- Location in Assam, India Lumding Railway Colony (India)
- Coordinates: 25°45′00″N 93°10′36″E
- Country: India
- State: Assam
- District: Hojai

Population (2011)
  - Total: 22,658

Languages
  - Official Language: Assamese
- Time zone: UTC+5:30 (IST)
- Vehicle registration: AS

Lumding Railway Colony is a census town in Hojai district in the Indian state of Assam.

== Demographics ==
Languages spoken in Lumding railway Colony (2011)
1. Bengali (67.7%)
2. Hindi (13.3%)
3. Assamese (8.68%)
4. Others (10.3%)

Lumding railway colony have a population of 22,658 as per 2011 census. Bengali is spoken by 15,332 people, Hindi at 3,022, Assamese is Spoken by 1,966 people, and 2,336 people speaks other languages.

As of 2001 India census, Lumding Railway Colony had a population of 25,283. Males constitute 52% of the population and females 48%. Lumding Railway Colony has an average literacy rate of 82%, higher than the national average of 59.5%: male literacy is 86%, and female literacy is 78%. In Lumding Railway Colony, 9% of the population is under 6 years of age.

=== Religion ===
Religion in Lumding railway colony (2011)
1. Hinduism (95.8%)
2. Islam (2.06%)
3. Christianity (1.65%)
4. Buddhism (0.29%)
5. Sikhism (0.08%)
