= Suresh Ranjan Goduka =

Indian Mass Communicator and Poet

- Born: 7 September 1973 (age 53); Safrai Borpothar Gaon, Charaideo district, Assam, India
- Education: Gauhati University; Indian Institute of Technology Guwahati
- Occupations: Mass communicator; poet; writer; social activist
- Known for: Editor of Jeevan magazine; Founder of Jeevan kite and river festival

Suresh Ranjan Goduka (born September 7, 1973) is an Indian poet and social activist from Assam. He is the editor of Assamese monthly magazine Jeevan, which sells 5000 copies a month and founder of Jeevan kite and river festival. India Today listed Goduka among India's 35 young achievers who have shown determination, innovation and courage towards the uplift of the society.

== Early life and education ==
Goduka's forefathers migrated to Assam from the erstwhile Rajputana a century ago. Goduka was born at Safrai Borpothar Gaon of Charaideo district in Assam on 7 September 1973. He is pursuing a PhD in communication design from Indian Institute of Technology Guwahati.

== Notable works ==
=== Literature ===
Goduka gave up a documentary filmmaking career in New Delhi and he started writing poetry and other literary works. He went back Assam in 2004 to start Jeevan (Jeevan means Life in Assamese), a monthly Assamese magazine, which seeks to explore the diversity, beauty and infinite possibility of life. He is the author of poetry book Nijor Anuposthitit Moi (2014). Goduka is one of the most popular Assamese poets of his time. In an interview, Sahitya Akademi Award and Jnanpith Award-winning writer Mamoni Raisom Goswami said on his poetry that:

He is one of the finest poets in Assam, but I admire him more for his efforts to show the youth a path of self-sufficiency. Jeevan stands out as it spreads a positive message in an environment of despair.

=== Mass communication and social works ===
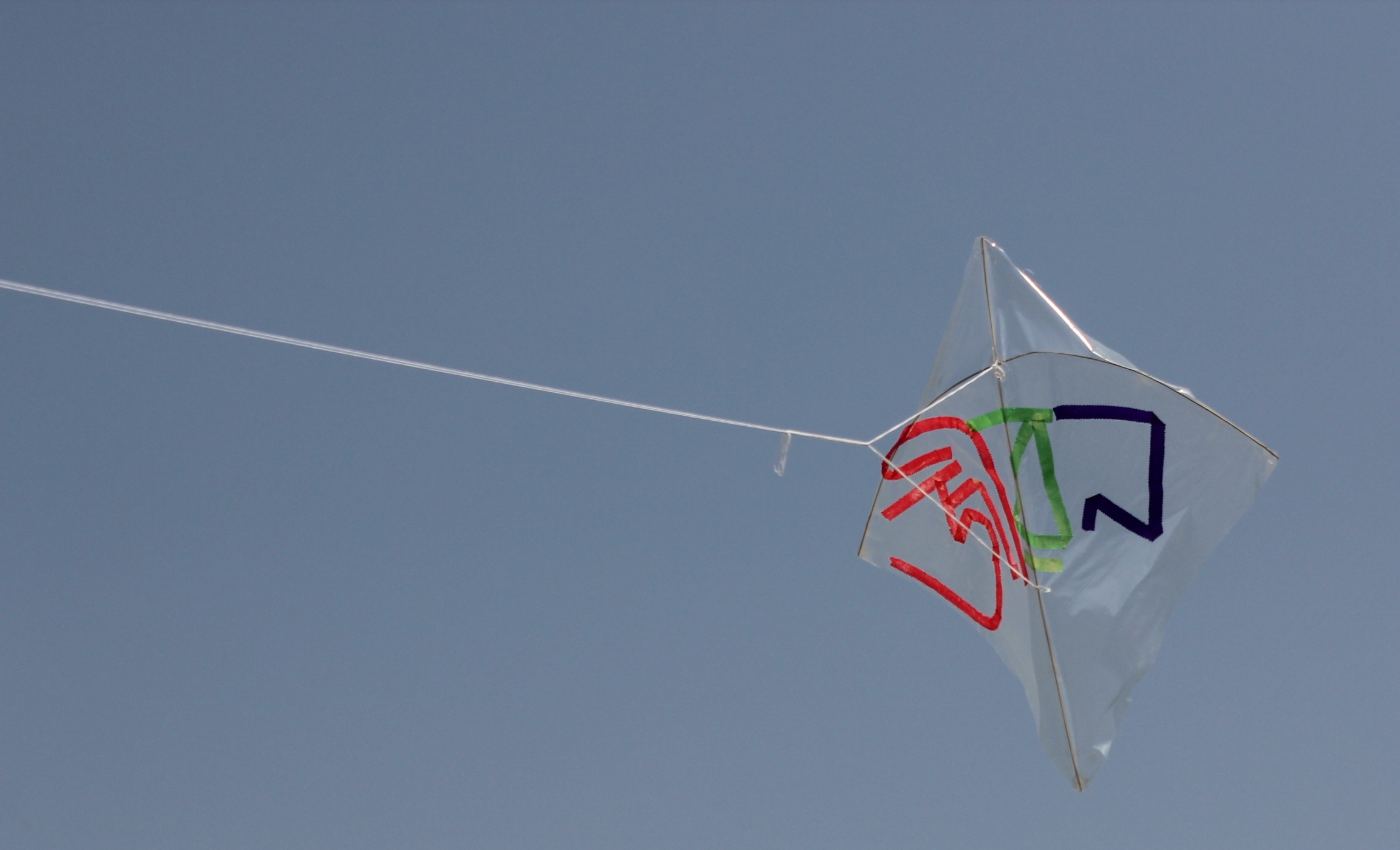
A Kite was flying high at Jeevan kite festival that had Jeevan (Assamese:জীৱন) written on it

Goduka is the founder of Jeevan Kite River Festival, a river beach event on the bank of the Brahmaputra River that involves the aim of clean river bank, including several other activities like kite flying, adventure sports, and many other cultural events.
