= Silagrant =

Villages in Kamrup Metropolitan district

Silagrant Sila Grant
- Village
- Map of Assam Silagrant (India)
- Coordinates: 26.1770°N 91.68925°E
- Country: India
- State: Assam
- District: Kamrup Metro
- Region: Amingaon

Area
  - Total: 243 ha (600 acres)
- Elevation: 54 m (177 ft)

Population (2011)
  - Total: 6,504
  - Density: 2,680/km^{2} (6,930/sq mi)

Languages
  - Official: Assamese
- Time zone: UTC+5:30 (IST)
- Postal code: 781031
- STD Code: 0361
- Vehicle registration: AS-25
- Census code: 303427

Silagrant also known as Sila Grant is a census village in North-Guwahati of Kamrup Metropolitan district, Assam, India.

As per 2011 Census of India, the village has population of total 6,504 people, out of which 3,271 are males and 3,233 are females.
