= Chandrapur Bagicha =

- city
- Location in Assam, India Chandrapur Bagicha (India)
- Coordinates: 26°13′45″N 91°55′10″E
- Country: India
- State: Assam
- District: Kamrup Metropolitan district

Population (2001)
  - Total: 5,230

Languages
  - Official: Assamese
- Time zone: UTC+5:30 (IST)
- Vehicle registration: AS

Chandrapur Bagicha is a census town in Kamrup Metropolitan district,Guwahati in the state of Assam, India.

== Demographics ==
As of 2001 India census, Chandrapur Bagicha had a population of 5230. Males constitute 55% of the population and females 45%. Chandrapur Bagicha has an average literacy rate of 73%, higher than the national average of 59.5%; with male literacy of 78% and female literacy of 66%. 11% of the population is under 6 years of age.
