= Hojai riots =

1993 Incident in India

1993 Hojai riots
- Location: Hojai, Hojai district, Assam, India
- Date: July 1993 (UTC+5:30)
- Target: Hindus, Muslims
- Attack type: Riot
- Deaths: 90+

Hojai riots refers to the riots that took place between Hindus and Muslims in Hojai, Assam in 1993, in the wake of the demolition of the Babri Masjid. 90 Hindus and Muslims were killed in the riots by some supporters of the Idgah Protection Force. The incident started with a tiff between a photo shop owner and a customer. (Note: In Hojai, a communal riot began over a tiff between a customer and the owner of a photo studio shop.) Prior to the deadly incidents in July 1993, rioting in Hojai district had already kicked off as early as December 1992, with police and militant groups such as ULFA reportedly forcibly putting down some of the unrest.

The riots were investigated by the Justice D Pathak Commission instituted soon after the riots. It had submitted its report in 1995, but the report itself was not published until 2000. More than 90 people were killed in the riots, of which 10 succumbed to police and army firings; and about 23 temples and mosques were damaged.
