= Administrative divisions of Assam =

Regional divisions in Assam

Administrative division of Assam: Lower Assam; North Assam; Upper Assam; Central Assam; Barak Valley

The state of Assam in India has five regional divisions, each comprising a number of districts. The Divisional Commissioner is the head of administration of a division.

== History ==
Location of the oldest urban centres recognised as a municipality region of Assam before 1947.

In 1874, Assam was constituted as a Chief Commissioner's province with the seat of the government in Shillong, the erstwhile capital of Assam, which is now in Meghalaya. To better administer the six districts of Goalpara, Kamrup, Sonitpur, Nagaon (formerly, Nowgong), Sivasagar (formerly, Sibsagar) and Lakhimpur, (the districts in the Brahmaputra valley, also called Assam Valley), the Judge of Assam Valley was given the additional charge of a commissioner in 1880. In 1905, the offices of the Judge and the Commissioner were segregated in the Assam Valley; in addition to adding a separate Commissioner's office for the administration of the Hill Districts and Surma Valley.

== List of divisions ==
=== Current divisions ===
Division Name	Divisional Office	Districts	Population	Area
Barak Valley	Silchar	Cachar, Hailakandi, and Karimganj	3,612,581	
Central Assam and Hills	Nagaon	Dima Hasao, Hojai, Karbi Anglong, West Karbi Anglong, Morigaon, and Nagaon	5,894,460	
Lower Assam	Guwahati	Baksa, Barpeta, Bajali, Bongaigaon, Chirang, Dhubri, Goalpara, Nalbari, Kamrup Metropolitan, Kamrup Rural, Kokrajhar, and South Salmara-Mankachar, Tamulpur	13,179,980	
North Assam	Tezpur	Biswanath, Darrang, Sonitpur, and Udalguri	4,246,834	
Upper Assam	Jorhat	Charaideo, Dhemaji, Dibrugarh, Golaghat, Jorhat, Lakhimpur, Majuli, Sivasagar, and Tinsukia	7,840,943	

=== Proposed divisions (new) ===
Division Name	Divisional Office	Districts
Assam Hills	Diphu	Dima Hasao, Karbi Anglong, and West Karbi Anglong
Barak Valley	Silchar	Cachar, Hailakandi, and Karimganj
Bodoland	Kokrajhar	Baksa, Chirang, Kokrajhar, and Udalguri
Central Assam	Nagaon	Hojai, Morigaon, and Nagaon
Kamrup	Guwahati	Darrang, East Kamrup, Kamrup Metropolitan, Kamrup Rural, and South Kamrup
Lower Assam	Bongaigaon	Barpeta, Bajali, Bongaigaon, Dhubri, Goalpara, Nalbari, and South Salmara-Mankachar
North Assam	Tezpur	Biswanath, Lakhimpur, and Sonitpur
Upper Assam	Jorhat	Charaideo, Dhemaji, Dibrugarh, Golaghat, Jorhat, Majuli, Sivasagar, and Tinsukia

== Municipal corporations ==
=== Municipal corporation (present) ===
- Guwahati
- Dibrugarh
- Silchar

== Oldest recognised and constantly inhabited urban areas ==
The list of the oldest urban areas based on the earliest years of formation of the civic bodies, constituted before India's Independence of 1947.

Type	Formation period	Urban areas
Municipal board region	Prior to India's independence in 1947	1. Guwahati; 2. Silchar; 3. Dibrugarh; 4. Goalpara; 5. Dhubri; 6. Nagaon; 7. Tezpur; 8. Jorhat; 9. Golaghat
