= Bajali district =

District of Assam in India

- District
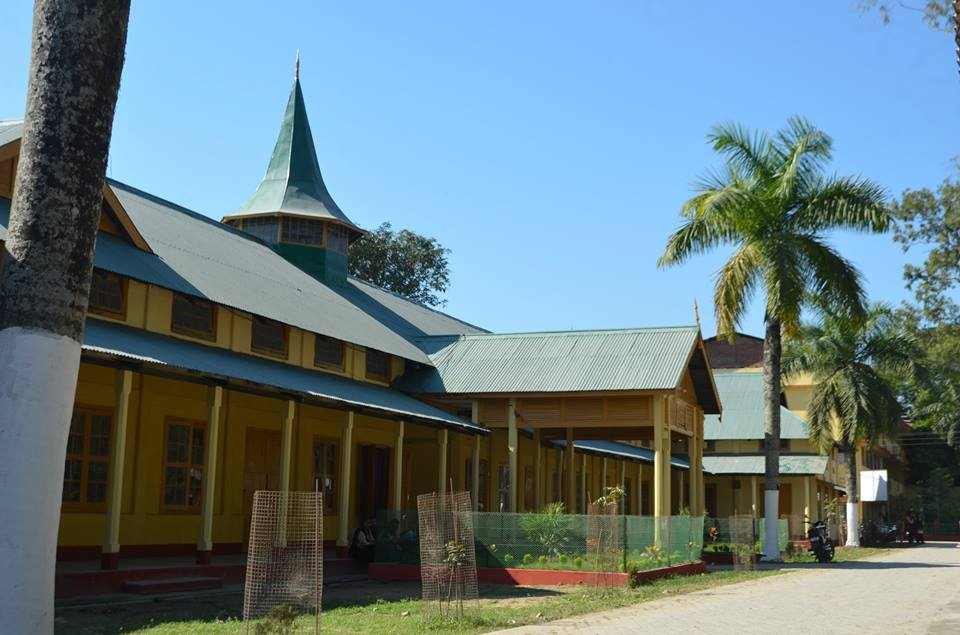
- Bajali college

- Location in Assam
- Country: India
- State: Assam
- Division: Lower Assam
- Established: 12 January 2021
- Headquarters: Pathsala

Government
  - Lok Sabha constituencies: Kokrajhar, Barpeta

Area
  - Total: 418 km^{2} (161 sq mi)

Population (2011)
  - Total: 253,816
  - Density: 607/km^{2} (1,570/sq mi)
- Website: https://bajali.assam.gov.in/

Bajali district is a district of the Indian state of Assam, carved out of Barpeta district. The Assam Cabinet headed by former Chief Minister Sarbananda Sonowal approved the proposal to make Bajali a full-fledged district on 10 August 2020. On 12 January 2021 Bajali was formally declared as a district. On 31 December 2022, the district was remerged with existing Barpeta district.

However, on August 25, 2023, the Assam cabinet made an announcement regarding the restoration of the district status of Bajali and on October 12, Bajali again became a district.

Bajali comprised parts of Bajali, Jalah and Sarupeta circles. Dolor Pathar is the most popular village under bajali district And Pathsala is main town of the district.

== Demographics ==
Religions in Bajali district (2011)
Religion	Percent
Hinduism	67.90%
Islam	31.91%
Other or not stated	0.19%

According to the 2011 census, erstwhile Bajali district has a population of 253,876, of which 11,242 (4.43%) live in urban areas. Bajali has a sex ratio of 978 females per 1000 males. Scheduled Castes notably the Kaibarta-Jalkeot community and Scheduled Tribes notably the Boro community make up 19,192 (7.56%) and 11,486 (4.52%) of the population respectively.

Population of circles by religion
Circle	Hindus (%)	Muslims (%)	Others (%)
Bajali (Pt)	94.51	5.34	0.15
Sarupeta (Pt)	43.89	55.92	0.19
Jalah (Pt)	86.32	13.54	0.14

The district religious composition are as follows: Hindu 172,388, Muslim 81,003 and others at 485 as per 2011 census report.

Languages of Bajali district (2011)
1. Assamese (74.5%)
2. Bengali (20.9%)
3. Boro (4.28%)
4. others (0.34%)

189,075 of the population spoke Assamese, 53,052 Bengali, 10,877 Boro and 0.36% speaks other minority languages.
