= North Assam division =

- Division of Assam
- The five divisions of Assam
- Country: India
- State: Assam
- Capital: Tezpur
- Largest City: Tezpur

Area
  - Total: 6,613 km^{2} (2,553 sq mi)

Population (2011 census)
  - Total: 3,684,298
  - Density: 557.1/km^{2} (1,443/sq mi)

North Assam division is an administrative division of Assam under the jurisdiction of a Commissioner, who is officially stationed at Tezpur. It consists of the following districts: Udalguri, Darrang, Sonitpur and Biswanath. Shri Rakesh Kumar, IAS is the current Commissioner of this division.

== Districts ==
North Assam district comprises mainly 4 districts, namely Udalguri, Darrang, Sonitpur and Biswanath.

Code	District	Headquarter	Population (2011)	Area (km^{2})	Density (/km^{2})
BS	Biswanath	Biswanath Chariali	612 491	1,100	557
DR	Darrang	Mangaldai	928 500	1,585	586
ST	Sonitpur	Tezpur	1 311 619	2,076	632
UD	Udalguri^{#}	Udalguri	831 688	1,852	449
Total	4	—	3 684 298	6,613	557

^{#} Districts within the Bodoland Territorial Region

== Demographics ==
As per 2011 census, North Assam division has a population of 3,684,298

=== Languages ===
Languages spoken in North Assam Division (2011)
1. Assamese (36.4%)
2. Bengali (25.1%)
3. Boro (10.6%)
4. Sadri (8.54%)
5. Nepali (4.98%)
6. Hindi (3.42%)
7. Others (11.1%)

According to 2011 census, the total number of Assamese speakers in the division were 1,339,782, Bengali speakers were 923,791, Boro speakers were 389,390, Sadri speakers were 314,665, Nepali speakers were 183,601 and Hindi speakers were 125,908.

=== Religion ===
Religion in North Assam Division (2011)
1. Hinduism (64.1%)
2. Islam (28.6%)
3. Others (7.28%)

District	Hindu	Muslim	Other
Sonitpur	69.27	22.75	7.98
Darrang	35.25	64.34	0.41
Udalguri	73.64	12.66	13.70
Biswanath	83.96	8.52	7.52

== See also ==
- Upper Assam Division
- Lower Assam Division
- Barak Valley Division
- Central Assam Division
