= Sankardev Nagar =

Sankardev Nagar Srimanta Sankardev Nagar
- Town
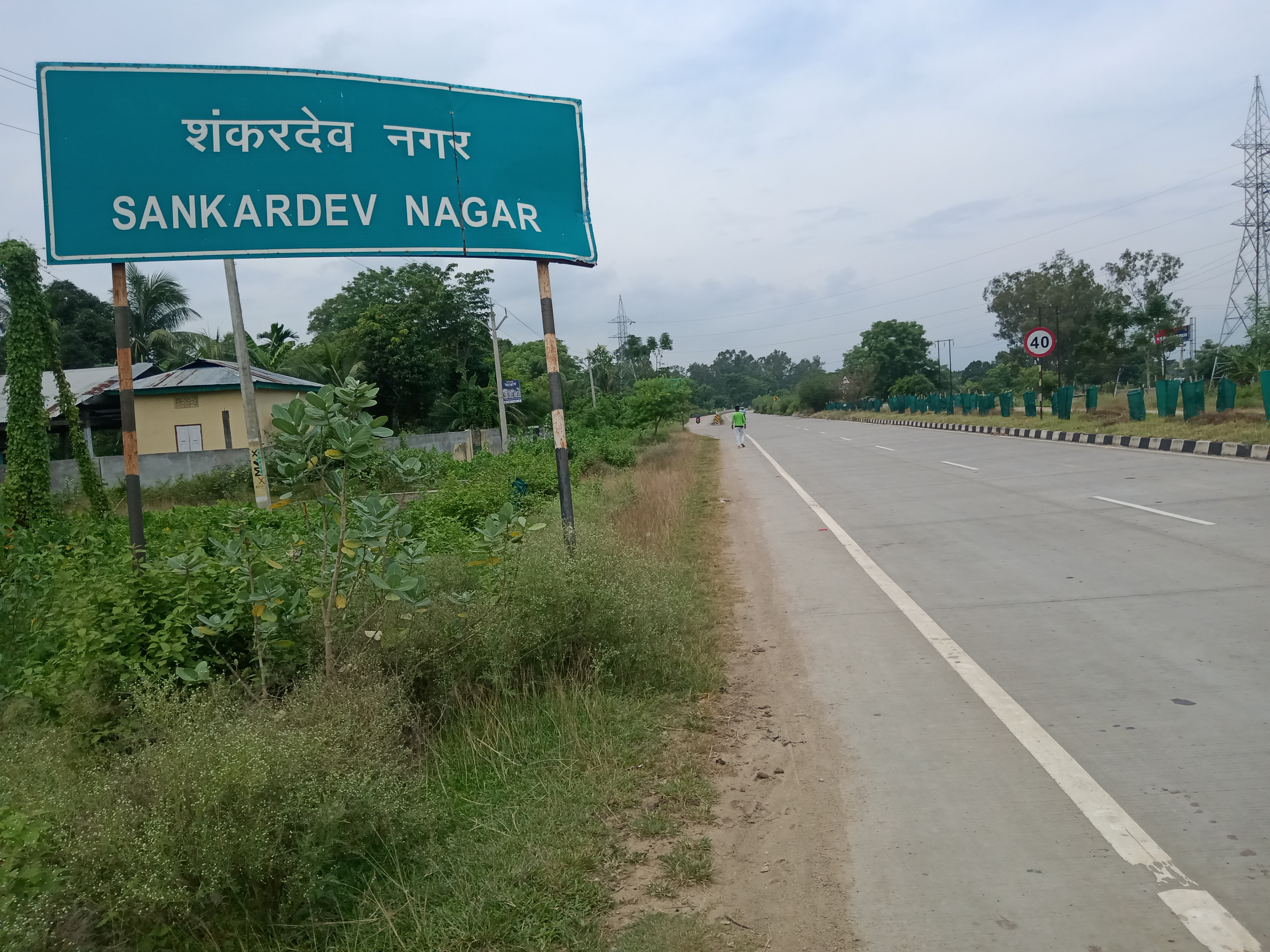
- Nickname: Sankar dev
- Country: India
- State: Assam
- Region: Central Assam
- District: Hojai

Government
  - Type: Town
- Time zone: UTC+5:30 (IST)
- PIN: 782442
- ISO 3166 code: IN-AS
- Climate: Cwa
- Official Language: Assamese and Manipuri

Sankardev Nagar, officially Srimanta Sankardev Nagar is a town and headquarter of newly created Hojai district in the Indian state of Assam. It was made headquarter of newly created Hojai district in 2015. Assamese and Manipuri are the official languages of the town.

== Transport ==
=== Road ===
National Highway-27 pass through the town. It is 171 km away from state capital of Assam, Guwahati.

=== Railway ===
Hojai railway station is the nearest railway station. It is 8km away.

== Gallery ==
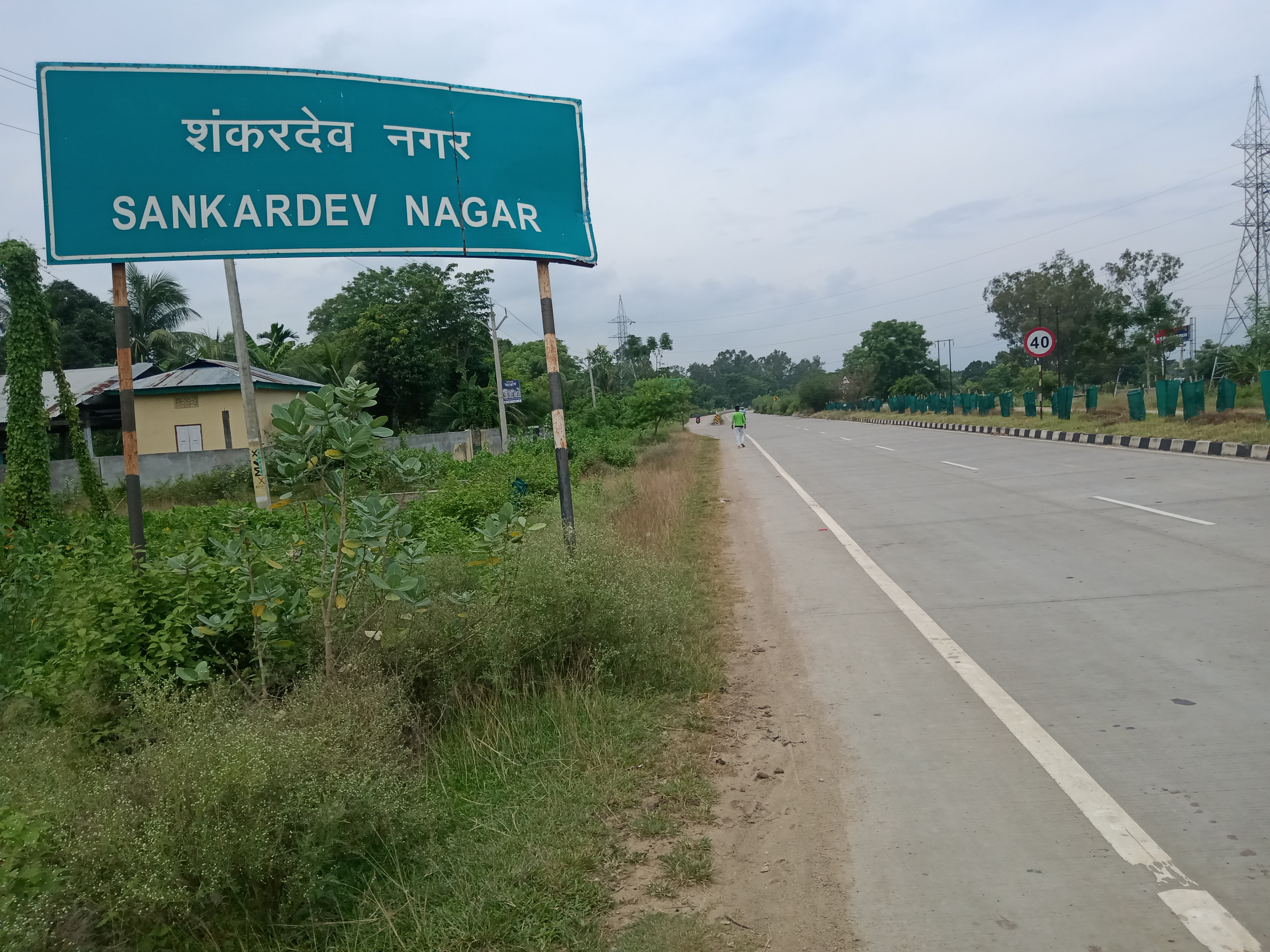
Sankardev Nagar signboard on NH-27

== See also ==
- Hojai
- Lanka
