= Upper Assam division =

- Division
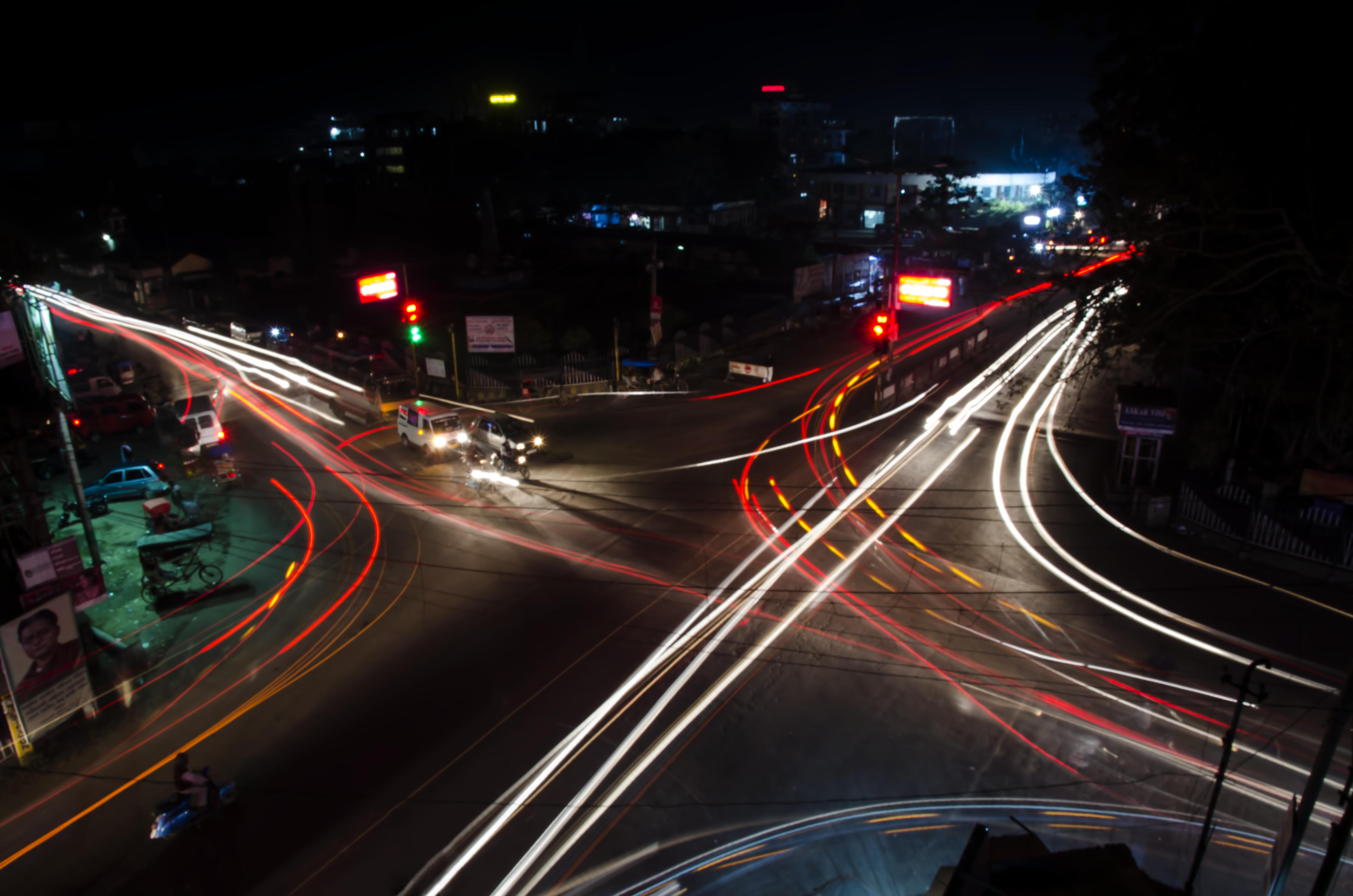
- Jorhat, the 3rd biggest city of Assam

- The five divisions of Assam
- Country: India
- State: Assam

Population (2021)
  - Total: 7.69 million
- Time zone: UTC +05:30 (IST)

Upper Assam division or Ujanidesh is an administrative division of the state of Assam comprising the undivided Lakhimpur and Sivasagar (previously, Sivasagar) districts, of the upper reaches of the Brahmaputra Valley. The other divisions are: Lower Assam, North Assam and Hills and Barak Valley. The division is under the jurisdiction of a Commissioner.³

Consisting of 7 districts initially, the Upper Assam division now contains 10 districts, that includes Sivasagar, Jorhat, Dibrugarh, Dhemaji, Golaghat, Charaideo, Lakhimpur, Majuli, Biswanath, and Tinsukia. While Charaideo and Majuli are the newest districts that were raised to district status in 2016, Golaghat and Tinsukia are the biggest districts in terms square kilometre area in the region, raised to the district status in the years of 1987 and 1989 respectively.

Jorhat,^{1} Golaghat^{2} and Dibrugarh^{3} are also the oldest recognised and constantly inhabited urban centres (municipal areas) in the region based on the earliest years of formation of the civic bodies, constituted before the Indian independence of 1947. Jorhat is the Second most developed city of Assam. On 26 January 2025 Honourable Chief Minister of Assam Sri Himanta Biswa Sarmah declared Dibrugarh as Second Capital of Assam and now it serves as the headquarter of upper Assam division. Other cities of upper Assam are Tinsukia, Sivasagar, Lakhimpur, Dhemaji etc.

An extended list of Upper Assam region also includes the districts of Sonitpur. The region is the most productive part of the state of Assam, which is rich in natural resources like coal, oil and natural gas as well as tea plantations.

== History ==
=== Medieval period ===
==== Chutia Kingdom ====
The medieval Chutia Kingdom was on the bank of the river Brahmaputra. It was a powerful kingdom which had ruled in northeastern Assam and the plains and foothill areas of present-day Arunachal Pradesh, with the capital at Sadiya. The kingdom controlled almost the entire region of present Assam districts of Lakhimpur, Dhemaji, Tinsukia and Dibrugarh as well as parts of Sonitpur, Golaghat, Jorhat and Sivasagar districts. In Arunachal Pradesh, it covered the districts bordering Assam.

==== Ahom Kingdom ====
The Ahom Kingdom was a kingdom in the Brahmaputra valley in Assam that maintained its sovereignty for nearly 600 years and successfully resisted Mughal expansion in North-East India. Established by Sukaphaa, a Tai prince from Mong Mao, it began as a Mong in the upper reaches of the Brahmaputra River. It expanded suddenly under Suhungmung in the 16th century after annexing the Chutia kingdom and parts of Kachari kingdom and therefore became multi-ethnic in character. The kingdom became weaker with the rise of the Moamoria rebellion, and subsequently fell to a succession of Burmese invasions. With the defeat of the Burmese after the First Anglo-Burmese War and the Treaty of Yandabo in 1826, control of the kingdom passed into British (East India Company) hands.

== Demographics ==
The Upper Assam division, comprising 28 percent of Assam's population at 7.69 million, predominantly adheres to Hinduism embraced by nearly 90 percent of its people. More than 90 percent of the people speak Assamese. The major communities of Upper assam are Ahom, Chutia, Tea tribes, Mishing, Sonowal Kacharis, Morans, Matak, Deori, Thengal Kacharis and indigenous Assamese Muslim communities like Gorias Morias and others living here from thousands of years

== Gallery ==
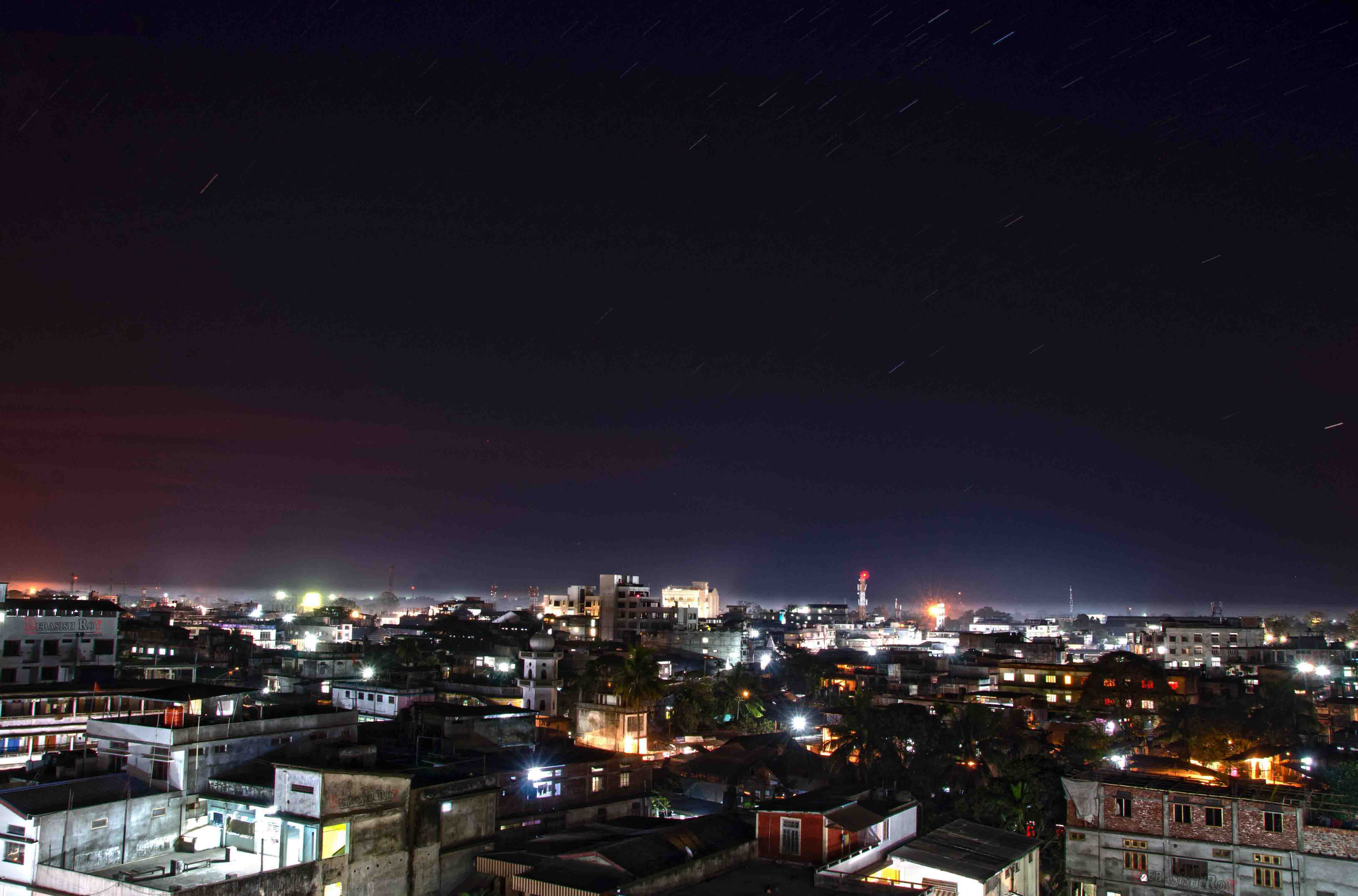
Dibrugarh
Night view of Dibrugarh

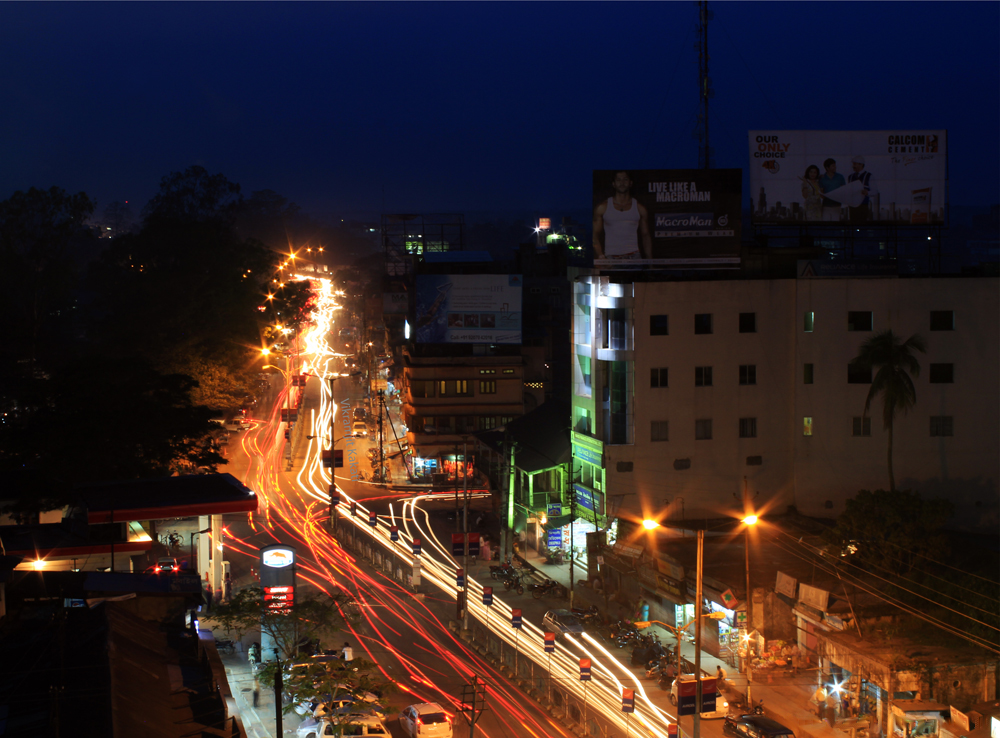
Jorhat
Evening view of Jorhat

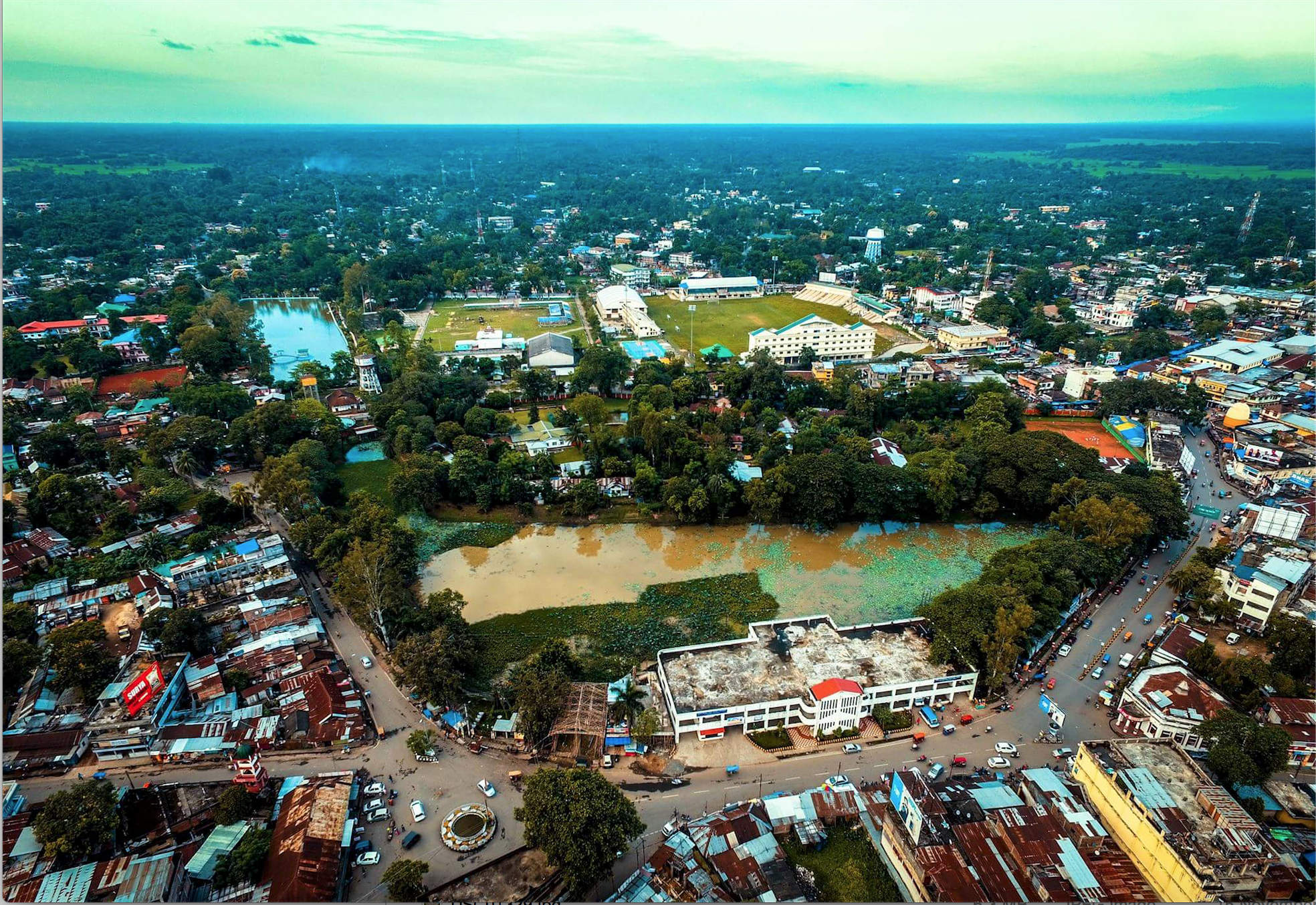
Golaghat
Skyline of Golaghat Central (west)

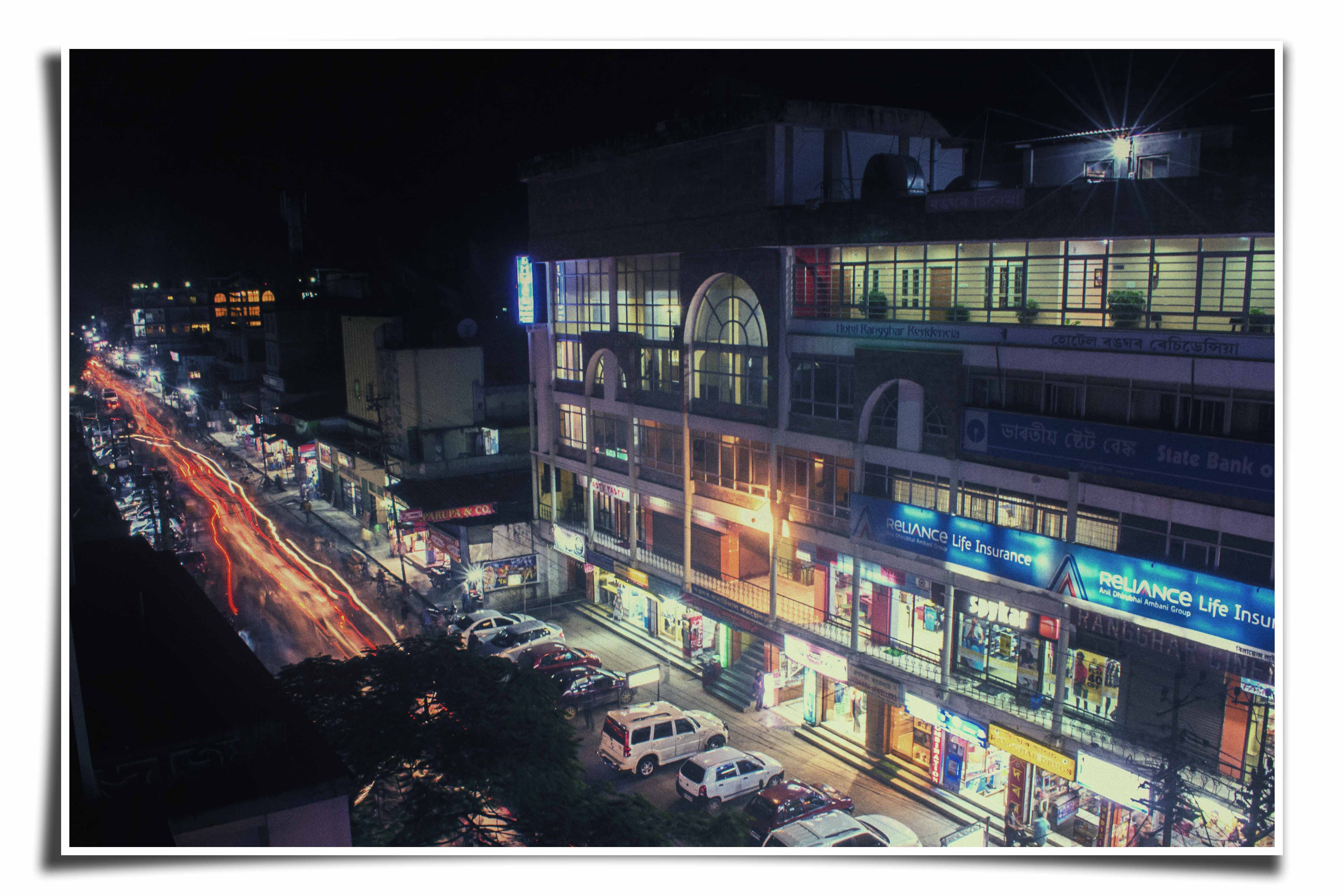
Tinsukia
Evening view of G. N. B. Road, Tinsukia

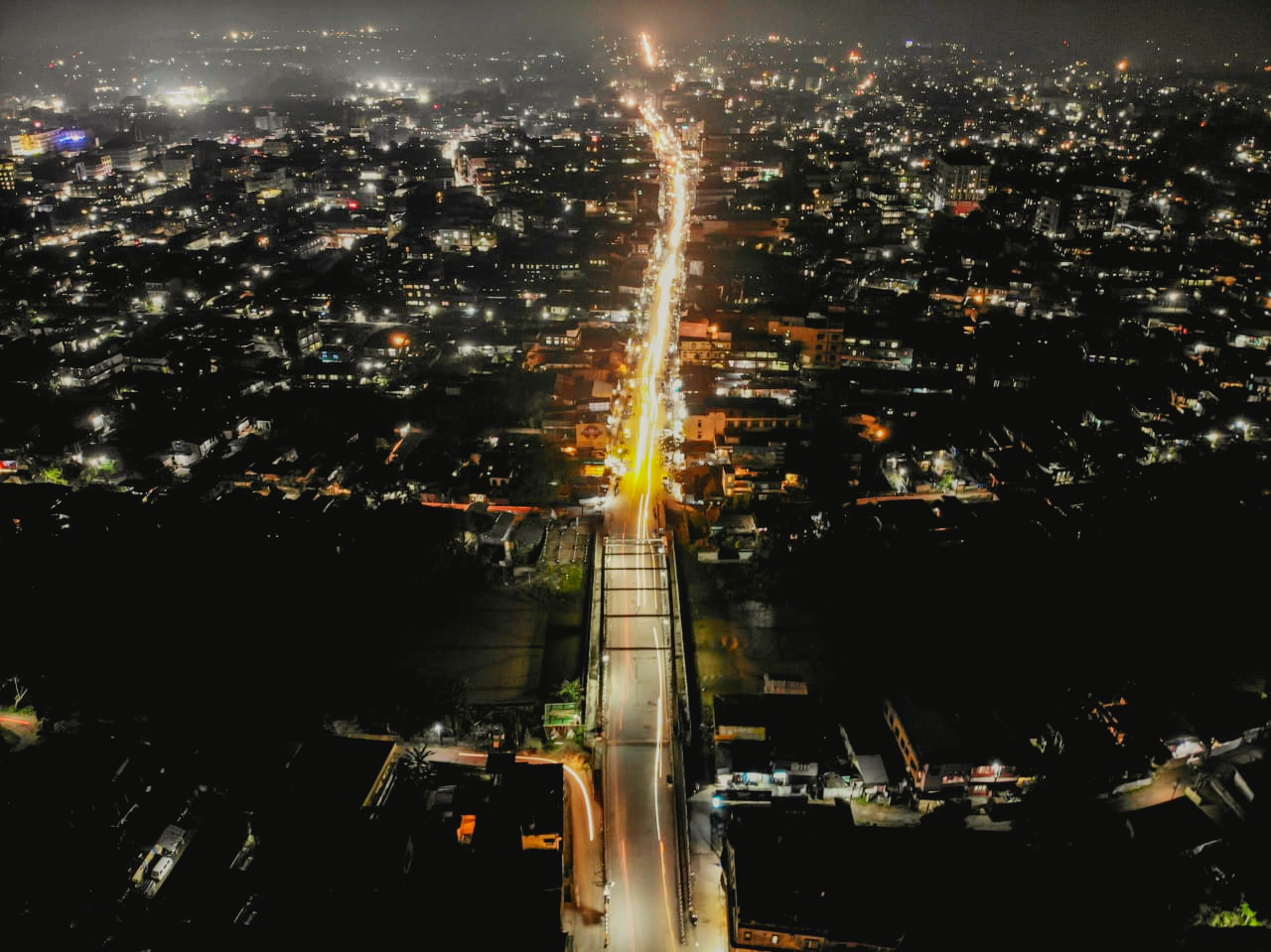
Jorhat, the 2nd biggest city of Assam

== Notes ==
- ^1 Formation of Dibrugarh municipal region, 1873.
- ^2 Formation of Golaghat municipal region, 1920.
- ^3 Formation of Jorhat municipal region, 1909.
