= Sarupeta =

Sarupeta Town
- Town
- Sarupeta Town
- Nickname: Sarupeta Town
- Location in Assam, India Sarupeta Town (India)
- Coordinates: 26.49°N 91.07°E
- Country: India
- State: Assam
- District: Bajali

Government
  - Type: Municipal Committee
  - Body: Sarupeta Municipal Committee
- Elevation: 35 m (115 ft)

Population (2022)
  - Total: 166,212
  - Density: 211/km^{2} (550/sq mi)
- Demonym: Sarupeita

Ethnicities
  - Assamese, Bengali, Marwadi: Assamese
- Time zone: UTC+5:30 (IST)
- PIN: 781318
- Vehicle registration: As-15-X-XXXX
- Website: barpeta.nic.in

Sarupeta is a town in Bajali district, India. The town is located 112.8 kilometres (70 mi) north west of Guwahati.

On Feb 18, 2021 for the first time in Assam's history electric locomotive ran on the soil of Assam with successful trial run from Bongaigaon to Sarupeta Stations.

== Etymology ==
The word Sarupeta derives from "Saru" meaning small and "Peta" meaning pond, thus Sarupeta means "land of small ponds".

== Geography ==
It is located at 26.49°N 91.07°E. It has an average elevation of 35 metres (114 feet). It is 44 km away from Manas National Park.

== See also ==
- Dadara
- Uzankuri
- Dolor Pathar
