= Pathsala =

- Town
- Pathsala Town
- Nicknames: Sikhya Nagari, Natya Nagari
- Location in Assam, India Pathsala (India)
- Coordinates: 26.499382°N 91.179271°E
- Country: India
- State: Assam
- District: Bajali

Government
  - Body: Pathsala Municipal Committee
  - No. of Wards: 10

Area
  - Total: 2.74 km^{2} (1.06 sq mi)

Population (2011)
  - Total: 11,242

Languages
  - Official: Assamese
- Time zone: UTC+5:30 (IST)
- PIN: 781325
- Telephone code: 91-3666
- ISO 3166 code: IN-AS
- Vehicle registration: AS

Pathsala is a town in the Bajali District in Assam, India, with a population of nearly 11.5 thousand (according to the 2011 census) and an area of 2.74 square kilometres.

Bajali is a newly formed district of the Indian state of Assam, carved out of the district of Barpeta. It was formed on 10 August 2020 by the government order of former Assam Chief Minister Sarbananda Sonowal. On 31 December 2022, the district was merged with the existing Barpeta district and again On 25 August 2023, Assam Chief Minister Himanta Biswa Sarma announced the decision to recreate the merged district of Bajali from its original districts.

== Demographics ==
As of 2011 Indian Census, Pathsala is divided into 10 wards, and elections for the Town Area Committee are held every 5 years.

=== Population ===
Pathsala has a population of 11,242, of which 5,824 (51.8%) are males and 5,418 (48.19%) females. The number of children aged of 0-6 is 1040, which is 9.25% of the total population.

	Total	General (Including other categories)	Schedule Caste	Schedule Tribe	Child
Total	11,242	10,680	350	212	1,040
Male	5,824	5,540	187	97	544
Female	5,418	5,140	163	115	496

=== Sex ratio ===
There are 930 females per 1000 male in Pathsala (TC). Overall sex ratio in the city has increased by 89 females per 1000 male during the years from 2001 to 2011. Child sex ratio here has decreased by 33 girls per 1000 boys during the same time.

Castewise sex ratio (females per 1000 male) (2011)
	Total	General (Including other categories)	SC	ST	Child
2011	930	928	872	1186	945

=== Literacy ===
Total 9467 people in the city are literate, among them 5029 are male and 4438 are female. Literacy rate (children under 6 are excluded) of Pathsala is 93%. 95% of male and 90% of female population are literate here. Overall literacy rate in the city has increased by 4%. Male literacy has gone up by 2% and female literacy rate has gone up by 6%.

=== Worker's profile ===
	Worker (Among total population)	Main Worker (Among workers)	Marginal Worker (Among workers)	Non Worker (Among total population)
Total	33.3%	29.4%	3.9%	66.7%
Male	49.8%	45.3%	4.5%	50.2%
Female	15.5%	12.2%	3.3%	84.5%

Pathsala Town Committee administers over 2,759 houses, to which it supplies basic amenities, like water and sewerage. It is also authorized to build roads within the Town Committee limits and impose taxes on properties coming under its jurisdiction.

== Culture ==
=== Mobile theatres ===
Pathsala is a focal point of mobile theatre, popularly known as Bhramyaman Theatre, in Assam. These groups, similar to the Jatra groups of Bengal, have carved a special niche as mass entertainers in Northeast India, arranging shows throughout Assam and some of its neighbouring states. Sessions usually start from June/July every year, putting up plays from the month August/September and concluding the session in March/April. Every group has their own set of artists and technicians, along with stages, pandals, and other electric and sound equipment, which they carry to the remotest parts of the region. At present, Pathsala boasts three prominent Bhramyaman groups, namely The Kohinoor Theatre, The Aabahan Theatre and The Rajmukut Theatre.Nataraj Theatre, the first mobile theatre of Assam, originated in pathsala

=== Devadasi dance ===
The famous Deodhani Dance, entirely different from its South Indian form, has Pathsala as its home. Assam's Devadasi dance is a 1,000-year-old tradition, prevalent since the 7th century when the Devadasi system was in place. Girls were offered to Saiva, Sakta and Vaishnava temples to dance as part of a daily ritual. Ancient texts like the Kalika Purana and Yogini Tantra carry references to this ritualistic dance practice. It is said that Bishnu Prasad Rabha, on seeing it performed, worked for the promotion and spread of this dance form. Dilip Kakati is the person who currently trains a group of girls, in an attempt to save this art.

== Education ==
Pathsala is among the top educational hubs in Assam, producing toppers in both SEBA and AHSEC Exams.

Bajali Higher Secondary School, established in 1926 and Bajali College (now upgraded to Bhattadev University) established in 1955 are the oldest educational institutions in the area.

Apart from these government funded institutions, there are several private institutions. Shankardev Shishu Vidya Niketan, Pathsala Sikshapith Adarsha High School and Junior College, Anundoram Borooah Academy, Krishna Kanta Handiqui Senior Secondary School and Degree College etc. are some of private institutions of note.

== Transportation ==
- Railways: Pathsala Town is well connected by Indian Railways with places like Kolkata, Guwahati, Barpeta Road, Rangiya, Bongaigaon etc.

This is a list of trains to different places from Pathsala:

Train Number (Up/Down)	Train Name	Train Type
55713 / 55714	Rangiya Junction - New Jalpaiguri Passenger	Passenger
55801 / 55802	Manas Rhino Passenger	Passenger
15469 / 15470	Alipur Duar Junction - Lumding Express	Express
55809 / 55810	Guwahati - New Bongaigaon Junction Passenger	Passenger
55753 / 55754	Alipur Duar Junction - Guwahati SIFUNG Passenger	Passenger
15471 / 15472	Alipur Duar - Kamakhya InterCity Express	Express
15959 / 15960	Kamrup Express	Express

- Roads: The National Highway 31 (India) runs through Pathsala and has connectivity to all parts of Assam. The National Highway 152 (India), connecting Bhutan with Assam, starts from Pathsala.

== Places to visit ==
Jalikhata village (also known as Kalibari Than), located near Pathsala, is home to a Shiva temple and a large banyan tree on the bank of the Kaldia River, which spreads over approximately four bighas of land. Believed to be over 200 years old, it is considered one of the oldest living banyan trees in India and is claimed to be the largest tree in the Asian subcontinent, although no official documentation of the claim exists. The tree attracts visitors throughout the year, and has in the past drawn scholars from Korea and Japan; villagers mark its anniversary on World Environment Day with plantation drives. The tree faces an erosion threat from the Kaldia River, which flows within roughly 30 metres of its trunk and submerges part of it during floods.
