= Jalah (town) =

Jalah Jalahghat
- Census Town
- Interactive map of Jalah
- Country: India
- State: Assam
- District: Baksa

Government
  - Type: village panchayat

Languages
  - Regional: Assamese,
- Time zone: UTC+5:30 (IST)
- Postal code: 781327

Jalah is a census town situated in Baksa district of Assam, India.

== Geography ==
The total geographical area of Jalah census town is 7 square kilometers which makes it the biggest census town by area in the Baksa district.

== Demographics ==
According to the 2011 Indian Census, the total population of Jalah is 6,468 out of which 3,283 are males and 3,185 are females. The literacy rate of Jalah is 82.8 percent which is higher compared to 75.5 percent literacy rate of Baksa district.

== Transport ==
Changsari railway station is approximately 2 km away from the Jalah Census Town.

Lokpriya Gopinath Bordoloi International Airport is approximately 71.3 km away from Jalah.

== Climate ==
The average annual rainfall in the census town is 1113 millimeters. The maximum temperature goes up to 35 °C and minimum temperature goes down to 8 °C.
