= Charaideo district =

Coordinates: 26.933°N 94.7481°E

- District of Assam
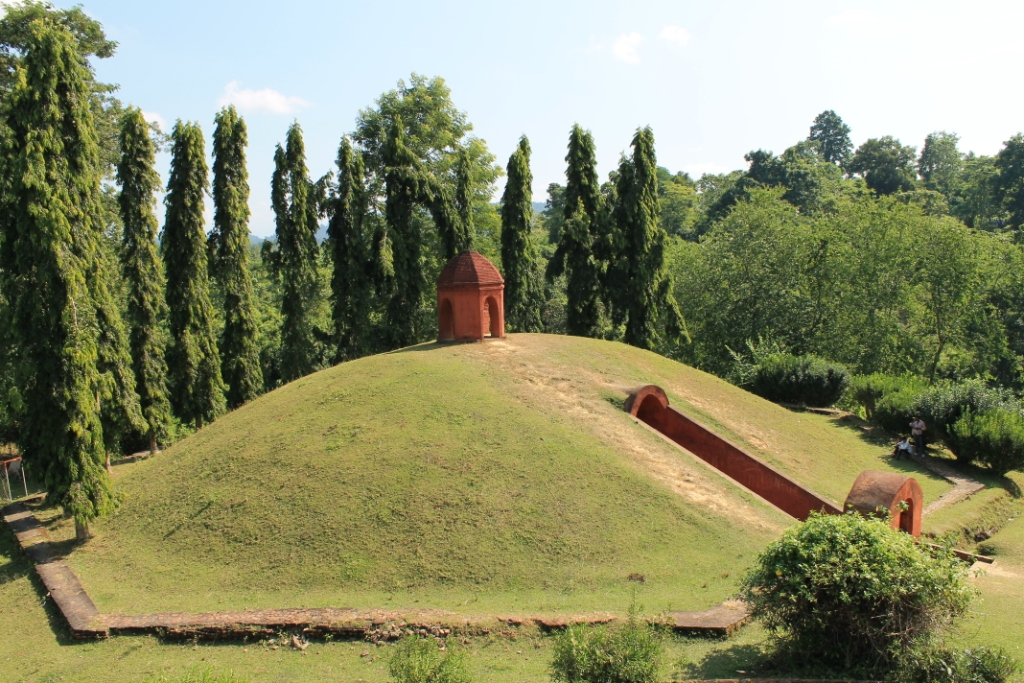
- Maidam of Ahom Kings

- Location in Assam
- Country: India
- State: Assam
- Division: Upper Assam
- Established: 2015
- Headquarters: Sonari

Government
  - Lok Sabha constituencies: Jorhat
  - Vidhan Sabha constituencies: Mahmara, Sonari

Area
  - Total: 1,300 km^{2} (500 sq mi)

Population (2011)
  - Total: 471,418
  - Density: 360/km^{2} (940/sq mi)

Languages
  - Official: Assamese
- Time zone: UTC+5:30 (IST)
- Vehicle registration: AS 33
- Website: charaideo.assam.gov.in

Charaideo district is an administrative district in the state of Assam in India. It was formally declared a new district of the state on 15 August 2015 by then Chief Minister of Assam Tarun Gogoi. It was carved out of Sivasagar district. It comes under Upper Assam division.

== Etymology ==
Charaideo was established by the first Ahom king Chaolung Sukaphaa. The name Charaideo originated from Tai-Ahom word Che Rai Doi or Doi Che Rai which means the shining city on the hills. The Che-Rai-Doi Assamised into Charaideo or Charai-khorong.

== History ==
Before the arrival of Sukaphaa the place was a place of worship for local tribes like Morans, Borahis and Chutias.

The site of Charaideo was the capital of the Ahom kingdom established by the first Ahom king Chao Lung Siu-Ka-Pha in 1253. The Maidams (tumulus) of the Ahom kings and queens at Charaideo hillocks resemble the shape of small pyramids. The site has had some archaeological works but also has suffered from robbers. There have been calls for the site to be UNESCO World Heritage listed.

During the reign of Sudangphaa (1397–1407), the relatively small Ahom kingdom was attacked by Mong Kwang, a Shan state in what is today Upper Burma. A Mong Kwang army sent under General Ta-chin-Pao advanced upto Tipam but was subsequently defeated and pushed back as far as the Kham Jang territory. The generals of the two armies conducted a peace treaty on the shore of the Nong Jake lake and in accordance with the Tai custom dipped their hands in the lake, fixing the boundary of the two kingdoms at Patkai hills.

== Demographics ==
Religions in Charaideo district (2011)
Religion	Percent
Hinduism	88.00%
Christianity	5.24%
Islam	4.58%
Other (tribal religion)	1.25%
Buddhism	0.72%
Other or not stated	0.21%

The district has a population of 471,418, of which 29,723 (6.31%) live in urban areas. Charaideo has a sex ratio of 955 females per 1000 males. Scheduled Castes and Scheduled Tribes make up 7,643 (1.62%) and 11,909 (2.53%) of the population respectively.

Languages of Charaideo district (2011)
1. Assamese (75.6%)
2. Sadri (7.64%)
3. Bengali (4.22%)
4. Odia (3.20%)
5. Hindi (1.92%)
6. 'Other' Hindi (1.80%)
7. Nepali (1.38%)
8. Others (4.20%)

At the time of the 2011 census, 75.64% of the population spoke Assamese, 7.64% Sadri, 4.22% Bengali, 3.20% Odia, 1.92% Hindi, 1.38% Nepali. 1.80% of the population spoke 'Others' under Hindi.

== See also ==
- Charaideo
- Sivasagar
- Sonari
- Moranhat
