= Hojai district =

- District of Assam
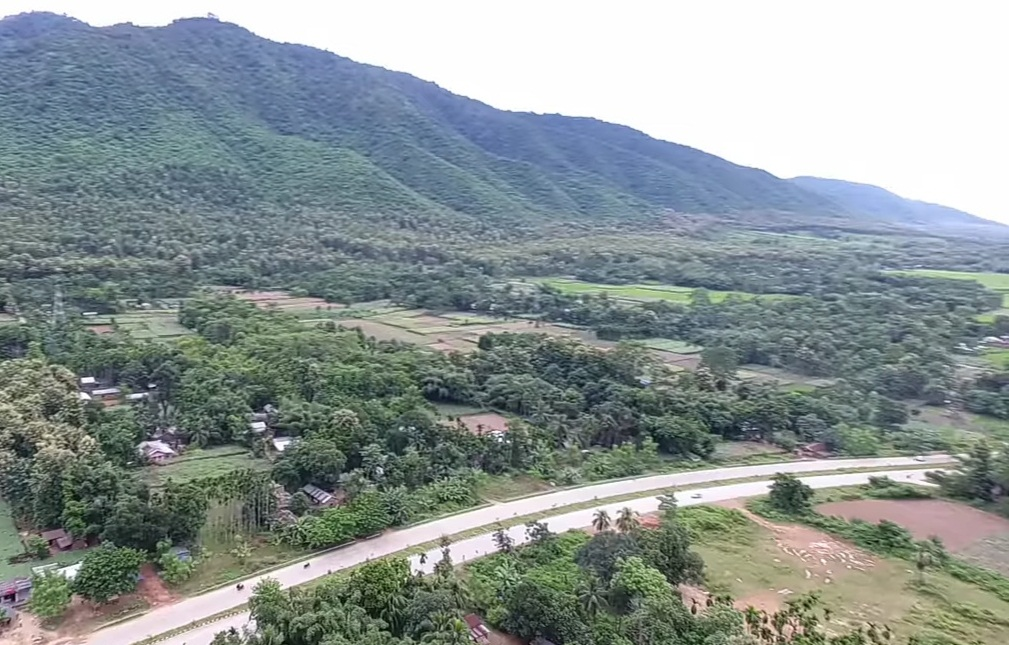
- Interactive map of Hojai district
- Coordinates (Hojai): 26.0°N 92.87°E
- Country: India
- State: Assam
- Division: Central Assam
- Headquarters: Sankardev Nagar, Hojai
- Tehsils: 3

Government
  - Lok Sabha constituencies: Nagaon
  - Vidhan Sabha constituencies: Binnakandi, Hojai, Lumding

Area
  - Total: 1,686 km^{2} (651 sq mi)

Population (2011)
  - Total: 931,218
  - Density: 552.3/km^{2} (1,431/sq mi)
- Time zone: UTC+05:30 (IST)
- District & Sessions Judge: Sri Aditya Hazarika, AJS
- Official language: Assamese
- Associate official language: Meitei (Manipuri)
- Chief Judicial Magistrate: Sri Shakti Sharma, AJS, M.COM, LLB.
- Website: hojai.assam.gov.in

Hojai district is a district in Assam, India. It was formed on 15 August 2015. The headquarters of the district is situated at Sankardev Nagar, which is about 8 km away from Hojai town. Hojai District was formed from three tehsils of Nagaon District, namely Hojai, Doboka and Lanka. Hojai was a part of the undivided Nowgong district (now Nagaon) of then Assam Province.

On 31 December 2022, the district was temporarily remerged into Nagaon district. On 25 August 2023, the Assam cabinet reinstated Hojai's district status.

== Etymology ==
Hojai is a surname commonly used by the Dimasa community. The word ‘Hojai’ is of Dimasa origin. The priestly class of the Dimasas is known as Hojai or Hojaisa and the place they inhabited came to be known as Hojai. Even now Hojai area has a sizeable population of Dimasas and some of them have the surname ‘Hojai’.

== History ==
The geographical area presently under Hojai district and its surrounding area as in the history of the ancient Kamarupa, was known as Davaka kingdom or Kapili Valley kingdom. In different sources this kingdom is mentioned as ‘Dabak’, ‘Kapili’ and ‘Tribeg’. This kingdom enjoyed independent status up to the 6th century CE.

Medieval historical sources mention that during the reign of Kashyap (1365-1400) of the Barahi Pala dynasty there began a new era of Kachari supremacy in the Kapili-Jamuna valley. Birochana, a minister of Kachari origin in the service of king Bhoumapala of Behali area in the north bank of Brahmaputra, had to flee his kingdom after a conflict with the king. He came to the south bank of Brahmaputra and established a new kingdom on the banks of the Kalong river which was Brahmapur or the present day Batampur. He then assumed the name ‘Bicharpatipha’. Soon Kachari reign spread to the entire Kapili-Jamuna valley and the name of the kingdom was known as Kacharipar.

Due to Ahoms kingdom's vigorous territorial expansion, the Kachari kings came into conflict with them. During the rule of Kachari king Tamradhwaja Narayan, the Kachari ruled areas went to the Ahoms under Swargadeo Gadadhar Singha.

In the modern day, Hojai saw a large influx of Sylheti Hindu refugees after Sylhet went to Pakistan. In 1993, the Hojai riots broke out between Hindus and Muslims over tensions related to the Babri Masjid demolition.

== Demographics ==
=== Population ===
According to the Indian Census of 2011, the three tehsils in the newly formed Hojai District had a population of 931,218, of which 172,350 (18.51%) live in urban areas. Hojai has a sex ratio of 954 females per 1000 males. Scheduled Castes and Scheduled Tribes make up 109,437 (11.75%) and 28,731 (3.09%) respectively.

=== Religion ===
Religions in Hojai district (2011)
Religion	Percent
Islam	53.65%
Hinduism	45.53%
Christianity	0.55%
Other or not stated	0.27%

Among the population, 499,565 are Muslim and 424,065 are Hindu, constituting 53.65% and 45.53% of the district population respectively. Christians are 5,081.

After the Sylhet referendum which led to separation of Sylhet Division from then Assam Province, a large number of Bengali Hindus have migrated to the area from the then East Pakistan and are mostly settled in the towns of Lumding, Lanka and Hojai.

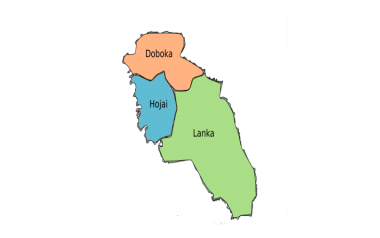

Tehsil wise religious data in Hojai district
Tehsil	Total	Muslim	Hindu	Muslim %	Hindu %
Hojai	228,530	92,590	135,377	40.52%	59.24%
Dabaka	303,767	265,366	37,872	87.35%	12.47%
Lanka	398,921	141,609	250,816	35.50%	62.87%
Total (2011)	931,218	499,565	424,065	53.65%	45.53%

=== Languages ===
Languages of Hojai district (2011)
1. Bengali (52.7%)
2. Assamese (33.7%)
3. Hindi (4.31%)
4. Meitei (1.91%)
5. Dimasa (1.31%)
6. Bhojpuri (1.21%)
7. Others (4.87%)

Assamese and Meitei (Manipuri) are the official languages of this place.

At the time of the 2011 census, 52.67% of the population spoke Bengali, 33.72% Assamese, 4.31% Hindi, 1.91% Meitei, 1.31% Dimasa and 1.21% Bhojpuri as their first language.

== Administration ==
=== Judiciary ===
The Judicial Court at Hojai was established on 20 October 1982 and functioning as Court of Judicial Magistrate First Class. The Courts of Additional District and Sessions Judge(Fast Track Court), Sub-Divisional Judicial Magistrate, Munsiff cum JMFC Courts were later added under District Judiciary, Nagaon.

On 6 March 2021, Hon'ble Mr. Justice Suman Shyam, Judge Guahati High Court, inaugurated the Newly created Courts of District & Sessions Judge and Chief Judicial Magistrate at Hojai, Sankardev Nagar. Sri Aditya Hazarika became the first District & Sessions Judge and Sri Shakti Sharma became the first Chief Judicial Magistrate of Hojai District.

=== Politics ===
Hojai district has three assembly constituencies. They are Jamunamukh, Hojai and Lumding. Hojai district is also part of Nowgong constituency.

== See also ==
- Hojai
- Dabaka
- Lanka
