= Lanka (town) =

Town in India

- Town
- Location in Assam, India Lanka (India)
- Coordinates: 25.92°N 92.95°E
- Country: India
- State: Assam
- District: Hojai

Government
  - Body: Lanka Municipality Board

Population (2022)
  - Total: 52,435 (town) 398,921 (circle)

Languages
  - Official Languages: Assamese
  - Associate official language: Meitei (Manipuri)
  - Most spoken language: Bengali
- Time zone: UTC+5:30 (IST)
- PIN: 782446
- Telephone code: 03674
- ISO 3166 code: IN-AS
- Vehicle registration: AS 31

Lanka is a town located in Hojai District of Assam, and a municipal board with 11 wards. It serves as a trade and commerce hub for nearby areas such as Udali, Nokhuti, Laskar Pather, Karikhana, Kheroni, Dablong, and Doiyong sides. It is connected to other cities/states such as Guwahati by NH27.

== Etymology ==
The name Lanka was likely named after Lanka of Ramayana; famous Assamese poet Madhava Kandali was said to be an inhabitant of Lanka, who wrote the Saptakanda Ramayana, under the patronage of Varāha-Rājā Mahamanikya.

== History ==
The name ‘Dabak’ is a derivative of the Sanskrit word ‘Devark.’ In olden times, water was scarce, and then by the regional language Lang Kha means the same, hence the name of the place came into being.

During that time the place was barren land. During the British invasions, water was brought by wagons and this place was also made the base camps. It was only after the 1950 Assam–Tibet earthquake that the water level rose again.

Rangmahala, a place in the outskirts of Lanka, had the King's amusement palace or Rangmahal. After the rulers abandoned Lanka, Khasi-Jayantiya started to rule.

When King Viswasundar was the ruler of DABAK, Lanka was an independent state. An inscription of the 13th century discovered near Dabaka has the following lines about Lanka:

“ Kachhar rajyad jayantay lankanta rajyabanta Yajnamenong daabeka mandali mathastha karyamasa.” The Lankeswari Temple is of historical significance for the place. It is very much linked to the heart and culture of Lanka.

In 1505, the first prophet of the Sikhs, Guru Nanak Dev, had visited Kamrup, Assam. This fact is recorded in the documents concerning the numerous journeys undertaken by Guru Nanak in various stages of his life. It is said that he had Srimanta Shankardeva, the founder of the Mahapuruxiya Dharma as the Guru travelled from Dhaka to Assam.

After this journey by the first Guru, Ninth Guru or prophet of Sikhs Guru Tegh Bahadur also visited Assam in 1668. This was when the armies of Aurangzeb tried their best to cross the Brahmaputra river and enter Assam. They were thoroughly routed by the Ahom general Lachit Borphukan. The Guru visited the place called Dhubri; a famous Sikh Gurudwara was constructed to commemorate his visit. Every year Sikhs from all over India and foreign lands visit this holy place. The grateful Ahom King invited Guruji to the Kamakhya shrine, where he was honoured.

While some died and some came back to Punjab, a few stayed on and made Assam their home, raising families. Their descendants today — mainly concentrated in the Nagaon district — are Assamese for all practical purposes, and none speaks Punjabi, but continue to maintain their Sikh identity and observe most tenets and traditions of the religion.

== Geography ==
Lanka town of Hojai District, Assam, is located about 11 km from the district headquarters Sankardev Nagar. It is within a rain-shadow region because of its unique location between the West Jaintia Hills to the west and the Mikir Hills to the east.

== Demographics ==
=== Population ===
As of the 2001 India census, Lanka is a municipal board having 11 wards, with a population of 36,805. Males constitute 52% of the population and females constitute 48%. Lanka has an average literacy rate of 86.85%, higher than the national average of 72.19%: male literacy is 91.20%, and female literacy is 82.28%.

=== Language ===
Languages spoken in Lanka town (2011)
1. Bengali (81.6%)
2. Assamese (7.92%)
3. Hindi (6.54%)
4. others (3.90%)

Assamese and Meitei (Manipuri) are the official languages of the town.

Lanka town has a population of 36,805 as of the 2011 census. Bengalis form the majority of the town's population, having Bengali speakers at 30,051 constituting the largest majority, while Assamese speakers are 2,918 as the second-largest minority in the circle, Hindi is spoken by 2,408 people, while other languages constitute 3.9% of the population.

== Transport ==
=== Road ===
Lanka town is connected by the erstwhile National Highway 54 connecting nearby Dabaka (25 km) with Silchar (305 km). This highway is now numbered as NH-27, a North–South and East–West Corridor connecting Porbander in Gujarat to Silchar in Assam. The highway is being developed as a four-lane highway by the National Highways Authority of India. The town is about 185 km. by road from Guwahati.

=== Railway ===
Lanka is also served by a railway line which Guwahati - Lumding BG line connecting to all parts of Assam and also to Delhi, Howrah, etc. The town is about 150 km by rail from Guwahati.
