= Central Assam division =

- Division of Assam
- The five divisions of Assam
- Country: India
- State: Assam
- Capital: Nagaon, Guwahati
- Notable places: Nagaon, Hojai and Jagiroad

Area
  - Total: 21,001 km^{2} (8,109 sq mi)

Population (2011 census)
  - Total: 4,342,814
  - Density: 206.79/km^{2} (535.59/sq mi)

Central Assam division is an administrative division of Assam under the jurisdiction of a Division Commissioner, who is officially stationed at Guwahati Nagaon. It consists of the following districts: Dima Hasao, Kamrup Metropolitan Karbi Anglong, West Karbi Anglong, Hojai, Nagaon and Marigaon.

== Districts ==
Hills and Central Assam division comprises mainly 6 districts, Dima Hasao, Karbi Anglong, West Karbi Anglong, Hojai, Nagaon and Marigaon.

| Code | District | Headquarter | Population (2011) | Area (km^{2}) | Density (/km^{2}) |
|---|---|---|---|---|---|
| NG | Nagaon | Nagaon | 1,892,550 | 2,287 | 830 |
| MG | Morigaon | Morigaon | 957,423 | 1,704 | 560 |
| KA | Karbi Anglong^{#} | Diphu | 660,955 | 10,434 | 63 |
| HJ | Hojai | Sankardev Nagar | 931,218 | 1,686 | 550 |
| DH | Dima Hasao | Haflong | 214,102 | 4,890 | 43 |
| WK | West Karbi Anglong^{#} | Hamren | 295,358 | 3,035 | 97 |
| Total | 6 | — | 4,342,814 | 20845 | 208.82 |

^{#} Districts within the Karbi Anglong Autonomous Council.

== Demography ==
Total population of Central Assam Division is 5,882,824. Among them, Hindus are 3,010,786, Muslims are 2,590,673, Christians are 248,777 and 32,588 follow other religions.

Religion in Central Assam Division (2011)
1. Hinduism (51.2%)
2. Islam (44.0%)
3. Christianity (4.23%)
4. Others (0.55%)

| District | Hindu | Muslim | Other |
|---|---|---|---|
| Nagaon | 42.33 | 56.20 | 1.47 |
| Hojai | 45.53 | 53.65 | 0.82 |
| Morigaon | 47.20 | 52.56 | 0.24 |
| Dima Hasao | 67.07 | 2.04 | 30.89 |
| United Karbi Anglong | 80.10 | 2.12 | 17.78 |
