= Nagaon district =

Coordinates: 26.3500°N 92.6667°E

- District of Assam
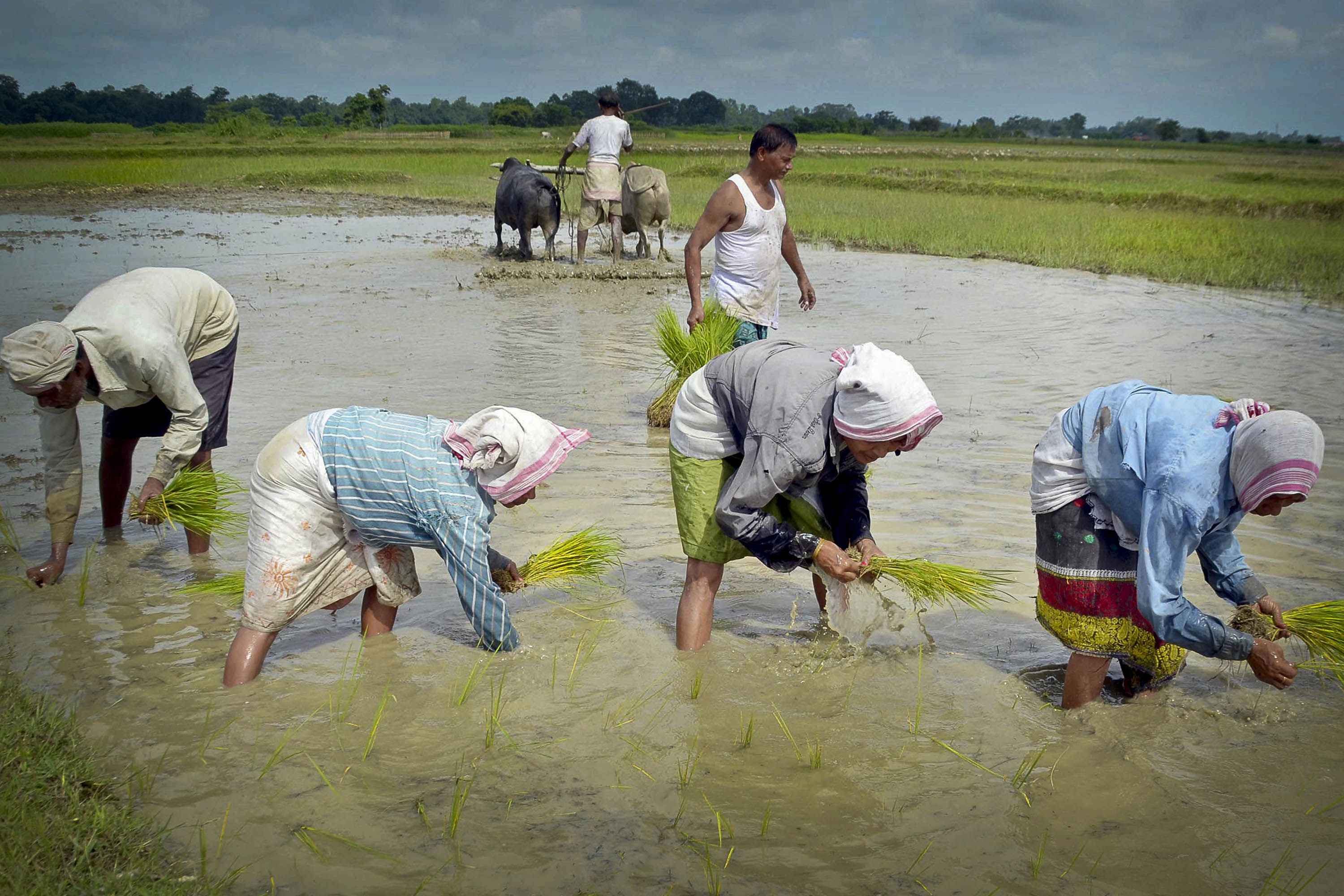
- Nagaon paddy cultivation

- Location in Assam
- Country: India
- State: Assam
- Division: Central Assam
- Headquarters: Nagaon

Government
  - Lok Sabha constituencies: Kaliabor, Nowgong
  - Vidhan Sabha constituencies: Raha, Dhing, Batadroba, Rupohihat, Nowgong, Barhampur, Samaguri, Kaliabor

Area
  - Total: 2,287 km^{2} (883 sq mi)

Population
  - Total: 1,892,550
  - Density: 827.5/km^{2} (2,143/sq mi)
- ISO 3166 code: IN-AS
- Website: nagaon.assam.gov.in

Nagaon district [nɔgaʊ zila] is an administrative district in the Indian state of Assam. At the time of the 2011 census it was the most populous district in Assam, before Hojai district was split from it in 2016. The district headquarters is Nagaon.

== History ==
Located in Assam's heartland, Nagaon lies at the centre of northeast India. The district dates back to 1833. Its British administrators jocularly described Nagaon as a district of the 3 C's; namely: Chickens, Children, and Cases. The region was also called Khagarijan in older records.

In 1983, amidst the Assam Agitation, the Nellie massacre took place in the village of Nellie, and other villages surrounding it. The massacre claimed the lives of 1,600 to 2,000 Bengali Muslims. It was perpetrated by a mob of Tiwa, and Assamese Hindus.

On 15 August 2016, the three tehsils of Nagaon district, namely Hojai, Doboka, and Lanka, were carved out to form the Hojai district.

== Geography ==
The district headquarters are located at Nagaon. A part of the Kaziranga National Park is located within the Nagaon district. The district is bounded by the Brahmaputra river in the north (across the river is Sonitpur district, West Karbi Anglong district and Hojai district in the south, Karbi Anglong district and Golaghat district in the east. The district is a perfect example oxoman (un-even in Assamese) (অসমান) from where the word Assam originated, as it possesses rivers, river valleys, hills, jungles and the plains.

== Demographics ==
Historical population
Year	Pop.	±% p.a.
1901	194,534	—
1911	225,344	+1.48%
1921	297,322	+2.81%
1931	420,263	+3.52%
1941	484,874	+1.44%
1951	662,579	+3.17%
1961	900,537	+3.12%
1971	1,251,636	+3.35%
1991	1,893,171	+2.09%
2001	2,314,629	+2.03%
2011	2,823,768	+2.01%

The population of Nagaon district based on the 2011 Indian census after separation of the newly carved out Hojai district is 1,892,550. The residual district has a sex ratio of 966 females per 1000 males. Scheduled Castes and Scheduled Tribes make up 156,913 (8.29%) and 86,422 (4.57%) respectively.

=== Religion ===
Religion in Nagaon district (2011)
1. Islam (55.4%)
2. Hinduism (43.7%)
3. Others (0.92%)

Population of circles by religion
Circle	Muslims	Hindus	Others
Kaliabor	21.67%	73.03%	5.30%
Samaguri	59.66%	38.57%	1.77%
Rupahi	91.79%	8.00%	0.21%
Dhing	89.86%	9.89%	0.25%
Nagaon	40.02%	58.98%	1.00%
Raha	28.41%	70.22%	1.37%
Kampur	46.72%	51.64%	1.64%

According to 2011 Indian Census, the Muslims form a majority in the district with 10,63,538, making 56.20% of the total population, with Hindus accounting for 801,181, followed by 1.15% Christians. Small populations of Sikhs, Buddhists and Jains also reside in the district. Way back in 1971, Hindus were in majority in Nagaon district (which also included Hojai district at that time) with forming 42.6% of the population, while Muslims were 39.2% at that time.

=== Languages ===
Languages spoken in Nagaon district (2011) (Note: Percentages based on the 2011 census figures minus the population of the newly carved out tehsils that went on to form the Hojai district in 2016)
1. Assamese (77.2%)
2. Bengali (16.8%)
3. Hindi (1.31%)
4. Others (4.77%)

According to the 2011 census, 77.17% of the population speaks Assamese, 16.75% Bengali, and 1.31% Hindi as their first language.

== Economy ==
Agriculture is the backbone of the district and of Assam state. Rice is the principal crop and is the staple food. Fisheries are another major economy of Nagaon. In the village, a few brick manufacturing industries are opened, where illiterate people work.

== Culture ==
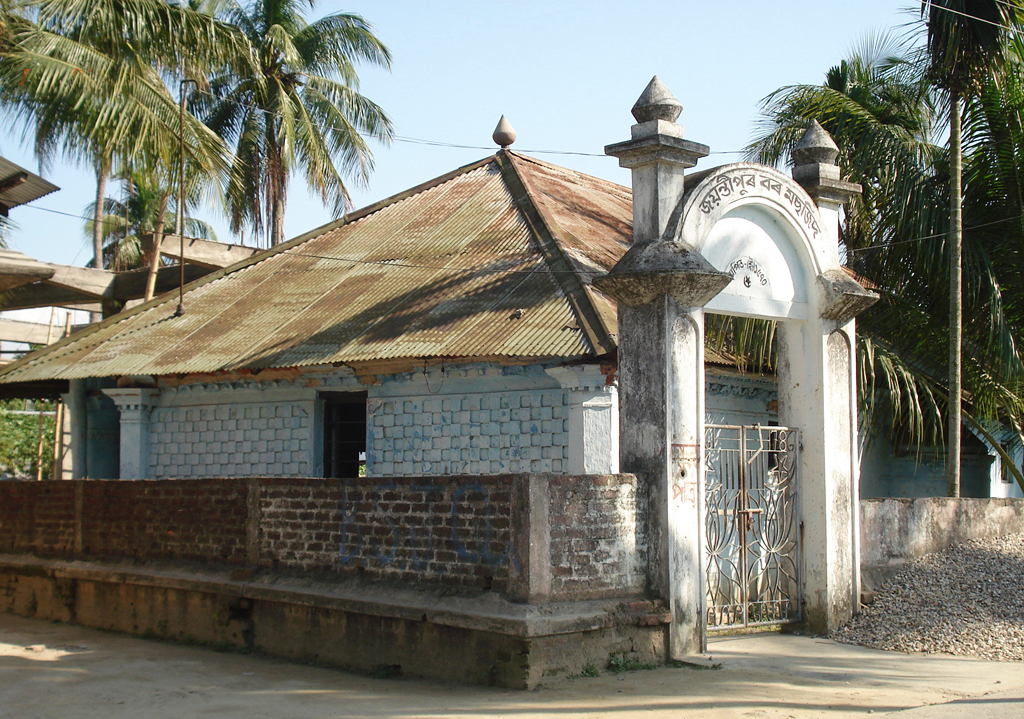
The Jayantipur Bor Mosque (est. 1570) in Kuwaritol

Many Namghars and associated templates are in Nagaon. These include the Bharali Namghar, which is situated in Hatbar and Borduwa Namghar. This namghar is situated in Nagaon Sattra, where Mahapurush Sankardev was born. Saubhagya Madhav, Dulal Madhav and Gopal Madhav are temples built during the reign of the Ahom King Shiba Singha.

Islamic Culture

The District has one of the largest Muslim population. Many masjid are present in all over the district (mainly rural). Eid is celebrated by Muslim every year. Ruja is integral part of Muslim society. Puranigudam Jame Masjid is known as a symbol of communal harmony in the district.

Because of the majority Muslim population converted from Animism to Islam.Respecting things made of nature is considered as cultural.

Language is considered mainly as cultural identity.Almost all Muslim are bilingual.They can fluently speak Assamese and dialect of Bengali.

== Attractions ==
=== Bordowa ===
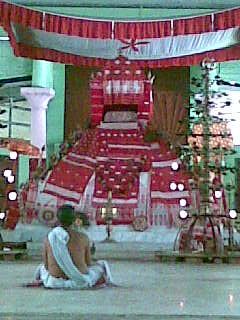
Bordowa than

This is the birthplace of Mahapurush Srimanta Sankardev (1449-1568) the artist, author, founder of Vaishnavism religion and dramatist. The two Sattras are Narowa Sattra and Salaguri Sattras. The mini Museum is there in Narowa Sattras

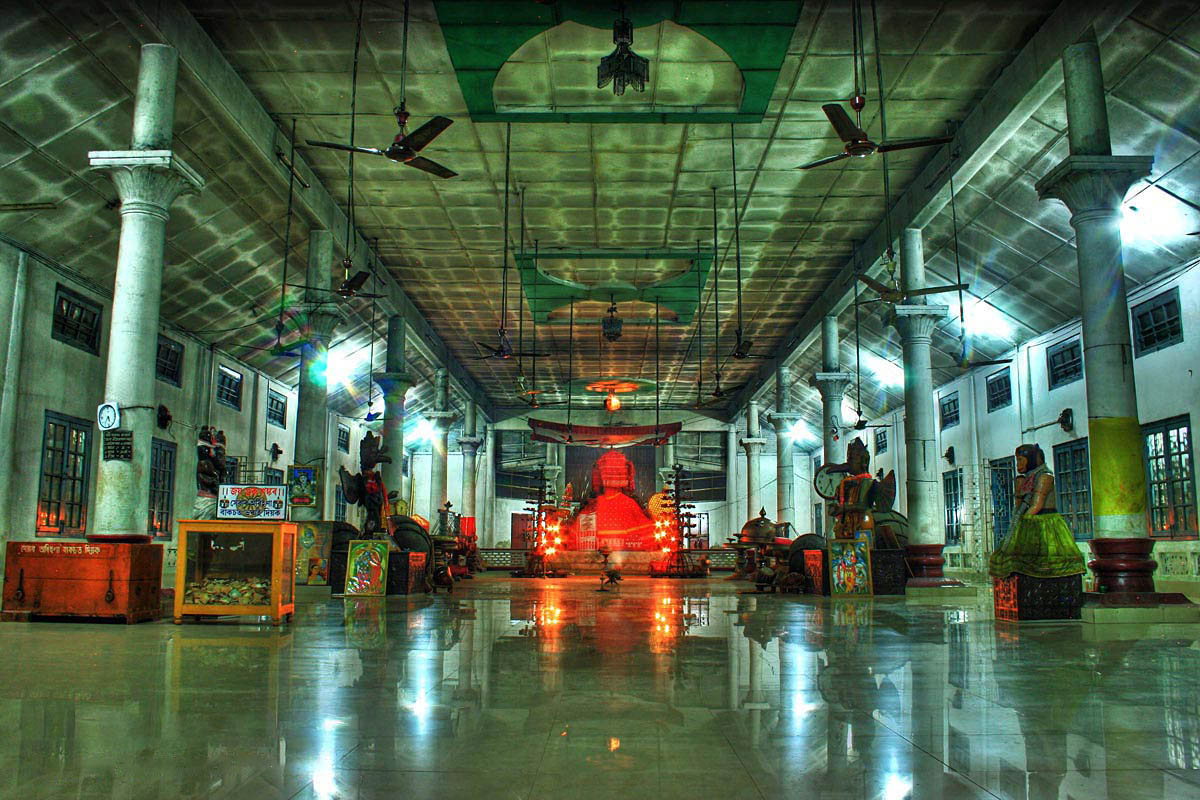
Inside the main temple of Borduwa Than in Nagaon district of Assam

=== New Gatanga ===
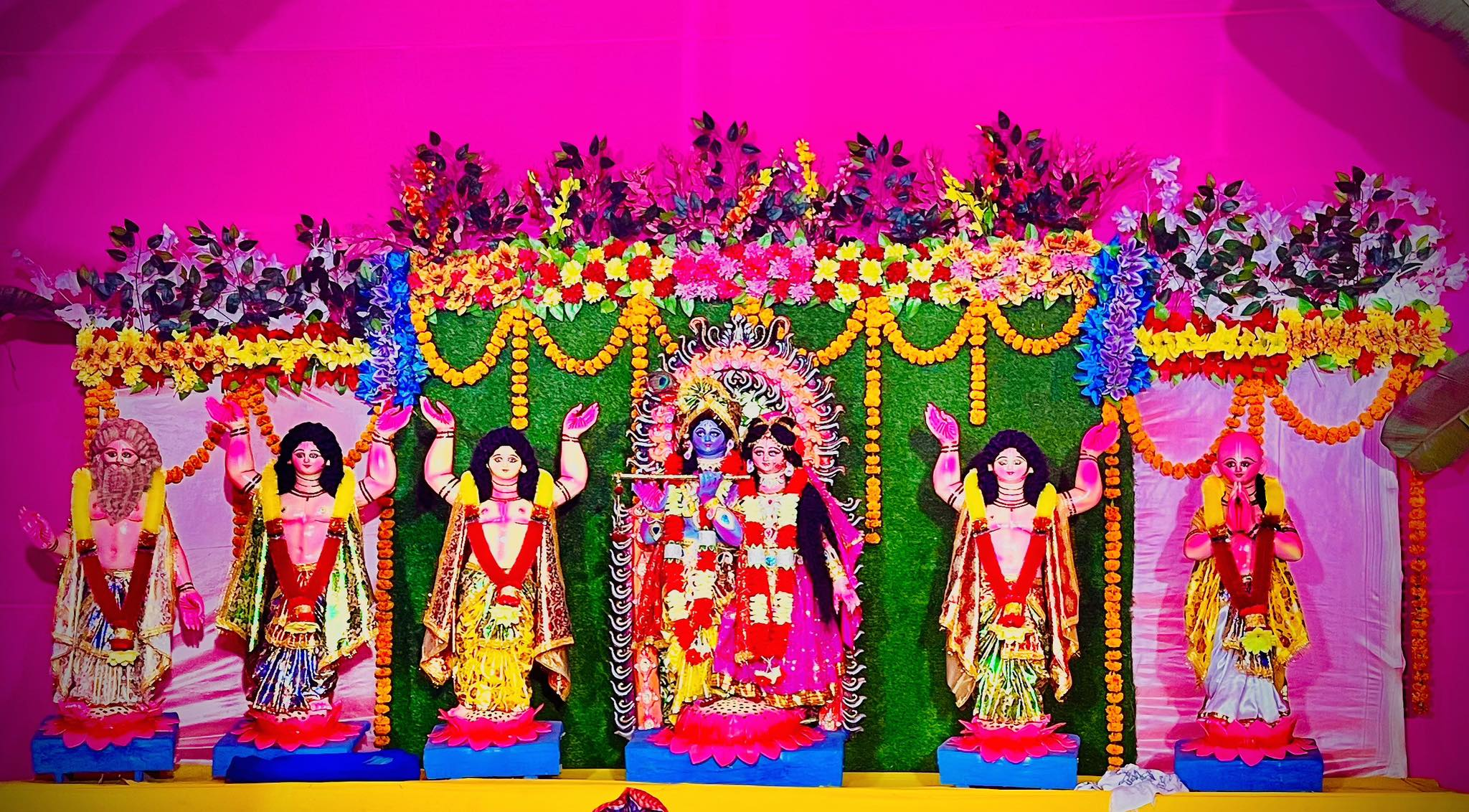
Gatanga Temple Naam Kirtan Festival

New Gatanga is a New Town of Nagaon District. Nagaon Engineering College is located in New Gatanga East Division. New Gatanga Famous for Gatanga Temple Naam Kirtan Festival & Shitala Puja. New Gatanga also have many fisheries like Gatanga Beel, Gatanga Fisheries Point, Gatanga-Kuthani Beel etc. The Kolong River, A tributary of Brahmaputra River flows through in the New Gatanga and in the process divided the into two distinct region: New Gatanga and Chokitup.

=== Champawati Kunda ===
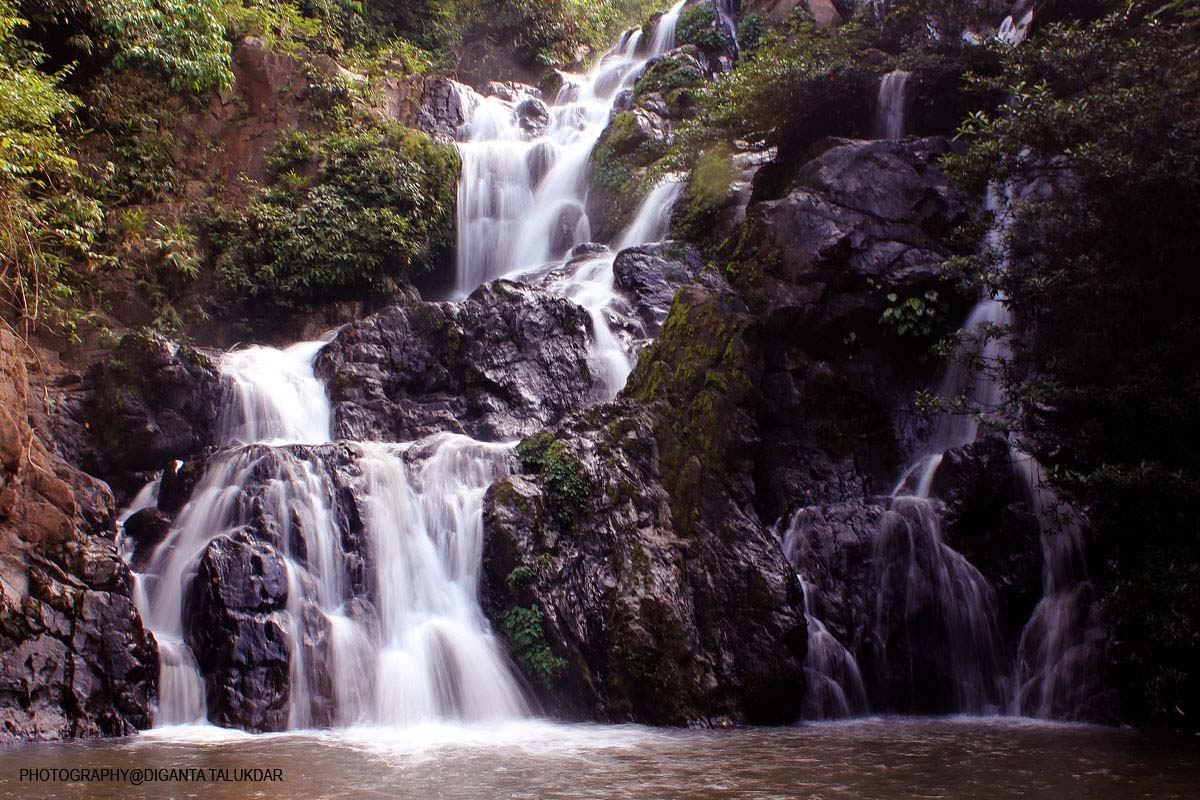
Waterfalls near Chapanala in Nagaon district of Assam

Champawati Kunda is a waterfall situated in Chapanala in Nagaon district.

=== Kaliabor ===
Town that was the headquarters of Borphukans during the Ahom kingdom. It was the scene of several battles against the Mughals.

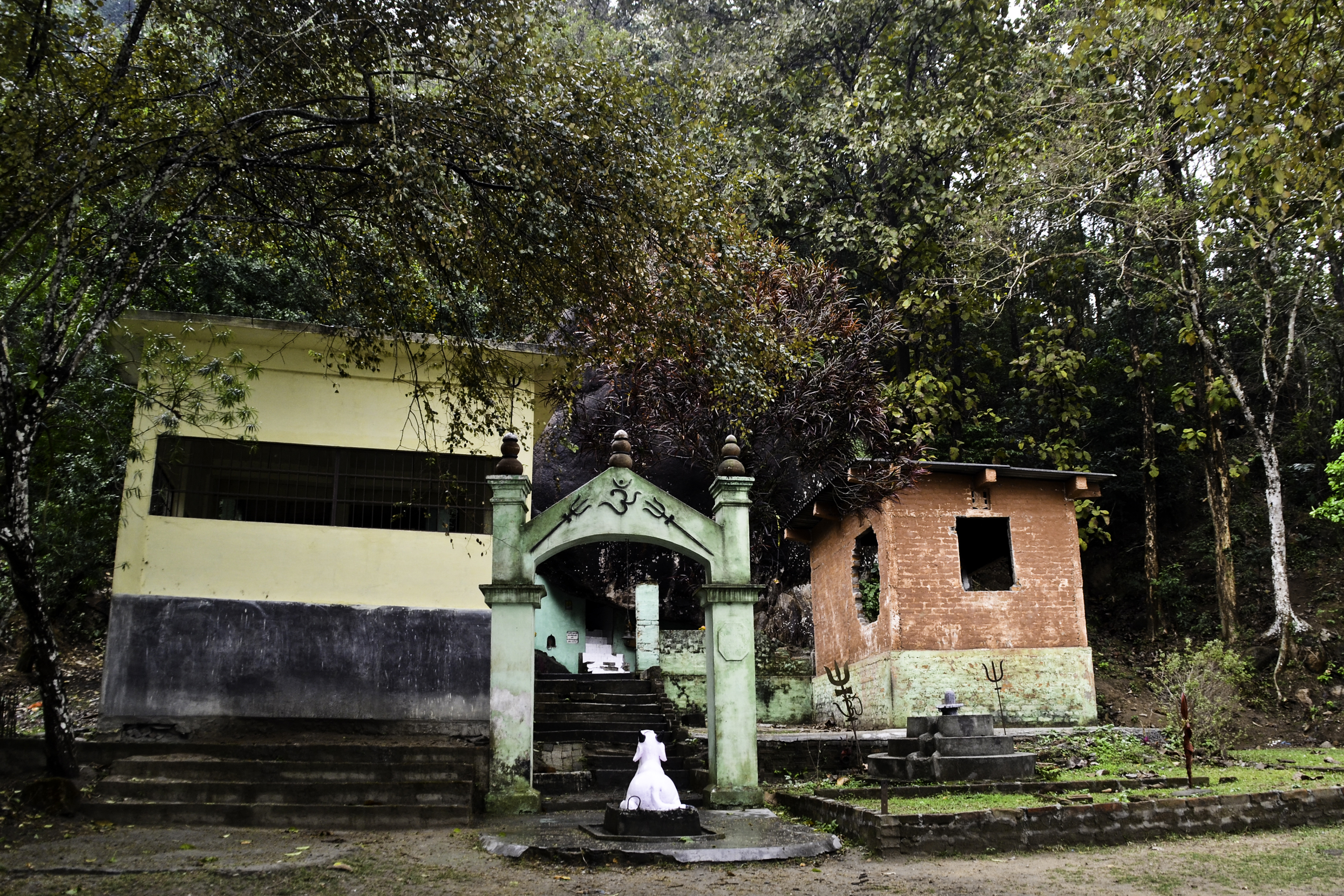
Trishuldhari temple at the bank of Brahmaputra in Silghat

=== Silghat ===
Silghat is a river port lying on the South bank of the Brahmaputra. Pre-communication links of Central Assam across the Brahmaputra traverse this port town. Silghat hosts the Assam Co-operative Jute Mill and several temples.

=== Raha ===
Raha was an important Chowki during the Ahom kingdom. It became a trade centre for agricultural products such as paddy, jute and mustard. The Fishery Training College is there.

=== Kamakhya Temple ===
The Kamakhya Temple is in Silghat. The Ashok Astami Melas held every year nearby. (This is not the Kamakhya Temple in Guwahati.)

=== Phulaguri ===
It is the place where Phulaguri Dhewa happened in the month of October 1861.It is said to be the first Peasants' Movement in the entire north-east India.It happened due to the exploitation on the peasants by the then British Government including exorbitant rate of taxes in various types of agricultural products.Captain Singer, a British officer was killed during the Dhewa & his body was thrown into the Kolong river nearby.

=== Kaziranga National Park ===
In 1974 Kaziranga National Park was established. It has an area of 175 km^{2} (67.6 mi^{2}). It shares the park with Golaghat district. It is also home to the Laokhowa Wildlife Sanctuary. It covers an area of 70.13 km². Its main attraction is the great Indian one-horned rhinoceros. Other animals include tigers, leopards, Asiatic buffalo, wild boar, civet cats, leopard cats and hog deer. Various species of birds and reptiles are also found there.

== Sports ==
Football matches are held in Jubilee Field in Nagaon.
