= Dabaka =

Dabaka Dobokha
- Revenue town
- Location in Assam, India Dabaka (India)
- Coordinates: 26.1155°N 92.8685°E
- Country: India
- State: Assam
- District: Hojai
- Founded by: king Dobok
- Named after: King Dobok

Government
  - Type: Town committee
  - Body: Dabaka Town Committee
- Elevation: 61 m (200 ft)

Population (2001)
  - Total: 11,043

Languages
  - Official language: Assamese
  - Most spoken language: Sylheti
- Time zone: UTC+5:30 (IST)
- Postal code: 782440
- ISO 3166 code: IN-AS
- Vehicle registration: AS
- Nearest city: Hojai
- Sex ratio: 1.08 ♂/♀
- Literacy: 85%

Dabaka (/ˈdʌbəkə/ DUB-ə-kə), also called Doboka or Dobaka (/doʊˈboʊkə, dəˈ-/ doh-BOH-kə, də-), is a town in Hojai district (formerly in Nagaon district) of Assam state in India. It is a commercial place situated in the central part of Assam.

== Demographics ==
As of the 2001 Indian census, Dabaka had a population of 11,043. Males constitute 51% of the population and females 49%. Dabaka has an average literacy rate of 85%, much higher than the national average of 66.5%: male literacy is 88% and, female literacy is 79%. 12% of the population is under 6 years of age. Although its currently promising a center of education in Hojai District.

Assamese is the official languages of this place.

== Location ==
Dabaka is located at an elevation of 61 m above MSL.

Dabaka is connected by National Highway 27 to Nagaon and by National Highway 29 to Dimapur. Its location provides great commercial advantage.

== Culture ==
Dabaka's culture is a blend of traditional festivals, food, music and theatres. The town offers a complex and diverse lifestyle with a variety of food, entertainment and night life, available in a form and abundance comparable to that in other towns of Assam. Doboka's history as a trading centre has led to a diverse range of cultures, religions and cuisines coexisting in the town. This blend of cultures is due to the migration of people from all over Assam since the British period. The majority of the residents are Sylheti -speaking Muslims with a notable number of Hindus which have over numbered the indigenous Assamese communities. Dabaka's residents celebrate both Western and Indian festivals along with indigenous festivals. Diwali, Holi, Eid, Christmas, Navratri, Good Friday, Bihu, Moharram, Durga Puja and Maha Shivratri are some of the festivals held in the town.

== Economy ==
Doboka has been one of the leading town after Hojai town in International Agar Exportation to Middle Eastern countries, Bangkok, Laos, Singapore etc. Dabaka is one of the developed town of Assam and it ranked 10th position in Highest per capita income in Assam.

=== Farming ===
Lower-class families are engaged with farming of mostly rice, wheat and sugarcane.

Though it has very little land for farming, it has produced huge amount of rice production. The natural fertility of the soil behind the foothills accelerate the production of farming.

== See also ==
- Hojai
- Markaz Academy
