= Kamrup Metropolitan district =

- District of Assam
- Guwahati district
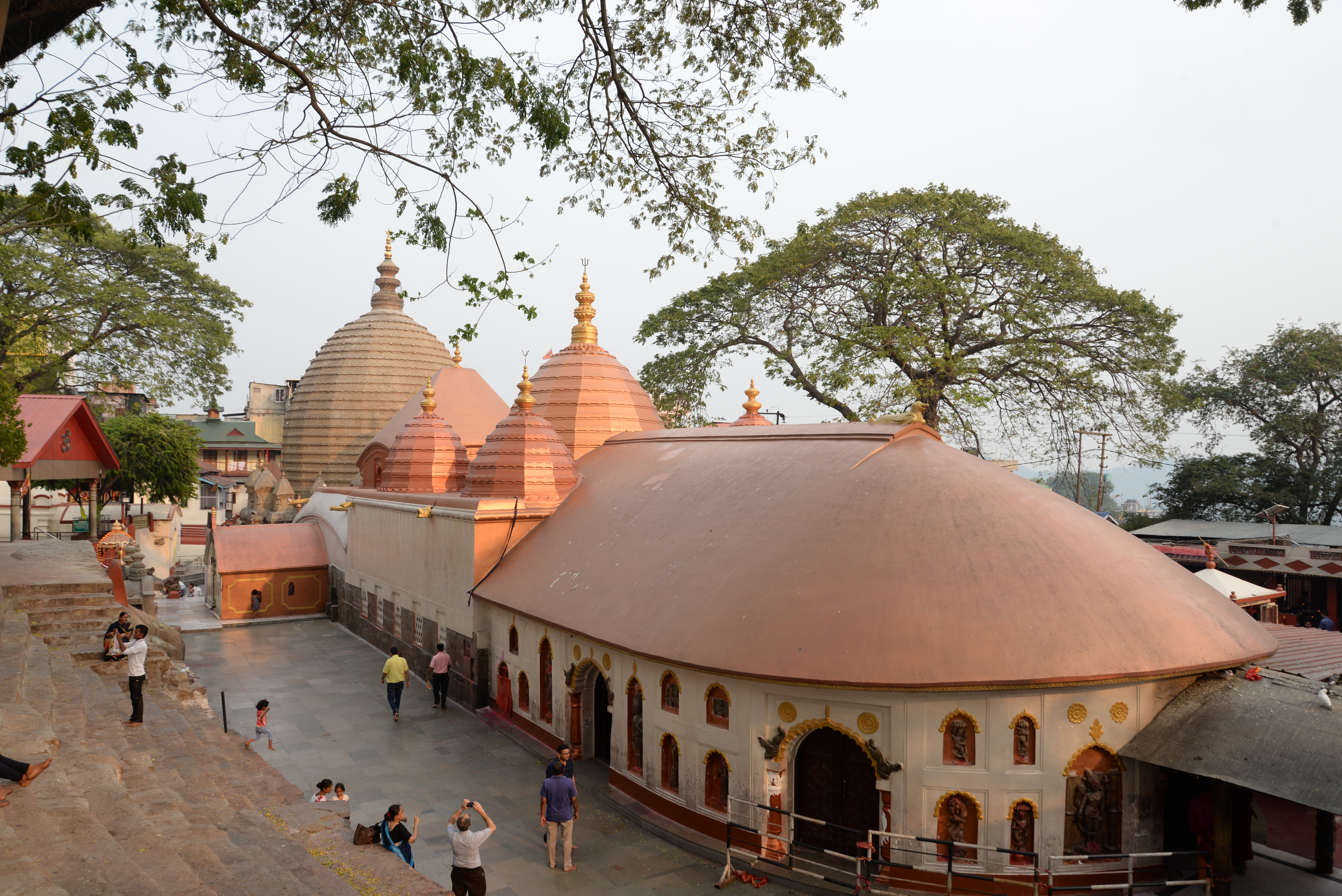
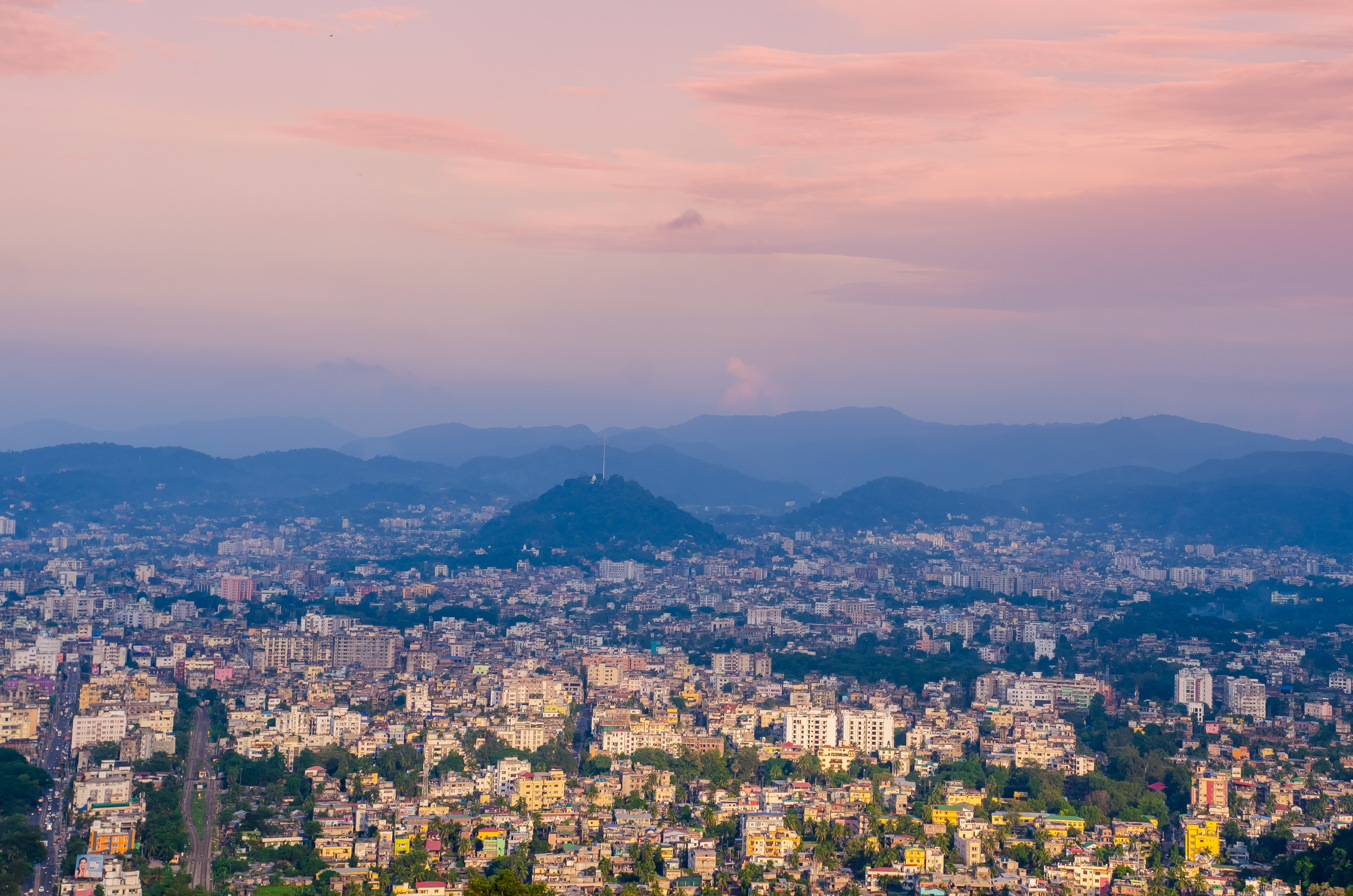
- Top: Kamakhya Temple; Bottom: View of Guwahati from Nilachal Hill
- Interactive map of Kamrup Metropolitan district
- Coordinates: 26°11′0″N 91°44′0″E
- Country: India
- State: Assam
- Division: Central Assam
- Headquarters: Guwahati

Government
  - Lok Sabha constituencies: Gauhati
  - Vidhan Sabha constituencies: Jalukbari, Dispur, Gauhati East, Gauhati West

Area
  - Total: 1,527.84 km^{2} (589.90 sq mi)

Population (2011)
  - Total: 1,253,938
  - Density: 820.726/km^{2} (2,125.67/sq mi)
- Time zone: UTC+05:30 (IST)
- ISO 3166 code: IN-AS
- Website: https://kamrupmetro.assam.gov.in/

Kamrup Metropolitan district is one of the 35 districts in Assam state in north-eastern India. It was carved out of the erstwhile undivided Kamrup district in 2003 and covers an area equivalent to the area under the jurisdiction of the Guwahati Metropolitan Development Authority area. Dispur Legislative Assembly Constituency in Guwahati Metro district with 3.53 lakh voters is the largest constituency in Assam.

== History ==
It was created on 3 February 2003 by bifurcating the erstwhile Kamrup district.

The Government of Assam, during the Chief-ministership of Tarun Gogoi, had proposed to bifurcate it further and create a new district, named East Kamrup. In 2016, the process of creation of the district was started. But later that year, the process of creation was stopped midway due to lack of infrastructure.

== Geography ==
Administrative headquarters of Kamrup Metropolitan district is at Guwahati city. The district occupies an area of 1527.84 km².

=== Climate ===
Climate data for Guwahati
Month	Jan	Feb	Mar	Apr	May	Jun	Jul	Aug	Sep	Oct	Nov	Dec	Year
Record high °C (°F)	30 (86)	33 (91)	38 (100)	40 (104)	38 (100)	40 (104)	37 (99)	37 (99)	37 (99)	35 (95)	32 (90)	28 (82)	40 (104)
Mean daily maximum °C (°F)	23 (73)	25 (77)	30 (86)	31 (88)	31 (88)	31 (88)	32 (90)	32 (90)	31 (88)	30 (86)	27 (81)	24 (75)	29 (84)
Mean daily minimum °C (°F)	10 (50)	12 (54)	15 (59)	20 (68)	22 (72)	25 (77)	25 (77)	25 (77)	24 (75)	21 (70)	16 (61)	11 (52)	19 (66)
Record low °C (°F)	5 (41)	6 (43)	6 (43)	11 (52)	16 (61)	18 (64)	20 (68)	21 (70)	20 (68)	15 (59)	10 (50)	5 (41)	5 (41)
Average precipitation mm (inches)	11.4 (0.45)	12.8 (0.50)	57.7 (2.27)	142.3 (5.60)	248.0 (9.76)	350.1 (13.78)	353.6 (13.92)	269.9 (10.63)	166.2 (6.54)	79.2 (3.12)	19.4 (0.76)	5.1 (0.20)	1,717.7 (67.63)
Source: wunderground.com

== Demographics ==
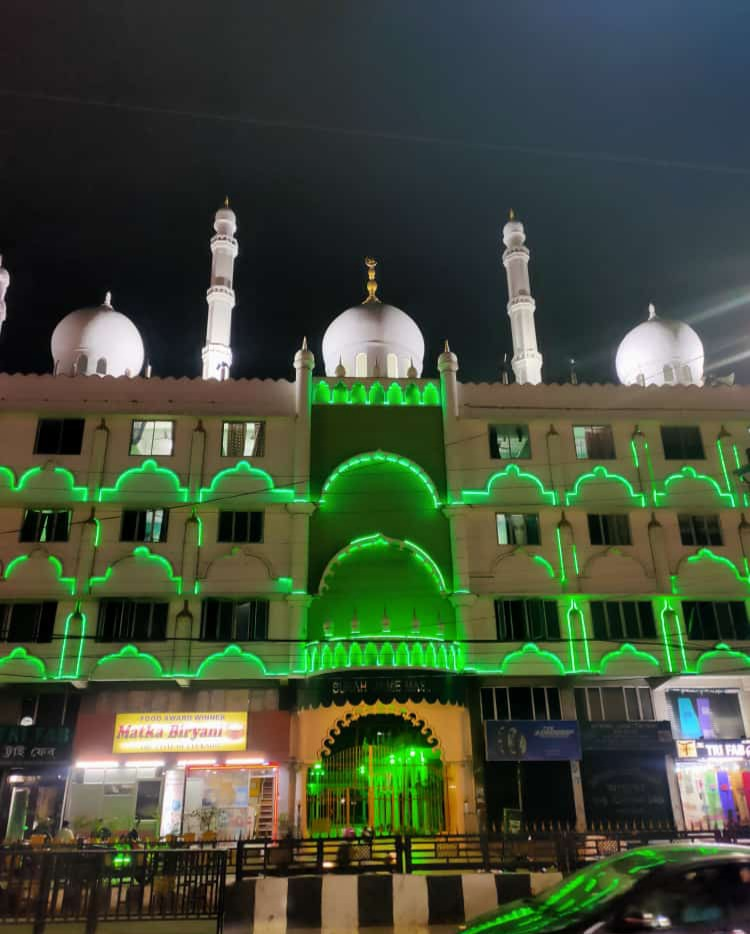
Burah Jame Masjid, one of the largest and most iconics mosques in Kamrup Metropolitan

Historical population
Year	Pop.	±% p.a.
1901	52,351	—
1911	58,160	+1.06%
1921	62,264	+0.68%
1931	68,102	+0.90%
1941	81,183	+1.77%
1951	95,123	+1.60%
1961	216,357	+8.56%
1971	315,404	+3.84%
1991	771,477	+4.57%
2001	1,059,578	+3.22%
2011	1,253,938	+1.70%

=== Population ===
According to the 2011 census Kamrup Metropolitan district has a population of 1,253,938, roughly equal to the nation of Estonia or the US state of New Hampshire.} This gives it a ranking of 384th in India (out of a total of 640). The district has a population density of 2,010 inhabitants per square kilometre (5,200/sq mi). Its population growth rate over the decade 2001-2011 was 18.95%. Kamrup Metropolitan has a sex ratio of 922 females for every 1000 males, and a literacy rate of 88.66%. 82.70% of the population lives in urban areas. Scheduled Castes and Scheduled Tribes make up 8.12% and 5.99% of the population respectively.

=== Religion ===
Religion in Kamrup Metropolitan district (2011)
Religion	Percent
Hinduism	84.89%
Islam	12.05%
Christianity	1.50%
Jainism	0.74%
Other or not stated	0.82%

As of the 2011 census, 84.89% of the population are Hindus, Muslims are 12.05%, Christians are 1.50% and Jains are 0.74% of the population.

=== Language ===
Languages of Kamrup Metropolitan district (2011)
1. Assamese (57.9%)
2. Bengali (20.5%)
3. Hindi (10.4%)
4. Nepali (2.39%)
5. Boro (1.66%)
6. Karbi (1.55%)
7. Others (5.58%)

At the time of the 2011 census, 57.87% of the population spoke Assamese, 20.50% Bengali, 10.45% Hindi, 2.39% Nepali, 1.66% Boro and 1.55% Karbi as their first language.

== See also ==
- Kamrup district
- Nalbari district
- Goalpara district
- Morigaon district
- Jorhat district
