= Islam in Assam =

Islam in the Indian state of Assam

Assamese Muslims
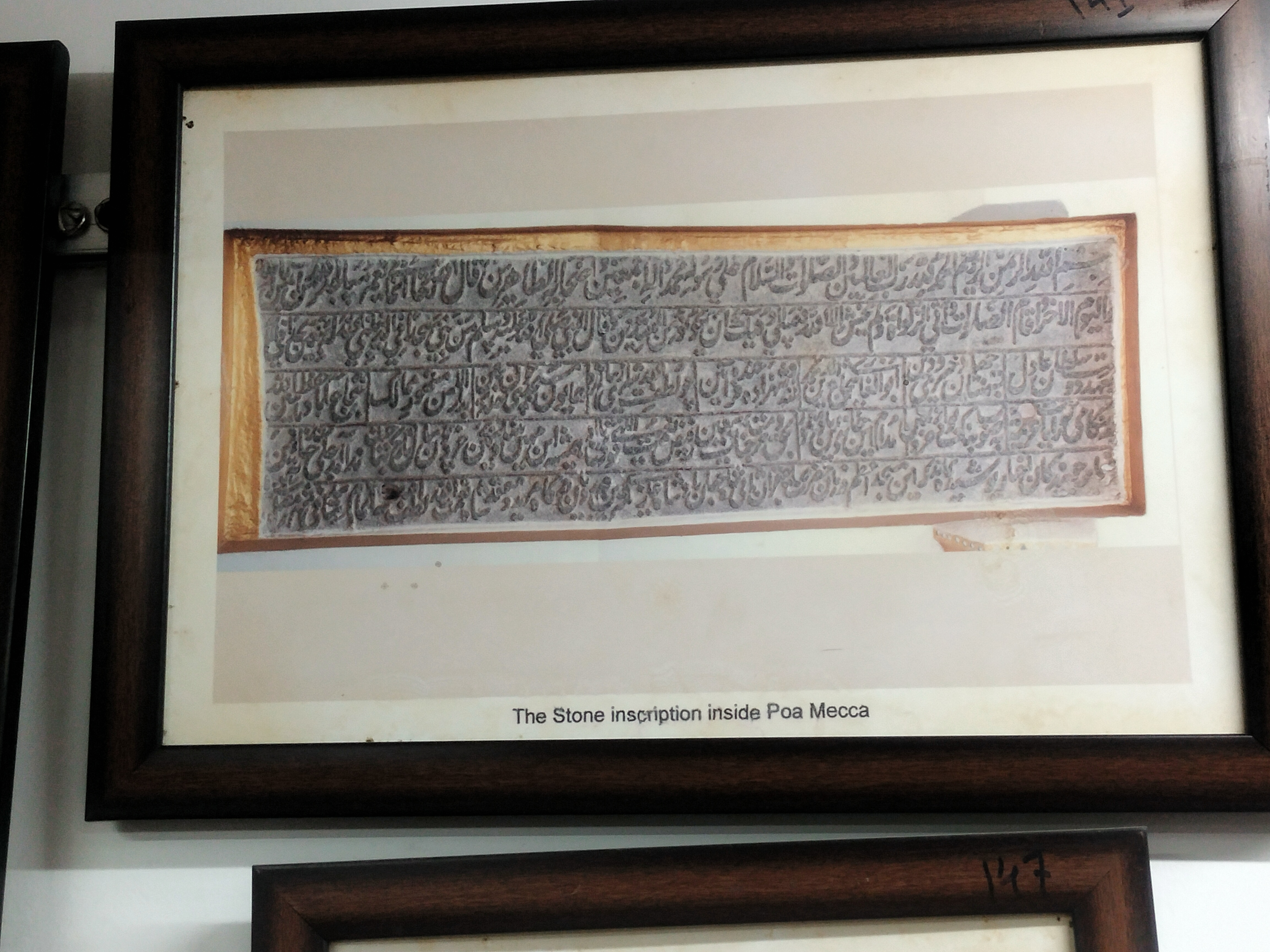
- Stone Inscription inside Poa Mecca, Hajo, Assam.

Total population
- c. 10.68 million (2011 census) (34.22% of the state people) ▲

Regions with significant populations
- Majority -: South Salmara - 95.2%, Dhubri - 79.67%, Goalpara - 57.52%, Bongaigaon - 50.22%, Barpeta - 70.74%, Morigaon - 52.56%, Nagaon - 55.36%, Darrang - 64.34%, Hojai - 53.65%, Hailakandi - 60.31% and Karimganj - 56.36%. Significant -: Cachar - 37.71%, Nalbari - 35.96%, Kokrajhar - 28.44%, Chirang - 22.66% and Kamrup - 39.66%.

Languages
- Majority:- Bengali • Minority:- Assamese, Urdu

Islam is the second largest and fastest-growing religion in Assam. The Muslim population was approximately 10.68 million, constituting over 34.22% of the total population of the state as of the 2011 census, giving Assam, the second-largest Muslim percentage in the country after Jammu and Kashmir (state). After Jammu and Kashmir became Union Territory, Assam became the state with largest Muslim percentage in the country. Islam reached the region in the 13th century and Muslims are a majority in almost eleven districts of Assam and highly concentrated in four districts.

In 2021, estimations have predicted that the Muslim population in the state has reached 40%, numbering 14 million, out of total population of 35 million. Assam Government recognises five groups of indigenous Assamese Muslims were recognised, namely Goria, Moria, Deshi (Koch community), Juluha (Tea Tribals) and Syed other Muslims include various groups, such as Bengali Muslims, Afghani Muslims, Bihari Muslims, Hindustani Musalman and Manipuri Muslims. Some of these groups are affiliated and representatives of multiparty wahabi movements influenced like Nadwatul Ulama, Jamiat Ulema-e-Hind, Tablighi Jamaat and other related parties, while others are non-denominational Muslims.

== History ==
One of the most important factors contributing to the arrival and spread of Islam in Assam in the pre-colonial times was repeated invasions by Muslim rulers and generals. Though none of these invasions succeeded in establishing a rule it created a small but thriving Muslim population, aided by local rulers. Later Ahom kings encouraged a small Muslim immigration and even introduced Islamic prayers in court. In the colonial and post-colonial period, the Muslim population exploded in Assam primarily due to immigration.

=== Early history ===
One of the first conversions in Assam to Islam was Ali Mech, a Mech chieftain. A Delhi Sultanate general Muhammad bin Bakhtiyar Khalji appeared on the borders of Assam in 1206 and converted Ali Mech who guided him on his expedition to capture Tibet. Khalji had arrived with a force of 10–12,000 horsemen at the Kamrup region, but he was defeated at the Chumbi Valley and was forced to retreat back to Bengal with his army annihilated, where he died in the same year. This expedition resulted in Assam's first Muslim population.

The first immigrant settlement occurred in the middle of the 13th century when Malik Ikhtiyaruddin Yuzbak in 1257 occupied some regions of Assam briefly. He introduced khutbah and Friday services. However he was soon defeated by Sandhya, the Rai of Kamarupa, who captured and executed him. In circa 1360, the Sultan of Bengal Sikandar Shah raided the Kamata kingdom and heavily weakened King Indranarayan's authority. However, Sikandar was forced to retreat to Bengal, in order to suppress the invasion of Firuz Shah Tughlaq of Delhi.

=== Sultanate period ===
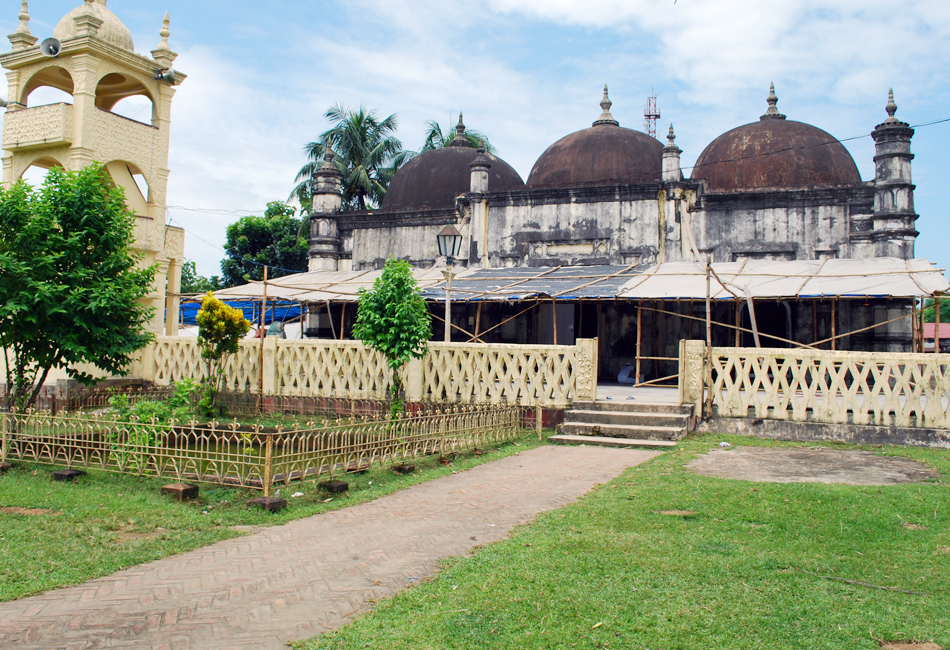
Panbari Mosque, one of the oldest mosque in Assam located at Dhubri

In 1498, Sultan Alauddin Husain Shah dispatched military general Shah Ismail Ghazi with 24,000 soldiers and a flotilla to conquer Kamata. The conquest was instigated by Sachipatra, a Brahmin whose son was executed by Nilambar for his promiscuity with the queen. Successfully imprisoning King Nilambar of the Khen dynasty, the Bengal Sultanate began issuing coins bearing the Sultan as the "Conqueror of Kamru and Kamta" and publicly inscribed the victory at a stone in Malda. The Sultan appointed his son, Prince Daniyal, as the governor of the newly conquered region; that reached up to Hajo and intended to expand to Central Assam. Ghiasuddin Aulia was a Sufi from Baghdad who arrived after the conquest of Kamata kingdom by Alauddin Husain Shah. He established a khanqah atop the Garurachala Hills in Hajo. Claiming to have brought a lump of soil from Makkah with him, the building came to be known as the Barmaqam Powa-Makkah. Ghiyathuddin died and a mazar (mausoleum) was built there.

A Baro-Bhuyan confederation led by Gandharva Rai's descendant Harup Narayan was successful in removing the Sultanate influence, but the Baro-Bhuyans themselves were removed by Vishwa Singha who established the Koch dynasty in 1515. The Sultanate rule lasted for about 15 years.

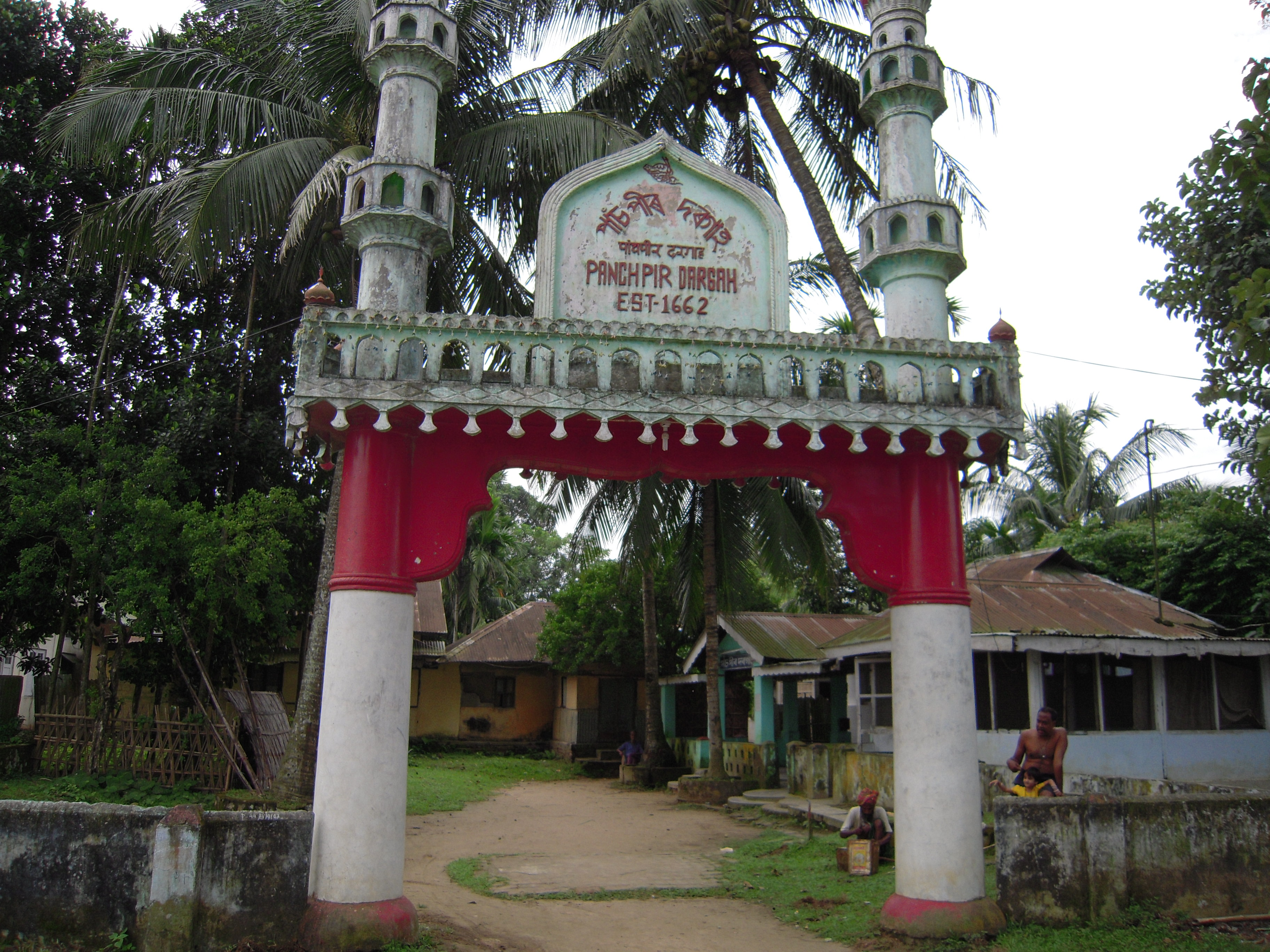
The dargah housing the Panch Pir collective, a group of five mystics that had joined Ram Singh I in the Mughal invasion of Assam.

=== Mughal period ===
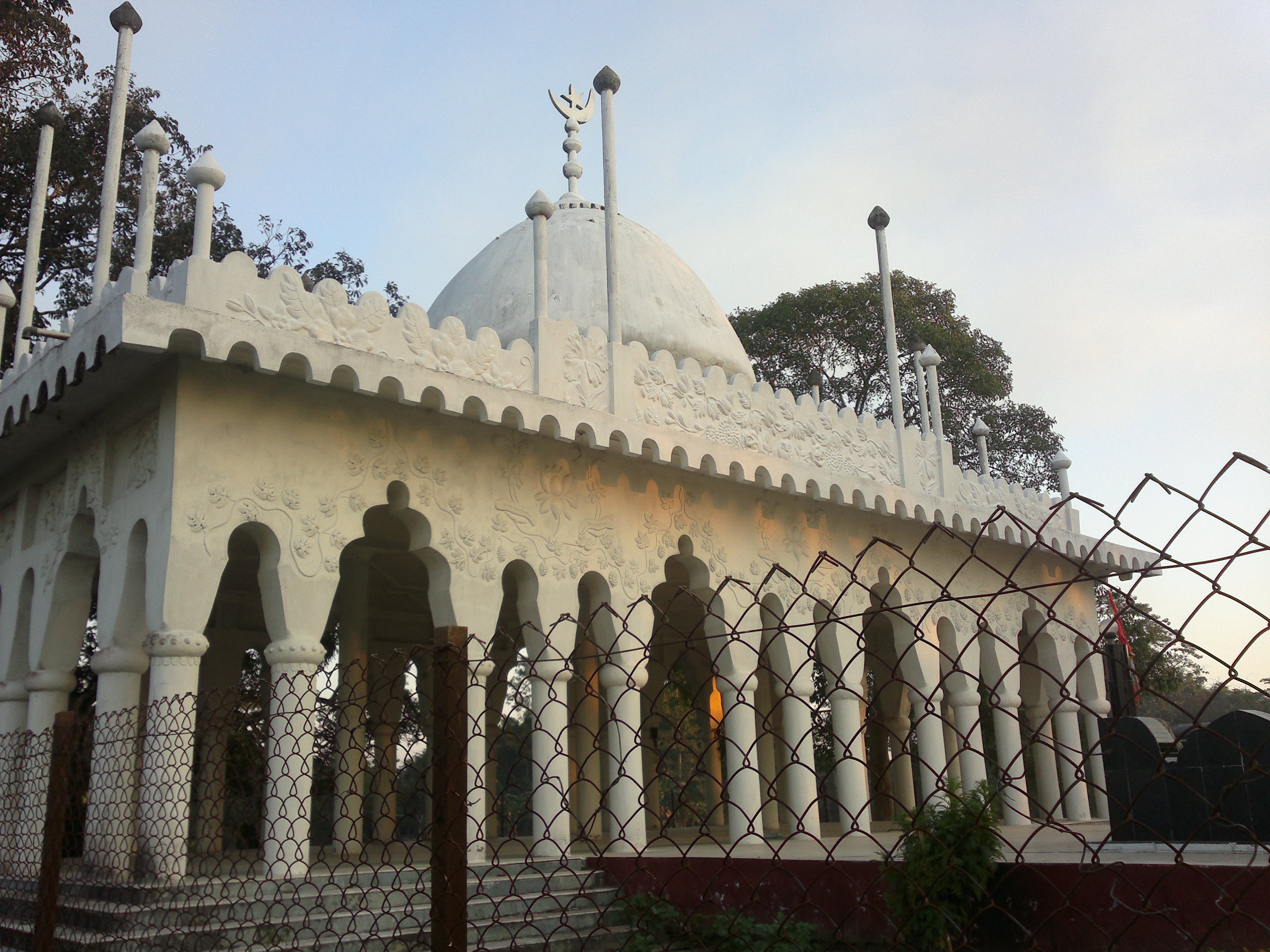
The dargah of Azan Faqir, a Sufi saint who helped spread Islam in the region.

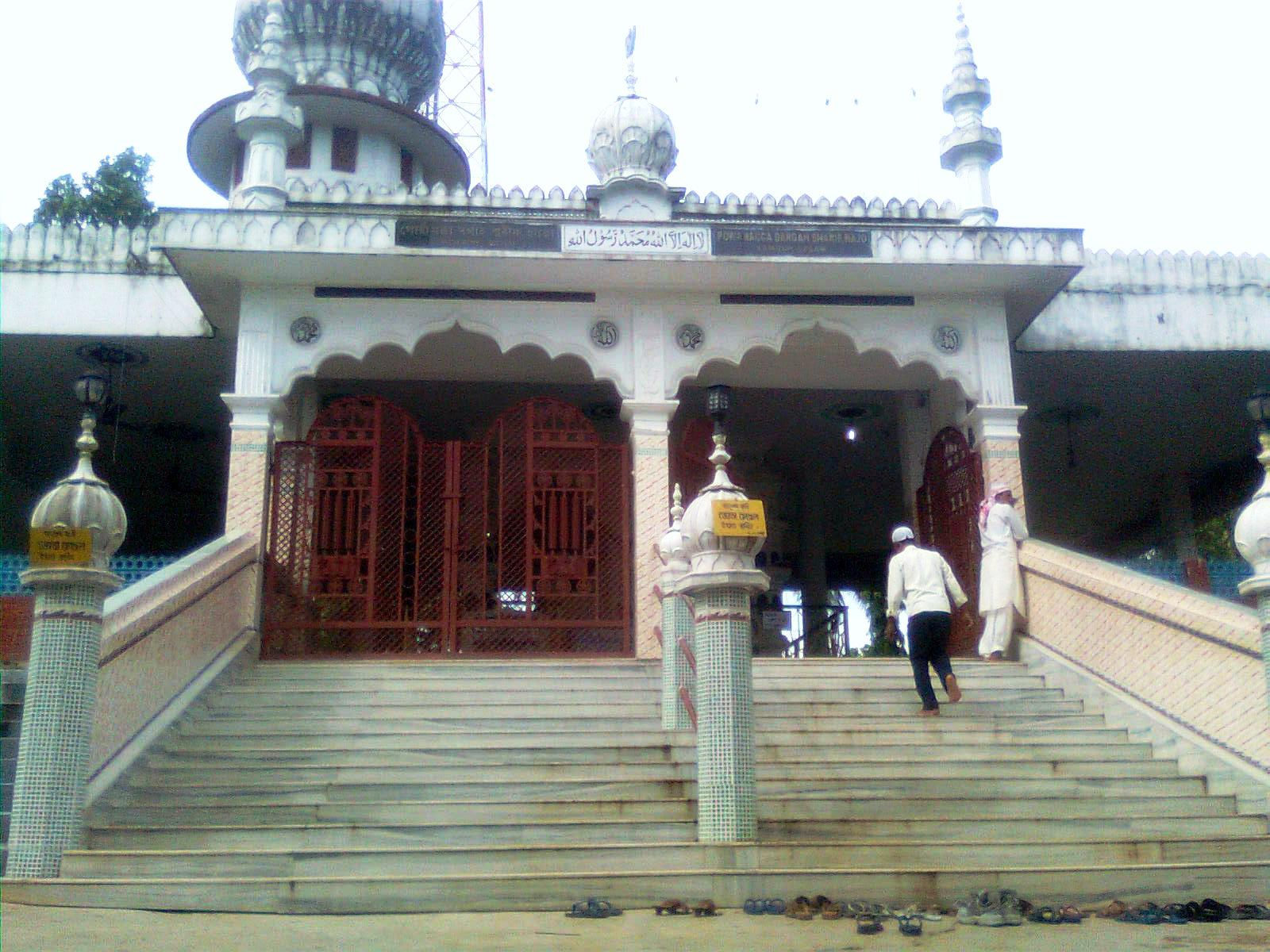
Even after the state-sponsored expulsion of Mughals in 1682, King Sukhrungphaa of the Tungkhungia dynasty was said to have continued to pay great attention to the Powa-Makkah Mosque in Hajo.

In 1613, the Mughal emperor Jahangir appointed Muhammad Zaman Karori of Tehran as the Amil of Sylhet. Zaman took part in Islam Khan I's Assam expedition and was instrumental to the capture of Koch Hajo. The Mughals also ruled Goalpara (as a part of their Bengal Subah), but could not subdue the other parts of Assam. The Mughals established four sarkars in the newly acquired land---among which were Dhekeri (between Sankosh and Manas) and Kamrup (between Manas and Barnadi). Kamrup was also renamed as Shujabad, after Shah Shuja, the Subahdar of Bengal.

In 1630, a Muslim saint from Baghdad popularly known as Azan Faqir settled in Sivasagar. He preached to the local population about Islam and as a result, many converted and became his disciples. His mausoleum is present in Saraguri Chapori.

There were a number of Muslim rulers of Kamrup during this period and they were referred to as the Faujdars of Shujabad. The sixth faujdar, Lutfullah Shirazi, built a hilltop mosque in Koch Hajo in 1657. The mosque contained the mazar (mausoleum) of Prince Ghiyath ad-Din Awliya of Iraq, who is commonly credited for introducing Islam to the region. The Mughals lost Kamrup forever in 1682 after the Battle of Itakhuli. Incomplete list of Faujdars of Guahati:

1. Makram Khan (1612-1614)
2. Mir Sufi (1614-1616)
3. Shaykh Kamal (1616-1632)
4. Abd as-Salam (1632-1638)
5. Noorullah Khan Herati (1638-1656)
6. Lutfullah Shirazi (1656-1658), built a hilltop mosque in Hajo in 1657.

=== British Raj ===
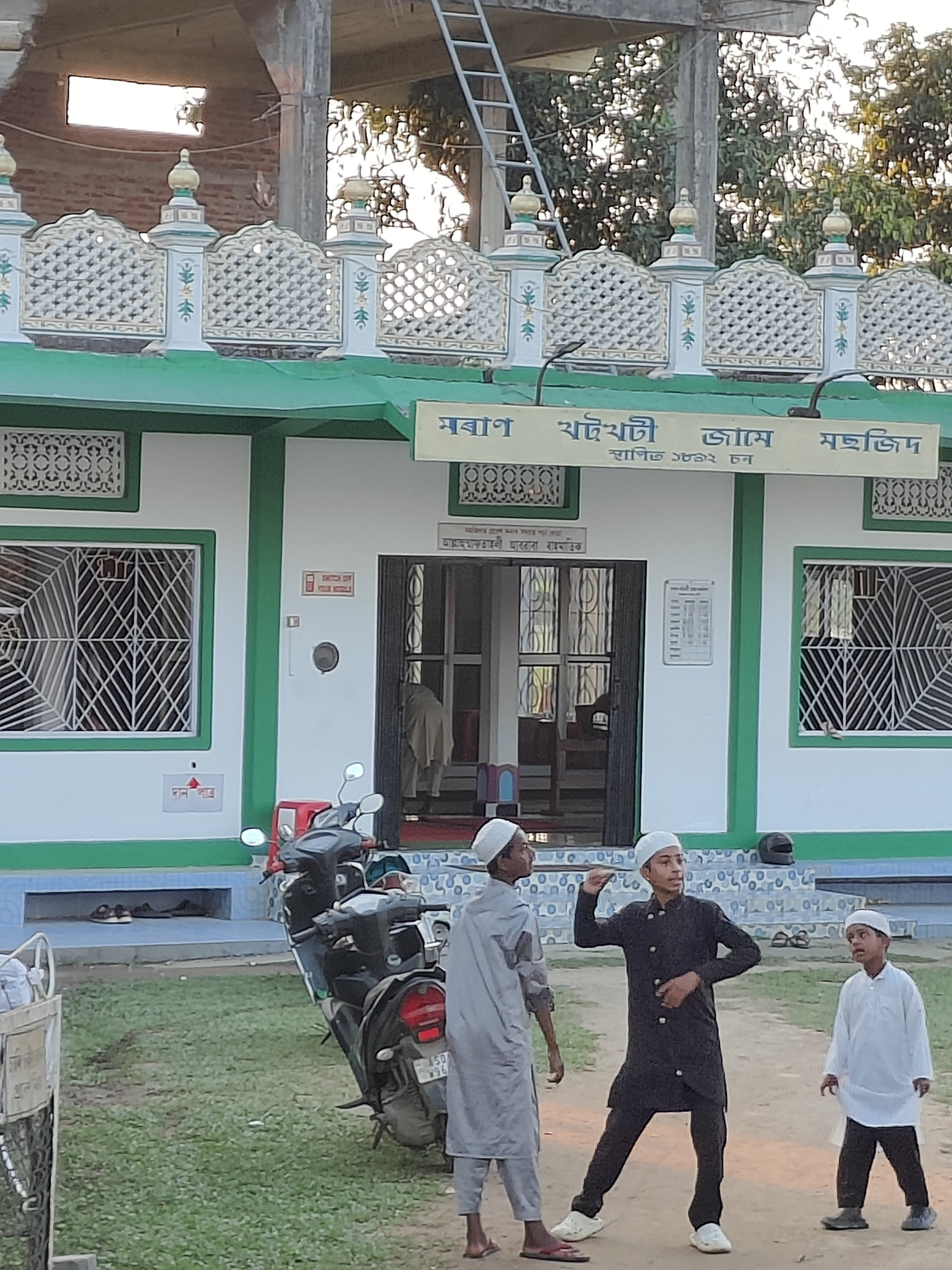
Muslim children playing outside the Moran Khatkhati Jame Mosque (est. 1892)

When Assam came under colonial rule, the British brought with them a number of immigrant Bengali settlers (mostly Bengali Muslims from Eastern Bengal region, now Bangladesh). These immigrants encouraged other Bengalis to settle in Assam for economic and social reasons. The fertile land of Assam and its vast expanse was inhabited by indigenous populace at that time( that is, vast lands and forests were present but fewer people) which then attracted a large number of landless immigrant peasants from Bengal presidency, nearly 85% of whom were Muslims. The tea planters and immigrant Marwari businessmen, who needed workers, also welcomed the migrants.

Early establishments of these immigrant Bengalis were in the Goalpara district, mostly in the char (riverine) lands and reserved forests. Most of these Muslim immigrants were known as "Miyas". Since many of them came from the Northeast part of Rangpur and very few of them came from Mymensingh, they were sometimes referred to as Bongal meaning Outsider.

After the Government of India Act 1935, a Legislative Assembly was established in Assam in 1937. The Muslim League, led by Muhammed Saadulah, formed a minority government in the state and he again encouraged large scale immigration from then Bengal.

In World War II, Nawab Sahidur Rahman of Azad Hind was the only Assamese martyr of Azad Hind Fauj during Burma Campaign.

=== Independence ===
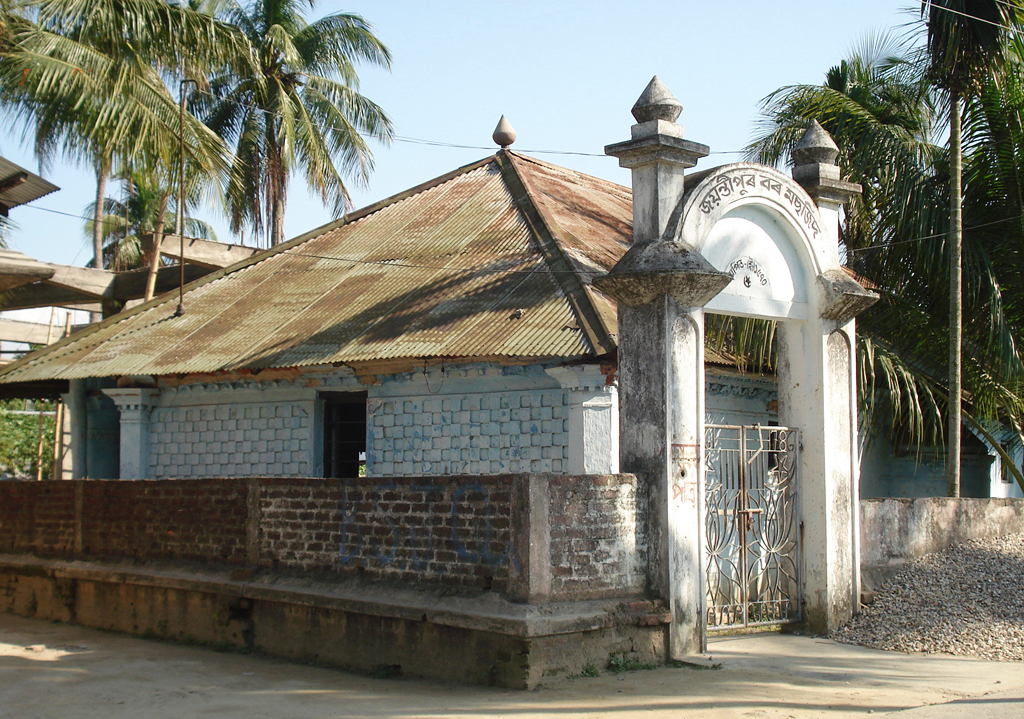
The Jayantipur Bor Mosque near Kuwarital was constructed in 1570.

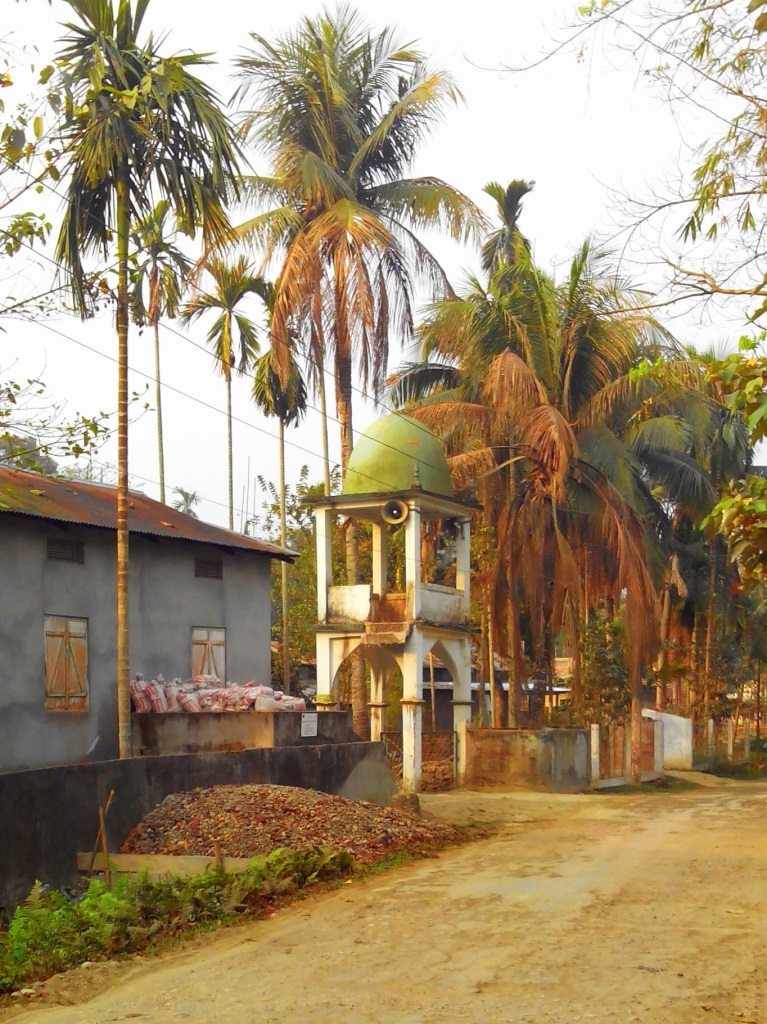
The Chanmaguri Mosque near Rangiya, Kamrup.

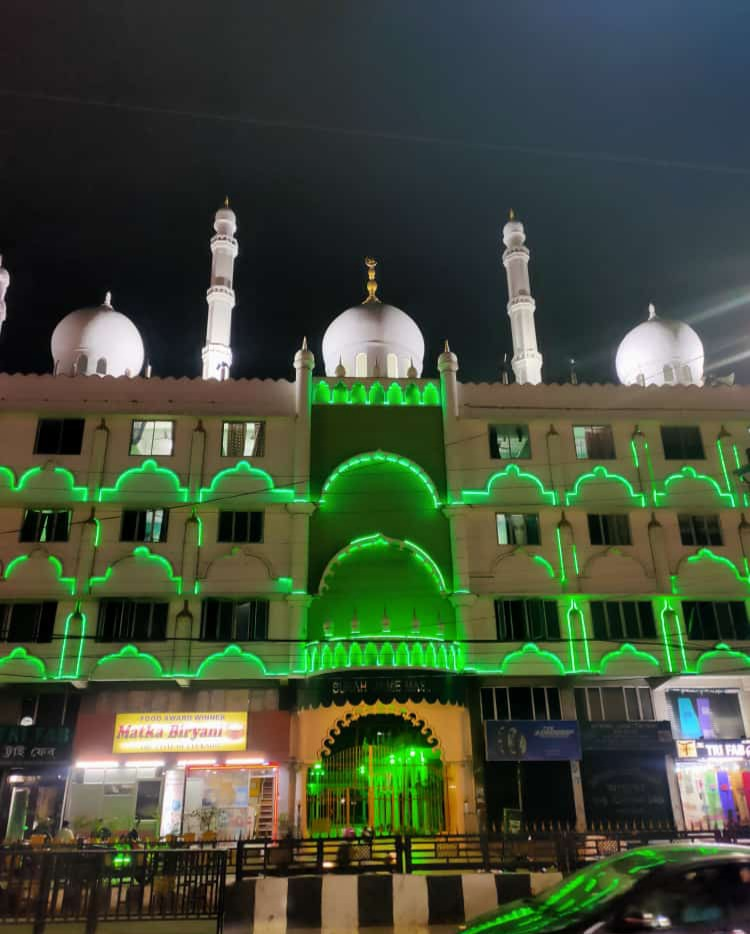
Burah Jame Masjid, one of the largest and most iconics mosques in Guwahati

After the Sylhet referendum in 1947, the Muslim-majority Sylhet region went to East Pakistan while some Muslim-majority areas such as the Karimganj district went to Assam, India.

Assam has some indigenous Muslims like the Gauria, Maria and Deshi, though they are very few as compared to the large-scale Bengal-originating immigrants. Thus, there have been concerns that illegal immigration from neighbouring East Pakistan in India has contributed to a sharp rise in the Muslim population of Assam and has slowly destabilised the native inhabitants of Assam. This fear of "demographic invasion" by East Pakistani has been a political issue in Assam since the days of the Assam Movement (1979–1985). In 2001, there were 6 Muslim-majority districts in the state of Assam. By 2011, this number had increased to 9. However, some have stated these numbers have declined in recent years, though there is no concrete proof.

==== Assam Movement and accord ====
The Assam Movement or the Assam Agitation (1979-1985) led by All Assam Students Union (AASU) and the 'All Assam Gana Sangram Parishad' (AAGSP) was a popular uprising to drive out the illegal immigrants from Bengal/Bihar etc. The movement ended with the signing of the Assam Accord by leaders of AASU-AAGSP and the Government of India under PM Rajiv Gandhi. During this period of six long years of the historic movement, reportedly, 855 people (later on 860 according to AASU reports) sacrificed their lives in the hope of an "infiltration free Assam" in the 1979-1985 Assam agitation. In addition, the infamous Nellie and Khoirabari massacres took place during this time claiming the lives of 2,191 and 100-500 respectively.

== Demographics ==
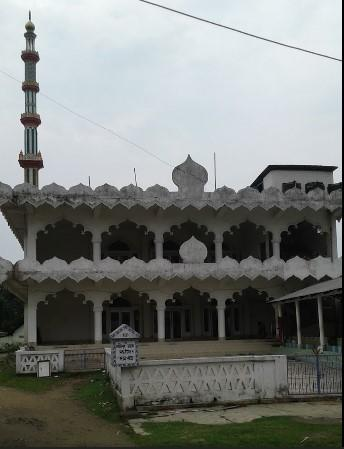
Largest and oldest mosque in North Lakhimpur.

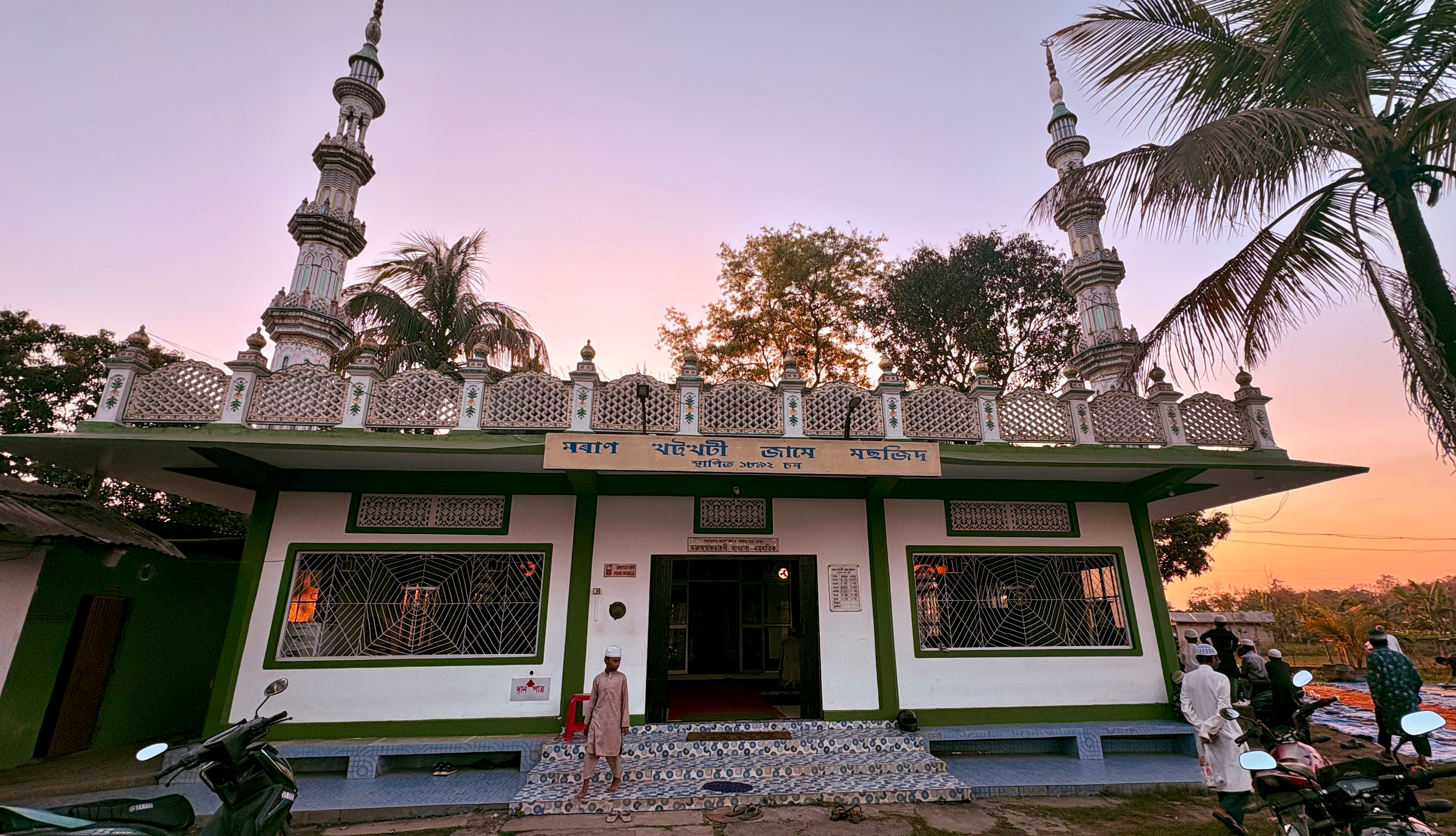
Moran Khatkhati Jame Mosque (1892) in Charaideo district.

Decadal presence of Muslims in Assam
Year	Pop.	±%
1901	303,170	—
1911	634,101	+109.2%
1921	880,426	+38.8%
1931	1,279,388	+45.3%
1941	1,696,978	+32.6%
1951	1,995,936	+17.6%
1961	2,765,509	+38.6%
1971	3,594,006	+30.0%
1981	4,722,467	+31.4%
1991	6,373,204	+35.0%
2001	8,240,611	+29.3%
2011	10,679,345	+29.6%
2021	14,012,874	+31.2%
Source: Census of India

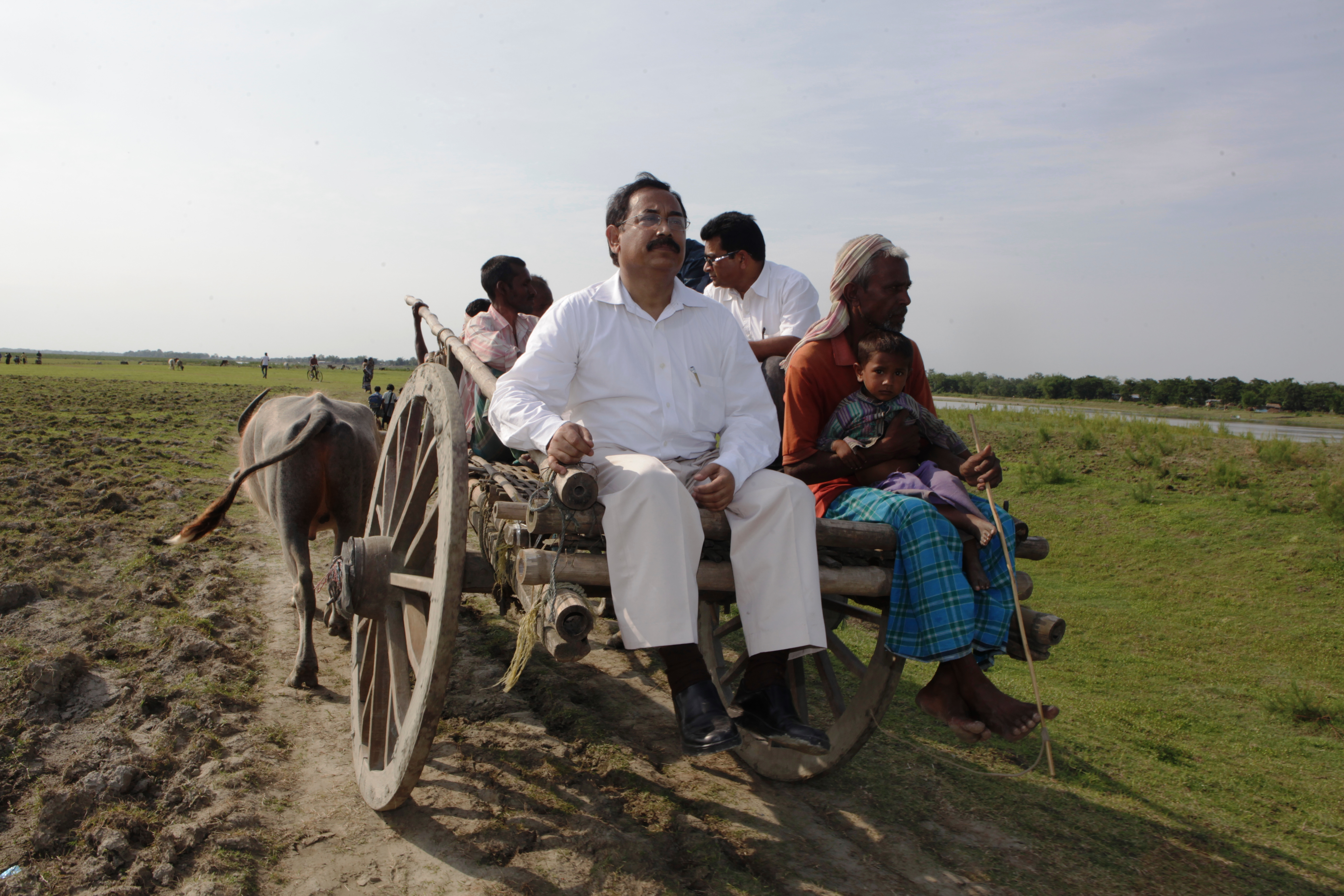
Ilias Ali on a journey to propagate family planning among the riverine people of Rural Kamrup.

Assamese is the official language of the state and the most widely spoken, and so it serves as a lingua franca for inter-ethnic communications. Bengali, which is an official language in Assam's Barak Valley, is also a popular common language among certain communities.

The Assamese Muslims are often divided into four subgroups; Deshi, Maria, Gauria and Syeds. Some of these people are descendants of defeated Mughal soldiers, captured in Ahom–Mughal conflicts, who eventually married native Assamese women and adopted Assamese language and culture. Their population totals to roughly 4 million, comprising 12.8% of state population. The Syeds claim to be descendants of the Islamic prophet Muhammad.

The Deshi are descendants of indigenous converts to Islam from the Koch, Mech, Rabha, Boro. They consider Ali Mech, the 13th-century chief, as their founding father. This group mainly converses in Goalpariya and Rajbanshi, as opposed to Boro and Rabha. They are mainly found in the western districts of Goalpara, Kokrajhar, Dhubri and South Salmara-Mankachar (i.e. Lower Assam).

The Maria are descended from captured Muslim soldiers who were part of Bakhtiyar Khalji's army in 1206. They are named as such because they were engaged in the bell-metal and smithy industry, the word Maria meaning one who hits metals. On the other hand, the Gauria are descendants of Muslim soldiers who accompanied Turbak Khan during his conquest of Assam in 1532. This army hailed from Gaur in Bengal, so are referred to as Gauria. The Mariya and Gauria are minority groups and can be found in Sivasagar, Jorhat, Tinsukia, Golaghat, Kamrup and some other districts in Assam. They speak Assamese language as their own mother tongue.

The Muslim of Barak Valley adapt Sylheti language for speak consists of 3 districts namely Cachar, Karimganj, Hailakandi. Karimganj was known as a sub division of Sylhet district before 1947 which also part of Akhand Bharat or Ancient India. However, the Radcliffe Boundary Commission separated Karimganj from Sylhet. In Past, the district of Hailakandi and Cachar were under Twipra Kingdom and subsequently under Koch Kingdom from 16th-18th century A.D, followed by Kachari Kingdom from 18th-19th century A D. The Sylheti Muslims are living and controlling local governancy were there before the Kacharis. There were no natural boundaries between Karimganj and Cachar to happen.The inhabitant Muslims in Barak Valley (comprising districts of Cachar, Hailakandi and Karimganj) bear surnames at present (starting from British era but not before) like Khan, Choudhury (adopted by most everyone's), Mazumdar, Laskar (used by most landlords), Barlaskar (mix of barbhuiya and Laskar), Barbhuiya (used by most of landlords), Mazarbhuiya (associate with Barbhuiyas), Talukdar, and Hazari and other regular titles or Surnames mostly bought from Kachari kings Krishan Chandra and Govinda Chandra but some not use any surnames or titles. Besides them, Manipuri, Mizo Muslims are also believed to have settled in Barak Valley. So they can be said to have technically existed in Assam even before the Ahoms.

The Bengali-speaking Miya people are descended of Muslim from the modern-day Bangladeshi and Assamese Muslim descendent at divisions of Mymensingh, Rangpur and Rajshahi. They are concentrated in the central and lower Assam districts such as Dhubri, Morigaon, Goalpara, Kamrup, Darrang, Nagaon, Bongaigaon, Barpeta, South Salmara district, Nalbari, Chirang and Bodoland region. Their population is around 10.49 million, comprising about 30% of the state population, out of 40% of the Assam's total Muslim population as of 2021 year estimation report.

The third group are the descendants of Muslim migrants from Hindi belt various parts of North-West- Central-Southe India, who speak Hindustani. Their population is about 1.25 lakhs in Assam, comprising 0.4% of state population as of 2011. They are mainly found in Brahmaputra Valley.

=== Education ===
According to the 2011 Census of India, Muslims in Assam had a literacy rate of 53.84%, which was lower than the overall literacy rate of the state's population aged seven years and above. The graduate and above population among Muslims stood at 2.24% of the Muslim population.

Educational level of Muslims in Assam (Population age 7 and above), Census of India 2011
Education	Assam	Muslims	
Education	Pop.	Popul.	(%)
Illiterate	12,626,630	4,929,191	46.16%
Literate	22,733,246	5,750,154	53.84%
Graduate and above	1,444,393	239,305	2.24%
Total population	35,359,876	10,679,345	100%

== Population ==
Percentage and population of Islamic religion followers in Assam by decades
Year	Percentage (%)	Muslim Population	Total population
1901	9.22%	303,170	3,289,680
1911	16.48%	634,101	3,848,617
1921	18.99%	880,426	4,636,980
1931	23.01%	1,279,388	5,560,371
1941	25.35%	1,696,978	6,694,790
1951	24.86%	1,995,936	8,028,856
1961	25.52%	2,765,509	10,837,329
1971	24.57%	3,594,006	14,625,152
1981	26.18%	4,722,467	18,041,248
1991	28.43%	6,373,204	22,414,322
2001	30.92%	8,240,611	26,655,528
2011	34.22%	10,679,345	31,205,576

Source: (Census of India) 1901-2011

• Variation for two decades (1971–1991). In 1981, census was not conducted in Assam due to disturbed conditions resulting from insurgency. Muslims in Assam have recorded the most dramatic decline in fertility since NFHS-3, which was conducted 14 years earlier. The number of children who would be born per woman — or the total fertility rate (TFR) — of the Muslim community in Assam is at 2.4 which is higher than the 1.6 for Hindus as of 2019-20 research by the fifth National Family Health Survey. The reduction in fertility among Muslims has been from 3.6 in 2005–06 to 2.4 in 2019–20, a drop of 1.3 compared to 0.4 among Hindus in the same period, although from a lower base. Muslim percentage have increased from 9.22% in 1901 to 34.22% in 2011 (which is a sharp rise of 21.82% for past 120 years). In 2021, some estimates have placed Assam's Muslim population at about 14 million, out of 35 million total population, thus making up 40% of the state population.

=== Population by district (2011 year) ===
Below is a breakdown of the Muslim population by district in the Indian state of Assam according to the 2011 Census of India: Muslims are majority in eleven districts out of thirty-three in Assam. Muslims are majority in Dhubri, Bongaigaon, Goalpara, Barpeta, Morigaon, South Salmara district, Hojai, Nagaon, Darrang, Karimganj and Hailakandi. Highest concentration in Cachar, Nalbari, Kamrup, Kokrajhar and Chirang.

District	Total population	Muslim population	Percentage
Baksa	950,075	135,750	14.29%
Barpeta	1,693,622	1,198,036	70.74%
Bongaigaon	738,804	371,033	50.22%
Cachar	1,736,617	654,816	37.71%
Chirang	482,162	109,248	22.66%
Darrang	928,500	597,392	64.34%
Dhemaji	686,133	13,475	1.96%
Dhubri	1,949,258	1,553,023	79.67%
Dibrugarh	1,326,335	64,526	4.86%
Dima Hasao	214,102	4,358	2.04%
Goalpara	1,008,183	579,929	57.52%
Golaghat	1,066,888	90,312	8.46%
Hailakandi	659,296	397,653	60.31%
Jorhat	1,092,256	54,684	5.01%
Kamrup	1,517,542	601,784	39.66%
Kamrup Metropolitan	1,253,938	151,071	12.05%
Karbi Anglong	956,313	20,290	2.12%
Karimganj	1,228,686	692,489	57.36%
Kokrajhar	887,142	252,271	28.44%
Lakhimpur	1,042,137	193,476	19.57%
Morigaon	957,423	503,257	52.56%
Nagaon	2,823,768	1,563,203	55.36%
Nalbari	771,639	277,488	35.96%
Sivasagar	1,151,050	95,553	9.30%
Sonitpur	1,924,110	350,536	17.22%
Tinsukia	1,327,929	48,373	3.64%
Udalguri	831,668	105,319	12.66%
Hojai	931,218	499,565	53.65%
South Salmara district	249,508	244,590	98.03%
Majuli district	167,304	592	0.35%
Assam (Total)	31,205,576	10,679,345	34.22%

=== Population by Tribes ===
Muslim population in Assam by Tribes (2011)
Tribe Name	Muslims
All Schedule Tribes	13,188
Chakma	743
Dimasa, Kachari	126
Garo	532
Hajong	0
Hmar	281
Khasi, Jaintia, Synteng, Pnar, War, Bhoi, Lyngngam	512
Any Kuki Tribes including	115
Lakher	0
Man Tai speaking tribes	110
Any Mizo (Lushai) tribes	10
Karbi	1,109
Any Naga tribes	753
Pawi	0
Others and Generic Tribes	4,676

== Indigenous Muslims ==
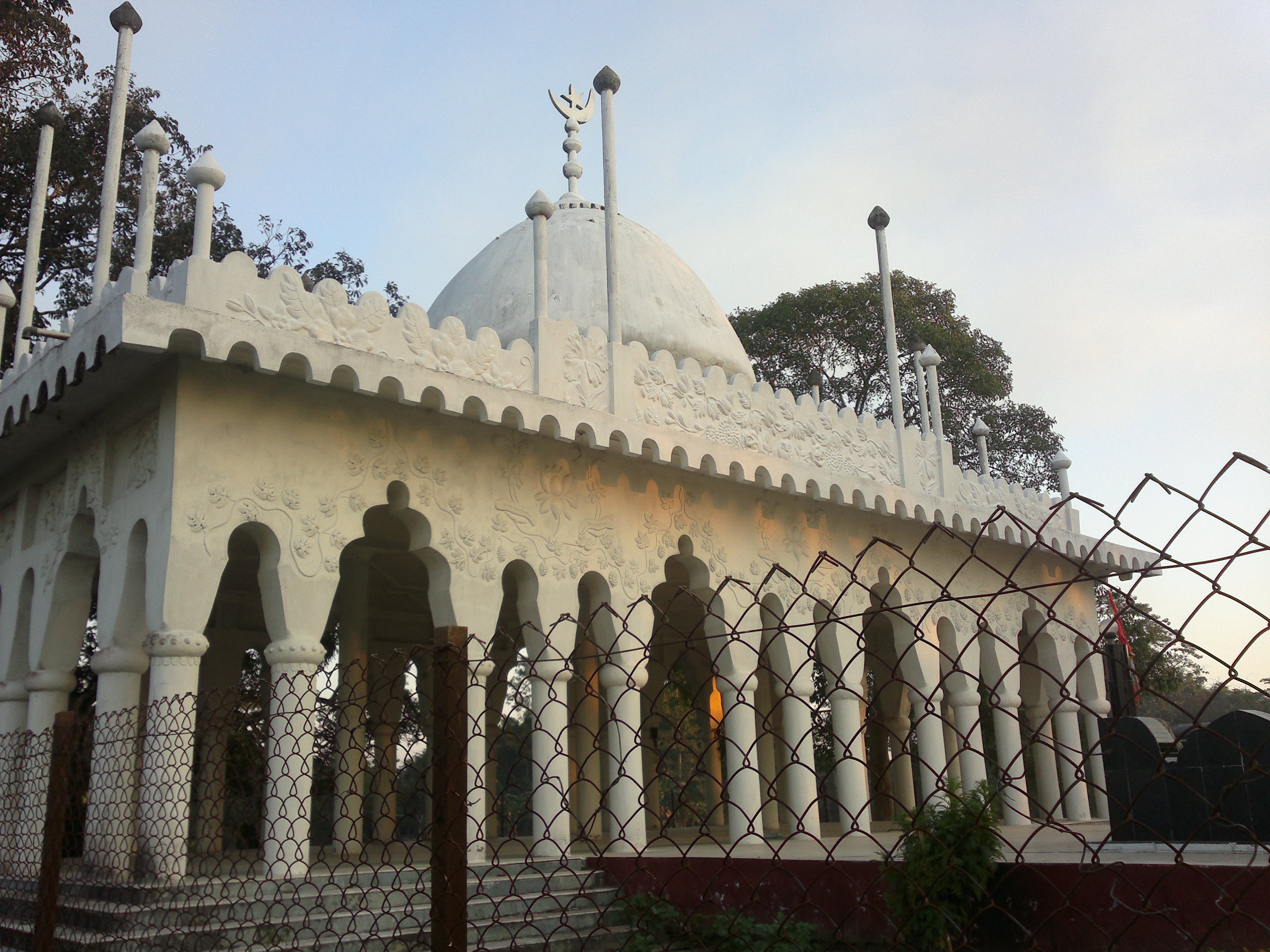
Sacred mausoleum of Azan Faqir at Sivasagar, he was an important historical figure in the formation of the indigenous Assamese Muslim community.

Assamese Muslim community is composed of two main groups:

- Muslim-Axamia:

The Muslim-Axamia community represents a significant indigenous Muslim population in Assam. Known by various names such as Goriya People, Tholua, or Khilonjia, they have been an integral part of Assam's cultural landscape for centuries. Their distinct identity adds to the intricate tapestry of Assamese culture.

The lineage of Deshi's (Desi Community), believed to be among the first batch of people in Assam to have embraced Islam, is traced back to Ali Mech, a Koch-Rajbongshi.

- Juluha Muslims:

The Julhas (also called Jolha or Jolaha) are a small Assamese Muslim community found in some parts of Upper Assam. The Julhas were originally from undivided Bihar, Odisha, and West Bengal and are believed to be converts from Adivasis. There were two phases of migration of the community to Assam. First, during the time of the Ahom kings, who brought them to work as weavers; and the other towards the end of the 19th century, when a large number of Julhas were brought by British tea planters to work in the tea gardens.

In the 1891 Census Report, Julhas were described as Muslim weavers. According to the Report, there were 2180 Julhas in Assam, of which 624 were in Cachar, 558 in Sylhet, and 252 in Sivasagar. The descendants of these migrants now form the Julha community and can be found in certain localities of Eastern Assam. For example, the Julha community formed during the Ahom rule can be seen in Moran, Nazira, and Dimow areas of Sivasagar. Those brought by the British have a small concentration in Balibat, near Dergaon (Jorhat district), and Misamura in Golaghat District. In Assam, they are listed as More Other Backward Classes (MOBC) and part of the tea-garden community. Most of the customs of the Julhas are similar to the Tea Tribe community of Assam. Jhumur, the traditional dance of the Tea Tribe Community, is also popular among the Julhas. The dialect they speak too is similar to the one used by the Tea Tribe Community.

On 5 June 2022, by cabinet decision of the Assam Government, five groups of indigenous Assamese Muslims were recognised, namely Goria, Moria, Deshi, Jalah (Juluha) and Syed. On 3 October 2023, the Assam Government announced its intention to conduct a survey aimed at assessing the socio-economic status of indigenous Muslims in Assam. Some observers considered this an attempt to differentiate between the Bengali-speaking 'Miya' Muslims and the state's native Muslim population. The AIUDF Party spokesperson accused the BJP of employing a 'divide and rule' strategy in Assam, emphasising their alleged focus on creating divisions within the Muslim population by exploiting differences between indigenous and non-indigenous groups for political gains. The exact population or proportion of indigenous Assamese Muslims within the overall Muslim population of Assam is currently not conclusively known, as official census data has historically not distinguished between different Muslim groups based on indigenous status. On 5 June 2025, Assam Chief Minister Himanta Biswa Sarma stated that a caste census would help identify and document Assam's indigenous Muslim communities. He said the exercise would be incorporated into the 2027 census of India.

== Miya Marginalisation ==
Bengali-speaking Muslims, also known as Miya people, who initially migrated from Northeast and East Bengal during the British Raj, hold significant numerical influence, determining the outcomes of approximately 30 assembly seats out of Assam's 126 constituencies. They in Assam have faced repeated and increased attacks. In 1983, around 3000 Bengali Muslims were killed in the Nellie massacre, (unofficial figures run at more than 10,000).

During the 2012 Assam violence there was communal riot between Bengali-origin Muslims and the indigenous Bodo people. Almost 80 people were killed, most of whom were Bengali Muslims and some Bodos. Nearly, 400,000 people were displaced to migrant camps, most being Muslims. Indian nationalist politicians have accused Bangladesh of trying to expand its territory by ostensibly promoting illegal immigration. However, Indian government census reports note a decline in immigration from Bangladesh between 1971 and 2011.

In Baksa, from the night of 1 May 2014 until the early morning hours of 3 May a series of attacks occurred on Bengali Muslims in Assam. The perpetrator is unknown, but is suspected to be the National Democratic Front of Bodoland's Songbijit faction. Speculated to be revenge for not voting for the National Democratic Front in the Lok Sabha elections, the death toll reached 32, mostly Muslims.

On 7 June 2019, 82 families comprising more than 1,000 people — all Muslims — were evicted from the Rajanikhal forest village under the Haiwaithang range. On 10 June 2021, nearly 100 families of about 500 Bengali-speaking Muslims were rendered homeless through land eviction, leaving them with no option but to take shelter near a road. A similar drive was also carried out on 17 May at Jamugurihat in North Assam's Sonitpur district which have evicted 25 Muslim families, all belonging to the Bengali speaking groups. The district administration officials said they had illegally occupied government land and did not vacate it despite several warnings in the past.

Many Bengali-speaking Muslims in Assam claim the NRC directly declared them under D voter category. Citing the statistics, the letter alleged that the numbers suggest there was pressure from State authorities to declare more persons as foreigners as far as possible. Between 1985 and 2016, out of 468,934 referrals, 80,194 Bengali speaking Muslims were declared as foreigners. In 2017, 13,434 persons from the same community were declared foreigners. Assam last NRC which was conducted on 2019 year, have found that 1.9 million people names were out of the list, of which nearly around 5 lakhs Bengali speaking Muslims names were excluded.

On 21 September 2021, the government of Assam evicted around 5,000 Bengali-speaking Muslims in Darrang district and the claimed reason for their eviction was that they had allegedly illegally encroached upon government lands. It has been also reported that two mosques and a Madrassa were also demolished during the drive, however, no evidence had been shown for the allegations. As per as media report, two Muslims (including a kid) were shot to death by the police firing.

On first week of January 2023, Eviction Drive were again carried out by Assam government in Lakhimpur district, where around 300 Bengali Muslim Families homes and occupation were destroyed permanently, thus making them homeless and jobless.

In August 2024, after a rape case in Dihing by where convicts were from Miya Community, various organisations, including the All Tai Ahom Students Union (ATASU), Asomiya Yuva Manch, Bir Lachit Sena, Garia Maria Desi Jatiya Parishad (representing Indigenous Assamese Muslims), and others, issued an ultimatum for the "Miya" people to leave Upper Assam. Assam CM Himanta Biswa Sarma sparked controversy by stating in the Assembly that he wouldn't be able to maintain law and order if people from Lower Assam moved to Upper Assam against the wishes of the indigenous population, highlighting ethnic tensions rather than religious ones. On 3 September 2024, approximately 28 Miya Muslims were placed in a detention camp in Assam.

In July 2025, approximately 1,400 Bengali Muslims were forcibly evicted in Dhubai.

== Illegal immigration ==
Census of India between (2001-2011) have shown that Bengali Muslim population grows 15-17% in Assam specially in the bordering districts over the past decade. In February 2020, the Assam Minority Development Board announced plans to segregate illegal Bengali Muslim immigrants from the indigenous Muslims of the state, though some have expressed problems in identifying an indigenous Muslim person. According to the board, there are 1.4 crore (14 million) Muslims in the state, of which 10 million are of Bengali origin, and rest are Indian origin indigenous Assamese. Allegedly that the number of 'illegal Bangladeshis' in Assam of all religions is about 1 crore (10 million) and are scattered across the length and breadth of the state. A report reveals that out of total 33 districts in Assam, Bangladeshis dominate almost 15 districts of Assam. Several people reveal that Bangladeshi roumers made them specially Muslims victimised of "D" voters. This is even more problematic when names have been left out even after included on draft NRC by providing proper legacy papers.

== Notable Muslims from Assam ==
- Fakhruddin Ali Ahmed, first Muslim President of India from Assam
- Hafiz Ahmed writer
- Mofida Ahmed, Assam's first women MP (elected From Jorhat (Lok Sabha constituency), 1957)
- Badruddin Ajmal, MP from Dhubri Lok Sabha constituency, CEO of Ajmal Foundation; founder of the Assam United Democratic Front (AUDF)
- Ayesha Hazarika, journalist
- Bagh Hazarika, Assamese Muslim warrior served in Ahom Kingdom
- Elvis Ali Hazarika, swimmer
- Mafizuddin Ahmed Hazarika, writer
- Adil Hussain, actor
- Rakibul Hussain, Deputy Leader of the Opposition Assam Legislative Assembly
- Wasbir Hussain, journalist
- Baharul Islam, Justice of the Supreme Court of India
- Syed Abdul Malik, writer
- Abdul Matlib Mazumdar, Indian freedom fighter and political leader based in undivided Assam State. An opponent of the partition of India
- Ali Mech, considered the first Muslim convert of Assam
- Abu Nechim, the first Muslim IPL cricketer from Assam
- Muhammed Saadulah, first Prime Minister of Assam, the only Assamese Muslim member of the drafting committee of the constituent assembly of India
- Imran Shah, writer
- Parween Sultana, Padma Bhushan vocalist
- Anwara Taimur, the only woman chief minister of Assam (She was the first Muslim woman Chief Minister of any state in India).
- Zerifa Wahid, actress

== See also ==
- Islam in West Bengal
- Christianity in Assam
- Hinduism in Assam
