= Nashya Shaikh people =

Nashya Shaikh
Regions with significant populations
- India (West Bengal, Assam, Bihar) Bangladesh

Languages
- Native: Rajbanshi, Kamtapuri/Rangpuri, Goalpariya, Surjapuri; Second language: Bengali, Assamese, Nepali, Hindustani, Bihari languages

Religion
- Islam

Related ethnic groups
- Surjapuri, Koch, Rabha, Boro, Deshis

The Nashya Shaikh or Nashya Sekh is a Muslim community found in northern parts of the state of West Bengal in India. They are culturally and linguistically similar to both people of northern Bangladesh and Goalpara of Assam. A small number of the community are also found in the neighboring state of Bihar, where they are known as the Bengali Shaikh. The group is descended from a set of tribals which were collectively referred to as Koches, who converted to Islam as they were unable to find a favourable position in Hindu society and came to be known as the Rajbanshi Muslims. They are homogeneous with the Koch people and are bilingual, speaking both Bengali and Surjapuri.

== Origin ==
The Nashyas trace their origin to the indigenous communities of Koch people of northern West Bengal, though some of them are also from Mech community. Their conversion to Islam is said to have taken over two to three centuries, and the Nashya still retain many cultural traits of their pre-Islamic past.For instance the reverence of pirs was a continuation of their previous beliefs. Most people of the community are non-practicing Muslims though the newer generations are becoming increasing Islamic due to globalization. From historic evidence, it seems a segment of the population of northern Bengal began to convert to Islam when the region fell under the control of Bakhtiyar Khilji. Some of the earliest converts were the chiefs Ali Mech and Kala Pahar. Tradition also ascribes the conversion of several lineages to Sufi saints such as Torsa Pir, Pagla Pir, Shah Fakir Sahib and Shah Gari Sahib.

== Present circumstances ==
At the time of the 1891 census in Cooch Behar, the Nasya Sheikh were the predominant Muslims in the state with a population of 1,69,551 while other immigrant Muslim communities were only 1,195. They made up 29.29% of Cooch Behar's population at the time.

Politically the community has remained supportive of the establishment - whether the Raja of Cooch Behar, the Congress during Partition, or the Left Front and Trinamool Congress during their time in power.

The Nashya were once substantial landowners, generally known as jotedars. Below this class was a substantial strata of medium-sized peasants. With the independence of India in 1947, the larger estates were divided. The community's contribution to the agriculture of northern West Bengal is substantial, with the Nashya growing jute, tobacco, and rice.

The Nashya as a community were once strictly endogamous but their marriage with mainstream Bengali Muslims brought them more close to Bengali culture. Their physical appearance seems more similar to other Bengalis than to Rajbongshi people. They are divided into lineages such as Bepari, Pramanik, Sarcar and Sekh. Each of these lineage groups intermarry. The community is mainly follows hanafi school of Sunni Islam. They are concentrated in the districts of Cooch Behar, Jalpaiguri, Darjeeling, and Dinajpur (north and south). They are also found in the neighbouring Purnia Division of Behar, where they are known as Bengali Shaikh.

The community have set up their own political and cultural organization, the Uttar Bango Angrassar Muslim Sangram Samiti, which acts as a pressure group for the community.

== Notable people ==
- Maziruddin Ahmed (born 1898), Cooch Behar politician
- Abbasuddin Ahmed (1901–1959), musician
- Hossain Mohammad Ershad (1930–2019), President of Bangladesh
- Mustafa Kamal Abbasi (1933–2015), 9th Chief Justice of Bangladesh
- Mustafa Zaman Abbasi (born 1936), musicologist
- Fazle Haque (born 1937), former state minister of West Bengal
- Ferdausi Rahman (born 1941), singer
- Mozammel Hossain Lalu (1942–2014), member of the Bangladesh parliament
- Merina Rahman (born 1943), member of the Bangladesh parliament
- Ghulam Mohammad Quader (born 1948), Commerce Minister of Bangladesh
- Fazal Karim Miah (born 1951), West Bengal politician
- Tamser Ali (born 1953), West Bengal politician
- Nashid Kamal (born 1958), singer
- Hossain Mokbul Shahriar (born 1974), member of the Bangladesh parliament
- Saad Ershad (born 1983), businessman

== See also ==
- Rajbongshi people
- Bengali Muslims
- Punjabi Shaikh
- Shaikhs in South Asia
