= Deshi people =

Indigenous people from Assam

Deshi
দেশী; উজানী

Regions with significant populations
- India (Assam, West Bengal)

Languages
- Assamese, Deshi, Goalpariya, Kamtapuri/Rangpuri, Rajbanshi

Religion
- Islam

Related ethnic groups
- Koch, Surjapuri, Mech, Maria, Goriya people

Deshi, Uzani or Koch Muslims (Assamese-Kamtapuri: দেশী জনগোষ্ঠী, উজানী) people are an indigenous Muslim community residing mostly in Assam and other parts of eastern India. The Deshi Muslim people can be found in Meghalaya, North Bengal, eastern Bihar, parts of Rangpur in Bangladesh. In West Bengal and Bihar they are known as Nashya Shaikh or Surjapuri Muslim. Deshis are Muslim converts from Koch, Mech or other indigenous communities. In July, 2022, the Government of Assam gave them recognition as an "Indigenous Assamese Muslims" community vide an Order.

The community is categorized as General category in Assam and OBC West Bengal.

== History ==
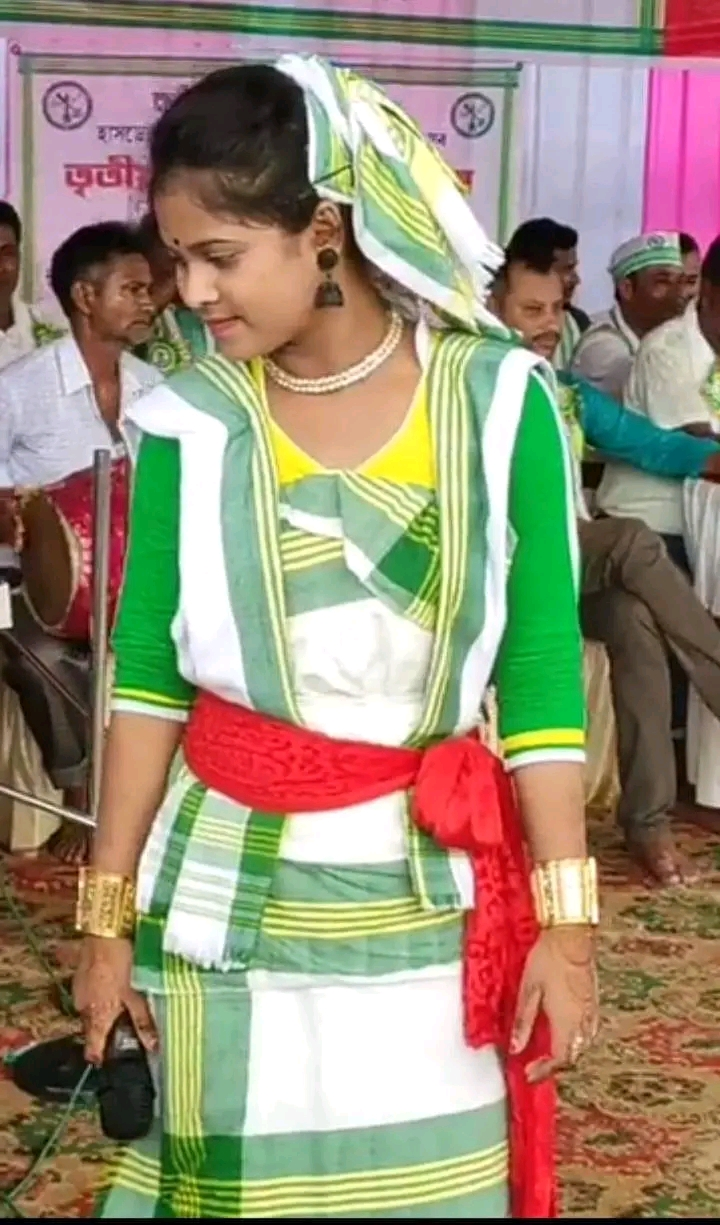
Girl with traditional attire belongs to Deshi Community of Western Assam

The Deshi (literal meaning: local or original) community identifies themselves as the original ethnic inhabitant of this land similar to the other tribal communities. They belonged to a range of indigenous communities, such as Koch, Rabha, Mech, Garo, Nath, Yogi etc.

Deshi community is one of the old ethnic groups of Assam. It has the recorded history dates back to 13th century, some quarter century prior to the arrival of Chaolung Sukaphaa, the founder of Ahom dynasty. Ali Mech is said to be the first person of the community and he led the native force during Bakhtiyar Khalji's Tibet campaign in 1205. Deshi Muslims are the descendants of Ali Mech.

The group once known as Koch Muslim. They are homogeneous with the Koch Rajbongshi people and are bi-linguistic speaking both Assamese language and Kamatapuri language.

Most other conversions took place during the 16th century, when the lower-class Koch and Mech people unable to find a respectable position in the newly formed Koch kingdom (1515–1956) switched to Islam. The conversion of Kamata ruler Chakradhvaj (1455–1485) to Islam popularized this religion among the local people.

Assam’s Deshi Muslims, around 21 lakh in number, are spread across the districts of Bongaigaon, Chirang, Dhubri, Goalpara, Kokrajhar, Kamrup, South Salmara-Mankachar, and Kamrup (Metro). They belonged to a range of indigenous Assamese communities, such as Koch, Rabha, Mech, Garo, Nath, Yogi and Kalita.

== Deshi on Gov. Records ==
=== The 1881 Census of India ===
"Those who have been converted to Islam have been absorbed in the great fraternity of that religion, while those who have not accepted Mahammedanism, are to all intents and purposes low caste Hindoos… there is clear evidence they were once a very numerous race, and the kingdom they ruled for two centuries comprised the Bengal districts of Dinagpore and the districts of Kamrup and Gowalpara in Assam. Their power was broken up about the year 1750, A.D….. Their unmistakable darkness of colour is found very largely to this day in Rungpore and Dinajpore, and they have supplied the great majority of the converts to Mahammedism in those districts. None of them have returned their mother tongue as Koch. They have long since abandoned that for Bengali, and the inhabitants of Koch Behar have adopted the same fashion." (Report on the Census of British India taken on 17 February 1881, Page 211). "The Koch ... people, who once had a religion and language of their own, have completely abandoned their language and have either been converted to Islam or have become low caste Hindoos, affording a striking example of the way in which Hindooism is replenished. (Report on the Census of British India taken on 17 February 1881, Page 296).

=== ‘A Statistical Account of Assam’ Vol-II Pub.1879 ===
W.W. Hunter was the Director General of Statistics of British India. In his book A Statistical Account of Assam’ Vol-II published in 1879, page 31 mentioned Musalman Koch. He said, "The total of the Kochs has been considerably reduced by the exclusion of a number of Musalman Kochs, who had been erroneously included; and the total of the ' unspecified ' Muhammadans has been correspondingly augmented." The present Deshi Muslims are the descendants of those Musalman Koch as mentioned by Hunter.

In West Bengal, the Deshi Muslims are known as Nashya Shaikh or Nashya Sekh. Their origin to the indigenous communities of Koch people of northern West Bengal and Assam, some of them are also from Mech community. They are culturally and linguistically similar to both people of northern Bangladesh and the erstwhile Goalpara district of Assam. A small number of the community are also found in the neighboring state of Bihar, where they are known as the Bengali Shaikh. The group is descended from a set of tribals which were collectively referred to as Koches, who converted to Islam as they were unable to find a favourable position in Hindu society and came to be known as the Rajbanshi Muslims. They are homogeneous with the Koch people and are bilingual, speaking both Bengali and Surjapuri. The Nashya still retain many cultural traits of their pre-Islamic past. For instance the reverence of pirs was a continuation of their previous beliefs. Most people of the community are non-practicing Muslims though the newer generations are becoming increasing Islamic due to globalization. From historic evidence, it seems a segment of the population of northern Bengal began to convert to Islam when the region fell under the control of Bakhtiyar Khilji. Some of the earliest converts were the chiefs Ali Mech and Kala Pahar.

== Language ==
The language of Deshi Muslim is known as 'Deshi Bhasa’. There are some slight variations in the Deshi Bhasa as one move from one district to another. The Deshi Bhasa have five dialects in Assam-Barbondi, Mahendragonji, Bausia, Ghullia and Jhaarue. The Deshi Bhasha is known differently in various states in government documents. In Assam, it is vaguely called as Goalpariya. The Deshi Bhasa is closely related to neighbouring Assamese and Rajbanshi, as well as many other Indo-Aryan languages of Assam including the Urdu.

The nouns in Deshi language takes [i] or [ni] as suffix to indicate feminine gender. If the noun ends in a vowel, it replaces the vowel with [i], if in consonant it suffixes [ni] as feminine marker. For example,

| Masculine | Meaning | Feminine | Meaning |
|---|---|---|---|
| Chengr-a | boy | Chengr-i | girl |
| Bet-a | son | Bet-i | daughter |
| Daktar | Doctor(M) | daktar-ni | doctor(F) |

== Culture ==
Many belief, rites and ceremonies of deshi people are closely resembles with those of Assamese Hindus especially with Rajbanshis. Deshi farmers perform several seasonal and agriculture rituals that carry strong hindu cultural influences. Their marriage customs also show notable similarities, including the use of banana plants, vermilion marks, conch-shell bangles, turmeric, ceremonial bands, and traditional wedding songs. Some married Deshi women even wear sindoor on their foreheads. The use of maab halodbi (a turmeric–green gram paste) is considered especially auspicious in Deshi weddings.

In Goalpara, people celebrate a local adaptation of Diwali known as Gasa Laga. The Deshis observe the same festival but refer to it as Diya Bati ot Chorat. Similar to how the Bodos have Boisagu and the Rabhas celebrate Boishu, the Deshi Muslims also observe their own form of Bihu, called Beshoma, which is also known as Bishma or Chait-Boishne.

== Organizations ==
The Deshi Janagosthiya Mancha (DJM) is the lone organization which represent the community in A

Assam Goria Parishad

== See also ==
- Assamese Muslims
- Miya people
- Maria People
- Goria People
