= Ilias Ali =

Ilias Ali may refer to:

- Ilias Ali (Bangladeshi politician) (1961–2012), Bangladeshi politician
- Ilias Ali (Indian politician) (born 1960), Indian politician
- Ilias Ali (figure skater) (born 1994), Kazakhstani former ice dancer
- Ilias Ali (surgeon) (born 1955), Indian surgeon
