= Islam in Bengal (disambiguation) =

Islam in Bengal may refer to:

- Bengali Muslims, an ethnic religious population
- Islam in Bangladesh, the world's third largest Muslim majority country
- Islam in West Bengal, home to three Bengali Muslim majority districts
- Islam in Assam, home to a significant Bengali Muslim population
