= O Jibon Re =

- Directed by: Robin Chandra Roy
- Written by: Robin Chandra Roy
- Produced by: Robin Chandra Roy
- Starring: J P Mazumder; Moinul Hoque; Azibur Rahman; Mehbub Hasan; Prodip Roy; Ayaan Anisur
- Cinematography: Sibber Ahmed
- Edited by: Sibber Ahmed
- Production company: R C R production Dhubri
- Release date: 15 August 2014
- Running time: 27 minutes
- Country: India
- Language: Goalpariya

O Jibon Re (Assamese: ও জীৱন ৰে) is a 2014 Indian Goalparia language (one shot) video film, written and directed by Robin Chandra Roy. Under banner of R C R Production.

== Cast ==
- J P Mazumder
- Moinul Hoque
- Azibur Rahman
- Mehbub Hasan
- Prodip Roy
