= Osman Ali Sadagar =

Assam politician

Sheikh Osman Ali Sadagar

Member of the 1st Assam Legislative Assembly
- In office 19 January 1937 – 1946
- Constituency: Nagaon

Personal details
- Born: 1856 Bengal Presidency
- Died: 28 April 1948 (aged 91–92) Assam, Dominion of India

Sheikh Osman Ali Sadagar (Assamese: শেখ ওছমান আলী সদাগৰ, Bengali: শেখ ওছমান আলী সওদাগর; 1856 – 28 April 1948) was a politician, cultivator and educationist. He served as a member of the inaugural Assam Legislative Assembly, and opposed the integration of Assam into the Dominion of Pakistan. Sadagar is considered to be a pioneer of the cultural and linguistic Assamisation of the Miya community. The Chor Chapori Literary Council named the Osman Ali Sadagar Honorary Award in his memory.

== Early life and migration ==
Sadagar was born into a Bengali Muslim family in the Bengal Presidency.

== Career ==
In 1885, he migrated to Alitangani in Nowgong, Assam with the help of his uncle, Nazrul Ali. Ali worked in the steam ships that flowed through the rivers of Bengal and Assam at the time. He participated in the Battle of Patharughat of 1894 where he was injured.

In 1902, Sadagar founded a primary school in Alitangani, Nowgong. According to doctoral researcher Hafiz Ahmed, the school was the second Assamese-medium institution from the Bengal-origin Muslim migrant community of Assam. Sadagar was also a member of the Asam Sahitya Sabha, partaking in its inaugural 1917 session where he donated 10 British Indian rupees (today equivalent to 130 American dollars) to it.

He independently contested in the first Assam legislative elections in 1937, and was successfully elected as a member of the Assam Legislative Assembly from the Nagaon constituency. In the politics of Assam, Sadagar opposed both ethnic Assamese politician Muhammed Saadulah and the ethnic Bengali politician Abdul Hamid Khan Bhashani. He later left the All-India Muslim League entirely. Under his leadership, five independent Muslim politicians represented themselves in the assembly, who all opposed the Muslim League's plans to integrate Assam into the Dominion of Pakistan.

== Death and legacy ==
Sadagar died in Assam. His son, Abdul Shahid, was also a politician. In 2019, false NRC claims were made against his descendants. Among those that defended them was the Leader of the Opposition Debabrata Saikia.
