= Bashbari =

Bashbari বাশবাৰী
- Bashbari
- Country: India
- State: Assam
- District: Goalpara

Government
  - Body: Bashbari Gaon Panchayat

Language
  - Official: English, Assamese
  - Local: Assamese, Goalpariya

Bashbari is a Gaon Panchayat of Goalpara District, state of Assam, India.

== Education ==
There are a number of educational facilities:

- Bashbari ME Madrassa - from class 5 to 8; medium - Assamese
- Bashbari High School - from class 9 and 10
- Bashbari Adarsha Jatiya Bidyalaya - a private sector institute
- Darul Ulum Tahfizul Qur'an Bashbari - for Islamic education
- AN Academy, Bashbari
