= Jayantipur Bor Mosque =

Mosque in Nagaon, Assam, India

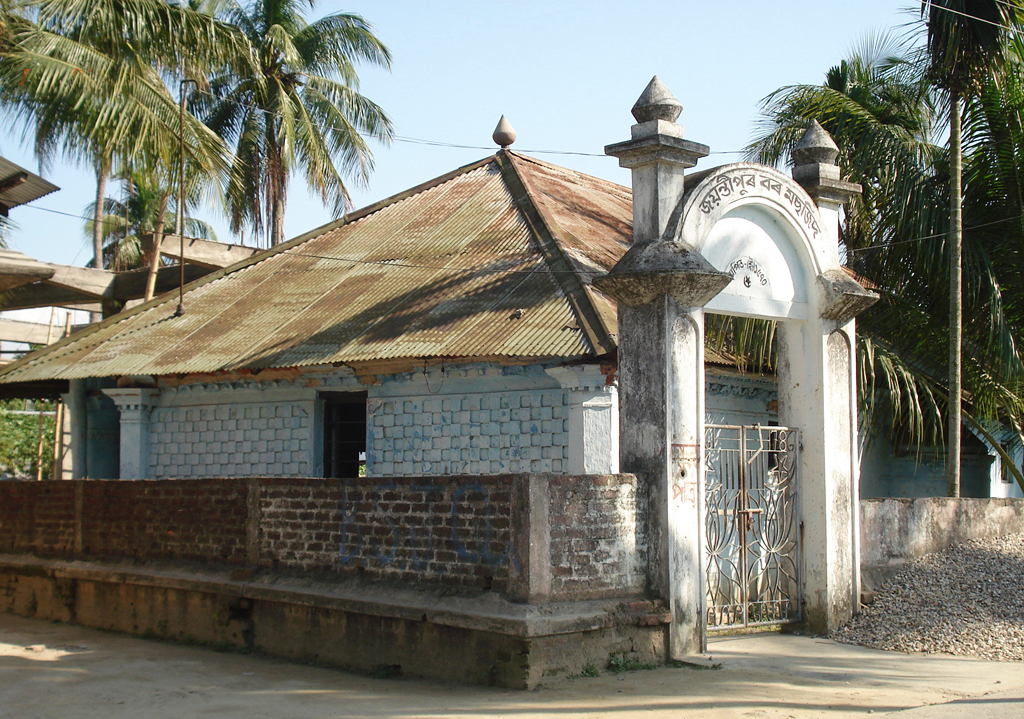

Religion
- Affiliation: Islam

Location
- Municipality: Nagaon
- State: Assam
- Country: India
- Interactive map of Jayantipur Bor Mosque
- Coordinates: 26°33′19″N 92°55′57″E

Architecture
- Type: mosque

Jayantipur Bor Mosque also known as Bora Masjid is a historic mosque located at Jayantipur village, Kuwaritol in the Kaliabor area of Nagaon district, in the Indian state of Assam. It is regarded as one of the oldest mosques in Assam, a blend of Islamic and Assamese architectural traditions.

== History ==
The origins of the mosque are associated with the settlement of Muslim communities in the Kaliabor region during the Ahom period. Historical accounts relate that Muslim soldiers captured during conflicts between the Ahom kingdom and invading forces were settled in the area and gradually formed the Moriya Muslim community. A temporary mosque originally existed at Jayantipur and was later replaced by a permanent brick structure in 1570. It is a popular place of worship for more than four centuries.
