= Moria people =

Indigenous Assamese Muslim group in Assam, India

Maria Muslims (also spelled Moriya or Moria Muslims) are an indigenous Muslim community of Assam in northeast India, traditionally associated with brass and bell-metal metalworking.They are considered part of the Assamese-speaking Muslim population rather than Bengali-origin migrant Muslims. Historically, the Maria (Moriya) are believed to descend from Mughal Muslim soldiers who settled in Assam after the Ahom–Mughal conflicts of the early 16th century. According to ethnographic studies, these Muslim soldiers were captives from the 1532 invasion led by Turbak Khan; after being defeated by the Ahoms, they remained in Assam and became metalworkers, eventually being known as "Moriyas".

== Etymology ==
The term Moriya (also spelled Maria or Moria) is believed to derive from the Assamese word moriyā (Assamese: মৰিয়া) which meaning "one who hammers or beats metal", reflecting the community’s historical occupation as brass and bell-metal workers. The root mor or mar in Assamese implies striking or shaping metal objects, and the term gradually became a community label. Though the name sounds similar to "Miya", which denotes Bengali-origin Muslims in Assam, the Maria/Moriya are culturally and linguistically distinct.

== Historical origins ==
The Moriyas are traditionally believed to be descendants of Mughal Muslim prisoners of war taken by the Ahoms after General Turbak Khan's invasion in 1532. These captives settled permanently in Assam and took up the trade of brass and bell-metal craft.

By the late 19th century, Moriyas were recognized in the Census of India as a distinct low-status Muslim group. The 1891 and 1901 censuses listed "Moriya Musalmans" separately in the Assamese Muslim population.

In July 2022, the Government of Assam officially recognized the Moriyas as one of five "indigenous Assamese Muslim" communities, distinct from later migrant Muslims such as the Bengali-speaking Miya.

== Culture and traditions ==
The Maria/Moriya community follows Sunni Islam, participating in major Islamic festivals and rituals. However, their social customs are influenced by Assamese Hindu practices, and many of their cultural traditions resemble those of Assamese society. For instance, they celebrate local festivals, conduct marriages and funerals in Assamese custom, and speak Assamese as their native language.

Traditionally, the community was engaged in metal craft. Over time, this occupation shaped their identity and contributed to their lower socioeconomic status. In 1975, the Assam government categorized the community under the "Other Backward Class" classification.

The community also maintains institutions such as the All Assam Goriya-Moriya-Deshi Parishad, which represents Assamese Muslim groups. In 2022, this organization welcomed the state’s move to recognize Moriyas as indigenous Muslims.

Moriyas speak Assamese as their mother tongue, often with a slight dialectal variation, such as elongated vowels. They once maintained a sociolect or "secret" internal dialect, but it is now largely obsolete.

Traditional products such as dīgaon (brass cooking vessels) and kans narir tal (gram pans) are part of Assamese rural household life and are often attributed to Moriya craftsmen.

== Demographic distribution ==
The Maria/Moriya population is concentrated in around 66 villages across 11 districts of Assam, with an estimated population of approximately 200,000. They are particularly found in eastern and southern Assam districts like Dibrugarh, Sivasagar, Tinsukia, and Nagaon. Small pockets also exist in urban areas like Guwahati (e.g., Hajo and Uzan Bazar).

== See also ==
- Islam in Assam
- Meitei Pangals
- Goriya People
- Deshi people
- Miya people
