= Miya people =

Bengali-origin Muslims of Assam

Miya
মিঞা মিয়াঁ

Total population
- c. 11-12 million (estimated)

Regions with significant populations
- India (Assam) 10 million (30% of Assam's population)(as of 2011)

Languages
- Bengali (mainly Eastern Bengali) • Assamese • Other Bengali-Assamese languages

Religion
- Sunni Islam

Related ethnic groups
- Bengali Muslims, Assamese Muslims, Mahimal

The Miya people, alternatively identified as Na-Asamiya by themselves (lit. neo-Assamese), denote the progeny of Bengali Muslim migrants originating from the contemporary Mymensingh, Tangail, Rangpur, Rajshahi and Cumilla regions. These individuals established residence in the Brahmaputra Valley during the 20th century, coinciding with the period of British colonial rule in Assam. The migration of the Miya people was actively promoted by the Colonial British Government from the Bengal Province, spanning the years 1757 to 1942. This migratory trend persisted until the year 1947. Presently, the term "Miya" is often considered a pejorative word, despite its origins as a term of respect.

== Etymology ==
The nomenclature "Miya" finds its etymological roots in "mian," an honorific of Persian origin commonly employed throughout the Indian subcontinent when addressing a Muslim gentleman. Originally utilised in a derogatory manner against the aforementioned community, the term has undergone a process of re-appropriation by a cadre of Miya poets who are actively asserting their cultural identity. Presently, "Miya" or "Miya Musalman" has entered the sphere of serious discourse.

Concurrently, the term "Na-Asamiya," as articulated in the Assamese language, conveys the literal meaning of 'neo-Assamese'. This term was adopted by the community and forced the local elites in Assam as a means of establishing a connection with the region by pushing political power backed by the Indian National Congress and AIUDF during their tenure and creating a new identity which didn't exist before.

An alternative designation for this community is "Charua Musalman," signifying Muslims residing in the chars (riverine islands), a preference evident in their settlement patterns. They are also referred to as "Pamua Musalman," denoting Muslim farmers, given that agriculture serves as their primary source of livelihood.

== History ==
=== Internal migration to Assam ===
The internal migration of Bengali Muslims from Rangpur, Rajshahi, Comilla, Rangpur, Mymensingh, Pabna and Bogra districts of British Bengal presidency (present Bangladesh) to Kamrup (present Assam) started during the census decade of 1901–1911. According to census reports, there was a large-scale migration of human population from eastern Bengal to Assam between 1911 and 1941. 85% of the immigrant population were socially and economically underprivileged Muslims who settled down in the wastelands of Assam. The majority of the internal migrants came from the erstwhile undivided Mymensingh and Rangpur districts of present Bangladesh, What were territories of Kamrupa Kingdom.

The internal migration of Muslims peasants from East Bengal of former Pakistan was officially encouraged prior to the Partition of India by the British imperialists, the All-India Muslim League as well as a section of the Assamese elite; but it was only considered illegal after the Partition of India in 1947 when Assam belonged to India and East Bengal to Pakistan. Many of these migrant Muslims settled on the chars or riverine islands on the Brahmaputra and other low-lying areas. After the Independence of India in 1947, the group gave up their Bengali linguistic identity, adopting the Assamese language as their native language. Gradually they adopted Assamese culture which has led to them being known as Na-Asamiya (Neo-Assamese, who are Bengali origin). The Na-Asamiyas constitute the largest of the four major Muslim ethnic groups in Assam, who together constitute a third of Assam's electorate.

The local gentry of Assam including matabbars, Barpetia matigiris, Marwaris and Assamese moneylenders encouraged the internal migration out of their own interests. The matabbars (literally meaning 'influential person' in Bengali) were the earlier migrants, who owned large amounts of fallow cultivable lands ranging from 1,000 to 5,000 acres. With the ambition of becoming landlords they would send out the message of availability of cultivable lands to their impoverished kinsmen in their native villages in eastern Bengal. They would then either unofficially lease out their lands to the internal migrant Muslims who arrived later or hire them to cultivate their lands. Thus, they would act as de facto landlords. The Barpetia matigiris were a section of Assamese gentry in Barpeta district who made profit by selling excess lands to the internal migrant Muslims and encouraged further migration to make even quicker profits. The Marwaris and the Assamese money lenders financed the internal migrant Muslims for the cultivation of jute, ahu rice, pulses and vegetables.

== Demography ==
Miyas have a population of almost over 10 million which is spread throughout Assam covering 21% of the state population as of 2021 estimation, though they are mainly concentrated in Barpeta, Dhuburi, Goalpara, Kamrup, Nagaon, Hojai, Darrang, Chirang, Kokrajhar, South Salmara, Nalbari, Morigaon, Sonitpur and Bongaigaon.

== Language ==
In the Presidential address of the 1940 Assam Sahitya Sabha held at Jorhat. Dr. Moidul Islam Bora, an Assamese Muslim himself, happily noted that a community leader from the migrant Muslim community had proudly acknowledged the community's firm resolution become the part of mainstream Assamese culture. After the Partition of India, the Muslim League dissolved the party in Assam and asked the Muslim people to join the Congress. The Muslim League leadership proposed that the Muslims should accept the language and culture of the country of their residence. Accordingly, the leadership asked the Muslims of Assam to register themselves as Assamese speaking during the census. The leadership also asked the Muslims to identify themselves as Assamese and send their children to Assamese medium schools. As directed by the Muslim League leadership, the migrant Muslims gave up their linguistic identity and adopted Assamese as their language. In the 1951 census, the no. of Assamese speakers in Assam rose to 56.7%.

Gradually the Assamese intelligentsia also began to accept the migrant Muslims in the fold of Assamese identity. Benudhar Sharma, President of 1956 Assam Sahitya Sabha held at Dhubri, felt that the mainstream Assamese people were happy to welcome the internal migrant Muslims into the Assamese fold, just like the Koch, Kachari and Ahoms. By this time the migrant Muslims began to establish Assamese-medium schools and colleges, attempting to merge themselves into the mainstream of Assamese culture. In 1961, the Census Commissioner reported that the Na-Asamiyas were honest in their intent to learn the Assamese language and send their children to Assamese-medium schools. The migrant Muslims thus came to be known as the Na-Asamiyas. To this day, there is not a single Bengali-medium school in the areas dominated by the Na-Asamiyas.

With the official acceptance of Assamese language and close proximity to Goalpariya speakers, the Miya developed a creole Miya home language. The Miya officially adopted the Assamese language during the language movement.

== Culture ==
=== Poetry ===
Numerous scholars affiliated with the Miya community are actively engaged in endeavours aimed at the amelioration of Miya society, primarily through the medium of Miya poetry. A central objective of this literary pursuit is the reclamation of the term "Miya," which frequently assumes a pejorative connotation when used by non-Muslims. The thematic orientation of Miya poetry converges on addressing multifaceted challenges such as poverty, population growth, and the promotion of literacy within the Miya community.

Notably, the emergence of Miya poetry has generated controversy in the socio-cultural landscape of Assam, particularly eliciting responses from the indigenous populace. The inception of this movement can be traced back to the publication of "Write Down, I am a Miya" by Hafiz Ahmed in 2016. The ensuing discourse surrounding Miya poetry has led to accusations, both in media discourse and formal complaints to law enforcement agencies, characterising this literary expression as "anti-Assamese," notwithstanding its composition in the Assamese language.

== Notable people ==
- Hafiz Ahmed (born 1962), social activist
- Osman Ali Sadagar (1856–1948), politician and educationist
- Mahbubul Hoque, Chancellor of University of Science and Technology, Meghalaya

== See also ==
- Deshi people
- Illegal Migrants (Determination by Tribunal) Act, 1983
