= Stuart N. Wolfenden =

American linguist

Stuart Norris Wolfenden (1889 – 28 December 1938) was a linguist who worked at the University of California, Berkeley during the first part of the 20th century. During the New Deal he was titular head of the Sino-Tibetan philology project, which both Robert Shafer and Paul K. Benedict were directors of. In the 1970s the 'Stuart Wolfenden Society' was founded in his honor, together with a monograph series 'Occasional papers of the Wolfenden Society', in which James Matisoff published many of his early works.

== Works of Wolfenden ==
- 1928. "The significance of early Tibetan word forms." Journal of the Royal Asiatic Society of Great Britain and Ireland (New Series) 60.4: 896-99.
- 1928. "The Prefix m- with Certain Substantives in Tibetan." Language 4.4:277-280.
- 1929. "On ok myit and she pok, with a proposed revision of the terminology of Burmese tones." Journal of the Burma Research Society 19.2: 57-66.
- 1929. Outlines of Tibeto-Burman linguistic morphology, with special reference to the prefixes, infixes and suffixes of classical Tibetan and the languages of the Kachin, Bodo, Nǎgǎ, Kuki-Chin and Burma groups. London: Royal Asiatic Society.
- 1929. Note on the tribal name Båṛå Fi-sā. Journal of the Royal Asiatic Society of Great Britain and Ireland (New Series) 61.3: 581-583.
- 1929. A further note on Båṛå Fi-sā. Journal of the Royal Asiatic Society of Great Britain and Ireland (New Series) 61.4: 869-870.
- 1931. On the Tibetan Transcription of Si-Hia Words. Journal of the Royal Asiatic Society of Great Britain and Ireland (New Series) 63.1: 47-52.
- 1931. Review of Tibetisch-Chinesische Wortgleichungen, Ein Versuch von Walter Simon. Reprinted from Mitteilungen des Seminars für Orientalische Sprachen, Bd. xxxii, Abt. 1. 9 7/8 + 6 ¾ inches. pp. 72. Berlin and Leipzig: Walter de Gruyter, 1930. Journal of the Royal Asiatic Society of Great Britain and Ireland (New Series) 63.1: 210-213.
- 1933. "Specimen of a Khambu dialect from Dilpa, Nepal." Journal of the Royal Asiatic Society of Great Britain and Ireland (New Series) 65.4: 845-56. [Khambu, Rungchenbong]
- 1934. "Specimen of the Sāngpāng Dialect." Acta Orientalia 12.1: 71-9.
- 1935. "A specimen of the Kūlung Dialect." Acta Orientalia 13: 35-43.
- 1934. "On the Prefixes and Consonantal Finals of Si-Hia as evidenced by their Chinese and Tibetan transcriptions." Journal of the Royal Asiatic Society of Great Britain and Ireland (New Series) 66.4: 745-770.
- 1934. Review of Dialects of Tibet; the Tibetan Dialect of Lahul, by Georges de Roerich. 10 x 7, pp 1 + 107. New York and Naggar, Kulu, Punjab: Urusvati Himalayan Research Institute of the Roerich Museum, n.d., 1933. Journal of the Royal Asiatic Society of Great Britain and Ireland (New Series) 66.4: 843-843.
- 1935. "Note on the tribal name Mes (Mech)." Journal of the Royal Asiatic Society of Great Britain and Ireland (New Series) 67.1: 145-146.
- 1935. "A specimen of the Thūlung Dialect." Journal of the Royal Asiatic Society of Great Britain and Ireland (New Series) 67.4: 629-53.
- 1936. "Notes on the Jyarong dialect of eastern Tibet. T'oung Pao ser. 2, 32.2/3:167-204.
- 1936. "On certain alternations between dental finals in Tibetan and Chinese." Journal of the Royal Asiatic Society of Great Britain and Ireland (New Series) 68.3: 401-416.
- 1937. "Concerning the variation of final consonants in the word families of Tibetan, Kachin and Chinese." Journal of the Royal Asiatic Society of Great Britain and Ireland (New Series) 69.4: 625-655.
- 1938. Review of A Dictionary of the Classical Newārī, by Hans Jørgensen. Det Kgl. Danske Videnskabernes Selskab Historisk-filologiske Meddelelser, XXIII, i. 9½ × 6, pp. 178. København: Levin and Munksgaard, 1936. Journal of the Royal Asiatic Society of Great Britain and Ireland (New Series) 70.3: 444-446.
- 1938. "Concerning the origins of Tibetan brgi̯ad and Chinese 八 'pwât'." T'oung Pao 34.3: 165-73.
- 1939. "On the restitution of final consonants in certain word types of Burmese." Acta Orientalia 17.2:153-168.
