= Surjapuri people =

Ethnic group of eastern India and neighbouring areas

Surjapuri
सुरजापुरी

Total population
- est. 2-5 million (2011 census and later estimates)

Regions with significant populations
- Parts of northeastern Bihar and northern West Bengal in India, parts of Bangladesh and southeastern Nepal

Languages
- Surjapuri

Religion
- Majority Islam; Minority Hinduism

Related ethnic groups
- Bengali people, Maithili people, Nashya Shaikh people, Rajbanshi people

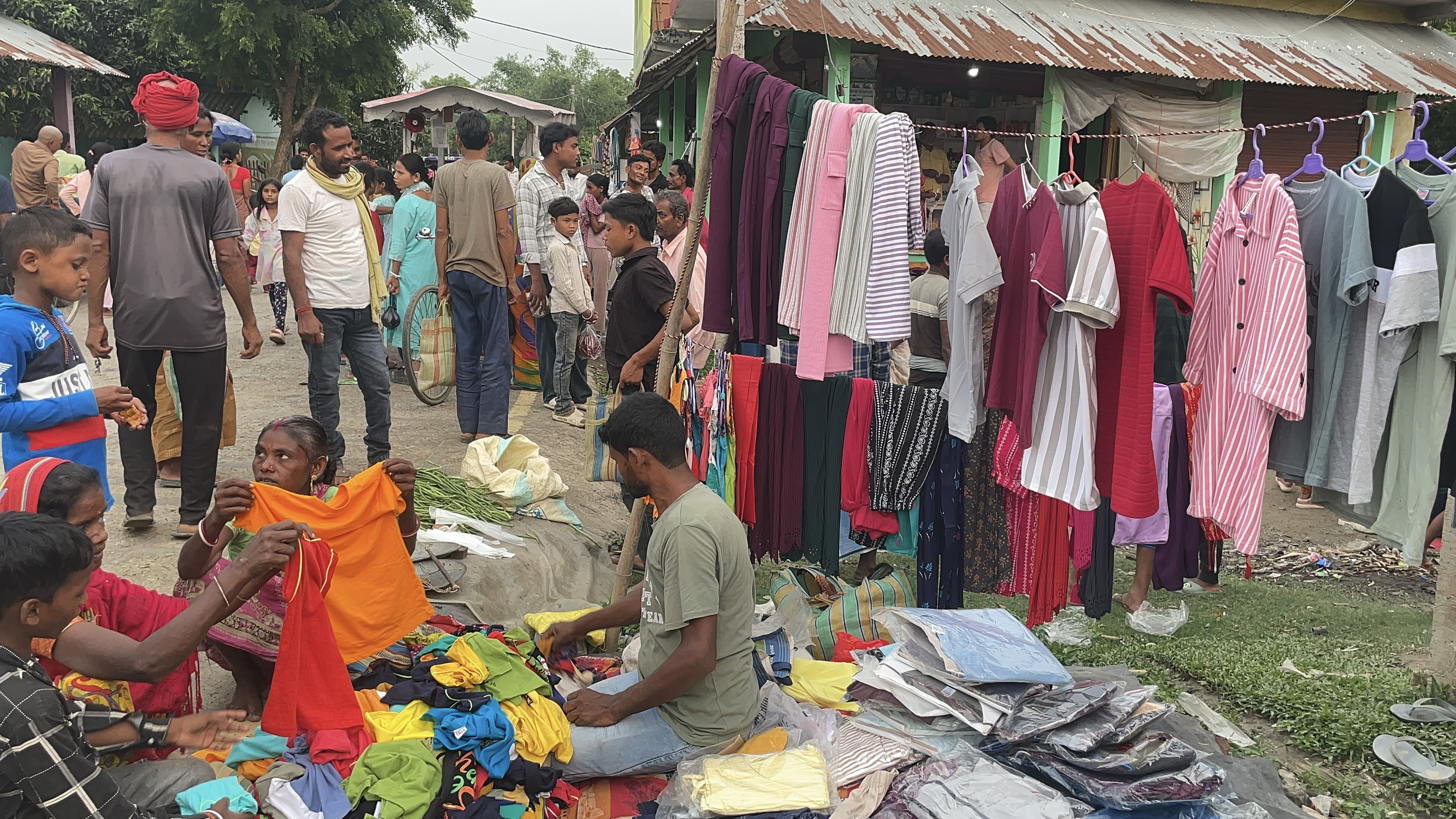
A clothes trader in a Haat bazaar in a Surjapuri speaking village

The Surjapuri people are an ethnolinguistic indigenous minority community primarily found in the eastern Gangetic plains of South Asia. They are concentrated in parts of northern Bihar and northern West Bengal in India and have populations in adjacent districts of Bangladesh and eastern Nepal. They are one of the most marginalized groups in the region. The group is closely associated with the Surjapuri language, an Indo-Aryan tongue of the Bengali-Assamese branch, and the community includes both Muslim and Hindu adherents.

== Names and etymology ==
The name "Surjapuri" is commonly understood to derive from "Surjapur" or "Siripuri", historical toponyms used in colonial and local records for parts of the present Kishanganj and adjoining areas. Older linguists and colonial administrators sometimes recorded related local names such as "Surjapuriya", "Siripuria", "Surjayi" or "Kishangunjia".

== Language ==
The Surjapuri community is defined largely by its speech of the Surjapuri language (ISO 639-3: sjp), an Indo-Aryan language classified within the Eastern group and closely related to the Bengali-Assamese cluster. Surjapuri exhibits lexical and structural influence from neighboring languages such as Bengali and Assamese and displays typological features that have been discussed in descriptive studies. According to the 2011 Indian census the number of Surjapuri speakers recorded was over two million; later community surveys and regional studies estimate a higher figure in the mid millions.

== Geographic distribution ==
Surjapuri speakers and the related ethnic community are mainly concentrated in the Kishanganj, Purnia, Katihar and Araria districts of northeastern Bihar and in parts of Uttar Dinajpur and Jalpaiguri divisions of northern West Bengal. Smaller Surjapuri populations live across the nearby international frontiers in Thakurgaon District of Bangladesh and in Jhapa District of southeastern Nepal. Local settlement is largely rural with market towns serving as cultural and commercial hubs.

== History and origins ==
Historical references in colonial gazetteers and the Linguistic Survey of India note varieties called "Siripuria" or related local names in the Purnia and adjacent areas. Over time, speakers of these local speech varieties coalesced into the present Surjapuri identity, shaped by agrarian livelihoods, local trade networks, and the religious and social institutions of the region. The community reflects the multilingual contact zone of the eastern Gangetic plains where Indo-Aryan varieties meet Tibeto-Burmese and Austroasiatic influences.

== Society and culture ==
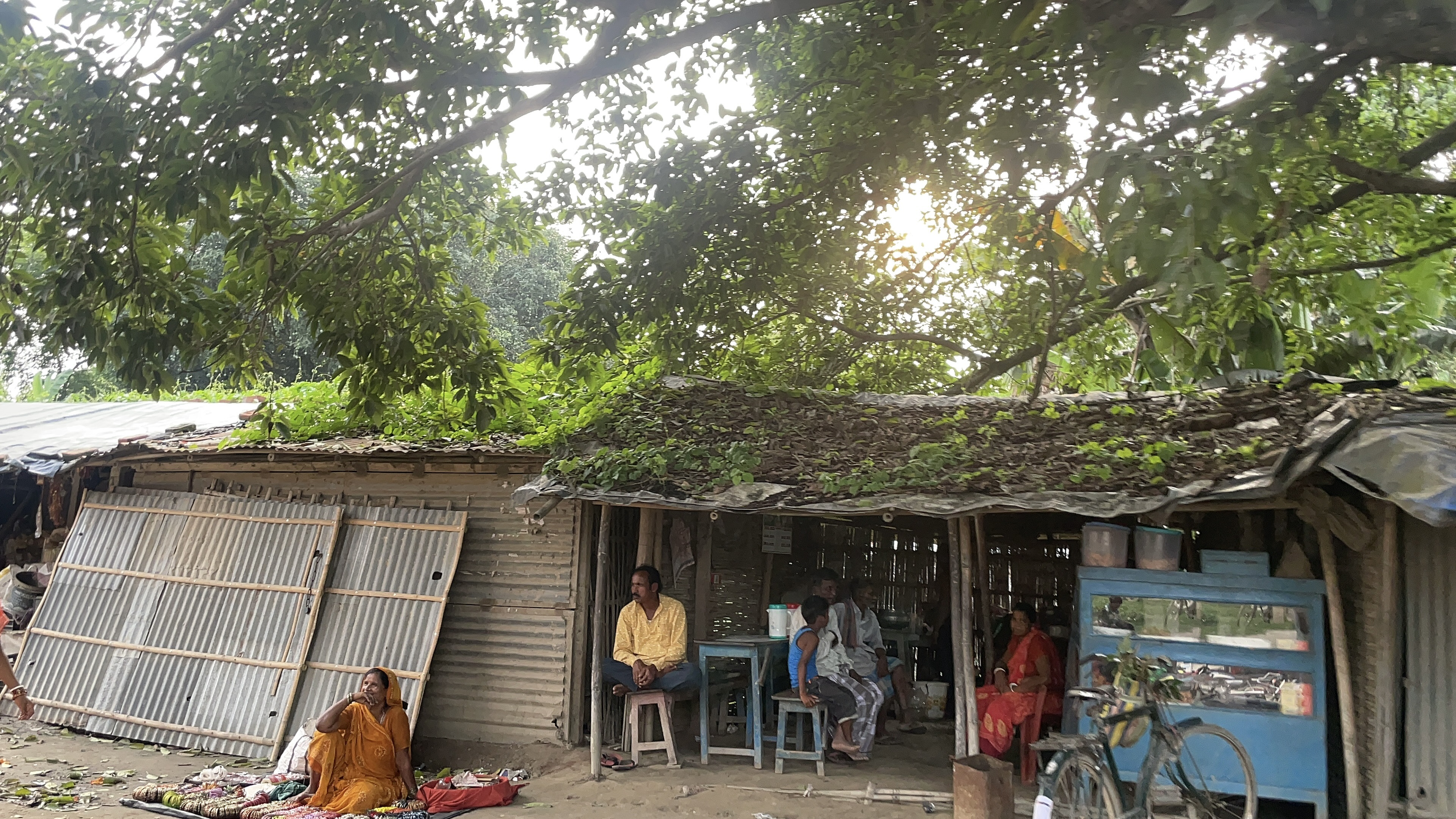
A roadside restaurant in a surjapuri speaking village

The Surjapuri community has an agrarian base with land cultivation, seasonal migration for wage labour and small-scale trade forming important economic activities. Social life includes distinctive folk music, oral narratives and customary practices that draw on both Bengali and Maithili cultural spheres. Endogamy and localized marriage practices have been reported in ethnographic writings, and community studies note patterns of social marginalization in some districts.

== Religion ==
Both Islam and Hinduism are practised among Surjapuri people, however most are Muslim and follow Islam. Regional studies show a significant Muslim Surjapuri population in parts of Kishanganj and adjacent areas while Hindu Surjapuri communities are also present. Religious affiliation often intersects with landholding patterns, occupation and local political alignments.

== Language vitality and status ==
Surjapuri is an endangered language with a declining number of speakers and under pressure from regional lingua francas such as Bengali, Hindi and Urdu. Studies cite migration, schooling in dominant languages, and media exposure as factors that influence language transmission to younger generations. Local revitalization efforts and descriptive linguistic work have been undertaken but comprehensive language planning remains limited.
