= Kuwaritol =

- town
- Interactive map of Kuwaritol
- Coordinates: 26°33′23″N 92°56′23″E
- Country: India
- State: Assam
- District: Nagaon

Languages
  - Official: Assamese
- Time zone: UTC+5:30 (IST)
- PIN: 782136
- Telephone code: 03672
- ISO 3166 code: IN-AS
- Vehicle registration: AS-
- Coastline: 0 kilometres (0 mi)
- Nearest city: Tezpur
- Lok Sabha constituency: Kaliabor

Kuwaritol is a town in Nagaon district in Assam, India

== Location ==
National Highway 37A starts from Kuwaritol. It connects the town to Tezpur, which is 23 km away

== Cultrure ==
Jayantipur Bor Mosque is located at Kuwaritol. This is the oldest mosque of the district, founded in 1570.
