= Hafiz Ahmed =

Indian teacher and poet

Dr. Hafiz Ahmed
- Born: 7 September 1962 (age 63); Kapoha, Barpeta district, Assam, India
- Education: Gauhati University
- Occupations: Teacher, poet, author, columnist, social activist
- Organization: Char Chapori Literary Council
- Known for: Pioneer of Miya poetry, Assamese language promotion
- Spouse: Rashida Ahmed
- Children: Shabnam Hafiz, Safdar Hafiz
- Parents: Madhu Miah (father); Somjan Nessa (mother)

Hafiz Ahmed is an Indian teacher, poet and social activist of Miya origin.

== Early life and education ==
Ahmed was born in Kapoha in Barpeta on 7 September 1962. He was raised in a traditional Muslim family and his parents' names were Madhu Miah and Somjan Nessa. Ahmed belongs to the Miya community which migrated to Assam from Bengal during the British Raj. He completed his PhD in Assamese literature at the prestigious Gauhati University.

== Career ==
In 2016, he pioneered an Assamese poetic genre known as Miya poetry. He is the chairman of the Char Chapori Literary Council in Assam, which aims to spread the use of the Assamese language to the Miya community. The Miya, who reside in the state's riverine areas, historically conversed in Bengali but are drifting towards Assamese identity and language.

== Personal life ==
Ahmed is the father of two children; Shabnam Hafiz and Safdar Hafiz.
