= Bakhtiyar Khalji's Tibet campaign =

1206 Ghurid campaign to invade Tibet

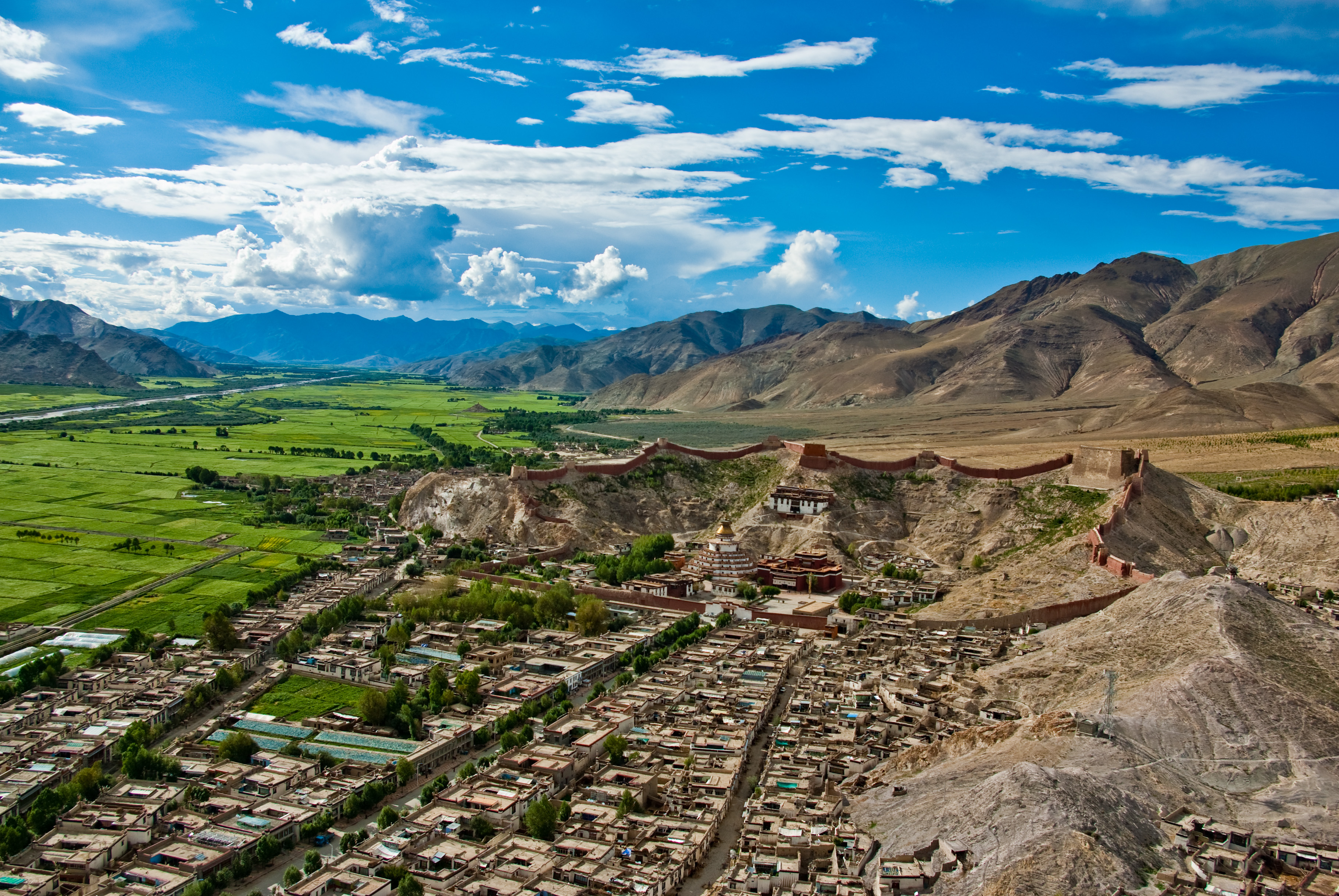
- Bakhtiyar Khalji led his army through harsh terrain into the cultivated valley of mainland Kamrup and Tibet, where he met fierce resistance and a guerrilla uprising
Date	March – June 1206
Location	Chumbi Valley, Tibet
Result	Tibetan victory

Belligerents
Khaljis of Bengal; Supported by Deshi Muslims	Tibetan tribes

Commanders and leaders
Bakhtiyar Khalji; Ali Mech	Tibetan tribal leaders

Strength
c. 10,000	Unknown

Casualties and losses
Nearly all except around hundred cavalry.	Unknown but less than Bakhtiyar

Bakhtiyar Khalji, the general of Qutb ud-Din Aibak, launched a campaign to invade Tibet from March to June 1206.

Tibet was a source for horses, the most prized possession of any army, and Khalji was keen to control the lucrative trade between Tibet and India. Khajli's army commenced plundering the country around the Tibet region of the Chumbi Valley. The people of that area and the parts adjacent advanced to repel the invaders. From daybreak to the time of evening prayer, a fierce battle ensued, and a great number of Khalji's army were killed or wounded.

== Background ==
Bakhtiyar Khalji, the general of Qutubuddin Aibak, conquered Bihar and Nadia, the capital of the Sena Kings of Bengal. He subsequently became obsessed with ambitions of conquering Tibet. Historically, Bengal had trade relations with Tibet along the 'Tea-Horse Route', through Assam, Sikkim and Bhutan, to parts of China and Southeast Asia, which were home to gold and silver mines. Tibet was also a source of horses. The planned invasion also coincided with the Era of Fragmentation and the collapse of the Tibetan Empire.

The expedition was aided by Ali Mech, a tribal chief from the foothills of the Himalayas in the north of Bengal. Mech was a recent convert to Islam, and he helped the expedition by acting as a guide.

== Campaign ==
On his way north, Khalji invited the Rai of 'Kamrud' to join him, but the latter refused. After marching for 16 days through the Teesta River area in North Bengal and Sikkim, Khalji's army reached the Chumbi Valley and started looting Tibetan villages. The rugged Himalayan mountain passes of Tibet were an unfamiliar terrain to the invading army, who were more used to the sultry and humid plains of Bengal. The Tibetans lured Khalji and his Turkic army into a trap, inflicted heavy casualties and prompted Khalji to retreat. All along the escape route, the Tibetans continued relentless guerrilla-style attacks on the retreating army. Khalji's badly defeated soldiers ate their own horses to stay alive.

On their retreat to Bengal, Khalji's army passed through the plains of North Bengal. Upon reaching the sub-alpine Himalayan region, the army tried to cross an ancient stone bridge on the foothills near the Teesta river. Khalji's soldiers found the arches in the bridge had been destroyed by Kamrup forces, making it difficult to cross the deep river. In their desperate attempt to reach the other side of the river at Devkot, Khalji's forces lost a number of men and horses. It is said that of the 10,000-strong army that had marched into Tibet, only around 100 men returned. After crossing the river, Ali Mech guided Bakhtiyar Khilji back to Devkot (present-day Dakshin Dinajpur district, West Bengal).

== Aftermath ==
There are two accounts of what happened to Bakhtiyar Khalji following the Tibet and Kamrup debacle. One account speaks of him dying from ill health and injury during this retreat to Bengal. Another account notes that he was assassinated by Ali Mardan Khalji after returning to Devkot in Bengal.

== See also ==
- British expedition to Tibet
