= Ilias Ali (surgeon) =

Surgeon (b. 1956)

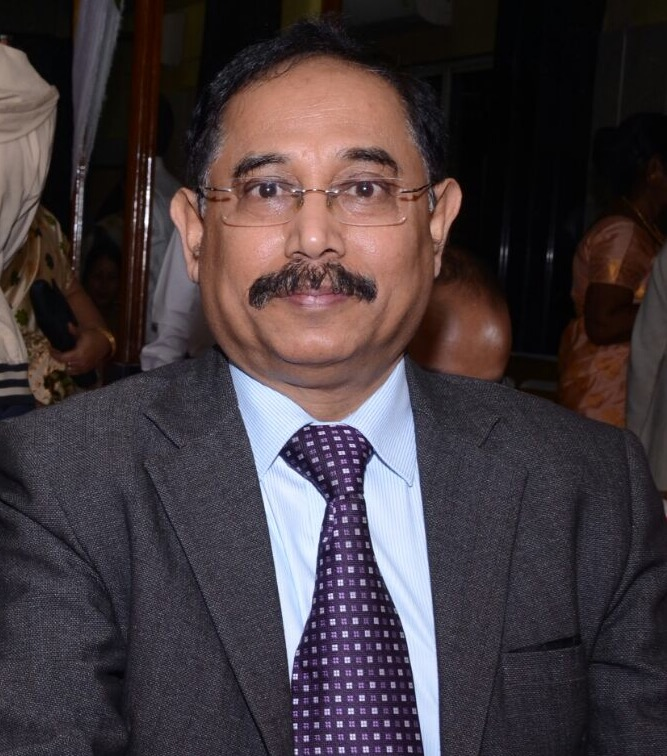

Ilias Ali (born 1955) is a surgeon from Assam, India. In 2019, Ali was conferred the Padma Shri civilian honour by the President of India, Ram Nath Kovind, for his contribution towards raising awareness about family planning and birth control measures in the remote areas of Assam.

== Career ==
He is a retired medical surgeon from the Guwahati Medical College and Hospital. He founded the Emergency Medicine department at the Gauhati Medical College and Hospital.

== Social work ==
Since 1993, Ali has been championing the cause of family planning and the necessity to adopt birth control measures in the remote areas of Assam, especially within the Bengali Muslim settlements where the use of contraceptives is prominently considered to be non-Islamic in nature. He encourages the people to undergo the No Scalpel Vasectomy (NSV) and despite strong resistance, he has motivated around 55,000 people to undergo the NSV procedure between 2008 and 2018. Ali has also spoken out against child marriage and polygamy.

== Books ==
- Kuri Satikar Mahabyadhi - AIDS
- Jana Bisfuranar Pom Khedi
