= Mech people =

Ethnic group

Mech
Mech
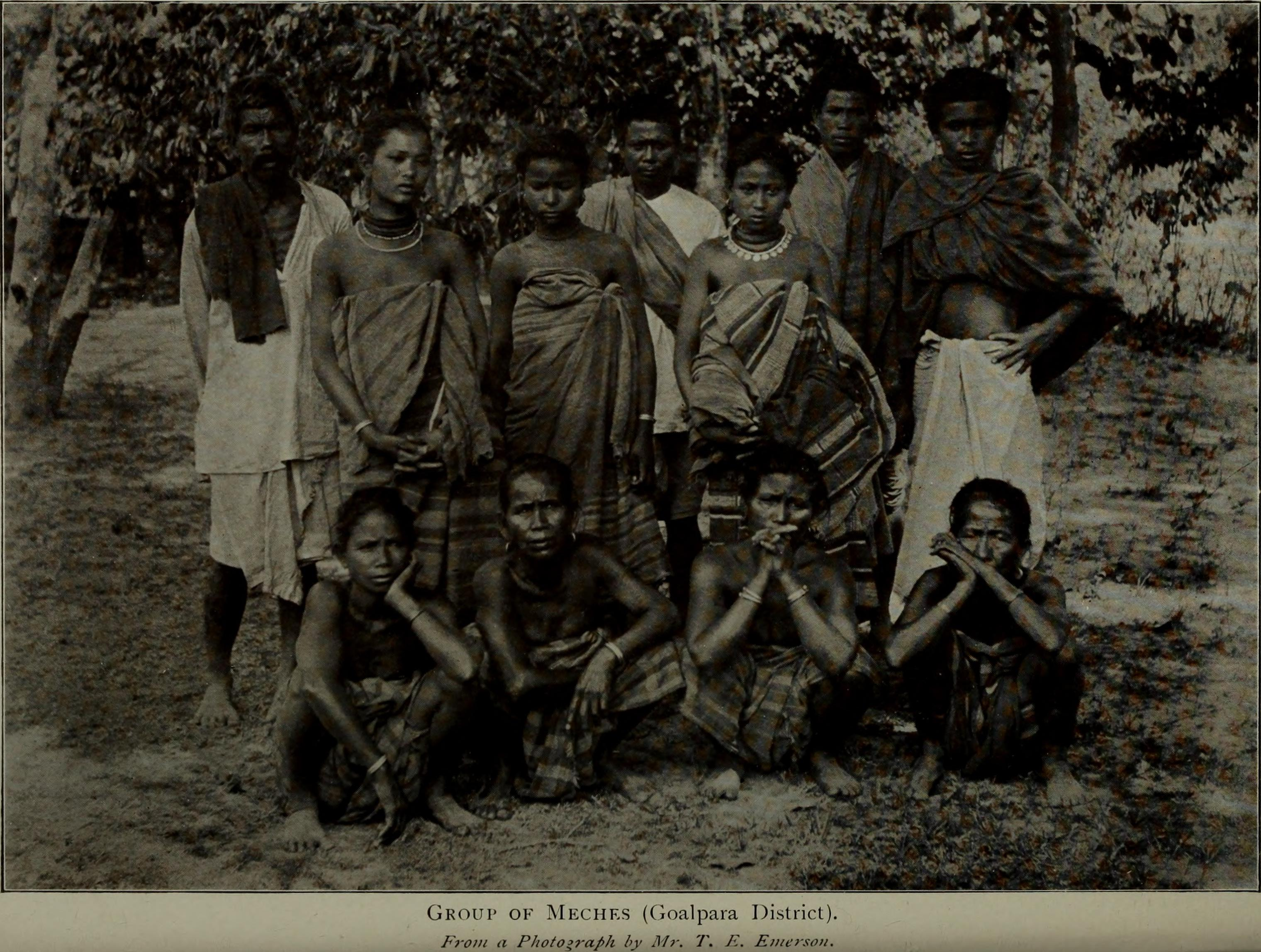
- A group of Meches, Undivided Goalpara district"; 1911

Total population
- 55,992 (2011 Census)

Regions with significant populations
- India • Nepal
- India: West Bengal: 41,242
- Assam: 9,883
- Nepal (Nepal): 5,193

Languages
- Boro

Religion
- Hinduism, Christianity

Related ethnic groups
- Boro, Koch, Dhimal

The Mech (spelled Meche in Nepal; pronounced /mes/ or /meʃ/) is an ethnic group belonging to the Bodo-Kachari group of peoples. It is one of the scheduled tribes of India, listed in the states of West Bengal and Assam, India. They also inhabit Nagaland in India as well as Nepal. (Note: "Mech Kachari community of Nagaland celebrates post-harvest festival", ANI News)

== Language ==
Meche or Mech language is western Boro dialect spoken in Jhapa district of Nepal and it belongs to Boro-Garo subgroup of Tibeto-Burman family. Though it's often considered similar to the eastern Boro dialects, the language, as spoken in Nepal and northern West Bengal, differs in significant ways.

== Etymology ==
It has been suggested that mech is probably a corruption of the Sanskrit word mlechchha. Nevertheless, Stuart N. Wolfenden observed that some people do self-designate as Mech, So, he reconstructed Mech from Tibeto-Burman root "mi" means "man". Other authors have speculated that Meche is derived from the Mechi River because the Bodo-Kachari peoples in Nepal had settled around it; Mecha a region of the Bod country; and descendants of Mechel a legendary figure of Nepal.

== Origin ==
The Bodo-Kachari peoples migrated into present-day India and gradually spread themselves throughout Assam, North Bengal and parts of East Bengal. It is said that during their migration to India, they marched towards different directions. One group went along the river Brahmaputra and established themselves in the whole of Assam up to Goalpara district as well as parts of Jalpaiguri district and Cooch Behar district under the name of Bodo or Boro. Another group went towards the West along the foot of the Himalayas up to the river Mechi, bordering India and Nepal and settled on the North bank of the river known as Mechi or Mechia. Later they spread to Darjeeling Terai, Baikanthpur in Jalpaiguri district again marched further East and settled in the Dooars. It is said that, a group of Mech people, again moved further East, crossed the Sankosh River, and went towards Goalpara in Assam. Due to repeated floods in Dooars and eastern bank of Teesta River, many families migrated towards Assam.

== History ==
The first record is found from the year 1205 A.D in Tabaqat-i Nasiri, where they are mentioned along with the Koch and Tharu and are found to inhabit between the country of Tibet and Lakhanawati (Gauda). In Persian history, these three groups of people, the Koch, Mech and Tharu, possessed the physiognomy of the Turks and the Mongols and their speech was different from the rest of the subcontinent. It is recorded that one Ali Mech, Mech chieftain, guided Bakhtiyar Khalji's army in his invasion of Tibet via Kamrup. 16th/17th century's Yogini Tantra states that Kuvacas were born of a Mech woman. According to Darrang Rajvamsavali of Koch kings and MS Chronicle collected by Buchanon Hamilton, Biswa Singha's father was a Mech and mother was a Koch. 19th and 20th century's scholars state that designation Mech is name applied to western section of Bodos by others and also to some extent by the people themselves.

== Distribution ==
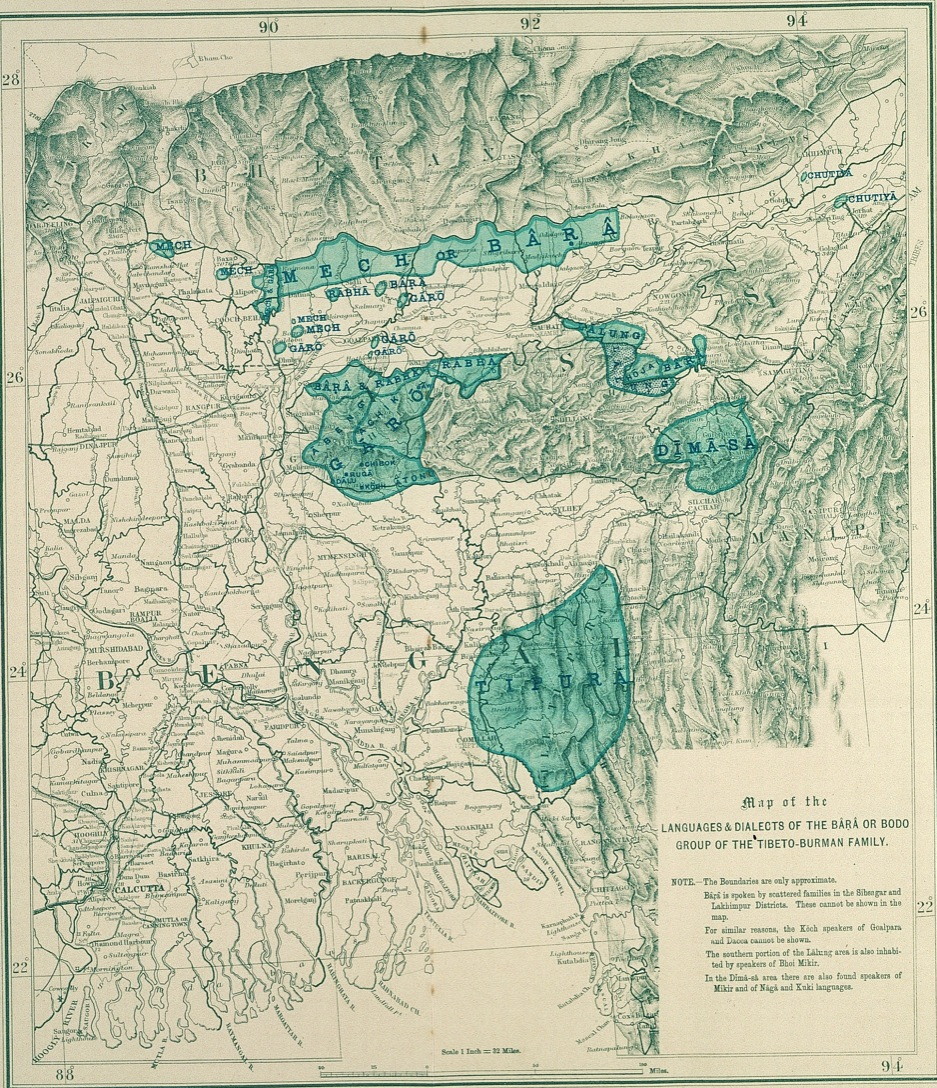
Distribution of Mech or Bârâ people, as reported in the Language Survey of India 1903

Mechs are found in West Bengal and Assam in India, and in Nepal.

== Demand of Mech-Kachari Autonomous Council ==
The Mech-Kacharis want to preserve their language, culture and uplift their economic status; and so they have been demanding a Mech-Kachari autonomous council for some time. (Note: "Mech-Kachari demands autonomous council", Assam Times)

== Mech people in Nepal ==
The Central Bureau of Statistics of Nepal classifies the Mech (called Meche in the Nepal census) as a subgroup within the broader social group of Terai Janajati. At the time of the 2011 Nepal census, 4,867 people (0.0% of the population of Nepal) were Mech. The frequency of Mech people by province was as follows:

- Koshi Province (0.1%)
- Bagmati Province (0.0%)
- Madhesh Province (0.0%)
- Sudurpashchim Province (0.0%)
- Gandaki Province (0.0%)
- Karnali Province (0.0%)
- Lumbini Province (0.0%)

The frequency of Mech people was higher than national average (0.0%) in one district only:

- Jhapa (0.5%)

== Notable people ==
- Abdon Mech
- Ali Mech
- Kalicharan Brahma
- Wilson Champramary

Religion among Meches
Religion	Percent
Hinduism	71.64%
Christianity	27.89%
Others	0.47%
