= Ali Mech =

Tribal chief in 13th century

- Tribal Commander
- Born: 12th century Kamata Kingdom
- House: Mech dynasty
- Religion: Sunni Islam
- Occupation: Senapati, Tribal Chief

Ali Mech was a tribal chief in the 13th century CE, in the region of present-day north of Bengal belonging to the Mech people. He is said to have helped Bakhtiyar Khalji during his Tibet campaign and converted to Islam under his influence.

== Biography ==
Ali Mech is considered the first Muslim convert in North Bengal. In the wake of Ali Mech's conversion to Islam, some Mech and Koch tribes also adopted the faith. The modern descendants of these converts are the Deshi people.

As a tribal chief in the foothills of the North of Bengal, he aided Bakhtiyar Khilji in his failed invasion of Tibet in 1206 by acting as a guide.

E. A. Gait mentions that he guided Bakhtyar Khalji march northwards along the right bank of the Karatoya river (present-day Bangladesh) for ten days, through a country inhabited by the Koch, Mech and Tharu (Terai) tribes.

Ali Mech supposedly bears a Muslim first name because he was fond of Islam and accepted it. Soon hundreds of Mech inhabitants converted to Islam as they were lightly exposed to Brahmanic culture, and were considered to be Yavanas or polluted outsiders by the Aryan Hindus lords as well as growing oppression in the hands of their Hindu lords and its caste system and traditions.
