= Goalpariya dialects =

Indo-Aryan dialects spoken in Assam, India

Goalpariya
- Goālpāriya
- গোৱালপাৰীয়া
- Native to: India
- Region: Western Assam
- Ethnicity: Deshi, Koch Rajbongshi, Rabha, Kalita, Nath-Jogi, Brahmin and other Assamese people
- Language family: Indo-European: Indo-Iranian; Indo-Aryan; Eastern; Bengali–Assamese; Goalpariya
- Dialects: Western Golapariya, Eastern Goalpariya
- Writing system: Bengali–Assamese script

Language codes
- ISO 639-3: –
- Glottolog: None
- Distribution of Goalparia dialects in pink.

Goalpariya is a group of Indo-Aryan dialects spoken in the Goalpara region of Assam, India. Along with Kamrupi, they form the western group of Assamese dialects. The North Bengali dialect is situated to its west, amidst a number of Tibeto-Burman speech communities. The basic characteristic of the Goalpariya is that it is a composite one into which words of different concerns and regions have been amalgamated. Deshi people speak this language and there are around 20 lakhs people.

== History ==
The Eastern Magadhi Prakrit gave rise to four historical dialects—Radhi, Varendri, Kamarupi and Vanga. The Kamarupi dialect gave rise to Indo-Aryan speeches of Brahmaputra valley, including Goalpariya, and the KRNB lects spoken outside Assam.

== Dialects ==
There are three identified dialects in this group: (1) Eastern, (2) Western and (3) Intermediate. Scholars from Assam associate these dialects with the Assamese language, Chatterji (1926) classifies Western Goalpariya with the North Bengali dialects and included them, East Goalpariya and Assamese in the Kamarupi branch, (Toulmin 2006) classes all Goalpariya dialects, including Eastern Goalpariya (Bongaigaon), in Kamatapuri lects and he also included them and Assamese in the Kamarupi branch.

Birendranath Dutta identifies three main dialects. One he classifies as Eastern Goalpariya, with a number of local variations: the variety around Abhayapuri and Goalpara towns forming one; and the speech around Krishnai, Dudhnai and Dhupdhara, with a large number of Rabha and Boro speakers, forming another. Locally, the varieties of Eastern Goalpariya are given names such as Habraghatiya, Bausiya, Namdaniya and Barahajari. Under Western Goalpariya, Dutta discusses two separate dialects: the variety around Gauripur (locally called Ghulliya); and the variety around Salkocha (locally called Jharua). Dutta considers the Salkocha dialect as the intermediate dialect.

== Region ==
The Goalpara region is the westernmost part of Brahmaputra Valley. It is bounded in north by Bhutan, on the east by Kamrup region, on the south by Garo Hills of Meghalaya and on the west by Cooch Behar district, Jalpaiguri district of West Bengal and Rangpur District of Bangladesh.

In ancient times it was included in Kamarupa. Subsequently, region formed a part of Kamata kingdom.

Later region became a part of the Kamata kingdom and later a part of Koch Hajo, the domain of Raghudeva and Parikshit Narayana, from 1581 to about 1615, when the Mughals took control over the region and constituted a Sarkar. The British received this region as the Diwani of Bengal in the 18th century, and it became a part of Colonial Assam in 1826.

== Background and controversies ==
The Goalpariya dialects have been subject of much controversy, primarily because they fall on a dialect continuum. In the 19th and early 20th centuries, there was a debate on whether they were dialects of Bengali or Assamese languages. The Irish linguist George Abraham Grierson claimed in his Linguistic Survey of India that the western and southern dialects were Rajbonshi, and thus a northern Bengali dialect; and that the eastern dialect was Assamese. Bengali linguist Suniti Kumar Chatterji also followed this classification in his thesis, adding western Goalpariya to the northern Bengali dialects. The debate never died down and authors continue to critically examine the nation building aspects of this debate.

Assamese scholars consider Goalpariya is a part of the Assamese dialects, specifically, a western Assamese dialect. The two erstwhile western districts of Assam, Kamrup and Goalpara, possess several local dialects. The Goalpariya dialect is similar to the Rajbonshi dialect which evolved under the Koch dynasty, and also similar to Bengali dialects spoken in northern Bengal. The differences between the eastern and western Assamese dialects are wide and range over the whole field of phonology, morphology and, not infrequently, vocabulary.

== Phonology ==
The dialects of Goalpara straddle the Assamese-Bengali language divides and display features from both languages. Though the phonemes in the eastern dialects approach those of Assamese, the western dialect approach those of Bengali. The distinctive velar fricative /x/ present in Assamese is present in the eastern dialect, but absent in the western dialect. The dental and alveolar distinction in Bengali are found in the western dialect, but merged into alveolars in the eastern dialect in consonance with Assamese. Further the aspirated /ch/ is present in Bengali as well as the western dialect, but absent in eastern Goalparia dialect and Assamese.

== Grammar ==
=== Gender ===
The nouns in Goalpariya language takes [i] or [ni] as suffix to indicate feminine gender. If the noun ends in a vowel, it replaces the vowel with [i], if in consonant it suffixes [ni] as feminine marker. For example,

Masculine	Meaning	Feminine	Meaning
chengr-a	boy	chengr-i	girl
bet-a	son	bet-i	daughter
daktar	doctor(m)	daktar-ni	doctor(fem)

=== Verbs ===
Verb: Kha (to eat)

==== Simple present tense ====
	singular		plural	
	word	meaning	word	meaning
1st person	mui kha-ng	i eat	amra kha-i	we eat
2nd person	tui kha-is	you eat	tumra kha-n	you eat
3rd person	oui kha-y	he/she eats	umra kha-y	they eat

== Folk community and culture ==
The people who speak this dialect, call themselves deshi, a dominant section, leaving out the Bodos, Rabhas, Mechs, Chawtals and other communities of the region. They call their dialect as deshi bhasa. A section of these people are known as Rajbongshi, which means men of royal descent who are Koch in origin. To trace the intermingling nature of this dialect, one can look its words. For example, the word kechha, meaning story, could have been derived from the Urdu word kissa and transformed itself into the Goalpariya dialect. The Urdu influence may be traced to the Mughal general, Mir Jumla, who, during his invasion of Assam, had pitched his military camp at Panbari in Dhubri district, probably due to the Panbari Mosque which was used by Muslim soldiers. Indeed, a section of the Mughals had settled in the district and the process of acculturation followed. There are many other Arabic, Persian and Urdu words in use in the Goalpariya dialect such as roshan, haram, nasta, chacha, chachi, bhabi, nana and nani. These are particularly used by the Muslim community who makes the major portion of population in the region.

== Folk song or Lokogeet ==
Goalpariya Lokogeet is a folk music of Goalpara, sung to traditional lyrics. It was primarily Pratima Barua Pandey, who raised the profile of this hitherto unknown genre of music nationally in India. Currently, albums of Goalpariya songs are released commercially; and Goalpariya musical motifs and instruments are increasingly used in popular music in India.

== Geo-physical conditions ==
There are some variations in the dialect as one move from one place to another which is not surprising as when there is a physical separation in terms of distance. According to Birendra Nath Dutta, the former president of the Asom Sahitya Sabha, the old district can roughly be divided into two zones, the eastern and the western, on the basis of variation in their dialects. The eastern zone is contiguous to the district of Kamrup and the western zone is closer to north Bengal. Thus, moi ahilo in Assamese becomes moiahilung in the eastern zone and moiasilong in the western zone. Moiahilung resembles the dialect of Kamrup district and differs a little from that of the west zone. As the eastern zone is close to Kamrup district, it could not keep itself aloof from the latter’s influence.

In this context, the following examples will serve to show that the dialect of these zones have many points in common with that of Kamrup.

Eastern Kamrup: 1. Api gila gharor para olaw 2. Bhal amta kaikhal
Western Kamrup: 1. Api gila gharar para ola 2. Bhal atmu kai khalak.

The western zone on the other hand, being contiguous to North Bengal, could not remain unaffected from the Bengali influence. For example, Bengali words such as matha (head), pakhi (birds) and Assamese words such as duar (door), chuli (hair), bihan (morning), which were used in early Assamese, are used by the people of Goalpara. There are some peculiarities in the dialect of Goalpara. For example, uyak aisa khaibe (he has to come), mok ei kamta or kajta kara khai (I have to do this work). Again, sometimes "L" becomes "N" in western dialect, such as lage becomes nage and lal becomes nal (red), infusing another difference in the dialect. In the Goalpariya dialect, expressions such as pet peta (rotten), tiktika (deep) are very common. The Maithili word angcha (garment), and Hindi words such as kawari (door) and damad (bridegroom) have directly entered into the Goalpariya dialect and are still found in the same form and carrying the same meaning.

== In popular culture ==
- Sonar Baran Pakhi is a Goalpariya language film.

== Bibliography ==
- Dutta, Birendranath (1995). "A Note on the Dialects of Goalpara". A Study of the Folk Culture of the Goalpara Region of Assam. Guwahati, Assam: University Publication Department, Gauhati University. pp. 281–301.
- Dutta, Birendranath (1973). "A Note on the Dialects of Goalpara" (PDF). A Study of the Folk Culture of the Goalpara Region of Assam (PhD). Guwahati, Assam: Gauhati University. pp. 423–453. hdl:10603/67892.
- Dutta, Birendranath (2003). "Non-Standard Forms of Assamese: Their Socio-cultural Role". In Miri, Mrinal (ed.). Linguistic Situation In North-East India (2nd ed.). Concept Publishing Company, New Delhi. pp. 101–110.
- Misra, Sanghamitra (2006). "Redrawing frontiers: Language, resistance and the imagining of a Goalparia people". The Indian Economic and Social History Review. 43 (2). Sage Publications: 199–225. doi:10.1177/001946460604300203. S2CID 143102568.
- Toulmin, Mathew W S (2006). Reconstructing linguistic history in a dialect continuum: The Kamta, Rajbanshi, and Northern Deshi Bangla subgroup of Indo-Aryan (Ph.D.). The Australian National University.
