= Sitajakhala Dugdha Utpadak Samabai Samiti =

Co-operative society

- Trade name: Sitajakhala
- Company type: Cooperative Society
- Founded: 1958
- Headquarters: Sitajakhala, Jagiroad, Morigaon district, Assam, 782413
- Area served: Middle Assam
- Key people: Ranjib Sharma (Chairman)
- Products: Pasteurized Milk, Dairy Products
- Website: https://sitajakhala.com

Sitajakhala Dugdha Utpadak Samabai Samiti (SDUSS), also known under Sitajakhala brand name is a cooperative milk producers' society based in Sitajakhala, Jagiroad, in the Morigaon district of Assam. Established in 1958, it is the only milk producers' cooperative society in central Assam.

Today, SDUSSL produces 15,000 liters of milk daily, with most of it being sold in the nearest towns and cities like Jagiroad, Morigaon, Nagaon and the capital Guwahati.

== History ==
The cooperative society is in an area where Gorkha or Nepali-origin people have been raising cattle since before Independence. After Independence, as the demand for milk increased, the community organized and collaborated to meet the market needs of nearby areas.

The society was formally established in 1958 by 17 members, including key figures like Nandalal Upadhaya and Sabilal Sharma, with the goal of eliminating middlemen from the milk trade and to create an organized marketing system for local milk producers, the society ensures that they receive fair prices for their products. They began with just 27 liters of milk from local cows. Nandalal Upadhaya faced significant resistance, including life threats from middlemen, as he worked to unite farmers.

In 1962, during the Chinese aggression, the society supplied milk to the Indian Army through the Central Dairy. Jersey cows were introduced in 1972 to boost production. On 14 November 2018, the society began distributing processed milk.

== Products ==
Sitajakhala produces various dairy products, including pasteurized milk, curd, ghee, paneer, butter, buttermilk, and lassi. These products not only meet local dietary needs but also support the economic sustainability of the cooperative.

The society launched milk products under the Gonand brand in 2015. However, it later discontinued this brand and began producing under the Sitajakhala brand.
