= Bhuragaon-Kaupati Bridge =

Bhuragaon-Kaupati Bridge ভূৰাগাঁও-কৌপাটি দলং
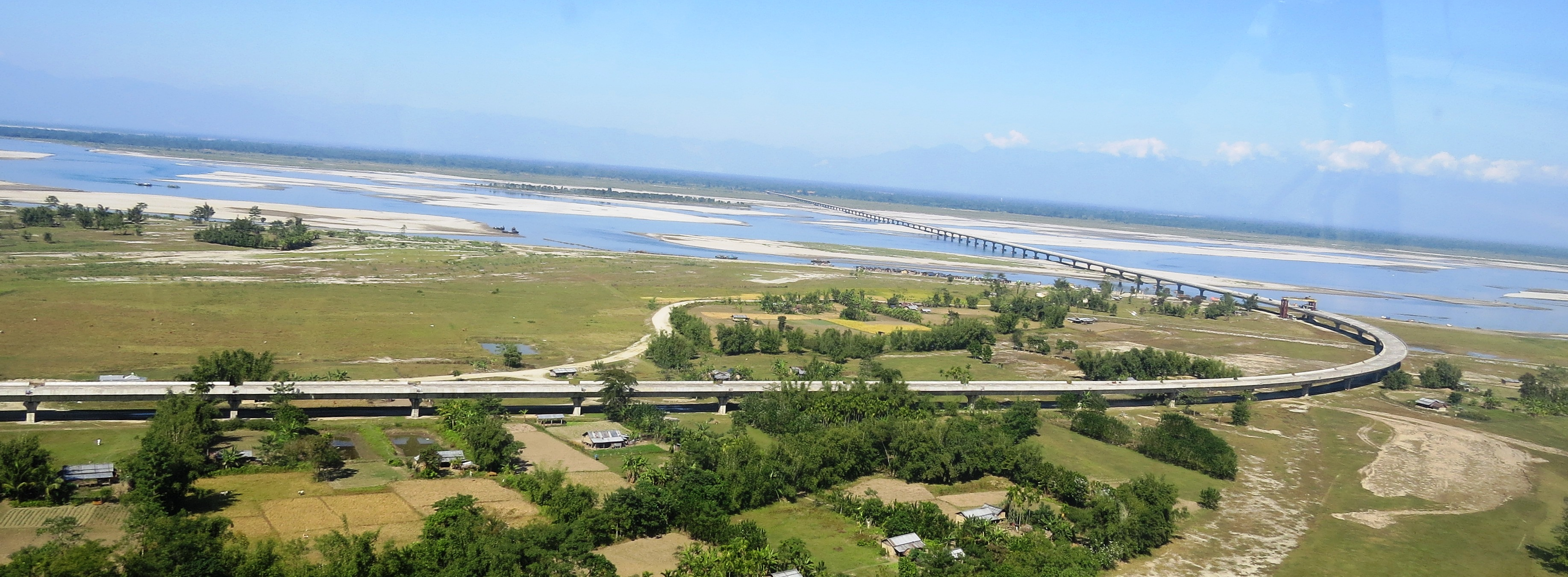
- Coordinates: 26°26′36.96″N 92°14′0.96″E
- Carries: Pedestrians, pipelines, automobiles, trucks
- Crosses: Brahmaputra River
- Locale: Darrang district and Morigaon District, Assam, India

Characteristics
- Design: Truss bridge
- Material: Steel, Concrete
- Total length: 7.63 kilometres (4.74 mi)

History
- Designer: NPEC Consultancy Private Limited
- Construction start: 2025

Bhuragaon-Kaupati bridge is a 7.63-kilometre-long (4.74 mi) proposed concrete road bridge on National Highway-715A (NH 715A) over the Brahmaputra River in Assam. It will connect Darrang district on the northern bank with Bhuragaon, Morigaon District on the southern bank.

== Location ==
The Bhuragaon-Kaupati Bridge will be situated downstream of the Brahmaputra River and will connect the town of Bhuragaon in the south to Darrang district to the river's north. The bridge will be located over 77 km away from the Assam-Bhutan border and acts as an alternative to the Kalia Bhomora Bridge and the under-construction Guwahati-North Guwahati Bridge.

== Connectivity ==
=== Road ===
It will connect at the junction of NH-27, at Jagiroad, at the South point. On the north side of the bridge from Balugaon, it will link to NH15 and it is will follow parallel to it until Rowta. From Rowta, it will extend to Samrang, near the Indo-Bhutan border.

=== Rail ===
Nearest railway station is Mairabari Railway Station. The distance between Bhuragaon and Mairabari is 22km. There was a passenger train, Guwahati - Mairabari Kolongpar Passenger (55603) from Mairabari Railway Station via the Haibargaon-Chaparmukh Line.

Another important railway station from Bhuragaon is Jagiroad. Which is situated approximately 42km south-west of Bhuragaon. The Guwahati-Lumding line of Indian Railway passes through Jagiroad Railway Station. Many intercity and passenger trains stop at this station.

After completing the bridge and the new National Highway-715A, the Rowta Bagan railway station will be accessible to people near the bridge.

== History ==
Several places named Khalingduar, Chari Duar and Chaiduar to the north of Mangaldai and Tezpur sub-divisions prove that these were the dwaram (roads) from the Himalayas and were used to travel to heaven in ancient times.The name of Darrang District originated from these ancient places called Dwaram or Dwar. it means Roads. There are still two roads to the mountains, through Khekheria Bagicha in the north of Mangaldai sub-division and near Bhairabkunda in the north of Udalguri District.

There was an ancient route from china along the course of the lohit river to Assam. Chinese records of about 248 A.D mentions a trade route from Yunnan, South China through hukong valley To Bhairabkunda, Udalguri District. The route from Lhasa took two months to reach Chounahat to Assam And they traded mainly in silk. This ancient route generally called seres-cirradoi Road or simply Indo-Tibet Silk Road.

According to Scholar Late Dineswar Sarma, the word Darrang came from Dawrang which means Gateway, As the traders from different parts of China, Tibet, Bhutan & Central Asia flocked to Assam through this route. Sir Edward Gate also mentioned a short-road from Odalguri to Tibet.

The Sharchops of Tashigang, Dundsan, Orong and Yangtse used to trade in a small Indian border town in Assam called Gudama (current day darranga or Darrangamela, better known as Mela Bazar).

== Current status ==
It is a halfway between Guwahati and Tezpur, and will reduce a 180-kilometre (110 mi) distance to 40 kilometres (25 mi). It will further connect Tawang and the eastern end of the East–West Arunachal Industrial Corridor Highway to South Assam.

The bridge will be built along with NH715A at a cost of Rs 3,706 crore. The total length of both will be 39 km, according to Office Memorandum Ref No. NH-15017/24/2024-P&M.

== Future ==
Further it will be connected to jomotsangkha via Samrang-Jomotsangkha Highway. Construction of the 58 km highway starts from Samrang to Rongchuthang in Jomotshangkha, Bhutan.

In addition to its practical benefits, the new bridge will significantly impact the social and cultural fabric of the region. It will bring the people of Morigaon district and Darrang district closer together, fostering cultural exchanges and enabling more frequent visits between the two districts. The bridge will also improve access to essential services such as healthcare and education, allowing both the district to share their resources more effectively.

== Importance ==
The new bridge will boost trade by making it easier for farmers in Morigaon, Darrang and nearby places to reach markets. It will also help small businesses grow by improving access to resources and customers. It will also enhance education and healthcare by making these services more accessible. Additionally, it will protect people from the severe floods along the Brahmaputra River each year.

This development will also boost tourism and defense in both the northeastern states of India and Bhutan. It is also important for India's defense against China. Because of its strategic location, it will be built to support the movement of tanks and aircraft.

== See also ==
- List of bridges on Brahmaputra River
- National Highway-715A
- Brahmaputra River
- Bhuragaon
- Morigaon District
