= Brahmaputra floods =

Flood events along the Brahmaputra river

The Brahmaputra floods refers to a catastrophic flood event that occurred in 2012 along the Brahmaputra River and its tributaries, as well as in subsequent years.

== 2012 ==
The 2012 Brahmaputra floods were an unprecedented flood event along the Brahmaputra River and its tributaries due to significant monsoon rains in India, Bangladesh, and Myanmar. 124 people were killed by the flooding and landslides, and about six million people were displaced. The worst hit area was the state of Assam in India. Flooding significantly affected Kaziranga National Park, where 540 animals died, including 16 rhinos.

In September 2011, the Brahmaputra River flowed through braided channels, but a year later, the channels could not be detected in the swollen river. During the monsoon season (June–October), floods are a common occurrence in India. Occasionally, massive flooding causes huge losses to crops, life and property. Deforestation in the Brahmaputra watershed has resulted in increased siltation levels, flash floods, and soil erosion in critical downstream habitat, such as the Kaziranga National Park in middle Assam.

Helicopters were deployed to drop food supplies to nearly 10,000 people in six villages where highway access was cut off by the flooding, about 550 km west of [Guwahati]

== 2013 ==
In 2013, the Brahmaputra River and its tributaries flooded, triggered by heavy rainfall at the end of June in the neighboring state of Arunachal Pradesh state through Brahmaputra river and its tributaries. This series of floods submerged 12 districts out of 27 in the state of Assam, where more than 1,00,000 people were affected. The flood also affected Kaziranga National Park and the Pobitora Wildlife Sanctuary where many animals moved to higher ground in order to save themselves from the flood. The floods also affected some of the northern districts of Bangladesh, where 100,000 people suffered from a scarcity of food and pure drinking water.

=== Flood report ===
According to Assam State Disaster Management Authority's flood report as of 13 July 2013 totally 12 districts out of the 27 districts in the state were affected, the districts are Bongaigaon, Chirang, Dhemaji, Golaghat, Jorhat, Kamrup, Karimganj, Lakhimpur, Morigaon, Nagaon, Sivasagar and Tinsukia.

In which 396 villages affected and around 7000 hectares of agricultural land were destroyed. Many roads and bridges were washed away cutting all road links to rest of the state. Eight relief camps have been set up in Dhemaji and Chirang districts where about 3,000 people have been given shelter. The flood victims claimed there were no river embankments at various places or those breached by earlier floods were not repaired.

== 2015 ==
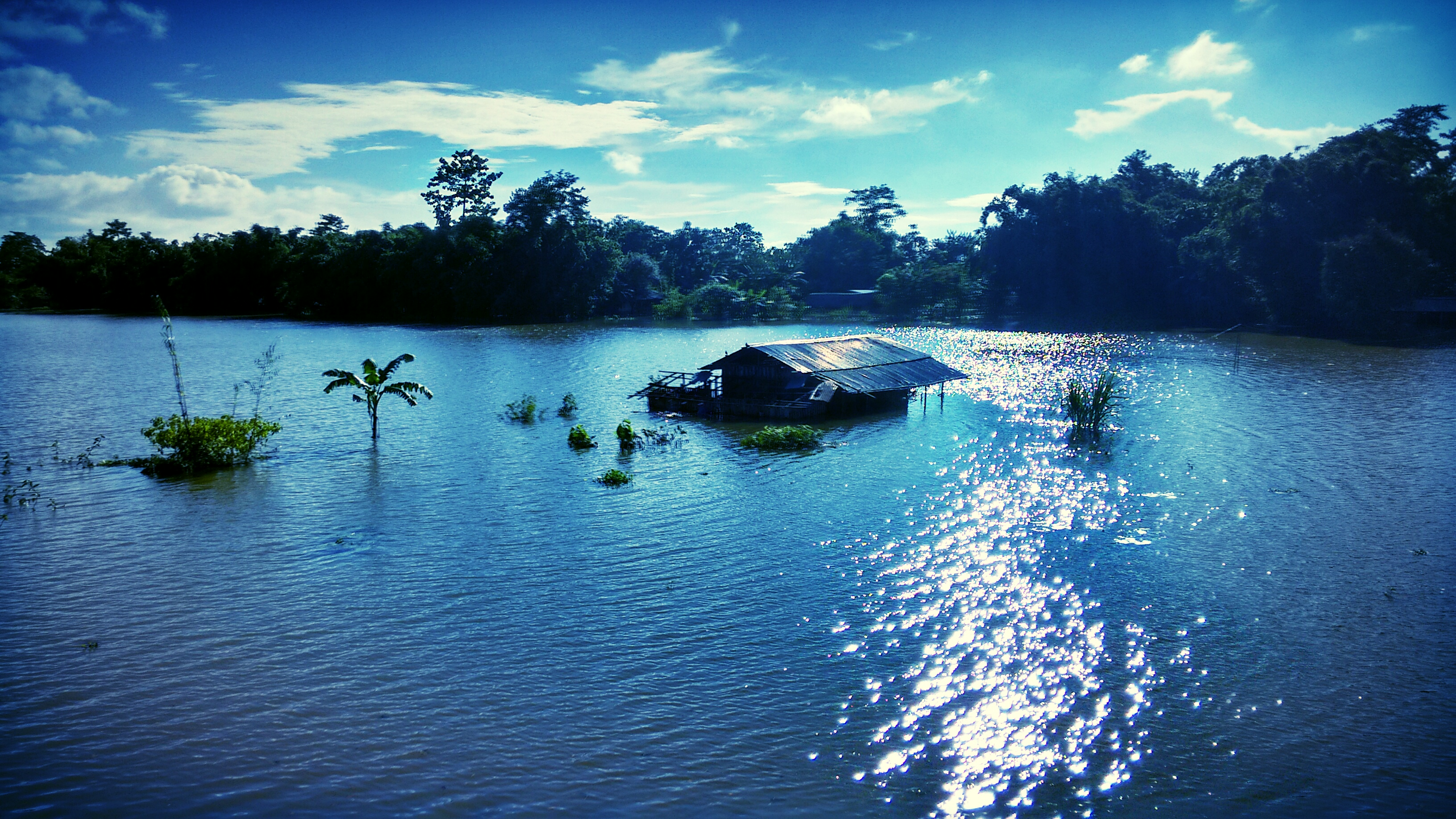
Assam flood in 2015

2015 Assam floods were floods in the Indian state of Assam which were triggered by heavy rainfall at the end of August in neighbouring Arunachal Pradesh state through Brahmaputra river and its tributaries. The floods are reported to have caused the deaths of 42 people and numerous landslides, road blockages and affected 16.5 lakh people in 21 districts.

Flooding affected 2,100 villages and destroyed standing crops across an area of 4,40,000 acres. In the Dhubri district alone, more than 400 villages are now almost impossible to reach making it difficult to send aid to the suffering civilians. However, this is not the first time the Assam state has experienced destructive flooding; the region is possibly India's most flood-prone state and has experienced at least 12 major floods since 1950. Although always prone to floods, the frequency of disastrous floods was increased in the area after the 1950 Assam-Tibet earthquake, also referred to as the "1950 Great Earthquake".

== 2016 ==
The state of Assam within India

The 2016 Assam floods were caused by large rains over the Northeastern Indian state of Assam in July 2016. The flooding had affected 18 lakh people, and flooded the Kaziranga National Park. As of 1 August 2016, 28 people had been killed as a result of the flooding starting 17 July, according to a report by the State Disaster Management Authority.

The north-eastern states of India saw heavy rainfalls in July 2016. The state of Assam faced around 60% more rains than it received in July 2015. The rainfall resulted in flooding of various rivers and on 5 July the Brahmaputra River had crossed its danger mark level in the seven districts of Lakhimpur, Dhemaji, Nagaon, Jorhat, Golaghat, Morigaon and Biswanath.

The floods have affected more than 16 lakh human lives, and people choose to abandon their households and livestock, and escape with help of homemade rafts. Mobile phone networks, along with power transmission, have been hampered in many regions of the state. Around 4,90,000 acres of farming land was affected by the floods. The Assam Branch Indian Tea Association (ABITA) has estimated a 21-30% crop loss of Assam tea. The state of Assam had produced 63.1 crore kg of tea in a year

=== Wild life ===
The Kaziranga National Park in proximity with the Brahmaputra River.

The floods have affected the Pobitora Wildlife Sanctuary and the Kaziranga National Park, a World Heritage Site. As of 2 August 2016, around 300 wild animals have been reported to have drowned, while around 81 percent of the Kaziranga National Park was under water. This includes 21 great one-horned rhinoceroses (Rhinoceros unicornis) and about 219 Indian hog deer (Hyelaphus porcinus). The park officially reported deaths of "11 wild boar, nine swamp deer, six sambar, three buffalo, two hog badger, one porcupine and one python" in the time span of 25 July to 31 July.

Officers and local people rescued 100 wild animals, including 9 rhinoceroses. These were taken for treatment at the Centre for Wildlife Rehabilitation and Conservation located within Kaziranga.

=== Rescue work ===
About 300 makeshift camps were erected to rehabilitate people displaced by the flooding. Various schools were used as relief camps. National Disaster Response Force took up the relief works. An NGO named "Save the Children" worked for the rehabilitation of children and their families in the three districts of Dhemaji, Lakhimpur and Majuli.

Seven public-sector oil companies Oil and Natural Gas Corporation, Indian Oil Corporation, Oil India Limited, Bharat Petroleum Corporation Limited, Hindustan Petroleum Corporation Limited, Gas Authority of India Limited, and Numaligarh Refinery Limited donated a total of ₹15 crore (US$1.6 million) towards Chief Minister's Relief Fund.

== 2017 ==
The state of Assam within India

The 2017 Northeast India floods were caused by overflowing of Brahmaputra river in the state of Assam in July 2017 affecting four Indian states: Assam, Arunachal Pradesh, Nagaland and Manipur. As of 14 July 2017, at least 85 people were dead as a result of the flooding, 4 lakh people were affected and 500,000 made homeless. Nearly 60 animals, mostly deer and wild boars, perished in the floods.

The flood-affected 15 districts of Assam state that includes Lakhimpur, Jorhat, Golaghat, Sivasagar, Cachar, Dhemaji, Karimganj, Sonitpur, Hojai, Biswanath, Majuli, Barpeta, Chirang, Nagaon and Nalbari. It has also inundated large tracts of Kaziranga National Park, Pobitora Wildlife Sanctuary and Nameri National Park.

=== Rescue work ===
The state government of Assam set up 128 relief camps under the surveillance of Assam Chief Minister Sarbananda Sonowal for people displaced, and made arrangements for drinking water, food and medical teams and rescue goods. 154 people died due to drowning, electrocution and diseases caused due to water contamination.

== 2018 ==
The 2018 Floods in the Tributaries of the Brahmaputra affected 4.5 lakh people across the districts of Dhemaji, Barpeta, Lakhimpur, Biswanath, Majuli and Dibrugarh in the state of Assam. According to the Assam State Disaster Management Authority (ASDMA), total 12 persons lost their lives in the first wave of flood in the year. The floods inundated 11,243 hectares of agricultural lands with standing crops in four districts.

== 2019 ==
The 2019 Brahmaputra Floods, till 16 July, affected a total of 52,59,142 people, 1,63,962.02 hectares of crop area, in 30 districts in the state of Assam. In the State, death toll rose to 59 on 20 July. At least 3,024 villages in the affected districts continued to be underwater and 44,08,142 people are hit in Dhemaji, Lakhimpur, Biswanath, Sonitpur district, Darrang, Barpeta, Nalbari, Chirang, Bongaigaon, Kokrajhar, Dhubri, South Salmara, Goalpara, Kamrup, Kamrup Metro, Morigaon, Nagaon, Karbi Anglong, Golaghat, Jorhat, Dibrugarh, Tinsukia, Cachar and Karimganj districts.

Notably, in this wave of floods, 2400 an endangered species of Indian rhinoceros in Kaziranga National Park were badly affected by the Flood.

Animals killed and rescued in Kaziranga National Park
Animal	Dead	Rescued
Rhino	12	2
Elephant	1	1
Hog Deer	101	49
Swamp Deer	6	2
Wild Bear	9	nil
Sambar	9	1
Others	3	5
Total	141	60

== 2020 ==
In 2020, floods were caused due to heavy rain in Assam and rising level of water in Brahmaputra. More than 30,000 were affected across 5 districts and crops were destroyed. The floods also coincided with the ongoing COVID-19 pandemic in India in Assam.

Till July, the floods along with landslides affected 1.6 million people in 22 districts of Assam and casualties rising to 33. 2 people died in Arunachal Pradesh due to landslide. Around 2,200 villages were under water and 87,000 hectares of crop area was damaged, The water level was above danger mark in several cities. More than 50 percent of the area of Kaziranga National Park and Pobitora Wildlife Sanctuary are affected by floods forcing animals to move to other places.

== 2022 ==
The floods in May, 2022 were caused due to above normal rainfall across the state. As of 25th May, more than 6 lakh people were affected and 25 have lost their lives. According to Assam State Disaster Management Authority (ASDMA), thousands of villages and more than 60,000 hectares (600 km^{2}) of crop area have been affected across the state. Authorities are running several relief camps and distribution centres across the state sheltering thousands of people.

Railway lines were also affected due to flooding and landslides.
