= Nagaon Paper Mill =

Paper making factory

- Company type: Paper manufacturing facility
- Industry: Paper industry
- Founded: 1985
- Founder: Hindustan Paper Corporation Ltd. (HPC)
- Headquarters: Kagaznagar, Jagiroad, Morigaon district, Assam, India
- Products: Newsprint, writing paper
- Parent: Hindustan Paper Corporation Ltd. (HPC)

Nagaon Paper Mill was a paper-making factory that was part of Hindustan Paper Corporation Ltd. and was established in 1985. It is located on National Highway 37 in Kagajnagar, Jagiroad, Morigaon district. It is located approximately 55 km east of Guwahati.

== History ==
The mill began commercial production in October 1985 and producing beyond its installed capacity until 2008. The mill production capacity was 300 metric tons of paper each day. Initially, 750 people from across the country were employed there. According to reports, Nagaon Paper Mill was the only unit of the corporation that remained profitable throughout its operation.

It is the first paper mill in the world to produce Kraft pulp in Kamyr Continuous Digester with 100% bamboo as raw material.

== Acquisition and redevelopment ==
It was one of two large HPC units that ceased operations due to its inability to pay its employees' salaries since 2017. The Assam Government purchased the assets of the unit, as well as those of the Cachar Paper Mill in the Barak Valley's Panchgram, for a sum of ₹375 crore.

The Assam Government has acquired more than 550 acres of the Hindustan Paper Corporation's paper mill, and plans to transform it into a business-oriented satellite township near Guwahati. The satellite townships would help ease the pressure on Guwahati, where the population has crossed an estimated 12 lakh.

== See also ==
- Kagaznagar, Assam
- Tata Electronics, Jagiroad
