= Patekibari =

Village in Assam, India

Religion
- Affiliation: Hinduism
- District: Morigaon district (Assam)
- Festivals: Raasleela, Dol Purnima

Location
- State: Assam
- Country: India

Architecture
- Completed: Mid 16th-century (Approx.)
- Inscriptions: Assamese

Patekibari is a village in Bhuragaon, Morigaon district of Assam, India, Popularly known as the birthplace of the great Assamese saint, scholar and reformer, Srimanta Sankardeva. Located approximately 18 kilometers from Morigaon town.

== Etymology ==
The soil of this place is loamy, therefore, the Barbhuyas brought pottery from the banks of the Kapili River and made "pottery", "pat nad", etc. The word "bori" means hill. It is believed that this is the origin of the name Patekibari.

It is written in the Guru Charit Katha that,

আহি বাহ্ৰেও ভূঞা আলচি বাৰে বৰ্ষ বহি উঠি পাৰ হৈ গ’ল : চাৰি হজকৈ আলি বান্ধি পুখুৰী খান্দি বহিল আলিপুখুৰী গ্ৰাম বোলে৷

== Birth of Sankardeva ==
According to historical records, Srimanta Sankardeva was born in 26 September 1449 in the village of Patekibari near present-day Bhuragaon in Morigaon district. He was born into the Shiromani Baro-Bhuyan family, with his father named Kusumbar Bhuyan and his mother Satyasandhya Devi. His early life was marked by tragedy, as he lost both of his parents at a young age; his father died when he was just seven years old. Following this loss, he was raised by his grandmother, Khersuti.

== Restoration ==
The Patekibari Than was abandoned for nearly four hundred years. In 1924, Bhudhar Kakati, the Mouzadar of Laharighat Mouza, took responsibility for restoring the shrine and received 50 bighas of tax-free land from the government in the shrine's name. At that time, the area was densely populated by Pamua Muslims due to the "line system" introduced by the government.

Laharighat Mouza was later divided, leading to the formation of Mairabari Mouza. According to the 1971 census, 80.59% of the population of Laharighat Than was composed of Pamua Muslims. In the late 1960s, Gopal Chandra Sharma, Deputy Collector of Dhing Revenue Circle, laid the foundation stone for a new building with the assistance of prominent individuals like Ratnakanta Barkakati and Chandrakant Barkakati.

The foundation stone was laid by Dr. Maheshwar Neog, and the newly constructed Manikut was inaugurated by Pitambar Deb Goswami, the Satradhikar of Garhmur, on 1 March 1961.
