= Jagiroad Dry Fish Market =

Locality in Assam, India

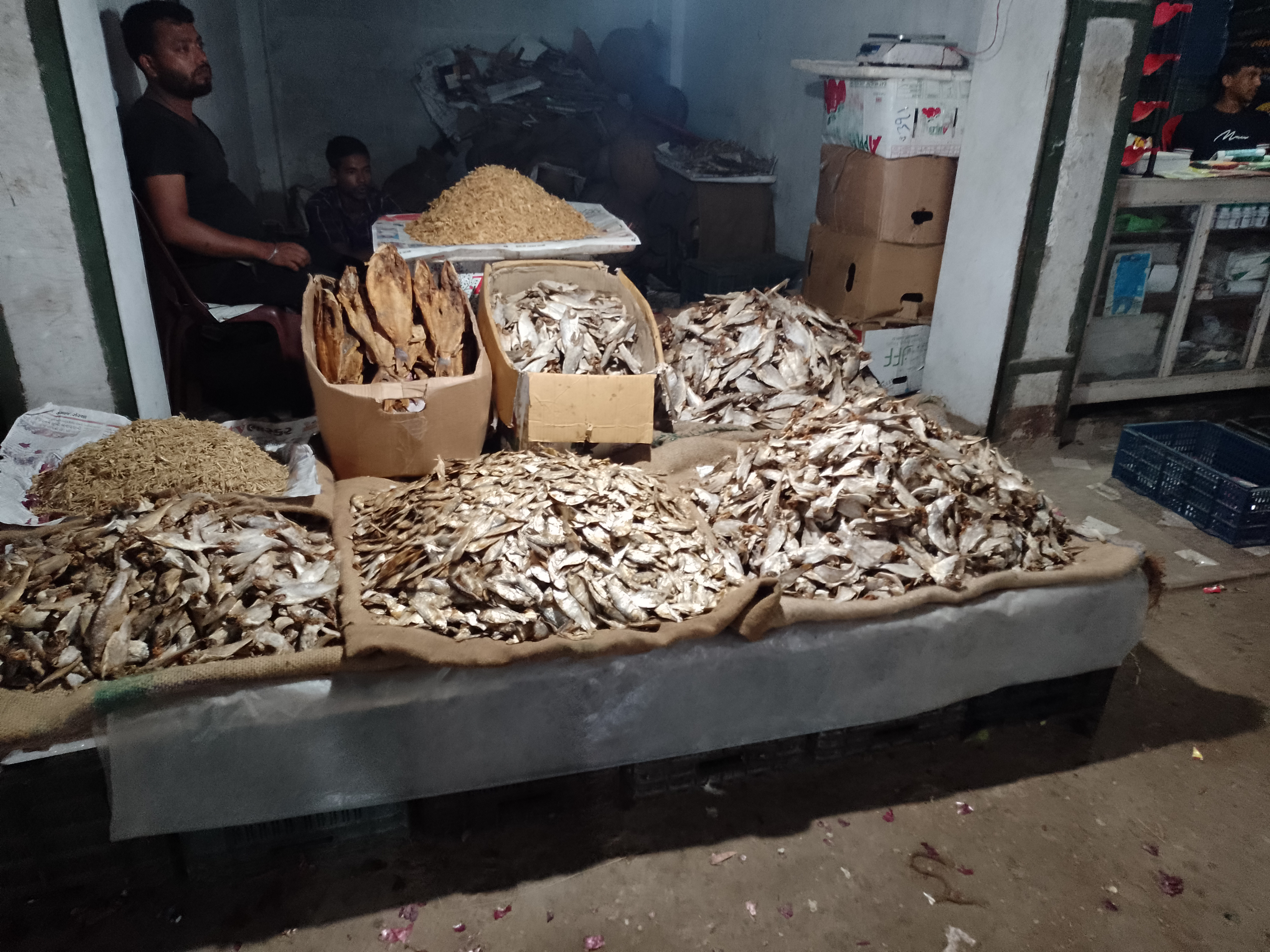
- A view of the Jagiroad Dry Fish Market
- Location: Jagiroad, Morigaon; Assam, India
- Opening date: 1940
- Goods sold: Dried fish from various regions

Jagiroad Dry Fish Market is the largest dry fish market in Asia, located in Jagiroad, Assam. It was established in 1940. Dried fish from this market is distributed to nearly all the North-eastern States and is also exported to Bhutan, Malaysia, and other South Asian countries.

== Location ==
It is close to the Jagiroad railway station, making it easy for vendors from places like Dimapur, Shillong, Agartala & Siliguri to do business there. The location is situated at a distance of approximately 50 km from Guwahati.

== Product ==
Jagiroad is known as the hub for fish culture, hatching, and production in Assam. This market receives a variety of fish from across India, including both sea fish and freshwater fish such as barb fish (puthi maas), bamla, and misa etc. The dried fish products available are either sun-dried or smoked.

Vendors in the market also offer over hundred types of dried fish, including popular ones like Goroi maas (Channa punctatus), Ari maas (Aorichthys seenghala), Puthi maas (Puntius siphore), and Rohu (Labeo rohita).

Sun-drying is a traditional preservation method that utilizes wind and solar exposure to remove moisture from fish. This process maintains product quality while establishing a distinct flavor and texture profile.

The process of dried fish includes several steps: drying, sorting, packaging, wholesaling, retailing, storing, and transporting.

== Trade ==
The supply chain of North East India revolves around the Jagiroad market. The market typically operates three days a week, Thursday, Friday and Saturday and sells approximately 500 tons of dried fish. There are near about 200 wholesale dry fish shops which are runs by local people. Around 25-30 percent of the local population depends on this market for their livelihood, directly or indirectly. The market turnover is around 40 Crore per annuum.

== Demand ==
Dried fish is a shelf-stable food source containing protein, fats, and minerals. Its flavor and aroma contribute to its use in various global cuisines.

Dried fish is also in high demand in China, Japan, and Korea. In these south Asian countries, it is used in various traditional dishes and cuisines, valued for its flavor and preservation qualities, like fish curry and spicy fish stew.

== Challenges ==
Recently, the market has struggled because of the new Goods and Services Tax (GST) on dried fish. Traders believe this tax is hurting their business. With higher costs and fewer imports from several areas, there are worries about whether the market can continue to operate.
