= Aruni Kashyap =

Indian writer and academic

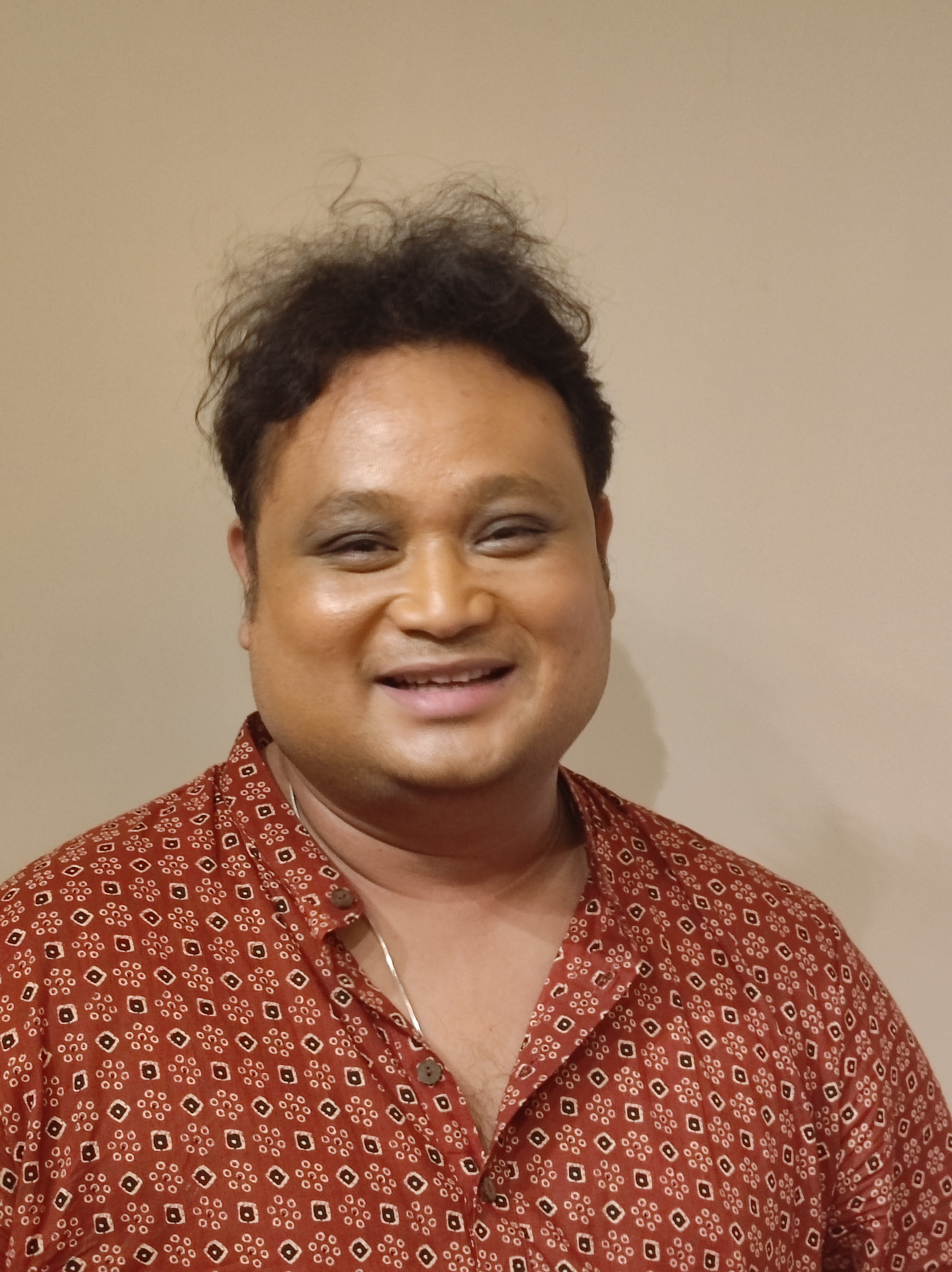
- Born: Assam, India
- Education: St. Stephen's College, Delhi; University of Edinburgh
- Occupations: Novelist, short story writer, poet, translator, academic
- Employer: University of Georgia
- Writing career
- Genres: Fiction, poetry, literary criticism
- Notable works: The House with a Thousand Stories; His Father's Disease
- Notable awards: National Endowment for the Arts Fellowship; Radcliffe Institute for Advanced Study Fellowship
- Website: arunikashyap.com

Aruni Kashyap is an Indian writer, translator, and academic from Assam, India. He writes in Assamese and English and translates from Assamese. His works have appeared in publications such as The New York Times, Boston Review, The Guardian, and The Hindu, and have won several awards. He is an associate professor of English and the Director of the Creative Writing Program at the University of Georgia.

Kashyap is known for his novel The House with a Thousand Stories (2013) and the short story collections His Father's Disease (2019) and The Way You Want to Be Loved (2024). His work often explores the political conflicts of his home state of Assam, focusing on themes of insurgency, identity, and displacement.

== Career ==
Kashyap writes in both English and Assamese. His debut novel, The House with a Thousand Stories, was published by Viking in 2013. The novel, set in Mayong in rural Assam, explores the impact of the insurgency in Assam on the daily lives of its characters against the backdrop of a family wedding. It received critical attention, with reviewers noting its sensitive portrayal of a region often overlooked in mainstream Indian literature.

His collection of short stories, His Father's Disease, was published in 2019. The stories are set in both Assam and the United States, examining themes of cultural misunderstanding, identity, sexuality, and the immigrant experience. His poetry collection, There Is No Good Time for Bad News, was published in 2021. It was nominated for the Georgia Author of the Year Awards and was a finalist for the Marsh Hawk Press Poetry Prize and the Four Way Books Levis Award in Poetry. He has also published short fiction, essays, and poetry in various literary journals, including The Kenyon Review, The New York Times, and The Boston Review.

As a translator, Kashyap has translated Indira Goswami's The Bronze Sword of Thengphakhri Tehsildar and Anuradha Sarma Pujari's My Poems Are Not For Your Ad-Campaign.

Kashyap is an associate professor in the Department of English and serves as the Director of the Creative Writing Program at the University of Georgia in Athens, Georgia.

== Themes and style ==
Kashyap's fiction is noted for its focus on Assam and Northeast India, a region he has stated is often misrepresented or ignored in global and Indian narratives. He frequently incorporates elements of the region's political history, including insurgency and state violence, into the personal lives of his characters. In an interview with The Offing, he discussed the importance of writing about his home region: "It is true that since I am from a space that is so little depicted in Indian English fiction and doesn't feed into the existing ideas of India [...] some agents and editors have been befuddled."

His work also explores issues of queer identity, diasporic experience, and cultural dislocation. His writing style has been described by critics as straightforward and evocative. He has mentioned borrowing from Assamese idioms and storytelling techniques to "[expand] the possibilities of English."

== Awards and recognition ==
Kashyap has received several fellowships for his work. He was awarded a National Endowment for the Arts Fellowship in 2023 to support the translation of the Assamese novel The Illuminated Valley by Dipak Kumar Barkakati. In 2024, he was named a Carl and Lily Pforzheimer Foundation Fellow at the Radcliffe Institute for Advanced Study at Harvard University. He has also received the Charles Wallace India Trust Scholarship for Creative Writing, which supported his studies at the University of Edinburgh. His translations have been shortlisted for the 2023 and 2024 Armory Square Prize and a 2024 Valley of Words Book Award.

== Selected works ==
=== Novels ===
- The House with a Thousand Stories. Viking. 2013. ISBN 978-0-670-08695-5.
- Noikhon Etia Duroit নৈখন এতিয়া দূৰৈত (in Assamese). Panchajanya Books. 2019.
- How to Date a Fanatic. HarperVia. 2026. ISBN 9780063443785.

=== Short story collections ===
- His Father's Disease: Stories. Westland Books. 2019. ISBN 978-93-88754-58-3.
- The Way You Want to Be Loved: Short Stories. Gaudy Boy. 2024. ISBN 978-1-958652-08-4.

=== Poetry ===
- There Is No Good Time for Bad News. FutureCycle Press. 2021. ISBN 978-1-952593-06-2.

=== As editor ===
- How to Tell the Story of an Insurgency: Fifteen tales from Assam. HarperCollins. 2020. ISBN 978-93-5357-653-0.

=== Translations ===
- The Bronze Sword of Thengphakhri Tehsildar by Indira Goswami (Zubaan Books, 2013). ISBN 978-93-81017-08-1.
- My Poems Are Not for Your Ad-Campaign by Anuradha Sarma Pujari (Penguin Random House, 2023). ISBN 978-0-670-09681-7.
- An Illuminated Valley by Dipak Kumar Barkakati (Penguin Random House, forthcoming)
- Ten Love Stories and a Novella of Despair by Anuradha Sarma Pujari (Westland Books, forthcoming)
