= Kagaznagar =

Kagaznagar may refer to:

- Kagaznagar, Assam
- Kagaznagar, Telangana
