= His Father's Disease =

2019 short-story collection by Aruni Kashyap

- Author: Aruni Kashyap
- Language: English
- Genre: Fiction
- Set in: Assam, Minnesota
- Published: 2019
- Publisher: Westland Books
- Publication place: India
- Pages: 184

His Father's Disease is a collection of ten short stories written by Aruni Kashyap. It was published in 2019 by Westland Books. The stories, set in rural Assam and Minnesota, explore the themes of political violence against women, queer identity, homesexuality, and intercultural experiences—themes overlapping with Kashyap's debut novel The House with a Thousand Stories.

In 2024, an updated short-story collection containing three additional stories was published in the US by Gaudy Boy under the title of The Way You Want to Be Loved.

== Reception ==
His Father's Disease received positive reviews. Gunjana Dey writing for The Huffington Post praised Kashyap for "tread[ing] on uncharted territory…and examining the idea of home." The stories move back and forth between the day-to-day life of midwestern America to the fraught regions of Assam connected with "characters who intentionally and unintentionally don’t fit the norm, who push against the urge to generalise—and the urge to dismiss," notes a review by Namrata Kolachalam writing for Helter Skelter (magazine).
