= Jagiroad =

Jagiroad জাগীৰোড
- Town
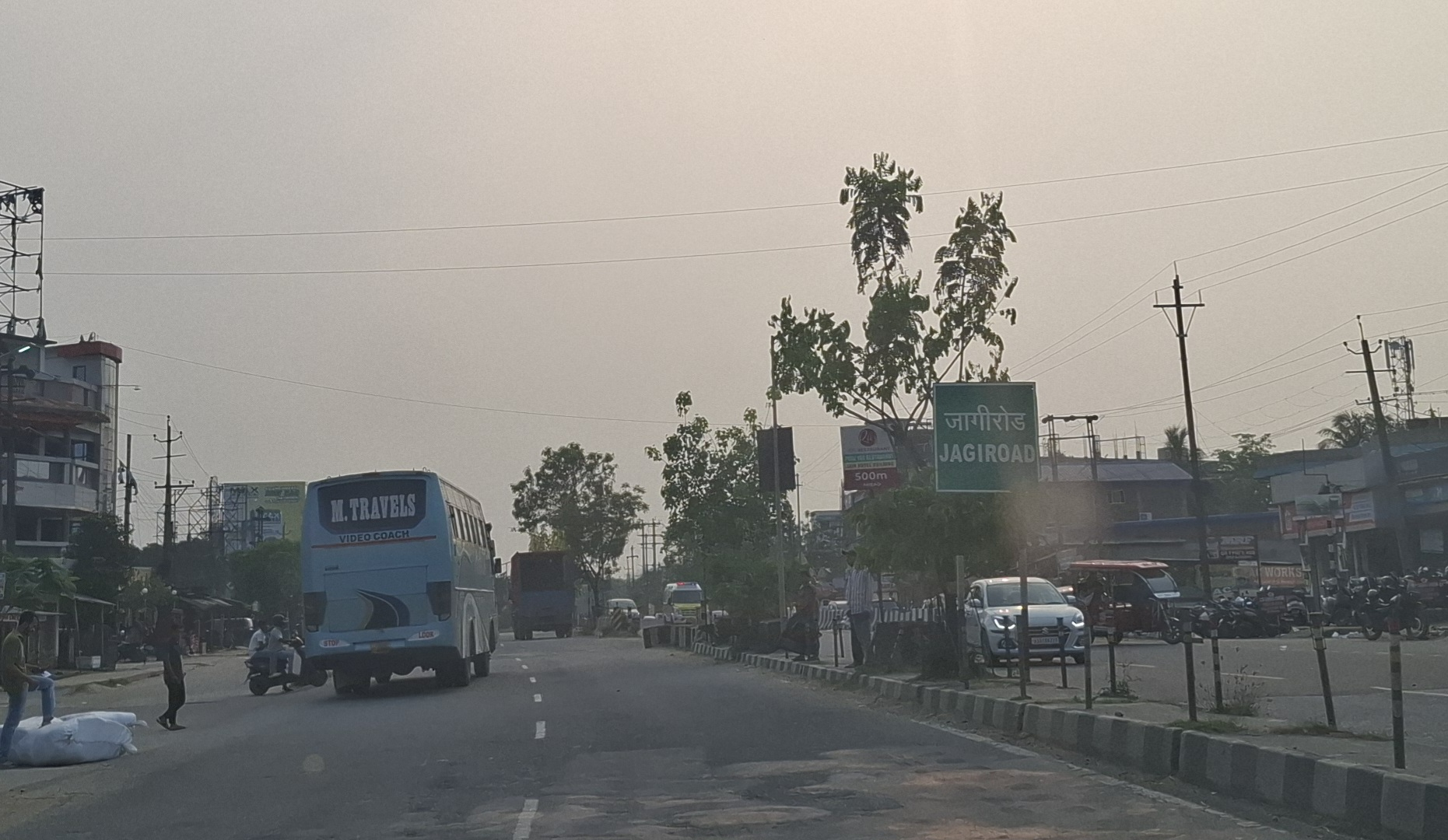
- Highway in Jagiroad

- Location in Assam, India Jagiroad (India)
- Coordinates: 26.207815°N 92.406006°E
- Country: India
- State: Assam
- District: Morigaon

Population (2026)
  - Total: 26,400

Languages
  - Official: Tiwa and Assamese
  - Most spoken language: Assamese
- Time zone: UTC+5:30 (IST)
- PIN: 782410
- Telephone code: +913678
- Vehicle registration: AS 21

Jagiroad is a town in the state of Assam. It is located on the south bank of the Kolong River, in the Mayong Subdivision of Morigaon district.

== Etymology ==
It was earlier known as Nakhola, but in British Rule of India, it was changed due to frequent confusion with the name Noakhali of Bangladesh

In medieval times, there was a war between the Kacharis and Jungal Balahu. He was defeated and forced to retreat. The place where he stopped to drink the water of the Kolong river, later became known as Raha. The place where he jumped into the Kolong and escaped is called Jagi and the road to Jagi, a place in Morigaon, passes through this place. Thus, the place known as Jagiroad.

Another theory suggests that the name may have originated from the word Jaglau, which means impossible or improbable in Dimasa Language. This theory is based on the belief that the area was once known for its cultural and intellectual activities, and the name Jagiroad may have been a reflection of this. Regardless of the origin, the name Jagiroad has become an integral part of the town's identity and history.

== Geography ==
Jagiroad is a town located in the Morigaon district of Assam, India. It is situated on the southern bank of the Brahmaputra River, approximately 55 kilometers east of the city of Guwahati.

The town has an elevation of around 52 meters above sea level and is situated in a region that is characterized by low hills and valleys. The area is part of the Brahmaputra Valley, which is known for its fertile alluvial soil and is one of the most productive agricultural regions in the country.

== History ==
The town has a rich history that dates back to ancient times. The area was once inhabited by various tribes and communities, including the Tiwas, the Kacharis, and the Karbis. In the medieval period, Jagiroad was part of the Tiwa kingdom, which was ruled by the Tiwa dynasty.

Bhimsingh’s writings provide valuable insights into the past of the present-day Morigaon town and its surrounding areas. In earlier times, this region was under the rule of six independent monarchs. During this era, two princes from Darrang, Supradhvaj and Makardhvaj, fled their native land due to internal strife. They crossed the vast Brahmaputra River and settled in Bahakajari. Supradhvaj eventually married the daughter of Mangalsingh, the ruler of Baghara. Following this marriage, Supradhvaj was appointed as the seventh ruler of the area, establishing his own autonomous kingdom.

During the colonial period, Jagiroad was an important center for tea cultivation and trade. The British established several tea gardens in the area, which led to the growth of a tea-based economy. In addition to tea, the area was also known for its jute and silk industries.

Jagiroad also played an important role in the Assam Movement, which was a popular movement in the 1970s and 1980s that sought to protect the rights of the indigenous people of Assam. The town was a center of protests and demonstrations during this period.

== Demographics ==
As of 2011 India census, Jagiroad had a population of 17,739. Males constitute 52% of the population and females 48%. As of 2011 census there are 920 females per 1000 male in the census town. Jagiroad has an average literacy rate of 87%, male literacy is 91%, and female literacy is 74%. In Jagiroad, 10.3% of the population is under six years of age.

Total geographical area of Jagiroad census town is 12 km^{2}, and it is the biggest census town by area in the sub district. Population density of the census town is 1431 persons per km^{2}. There is only one ward in this census town which is Jagiroad Ward No 01.

Jagiroad has 37% (6485) population engaged in either main or marginal works. 60% male and 11% female population are working population. 55% of total male population are main (full-time) workers and 5% are marginal (part-time) workers. For women 7% of total female population are main and 4% are marginal workers.

=== Language ===
Languages spoken in Jagi Road (2011)
1. Assamese (46.3%)
2. Tiwa (34.5%)
3. Hindi (13.5%)
4. Bengali (2.44%)
5. Nepali (1.63%)
6. others (1.68%)

Assamese is the most spoken language at 8,217 speakers, followed by Tiwa at 6,112, Hindi is spoken by 2,392 people, and Nepali at 269.

== Politics ==
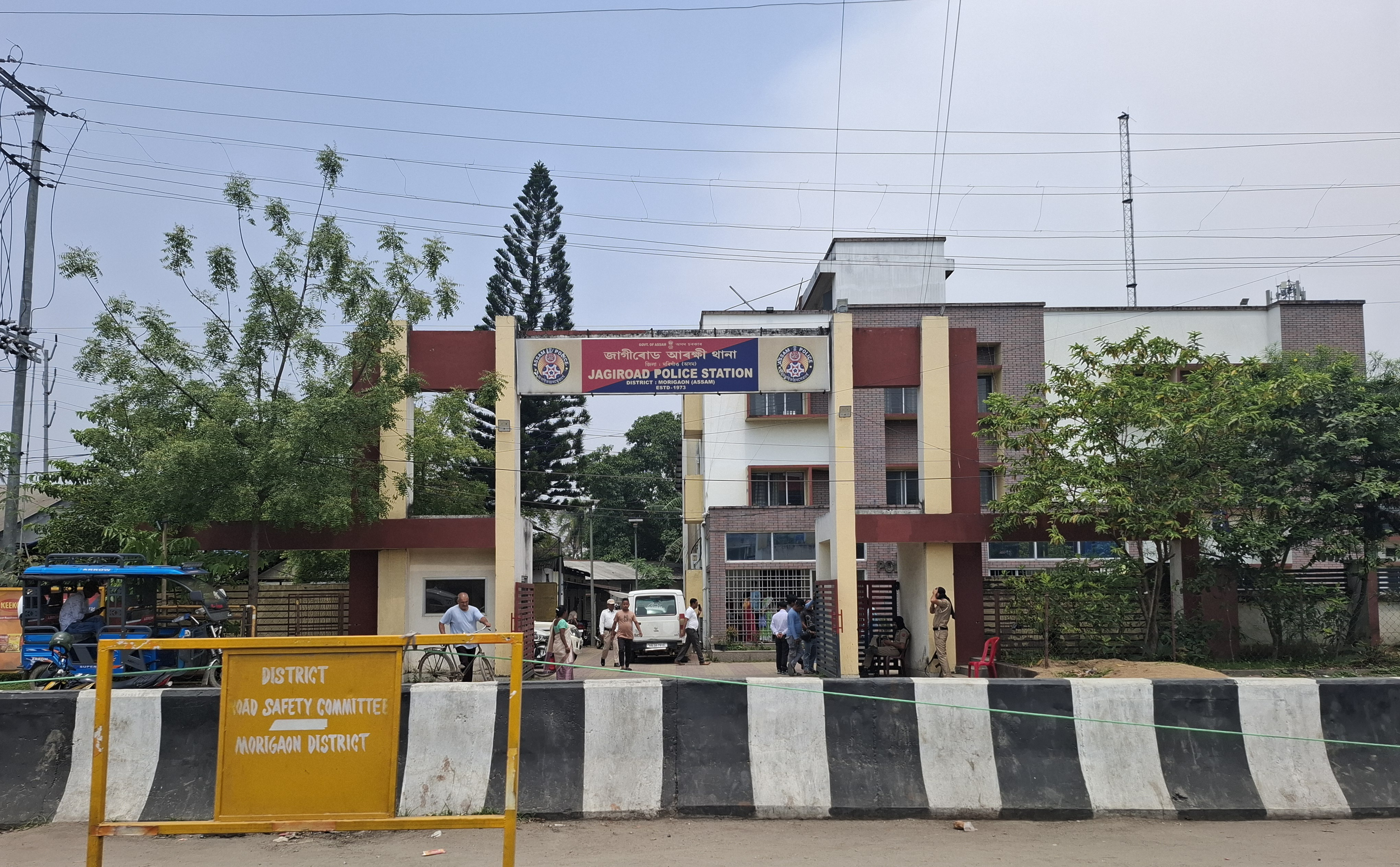
Jagiroad Police Station

Jagiroad is an assembly constituency in the Morigaon district of Assam, India. It is a reserved seat for the Scheduled Caste category. The current MLA for Jagiroad is Pijush Hazarika of the ruling Bharatiya Janata Party (BJP).

The Jagiroad constituency is part of the Nowgong (Lok Sabha constituency). The current MP for Nowgong is Devasish Sharma of the BJP.

== Transport ==
=== Road ===
National Highway 27, also known as AH 1 (Asian Highway 1), was built under the major East-West Corridor project of India’s National Highways. It starts in Porbandar (Gujarat) and ends in Silchar (Assam), passing through Jagiroad and connecting to the state capital, Guwahati (Dispur). It will also be linked to the newly proposed Guwahati Ring Road project. as the area falls under Assam State Capital Region. It is also connected with Morigaon by another National Highway, i.e., NH-715A, with plans to extend it up to Bhutan via Morigaon and Bhairabkunda to connect Central Assam to Bhutan.

There is also a road in Jagiroad that leads to Meghalaya. In 2025 it was reported that construction for the Umsning-Jagiroad highway would commence soon. The Umsning to Jagiroad Highway is a significant roadway that begins at the 51 km mark of NH-6 in Umsning and stretches to Umsiang village on the Assam–Meghalaya border, covering a total distance of 80 km. The upgrade of this road is part of the Meghalaya Integrated Transport Project (MITP) and is funded by the World Bank.

=== Rail ===
Jagiroad railway station is a double line fully electrified railway station which falls under NSG-5 category located in Station Road, Jagiroad town in Morigaon district, Assam, India. It is an important railway station, falls under the Guwahati-Lumding section of the Northeast Frontier Railway. The station constitutes with two railway platforms with a capacity to hold 22 coach railway rakes. Many long distance, intercity and passenger trains have stoppage in this station.

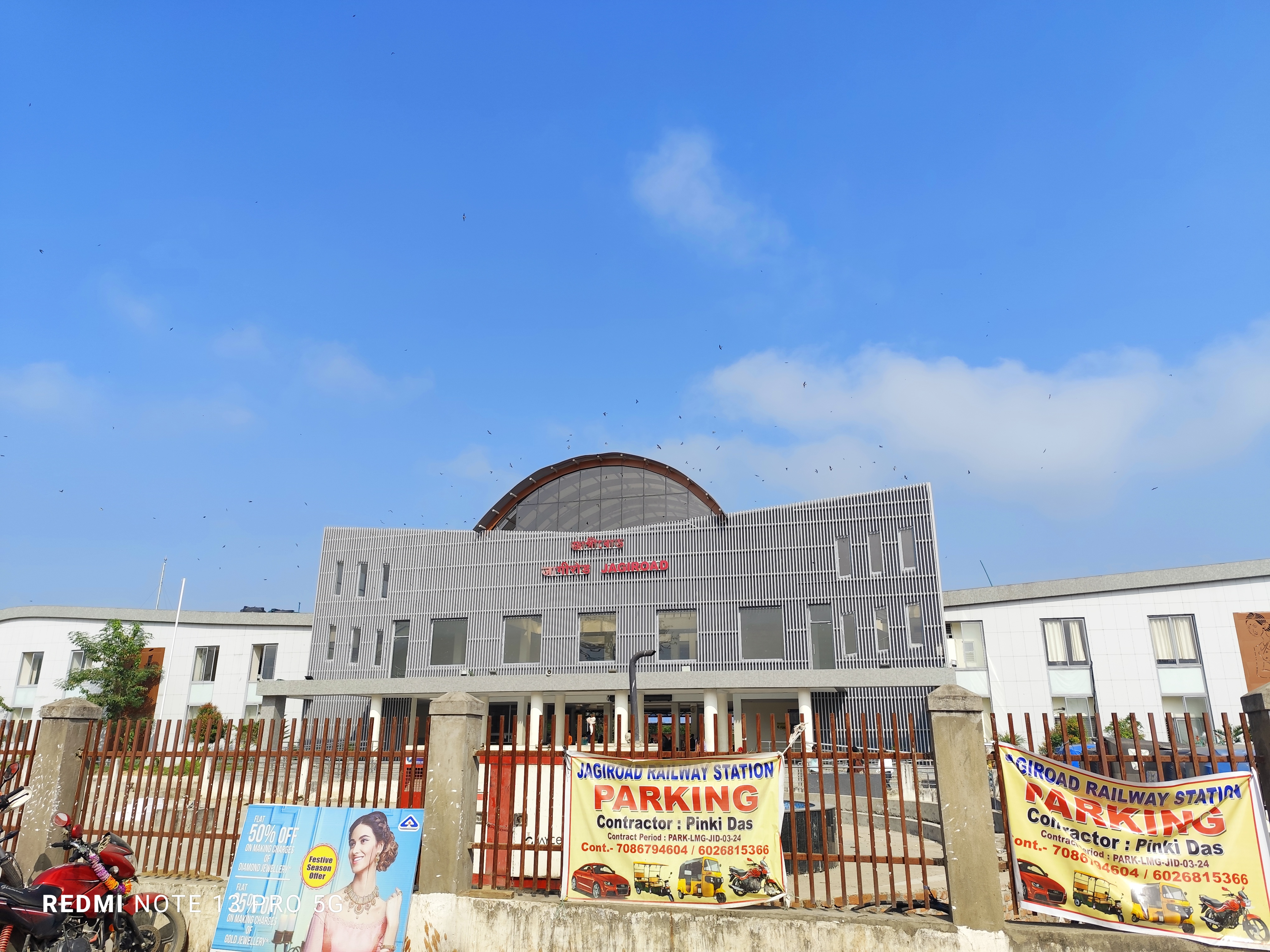
jagiroad railway station

The station serves as a transportation hub for the local community and facilitates rail travel within the Morigaon District. The station offers amenities such as parking, waiting rooms, retiring rooms, toilets, a multipurpose stall, RO drinking water, and an RPF complaint booth etc.

== Education ==
=== Colleges ===
- Jagiroad College
- Jagiroad Junior College
- Sriniwas Junior College

=== High schools ===
- Jyotiniwas High School
- Vinayak Academy
- Indus Academy
- Shankardev Vidya Niketan, Jagiroad
- Bapuji High School
- Jagiroad Higher Secondary School
- N. F. Railway High School
- Sahid Lakhi Deka Higher Secondary School
- Kendriya Vidyalaya, Jagiroad
- Jagiroad Girl's High School
- HPC High School
- Nalanda Academy

=== Lower primary schools (Prathamik Vidyalaya) ===
These schools provide education up to standard for:

- Jagiroad Hindi Prathmic Vidyalaya
- Ghunusa Habi Prathamik Vidyalaya
- Nokhula Grant Prathamik Vidyalaya
- Bishnu Rava Nimna Buniyadi Prathamik Vidyalaya
- Tarak Chandra Prathamik Vidyalaya
- Indira Nagar Prathamik Vidyalaya
- Bhanu bidya mandir
- Century Play School
- Bachpan Pre-School
- Kidzee
- Tegheria L.P. School
- Guripathar L.P. School
- Markang Kuchi L.P. School

== Industry ==
Jagiroad, located in the Morigaon district of Assam, is primarily known for its industrial activities. The Nagaon Paper Mill, which was one of the largest units of the Hindustan Paper Corporation, was situated in this town. The town also has several other small and medium-sized industries, including fertilizer manufacturing, a cement grinding unit, Railneer water bottling, a railway concrete sleeper workshop, and a furniture-making unit using bamboo pulp.

In addition, there are several small-scale agro-based industries, such as rice mills and oil mills, dairy etc that cater to the local agricultural produce. Overall, Jagiroad's industrial sector plays a significant role in the region's economic development and provides employment opportunities for many people.

=== Tata Semiconductor Assembly and Test Facility ===
Tata Semiconductor Assembly and Test Facility is an upcoming India's first Indigenous and greenfield semiconductor assembly and test facility in Jagiroad.

=== Nagaon Paper Mill ===
Nagaon paper mill was a paper-making factory that was part of Hindustan Paper Corporation Ltd. and was established in 1985. It is located on National Highway 37 in Kagajnagar, Jagiroad, Morigaon district. It is located approximately 55 km east of Guwahati.

It is the first paper mill in the world to produce Kraft pulp in Kamyr Continuous Digester with 100% bamboo as raw material. another of the two large HPC units ceased operations due to its inability to pay employees' salaries since 2017.

=== Assam Spun Silk Mill ===
Assam Spun Silk Mills Ltd was a public limited company located in Jagiroad, Assam, India. Incorporated on March 31, 1962, the mill was established to promote silk production in the region. It specialized in producing spun silk and played a crucial role in the local textile industry.

=== Sitajakhala Dugdha Utpadak Samabai Samiti ===
Sitajakhala Dugdha Utpadak Samabai Samiti Limited is a cooperative milk producers' society based in Amlighat, Jagiroad, Morigaon district, Assam. It is the only milk producers' cooperative society in central Assam. Established in 1958, the society was formed to provide a structured marketing system for local milk producers, ensuring they receive fair prices for their products.

=== Alsthom Industries Limited ===
Alsthom Industries Limited (Subsidiary of Dalmia Cement Bharat Limited) is a 1000 TPD Cement grinding unit that was established in 2016 which is situated at Baghjap, Jagibhakatgaon in Jagiroad-Marigaon Road. It produces Cements with different grades and supplies across the states and also exports.

=== Jagiroad Dry Fish Market ===
Jagiroad Dry Fish Market is the largest dry fish market in Asia. The products of this market are distributed to north-eastern states - Nagaland, Mizoram, Manipur, Meghalaya and Arunachal Pradesh. The supplies are also exported to nearby countries such as Bhutan, Malaysia, Singapore and other South East Asian countries.

== Tourist places ==
- Mayong : Mayong, situated roughly 30 Km from Jagiroad, is a historically renowned for its association with black magic, sorcery and local folklore, including legends of mysterious magical practices and people disappearances. With a rich cultural heritage, Mayong is also linked to the Mahabharata through characters such as Ghatotkacha.
- Pobitora Wildlife Sanctuary : Pobitora Wildlife Sanctuary is a protected area in Morigaon District of Assam, known for having world's densest population of Indian one-horned rhinoceroses. It is located about 30 kilometers from Jagiroad and 50 Km from Guwahati. Often referred to as Mini-Kaziranga, it supports a wide range of fauna, including Asiatic Water Buffalo, Leopards, Jungle Cat, Fishing Cat, Leopard Cat, Assam Roofed Turtle, Spotted Pond Turtle, Greater Adjutant Stork and over 2000 migratory bird species in its alluvial grasslands.
- Nizorapar: Nizorapar, also known as Nijorapar, is a recreational area located in Natun Gaon, Jagiroad, Assam. The name is derived from the Assamese word "nijora," which means "waterfall," and "par," which means "the side area of that". The park, known for its scenery with a waterfall and a park with greenery, is visited by families and nature lovers. It also has a temple dedicated to Lord Shiva, which attracts visitors during Shivratri in August.
- Deosal: Deosal Shiva Temple is an ancient significant Hindu temple located in Deosal Village, near Amlighat in the town of Jagiroad. The temple is dedicated to Lord Shiva and is renowned for its historical and cultural importance. It is situated along National Highway 37, facilitating easy transportation.
- Sita Jakhala : Sita Jakhala is an old temple complex in Morigaon district, Assam, India, located on the banks of the River Killing. According to Hindu mythology, the stone steps were built by the sage Valmiki to help Goddess Sita easily reach the river while she was living at the nearby Valmiki Ashram after being exiled by Lord Rama. The steps are called "Sita Jakhala," which means "Sita's steps" in the local language.
- Koina Kanda Pahar : Koina Kanda Pahar, also called Bride Crying Rock, is found in Baghara, Jagiroad, Assam. It is located approximately 10 kilometers from Jagiroad. According to local folklore, a bride died here during her wedding journey due to a hailstorm. Mostly on Tuesday and Saturday nights, or on the same day the incident occurred, people often hear crying sounds and other disturbances related to the bride and others.

== Notable people ==
- Pijush Hazarika, Politician
