= The House with a Thousand Stories =

2013 novel by Aruni Kashyap

- Author: Aruni Kashyap
- Language: English
- Genre: Novel
- Publisher: Viking Press (Penguin India)
- Publication date: 2013
- Publication place: India
- Media type: Print (Hardcover and Paperback)
- Pages: 232
- ISBN: 978-8-184-75999-0

The House with a Thousand Stories is the debut novel by Indian writer Aruni Kashyap. Published in 2013 by Viking Press, the novel is set in Mayong, Assam, against the backdrop of the insurgency and counter-insurgency operations in the late 1990s and early 2000s. The story is narrated by Pablo, a teenager from the city of Guwahati, who visits his ancestral village for a family wedding. The novel explores themes of violence, fear, family, love, and the conflict between tradition and modernity in rural Assam.

== Plot summary ==
The novel is set between 1998 and 2002. The narrator, Pablo, a young man raised in the city, travels to his ancestral village of Mayong for the wedding of his aunt, Moina. This is his second visit to the village, the first having been for a funeral in 1998. The narrative moves between these two visits. As the wedding preparations unfold, Pablo is drawn into the complex web of family relationships, secrets, and gossip within his large extended family. His experiences are set against the pervasive fear and violence of the Assam insurgency, with the presence of the Indian Army and the shadow of the ULFA and surrendered militants (SULFA) looming over the village.

Pablo observes the tensions in his family, particularly the role of his authoritarian and unmarried aunt, Oholya, who holds a powerful position in the matriarchal family structure. He also experiences his first love with a girl named Anamika. The novel culminates in a tragedy that disrupts the wedding and forces Pablo to confront the harsh realities of life in his ancestral home.

== Major themes ==
A central theme of the novel is the pervasiveness of fear and violence in the lives of ordinary people in rural Assam during the insurgency. The narrative portrays the impact of extra-judicial killings, known as "secret killings," and the constant threat posed by both the state and militant groups. The story explores how this environment of fear affects the daily lives, relationships, and psyche of the characters.

The novel also explores the complexities of family life, tradition, and the role of women in a patriarchal society with some matriarchal influences. The character of Oholya Jethai embodies the strength and helplessness of women in this setting. The title of the novel alludes to the many stories, secrets, and gossip that circulate within the family and the village, highlighting the power of narrative and memory. The novel is also a coming-of-age story, as Pablo navigates the transition from his sheltered urban life to the stark realities of his rural heritage.

The novel has a non-linear narrative which moves between the past and present, reportedly a deliberate choice by Kashyap to reflect the traumatic nature of the events being narrated.

== Critical reception ==
The House with a Thousand Stories received generally positive reviews. Sanjukta Sharma in Mint praised the novel for its unflinching and tender portrayal of a land torn apart by violence. She noted the similarity in tone and structure to Arundhati Roy's The God of Small Things and commended Kashyap for humanizing Assam for readers outside the region. A review in La.Lit: A Literary Magazine described the novel as "an attempt to serve as a witness to greater political and societal changes happening in Assam." However, the review also offered some criticism of the language and editing.

The novel has also been the subject of academic analysis, with one paper discussing it as a work of historiographic metafiction.

== See also ==
- Assam separatist movements
- Assamese literature
