= National Highway 715A (India) =

National highway in India

National Highway 715A
- Map of the National Highway in red

Route information
- Length: 39 km (24 mi)

Major junctions
- South end: Jagiroad
- North end: Balugaon

Location
- Country: India
- States: Assam

Highway system
- Roads in India; Expressways; National; State; Asian
← NH 27	→ NH 15

National Highway 715A, commonly called NH 715A is a national highway in India. It is a spur road of National Highway 15. NH-715A traverses between Jagiroad, Bhuragaon and Balugaon in the state of Assam in India.

== Route ==
NH715A begins at Jagiroad in the Morigaon district. It traverses northwards, passing through:

- Basnaghat (Morigaon district)
- Bhuragaon (Morigaon district)
- Balugaon (Darrang district)

The highway terminates near the Dalgaon, Darrang district.

== Junctions ==
NH 27 Terminal with National Highway 27 in Jagiroad.

NH 15 Junction with National Highway 15 near Balugaon.

== Connectivity ==
The highway will starting from Jagiroad (Morigaon) to Samrang (Indo-Bhutan border). It was proposed by the Government of India on 2014 through a gazetted notification.

Starting from Jagiroad, it will begin at the junction of NH-27. Then, it will overlap with the current Jagiroad-Morigaon Road (K.K. Handique Road) until Basnaghat. From Basnaghat, the tri-junction, it will continue further north to Bhuragaon.

On the north side of the bridge from Balugaon, it will link to NH15 and it is will follow parallel to it until Rowta. From Rowta, it will extend to Samrang, near the Indo-Bhutan border.

== Significance ==
NH715A will play a crucial role in Assam's transportation network and will hold additional significance due to its strategic location:

- Regional Connectivity: The highway will provide a vital link between towns and villages within Assam and Bhutan, facilitating trade, movement of goods, and access to essential services for local communities. It will contribute to the economic and social development of the region.
- Strategic Importance: NH715A's proximity to the Indo-Bhutan border and near to Tawang will make it a strategically valuable asset. The highway will provide access to the border area, enhancing India's ability to monitor and manage border security.
- Cross-Border Trade: The highway will have the potential to streamline trade and logistics between India and Bhutan, improving connectivity with its neighboring country.
- Tourism Potential: With proper development, the surrounding region will be able to attract tourism, leveraging its natural beauty, thereby stimulating local economies.

== See also ==
- List of national highways in India
- List of national highways in India by state
