= Kagaznagar, Assam =

Industrial township in Assam, India

Kagaznagar কাগজনগৰ Nagaon Paper Mill (H.P. C.L.) Township, Jagiroad
- Industrial Township
- Location in Assam, India Kagaznagar (India)
- Coordinates: 26°07′24″N 92°13′23″E
- Country: India
- State: Assam
- District: Morigaon
- Founder: Government of India
- Named for: Nagaon Paper Mill (A unit of Hindustan Paper Corporation Limited)

Government
  - Body: Ministry of Heavy Industries and Public Enterprises

Languages
  - Official: English
  - Secondary: Hindi; Assamese

Languages
- Time zone: UTC+5:30 (IST)
- Vehicle registration: AS-21

Kagaznagar or Hindustan Paper Corporation Limited Township, Jagiroad was an industrial township for Nagaon Paper Mill in Jagiroad, Morigaon district, Assam.

== Politics ==
Jagiroad is a part of the Jagiroad (MLA) Constituency and the Nowgong (Lok Sabha constituency).

== Transportation ==
The main mode of transportation to the mill was by road. There were several bus services that ply between Guwahati, the state capital, and Jagiroad. The journey takes about two hours. There are also a few trains that pass through Jagiroad.
