= Bhuragaon Revenue Circle =

Administrative unit in Assam, India

Bhuragaon Revenue Circle is a sub-district administrative unit in the state of Assam, India. It is located in the district of Morigaon and is one of the six revenue circles in the district. The circle's headquarter is located in the town of Bhuragaon.

The Bhuragaon Revenue Circle is responsible for the administration and governance of the area under its jurisdiction. It oversees the collection of taxes, maintenance of law and order, and the provision of basic services such as healthcare and education. The revenue circle is headed by a Circle Officer (CO) who is responsible for the overall management of the area.

The economy of the area is primarily based on agriculture, with rice being the major crop. The revenue circle is also home to a number of small-scale industries such as handloom weaving, bamboo and cane crafts, and pottery. The circle has several educational institutions and healthcare facilities to cater to the needs of its residents.

== Demographics ==
The Bhuragaon Revenue Circle is home to a diverse population that includes people from different ethnic and linguistic backgrounds.

It has a total population of 123,469 as per the Census 2011. Out of which 63,418 are males while 60,051 are females. In 2011 there were a total 22,455 families residing in Bhuragaon Circle. The Average Sex Ratio of Bhuragaon Circle is 947.

The total literacy rate of Bhuragaon Circle is 63.44%. The male literacy rate is 55.36% and the female literacy rate is 47.7% in Bhuragaon Circle.

=== Religion ===
Religion in Bhuragaon Revenue Circle (2011)
Religion	Percent
Islam	60.26%
Hinduism	39.56%
Other or not stated	0.18%

According to the 2011 Census, Muslims form a clear majority in the revenue circle at 60.26% (74,400) while Hindus form a significant minority at 39.56% (48,849). Way back in 1951, Hindus were in majority but with time they became a minority due to immigration from Bangladesh and high birth rates among the Miya Muslims.

== Gaon panchayat ==
There are 12 Gaon Panchayat located in Bhuragaon area.

These are mentioned below :

S.No	Name of Gaon Panchayats
1	Balidunga GP
2	Baralimari GP
3	Bhuragaon GP
4	Bordubatop GP
5	Haiborgaon GP
6	Juribor GP
7	Kushtoli GP
8	Niz-Gerua GP
9	Niz-Saharia GP
10	Tengaguri GP
11	Tinisukia Mohmari GP
12	Tulshibori GP

== Flood ==
Like many regions in Assam, Bhuragaon revenue circle is prone to flooding, particularly during the monsoon season when heavy rains can cause rivers to overflow their banks. Flooding in Bhuragaon can cause significant damage to homes, crops, and infrastructure, and can disrupt the lives of people living in the area. The Bhuragaon Circle records show that about 5,349 hectares of land has been eroded since 1960.

In June 2019, Incessant rain and rising rivers have affected more than 10,000 people in the state and areas like Barukati, Lengribori and Tulsibori villages under the Bhuragaon revenue circle went under threat.

== See also ==
- Bhuragaon
- Morigaon district
