= Sitajakhala =

Historical and religious site in Assam, India

Sitajakhala is a historical and religious site located in the Morigaon district of Assam, India. It is primarily known for its ancient temple dedicated to Goddess Sita and Lord Hanuman, situated on the banks of the River Killing.

== Etymology ==
According to local legends, the stone steps leading to the River Killing were constructed by the sage Valmiki to facilitate Goddess Sita's access to the river during her exile.

The term "Sita Jakhala" is derived from the local language in Assam, where "Sita" refers to the revered figure of Goddess Sita from Hindu mythology, and "Jakhala" translates to "steps" or "ladder." Thus, "Sita Jakhala" literally means "Sita's steps."

== History ==
According to local beliefs and mythological accounts, Laxman left Sita at this location after her expulsion from Ayodhya by Lord Rama. Historically, the site was believed to be near a large river with Maharishi Valmiki's ashram on the opposite hills. Sita is said to have spent her pregnancy here, giving birth to Luv and Kush, and raising them.

== Geography ==
The place is located in the Morigaon district of Assam, India. It lies on the banks of the River Killing, which is a tributary of the Brahmaputra River. the place is nestled in a hilly area, with an elevation of approximately 52 meters above sea level.
