= Bhuragaon =

Bhuragaon ভূৰাগাঁও
- Town in Assam
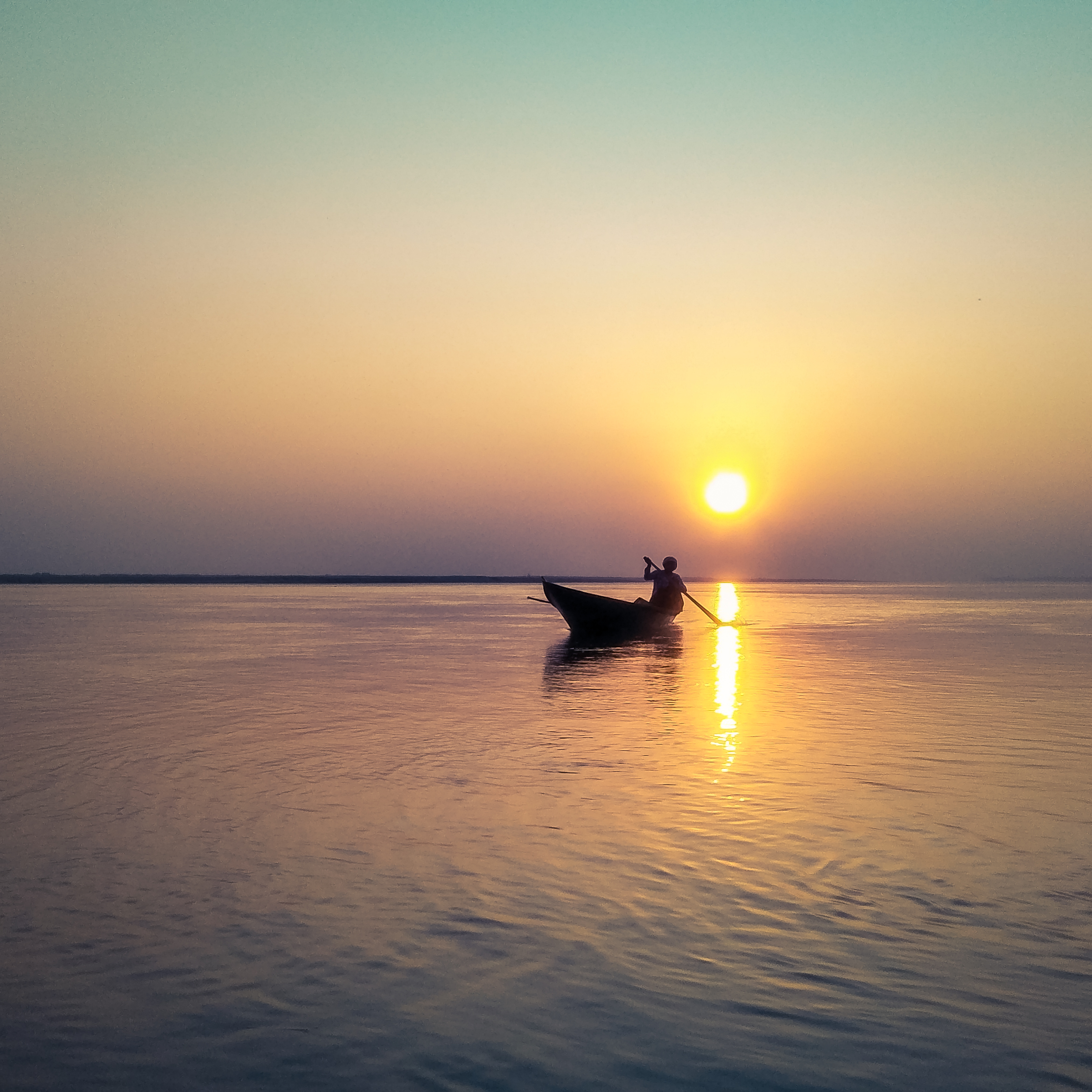
- Sunset over the Brahmaputra River in Bhuragaon.

- Location in Assam, India Bhuragaon (India)
- Coordinates: 26.404306°N 92.233782°E
- Country: India
- State: Assam
- Region: Central Assam
- District: Morigaon

Government
  - Type: Democratic
  - Body: Indian Government
  - Deputy Commissioner: Mrs. Anamika Tiwari
  - Superintendent Of Police: Shri Hemanta Kumar Das
  - MP: Devashish Sharma (BJP)

Population (2011)
  - Total: 9,845
- Demonym: Bhuragoiyan

Languages
  - Official: Assamese
- Time zone: UTC+5:30 (IST)
- PIN: 782121
- Telephone code: 03672
- Vehicle registration: AS-21
- Sex Ratio: 957 ♀️/ 1000 ♂️
- Climate: Cwa
- Languages: Bengali, Tiwa, Hindi
- Literacy Rate: ▲73.28% high
- Lok Sabha Constituency: Nagaon
- Vidhan Sabha Constituency: Morigaon
- Major highways: NH-715A
- Website: morigon.assam.gov.in

Bhuragaon is the name of a town in the Indian state of Assam. Bhuragaon is located in Morigaon district. The town is situated on the south bank of the river Brahmaputra.

== Etymology ==
The place previously known as Pabhakati. But, later the town was changed after the independence of India. Later the name, Bhuragaon derived from Assamese word Bhur (ভূৰ) (Note: A flat floating structure made of banana tree, bamboo and wood.) And Gaon (গাঁও). (Note: The term Gaon is an Assamese word that translates to village in English. It is commonly used in India to refer to a small settlement or rural area.) The native peoples, use this Bhur as a medium of transport. Later, this place came to known as Bhuragaon.

The name likely refers to the town's location on the fertile land near the Brahmaputra River, which has been an important source of livelihood for the people of Bhuragaon for centuries.

The name Bhuragaon also has an etymological connection to the Assamese word Bhuri, which means rice husk (Note: Rice husk is the protective outer covering of the rice grain. It is a byproduct of rice milling and often used as a fuel.) in English.

== Geography ==
The town is situated at a latitude of 26.40°N and a longitude of 92.23°E. It is surrounded by various districts and towns in different directions. The town borders Darrang and Sonitpur districts to the north. To the east, it is close to the towns of Laharighat and Dhing. Mayong, known for its rich history and culture, lies to the west. Morigaon, the district headquarters, is to the south of the town.

The town situated on the bank of the river Brahmaputra and surrounded by lush green forests and hills. The town covers an area of approximately 237.15 square kilometers and has an average elevation of 57 meters above sea level.

== History ==
The place has a rich history dating back to the Ahom period. In 1616, The Ahom king Pratap Singh (1603–1641 AD) appointed the exiled prince Balinarayan of Koch as the king of Darang. In 1651–52, during the reign of Swargadeo Jayadeva Singh, the two brothers Suparadhvaja and Makaradhvaja, along with thirty-two households (or seventy-two by some accounts) of Naths, including four Thakurias (ministers) each, crossed the Chauldhawa Ghat near Bhuragaon on the southern bank of the Brahmaputra, and some of them settled in Bhuragaon.

According to the chronicles of the Mayang kingdom, during the reign of Shiva Singh, the 23rd king (1779–1788 AD), a prince named Ramjai Singh arrived and founded Kachari kingdom at Pabhakati near present-day Bhuragaon. Over time, this kingdom expanded northward to reach the banks of the Brahmaputra.

Some people from the state of Pabhakati went and settled in the Dhing and Raidingia. The new kingdom was known as the Garakhia kingdom.

== Economy ==
In terms of economy, Bhuragaon is primarily an agricultural town. The fertile soil and climate of the region make it suitable for the cultivation of crops like rice, jute, mustard, and vegetables. Many farmers are engaged in milk production. Several small-scale industries exist, including handloom and handicrafts.

The Brahmaputra River flows through Bhuragaon, providing a source of livelihood for the people of the town. The river is also an important transportation route for goods and people.

The town is located in the state of Assam, India, which is prone to frequent flooding due to its proximity to the Brahmaputra River and its tributaries. Floods in the region can cause extensive damage to infrastructure, homes, and agricultural land, leading to significant economic losses and displacement of people from their homes.

The government and other organizations have implemented various measures to mitigate the effects of floods in Bhuragaon and other flood-prone areas, including building flood shelters and embankments and providing relief and assistance to those affected by floods.

== Administration ==
Bhuragaon was previously part of Nagaon district and was transferred to Morigaon district on 29 September 1989 when Morigaon was carved out of Nagaon. Since then, it has served as a revenue circle under Morigaon district administration handling all revenue, governance, and administrative matters within its jurisdiction. The Morigaon district is administered by a Deputy Commissioner, who is the highest-ranking administrative officer in the district.

== Demographics ==
=== Population ===
According to the 2011 Census information, The town, along with the sub-district Bhuragaon, is home to 9,845 people living in over Approx. 1900 households.

=== Religion ===
Religions in Bhuragaon
Religion	Percent
Hinduism	57.41%
Islam	42.13%
Other or not stated	0.46%

According to the 2011 Census, Hindus form the majority in the area at 57.41% (5,648), while Muslims form a significant minority at 42.13% (4,144). Others or not stated account for 0.46% (46).

In 1951, Hindus, particularly Assamese people, were also the majority in the Bhuragaon Revenue Circle. However, over time, they became a minority due to large-scale immigration from Bangladesh, mainly from Mymensingh, and higher birth rates among the Miya Muslims in the past.

=== Language ===
Languages spoken in Morigaon district (2011)
1. Assamese (73.0%)
2. Bengali (22.2%)
3. Hindi (1.41%)
4. Bodo (1.21%)
5. others (2.18%)

According to the 2011 census, 73.02% of the population speaks Assamese, followed by 22.18% Bengali, 1.41% Hindi and 1.21% Bodo speakers. 2.18% of the population speak other languages like Tiwa, Nepali, etc.

== Climate ==
Bhuragaon, like the rest of Assam, experiences a humid subtropical climate with high levels of rainfall throughout the year. The climate is characterized by hot summers, mild winters, and high humidity levels.

The summer season starts from March and lasts till June. During this period, the temperature ranges from 25 °C to 35 °C, with occasional heat waves that can push the temperature up to 40 °C. The humidity levels are also high during this period, which can make the weather feel hotter and more uncomfortable.

The monsoon season starts in June and lasts till September. During this period, the town receives a significant amount of rainfall, which can sometimes lead to flooding and landslides. The average annual rainfall is around 1600 mm, with the highest amount of rainfall occurring in July and August.

The winter season starts in November and lasts till February. During this period, the temperature ranges from 10 °C to 20 °C, and the humidity levels are relatively low. The weather is generally pleasant during this period, making it a popular time for tourists to visit the town and explore its natural beauty.

== Politics ==
Bhuragaon is represented in the Assam Legislative Assembly by the member of the legislative assembly (MLA) from the Morigaon (Assembly constituency). Earlier it was part of the Laharighat Assembly constituency.

Rama Kanta Dewri was elected to the Assam Legislative Assembly from Morigaon in the 2021 Assam Legislative Assembly election as a member of the ruling Bhartiya Janata Party. The MLA is elected by the residents of the constituency every five years and is responsible for representing their interests in the state legislature.

The town is part of Nowgong (Lok Sabha constituency). Devashish Sharma is the current MP from Nowgong Parliament Constituency.

== Education ==
Bhuragaon, like many other towns in India, places great importance on education as a means of promoting social and economic development. The town has a number of educational institutions that offer primary, secondary, and higher education to the residents of the town and the surrounding areas, which have played a significant role in promoting education and literacy in the region.

At the primary level, Bhuragaon has several government-run and private schools that offer education up to the fifth standard. These schools follow the curriculum prescribed by the Assam State Board of Education and provide basic education in subjects such as languages, mathematics, science, and social studies.

At the secondary level, there are several government and private schools that offer education up to the tenth standard. These schools provide education in a wide range of subjects and prepare students for the Assam High School Leaving Certificate (HSLC) examination, which is a crucial milestone in the educational journey of students in Assam.

Bhuragaon is also home to a college that offer undergraduate courses in various disciplines, including arts, science, and commerce. These colleges are affiliated with the Gauhati University, which is one of the largest universities in the region.

=== Schools ===
S.No	Name of Schools	Refs.
1	Shankardev Shishu Vidya Niketan, Bhuragaon	
2	Bhuragaon Haricharan Sarkar HS School	
3	Bhuragaon Adarsha ME School	
4	Bhuragaon Jatiya Vidyalay	
5	Modern Markaz Academy	

=== Colleges ===
S.No	Name of Colleges	Refs.
1	Bhuragaon College	
2	Gerua Kabiram boro junior College	

== Culture ==
The culture of Bhuragaon is deeply rooted in the Assamese culture and traditions, which have been passed down through generations.

The people of Bhuragaon are predominantly engaged in agriculture.

=== Cuisine ===
Foods eaten are often simple, rich in flavour and using local ingredients. They are influenced by the abundance of rice (Note: Rice is a major part of the diet in Bhuragaon, and it is consumed in various forms such as boiled rice, puffed rice, flattened rice, and rice flour.) and fish (Note: Fish is a popular food in Bhuragaon. The area has so much fresh water with ponds, lakes, and the river, offering ample opportunities for fishing and a rich variety of all types of freshwater fish.) in the region.

Dishes include Bilahi Maas, a tangy fish curry cooked with tomatoes, Til Gahori, pork cooked with black sesame seeds, and Poita Bhaat, fermented rice soaked overnight, often eaten with mustard oil adn chilies. Pigeon curry is often prepared during special occasions like Bihu and New year.

The local language of Bhuragaon is Assamese, but Bengali and Hindi are also widely spoken. (Note: Apart from Assamese, there are several other languages spoken in the town, including Bodo, Karbi, Mishing, and Dimasa. These languages belong to different language families and have their own unique scripts.)

== Health ==
There is one primary healthcare center in Bhuragaon, which is operated by the government and provides basic medical care to the residents of the town. The healthcare center has a limited number of doctors, nurses, and other healthcare staff, and lacks adequate resources and equipment. As a result, many people have to travel to nearby cities like Nagaon or Guwahati to access better healthcare services.

Overall, while the healthcare infrastructure is limited, the government is taking steps to improve healthcare services and control the spread of communicable and non-communicable diseases. The town also has several non-governmental organizations (NGOs) and community-based organizations that work to improve healthcare access and awareness among the residents.

== Transport ==
=== Road ===
The National Highway 715A will pass through Bhuragaon. it will be a spur road of National Highway 15. This highway will link the town with the Jagiroad, where NH37, a part of the East-West Corridor, will pass towards the state capital, Guwahati. Additionally, it will lead towards the Indo-Bhutan border (Samrang).

Proposed Bhuragaon-Kharupetia Bridge will also pass through Bhuragaon. It will connect Kharupetia in Darrang district on the northern bank with Bhuragaon in Morigaon District on the southern bank.

The town is well connected by buses, especially to Guwahati, Upper Assam, and Lower Assam. Three-wheelers and four-wheelers like buses and vans are used for transport. In the town and nearby areas, e-rickshaws (tuk-tuk) and auto rickshaws are the primary means of transportation.

=== Rail ===
The railway station serving Bhuragaon is Jagiroad. Which was situated Approximately 42 km South-West of Bhuragaon.

The Guwahati-Lumding line of Indian Railway passes through Jagiroad Railway Station. Many intercity and passenger trains have stoppage in this station.

Another Railway Station from Bhuragaon is Mairabari Railway Station.The distance between Bhuragaon and Mairabari is 22 km. There was a passenger train, Guwahati - Mairabari Kolongpar Passenger (55603) from Mairabari Railway Station via Haibargaon-Chaparmukh Line.

=== Air ===
Lokpriya Gopinath Bordoloi International Airport, also known as Gauhati International Airport (IATA: GAU), which falls under the city of Guwahati is the nearest airport from Bhuragaon.

=== Water ===
The waterways transportation services in Bhuragaon are used for transporting bulk goods and for movement of passenger. Items like corn, mustard, peanuts, jute, etc., were traded and transported through this route.

Ferry services are available to take people between different ports in Bhuragaon along the Brahmaputra River to Badlichar, and other places in Darrang District.

== Tourism ==
=== Patekibori ===
The great poet saint of Assam, Srimanta Sankardeva, was born in the year 1449 at a small village called Patekibori near Bhuragaon in Marigaon district. The famous Patekibori Satra also situated in Patekibori.

=== Barshibandha ===
Bull fighting began in the Ahom era. But it was very extensive. This game is still played at Barshibandha, Morigaon. The first time is on Magh Bihu and the second time is on 26 January on the occasion of Democracy Day.

=== Rajagadhuwa ===
There was a place called Rajagadhuwa near Bhuragaon Town. In local language, Raja means King and Dhuwa means wash, so the term Rajagadhuwa means a place where the king takes bath in past.

=== Shivbari ===
An ancient temple of Hindu god Shiva has located in Shivari, near the Bhuragaon Bazar. On the month of July–August, a yearly mela held here.

=== Sonduba ===
There are many sources of information about the historical Sondoba River in the Bhuragaon area of Morigaon district. In local assamese Language, xun or son means gold and duba means sink or immerse. Thus, the word Sonduba means a place, where gold has immersed. The Sondoba River flows from the Bardowa Shanti Jan and flows later from the confluence of Sonai and Lali. According to legend, the Sondoba River existed a hundred years before the birth of Mahapurusha Sankardeva. There was a temple of lord Ganesha in Sonduba, Bhuragaon. Where, a banyan tree has a shape like the face of Ganesha.

=== Basnaghat ===
The name Basnaghat has been pronounced ‘Basonaghat’ by the local Bengali speaking peoples. However, the birth name of the place is Baxonaghat. It is said that, a Tiwa king had lust with his queen at this place. Therefore, the place is called Basnaghat.

=== Mayong ===
Mayong is a small village located near Bhuragaon and is known for its association with black magic and witchcraft. The village is home to several practitioners of traditional magic and is a popular destination for those interested in mysticism and the occult.

== Notable people ==
- Anil Raza - Former general secretary, Assam Pradesh Congress Committee.
- Abdul Jalil - Former member of Assam legislative assembly (MLA) from Laharighat constituency in 1985. He was a member of Congress (I).
- Haricharan Sarkar - Founder of Bhuragaon Haricharan Sarkar High School.
- Babul Bora - Former General Secretary, Srimanta Sankaradeva Sangha.

== See also ==
- Bhuragaon Revenue Circle
- Bhuragaon-Kaupati Bridge
- National Highway 715A
- Morigaon Assembly Constituency
- Morigaon District
