= Mayong, Assam =

Mayong Mayang
- Nickname: Tinkal
- Location in Assam, India Mayong (India)
- Coordinates: 26°15′31.87″N 92°02′26.85″E
- Country: India
- State: Assam
- District: Morigaon

Languages
  - Official: Assamese
- Time zone: UTC+5:30 (IST)
- Telephone code: 913678
- ISO 3166 code: IN-AS
- Vehicle registration: AS

Mayong (or Mayang) is a village in Morigaon district, Assam, India. It lies on the bank of the river Brahmaputra, approximately 40 km (25 mi) from the city of Guwahati. Mayong is a tourist attraction because of its history.

== Etymology ==
The origin of the name may be based in the Chutia/Tiwa/Deori word Ma-yong which means mother, the Kachari word for an elephant (Miyong), and ongo meaning part. Some believe that Manipuris from the Moirang clan used to inhabit this area therefore; the name Moirang became Mayhong with time.

== History ==
Mayong along with Pragjyotishpura (the ancient name of Assam) finds place in many epics, including the Mahabharata. Chief Ghatotkacha of Kachari Kingdom took part in The Great Battle of Mahabharata with his magical powers. It was also said about Mayong that Tantrik (one who practices Tantra) and witches took shelter in the forests of Mayong. Many tales of men disappearing into air, people being converted into animals, or beasts being magically tamed have been associated with Mayong. Sorcery and magic were traditionally practiced and passed down over generations.

Narabali or human sacrifices were carried until the early modern period. Excavators had recently dug up swords and other sharp weapons that resembled tools used for human sacrifice in other parts of India, suggesting that human sacrifice may have occurred in the Ahom era in Mayong.

== Tourism ==
Mayong is a tourist and archaeological location because of its rich wildlife, archaeology pilgrimage, eco-tourism, adventure tourism, cultural tourism and river tourism. Mayong is also famous for its connection and past relationships with Black magic. But that was one part of the story it has been popularly known as, however, now people are trying to develop Mayong into a tourism circuit to shed its past tantra image. Combine with Pobitora Wildlife Sancturary, Mayong offers local life, traditional knowledge, authentic food and a serious hospitality.

=== Mayong Central Museum and Emporium ===
There are numerous archaeological relics and artefacts, including books on Tantra Kriya and Ayurveda at the Mayong Central Museum and Emporium, which was opened in 2002. Very close to Mayong is the Pobitora Wildlife Sanctuary. This Sanctuary has the highest density of one horned rhinoceros in the world.

Mayong tourism and hospitality

An aspect of Mayong that has gone unnoticed is the tourism and hospitality it offers, culturally amalgamated with a rich flora and fauna. At the heart is the Pobitora Wildlife Sanctuary, where the rhino-rich landscape is a major attraction. Along with Mayong's rich cultural heritage of folklore, traditions, indigenous knowledge and history, it has become a key destination for travellers. A visible change is seen in the growth of resorts, homestays and other hospitality assets to strengthen the tourism ecosystem and provide an alternative for travellers coming to Assam, who can visit the Kamakhya in the morning and then stay the night in Mayong and go for an early morning safari the next day.

== See also ==
- Tourism in Assam
