= Tata Semiconductor Assembly and Test =

Indian semiconductor manufacturing company

Tata Semiconductor Assembly and Test Pvt. Ltd. (TSAT) is India's first indigenous and greenfield semiconductor assembly and test facility factory in Jagiroad. It is further poised to become a landmark industrial project for the northeast India.

The project is part of India's Semiconductor policy, supported by the India Semiconductor Mission and Assam's Electronics policy. Construction was set to begin in 2024, with the first phase ready by mid-2025. This will greatly boost industrialization in North-East India.

== Background and Inception ==
The project was approved by the Union Cabinet chaired by Prime Minister Narendra Modi on 29 February 2024. A meeting was held on 29 July 2024, at Janata Bhawan with officials from the Tata Group and the state government, preceding the scheduled 3 August 2024, Bhumi Pujan ceremony for the upcoming Tata Group semiconductor unit.

The foundation of the Tata Semiconductor facility was officially laid with a groundbreaking ceremony held on 3 August 2024. The event was attended by key figures, including Assam's Chief Minister Himanta Biswa Sarma and Tata Sons Chairman N Chandrasekaran. The ceremony was a significant milestone, signaling the commencement of what is considered a game-changing project for the region and the entire country.

According to the proposal, the semiconductor unit is expected to be established at erstwhile Hindustan Paper Corporation's Nagaon Paper Mill premise, which has been non-operational for several years.

== Investment and impact ==
The Tata Semiconductor facility in Jagiroad, Assam, represents a significant investment of approximately INR 27,000 crore (around US$3.6 billion). This substantial financial commitment is part of Tata Electronics' strategy to develop a cutting-edge semiconductor assembly and test facility, which is expected to generate over 25,000 direct and indirect jobs in the region. (Note: Various news outlets in India report different numbers for the estimated future direct and indirect jobs that it will provide. Hindustan Times, The Economic Times, Business Today, and others report it as 27,000 jobs, while Times Now reports it as 30,000 jobs.) This project aims to boost the local economy and advance India's position in the global semiconductor industry.

=== Collaborations ===
On 16 April 2024, Tata Electronics and Tesla had been said to sign a strategic deal to procure semiconductor chips for its worldwide operations. Apart from Taiwan, China and South Korea, India is expected to join the chip supplies group soon.
