= Pobitora Wildlife Sanctuary =

Wildlife sanctuary in Assam, India

- IUCN category IV (habitat/species management area)
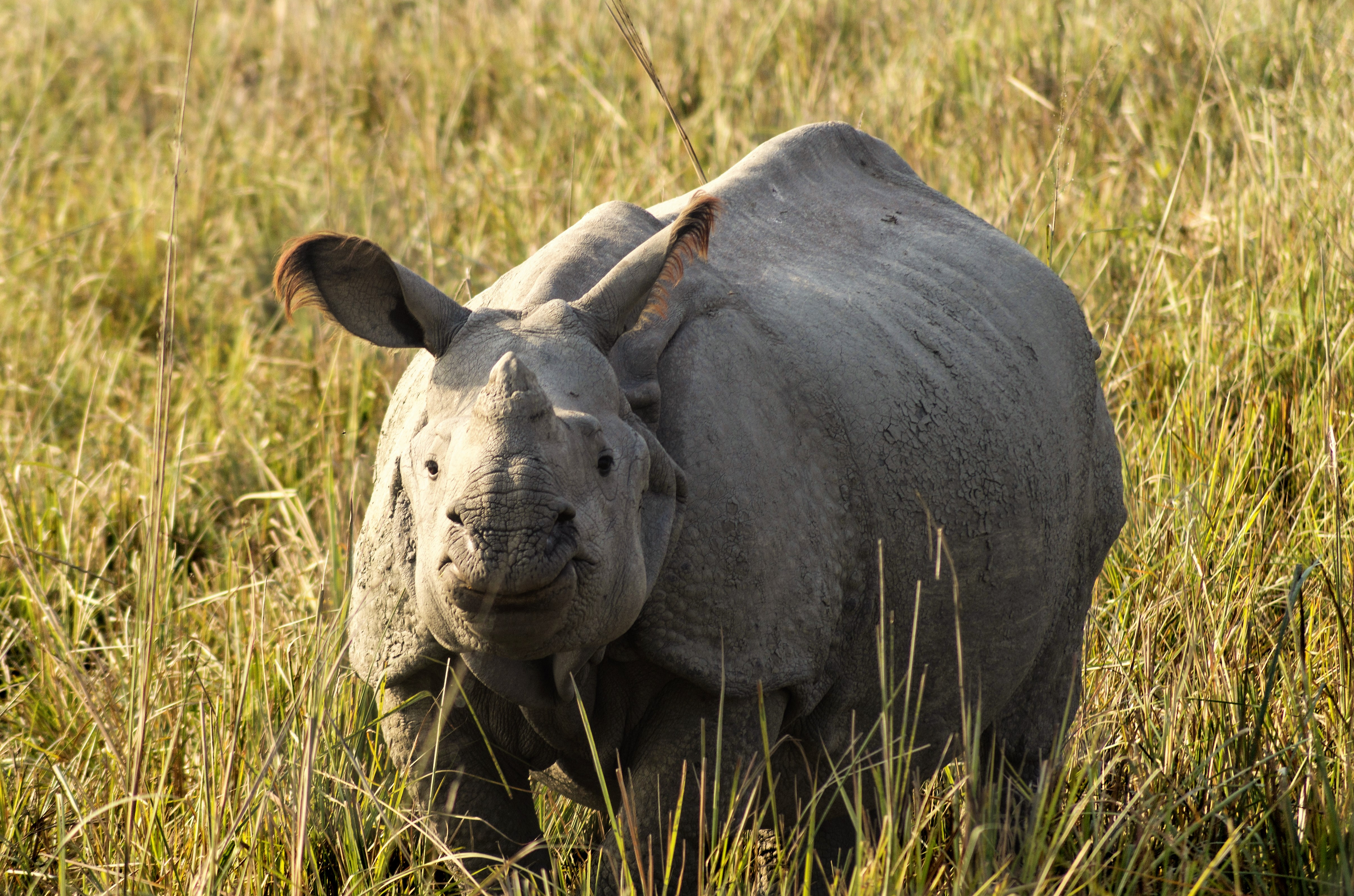
- Indian rhinoceros in Pobitora Wildlife Sanctuary

- Location within Assam Location within India
- Interactive map of Pobitora Wildlife Sanctuary
- Location: Morigaon, Assam
- Nearest city: Guwahati
- Coordinates: 26°14′28″N 92°03′30″E
- Area: 38.85 km^{2} (15.00 sq mi)
- Established: 1987; 39 years ago
- Website: www.pobitora.com

Pobitora Wildlife Sanctuary (/ˈpoʊbətɒrə/) is a wildlife sanctuary on the southern bank of the Brahmaputra in Morigaon district in Assam, India. It was declared in 1987 and covers 38.85 km^{2} (15.00 sq mi), providing grassland and wetland habitat for the Indian rhinoceros. It holds one of the largest Indian rhinoceros population in Assam.

== Biodiversity ==
Pobitora Wildlife Sanctuary's grassland vegetation consists of at least 15 grass species including Cynodon dactylon, whip grass (Hemarthria compressa), vetiver (Chrysopogon zizanioides), ravennagrass (Saccharum ravennae), Phragmites karka, southern cutgrass (Leersia hexandra) and signalgrass (Brachiaria pseudointerrupta). The grasslands provide habitat and food resource for the Indian rhinoceros, hosting Assam's second largest population. Other mammals occurring in the sanctuary are golden jackal, wild boar and feral water buffalo. Barking deer, Indian leopard and rhesus macaque live foremost in the hilly parts. It is an Important Bird Area and home for more than 2000 migratory birds and various reptiles.
