= Morigaon =

- Town
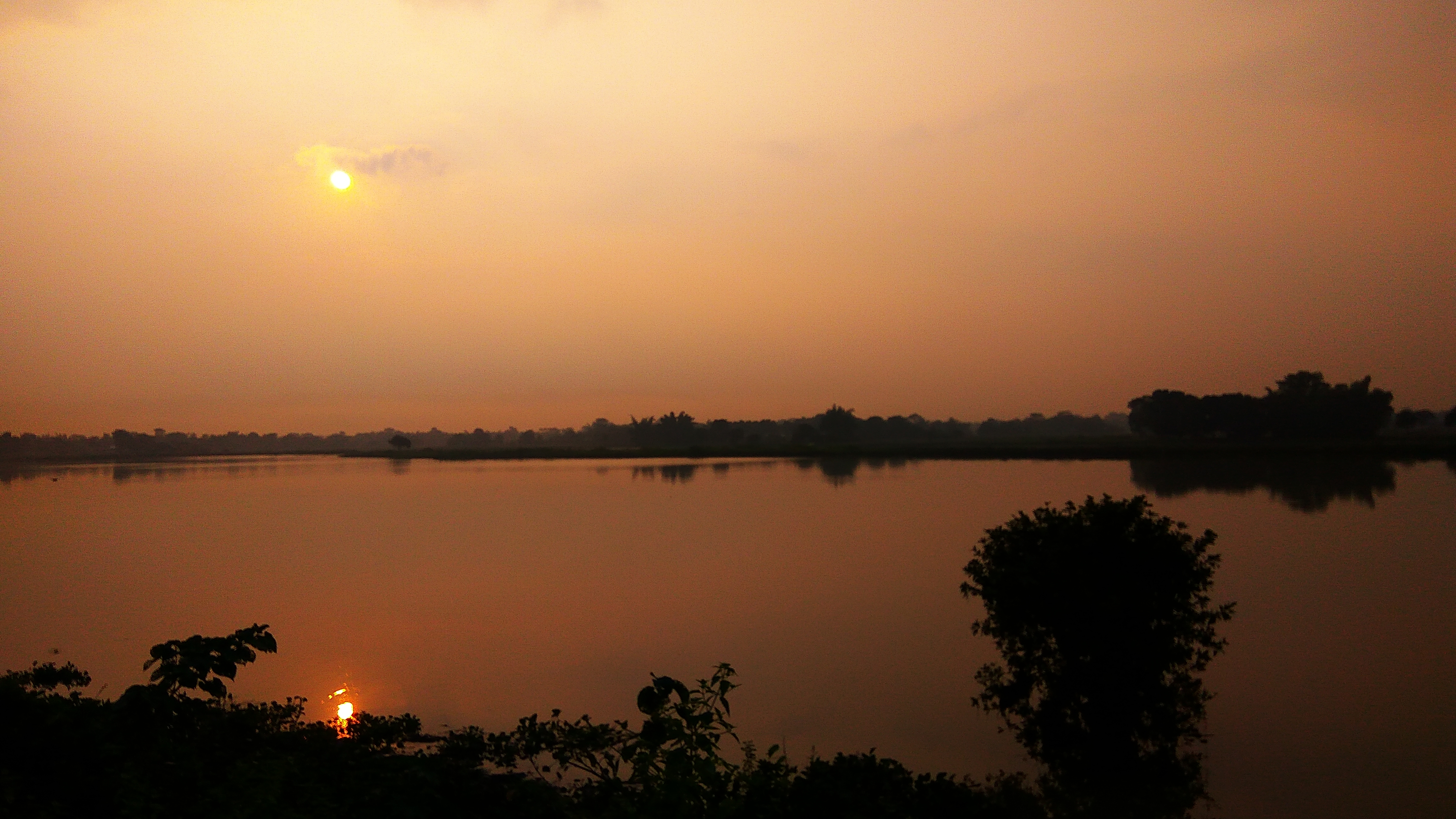
- Saron Bil at Morigaon

- Location in Assam, India Morigaon (India)
- Coordinates: 26°15′08″N 92°20′32″E
- Country: India
- State: Assam
- District: Morigaon
- Founder: Bhim Singh
- Named for: Mori Beel

Government
  - Type: Municipality Board
  - Body: Morigaon Municipality Board, Tiwa Autonomous Council (TAC), Tiwashong, Assam

Population (2001)
  - Total: 29,164
- Demonym: Morigoiyan

Languages
  - Official: Assamese
- Time zone: UTC+5:30 (IST)
- PIN: 782105
- ISO 3166 code: IN-AS
- Vehicle registration: AS
- Website: morigaon.gov.in

Morigaon (pron: mʌrɪˈgãʊ) is a town and the district headquarters of Morigaon district in the Indian state of Assam. It also serves as the headquarters of the Tiwa Autonomous Council.

== Geography ==
Morigaon, the administrative headquarters of Morigaon district in Assam, covers a geographical area of approximately 4 square kilometers.

The town is bounded by Morikolong Beel to the southwest. The surrounding geography features fertile alluvial plains, with the Brahmaputra River marking the northern boundary of the district,

== Demographics ==
As of 2011 Census India, Morigaon had a population of 29,164 males constitute 50.7% of the population and females 49.3%. Morigaon has an average literacy rate of 89.42%, higher than the state average of 72.19%: Male literacy is 92.95%, and female literacy is 85.82%. In Morigaon, 11.13% of the population is within the age of 0–6. The Tiwa (Lalung) community form the majority in this district.

== Politics ==
Morigaon was upgraded from a Town Committee to a Municipal Board in 2008, currently comprising 11 wards. Morigaon is part of the Nagaon Lok Sabha constituency and Morigaon constituency in Legislative Assembly.

The town also serves as the headquarters of the Tiwa Autonomous Council, which was established to promote the interests of the Tiwa community and manage local affairs.

== Transport ==
Morigaon town has a developing transport infrastructure that facilitates connectivity within the region. The town is primarily served by road transport, with several key roads connecting it to nearby areas. National Highway 37 (India) runs through the nearby Jagiroad, approximately 22 kilometers away, linking Morigaon to major cities and regions in Assam.

Additionally, the Guwahati–Lumding section operated by Indian Railways' Northeast Frontier Railway, provides rail connectivity, although the nearest railway station is in Jagiroad. Local transport options include auto-rickshaws and cycle rickshaws, which help residents navigate the town and its surroundings.

== Education ==
Morigaon town has a developing educational landscape, featuring several colleges and schools that cater to the local population. Notable institutions include Morigaon College, Ghanakanta Baruah College, and the College of Education, which provide higher education opportunities. Additionally, the District Institute of Education and Training (DIET) and the Industrial Training Institute (ITI) contribute to vocational training in the area.

For primary and secondary education, schools such as Javahar Navodaya Vidyalaya, Radhakrishnan Central Academy, Shankardev Vidya Niketan, and St. Theresa's School play a crucial role in shaping the educational environment.

== Tourist Guide ==
=== Pobitora Wildlife Sanctuary ===
Pobitora Wildlife Sanctuary, situated in the flood plains of River Brahmaputra in the district of morigaon. The extent of the Protected area is 38.81 km^{2} lays between latitude 26012' N to 26015' N and longitude 91059' E to 92005' E Pobitora originally was a grazing reserve of erstwhile nagaon district, came into limelight during the year 1961-62 for sighting of One Horned Rhino (Rhinoceros unicornis). The area of 1584.76 ha was declared as reserve forest (RF) in 1971 vied Govt. Notification no. 4/Settlement/542/54 dt 18 November 1971. The adjacent Rajamayong Hill an area of 1191.86 ha was also a RF declared during 1957 vied Govt. notification no. AFS 427/54/11 dt. 20 September 1957. Keeping in view the importance of Rhino in the area, a Preliminary notification was issued declaring a total area of 3880.62 ha of land as Pobitara Wildlife Sanctuary comprising both the RF (2776.62 ha) and Govt. Khas land (1104 ha) between the RF vied Govt. notification FWR/19/87/39 dt 16 July 1987. Subsequently, final notification of the sanctuary was published vied Govt. notification no. FRS/19/87/153 dt 17 March 1998 and published in Assam Gazette on 13 May 1998. The Govt. Khas land that brought within the periphery of Sanctuary are Murkata I & II with 336.00 ha, Diprang with 40.00 ha, Thengbhanga with 176 ha and Kamarpur/Rajamayong Koritor Khas land with an area of 552 ha. The natural boundary of the Pobitara wildlife sanctuary is the Garanga Beel on the south and the river Brahmaputra on the North, rest of the boundary are artificial and surrounded by 27 villages. Significantly, the PA is free from human habitation.

Biodiversity

Pobitara harbors the highest density of Rhino in the world and second highest concentration of Rhino in Assam after Kaziranga National Park. The riverine composition of forest with vast grassland in 15.9 sq. km of the PA is the ideal habitat for Rhino. The transformation of this grazing reserve into an ideal Rhino habitat is remarkable. Natural forest consists of Albizzia lebek, Lagerstomia speciosa, Bombax ceiba, Dilania indica etc. The grassland consists of Sacchrum spp., Phragmatis Karka, Themmeda arundinacea, Vetivaria zizanioides etc. The perennial water bodies (Beel) are the breeding of different variety fishes and also fulfill the necessary requirement of animals such as wallowing etc. These beels attracts a sizable amount of migrant water fowls. Besides Rhino, Buffalo, Wild Boar etc. Pobitora supports two Critically Endangered, four Endangered, eight Vulnerable and three Near Threatened bird species. Marsh Babbler (Pellorneum palustre) is the Assam plains Endemic bird species recorded in Pobitora Wildlife Sanctuary. The Rajamayong hill with an area of 11.98 sq. km. also harbours various species like Leopard, Lesser cats, barking deer etc. The forest consists of Anthocephalus cadamba (Kadam), Alstonia Scholaris (Satiana), Dellenia pentagyna (Oxi), Terminalia tomentosa (Sain), Bridelia retusa (Kuhir), Careya arborea (Kum) etc. This hill also servers as a sheltering ground during the high floods which is common in the PA.

Getting There

Pobitara Wildlife Sanctuary could be accessed from Guwahati, the capital city of the state of Assam, the district headquarter Morigaon and the industrial town Jagiroad through National Highway 37 and State Highway 3. The Sanctuary is situated about 35 km. from Guwahati via Chandrapur. The other approach road from the city 52 km. of which 32 km. is along the National Highway No.-37 and 18 km. along the state road. Road from Guwahati :- 1. From Guwahati while going to Upper Assam through the NH-37 after crossing Sonapur a small place Chamata is reached. From here turning left on the state PWD road leads to Pobitara. There is a directly public bus runs from Adabari bus station to Mayong. Otherwise, Chamata could be accessed through all buses that goes to upper Asam side. From Chamata, Public Buses run up to Kolongpar, 4 km away from the Ranga H.Q.Autoricksaw is available from Kolongpar to Range HQ. 2. There is another road from Guwahati to Mayong via Chandrapur. His road is the shortest from Guwahati and connects Guwahati with the upper Assam via Morigaon. Road from Jagiroad :- There is direct bus connection from Jagiroad, the commercial and industrial township of Morigaon district to Mayong. Jagiroad is situated 34 km from Mayong. Road from Morigaon :-Buses also runs from the HQ, Morigaon, which is 42 km away Rail :- The nearest rail head is Jagiroad which is well connected to Guwahati. Air :- The nearest airport is Gopi Nath Bordoloi international Airport, borjhar (Guwahati) and it is 75 km. away from the Range HQ. Best time to Visit : November to February

=== Mayong ===
Mayong, the enchanting land of occult practices is located in the west of the district Morigaon. It is only 40 km. away from the capital city of Guwahati, Assam. The place is endowed with a variety of Tourist attractions that can enable to satisfy the Tourists of diverse interests.

Nature-based and wildlife Tourism: The main attraction of Mayong is Pobitora Wildlife Sanctuary which has the world's highest density of one horned rhinoceroses. Apart from rhinos, it is also a home for wild boars and wild buffalos. Tourists can enjoy its beauty by elephant safari and jeep safari.

There are number of picturesque hills and hillocks in and around Mayong. Moreover, the river Brahmaputra flowing towards the west side of the village has also added to its natural beauty.

Pilgrim Tourism: There are ample number of ancient shrines and temples in and around Mayong. The place is called the "Land of Pancha Devata", which refers to five deities who are Dinesh, Ganesh, Vishnu, Siva and Shivi (Parvati).

Some important pilgrimage sites are – Kechaikhaiti Shrine of Burha Mayong, Narashinha Ashram of Hiloikhunda, Ganesh Temple of Hatimuria, Shiv Shrine of Kachashila etc.

Archeological Tourism: Mayong is also known for its archeological ruins and monuments. There is a big stone inscription, dating back several hundred years located at a hilly village Burha Mayong. The inscription is 3.85 Mtrs. long and it has been regarded as the longest stone – inscription found in Asia. Again, there exist one beautiful stone image of Shiv-Parvati and three of Lord Ganesha (belonging to 12th century) at Burha Mayong village, one stone image of Shiv-Parvati and one of Lord Ganesha (of about 10th century) at Chanaka village, one king sized stone image of Lord Ganesha (10th Century) at Ganesha Temple of Hatimuris village, two stone images of Shiv-Parvati (of about 9th century) at Shiv Shrine of Kachashila Hill and Many others.

Apart from these a lots of other archeological findings of the area like stone-exes, stone-bullets, whet-stones Lotus circles, Yonipeeths, Shiva Lingams and different kinds of earthen vessels and images (terracottas) are preserved at Mayong village Museum and Research Centre.

River Tourism: As this area is located on the bank of the river Brahmaputra, it bears an ample scope for river tourism. Services of river cruises from Guwahati to Kajalimukh near Mayong or back bears enormous tourism potential.

Eco-Tourism: Tourists can enjoy the beauty of nature in or around Mayong which is covered by hills, hillocks, river, natural water bodies etc.

Sporting Activities for Tourists: The recent introduction of solar rickshaws and aero motors in Mayong has added new dimensions to the Tourists attractions.

Land of Tantra Mantra and Black Magic: Mayong is a land of Tantra-Mantra and famous for its practice of Black Magic. Age old tradition of Black Magic is also a source of tourist attractions.

=== Kachasila ===
Kachasila Hill has a temple which dates back to the 9th century. The temple has idols of Lord Shiva and Goddess Parvati. Many beautiful idols of Lord Ganesha can also be seen in the temple. Researchers often visit the temple to study the rare statues and coriin stones. Kachasila is located near Pobitora Wildlife Sanctuary

=== Deosal ===
It is situated by National Highway no.37 about 4 km. away from Jagiroad town, with a big ancient temple of Lord Shiva. Shiva Ratri Mela is observed every Year very colourfully. Local people believe that Deosal was the Ashram of Valmiki, where Sita Devi was left by Rama.

=== Sitajakhala ===
It was discovered in the last year of the fourth decade of the last Century. Several steps were made by cutting the stones from the temple to the River Killing at the Sita Jakhala Hills. The wall of the temple is full of statues of Hanuman & Sita herself. So people believe that Valmiki cut those stones as steps for Sita to go to the river from the temple when she was pregnant and leftby Rama. So the steps got the name SITA JAKHALA. This area is very rich in cattle population.

=== Sivakunda ===
This is a water fall in the Amsoi hills, located about 10 k.ms.from National Highway no.37 towards south. It is a picturesque spot and a large number of people gather from October to March for picnic. One can have a view of the beautiful Amsoi Tea Estates on the way.
