= Morigaon district =

Coordinates: 26°15′00″N 92°20′24″E

- District of Assam
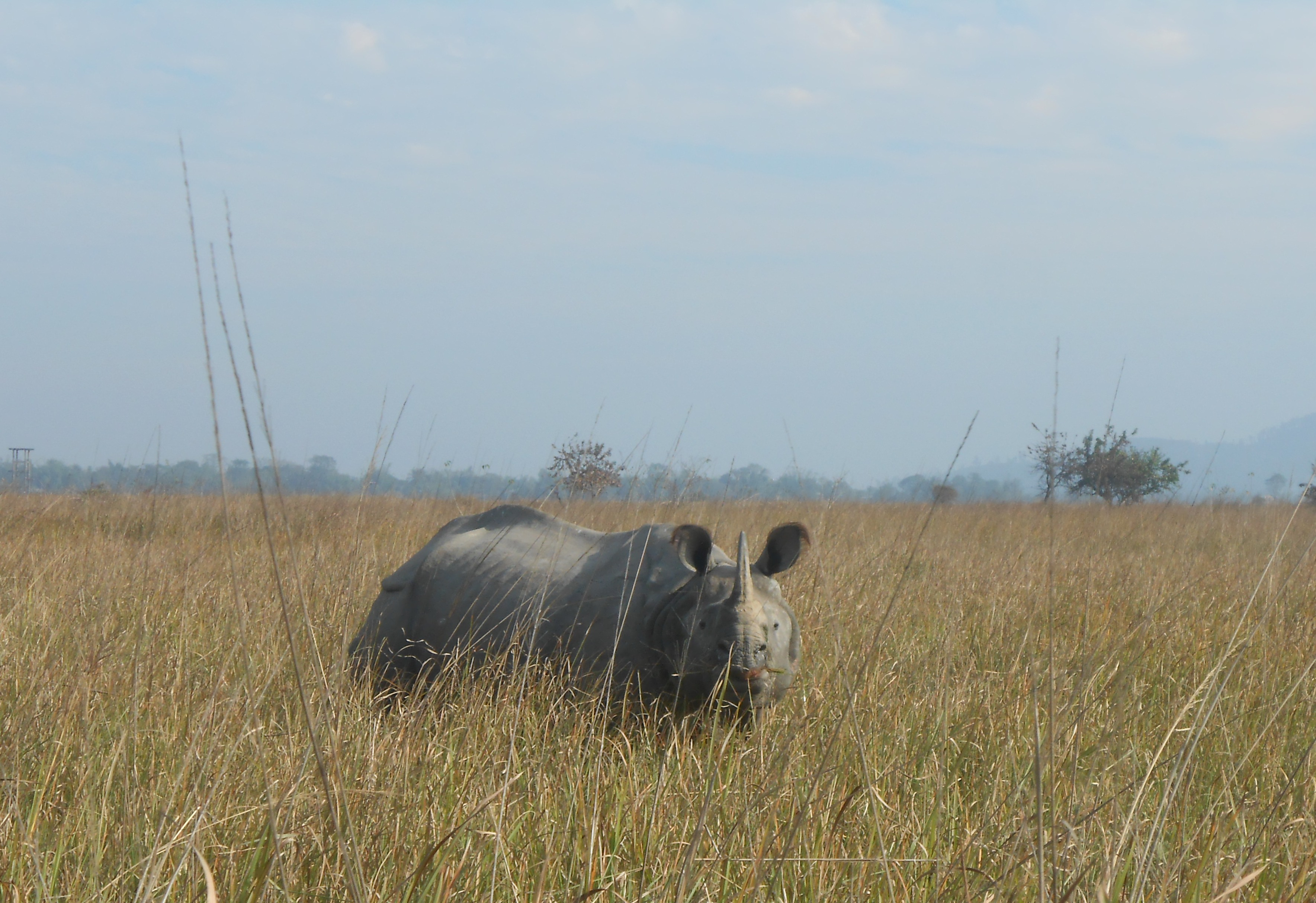
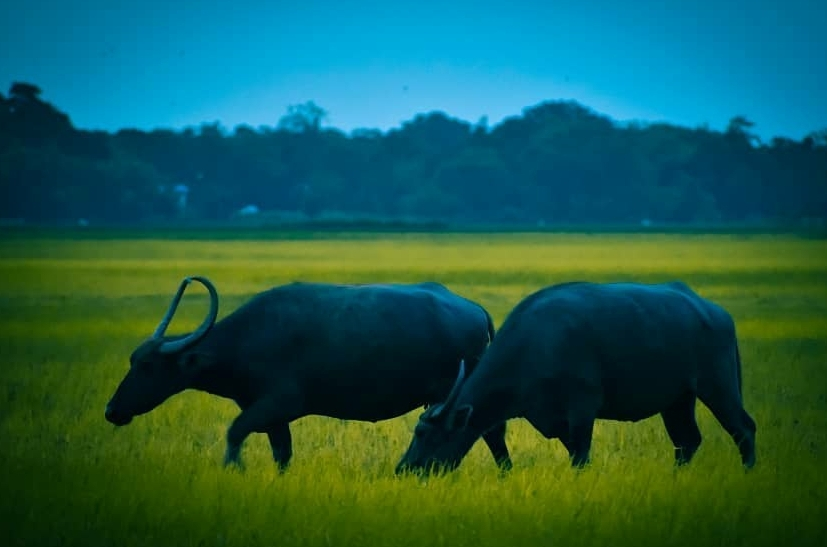
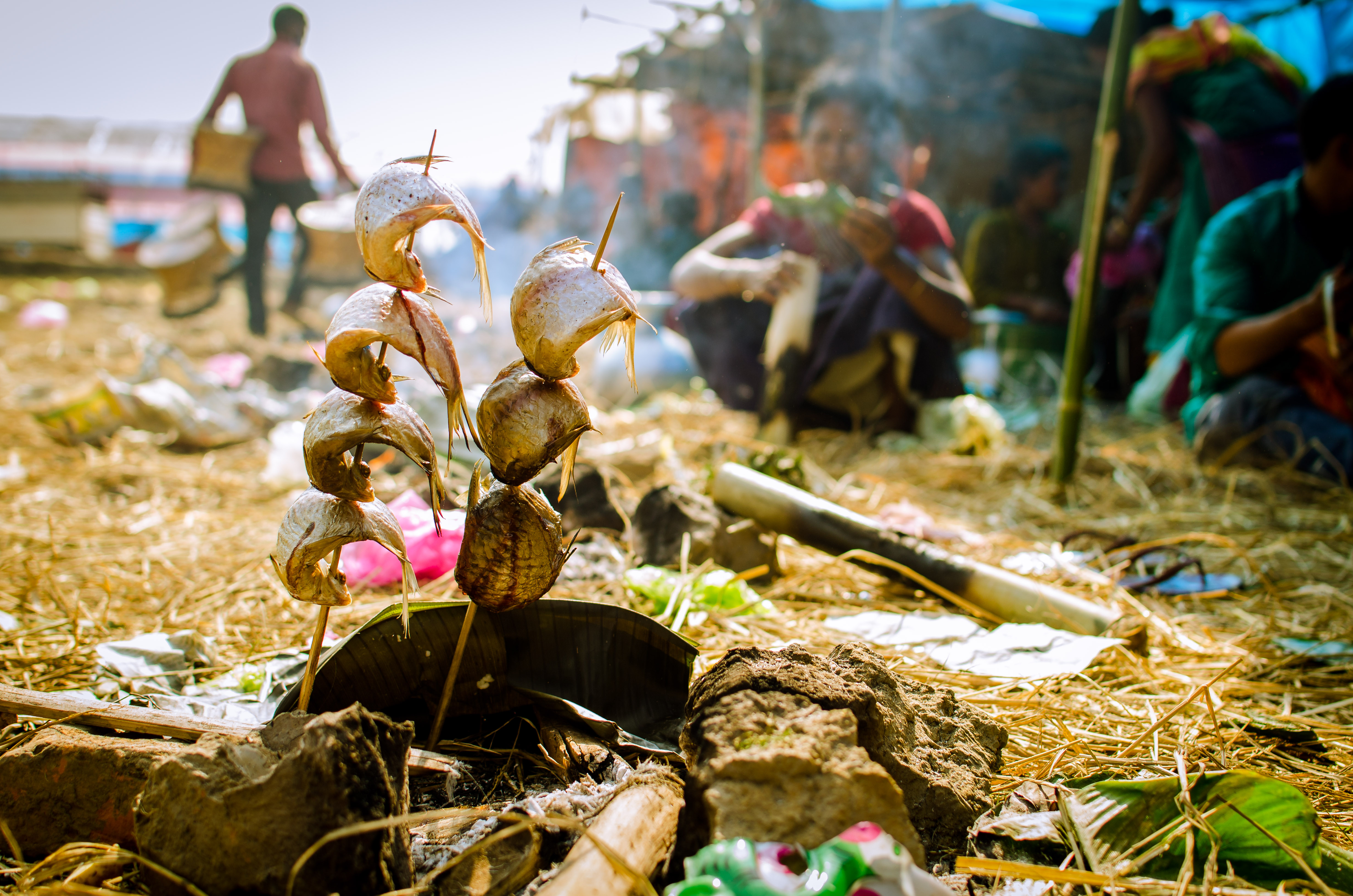
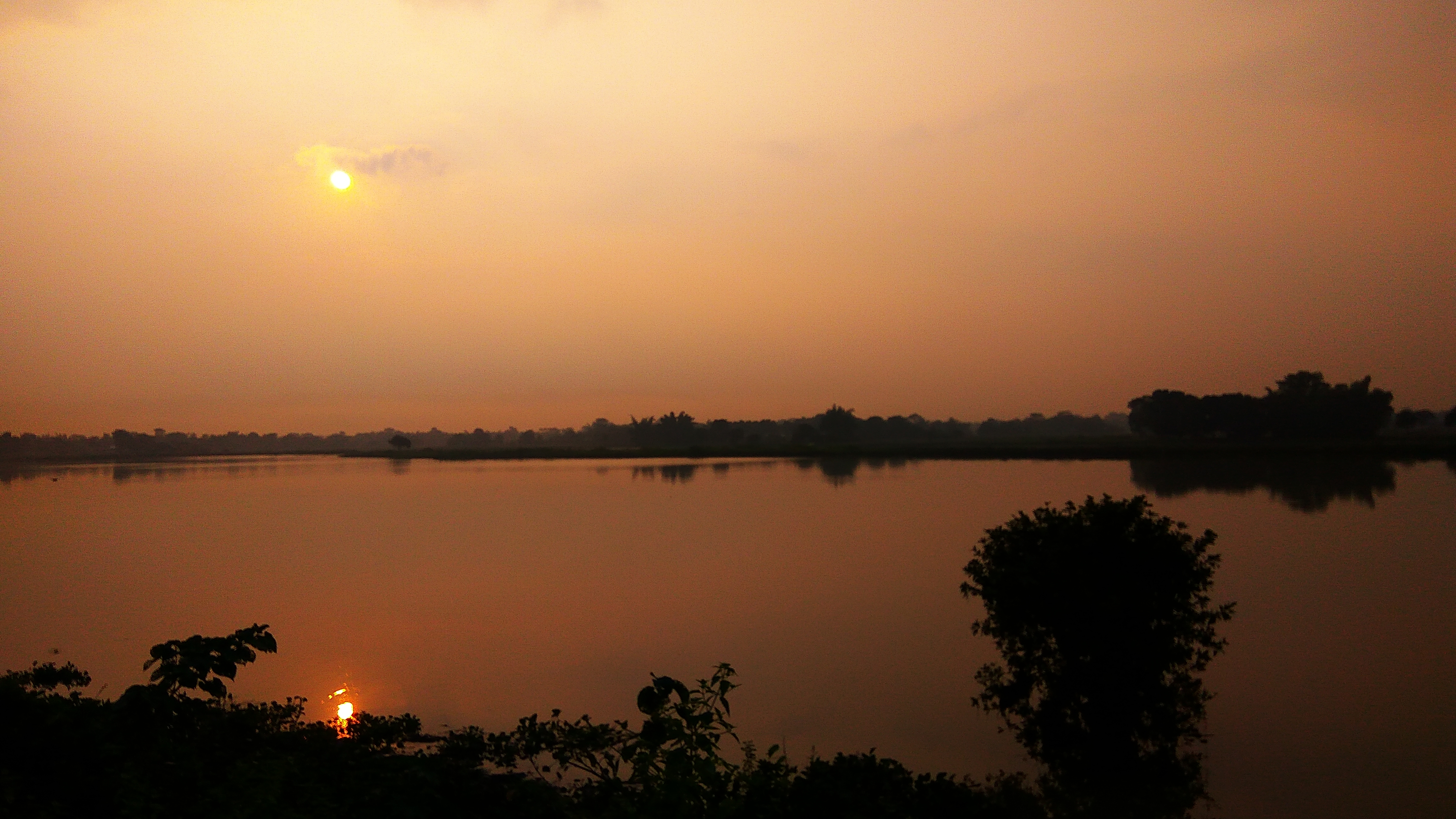
- Top: One Horned Rhino of Pobitora Wildlife Sanctuary, Bull Fight at Ahatguri, Preparation of smoked fish at Jonbeel Mela, Bottom: Saron Bil at Morigaon

- Location in Assam
- Country: India
- State: Assam
- Division: Central Assam
- Headquarters: Morigaon

Government
  - Lok Sabha constituencies: Nowgong
  - Vidhan Sabha constituencies: Jagiroad, Morigaon, Laharighat

Area
  - Total: 1,704 km^{2} (658 sq mi)

Population (2011)
  - Total: 957,423
  - Density: 561.9/km^{2} (1,455/sq mi)

Demographics
  - Literacy: 69.37%
  - Sex ratio: 974
- Time zone: UTC+05:30 (IST)
- ISO 3166 code: IN-AS
- Website: morigaon.gov.in

Morigaon district (Assamese: মৰিগাঁও জিলা) is an administrative district in the state of Assam in Northeastern India. The district headquarters are located at Morigaon. The district has a Muslim-majority population according to the 2011 Census of India.

== History ==
The history of Morigaon is obscure. A famous mythical ruler of the region was Arimatta, whose history is shrouded in mystery. After Arimatta's death, Jungal Balahu (a great Tiwa king), his son ruled over the region. Jongal Balahu was ultimately killed by the Kacharis with a bamboo spear near Kajalimukh.

The legend further goes on to say Jungal Balahu, to escape his pursuers, submerged himself in the Kolong river and emerged at Raha to quench his thirst and again dived here to emerge at Jagi. From this incident were derived the names of present-day Raha and Jagi.

The writing of Bhim Singh throws some light on the history of present day Morigaon town and its adjoining areas. This region was ruled independently by six rulers. During this time two princes from Darrang, Supradhvaj and Makardhvaj, fled from their homeland due to internal clashes by crossing the mighty Brahmaputra river and settled at Bahakajari. Later on, Supradhvaj married the daughter of Mangal Singh, the King of Baghara. Supradhvaj was then made the seventh king of the region, having an independent kingdom of his own.

During the days of Ahom general Lachit Borphukan, two other princes from Darrang, Ram Singh and Bhim Singh crossed the Brahmaputra in search of plain lands. After Bhim Singh settled down, Ram Singh left for his home. Bhim Singh was not liked by the local people, hence, he left Brahmaputra and settled down near Mori Beel. This place came to be known as Morigaon.

Morigaon became a fully-fledged district on 29 September 1989, when it was split from Nagaon district.

== Geography ==
Morigaon district occupies an area of 1,704 square kilometres (658 sq mi), comparatively equivalent to Samoa's Savai'i. The district is bordered to the north by the mighty Brahmaputra River, to the south by Karbi Anglong district, to the east by Nagaon district, and to the west by Kamrup district. Most of the area consists of an alluvial plain, intersected by numerous rivers and waterways, and scattered with various beels and marshes.

The Killing, Kolong and Kopili rivers flow through the southern part of the district. The Killing River meets the Kopili at Matiparbat, where the Kopili flows westward. The Kolong joins the Kopili at Jagi Dui Khuti Mukh, and together they flow into the Brahmaputra. The district is noted for its picturesque scenery, with the outer Himalayas visible to the north and lower hills with lush tropical vegetation to the west and south.

== Economy ==
The economy of Morigaon district is predominantly dependent on agriculture, with more than 90% of the population engaged in farming. The district has vast potential for the development of plantation and horticultural crops like rubber, coconut, banana, black pepper, and sericulture activities. The district has a total of 35 registered beel fisheries and 5 river fisheries. A total of seven eco hatcheries are present in the district.

The industrial scenario of the district is poor, with only one paper mill at Jagiroad and some fibre production units. The total number of registered SSI units in the district was 398 which are the lowest among all districts in the state.

In 2006, the Indian government named Morigaon one of the country's 250 most backward districts (out of a total of 640). It is one of the eleven districts in Assam currently receiving funds from the Backward Regions Grant Fund Programme (BRGF).

In 2024, Tata Group started the construction of the Tata Semiconductor Assembly and Test factory in Jagiroad at the defunct Nagaon Paper Mill.

== Administration ==
=== Divisions ===
There are three Assam Legislative Assembly constituencies in this district: Jagiroad, Morigaon, and Laharighat. Jagiroad is designated for Scheduled Castes. All three are part of Nagaon Lok Sabha constituency.

The Census of India divides Morigaon district into the following five subdistricts or circles: Bhuragaon, Laharighat, Morigaon, Mayong, and Mikirbheta. Each of these circles contains a large number of villages; for example Morigaon circle consists of one city and 162 villages. Among these, Ahaturi Natua Gaon in Morigaon circle is a large village, administered by a sarpanch, and has a population of 2951.

=== Towns and villages ===
- Bhuragaon
- Jagiroad
- Mayong
- Morigaon
- Natuagaon
- Patekibari

== Demographics ==
=== Population ===
Historical population
Year	Pop.	±% p.a.
1901	65,638	—
1911	76,034	+1.48%
1921	100,319	+2.81%
1931	141,801	+3.52%
1941	163,602	+1.44%
1951	223,561	+3.17%
1961	308,260	+3.26%
1971	423,901	+3.24%
1991	639,682	+2.08%
2001	776,256	+1.95%
2011	957,423	+2.12%

According to the 2011 census Morigaon district has a population of 957,853, roughly equal to the nation of Fiji, or the US state of Montana. This gives it a ranking of 455th in India (out of a total of 640). The district has a population density of 618 inhabitants per square kilometre (1,600/sq mi). Its population growth rate over the decade 2001-2011 was 23.39%. Morigaon has a sex ratio of 974 females for every 1000 males, and a literacy rate of 69.37%. Males and females constitute 485,328 and 472,525 respectively. 7.66% of the population lives in urban areas. Scheduled Castes and Scheduled Tribes make up 12.30% and 14.29% of the population respectively.

In the 2001 census of India, Morigaon District recorded increase of 21.35 percent to its population compared to 1991.

With regards to Sex Ratio in Morigaon, it stood at 974 per 1000 male compared to 2001 census figure of 946. The average national sex ratio in India is 940 as per latest reports of the Census 2011 Directorate.

In census enumeration, data regarding child under 0-6 age were also collected for all districts including Morigaon. There were total 159,088 children under age of 0-6 against 148,765 of 2001 census. Of total 159,088 male and female were 81,567 and 77,521 respectively. Child Sex Ratio as per census 2011 was 950 compared to 966 of census 2001. In 2011, Children under 0-6 formed 16.61 percent of Morigaon District compared to 19.16 percent of 2001. There was net change of -2.55 percent in this compared to previous census of India.

Morigaon district's population constituted 3.07 percent of Assam's population.

=== Religion ===
Religion in Morigaon district (2011)
1. Islam (52.6%)
2. Hinduism (47.1%)
3. Others (0.37%)

Islam is the religion of the majority community at 52.56% (503,257) according to the 2011 Census, followed by Hinduism at (451,882) 47.2%. According to the 1971 Census, Hindus were the majority in Morigaon district, forming 59.4% of the population, while Muslims were 40.4% at that time.

Population of circles by religion
Circle	Muslims	Hindus	Others
Mayong	36.29%	63.32%	0.39%
Bhuragaon	60.26%	39.56%	0.18%
Laharighat	91.26%	8.61%	0.13%
Morigaon	21.46%	78.27%	0.27%
Mikirbheta	48.36%	51.48%	0.16%

=== Languages ===
Languages spoken in Morigaon district (2011)
1. Assamese (73.0%)
2. Bengali (22.2%)
3. Hindi (1.41%)
4. Bodo (1.21%)
5. others (2.18%)

According to the 2011 census, 73.02% of the population speaks Assamese, followed by 22.18% Bengali, 1.41% Hindi and 1.21% Bodo speakers. 2.18% of the population speak other languages like Tiwa, Nepali, etc.

=== Literacy ===
Average literacy rate of Morigaon in 2011 was 69.37% compared to 58.53% in 2001. Mle and female literacy were 73.66 %and 64.99 %respectively. For the 2001 census, these figures stood at 65.15% and 51.51% in Morigaon District. Total literate in Morigaon District were 554,143 of which male and female were 297,422 and 256,721 respectively. In 2001, Morigaon District had 5,312,396 in its total region.

== Bio-diversity ==
=== Forests ===
There are three Reserved Forests constituted under the Assam Forest Regulation Act, 1891. These are Sunaikuchi, Khulahat, and Bura Mayong. There is also a wildlife sanctuary, the Pobitora Wildlife Sanctuary located in Mayong, which is famous for the Indian one horned Rhinoceros.
