= Kiran Bala Bora =

Freedom fighter, and social activist from Assam

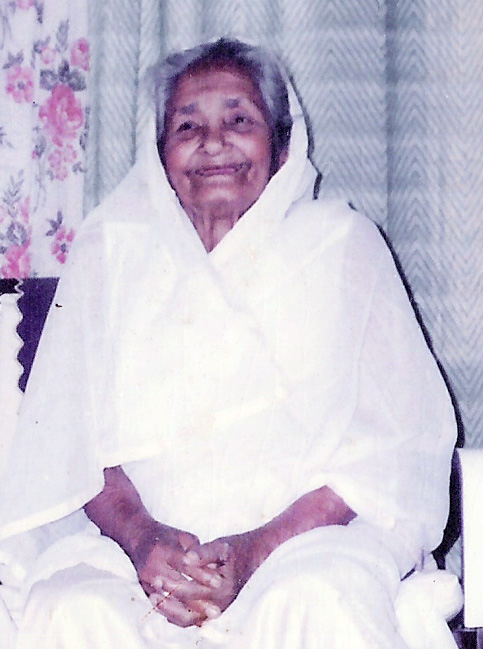
- Born: 1904; North Haiborgaon, Nagaon, Assam, India
- Died: January 1993 (aged 88–89); Panigaon Choiali, Nagaon, Assam, India
- Occupations: Freedom Fighter, Social Activist
- Years active: 1919–1947
- Known for: Social Reformer
- Spouse: Sanat Ram Bora
- Children: 6
- Parents: Kamal Chandra Pandit (father); Saroj Aidew (mother)

Kiran Bala Bora (1904 - 8 January 1993) was a freedom fighter and social activist born in Assam, India. She is known for her participation in the civil disobedience movements of the 1930s and 1940s, which contributed to the independence of India.

== Early life ==
Kiran Bala Bora was born in 1904 in the village of North Haiborgaon in the Nagaon district of Assam to Kamal Chandra Pandit, a teacher, and Saroj Aidew. Bora attended school until the 3rd grade, despite the opposition to sending women to school prevalent in Indian society at the time. At an early age, she married Saki Ram Lashkar of Kampur, Nagaon. After her husband's death, Bora moved back to her parents' home. During her teenage years, she gained interest in the revolutionary movements of the country.

== Contribution to India's Freedom Movement ==
=== The 1920s ===
The summer of 1920 saw the resurgence of the idea that India should gain independence from British rule, especially after the Jallianwala Bagh massacre. Led by Gandhi, hundreds of people participated in non-violent protests across India. Bora fundraised to help congress gain momentum in the northeastern part of India. She also worked alongside leaders like Poorna Chandra Sharma, Mahindhar Bora, Haladhar Bhuyan, and D. K. Barooah. During this time, she met Chandraprava Saikiani, a writer, social reformer, and freedom fighter from Assam. Bora established a close relationship with Saikiani and worked for social causes under her direction.

Bora boycotted the use of foreign goods, one of the objectives of the non-cooperation movement. During one protest, she burned valuable foreign goods from her own home. Instead of buying clothes manufactured in Europe, Bora started spinning cotton and making her own cloth. Bora also protested the use of narcotic substances such as opium and Bhang.

In 1929, the Lahore Congress resolved to celebrate 26 January 1930, as Purna swaraaj (Complete Independence) day. Accordingly, more than 400 women in Kaliabor, led in part by Bora, joined in the celebrations, in defiance of the British-Indian government. Police stopped the women from participating, and many were allegedly beaten up.

=== The 1930s ===
Bora was arrested by the British-Indian government several times. She fell severely ill on 7 February 1931 when she was in jail and was released after 4 months. In 1932, she was transferred to Shillong Jail, where she lived in dire conditions.

During this time, Kiran Bala met Ambika Kakathi Aidew, another freedom fighter from Assam. Aidew's daughter, Jagyashini Kakathi Aidew, had died and Ambika proposed that Kiran marry her son-in-law, Sanat Ram Bora. Kiran's father accepted Ambika's proposal and remarried his daughter while she was still involved in the freedom movement.

Sanat Ram Bora had five young children from his previous wife and lived in a joint family. While being the founder secretary of a newly established socio-religious organization Srimanta Sankara Sangha, Kiran handled the responsibility of her joint family, and served the devotees. Her husband supported her in her political life.

In the 1930s, Gandhi had started the Civil Disobedience Movement to end the British taxation of Indian salt. Bora promoted the civil movement to the villagers of Polaxoni (where her spouse, Sanat Ram Bora, lived) and continued her activities of collecting food and other relief items.

She preached about India's independence to the devotees who came to attend the Sangha at her husband's house. She also spread awareness about the social problems related to women in India, like child marriage, Sati, and women's education.

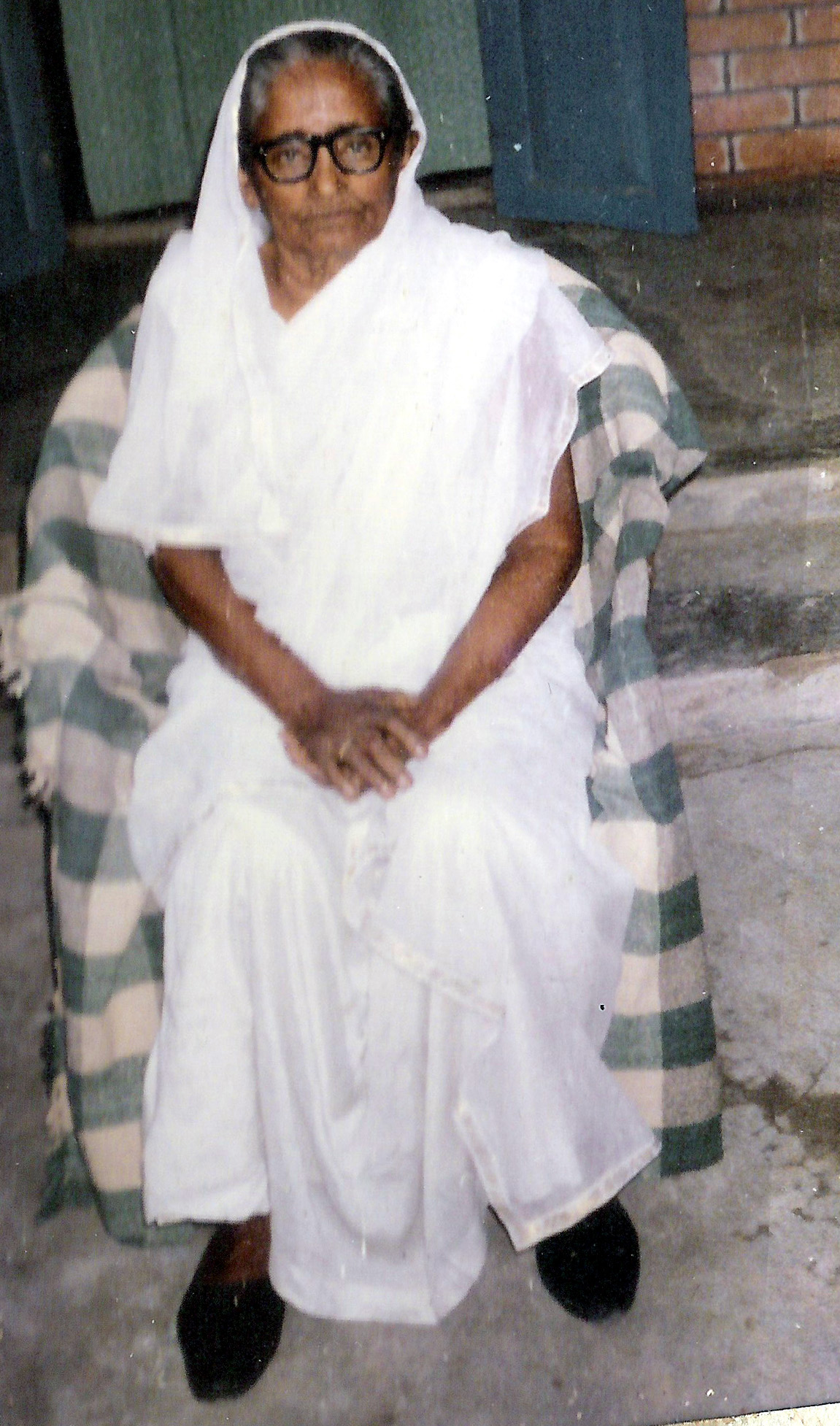
Kiran Bala Bora, freedom fighter of Indian Freedom movement

=== The 1940s ===
In 1942, the Quit India Movement was announced, and the British were asked to leave the country. "Do or Die" became the slogan of the movement. In response, the British colonial government initiated a crackdown on the movement, arresting tens of thousands of independence activists and keeping most of them imprisoned until 1945.

Bora protested the British crackdown, facing lathi charges and other actions by the police. She also went into hiding from the police.

== Post-independence ==
Bora was honored with a freedom fighter's pension by both the state and central governments of India.

Bora died on 8 January, 1993. She remained an active Srimanta Sankaradeva Sangha worker and devotee until her death.

== See also ==
- Indian independence movement
- List of Indian independence activists
- Srimanta Sankaradeva Sangha
