= Mayur Bora =

Indian writer

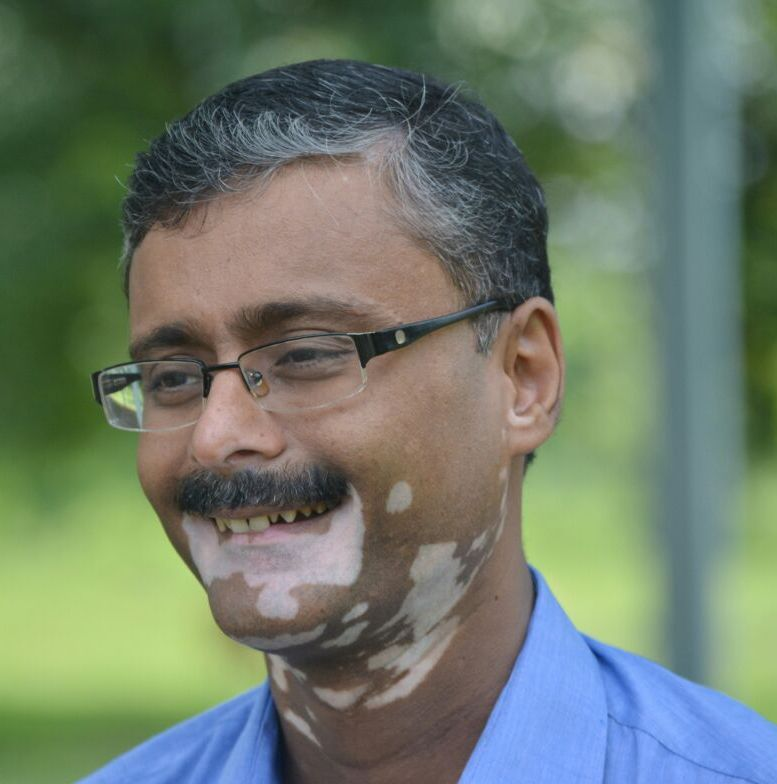
- Born: 10 June 1970 (age 56); Nagaon, Assam
- Occupations: Writer; Critic; Public Speaker
- Spouse: Ranjita Bora
- Children: Debasmit, Pracheeta.
- Parent(s): Bharat Ch. Bora, Banalata Bora

Signature
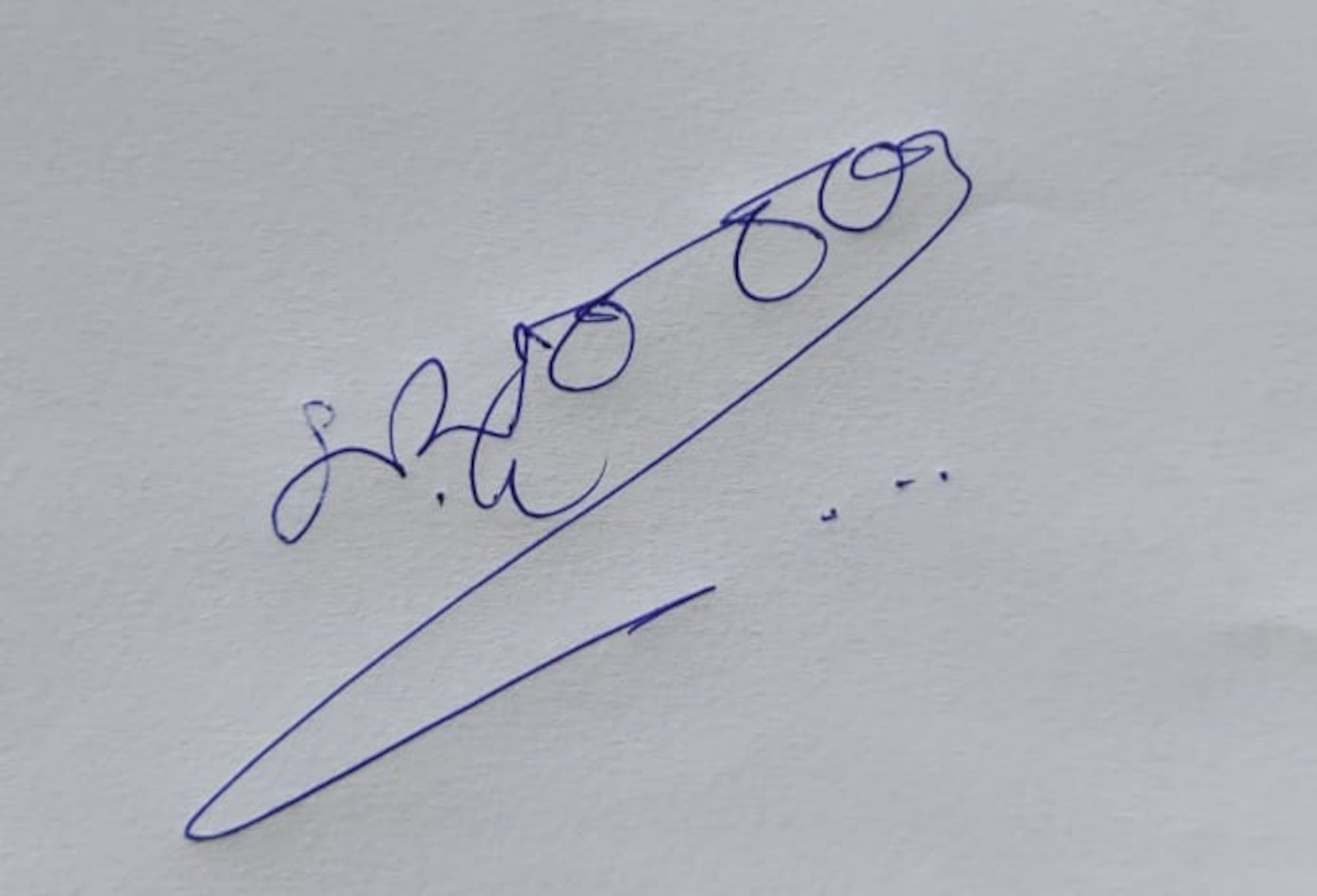

Mayur Bora is an Indian writer, critic and public speaker from Assam. Bora has 18 books to his credit, 16 in Assamese language, 1 in English and 1 book of English translation of noted litterateur Dilip Bora's short stories. In August 2026, Bora joined the University of Science and Technology Meghalaya (USTM) as an Author-in-Residence and Director of its Centre for Competitive Examinations (CCE). His responsibilities include mentoring students in writing, critical thinking, communication and preparation for competitive examinations.

Mayur Bora's Speech in Sahitya Akademi's All India Writers' Meet in Agartala

== Early life and education ==
Mayur Bora was born at Nagaon on June 10, 1970 to Bharat Chandra Bora and Banalata Bora. His paternal grandfather - Sanat Ram Bora was the founding General Secretary of the Srimanta Sankaradeva Sangha, one of the largest socio-cultural and religious organizations of North East India. Mayur Bora's paternal grandmother - Kiranbala Bora actively participated in India's Freedom Struggle and was imprisoned by the British for her unshakable commitment to the Gandhian struggle based on the principle of truth and non-violence.

Mayur Bora started his schooling at Sacred Heart School, Guwahati. But after a few months, his parents took a decision to enroll himself in an Assamese medium school and accordingly, he was shifted to Nizarapar LP School. After securing 1st position in the LP Scholarship examination in undivided Kamrup district, he took admission in the oldest school of Assam - Cotton Collegiate Higher Secondary School. After HSLC examination in 1987, he got himself enrolled in Cotton College (now Cotton University) and passed higher secondary examination in science stream in 1989.

Thereafter, despite being selected to pursue engineering in several NITs, he decided to go to Delhi to pursue further studies in humanities. Bora completed his graduation in 1993 from Hans Raj College under the University of Delhi with honours in History. His pass subjects in BA were English, Assamese and Philosophy.

He got the first rank in the Transmission Executive examination conducted by the Staff Selection Commission and was asked to join at All India Radio, Haflong. But before he could join there, he also got the job of an Assistant Manager in the apex level banking institution of the country - National Bank for Agriculture and Rural Development (NABARD) based on his performance in an all-India level competitive examination consisting of preliminary and mains examinations followed by a personality test. He started his banking career at the Lucknow Regional Office of NABARD. Subsequently he served at Guwahati, Chandigarh, Jorhat and Pune Regional Offices of NABARD. On completion of more than 25 years of service in NABARD, Bora took voluntary retirement from Pune on March 31, 2021. He was holding the post of Deputy General Manager at the time of his early retirement. At the time of retirement, he was also on the board of Nagpur based Regional Rural Bank - Vidarbha Konkan Gramin Bank as a NABARD nominated Director. During his service life, Mayur Bora was sent on deputation by NABARD to work as a Faculty Member in Indian Institute of Bank Management, Guwahati from 2015 to 2019. He is also a Certified Associate of Indian Institute of Banking and Finance (IIBF)

== Career ==
Bora began his professional career in the banking and financial sector after being selected for the National Bank for Agriculture and Rural Development (NABARD). He served in various capacities at NABARD for more than 25 years and took voluntary retirement in 2021 as a Deputy General Manager. During his career, he served at several NABARD regional offices and was also deputed as a faculty member at the Indian Institute of Bank Management, Guwahati, from 2015 to 2019.

After his retirement from NABARD, Bora was associated with interview boards for the Assam Public Service Commission's Combined Competitive Examination and the Institute of Banking Personnel Selection's Probationary Officers examination. He has also been associated with Gauhati University as a Visiting Professor.

In August 2026, Bora joined the University of Science and Technology Meghalaya (USTM) as an Author-in-Residence and Director of the university's Centre for Competitive Examinations (CCE). In this capacity, he is involved in mentoring students in writing, critical thinking, communication and preparation for competitive examinations. His activities at the university also include guidance in public speaking, articulation and interview preparation.

The Centre for Competitive Examination at USTM was established in 2012 and operates programmes including NET Forum, GATE Forum and a Competitive Examination Cell for banking and other public-sector examinations.

== Literary Journey ==
Mayur Bora started writing in Assamese in the year 1982 while he was in class VI in the children's magazine - 'Xofura' edited by Dr Bhabendra Nath Saikia. His first article was on the life and works of one of the greatest Assamese of all times - Anundoram Borooah. Thereafter he also started writing in other newspapers and periodicals - Asom Bani and Prohori. While studying in Cotton College (now Cotton University) from 1987 to 1989, he started writing in English. Some of his pieces on Westernization, Casteism and Dr Bhupen Hazarika's teleserial - Lohit Kinare appeared in The Sentinel, the prominent English daily of Assam.

He has written 18 books so far. Out of those, 16 are in Assamese, one in English and one book of translation in which noted writer and retired DGP Dilip Borah's 12 Assamese short stories were rendered into English by Mayur Bora.

== Bibliography ==
- Anubhabar Pratidhwani
- Pothobhrosto Hoisey Neki Sankar Sangha
- All Those Yearnings
- Protyashar Protilipi
- Brahmonyobador Koliwa Dawar aru Axom
- Abegor Kuwali Phali
- Marxei Bojaley Neki Communismor Mrityughonta
- Chetonar Spondon
- Jatived Protha Aru Sankaradeva
- Chintar Bhognanxo
- Hindu Dharmat Iswar Aru Nastikota
- Bhabonar Swaralipi
- Random Reflections
- Axomiya Swabhimanor Ruprekha
- Sirodin Axomiya
- Axomiyatwar Jyoti
- Pahora Manik Bisari
- Kune Ghurai Dibo Amar Oxygen

== Awards ==
- Sahitya Sabha Award
- Karmabir Chandranath Sharma Award
- Dr. Moidul Islam Bora Memorial Award
- Bhimbar Deuri Award, 2022
- Best Bilingual Speaker Award, 2023
- Assam Sahitya Sabha President's Special Award for 'Chirodin Asomiya' (Pathshala Session, 2025)
- March 15, 2025, he was awarded the ‘Katha-Baibhav Award’ by Natun Sur Prakashan, Lakhimpur
- 3rd Guwahati Trade Fair Excellence Award 2026
