= Nirode Kumar Barooah =

Indo-German historian and author

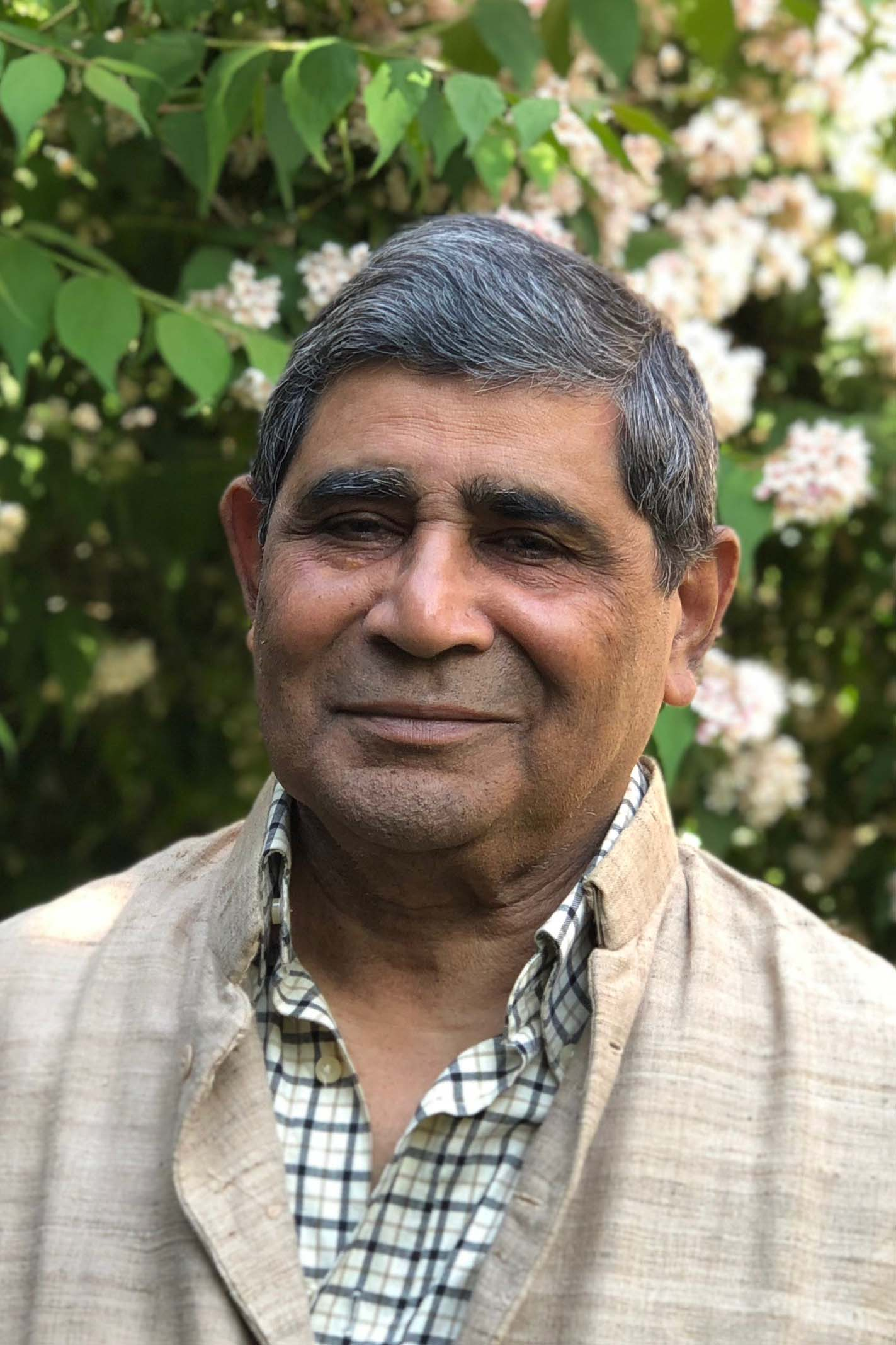
Photo of Nirode Kumar Barooah in the garden of his house in Cologne, 2018

Nirode Kumar Barooah (born 1 August 1937 in Nagaon) is an Indo-German historian who publishes mainly on topics of Indo-German relations as well as modern Indian history especially that of the British administration in the early 19th century with a special focus on Northeast India. He is one of the most influential historians of Assamese history.

== Life ==
He was born on August 1, 1937, to Kusum Barooah and Dr. Lalit Kumar Barooah. His father was a medical doctor and co-founder of Srimanta Sankar Mission and author of numerous works on folk medicine, family planning and child care.

In 1967, while working as a research assistant at the University of Heidelberg, he met his future wife, Elisabeth Becher. After their marriage in 1971, they moved their center of life to Cologne. His marriage to Elisabeth produced two daughters.

== Education and career ==
He started his academic career in 1955 with a bachelor's degree in art from Cotton College, Guwahati. He then completed his Bachelor's, Master's and Bachelor of Laws degrees from University of Benares from 1955 to 1961.

In 1961, he went to School of Oriental and African Studies in London as a research student in modern Indian history. His research area was the ideas of administration under British rule in India in the early 19th century, with special reference to northeast India.

In 1964, he received his Ph.D. with a dissertation on David Scott, a Scottish officer in the East India Company, which was first published in 1970 and appeared in a second, revised edition in 2015.

From 1965 to 1971, he taught modern history at the University of Delhi. During his teaching career, he conducted extensive research on the Indian freedom movement with special reference to Assam.

His move to Germany in 1971 simultaneously focused his attention on a new subject area: Indo-German relations in the period from 1885 to 1939, and his subsequent years of research in German archives enabled him to publish several books and research papers in this field.

In Germany, Barooah worked as a research associate at the universities in Bonn and Heidelberg and served for many years as a consultant for the Deutsche Gesellschaft für technische Zusammenarbeit (now Deutsche Gesellschaft für Internationale Zusammenarbeit).

In 2021, Nirode Kumar Barooah was awarded the Lokapriya Gopinath Bardoloi Award for National Integration and National Contribution by the Indian state of Assam for his extensive life's work on the history of Assam, which was presented to him on October 3, 2021 by Indian Vice President Venkaiah Naidu in Guwahati.

== Literature ==
English

- David Scott in North-East India: A study in British Paternalism. Munshiram Manoharlal, Delhi 1970, ISBN 978 9 381 13953 0.
- India and the Official Germany 1884 to 1914. Peter Lang AG, Internationaler Verlag der Wissenschaften, Frankfurt 1977, ISBN 978-3-261-02102-1.
- Chatto: The Life And Times Of An Anti-imperialist In Europe. Oxford University Press, Delhi 2004, ISBN 978-0-195-66547-5.
- Gopinath Bardoloi, 'The Assam Problem' and Nehru's Centre. Bhabani Books, Guwahati 2010, ISBN 978-9-380-39053-6.
- Franz Josef Furtwänger: A German Trade Union Internationalist's extraordinary engagement with India. Books on Demand 2015, ISBN 978-3-734-74308-5. (co-authored with his wife Elisabeth Barooah).
- Germany and the Indians: Between the Wars. Books on Demand 2018, ISBN 978-3-752-82046-1.

Assamese

- Axomia Jati Gathanat Gopinath Bardoloi. The Book Nook, Nagaon 2021.
- Axomat Jawaharlal Nwherur Bipajyayi Prabhab.The Book Nook, Nagaon 2022.

== Writings and research papers ==
English

- Gopinath Bardoloi: Indian Constitution and Centre-Assam relations, 1940-1950. Publication Board, Assam, 1990.

Assamese

- Political Life of Dr. Bhubaneswar Barooah, a close friend of Bardoloi and the President of Kamrup District Congress.
- Mohini Kolon Chabi, a critique of the so-called Marxists' Writings on Assam and Bardoloi.
- Bardoloi Dinlekha, Vol. 1 (Diaries of Gopinath Bardoloi).
- Bardoloi Dinlekha, Vol. 2 (Diaries of Gopinath Bardoloi).
- Ejon Satyagrahir Ranjiti: The Political Life of Bardoloi (Life of a Satyagrahi).
- Assamia Jathigathanat Gopinath Bardoloi (Bardoloi The Creator of Assamese Unity).
- Mohini Kolar Chabi (Historical debates).
- Bhimkarma Doctor Lalit Kumar Barooah (Biography).
- Ajatsatru Jananeta Bhubaneswar Barooah (Biography).
- Europiyo Mosaic (A collection of journalistic articles on European themes).
- Poschim Kala (on Western Art).

== Honors and awards ==
- Lokapriya Gopinath Bardoloi Award for National Integration and National Contribution. Guwahati 2021.
