= Bharali Namghar =

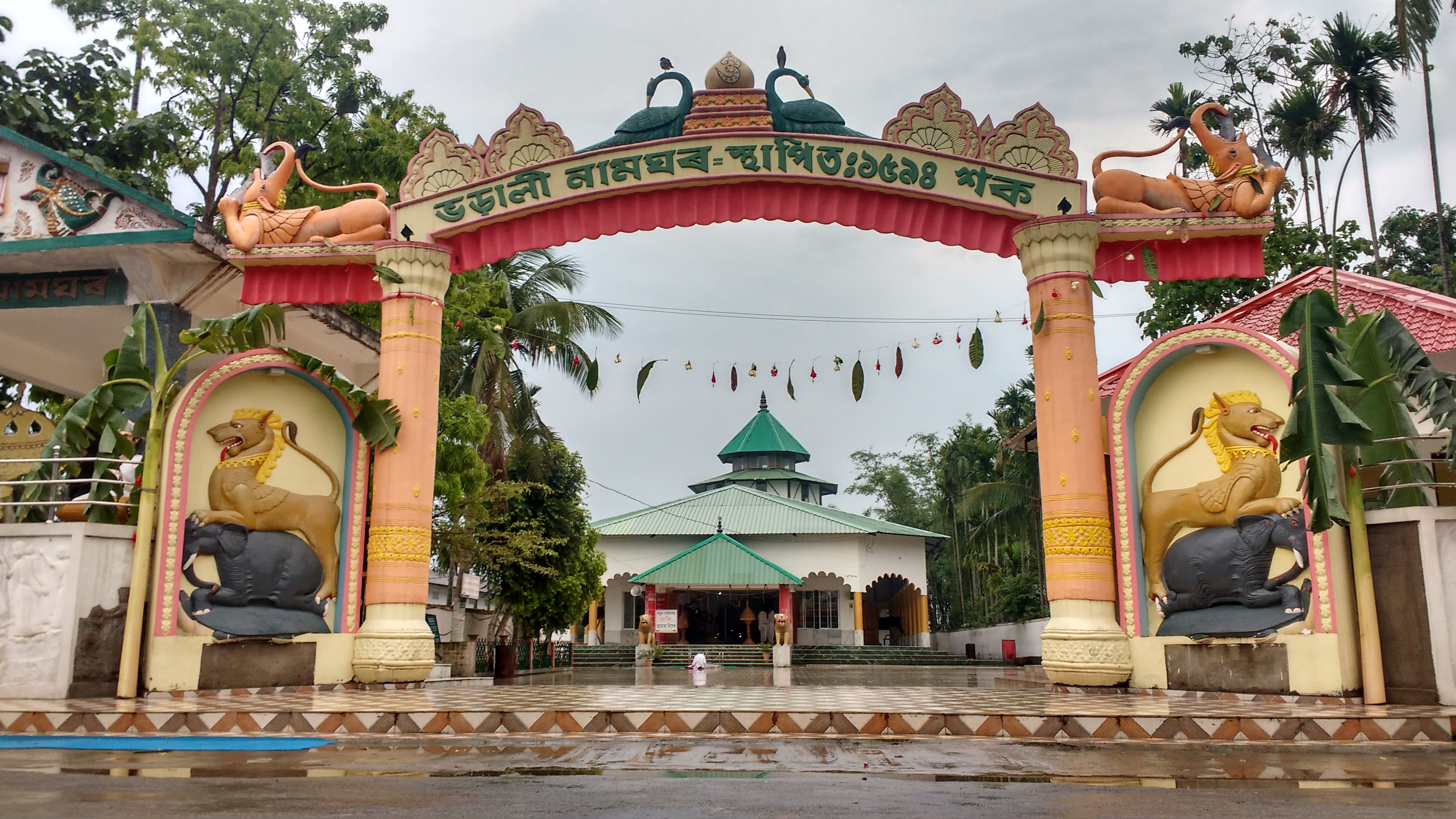
Bharali Namghar

Bharali Namghar (Assamese: ভঁৰালী নামঘৰ) is a temple situated in Bharali village, India. Bharali is approximately 2 km away from Hatbor, a place of historical importance under the Kaliabor subdivision in the Nagaon district, Assam in India. People from the Nagaon district are mostly agriculture oriented and are guided by rich Sattria (Eksarana religion) culture.

== History ==
For about 150 to 200 years Bharali Namghar was situated in the then 'Bamgaon', currently known as 'Daulpukhuri'. Bapuram Deo of Balisatra took the initiative in establishing the Namghar. The Namghar was burnt down by the Burmese Army (during the Burmese invasion of Assam between 1817 and 1826). Having no other option, the villagers left the place and re-established themselves in Bharali Gaon. Accordingly, the Namghar (popularly known as Bharali Namghar) came into being.

One of the interesting aspects of the Bharali Namghar is its 'Laikhuta' (main pillar), known as the Tulsi Khuta. Although not made from the holy basil plant (tulsi), the pillar is symbolically dedicated to it, highlighting the sacred role of Tulsi in the Vaishnavite tradition. There are faiths and beliefs about the Laikhuta and preserved well near 'Simhasana' or 'Guruasana'. It is believed that the Bharali Namghar is the holy place to visit for fulfilling wishes. The local seniors used to say that the Namghar is the rest house of 'Burha Dangoria' (a holy sprit).

== Infrastructure ==
The infrastructure of Bharali Namghar has totally changed with time. With the help of local people and devotees from different places bamboo poles, thatched roof, mud floor are replaced with cement pillar, tin and ceiling, modern floor style respectively. Keeping in view the increasing number of devotees, now the facilities of the washroom, rest house, guest house, banquet hall, auditorium, etc. are provided by the Namghar managing committee. The finance is properly and strictly managed by the committee.

== Cultural Festival ==
Maghi Purnima or Makar Sankranti is an auspicious day. On this day thousands of devotees visit Bharali Namghar to fulfill their wishes . A lot of devotees come to the Namghar especially in the sacred month of Bhado (August -September) and Maagh (January–February). Spirituality lies in the sound of Doba and Borkaah(instruments to play during prayer) that removes negative power and welcomes the positive. To perform 'Naam-Prasanga'(communal prayer) and 'Bhaona' (theatrical performance) in Srimanta Sankardeva(Vaishnava guru) Tithi (observatory day) and Shree Shree Madavdeva (Vaishnava guru and disciple of Srimanta Sankardev)Tithi is a tradition in Bharali Namghar. It is said that if a child is unable to walk in time people offer bamboo stick to the Namghar, if someone lost his cow people offer Diya (oil lamp), as a remedy of late marriage devotees visit with Diya and Sarai (raw fruits, Maah -Prasad as offering). Individuals can feel the existence of divine power in the Namghar.

== Image Gallery ==
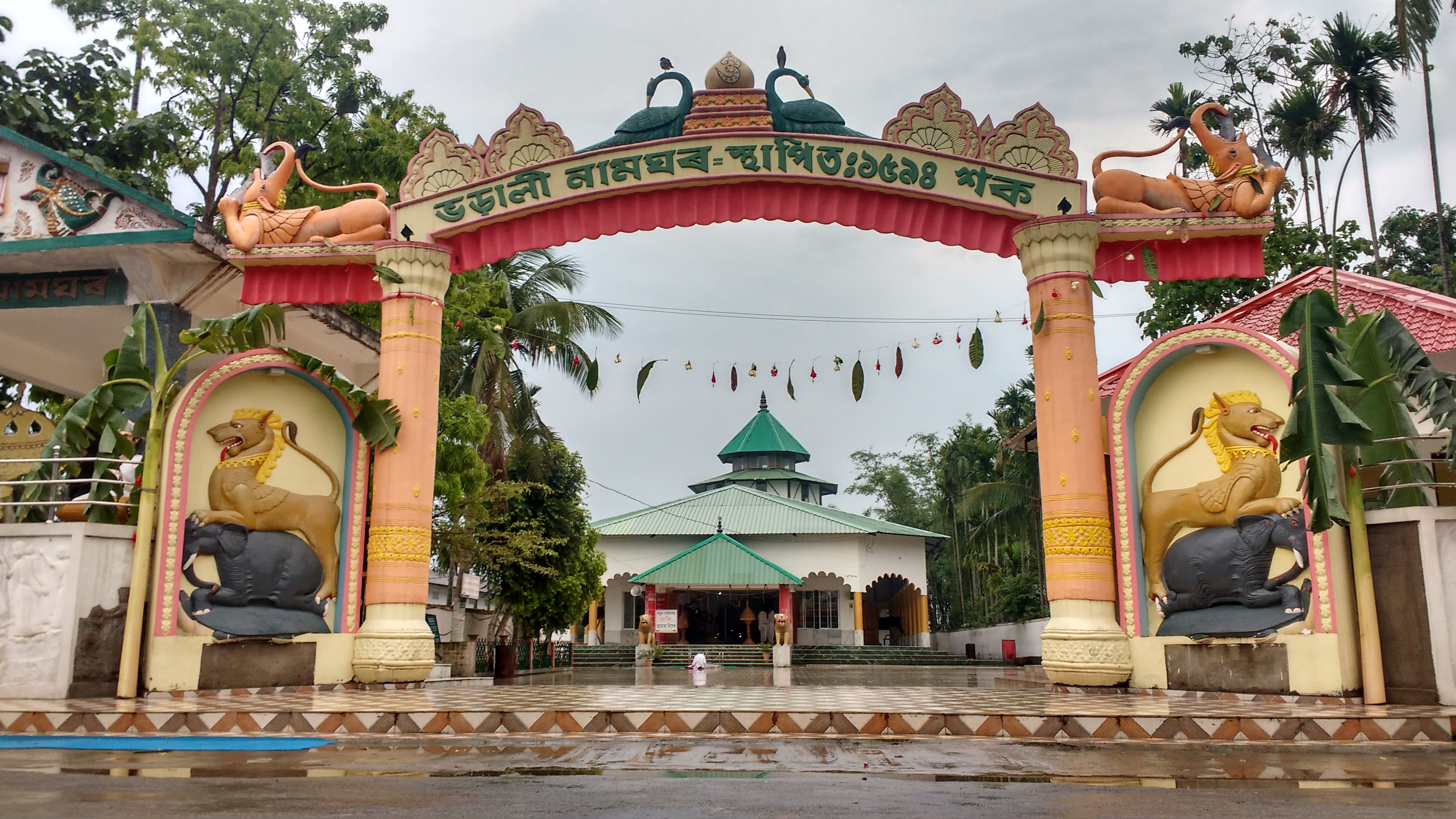
Entrance Gate of Bharali Namghar

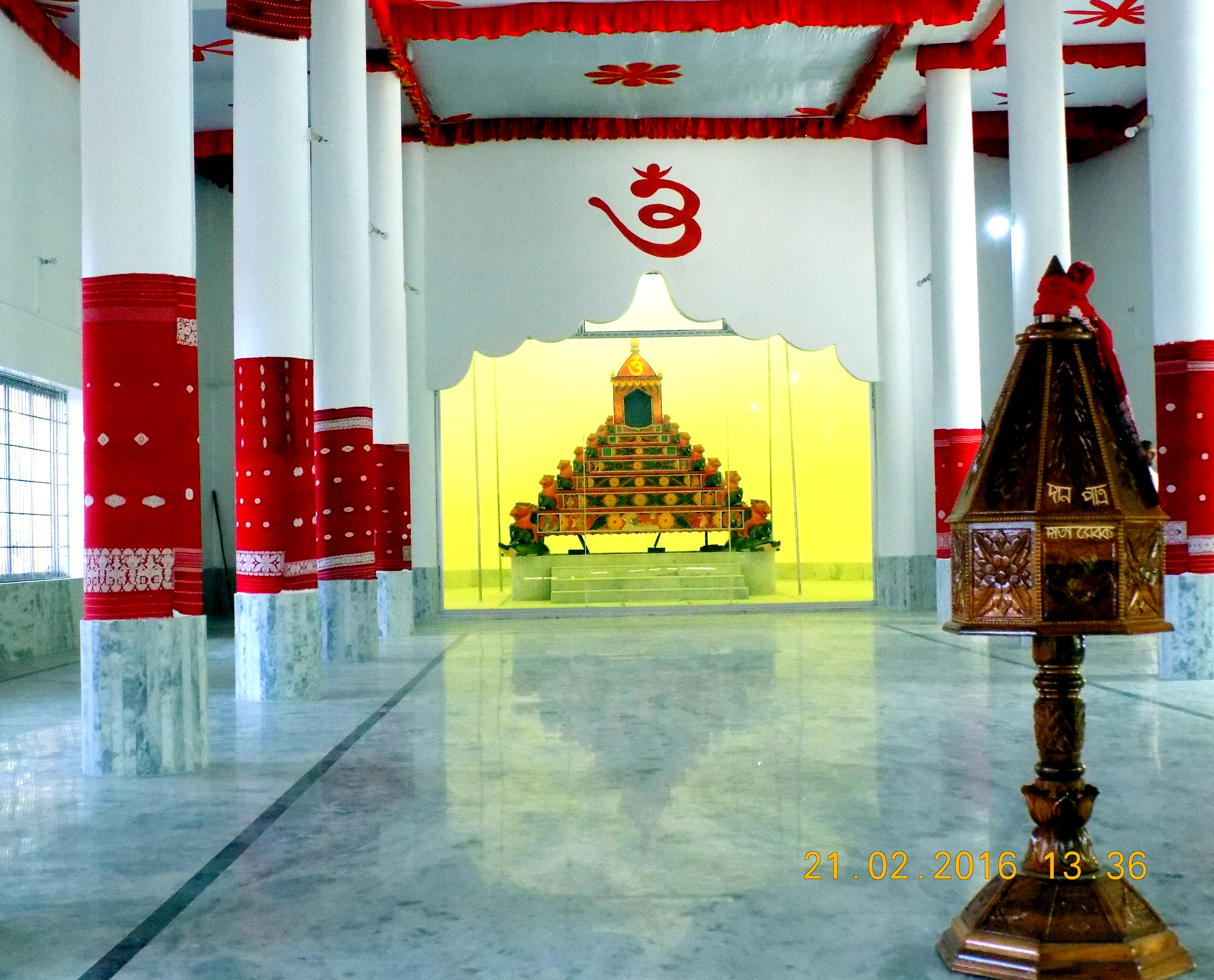
Namghar Monikut

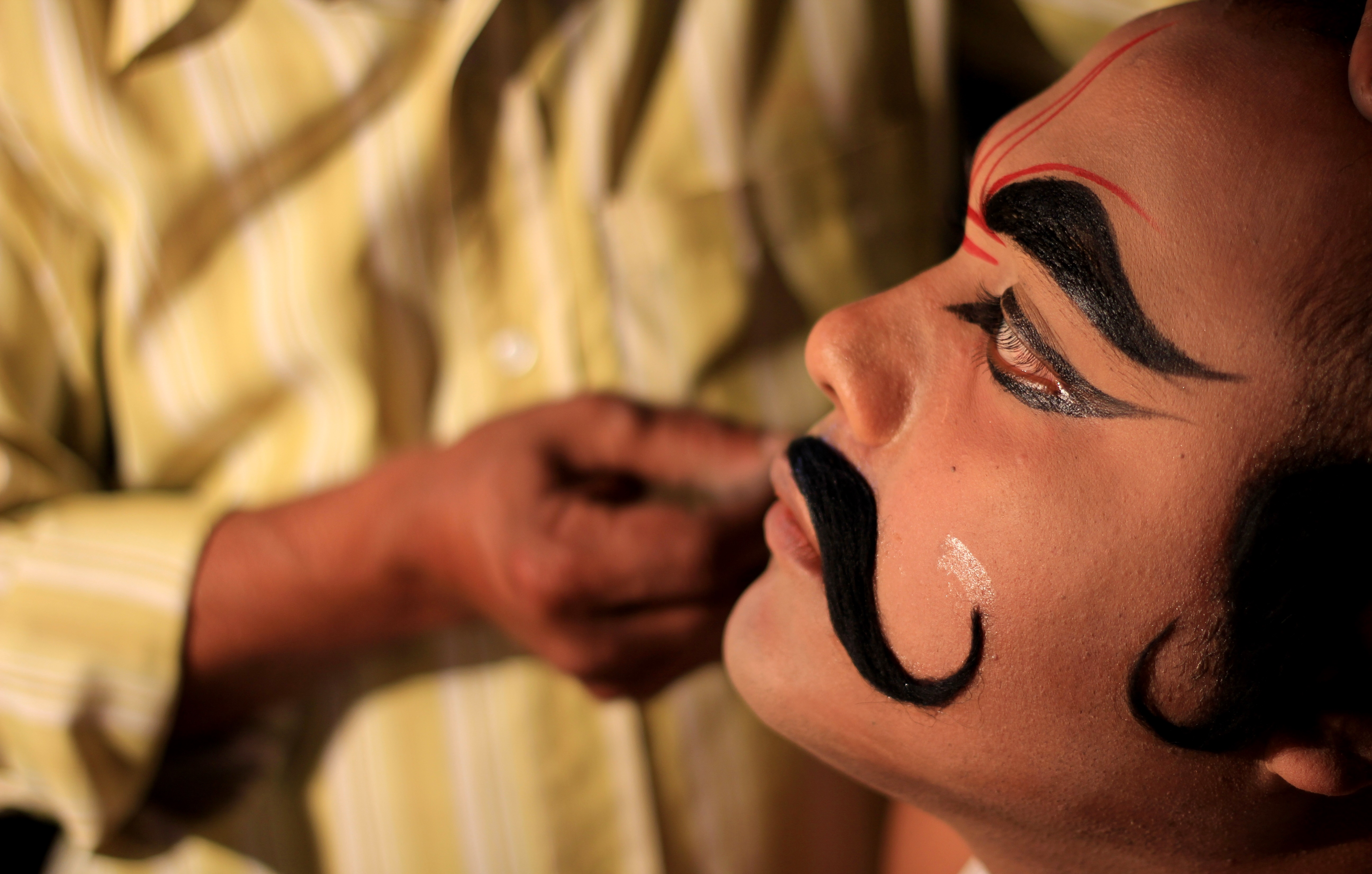
Artist applying makeup for Bhaona

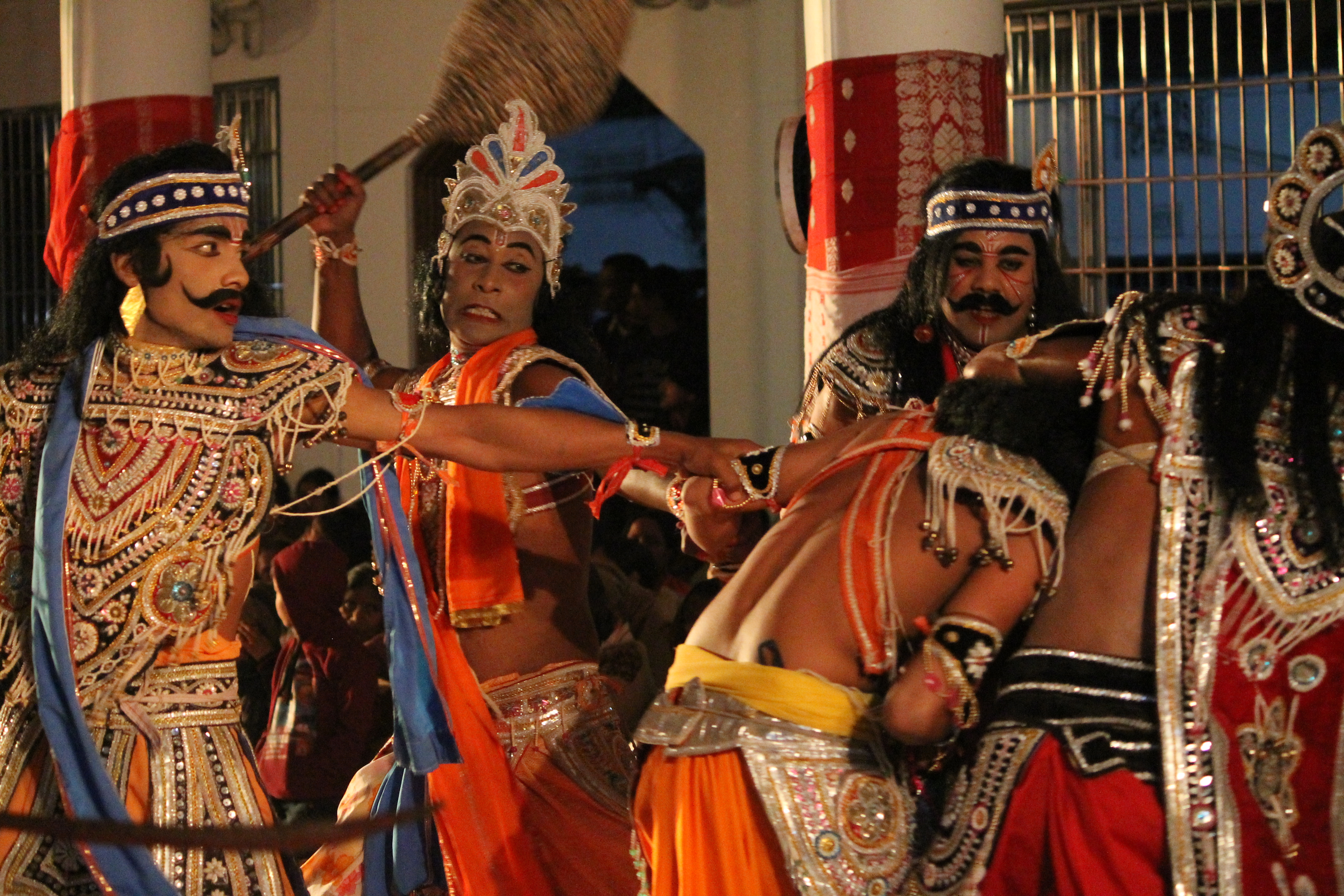
Fighting Scene @ Bhaona

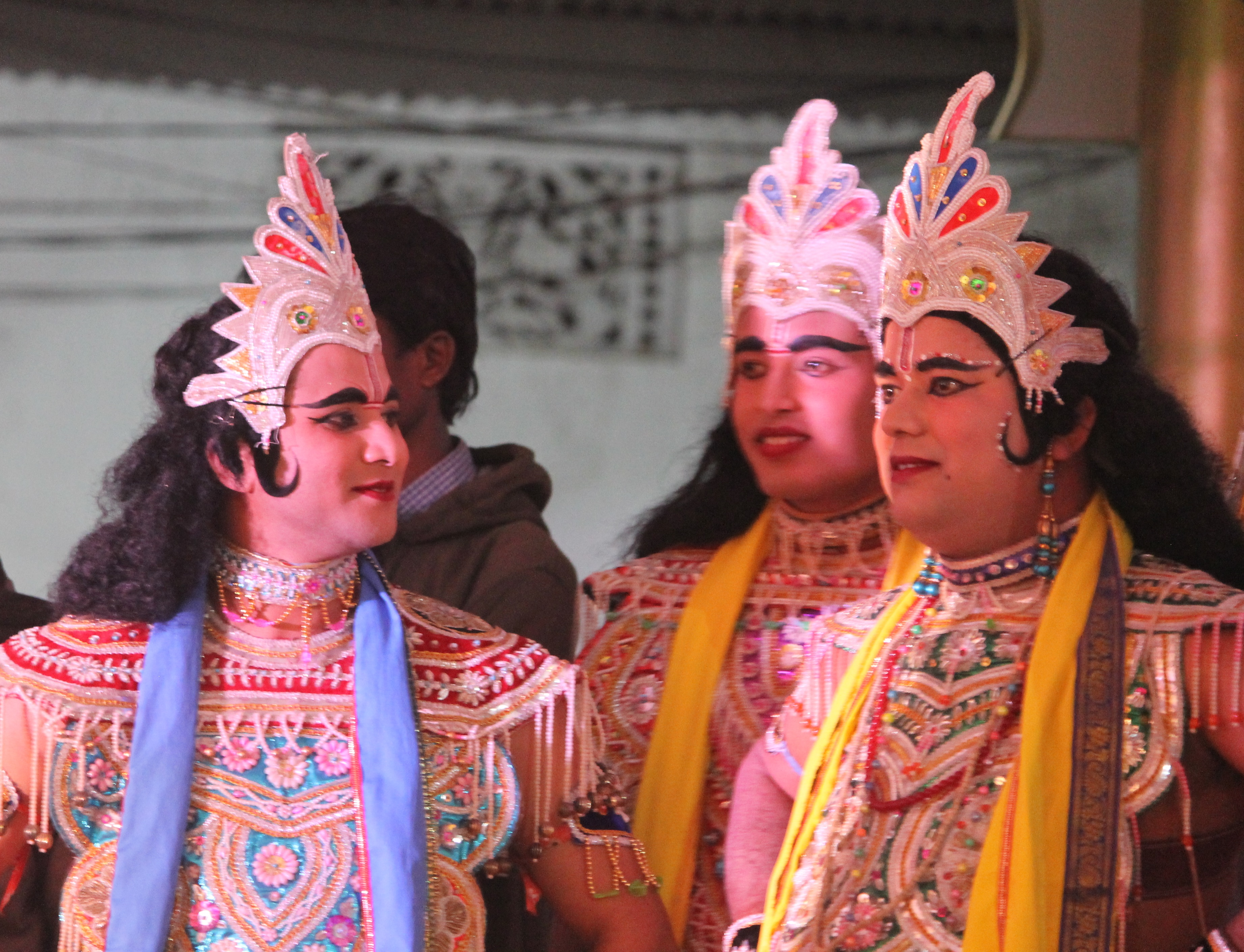
Actors Performing Bhaona
