= Hatbor =

Hatbor is a small town in Nagaon district, Assam under Kaliabor sub division.
