= Srimanta Sankaradeva Sangha =

Largest Socio-religious Organization in Assam

- Founded: 1930; 95 years ago
- Type: Religious/Socio-Cultural/Non-profit organisation
- Headquarters: Nagaon
- Location: Spreading all over Assam and parts of Arunachal Pradesh, Meghalaya and West Bengal, India
- Official language: Assamese, English
- Podadhikaar: Dr.Bhabendra Nath Deka
- Districts: 56
- Website: srimantasankaradevasangha.net

The Srimanta Sankaradeva Sangha, established in 1930, is the largest socio-religious organization in Assam.

== History ==
The beginning of the twentieth century saw the onset of different types of movements in Assam. It was a movement of the search for truth, where some revolutionary intellectuals took the lead. These people participated in the freedom movement led by Mahatma Gandhi. In the true Gandhian spirit they initiated a reform movement in this region. They tried to remove superstitions prevalent in society. They realized that the message of Sankardev and Madhavdev, two medieval saints, was the only path to redeem the society from the domination of high caste people as well regressive practices. Though Srimanta Sankaradeva (1449-1568 AD) had preached an egalitarian ideology in the fifteenth century itself, some people with vested interests had infiltrated into the Satra institution and entrenched themselves as sole custodians of the order. They even introduced the caste barrier in some places, contrary to the concept preached by their founder. The first person, who took his mighty pen to fight these evils was Lakshminath Bezbaroa, the great litterateur of modern Assam. He had come to know about the life and works of Srimanta Sankaradeva from the hagiography authored by his father Dinanath Bezbarooah. Lakshminath Bezbarooah, the pioneer short story writer, wrote incessantly about the ideology of Srimanta Sankaradeva in his philosophical books and articles. He gave discourses about the saint outside Assam, especially in Baroda.

While the intellectual giants like Lakshminath Bezbarooah were fighting the social evils, many activities were going on at that time at the grass-root level also in Assam. Some small organizations like Prarthana Sabha, Jnanmalini Sabha etc. held study circles, Kirtana-ghosha reading sessions, religious seminars etc. in nooks and corners of the state. Such activities took place at Barapujiya of Marigaon district, Kaliabor, Palasoni etc. of Nagaon district, Dhekiyal of Golaghat district, and later at Sualkuchi of Kamrup district. But the organizers of these activities did not have any co-relation among themselves. So an integrated effort had not come into being. This became possible when two persons, Ramakanta Muktiar and Haladhar Bhuyan came together at Nagaon.

This historic meeting took place in 1928 on the premises of Biren Mahanta, the then chairman of Nagaon Municipal Board. Ramakanta Muktiar had already been advising people to remove the malaise, which had crept into the Eka Sarana Nama Dharma preached by Srimanta Sankaradeva in the fifteenth century. Haladhar Bhuyan advised him to do it in an organized method. It was then decided that a permanent publicity centre should be set up. Muktiar used to move around on a bicycle. Thus he came to know about an organization named Jnanmalini Sabha at Palasoni, eight kilometres away from the Nagaon town on the Eastern side. As the members of Jnanmalini Sabha promised assistance to Muktiar in his objectives, he set up a permanent publicity centre there in consultation with Haladhar Bhuyan. People in different places of Assam wholeheartedly supported it and joined this effort. Eventually, the publicity centre was named Sankara Sangha in 1930. Actually, there had been a revival of reform activities of Eka Sarana Nama Dharma all over the state from 1909-to 1910. All those scattered units now came together, under the umbrella of Sankara Sangha as it showed a ray of hope to them that reform activities will actually gather momentum.

The Sankara Sangha was formed with the active help of the residents of Ouana village, Karaioni village, Lataimari village etc. near Palasoni village. Haladhar Bhuyan formed a local management committee with these people for the organizational works. The president and secretary of this committee were Manipad Bora of Ouana village and Sanatram Bora of Palasoni village. This method was continued in Sankara Sangha even in the later periods. It is a fully democratic organization, just as Srimanta Sankaradeva had practised the religion in the fifteenth century. One or more villages under the Sankara Sangha have one such committee, which is known as Prathamic Samiti (primary committee). The committee headed by Manipad Bora was the first-ever Prathamic Samiti. Presently the Srimanta Sankaradeva Sangha has 5,672 Prathamic Samiti, which itself is a record for any religious organization. Sankara Sangha convened a state-level conference in 1932 AD at Palasoni. Moreover, annual conferences were also held at the district level regularly till 1935 AD. These were however confined to the Nagaon district at that time. The first-ever state-level committee was formed on February 4, 1934 AD in Sankaradeva Mandir premises of Nagaon town. Eminent Sanskrit scholar Bhuban Chandra Bhuyan played a crucial role in the formation of this state-level body. He had already defeated the opponents of Eka Sarana Nama Dharma in fiery debates at different places.

The fourth conference held on April 21, 1935 AD in Nagaon town was presided over by Nilamani Phukan, a great litterateur, as Padadhikar. He suggested a change in the name of the organization from Sankara Sangha to Sri Sri Sankaradeva Sangha. Accordingly, the name of the organization was changed to Sri Sri Sankaradeva Sangha. Later this name was changed yet again in the conference held in North Lakhimpur in 1970 AD when it became Srimanta Sankaradeva Sangha. A distinguished scholar, Upendra Chandra Adhikari also was present in the 1935 session. Professor V. P Joshi, the founder of Arya Samaj participated in that conference and expressed support to the Sangha. The formation of the Sangha had a massive impact all over the state. Many debates were organized in different places. The followers of Eka Sarana Nama Dharma established the true philosophy of Srimanta Sankaradeva in these debates. They had to face stiff opposition from the priest community over the commemoration function of the dead. The priests opposed the purification on the eleventh day itself merely by chanting God’s name. One such debate was held at Phulaguri near Nagaon town on December 28 of 1933 AD. The priests fielded as many as 18 Sanskrit scholars. The supporters of Eka Sarana Nama Dharma were represented by Bhuban Chandra Bhuyan, the erudite Sanskrit scholar. This debate was presided over by Lakshminarayana Shastri, the then Principal of Cotton College. The futility of Karmakanda was proved in this debate. Similar debates were held at different places in the Nagaon district like Juria, Pathori, Kaliabor etc. There were also debates at Balipet in Kamrup district, Bogidol in Sivasagar district, Titabor, Borhola etc. in Jorhat district and many places in Golaghat district. The Balipet debate took place between the followers of Eka Sarana Nama Dharma and the Gouriya scholars. There was a marathon debate for long twenty-three days in Barpeta. The arguments offered by Bhuban Chandra Bhuyan were accepted in all these debates. It may be mentioned that all these debates ensued from one particular issue. The mother of Jogendra Nath Barua, a judge in Golaghat had expired. Thereupon Barua procured a letter of recommendation from the Satradhikar of Garmur Satra that he could get the commemoration service done by Nama-Prasanga. This letter was drafted by Gopika Ballabh Goswami in consultation with Bhuban Chandra Bhuyan. Barua completed the service accordingly. But it led to massive turmoil all over the state. Bhuban Chandra Bhuyan successfully defended it in all debates. The supremacy of Nama-Prasanga was thereby established.

The first annual conference of the Sangha outside the Nagaon district was held in 1936 AD at Sualkuchi. It was presided over by Dambarudhar Barua. The next year the conference was again held in Nagaon at Kalongpar. Thereafter the annual sessions remained low key affairs due to the freedom struggle, which had risen to a crescendo. Most of the leading activists of the Sangha had gone to jail. But the reform movement of the Sangha was kept alive by the devotees from the villages.

Ramakanta Muktiar had started another organization named Asom Sankar Mission at Karhali village in 1931 AD. This noble venture was assisted by Keshab Barua and Chandiram Bhuyan of Puranigudam, Kanak Ram Hazarika of Karhali village, and Haladhar Bhuyan etc. Muktiar stayed there till 1968 AD and kept working for the dissemination of the true ideology of Eka Sarana Nama Dharma founded by Srimanta Sankaradeva. The twentieth conference of the Sangha was held there in 1951 AD under the chairmanship of Pitambar Deva Goswami, the Satradhikar of Garmur Satra as Padadhikar.

Another stalwart of Sangha, Sonaram Chutiya came into the contact of Pitambar Deva Goswami in 1943 AD inside the Jorhat jail, whereupon a radical change came to the life of Chutiya. He came to Palasoni in 1946 AD and joined the Sangha. This marked a new era. Many other scholarly persons also joined the Sangha. A golden period started with the annual conference of the Sangha in 1951 AD. Subsequent conferences were invited to different places all over the state. The Silver Jubilee Session in 1956 AD at Kaliabor Kuwaritol in Nagaon district was presided over by eminent scholar, Dimbeswar Neog as Padadhikar. New thinking was started in the Sangha and emphasis was given to the opening of separate wings for the growth and nourishment of Sankari literature and Sankari culture. Proper guidelines were formulated for Sarana and Bhajana, the basic duties of the devotees. Bishnu Prasad Rabha inaugurated the cultural function of this Silver Jubilee Session.

A cultural wing of the Sangha was started in 1957 AD for the propagation of Sankari culture. This was followed by the formation of a literary wing in 1958 AD for spreading the gems of Sankari literature among the people. A magazine was started in 1933 AD. Its name, Nama-Dharma was given by Lakshminath Bezbarooah. Except for some temporary setback during the height of the freedom struggle, this journal has been regularly published since 1952 AD. This is one of the oldest journals being published in India. The literary wing has published many important books for the benefit of the devotees. A book detailing how to conduct a wedding by Nama-Prasanga is notable among them. This had been authored by Gopika Ballabh Goswami and Bhuban Chandra Bhuyan in 1937 AD. This was revised in 1977 AD. The constitution of the Srimanta Sankaradeva Sangha was given a final shape in 1971 AD from out of the preliminary guide-book prepared way back in 1933 AD. Till now 70 books have been published. Complete works of Srimanta Sankaradeva is the most important among them. His magnum opus, Kirtana Ghosha has been rendered to English and published already. It will now be rendered to Bengali also. Books by Sonaram Chutiya, Golap Mahanta, Yogeswar Bordoloi etc. are important treasures of Srimanta Sankaradeva Sangha. The Reception Committees also bring out many titles in every annual session. The Platinum Jubilee Session also will see the publication of several books, including one important book by Dr Sanjib Kumar Borkakoti, a leading academic of Assam, about the contributions of the Srimanta Sankaradeva to religion and culture. Every session publishes a voluminous multi-lingual souvenir with serious articles. These create an intellectual environment in the state. The intellectual growth in the state has certainly been stimulated by Srimanta Sankaradeva Sangha.

Srimanta Sankaradeva Sangha made it compulsory for the devotees to keep the holy Gunamala authored by Srimanta Sankaradeva on the altar. It removed the idolatry that had entered into the order in the intermittent period contrary to the teaching of the saint. It has been striving hard to bring about unity among the followers of Eka Sarana Nama Dharma. Srimanta Sankaradeva Sangha has spread its activities in the Barak valley and even outside Assam. Its Diamond Jubilee Session was held in 1992 AD at Hailakandi. The 550th birth anniversary of Srimanta Sankaradeva was celebrated in Kolkata, New Delhi, Puri, Kochbehar, etc. The 75th year of the Srimanta Sankaradeva Sangha has been celebrated in an appropriate manner in different places in the state. This celebration started with the 74th Dumardah session at Gauripur in 2005 AD.

The Srimanta Sankaradeva Sangha has also set up a youth wing called Sewa Bahini. This wing has worked for self-employment generation for the youths in different parts of the state through its volunteer force. They have set up self-help groups in different parts of the state and generated self-employment. In addition to economic activities, the regular emphasis on the building moral character and spirituality is there. Thus this youth wing has helped maintain peace and stability in the state as they preach non-violence and universal brotherhood. Srimanta Sankaradeva Sangha has set up 60 schools in the state to give spiritual education to the children in addition to general education. The education wing supervises these schools. The incorporation of the Sankaradeva study is an important feature of these schools. The students of these 60 schools are taught Sankari songs and dances, which were created by the saint. Thus these schools have become centres for cultural excellence, though no publicity is given in order to avoid the attraction of media, which may harm the studies of the students. Srimanta Sankaradeva Sangha has also set up separate schools for the training in dance and music. It has already created a team of danseuse and singers from these students who have been travelling in different parts of the country.

Headquarters of the Srimanta Sankaradeva Sangha was established in Kalongpar of Nagaon on July 27, 1969 AD after the government gave 2.5 bighas of land there. A cultural centre was established in Guwahati in 1985 AD in a plot of 5 bighas at Rupnagar. Thus the Government of Assam has been assisting the Srimanta Sankaradeva Sangha in its noble ventures. A big cultural complex has been erected at Dumardah near Gauripur in a plot of 47 bighas. Branch offices have been set up at Jorhat, Dibrugarh, Lakhimpur etc. Thus the Srimanta Sankaradeva Sangha is going ahead in full throttle with its avowed objectives of spreading the ideology of Srimanta Sankaradeva. Presently it is preparing plans for setting up a university, named, Mahapurusha Srimanta Sankaradeva Viswavidyalaya. This university will teach moral and ethical education, in addition, to present curricula so that future generations are imbued with good values.

== See also ==
- Mahapurusha Srimanta Sankaradeva Viswavidyalaya
