= Mahapurusha Srimanta Sankaradeva Viswavidyalaya =

Coordinates: 26.34923°N 92.68121°E

- Established: 2013; 13 years ago
- Affiliations: UGC
- Chancellor: Bhabendra Nath Deka
- Vice-Chancellor: Ashok Kumar Bora
- Visitor: Governor of Assam
- Location: Nagaon, Assam, India
- Campus: Suburban
- Website: mssv.ac.in

Mahapurusha Srimanta Sankaradeva Viswavidyalaya (MSSV) is a private university located in Nagaon, Assam, India. It was established through The Mahapurusha Srimanta Sankaradeva Viswavidyalaya Act, 2013 enacted by the Assam Legislative Assembly. The university is named after the Assamese saint-scholar and social reformer Srimanta Sankardev.

== History ==
The university was established on the initiative of the Srimanta Sankaradeva Sangha, one of the largest socio-cultural and religious organizations in Assam. The proposal for the institution was submitted under the provisions of the Assam Private Universities Act, 2007. The Assam Legislative Assembly passed The Mahapurusha Srimanta Sankaradeva Viswavidyalaya Act, 2013, paving the way for the creation of the university.

According to reports published by The Times of India, the university was conceived with the objective of promoting the teachings and philosophy of Srimanta Sankardev and Madhavdev while also offering professional and employment-oriented courses in various disciplines.

The university formally started functioning in 2014 from its campus at Kalongpar in Nagaon district. The permanent campus was developed on land provided by the Government of Assam near Batadrava, the birthplace of Srimanta Sankardev.

== Administration ==
The Visitor of the university is the Governor of Assam. The Chancellor is Bhabendra Nath Deka and the Vice-Chancellor is Ashok Kumar Bora.

== Campus ==
The main campus of the university is situated at Kalongpar in Nagaon district, Assam. MSSV also operates academic centres outside Nagaon and has expanded its activities through regional units in different parts of Assam.

== Academics ==
The university offers undergraduate, postgraduate, diploma and doctoral programmes in disciplines such as humanities, social sciences, law, education, computer applications, social work, performing arts, yogic science and Sankardeva studies.

== Recognition ==
Mahapurusha Srimanta Sankaradeva Viswavidyalaya is recognized by the University Grants Commission (UGC).

== Departments ==
The university comprises the following departments:

In Nagaon campus

- Department of Assamese
- Department of Economics
- Department of Education
- Department of English
- Department of Philosophy
- Department of Sociology
- Department of Sankaradeva Studies

In Guwahati campus

- Department of Computer Application
- Department of English
- Department of Juridical Studies
- Department of Performing Arts
- Department of Social Work
- Department of Yogic Science & Naturopathy
