= Kaliabor =

- town
- Location in Assam, India
- Coordinates: 26.32°N 92.53°E
- Country: India
- State: Assam
- District: Nagaon

Languages
  - Official: Assamese
- Time zone: UTC+5:30 (IST)
- PIN: 782137,782138
- ISO 3166 code: IN-AS
- Vehicle registration: AS-02
- Lok Sabha constituency: Kaliabor
- Vidhan Sabha constituency: Kaliabor

Kaliabor, a sub-division town in Nagaon district of Assam situated at a distance of 48 km east of Nagaon town. It was the headquarters of Borphukans during the Ahom era. Kaliabor lies in the middle of assam and surrounded in the north by the Brahmaputra, in the south by the hills of Karbi Anglong district, in the east by Kaziranga National Park under Golaghat district and in the west by New Gatanga & Samaguri under Nagaon Sadar Sub-Division.

Kaliabor – the rice bowl of Assam – Kaliabor occupies an important place in the annals of Assam history. The name "Kaliabor" owes its origin to the word "Tun-Rung-Dam", which means 'A Place of Black Big Trees' in the Tai language (Tun = Tree, Rung = Big, Dam = Black).

Kaliabor is famous for its several tourist spots both religious and natural. Distinct religious site includes Bharali Namghar, Silghat Kamakhya Mandir, Trishuldhari Shiva Mandir, Hatimura Durga Mandir, Gatanga Temple Located in New Gatanga.

== Education ==
=== School (This List doesn't Contains all the Institutes) ===
- Borghuli Jatiya Bidyalaya
- Pachim Kaliabor High School
- Khaloiati LP School
- Kuwaritol High School
- Kendriya Vidyalaya Missa Cantt.
- Borghuli High School (Prev. Borghuli High Madrassa)
- Don Bosco School, Missa
- Holy Faith English School
- Sandipani Vidyamandir
- Missa High school
- St. Roberts School
- Kuwaritol Girls High School
- Kaliabor Higher Secondary School
- Kaliabor Girls Higher Secondary School
- Shankar dev Shishu Niketon, Kaliabor
- Borbhagia High School
- Ambagan High School
- Sishu Bidyapith High School
- Bimala Academy
- Jakhalabandha H S School
- Nav Gurukul
- Hindustani Kendriya Vidyalaya

=== College ===
- New Gatanga Engineering College (Nagaon Engineering College)
- New Gatanga Food Craft Institute, Rangagorah
- Kaliabor College
- Kaliabor College of Education

== Politics ==
Kaliabor is part of Kaziranga Lok Sabha constituency.

== See also ==
- Kaziranga Lok Sabha constituency
