= Nagaon =

- City
- Nagaon
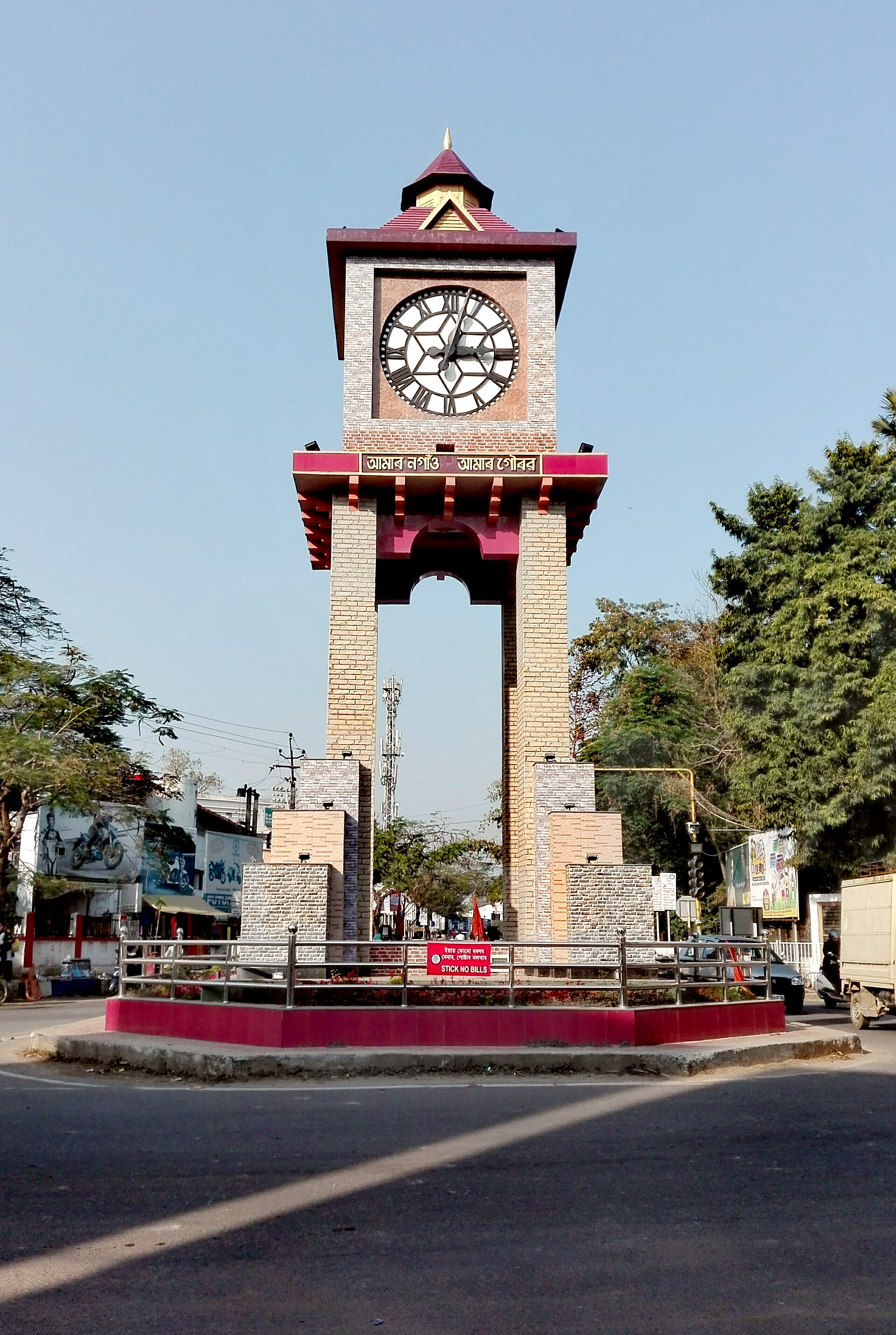
- Nagaon clock tower

- Location in Assam, india Nagaon (India)
- Coordinates: 26.3503828°N 92.6795912°E
- Country: India
- State: Assam
- Region: Central Assam
- District: Nagaon
- No. Of Wards: 28
- Established: 1832

Government
  - Type: Municipality
  - Body: Nagaon Municipal Board
  - MLA: Sri Rupak Sarmah, BJP
  - District Commissioner: Shri Aranyak Saikia, IAS
  - Superintendent Of Police: Shri Nabaneet Mahanta

Area
  - Total: 2,287 km^{2} (883 sq mi)
  - Rank: 5th in Assam

Population (2024(predicted))
  - Total: 209,000
  - Rank: 4th in Assam
  - Density: 828/km^{2} (2,140/sq mi)
- Demonym: Nagaoian/Nagaowese
- Time zone: UTC+5:30 (IST)
- PIN: 782001 to 782003
- Telephone code: 03672
- ISO 3166 code: IN-AS
- Vehicle registration: AS-02
- Sex Ratio: 981 ♀️/ 1000 ♂️
- Climate: Cwa
- Official Language: Assamese
- Literacy Rate: ▲87.34% high
- Lok Sabha Constituency: Nowgong
- Vidhan Sabha Constituency: Nagaon, Raha, Barhampur, Batadroba, Dhing, Rupohihut, Samaguri, Kaliabor
- Website: nagaon.assam.gov.in

Nagaon is a city and a municipal board in Nagaon district in the Indian state of Assam. It is situated 122.6 kilometres (76 mi) east of Guwahati. With a population of 116,355 as per 2011 census it is an AMRUT City and 4th biggest city of Assam.

== History ==
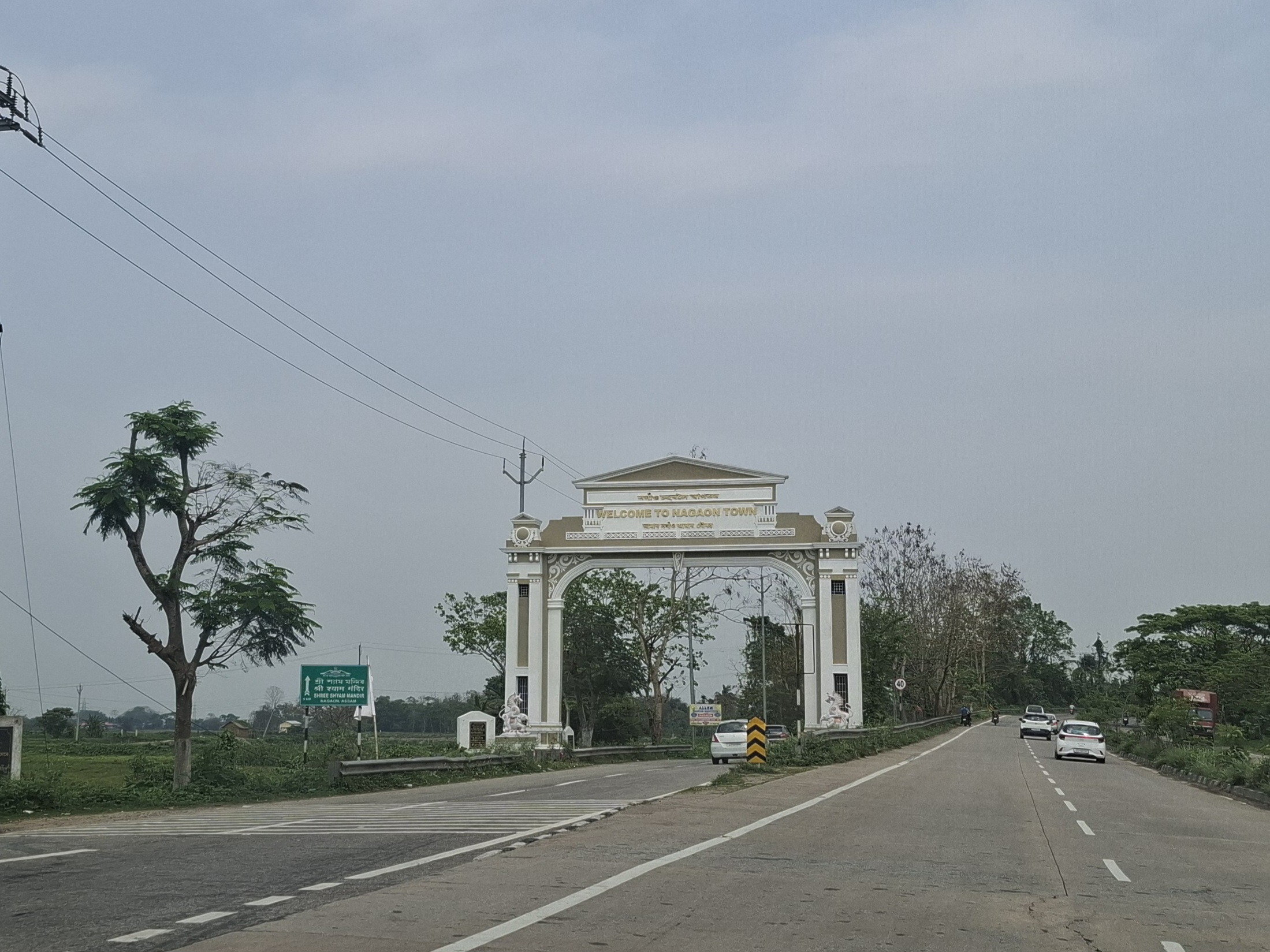
Nagaon Gate in Nagaon twon

This division was organised on both banks of the Kalang river by Momai Tamuli Borbarua in 1611 during the reign of Pratap Singha. Its settlement was completed during the reign of Gadadhar Singha. Nagaon was under the administration of the Borphukan. From Nagaon 1,310 soldiers took part in the Kachari invasion of Swargadeo Rudra Singha in 1707.

The area witnessed significant developments during the British colonial period. In 1833, Nagaon was established as a British administrative headquarters, becoming one of the original districts of Assam. The British administration brought several changes to the region, including the development of tea plantations and the introduction of modern education.

== Geography ==
The Kolong River, a tributary of the Brahmaputra River, flows through Nagaon and in the process divides the city into two distinct regions: Nagaon and Haibargaon.

Nagaon is bounded on the north by the Sonitpur district and the Brahmaputra River. On the south, it borders the West Karbi Anglong district, Dima Hasao and Hojai District. On the east it is bounded by the Karbi Anglong district and the Golaghat district, while on the west it neighbours the Marigaon district.

There are several beels, marshy areas and swamps in the district, including the regions of Marikalong, Potakalong, Haribhanga, Jongalbalahu, Samaguri Beel, Gatanga Beel Urigadang and Nawbhanga. These wetlands are former channels of the Kolong and Kopili rivers.

== Climate ==
Nagaon has been ranked 25th best “National Clean Air City” under (Category 3 population under 3 lakhs cities) in India.

== Transport ==
=== Road ===
There is very good availability of buses playing from Dibrugarh, Jorhat and Tezpur to Nagaon, There is flexibility of timings. Plenty of government and private buses travel between Guwahati and Nagaon. The district lies about 120 km east of Guwahati with an average travel time of 2 hours. Nagaon is about 190 km from Jorhat and 75 km from Tezpur. Taxies are available for hire from all major destinations to Nagaon.

=== Railway ===
There are two railway stations in Nagaon town, one at Haibargaon (Dhing gate) and another at Nagaon. The nearest railway junction is at Chaparmukh, which is around 28 km from Nagaon.

=== Airport ===
The nearest airport is Tezpur Airport. The nearest international airport is Lokpriya Gopinath Bordoloi International Airport in Guwahati.

== Demographics ==
Languages spoken in Nagaon city (2011)
1. Assamese (44.9%)
2. Bengali (21.8%)
3. Hindi (10.2%)
4. Others (23.1%)

As of 2011 India census, Nagaon city had a population of 155,889 making it one of the largest cities of Assam. The population is largely of heterogeneous nature. Indigenous Assamese communities along with tribal communities like Karbi, Tiwa (Lalung) are the natives of the city. Assamese is spoken by 70,039 people, Bengali is spoken by 33,978, Hindi is spoken by 15,926 people and 35,946 speaks others languages.

== Politics ==
Nagaon is part of the Lok Sabha constituency of Nowgong. Rupak Sarmah of BJP is the current MLA of Nowgong (Vidhan Sabha constituency).

Devasish Sharma of Bharatiya Janata Party is the current MP of Nowgong (Lok Sabha constituency).

== Education ==
Modern education was first introduced in the district by Christian missionaries, such as Miles Bronson and Nathan Brown in the nineteenth century. Anandaram Dhekial Phukan, a major figure in Assamese literature, spent the better part of his life in Nagaon, and the Assamese intellectual Gunabhiram Barua worked in Nagaon for about two decades.

=== Schools ===
The Nowgong Mission High School, established by Miles Bronson in 1846 is one of the oldest school in Assam. It also has the third oldest government school in Assam, the Nowgong Government Boys' Higher Secondary School, established in 1865. Another old school is the Dawson Higher Secondary & Multipurpose School.

Prominent English Medium Schools:

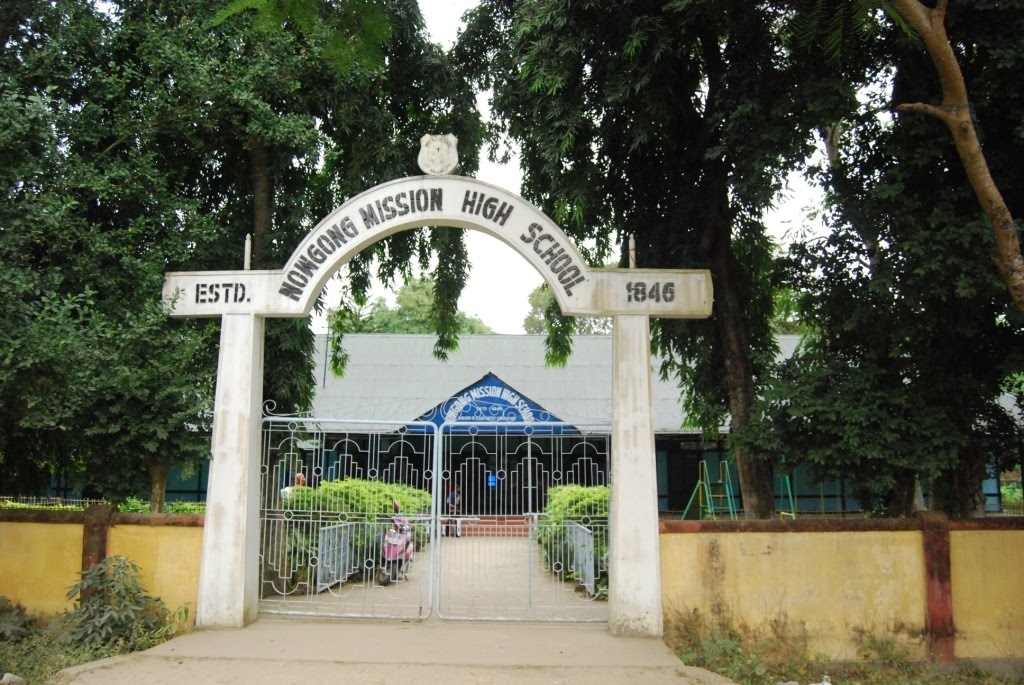
Front view of the main entrance of Nowgong Mission High School, the oldest school of Assam

- Kendriya Vidyalaya, Nagaon
- Christ Jyoti School
- Nowgong Mission High School
- St. Ignatius Loyola English Medium High School
- Delhi Public School, Nagaon
- Narayana e-Techno School
- St. Antony's High School
- Little Flower School, Nagaon
- Model English School
- Nagaon English Academy
- Sandipani Vidyamandir
- St. Boniface High School
- Riverdale School, Nagaon
- St. Justin School, Bebejia

School having both English and Assamese medium

- Ramanujan Secondary School

Other Schools of Repute:

- Shankardev Shishu Niketan, Nagaon
- National Academy Nagaon
- Nowgong Government Boys' Higher Secondary School
- Nowgong Government Girls' Higher Secondary School
- Nagaon Bengali Boys' Higher Secondary School
- Nagaon Bengali Girls' Higher Secondary School
- Government Urban Basic School
- Dawson Higher Secondary and Multipurpose School
- Om Prakash Jajodia Girls' Hindi High School
- Marwari Hindi high School
- Nabarup Jatiya Vidyapith
- Navaroop jatiya vidyapith
- Haibargaon Adarsha High School

=== Colleges ===
At present, there are about 25 colleges, of which probably the most renowned are

- A.D.P. College (named after Anandaram Dhekial Phookan)
- Nowgong College ( Nagaon University)
- Nowgong Girls' College
- Nowgong Law College
- College of Education, Nagaon
- Khagarijan College (named after the old administrative headquarters of Nowgong District)
- Nagaon G.N.D.G. Commerce College
- New Gatanga Food Craft Institute, Rangagorah
- Pioneer Arts College

Besides these there are a number of junior colleges that have sprung up in Nagaon. As such many students from the neighboring districts also come to study in these colleges. Some of these are

- Abhigyan Junior college
- Alpha Beta College]
- Anandaram Baruah Junior College
- Bharali's Academy Junior College
- Chanakya Junior College
- Concept Junior College
- CV Raman Junior College
- Daswani Classes (Domain Academy)
- Dimension Junior College
- Dr. S.R.K. Junior College
- Dronacharya Junior College
- Geetanjali Junior College
- Gurukul Global Academy, Nagaon
- Gyanpith Junior College
- Kalong-Kapili Vidyapith Junior College
- Kalongpar Vidyapith Junior College
- Kamala Kanta Barua Junior College
- Madhabdev Junior College
- Matrix Junior College
- Nagaon Junior College
- Nonoi Junior college
- Ramanujan Junior College
- Renaissance Junior College
- Srimanta Sankardev Junior College

=== Universities ===
1. Mahapurusha Srimanta Sankaradeva Viswavidyalaya

Nagaon is home to the Mahapurusha Srimanta Sankaradeva Viswavidyalaya, which offers postgraduate and doctorate level courses.

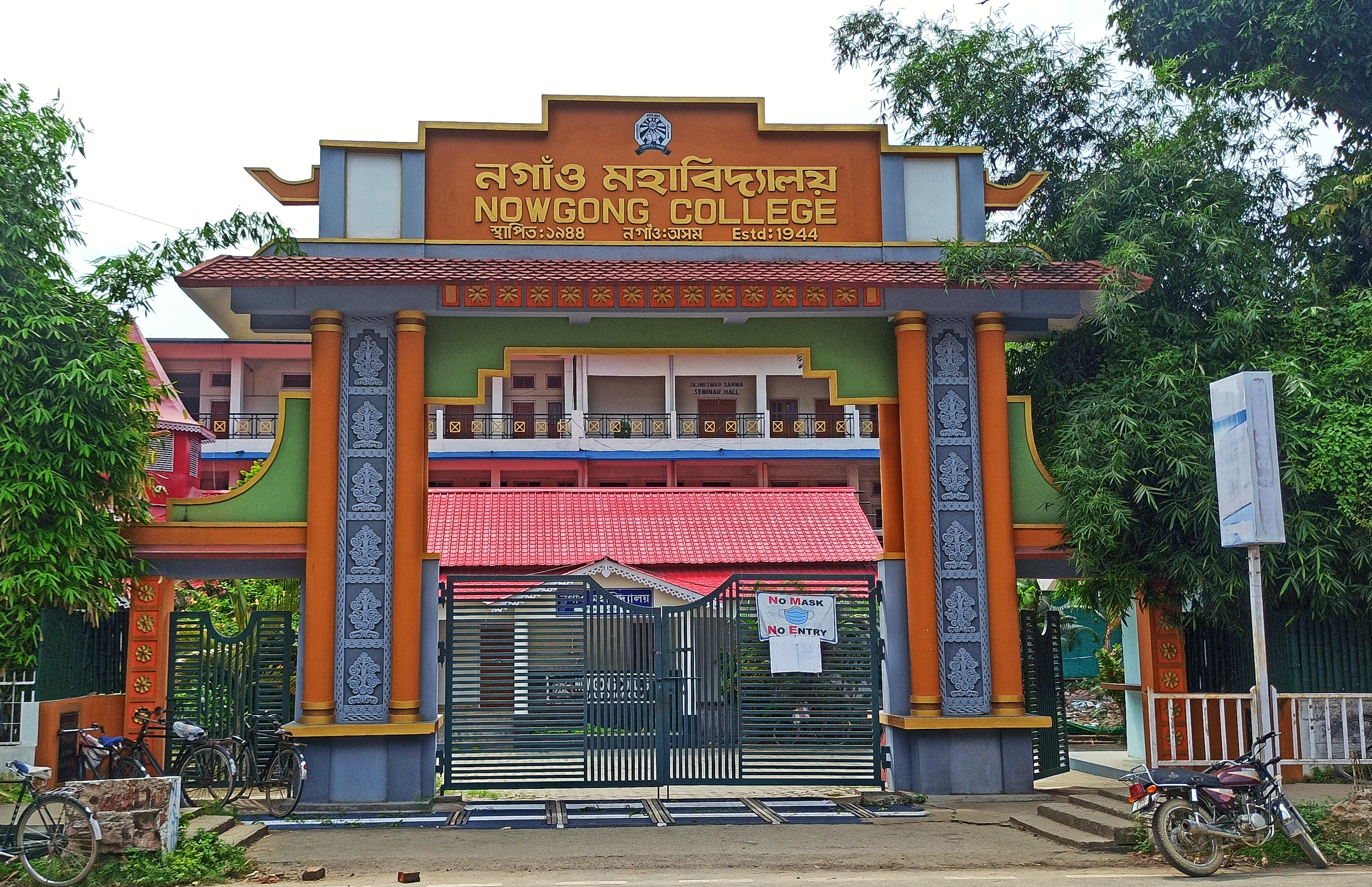
Nowgong College

2. Nagaon University

As of 2024, Nowgong College has been declared as a university. However, official status from the University Grants Commission of India (UGC) is pending.

=== Assam Homeopathic Medical College and Hospital ===
The Assam Homeopathic College is situated in Haibargaon, Nagaon. The institute was established in the year 1968. It is the first homeopathic medical college of the entire North East India.

=== Nowgong Polytechnic ===
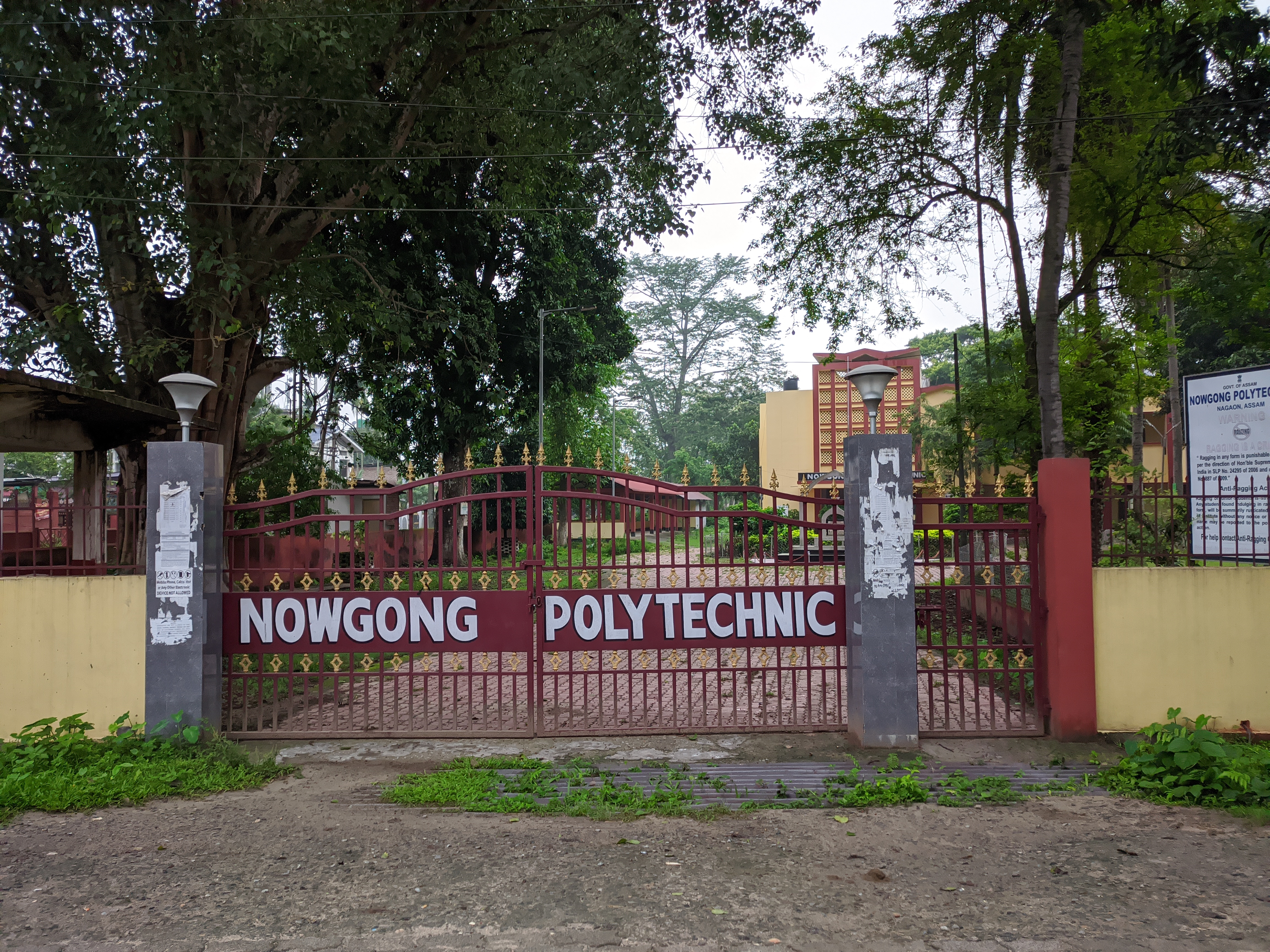
Nowgong Polytechnic

Nagaon is also home to Nowgong Polytechnic, one of the oldest technical education institutes in Assam.

Nagaon also has an ITI at Panigaon.

=== The College of Fisheries ===
The College of Fisheries, the only college of its kind in the entire northeastern India, is located in Raha and comes under the academic management of Assam Agricultural University in Jorhat.

=== Nagaon Medical College and Hospital ===
The foundation stone of the Nagaon Medical College and Hospital was laid by the then chief minister of Assam Mr. Tarun Gogoi in February 2016. It is located at Laokhowa Road, Mohkhuli Chariali, Diphalu, Nagaon - 782003.

Nagaon Medical College and Hospital commenced its inaugural academic session on September 1, 2023, with the induction of its first batch of 100 MBBS students. This event marked the beginning of the college's educational activities following its inauguration by Prime Minister Narendra Modi on April 14, 2023. The college is affiliated with Srimanta Sankaradeva University of Health Sciences and operates under the approval of the National Medical Commission.

=== Nagaon Engineering College ===
The Nagaon Engineering College is currently under construction at Engineer's Street, Food Craft Road, Rangagarah Circle, New Gatanga near Nonoi Tea Estate. Situated approximately 25 kilometers from Nagaon city, the college spans an area of 35 bighas (11.56 acres). It is expected to be operational in a couple of years.

== Notable people ==
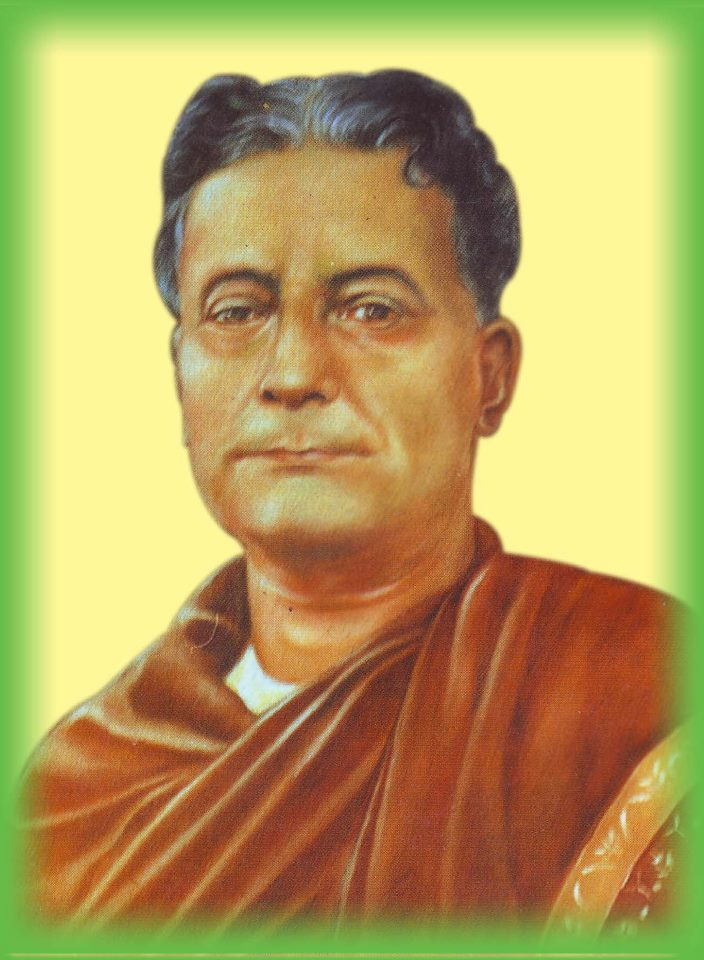
Lakshminath Bezbaruah

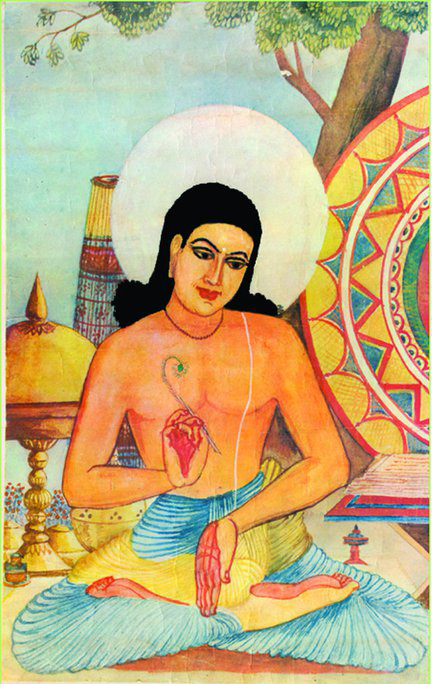
Srimanta Sankardev

- Lakshminath Bezbarua, poet, novelist and writer
- Jatin Bora, actor
- Kiran Bala Bora, freedom fighter
- Lakshmi Nandan Bora, novelist
- Mahim Bora, writer
- Mayur Bora, writer
- Gopinath Bordoloi, First Chief Minister of Assam
- Asha Bordoloi, actress
- Hima Das, athlete
- Birendra Nath Datta, academician, linguist, author
- Pabitra Kumar Deka, journalist and humour writer
- Rashami Desai, actress
- Diganta Hazarika, actor
- Khagen Mahanta, singer
- Prafulla Kumar Mahanta, politician, Former Chief Minister of Assam
- Papon, singer, musician
- Bhabendra Nath Saikia, award winning film director and physicist
- Sankardev, saint
- Parween Sultana, classical singer.

== Sports ==
The multipurpose Nurul Amin Stadium of Nagaon is named after the late sportsperson Nurul Amin. It hosts the famous All India Independence Day Cup football tournament every year wherein most of the teams of national repute participate. Other sports like cricket, hockey, kabaddi etc. are also played in this stadium, and sports training programs are also held here.

Hima Das, who is an Indian sprinter and the first Indian athlete to win a gold medal in a track event at the IAAF World U20 Championships, was born in Dhing, a town in Nagaon.

== Photo gallery ==
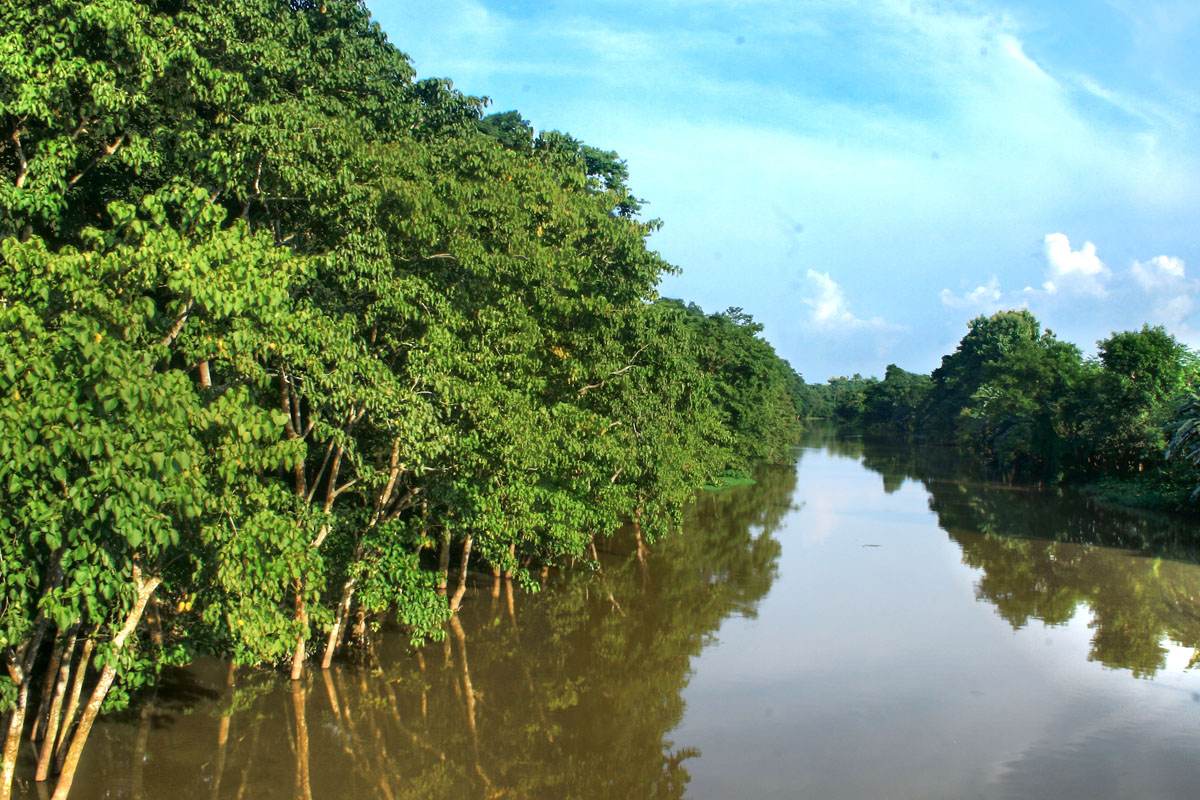
The Kolong river flowing through Nagaon

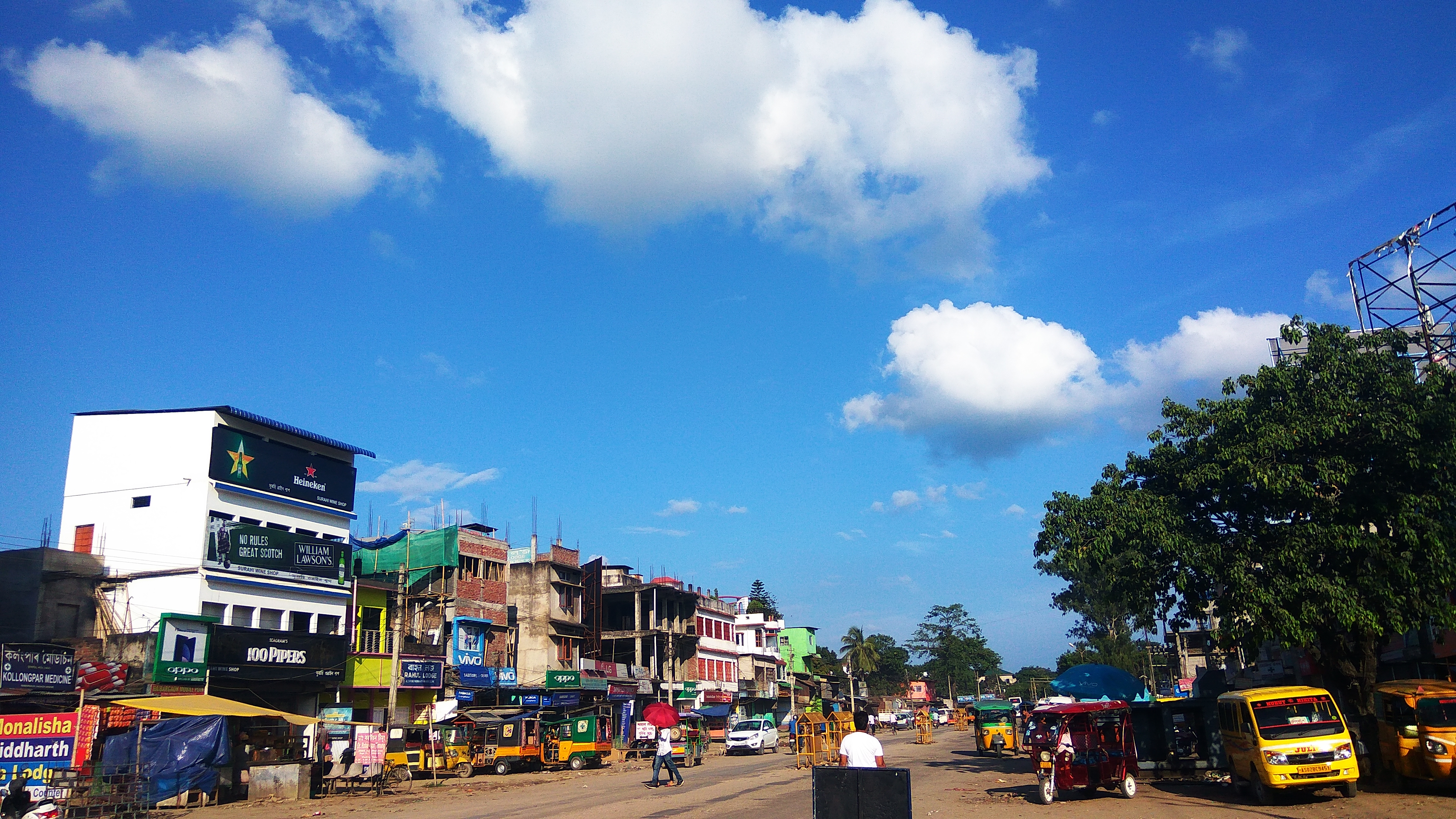
An area of Nagaon Town

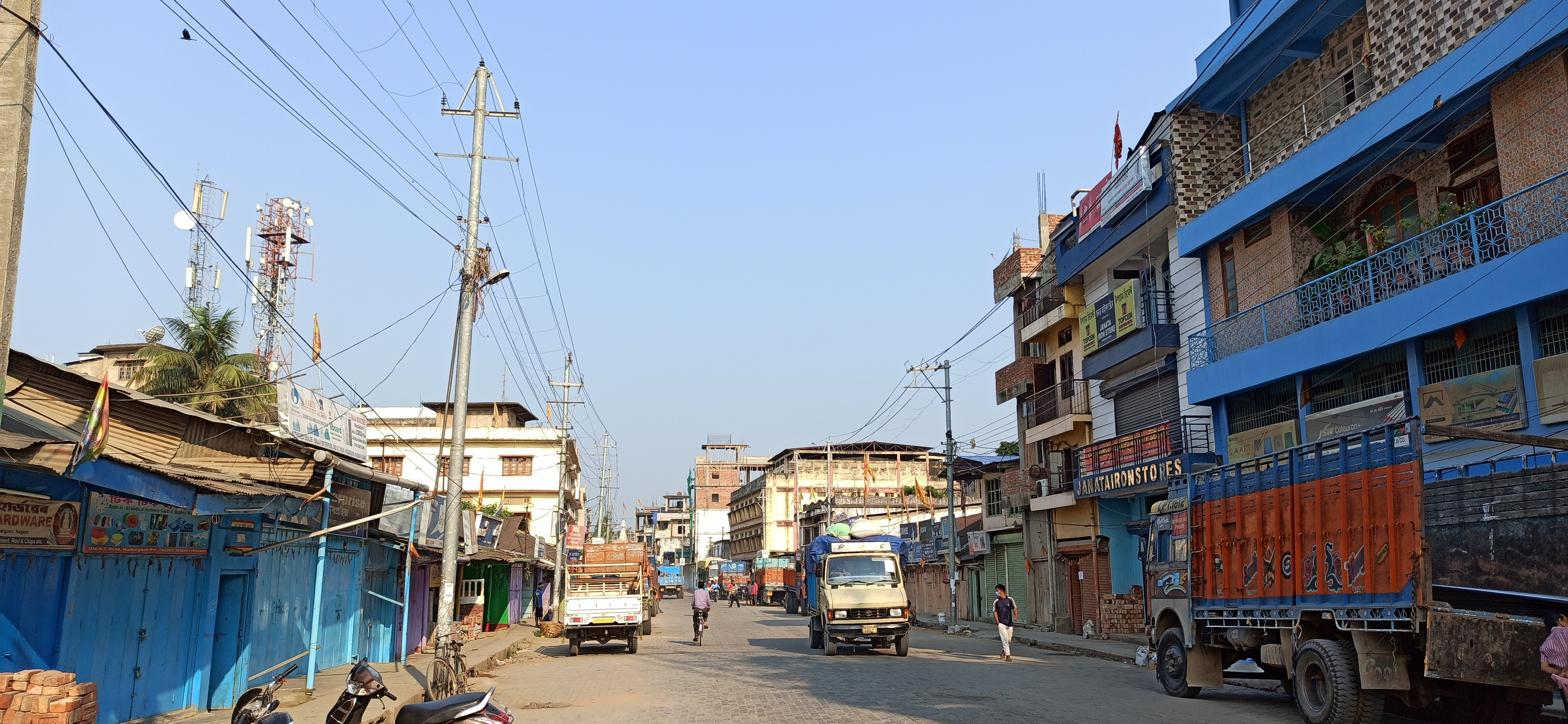
Haibargaon, a commercial area of Nagaon

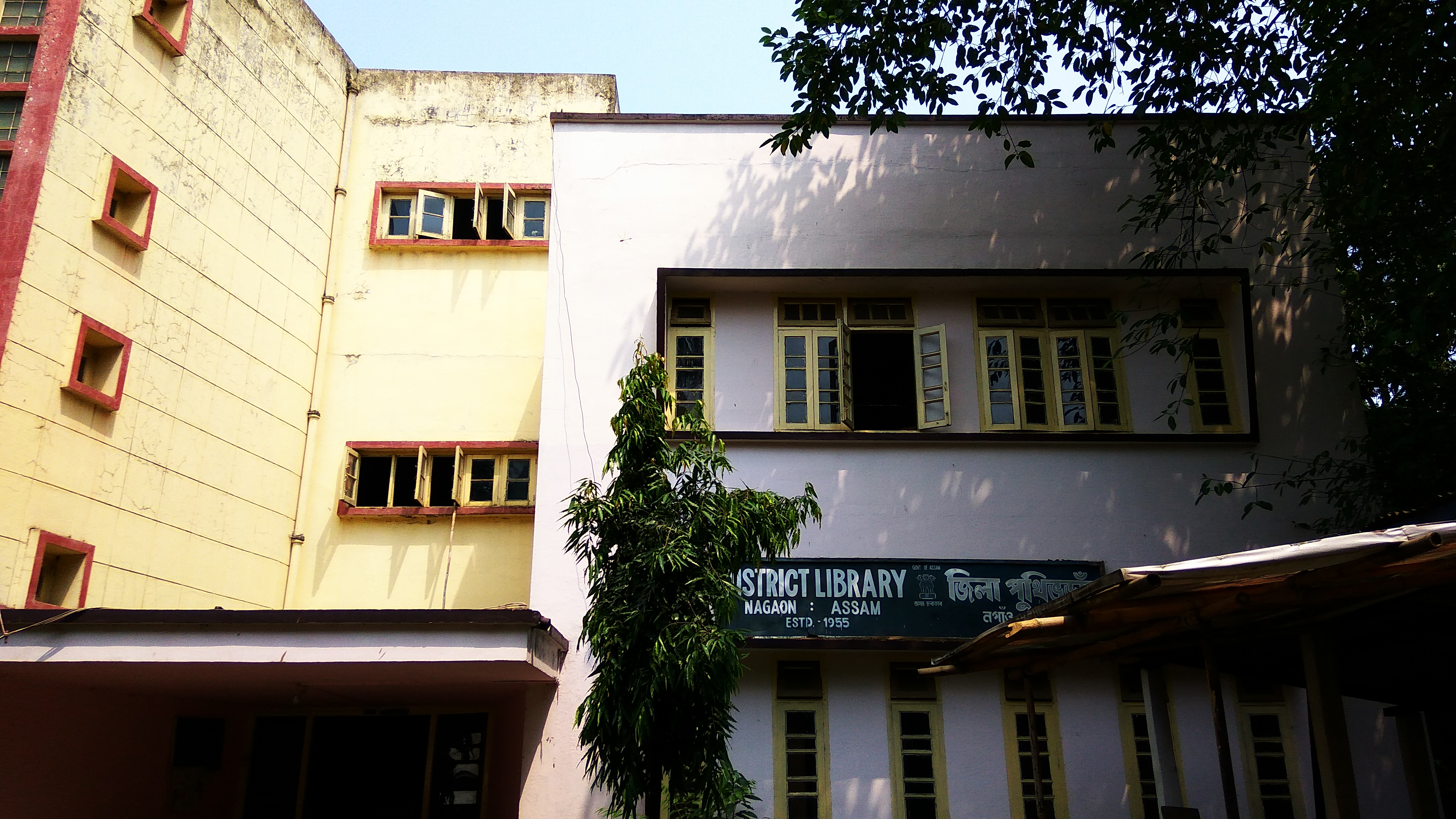
Nagaon District Library

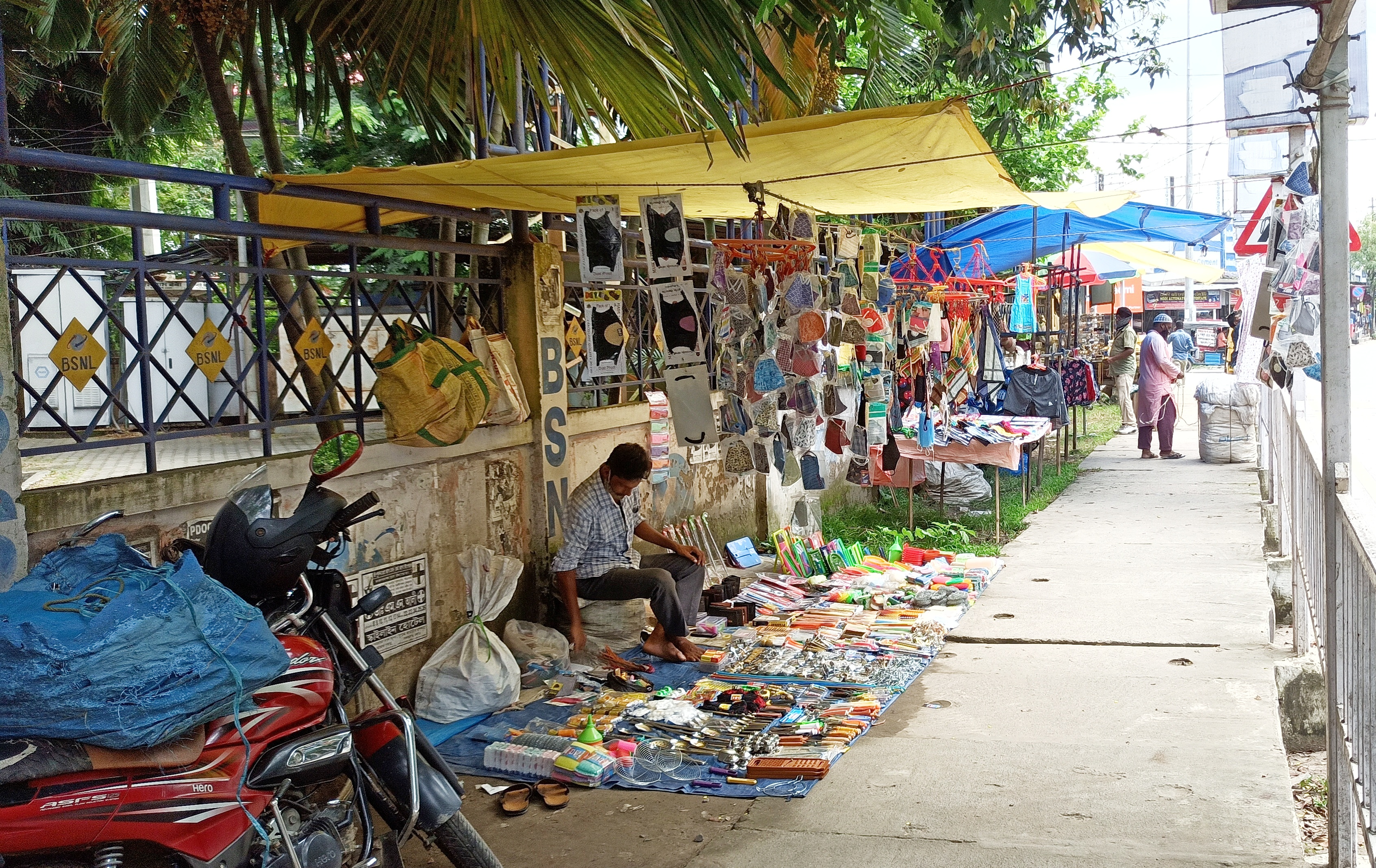
A temporary jewellery shop on a footpath of Nagaon

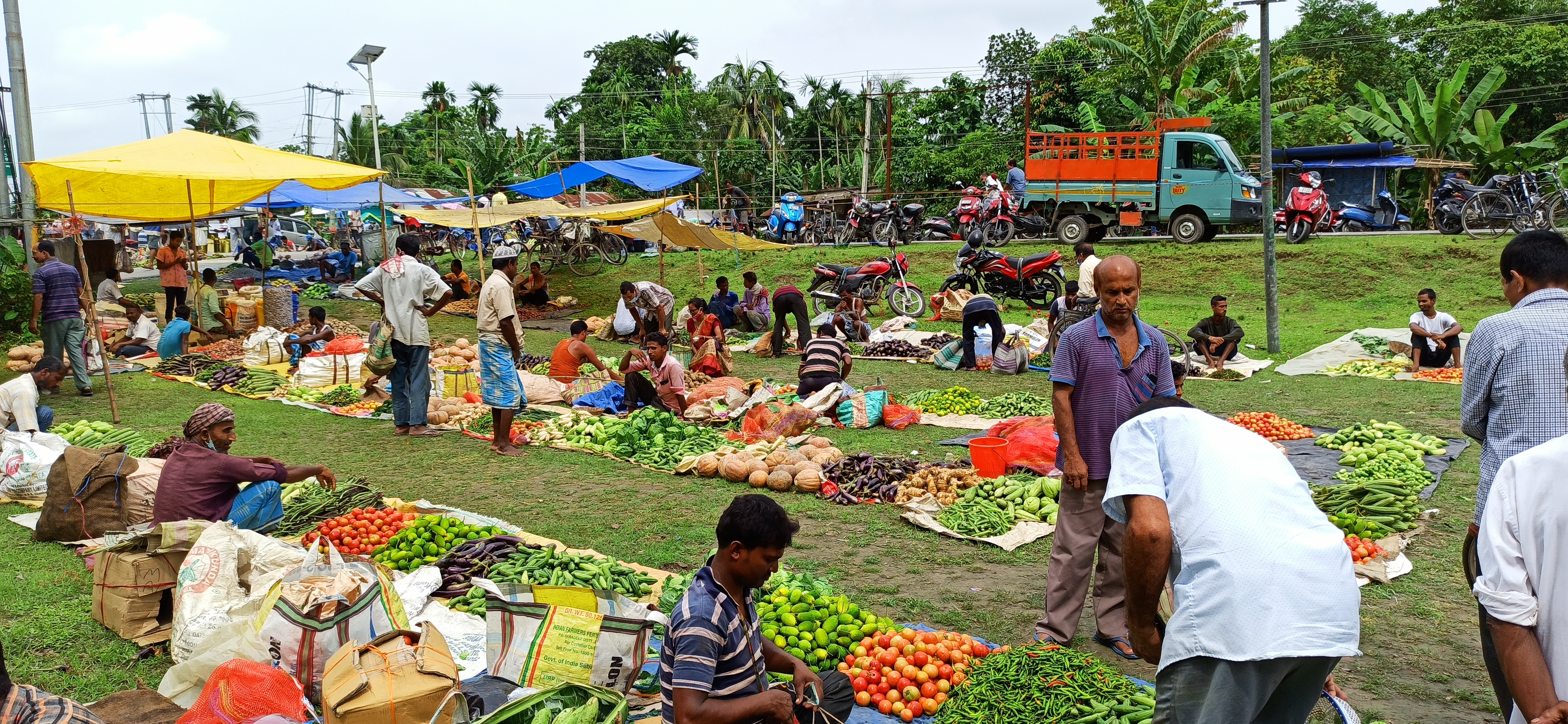
A typical weekly market in a village of Nagaon District

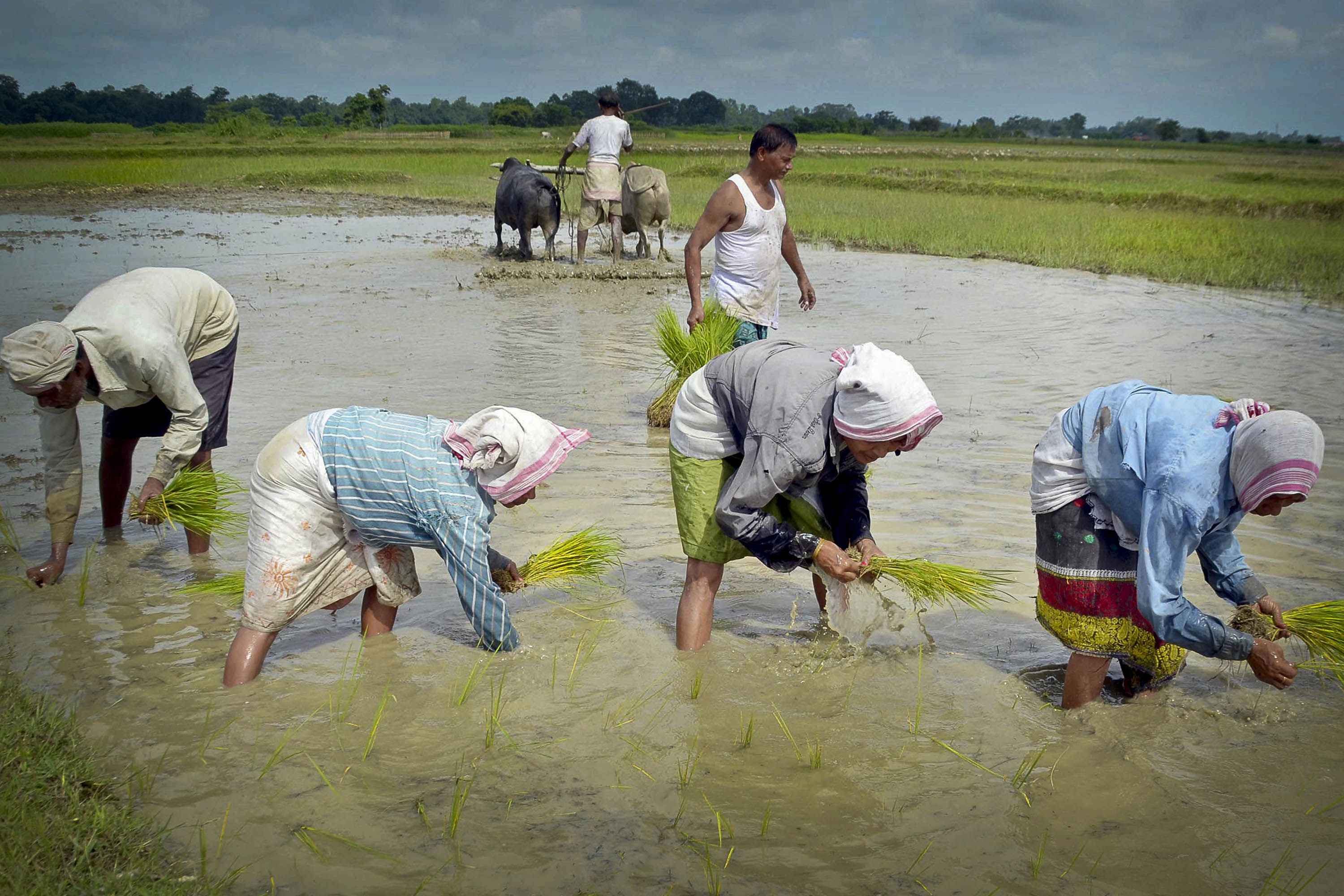
Local people busy in paddy field of Nagaon

== See also ==
- New Gatanga
- Samaguri
- Dabaka
- Hojai
- Kaliabor
