= 16th Assam Assembly =

Indian state legislature since 2021

←	15th Assembly

Overview
- Legislative body: Assam Legislative Assembly
- Term: 21 May 2026 –
- Election: 2026
- Government: Sarma II
- Opposition: Indian National Congress
- Members: 126
- Speaker: Ranjeet Kumar Dass
- Deputy Speaker: Habbey Teron
- Leader of the House: Himanta Biswa Sarma
- Leader of the Opposition: TBA
- Party control: National Democratic Alliance

The 16th Legislative Assembly of Assam succeeds the 15th Assembly of Assam and will be constituted sooner following the National Democratic Alliance's victory in the 2026 assembly election that was held on 9 April 2026.

== Office bearers ==
S.No	Position	Portrait	Name	Party	Constituency	Office Taken	Reference
1	Speaker		Ranjeet Kumar Dass	BJP	Bhowanipur–Sorbhog	21 May 2026	
2	Deputy Speaker		Habbey Teron	BJP	Amri (ST)	21 June 2026	
3	Leader of the House (Chief Minister)		Himanta Biswa Sarma	BJP	Jalukbari	12 May 2026	
4	Leader of the Opposition		Wazed Ali Choudhury	INC			
5	Deputy Leader of the Opposition		Joy Prakash Das	INC			

== Members of the Legislative Assembly ==
District	No.	Constituency	Name	Party	Alliance	Remarks
Kokrajhar	1	Gossaigaon	Sabharam Basumatary	BPF	NDA	
Kokrajhar	2	Dotma (ST)	Rabiram Narzary	BPF	NDA	
Kokrajhar	3	Kokrajhar (ST)	Sewli Mohilary	BPF	NDA	
Kokrajhar	4	Baokhungri	Rupam Chandra Roy	BPF	NDA	
Kokrajhar	5	Parbatjhora	Md Ashraful Islam Sheikh	INC	ASM	
Dhubri	6	Golakganj	Ashwini Roy Sarkar	BJP	NDA	
Dhubri	7	Gauripur	Abdus Sobahan Ali Sarkar	INC	ASM	
Dhubri	8	Dhubri	Baby Begum	INC	ASM	
Dhubri	9	Birsing Jarua	Wazed Ali Choudhury	INC	ASM	
Dhubri	10	Bilasipara	Jibesh Rai	AGP	NDA	
South Salmara-Mankachar	11	Mankachar	Mohibur Rohman	INC	ASM	
Goalpara	12	Jaleshwar	Aftab Uddin Mollah	INC	ASM	
Goalpara	13	Goalpara West (ST)	Pabitra Rabha	BJP	NDA	
Goalpara	14	Goalpara East	Abul Kalam Rasheed Alam	INC	ASM	
Goalpara	15	Dudhnai (ST)	Tankeswar Rabha	BJP	NDA	
Bongaigaon	16	Abhayapuri	Bhupen Roy	BJP	NDA	
Bongaigaon	17	Srijangram	Md. Nurul Islam	INC	ASM	
Bongaigaon	18	Bongaigaon	Diptimayee Choudhury	AGP	NDA	
Chirang	19	Sidli–Chirang (ST)	Paniram Brahma	BPF	NDA	
Chirang	20	Bijni	Arup Kumar Dey	BJP	NDA	
Bajali	21	Bhowanipur–Sorbhog	Ranjeet Kumar Dass	BJP	NDA	
Barpeta	22	Mandia	Sherman Ali Ahmed	MAITC	None	
Barpeta	23	Chenga	Abdur Rahim Ahmed	INC	ASM	
Barpeta	24	Barpeta (SC)	Dipak Kumar Das	AGP	NDA	
Barpeta	25	Pakabetbari	Jakir Hussain Sikdar	INC	ASM	
Bajali	26	Bajali	Dharmeswar Roy	AGP	NDA	
Kamrup	27	Chamaria	Rekibuddin Ahmed	INC	ASM	
Kamrup	28	Boko–Chaygaon (ST)	Raju Mesh	BJP	NDA	
Kamrup	29	Palasbari	Himangshu Shekhar Baishya	BJP	NDA	
Kamrup	30	Hajo–Sualkuchi (SC)	Prakash Chandra Das	AGP	NDA	
Kamrup	31	Rangiya	Bhabesh Kalita	BJP	NDA	
Kamrup	32	Kamalpur	Diganta Kalita	BJP	NDA	
Kamrup Metropolitan	33	Dispur	Pradyut Bordoloi	BJP	NDA	
Kamrup Metropolitan	34	Dimoria (SC)	Tapan Das	AGP	NDA	
Kamrup Metropolitan	35	New Guwahati	Diplu Ranjan Sarmah	BJP	NDA	
Kamrup Metropolitan	36	Guwahati Central	Vijay Kumar Gupta	BJP	NDA	
Kamrup Metropolitan	37	Jalukbari	Himanta Biswa Sarma	BJP	NDA	Chief minister
Nalbari	38	Barkhetri	Narayan Deka	BJP	NDA	
Nalbari	39	Nalbari	Jayanta Malla Baruah	BJP	NDA	
Nalbari	40	Tihu	Chandra Mohan Patowary	BJP	NDA	
Baksa	41	Manas	Thaneswar Basumatary	BPF	NDA	
Baksa	42	Baksa (ST)	Maneswar Brahma	BPF	NDA	
Tamulpur	43	Tamulpur (ST)	Biswajit Daimary	BJP	NDA	
Tamulpur	44	Goreshwar	Victor Kumar Das	BJP	NDA	
Udalguri	45	Bhergaon	Maheswar Baro	BPF	NDA	
Udalguri	46	Udalguri (ST)	Rihon Daimary	BPF	NDA	
Udalguri	47	Majbat	Charan Boro	BPF	NDA	
Udalguri	48	Tangla	Bikan Chandra Deka	BJP	NDA	
Darrang	49	Sipajhar	Paramananda Rajbongshi	BJP	NDA	
Darrang	50	Mangaldai	Nilima Devi	BJP	NDA	
Darrang	51	Dalgaon	Mazibur Rahman	AIUDF	None	
Morigaon	52	Jagiroad (SC)	Pijush Hazarika	BJP	NDA	
Morigaon	53	Laharighat	Asif Mohammad Nazar	INC	ASM	
Morigaon	54	Morigaon	Rama Kantha Dewri	BJP	NDA	
Nagaon	55	Dhing	Mehboob Mukhtar	RD	None	
Nagaon	56	Rupohihat	Nurul Huda	INC	ASM	
Nagaon	57	Kaliabor	Keshab Mahanta	AGP	NDA	
Nagaon	58	Samaguri	Tanzil Hussain	INC	ASM	
Nagaon	59	Barhampur	Jitu Goswami	BJP	NDA	
Nagaon	60	Nagaon–Batadraba	Rupak Sarmah	BJP	NDA	
Nagaon	61	Raha (SC)	Sashi Kanta Das	BJP	NDA	
Hojai	62	Binnakandi	Mohammed Badruddin Ajmal	AIUDF	None	
Hojai	63	Hojai	Shiladitya Dev	BJP	NDA	
Hojai	64	Lumding	Sibu Misra	BJP	NDA	
Sonitpur	65	Dhekiajuli	Ashok Singhal	BJP	NDA	
Sonitpur	66	Barchalla	Ritu Baran Sarmah	BJP	NDA	
Sonitpur	67	Tezpur	Prithiraj Rava	AGP	NDA	
Sonitpur	68	Rangapara	Krishna Kamal Tanti	BJP	NDA	
Sonitpur	69	Nadaur	Padma Hazarika	BJP	NDA	
Biswanath	70	Biswanath	Pallab Lochan Das	BJP	NDA	
Biswanath	71	Behali (SC)	Munindra Das	BJP	NDA	
Biswanath	72	Gohpur	Utpal Borah	BJP	NDA	
Lakhimpur	73	Bihpuria	Bhupen Kumar Borah	BJP	NDA	
Lakhimpur	74	Rongonadi	Rishiraj Hazarika	BJP	NDA	
Lakhimpur	75	Naoboicha (SC)	Joy Prakash Das	INC	ASM	
Lakhimpur	76	Lakhimpur	Manab Deka	BJP	NDA	
Lakhimpur	77	Dhakuakhana (ST)	Naba Kumar Doley	BJP	NDA	
Dhemaji	78	Dhemaji (ST)	Ranoj Pegu	BJP	NDA	
Dhemaji	79	Sissiborgaon	Jiban Gogoi	BJP	NDA	
Dhemaji	80	Jonai (ST)	Bhubon Pegu	BJP	NDA	
Tinsukia	81	Sadiya	Bolin Chetia	BJP	NDA	
Tinsukia	82	Doom Dooma	Rupesh Gowala	BJP	NDA	
Tinsukia	83	Margherita	Bhaskar Sharma	BJP	NDA	
Tinsukia	84	Digboi	Suren Phukan	BJP	NDA	
Tinsukia	85	Makum	Sanjoy Kishan	BJP	NDA	
Tinsukia	86	Tinsukia	Pulok Gohain	BJP	NDA	
Dibrugarh	87	Chabua–Lahowal	Binod Hazarika	BJP	NDA	
Dibrugarh	88	Dibrugarh	Prasanta Phukan	BJP	NDA	
Dibrugarh	89	Khowang	Chakradhar Gogoi	BJP	NDA	
Dibrugarh	90	Duliajan	Rameswar Teli	BJP	NDA	
Dibrugarh	91	Tingkhong	Bimal Borah	BJP	NDA	
Dibrugarh	92	Naharkatia	Taranga Gogoi	BJP	NDA	
Charaideo	93	Sonari	Dhormeswar Konwar	BJP	NDA	
Charaideo	94	Mahmora	Suruj Dehingia	BJP	NDA	
Sibsagar	95	Demow	Susanta Borgohain	BJP	NDA	
Sibsagar	96	Sibsagar	Akhil Gogoi	RD	None	
Sibsagar	97	Nazira	Mayur Borgohain	BJP	NDA	
Majuli	98	Majuli (ST)	Bhuban Gam	BJP	NDA	
Jorhat	99	Teok	Bikash Saikia	AGP	NDA	
Jorhat	100	Jorhat	Hitendra Nath Goswami	BJP	NDA	
Jorhat	101	Mariani	Rupjyoti Kurmi	BJP	NDA	
Jorhat	102	Titabor	Dhiraj Gowala	BJP	NDA	
Golaghat	103	Golaghat	Ajanta Neog	BJP	NDA	
Golaghat	104	Dergaon	Mridul Kumar Dutta	BJP	NDA	
Golaghat	105	Bokakhat	Atul Bora	AGP	NDA	
Golaghat	106	Khumtai	Mrinal Saikia	BJP	NDA	
Golaghat	107	Sarupathar	Biswajit Phukan	BJP	NDA	
Karbi Anglong	108	Bokajan (ST)	Surjya Rongphar	BJP	NDA	
Karbi Anglong	109	Howraghat (ST)	Lunsing Teron	BJP	NDA	
Karbi Anglong	110	Diphu (ST)	Niso Terangpi	BJP	NDA	
West Karbi Anglong	111	Rongkhang (ST)	Tuliram Ronghang	BJP	NDA	
West Karbi Anglong	112	Amri (ST)	Habbey Teron	BJP	NDA	
Dima Hasao	113	Haflong (ST)	Rupali Langthasa	BJP	NDA	
Cachar	114	Lakhipur	Kaushik Rai	BJP	NDA	
Cachar	115	Udharbond	Rajdeep Goala	BJP	NDA	
Cachar	116	Katigorah	Kamalakhya Dey Purkayastha	BJP	NDA	
Cachar	117	Borkhola	Kishor Nath	BJP	NDA	
Cachar	118	Silchar	Dr. Rajdeep Roy	BJP	NDA	
Cachar	119	Sonai	Aminul Haque Laskar	INC	ASM	
Cachar	120	Dholai (SC)	Amiya Kanti Das	BJP	NDA	
Hailakandi	121	Hailakandi	Dr. Milon Das	BJP	NDA	
Hailakandi	122	Algapur–Katlicherra	Zubair Anam Mazumder	INC	ASM	
Sribhumi	123	Karimganj North	Jakaria Ahmed	INC	ASM	
Sribhumi	124	Karimganj South	Aminur Rashid Choudhury	INC	ASM	
Sribhumi	125	Patharkandi	Krishnendu Paul	BJP	NDA	
Sribhumi	126	Ram Krishna Nagar (SC)	Bijoy Malakar	BJP	NDA	
