= 14th Assam Assembly =

Indian state legislature (2016–2021)

←	13th Assembly	15th Assembly	→

Overview
- Legislative body: Assam Legislative Assembly
- Term: 2016 – 2021
- Election: 2016 Assam Legislative Assembly election
- Government: Sonowal ministry
- Opposition: Indian National Congress
- Members: 126
- Speaker: Ranjeet Kumar Dass (2016–17); Hitendra Nath Goswami (2017–21)
- Leader of the House: Sarbananda Sonowal
- Leader of the Opposition: Debabrata Saikia
- Party control: National Democratic Alliance

The 14th Legislative Assembly of Assam constituted after the 2016 Assam Legislative Assembly elections which were concluded in April 2016, with the results being declared on 19 May 2016.

== Members of Legislative Assembly ==
No.	Constituency	MLA	Party
1	Ratabari (SC)	Bijoy Malakar	Bharatiya Janata Party
2	Patharkandi	Krishnendu Paul	Bharatiya Janata Party
3	Karimganj North	Kamalakhya Dey Purkayastha	Indian National Congress
4	Karimganj South	Aziz Ahmed Khan	All India United Democratic Front
5	Badarpur	Jamal Uddin Ahmed	Indian National Congress
6	Hailakandi	Anwar Hussain Laskar	All India United Democratic Front
7	Katlicherra	Suzam Uddin Laskar	All India United Democratic Front
8	Algapur	Nizam Uddin Choudhury	All India United Democratic Front
9	Silchar	Dilip Kumar Paul	Bharatiya Janata Party
10	Sonai	Aminul Haque Laskar	Bharatiya Janata Party
11	Dholai (SC)	Parimal Suklabaidya	Bharatiya Janata Party
12	Udharbond	Mihir Kanti Shome	Bharatiya Janata Party
13	Lakhipur	Rajdeep Goala	Indian National Congress (later joined BJP)
14	Barkhola	Kishor Nath	Bharatiya Janata Party
15	Katigorah	Amar Chand Jain	Bharatiya Janata Party
16	Haflong (ST)	Bir Bhadra Hagjer	Bharatiya Janata Party
17	Bokajan (ST)	Numal Momin	Bharatiya Janata Party
18	Howraghat (ST)	Joyram Engleng	Bharatiya Janata Party
19	Diphu (ST)	Sum Ronghang	Bharatiya Janata Party
20	Baithalangso (ST)	Mansing Rongpi	Bharatiya Janata Party
21	Mankachar	Dr. Motiur Rohman Mondal	Indian National Congress
22	Salmara South	Wazed Ali Chowdhury	Indian National Congress
23	Dhubri	Najrul Hoque	All India United Democratic Front
24	Gauripur	Nijanur Rahman	All India United Democratic Front
25	Golakganj	Ashwini Roy Sarkar	Bharatiya Janata Party
26	Bilasipara West	Hafiz Bashir Ahmed	All India United Democratic Front
27	Bilasipara East	Ashok Kumar Singhi	Bharatiya Janata Party
28	Gossaigaon	Majendra Narzary	Bodoland People's Front
29	Kokrajhar West (ST)	Rabiram Narzary	Bodoland People's Front
30	Kokrajhar East (ST)	Pramila Rani Brahma	Bodoland People's Front
31	Sidli (ST)	Chandan Brahma	Bodoland People's Front
32	Bongaigaon	Phani Bhusan Choudhury	Asom Gana Parishad
33	Bijni	Kamal Singh Narzary	Bodoland People's Front
34	Abhayapuri North	Abdul Hai Nagori	Indian National Congress
35	Abhayapuri South (SC)	Ananta Kumar Malo	All India United Democratic Front
36	Dudhnai (ST)	Dipak Rabha	Bharatiya Janata Party
37	Goalpara East	Abul Kalam Rasheed Alam	Indian National Congress
38	Goalpara West	Abdur Rasheed Mandal	Indian National Congress
39	Jaleswar	Sahab Uddin Ahmed	All India United Democratic Front
40	Sorbhog	Ranjit Kumar Das	Bharatiya Janata Party
41	Bhabanipur	Abul Kalam Azad	All India United Democratic Front
42	Patacharkuchi	Pabindra Deka	Asom Gana Parishad
43	Barpeta	Gunindra Nath Das	Asom Gana Parishad
44	Jania	Rafiqul Islam	All India United Democratic Front
45	Baghbor	Sherman Ali Ahmed	Indian National Congress
46	Sarukhetri	Jakir Hussain Sikdar	Indian National Congress
47	Chenga	Sukur Ali Ahmed	Indian National Congress
48	Boko (SC)	Nandita Das	Indian National Congress
49	Chaygaon	Rekibuddin Ahmed	Indian National Congress
50	Palasbari	Pranab Kalita	Bharatiya Janata Party
51	Jalukbari	Himanta Biswa Sarma	Bharatiya Janata Party
52	Dispur	Atul Bora	Bharatiya Janata Party
53	Gauhati East	Siddhartha Bhattacharya	Bharatiya Janata Party
54	Gauhati West	Ramendra Narayan Kalita	Asom Gana Parishad
55	Hajo	Suman Haripriya	Bharatiya Janata Party
56	Kamalpur	Satyabrat Kalita	Asom Gana Parishad
57	Rangia	Bhabesh Kalita	Bharatiya Janata Party
58	Tamulpur	Emmanuel Mosahary	Bodoland People's Front
59	Nalbari	Ashok Sarma	Bharatiya Janata Party
60	Barkhetry	Narayan Deka	Bharatiya Janata Party
61	Dharmapur	Chandra Mohan Patowary	Bharatiya Janata Party
62	Barama (ST)	Maneswar Brahma	Bodoland People's Front
63	Chapaguri (ST)	Thaneswar Basumatary	Bodoland People's Front
64	Panery	Kamali Basumatari	Bodoland People's Front
65	Kalaigaon	Maheswar Baro	Bodoland People's Front
66	Sipajhar	Binanda Kumar Saikia	Bharatiya Janata Party
67	Mangaldoi (SC)	Gurujyoti Das	Bharatiya Janata Party
68	Dalgaon	Ilias Ali	Indian National Congress
69	Udalguri (ST)	Rihon Daimary	Bodoland People's Front
70	Majbat	Charan Boro	Bodoland People's Front
71	Dhekiajuli	Ashok Singhal	Bharatiya Janata Party
72	Barchalla	Ganesh Kumar Limbu	Bharatiya Janata Party
73	Tezpur	Brindaban Goswami	Asom Gana Parishad
74	Rangapara	Pallab Lochan Das (2016–19)	Bharatiya Janata Party
74	Rangapara	Rajen Borthakur (2019–21)	Bharatiya Janata Party
75	Sootea	Padma Hazarika	Bharatiya Janata Party
76	Biswanath	Promod Borthakur	Bharatiya Janata Party
77	Behali	Ranjit Dutta	Bharatiya Janata Party
78	Gohpur	Utpal Borah	Bharatiya Janata Party
79	Jagiroad (SC)	Pijush Hazarika	Bharatiya Janata Party
80	Marigaon	Rama Kanta Dewri	Bharatiya Janata Party
81	Laharighat	Nazrul Islam	Indian National Congress
82	Raha (SC)	Dimbeswar Das	Bharatiya Janata Party
83	Dhing	Aminul Islam	All India United Democratic Front
84	Batadroba	Angoorlata Deka	Bharatiya Janata Party
85	Rupohihat	Nurul Huda	Indian National Congress
86	Nowgong	Rupak Sarmah	Bharatiya Janata Party
87	Barhampur	Prafulla Kumar Mahanta	Asom Gana Parishad
88	Samaguri	Rakibul Hussain	Indian National Congress
89	Kaliabor	Keshab Mahanta	Asom Gana Parishad
90	Jamunamukh	Abdur Rahim Ajmal	All India United Democratic Front
91	Hojai	Shiladitya Dev	Bharatiya Janata Party
92	Lumding	Sibu Misra	Bharatiya Janata Party
93	Bokakhat	Atul Bora	Asom Gana Parishad
94	Sarupathar	Roselina Tirkey	Indian National Congress
95	Golaghat	Ajanta Neog	Indian National Congress
96	Khumtai	Mrinal Saikia	Bharatiya Janata Party
97	Dergaon (SC)	Bhabendra Nath Bharali	Asom Gana Parishad
98	Jorhat	Hitendra Nath Goswami	Bharatiya Janata Party
99	Majuli (ST)	Sarbananda Sonowal	Bharatiya Janata Party
100	Titabar	Tarun Gogoi	Indian National Congress
101	Mariani	Rupjyoti Kurmi	Indian National Congress
102	Teok	Renupoma Rajkhowa	Asom Gana Parishad
103	Amguri	Prodip Hazarika	Asom Gana Parishad
104	Nazira	Debabrata Saikia	Indian National Congress
105	Mahmara	Jogen Mohan	Bharatiya Janata Party
106	Sonari	Nabanita Handique	Bharatiya Janata Party
107	Thowra	Kushal Dowari	Bharatiya Janata Party
108	Sibsagar	Pranab Kumar Gogoi	Indian National Congress
109	Bihpuria	Debananda Hazarika	Bharatiya Janata Party
110	Naoboicha	Mamun Imdadul Haque Chawdhury	All India United Democratic Front
111	Lakhimpur	Utpal Dutta	Asom Gana Parishad
112	Dhakuakhana (ST)	Naba Kumar Doley	Bharatiya Janata Party
113	Dhemaji (ST)	Pradan Baruah	Bharatiya Janata Party
114	Jonai (ST)	Bhubon Pegu	Independent
115	Moran	Chakradhar Gogoi	Bharatiya Janata Party
116	Dibrugarh	Prasanta Phukan	Bharatiya Janata Party
117	Lahowal	Rituparna Baruah	Bharatiya Janata Party
118	Duliajan	Terash Gowalla	Bharatiya Janata Party
119	Tingkhong	Bimal Bora	Bharatiya Janata Party
120	Naharkatia	Naren Sonowal	Asom Gana Parishad
121	Chabua	Binod Hazarika	Bharatiya Janata Party
122	Tinsukia	Sanjoy Kishan	Bharatiya Janata Party
123	Digboi	Suren Phukan	Bharatiya Janata Party
124	Margherita	Bhaskar Sharma	Bharatiya Janata Party
125	Doomdooma	Durga Bhumij	Indian National Congress
126	Sadiya	Bolin Chetia	Bharatiya Janata Party
