= List of constituencies of the Assam Legislative Assembly =

Assam Legislative Assembly
- 13th Legislative Assembly of Assam

Type
- Type: Unicameral
- Term limits: 5 years
- Seats: 126

Elections
- Voting system: First past the post
- Last election: 2026

Meeting place
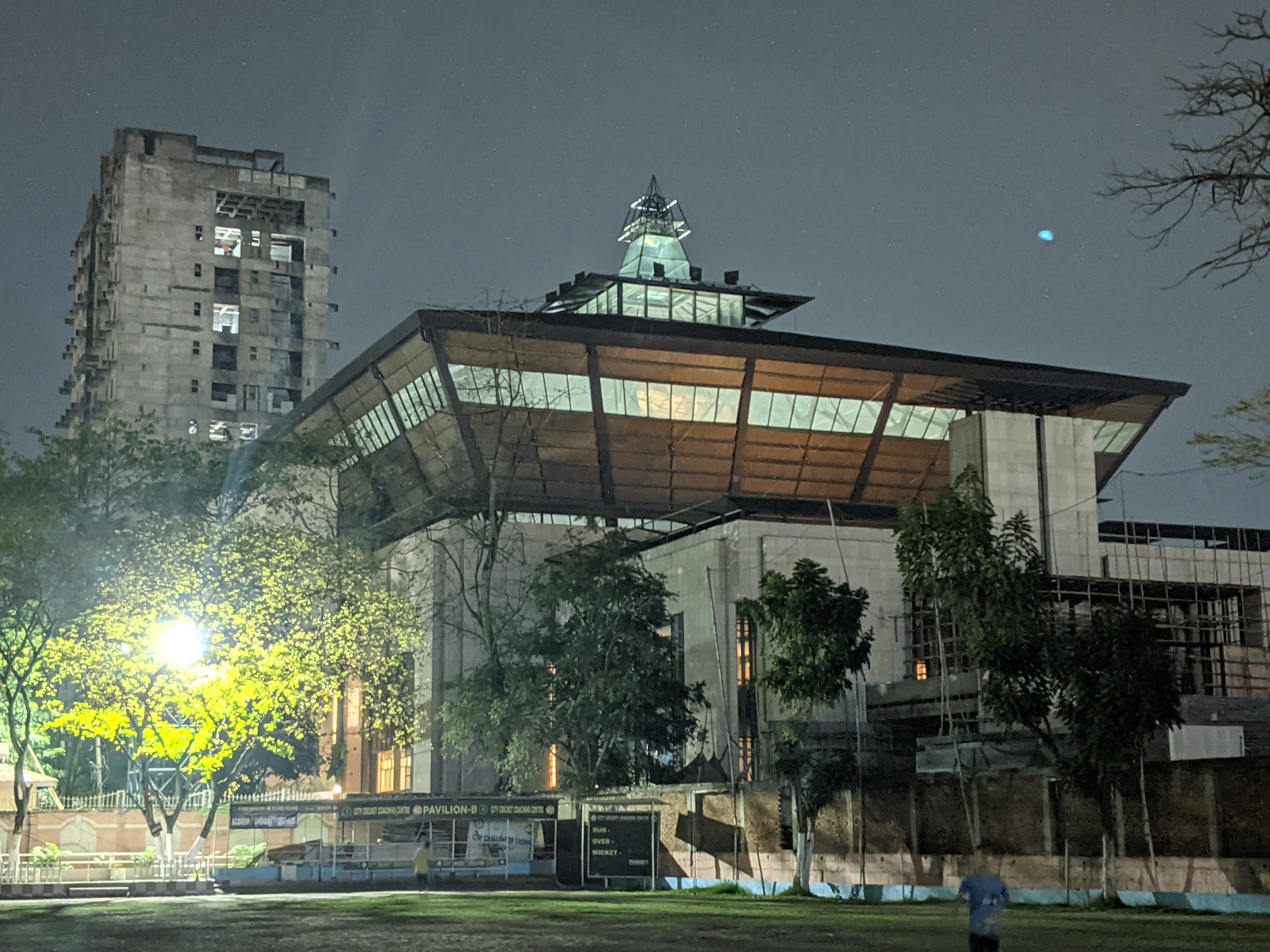
- Assam Legislative Assembly House, Dispur, Guwahati, Assam

Website
- https://assambidhansabha.org

Location of Assam (highlighted in red) within India

The Assam Legislative Assembly is the unicameral legislature of the Indian state of Assam. It is housed in Dispur, the capital of Assam, which is in the Western Assam region. The Legislative Assembly has 126 members, directly elected from single-seat constituencies. Its term is five years, unless dissolved early.

== History ==
The number of constituencies of Assam Legislative Assembly at the time of its inception on 7 April 1937 was 108. In 1957 it was reduced to 105. In 1962, the number of constituencies was enhanced to 114 and since 1972, it is 126. Since 1976, 8 constituencies are reserved for the Scheduled castes candidates and 16 constituencies are reserved for Scheduled tribes candidates. Dispur constituency in Kamrup Metropolitan district with 3.53 lakh voters is the largest constituency in Assam.

== Current constituencies ==
The constituencies of Assam (after the 2023 delimitation) with their reservation status indicated by colour.

The following is the list of the constituencies of Assam Legislative Assembly, since the delimitation of the legislative assembly constituencies in 2023.

Reservation

Scheduled Castes (SC)
Scheduled Tribes (ST)

Current constituencies of the Assam Legislative Assembly
#	Name	Reserved for (SC/ST/None)	District(s)	Lok Sabha constituency	Electors (2025)
1	Gossaigaon	None	Kokrajhar	Kokrajhar	
2	Dotma	ST	Kokrajhar	Kokrajhar	
3	Kokrajhar	ST	Kokrajhar	Kokrajhar	
4	Baokhungri	None	Kokrajhar	Kokrajhar	
5	Parbatjhora	None	Kokrajhar	Kokrajhar	
6	Golakganj	None	Dhubri	Dhubri	
7	Gauripur	None	Dhubri	Dhubri	
8	Dhubri	None	Dhubri	Dhubri	
9	Birsing Jarua	None	Dhubri	Dhubri	
10	Bilasipara	None	Dhubri	Dhubri	
11	Mankachar	None	South Salmara-Mankachar	Dhubri	
12	Jaleshwar	None	Goalpara	Dhubri	
13	Goalpara West	ST	Goalpara	Guwahati	
14	Goalpara East	None	Goalpara	Dhubri	
15	Dudhnai	ST	Goalpara	Guwahati	
16	Abhayapuri	None	Bongaigaon	Barpeta	
17	Srijangram	None	Bongaigaon	Dhubri	
18	Bongaigaon	None	Bongaigaon	Barpeta	
19	Sidli–Chirang	ST	Chirang	Kokrajhar	
20	Bijni	None	Chirang	Kokrajhar	
21	Bhowanipur–Sorbhog	None	Bajali	Barpeta	
22	Mandia	None	Barpeta	Dhubri	
23	Chenga	None	Barpeta	Dhubri	
24	Barpeta	SC	Barpeta	Barpeta	
25	Pakabetbari	None	Barpeta	Barpeta	
26	Bajali	None	Bajali	Barpeta	
27	Chamaria	None	Kamrup	Guwahati	
28	Boko–Chaygaon	ST	Kamrup	Guwahati	
29	Palasbari	None	Kamrup	Guwahati	
30	Hajo–Sualkuchi	SC	Kamrup	Barpeta	
31	Rangiya	None	Kamrup	Darrang–Udalguri	
32	Kamalpur	None	Kamrup	Darrang–Udalguri	
33	Dispur	None	Kamrup Metropolitan	Guwahati	
34	Dimoria	SC	Kamrup Metropolitan	Guwahati	
35	New Guwahati	None	Kamrup Metropolitan	Guwahati	
36	Guwahati Central	None	Kamrup Metropolitan	Guwahati	
37	Jalukbari	None	Kamrup Metropolitan	Guwahati	
38	Barkhetri	None	Nalbari	Barpeta	
39	Nalbari	None	Nalbari	Barpeta	
40	Tihu	None	Nalbari	Barpeta	
41	Manas	None	Baksa	Kokrajhar	
42	Baksa	ST	Baksa	Kokrajhar	
43	Tamulpur	ST	Tamulpur	Darrang–Udalguri	
44	Goreshwar	None	Tamulpur	Darrang–Udalguri	
45	Bhergaon	None	Udalguri	Darrang–Udalguri	
46	Udalguri	ST	Udalguri	Darrang–Udalguri	
47	Majbat	None	Udalguri	Darrang–Udalguri	
48	Tangla	None	Udalguri	Darrang–Udalguri	
49	Sipajhar	None	Darrang	Darrang–Udalguri	
50	Mangaldai	None	Darrang	Darrang–Udalguri	
51	Dalgaon	None	Darrang	Darrang–Udalguri	
52	Jagiroad	SC	Morigaon	Nagaon	
53	Laharighat	None	Morigaon	Nagaon	
54	Morigaon	None	Morigaon	Nagaon	
55	Dhing	None	Nagaon	Nagaon	
56	Rupohihat	None	Nagaon	Nagaon	
57	Kaliabor	None	Nagaon	Kaziranga	
58	Samaguri	None	Nagaon	Nagaon	
59	Barhampur	None	Nagaon	Kaziranga	
60	Nagaon–Batadraba	None	Nagaon	Nagaon	
61	Raha	SC	Nagaon	Nagaon	
62	Binnakandi	None	Hojai	Kaziranga	
63	Hojai	None	Hojai	Kaziranga	
64	Lumding	None	Hojai	Kaziranga	
65	Dhekiajuli	None	Sonitpur	Sonitpur	
66	Barchalla	None	Sonitpur	Sonitpur	
67	Tezpur	None	Sonitpur	Sonitpur	
68	Rangapara	None	Sonitpur	Sonitpur	
69	Nadaur	None	Sonitpur	Sonitpur	
70	Biswanath	None	Biswanath	Sonitpur	
71	Behali	SC	Biswanath	Sonitpur	
72	Gohpur	None	Biswanath	Sonitpur	
73	Bihpuria	None	Lakhimpur	Sonitpur	
74	Rongonadi	None	Lakhimpur	Lakhimpur	
75	Naoboicha	SC	Lakhimpur	Lakhimpur	
76	Lakhimpur	None	Lakhimpur	Lakhimpur	
77	Dhakuakhana	ST	Lakhimpur	Lakhimpur	
78	Dhemaji	ST	Dhemaji	Lakhimpur	
79	Sissiborgaon	None	Dhemaji	Lakhimpur	
80	Jonai	ST	Dhemaji	Lakhimpur	
81	Sadiya	None	Tinsukia	Lakhimpur	
82	Doom Dooma	None	Tinsukia	Lakhimpur	
83	Margherita	None	Tinsukia	Dibrugarh	
84	Digboi	None	Tinsukia	Dibrugarh	
85	Makum	None	Tinsukia	Dibrugarh	
86	Tinsukia	None	Tinsukia	Dibrugarh	
87	Chabua–Lahowal	None	Dibrugarh	Dibrugarh	
88	Dibrugarh	None	Dibrugarh	Dibrugarh	
89	Khowang	None	Dibrugarh	Dibrugarh	
90	Duliajan	None	Dibrugarh	Dibrugarh	
91	Tingkhong	None	Dibrugarh	Dibrugarh	
92	Naharkatia	None	Dibrugarh	Dibrugarh	
93	Sonari	None	Charaideo	Jorhat	
94	Mahmora	None	Charaideo	Jorhat	
95	Demow	None	Sibsagar	Jorhat	
96	Sibsagar	None	Sibsagar	Jorhat	
97	Nazira	None	Sibsagar	Jorhat	
98	Majuli	ST	Majuli	Jorhat	
99	Teok	None	Jorhat	Jorhat	
100	Jorhat	None	Jorhat	Jorhat	
101	Mariani	None	Jorhat	Jorhat	
102	Titabor	None	Jorhat	Jorhat	
103	Golaghat	None	Golaghat	Kaziranga	
104	Dergaon	None	Golaghat	Kaziranga	
105	Bokakhat	None	Golaghat	Kaziranga	
106	Khumtai	None	Golaghat	Kaziranga	
107	Sarupathar	None	Golaghat	Kaziranga	
108	Bokajan	ST	Karbi Anglong	Diphu	
109	Howraghat	ST	Karbi Anglong	Diphu	
110	Diphu	ST	Karbi Anglong	Diphu	
111	Rongkhang	ST	West Karbi Anglong	Diphu	
112	Amri	ST	West Karbi Anglong	Diphu	
113	Haflong	ST	Dima Hasao	Diphu	
114	Lakhipur	None	Cachar	Silchar	
115	Udharbond	None	Cachar	Silchar	
116	Katigorah	None	Cachar	Silchar	
117	Borkhola	None	Cachar	Silchar	
118	Silchar	None	Cachar	Silchar	
119	Sonai	None	Cachar	Silchar	
120	Dholai	SC	Cachar	Silchar	
121	Hailakandi	None	Hailakandi	Karimganj	
122	Algapur–Katlicherra	None	Hailakandi	Karimganj	
123	Karimganj North	None	Sribhumi	Karimganj	
124	Karimganj South	None	Sribhumi	Karimganj	
125	Patharkandi	None	Sribhumi	Karimganj	
126	Ram Krishna Nagar	SC	Sribhumi	Karimganj	

== Former constituencies ==
Map of old assembly constituencies of Assam in 2021

Following is the list of previous constituencies in the state of Assam before delimitation in 2023.

Reservation

Scheduled Castes (SC)
Scheduled Tribes (ST)

Former constituencies of the Assam Legislative Assembly
#	Name	Reserved for (SC/ST/None)	District(s)	Lok Sabha constituency	Electors (2021)
1	Ratabari	SC	Karimganj	Karimganj	173,974
2	Patharkandi	None	Karimganj	Karimganj	191,022
3	Karimganj North	None	Karimganj	Karimganj	199,784
4	Karimganj South	None	Karimganj	Karimganj	191,328
5	Badarpur	None	Karimganj	Karimganj	162,536
6	Hailakandi	None	Hailakandi	Karimganj	163,505
7	Katlicherra	None	Hailakandi	Karimganj	180,247
8	Algapur	None	Hailakandi	Karimganj	163,204
9	Silchar	None	Cachar	Silchar	234,821
10	Sonai	None	Cachar	Silchar	184,450
11	Dholai	SC	Cachar	Silchar	191,374
12	Udharbond	None	Cachar	Silchar	164,213
13	Lakhipur	None	Cachar	Silchar	166,933
14	Barkhola	None	Cachar	Silchar	152,761
15	Katigorah	None	Cachar	Silchar	189,031
16	Haflong	ST	Dima Hasao	Autonomous District	147,384
17	Bokajan	ST	Karbi Anglong	Autonomous District	150,392
18	Howraghat	ST	Karbi Anglong	Autonomous District	132,468
19	Diphu	ST	Karbi Anglong	Autonomous District	200,287
20	Baithalangso	ST	West Karbi Anglong	Autonomous District	210,649
21	Mankachar	None	South Salmara Mankachar	Dhubri	226,709
22	Salmara South	None	South Salmara Mankachar	Dhubri	189,264
23	Dhubri	None	Dhubri	Dhubri	196,081
24	Gauripur	None	Dhubri	Dhubri	205,588
25	Golakganj	None	Dhubri	Dhubri	203,940
26	Bilasipara West	None	Dhubri	Dhubri	173,884
27	Bilasipara East	None	Dhubri	Dhubri	218,549
28	Gossaigaon	None	Kokrajhar	Kokrajhar	189,510
29	Kokrajhar West	ST	Kokrajhar	Kokrajhar	184,635
30	Kokrajhar East	ST	Kokrajhar	Kokrajhar	187,298
31	Sidli	ST	Chirang	Kokrajhar	205,936
32	Bongaigaon	None	Bongaigaon	Barpeta	177,417
33	Bijni	None	Chirang	Kokrajhar	162,014
34	Abhayapuri North	None	Bongaigaon	Barpeta	182,297
35	Abhayapuri South	SC	Bongaigaon	Barpeta	207,844
36	Dudhnai	ST	Goalpara	Gauhati	207,571
37	Goalpara East	None	Goalpara	Dhubri	223,041
38	Goalpara West	None	Goalpara	Dhubri	175,037
39	Jaleswar	None	Goalpara	Dhubri	159,967
40	Sorbhog	None	Barpeta	Kokrajhar	230,013
41	Bhabanipur	None	Bajali	Kokrajhar	148,961
42	Patacharkuchi	None	Bajali	Barpeta	146,084
43	Barpeta	None	Barpeta	Barpeta	208,957
44	Jania	None	Barpeta	Barpeta	212,157
45	Baghbar	None	Barpeta	Barpeta	165,903
46	Sarukhetri	None	Barpeta	Barpeta	206,383
47	Chenga	None	Barpeta	Barpeta	145,283
48	Boko	SC	Kamrup	Gauhati	237,220
49	Chaygaon	None	Kamrup	Gauhati	192,780
50	Palasbari	None	Kamrup	Gauhati	158,743
51	Jalukbari	None	Kamrup Metro	Gauhati	204,691
52	Dispur	None	Kamrup Metro	Gauhati	412,114
53	Gauhati East	None	Kamrup Metro	Gauhati	239,587
54	Gauhati West	None	Kamrup Metro	Gauhati	297,063
55	Hajo	None	Kamrup	Gauhati	178,022
56	Kamalpur	None	Kamrup	Mangaldoi	180,737
57	Rangiya	None	Kamrup	Mangaldoi	196,103
58	Tamulpur	None	Baksa	Kokrajhar	215,552
59	Nalbari	None	Nalbari	Mangaldoi	207,754
60	Barkhetry	None	Nalbari	Gauhati	196,918
61	Dharmapur	None	Nalbari	Barpeta	141,911
62	Barama	ST	Baksa	Kokrajhar	169,810
63	Chapaguri	ST	Baksa	Kokrajhar	161,197
64	Panery	None	Udalguri	Mangaldoi	155,719
65	Kalaigaon	None	Darrang	Mangaldoi	184,450
66	Sipajhar	None	Darrang	Mangaldoi	178,319
67	Mangaldoi	SC	Darrang	Mangaldoi	237,615
68	Dalgaon	None	Darrang	Mangaldoi	240,796
69	Udalguri	ST	Udalguri	Mangaldoi	158,724
70	Majbat	None	Udalguri	Mangaldoi	160,324
71	Dhekiajuli	None	Sonitpur	Tezpur	217,766
72	Barchalla	None	Sonitpur	Tezpur	174,036
73	Tezpur	None	Sonitpur	Tezpur	188,449
74	Rangapara	None	Sonitpur	Tezpur	166,718
75	Sootea	None	Sonitpur	Tezpur	190,981
76	Biswanath	None	Biswanath	Tezpur	165,903
77	Behali	None	Biswanath	Tezpur	125,542
78	Gohpur	None	Biswanath	Tezpur	204,613
79	Jagiroad	SC	Marigaon	Nowgong	238,898
80	Marigaon	None	Marigaon	Nowgong	193,079
81	Laharighat	None	Marigaon	Nowgong	186,704
82	Raha	SC	Nagaon	Nowgong	221,878
83	Dhing	None	Nagaon	Kaliabor	231,325
84	Batadroba	None	Nagaon	Kaliabor	166,352
85	Rupohihat	None	Nagaon	Kaliabor	202,820
86	Nowgong	None	Nagaon	Nowgong	189,965
87	Barhampur	None	Nagaon	Nowgong	179,641
88	Samaguri	None	Nagaon	Kaliabor	165,045
89	Kaliabor	None	Nagaon	Kaliabor	147,083
90	Jamunamukh	None	Hojai	Nowgong	221,863
91	Hojai	None	Hojai	Nowgong	266,431
92	Lumding	None	Hojai	Nowgong	212,304
93	Bokakhat	None	Golaghat	Kaliabor	147,846
94	Sarupathar	None	Golaghat	Kaliabor	267,596
95	Golaghat	None	Golaghat	Kaliabor	205,586
96	Khumtai	None	Golaghat	Kaliabor	141,259
97	Dergaon	SC	Golaghat	Kaliabor	174,870
98	Jorhat	None	Jorhat	Jorhat	186,273
99	Majuli	ST	Majuli	Lakhimpur	132,403
100	Titabar	None	Jorhat	Jorhat	156,559
101	Mariani	None	Jorhat	Jorhat	123,568
102	Teok	None	Jorhat	Jorhat	136,829
103	Amguri	None	Sibsagar	Jorhat	124,891
104	Nazira	None	Sibsagar	Jorhat	133,974
105	Mahmara	None	Charaideo	Jorhat	138,108
106	Sonari	None	Charaideo	Jorhat	178,790
107	Thowra	None	Sibsagar	Jorhat	116,000
108	Sibsagar	None	Sibsagar	Jorhat	152,087
109	Bihpuria	None	Lakhimpur	Tezpur	153,050
110	Naoboicha	None	Lakhimpur	Lakhimpur	227,134
111	Lakhimpur	None	Lakhimpur	Lakhimpur	190,056
112	Dhakuakhana	ST	Lakhimpur	Lakhimpur	211,004
113	Dhemaji	ST	Dhemaji	Lakhimpur	248,047
114	Jonai	ST	Dhemaji	Lakhimpur	312,180
115	Moran	None	Dibrugarh	Dibrugarh	143,170
116	Dibrugarh	None	Dibrugarh	Dibrugarh	150,348
117	Lahowal	None	Dibrugarh	Dibrugarh	154,651
118	Duliajan	None	Dibrugarh	Dibrugarh	166,137
119	Tingkhong	None	Dibrugarh	Dibrugarh	149,731
120	Naharkatia	None	Dibrugarh	Dibrugarh	142,035
121	Chabua	None	Dibrugarh	Lakhimpur	165,934
122	Tinsukia	None	Tinsukia	Dibrugarh	173,562
123	Digboi	None	Tinsukia	Dibrugarh	140,259
124	Margherita	None	Tinsukia	Dibrugarh	196,210
125	Doomdooma	None	Tinsukia	Lakhimpur	152,632
126	Sadiya	None	Tinsukia	Lakhimpur	189,854
