= 2026 Assam Legislative Assembly election =

- 9 April 2026

All 126 seats in the Assam Legislative Assembly 64 seats needed for a majority
- Opinion polls
- Registered: 24,958,139
- Turnout: 85.96% (▲3.54 pp)
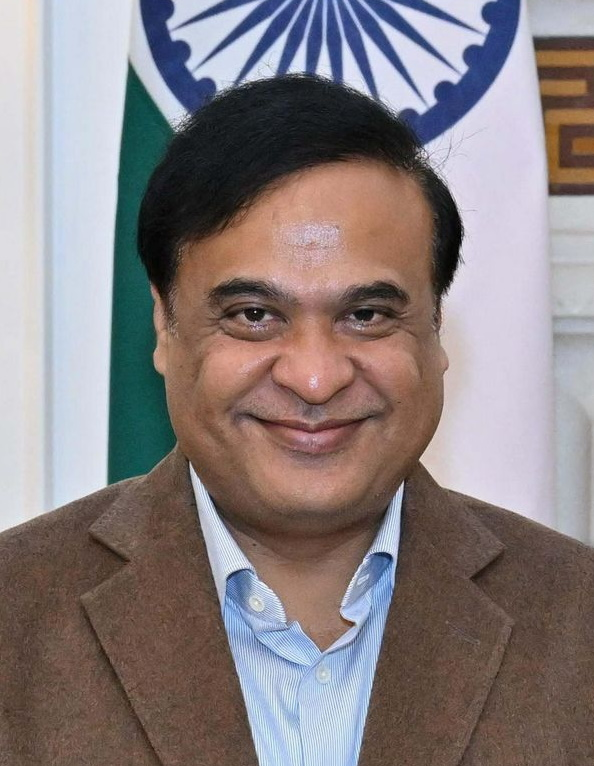

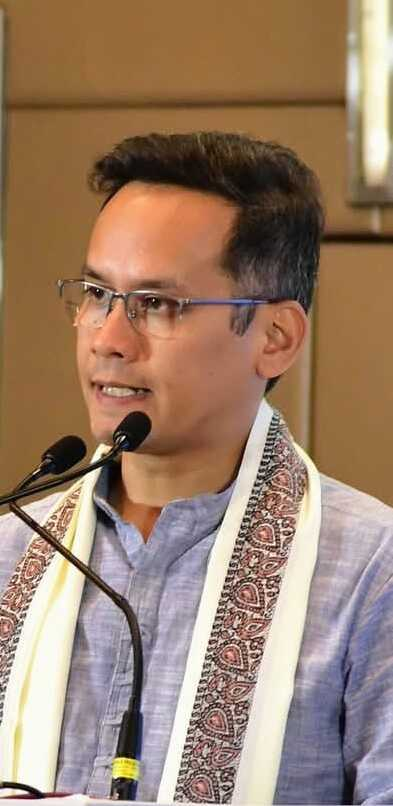
	Majority party	Minority party
Leader	Himanta Biswa Sarma	Gaurav Gogoi
Party	BJP	INC
Alliance	NEDA	ASM
Leader since	2021	2025
Leader's seat	Jalukbari (won)	Jorhat (lost)
Last election	33.21%, 60 seats	29.67%, 29 seats
Seats won	82	19
Seat change	▲22	▼10
Popular vote	8,192,787	6,464,216
Percentage	37.81%	29.84%
Swing	▲4.60 pp	▲0.17 pp
Alliance seats	102	21
Seat change	▲27	▼29
Alliance vote	1,04,03,165	77,90,232
Alliance percentage	48.02%	35.95%
Alliance swing	▲3.50 pp	▼7.73 pp

Chief Minister before election
Himanta Biswa Sarma
BJP
Elected Chief Minister
Himanta Biswa Sarma
BJP

The 2026 Assam Legislative Assembly election was the 16th quinquennial legislative assembly election held in the Indian state of Assam on April 9 to elect 126 MLAs to the 16th Assam Legislative Assembly. The votes were counted and the result declared on Monday, 4 May. The election results were a landslide victory for the NDA and recorded the lowest tally of seats ever won by the INC in the state.

== Background ==
The tenure of the Assam Legislative Assembly was scheduled to end on 20 May 2026. The previous assembly elections were held in March–April 2021. After the election, the incumbent National Democratic Alliance formed the state government again after winning 75 out of 126 seats in the assembly, with Himanta Biswa Sarma becoming Chief Minister.

In August 2021, the Indian National Congress ended its alliance with the All India United Democratic Front and the Bodoland People's Front, effectively ending the opposition bloc 'Mahajot'.

== Schedule ==
The Election Commission of India announced the schedule for the election on 15 March 2026.

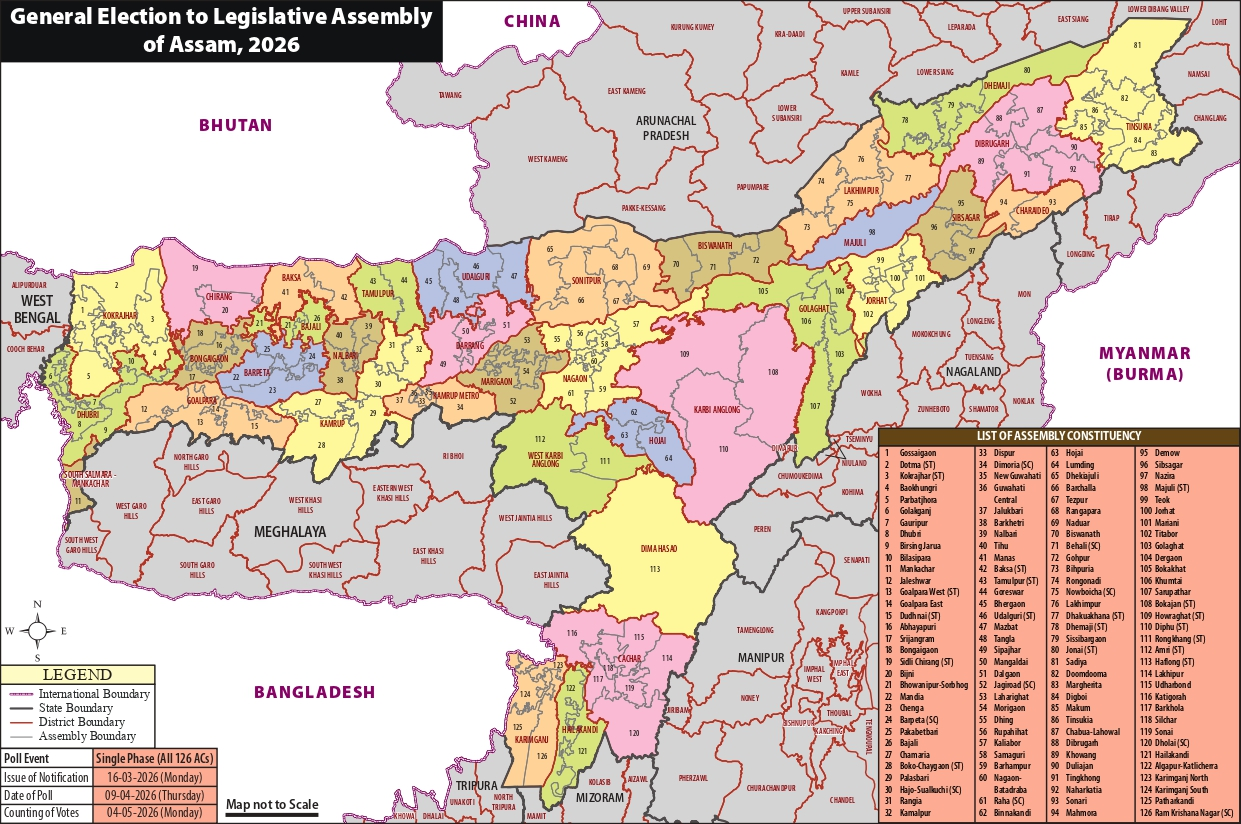

Event	Date
Date of notification	16 March 2026
Last date for filing nominations	23 March 2026
Scrutiny of nominations	24 March 2026
Last date for withdrawal of nomination	26 March 2026
Date of Polling	9 April 2026
Date of Counting of votes	4 May 2026
Deadline for completion of the election process	6 May 2026

== Voter statistics ==
According to the Election Commission of India, 2,49,58,139 voters were eligible to vote in the assembly elections in Assam. This includes 1,24,82,213 male, 1,24,75,583 female, and 343 third gender voters.

== Parties and alliances ==
=== National Democratic Alliance ===
The BJP did not enter into seat sharing talks with the UPPL and finalised the seat sharing in the Bodoland Territorial Region with the BPF. On 17 March 2026, UPPL left the National Democratic Alliance (NDA) over seat-sharing disputes. The NDA's seat sharing was finalised on 17 March 2026.

National Democratic Alliance
2026 Assam Legislative Assembly Election NDA Seat Sharing Map
Party	Flag	Symbol	Leader	Seats	
Bharatiya Janata Party			Himanta Biswa Sarma	87	90 (Note: BJP and AGP had a friendly contest in Sibsagar constituency.)
Rabha Hasong Joutha Mancha			Tankeswar Rabha	3	90
Asom Gana Parishad			Atul Bora	26	
Bodoland People's Front			Hagrama Mohilary	11	
Total				125+1	

=== Asom Sonmilito Morcha ===
In November 2025, the Asom Sonmilito Morcha was revived when 8 political parties led by the Congress formed an alliance against the BJP and its allies.

Asom Sonmilito Morcha
2026 Assam Legislative Assembly Election ASM Seat Sharing Map
Party	Flag	Symbol	Leader	Seats
Indian National Congress			Gaurav Gogoi	99 (Note: INC and RD had friendly contests in Gauripur and Goalpara East constituencies.) (Note: ASOM supported CPI(ML)L in Behali constituency, CPIMLL contesting total 3 seats.)
Raijor Dal			Akhil Gogoi	13
Assam Jatiya Parishad			Lurinjyoti Gogoi	10
Communist Party of India (Marxist)			Suprakash Talukdar	2
Communist Party of India (Marxist–Leninist) Liberation			Bibek Das	3
Independent (Note: Two APHLC candidates contesting on scissor symbol.)				2 (Note: 2 APHLC candidates contested as independents.)
Total				122+3

=== Others ===
Party	Flag	Symbol	Leader	Seats
All India United Democratic Front			Badruddin Ajmal	30
All India Trinamool Congress			Sushmita Dev	22
United People's Party Liberal			Urkhao Gwra Brahma	18
Aam Aadmi Party			Bhaben Choudhury	18
Jharkhand Mukti Morcha			Vinod Kumar	16
Communist Party of India			Kanak Gogoi	3
National People's Party			Dilip Kumar Borah	2

== Candidates ==
The BJP released the first list of 88 candidates on 19 March 2026, and the second list of 2 candidates on 21 March 2026. The AGP released its list of 26 candidates on 19 March 2026. The BPF released its list of 11 candidates on 19 March 2026.

The Congress released the first list of 42 candidates on 3 March 2026. the second list of 23 candidates on 14 March 2026; the third list of 22 candidates on 19 March 2026; the fourth list of 7 candidates on 20 March 2026; and the fifth list of 7 candidates on 22 March 2026. The CPI(M) released its first list of 2 candidates on 16 March 2026. APHLC released the first list of 2 candidates on 16 March 2026. AJP released the first list of 8 candidates on 17 March 2026; the second list of 2 candidates on 19 March 2026. Raijor Dal released the updated list of 13 candidates on 22 March 2026.

District	Constituency					
District	Constituency		NDA		ASOM	
Kokrajhar	1	Gossaigaon	BPF	Sabharam Basumatary	INC	Joseph Hasda
Kokrajhar	2	Dotma (ST)	BPF	Rabiram Narzary	INC	Birkhang Boro
Kokrajhar	3	Kokrajhar (ST)	BPF	Sewli Mohilary	INC	Manik Chandra Brahma
Kokrajhar	4	Baokhungri	BPF	Rupam Roy	INC	Sapali Marak
Kokrajhar	5	Parbatjhora	BPF	Rezaul Karim	INC	Md. Ashraful Islam Sheikh
Dhubri	6	Golakganj	BJP	Ashwini Roy Sarkar	INC	Kartik Chandra Ray
Dhubri	7	Gauripur	AGP	Mehtabul Haque	INC	Abdus Sobahan Ali Sarkar
Dhubri	7	Gauripur	AGP	Mehtabul Haque	RD	Abul Mia
Dhubri	8	Dhubri	BJP	Uttam Prasad	INC	Baby Begum
Dhubri	9	Birsing Jarua	BJP	Madhavi Das	INC	Wazed Ali Choudhury
Dhubri	10	Bilasipara	AGP	Jibesh Rai	INC	Amrit Badsha
South Salmara-Mankachar	11	Mankachar	AGP	Zabed Islam	INC	Mohibur Rohman
Goalpara	12	Jaleshwar	AGP	Abu Sha Shadi Hossain	INC	Aftab Uddin Mollah
Goalpara	13	Goalpara West (ST)	BJP	Pabitra Rabha	INC	Markline Marak
Goalpara	14	Goalpara East	AGP	Abdur Rahim Zibran	INC	Abul Kalam Rasheed Alam
Goalpara	14	Goalpara East	AGP	Abdur Rahim Zibran	RD	Abdur Rashid Mandal
Goalpara	15	Dudhnai (ST)	BJP	Tankeshwar Rabha	INC	Kishor Kumar Brahma
Bongaigaon	16	Abhayapuri	BJP	Bhupen Roy	INC	Pradip Sarkar
Bongaigaon	17	Srijangram	AGP	Shahidul Islam	INC	Nurul Islam
Bongaigaon	18	Bongaigaon	AGP	Diptimayee Choudhury	INC	Girish Baruah
Chirang	19	Sidli–Chirang (ST)	BPF	Paniram Brahma	INC	Matilal Narzary
Chirang	20	Bijni	BJP	Arup Kumar Dey	INC	Rajat Kanti Saha
Bajali	21	Bhowanipur–Sorbhog	BJP	Ranjeet Kumar Dass	CPI(M)	Manoranjan Talukdar
Barpeta	22	Mandia	BJP	Badal Chandra Arya	INC	Abdul Khaleque
Barpeta	23	Chenga	AGP	Saddam Hussein	INC	Abdur Rahim Ahmed
Barpeta	24	Barpeta (SC)	AGP	Kumar Deepak Das	None	— (Note: Nomination of Mahananda Sarkar was rejected.)
Barpeta	25	Pakabetbari	AGP	Tara Prasad Das	INC	Jakir Hussain Sikdar
Bajali	26	Bajali	AGP	Dharmeshwar Roy	AJP	Dilip Baruah
Kamrup	27	Chamaria	AGP	Nurul Islam	INC	Rekibuddin Ahmed
Kamrup	28	Boko–Chaygaon (ST)	BJP	Raju Mesh	INC	Ramen Singh Rabha
Kamrup	29	Palasbari	BJP	Himangshu Shekhar Baishya	AJP	Pankaj Lochan Goswami
Kamrup	30	Hajo–Sualkuchi (SC)	AGP	Prakash Chandra Das	INC	Nandita Das
Kamrup	31	Rangiya	BJP	Bhabesh Kalita	INC	Pranjit Choudhary
Kamrup	32	Kamalpur	BJP	Diganta Kalita	INC	Satyabrat Kalita
Kamrup Metropolitan	33	Dispur	BJP	Pradyut Bordoloi	INC	Mira Borthakur Goswami
Kamrup Metropolitan	34	Dimoria (SC)	AGP	Tapan Das	INC	Kishor Kumar Baruah
Kamrup Metropolitan	35	New Guwahati	BJP	Diplu Ranjan Sarmah	INC	Shantunu Borah
Kamrup Metropolitan	36	Guwahati Central	BJP	Vijay Kumar Gupta	AJP	Kunki Chaudhary
Kamrup Metropolitan	37	Jalukbari	BJP	Himanta Biswa Sarma	INC	Bidisha Neog
Nalbari	38	Barkhetri	BJP	Narayan Deka	INC	Diganta Barman
Nalbari	39	Nalbari	BJP	Jayanta Malla Baruah	INC	Ashok Kumar Sarma
Nalbari	40	Tihu	BJP	Chandra Mohan Patowary	INC	Ratul Patuwary
Baksa	41	Manas	BPF	Thaneswar Basumatary	RD	Anjan Talukdar
Baksa	42	Baksa (ST)	BPF	Maneswar Brahma	INC	Jagadish Madahi
Tamulpur	43	Tamulpur (ST)	BJP	Biswajit Daimary	INC	Rafie Daimary
Tamulpur	44	Goreshwar	BJP	Victor Kumar Das	CPI(M)	Bapu Ram Boro
Udalguri	45	Bhergaon	BPF	Maheswar Baro	INC	Anchula Gwara Daimary
Udalguri	46	Udalguri (ST)	BPF	Rihon Daimary	INC	Soren Daimari
Udalguri	47	Majbat	BPF	Charan Boro	INC	Narayan Adhikari
Udalguri	48	Tangla	BJP	Bikan Chandra Deka	INC	Rohit Pariga
Darrang	49	Sipajhar	BJP	Paramananda Rajbongshi	INC	Binanda Kumar Saikia
Darrang	50	Mangaldai	BJP	Nilima Devi	INC	Rijumoni Talukdar
Darrang	51	Dalgaon	BJP	Krishna Saha	RD	Ajijur Rahman
Morigaon	52	Jagiroad (SC)	BJP	Pijush Hazarika	INC	Bubul Das
Morigaon	53	Laharighat	AGP	Khalilur Rahaman	INC	Dr. Asif Mohamad Nazar
Morigaon	54	Morigaon	BJP	Rama Kanta Dewri	AJP	Bani Das
Nagaon	55	Dhing	BJP	Mukut Kumar Debnath	RD	Mehboob Mukhtar
Nagaon	56	Rupohihat	AGP	Jakir Hussain Farazi	INC	Nurul Huda
Nagaon	57	Kaliabor	AGP	Keshab Mahanta	RD	Pradip Kumar Baruah
Nagaon	58	Samaguri	BJP	Anil Saikia	INC	Tanzil Hussain
Nagaon	59	Barhampur	BJP	Jitu Goswami	AJP	Rajen Gohain
Nagaon	60	Nagaon–Batadraba	BJP	Rupak Sarmah	INC	Dr. Durlav Chamua
Nagaon	61	Raha (SC)	BJP	Sashi Kanta Das	INC	Utpal Bania
Hojai	62	Binnakandi	AGP	Sahabuddin Mazumdar	AJP	Rejaul Karim Chowdhury
Hojai	63	Hojai	BJP	Shiladitya Dev	INC	Jhilli Choudhury
Hojai	64	Lumding	BJP	Sibu Misra	INC	Swapan Kar
Sonitpur	65	Dhekiajuli	BJP	Ashok Singhal	INC	Batash Urang
Sonitpur	66	Barchalla	BJP	Ritu Baran Sarmah	INC	Ripun Bora
Sonitpur	67	Tezpur	AGP	Prithiraj Rava	RD	Alok Nath
Sonitpur	68	Rangapara	BJP	Krishna Kamal Tanti	INC	Kartik Chandra Kurmi
Sonitpur	69	Nadaur	BJP	Padma Hazarika	INC	Sunil Chetry
Biswanath	70	Biswanath	BJP	Pallab Lochan Das	INC	Jayanta Borah
Biswanath	71	Behali (SC)	BJP	Munindra Das	CPI(ML)L	Gyanendra Sarkar
Biswanath	72	Gohpur	BJP	Utpal Borah	INC	Sankar Jyoti Kutum
Lakhimpur	73	Bihpuria	BJP	Bhupen Kumar Borah	INC	Narayan Bhuyan
Lakhimpur	74	Rongonadi	BJP	Rishiraj Hazarika	INC	Joyonto Khaund
Lakhimpur	75	Naoboicha (SC)	AGP	Basanta Das	INC	Dr. Joy Prakash Das
Lakhimpur	76	Lakhimpur	BJP	Manab Deka	INC	Ghana Buragohain
Lakhimpur	77	Dhakuakhana (ST)	BJP	Naba Kumar Doley	INC	Ananda Narah
Dhemaji	78	Dhemaji (ST)	BJP	Ranoj Pegu	INC	Sailen Sonowal
Dhemaji	79	Sissiborgaon	BJP	Jiban Gogoi	RD	Dulal Chandra Barua
Dhemaji	80	Jonai (ST)	BJP	Bhubon Pegu	INC	Raj Kumar Medak
Tinsukia	81	Sadiya	BJP	Bolin Chetia	AJP	Jagadish Bhuyan
Tinsukia	82	Doom Dooma	BJP	Rupesh Gowala	INC	Durga Bhumij
Tinsukia	83	Margherita	BJP	Bhaskar Sharma	RD	Rahul Chetry
Tinsukia	84	Digboi	BJP	Suren Phukan	RD	Dulal Moran
Tinsukia	85	Makum	BJP	Sanjoy Kishan	INC	Sibanath Chetia
Tinsukia	86	Tinsukia	BJP	Pulok Gohain	INC	Devid Phukan
Dibrugarh	87	Chabua–Lahowal	BJP	Binod Hazarika	INC	Pranjal Ghatowar
Dibrugarh	88	Dibrugarh	BJP	Prasanta Phukan	AJP	Mounak Patra
Dibrugarh	89	Khowang	BJP	Chakradhar Gogoi	AJP	Lurinjyoti Gogoi
Dibrugarh	90	Duliajan	BJP	Rameshwar Teli	INC	Dhruba Gogoi
Dibrugarh	91	Tingkhong	BJP	Bimal Bora	INC	Bipul Gogoi
Dibrugarh	92	Naharkatia	BJP	Taranga Gogoi	INC	Pranati Phukan
Charaideo	93	Sonari	BJP	Dharmeswar Konwar	INC	Utpal Gogoi
Charaideo	94	Mahmora	BJP	Suruj Dehingia	INC	Gyandip Mohan
Sibsagar	95	Demow	BJP	Sushanta Borgohain	INC	Ajoy Kumar Gogoi
Sibsagar	96	Sibsagar	BJP	Kushal Dowari	RD	Akhil Gogoi
Sibsagar	96	Sibsagar	AGP	Prodip Hazarika	RD	Akhil Gogoi
Sibsagar	97	Nazira	BJP	Mayur Borgohain	INC	Debabrata Saikia
Majuli	98	Majuli (ST)	BJP	Bhuban Gam	INC	Indraneel Pegu
Jorhat	99	Teok	AGP	Bikash Saikia	INC	Pallabi Saikia Gogoi
Jorhat	100	Jorhat	BJP	Hitendra Nath Goswami	INC	Gaurav Gogoi
Jorhat	101	Mariani	BJP	Rupjyoti Kurmi	RD	Gyanashree Bora
Jorhat	102	Titabor	BJP	Dhiraj Gowala	INC	Pran Kurmi
Golaghat	103	Golaghat	BJP	Ajanta Neog	INC	Bitupan Saikia
Golaghat	104	Dergaon	BJP	Mridul Kumar Dutta	INC	Sagorika Bora
Golaghat	105	Bokakhat	AGP	Atul Bora	RD	Hari Prasad Saikia
Golaghat	106	Khumtai	BJP	Mrinal Saikia	INC	Roselina Tirkey
Golaghat	107	Sarupathar	BJP	Biswajit Phukan	AJP	Jibon Chutia
Karbi Anglong	108	Bokajan (ST)	BJP	Surjya Rongphar	INC	Raton Engti
Karbi Anglong	109	Howraghat (ST)	BJP	Lunsing Teron	INC	Sanjeeb Teron
Karbi Anglong	110	Diphu (ST)	BJP	Niso Terangpi	IND	Jones Ingti Kathar
West Karbi Anglong	111	Rongkhang (ST)	BJP	Tuliram Ronghang	INC	Augustine Enghee
West Karbi Anglong	111	Rongkhang (ST)	BJP	Tuliram Ronghang	CPI(ML)L	Pratima Engherpi
West Karbi Anglong	112	Amri (ST)	BJP	Habbey Teron	IND	Bikram Hanse
Dima Hasao	113	Haflong (ST)	BJP	Rupali Langthasa	INC	Nandita Garlosa
Cachar	114	Lakhipur	BJP	Kaushik Rai	INC	Santi Kumar Singha
Cachar	115	Udharbond	BJP	Rajdeep Goala	INC	Ajit Singh
Cachar	116	Katigorah	BJP	Kamalakhya Dey Purkayastha	INC	Amar Chand Jain
Cachar	117	Borkhola	BJP	Kishor Nath	INC	Amit Kumar Kalwar
Cachar	118	Silchar	BJP	Dr. Rajdeep Roy	INC	Abhijit Paul
Cachar	119	Sonai	AGP	Karim Uddin Barbhuiya	INC	Aminul Haque Laskar
Cachar	120	Dholai (SC)	BJP	Amiya Kanti Das	INC	Dhrubjyoti Purkayastha
Hailakandi	121	Hailakandi	BJP	Dr. Milon Das	INC	Rahul Roy
Hailakandi	122	Algapur–Katlicherra	AGP	Zakir Hussain Laskar	INC	Zubair Anam Mazumder
Sribhumi	123	Karimganj North	BJP	Subrata Bhattacharjee	INC	Jakaria Ahmed
Sribhumi	124	Karimganj South	AGP	Ekbal Hussain	INC	Aminur Rashid Choudhary
Sribhumi	125	Patharkandi	BJP	Krishnendu Paul	INC	Kartik Sena Sinha
Sribhumi	126	Ram Krishna Nagar (SC)	BJP	Bijoy Malakar	INC	Suruchi Roy

== Surveys and polls ==
=== Opinion polls ===
Seat projections
Polling agency	Date published	Sample size	Margin of error				Lead
Polling agency	Date published	Sample size	Margin of error	NDA	ASOM	Others	Lead
IANS-Matrize	15 March 2026	11,912	±3%	96-98	26-28	2-8	68-72

Vote share projections
Polling agency	Date published	Sample size	Margin of error				Lead
Polling agency	Date published	Sample size	Margin of error	NDA	ASOM	Others	Lead
IANS-Matrize	15 March 2026	11,912	±3%	43-44%	39-40%	18-20%	3-5%

=== Exit polls ===
Seat projections
Polling agency	Date published	Margin of error				Lead
Polling agency	Date published	Margin of error	NDA	ASOM	Others	Lead
Peoples Pulse	29 April 2026	±3%	83-91	23-30	3-6	53-68
Vote Vibe	29 April 2026		90-100	23-33	0-6	57-77
Matrize	29 April 2026		89-95	25-32	06-12	57-70
JVC	29 April 2026		88-101	23-33	2-5	55-78
Axis My India	29 April 2026		88-100	24-36	0-3	52-76
Janmat	29 April 2026		87-98	29-30	0	57-69
P-Marq	29 April 2026		82-94	30-40	1-5	42-64
Today's Chanakya	30 April 2026	±9	102 ± 9	23 ± 9	1 ± 1	61-97
Overall Average			92	28-29	3-4	64-65
Actual Results			102	21	3	81

Vote share projections
Polling agency	Date published	Margin of error				Lead
Polling agency	Date published	Margin of error	NDA	ASOM	Others	Lead
Peoples Pulse	29 April 2026	±3%	51.1%	38.9%	10%	10%
Axis My India	29 April 2026		48%	38%	14%	10%
Today's Chanakya	30 April 2026	±3%	50%	38%	12%	12%
Overall Average			49.7%	38.3%	12%	10.7%
Actual Results			48.01%	35.95%	16.04%	12.06%

== Voting ==
According to the Election Commission of India, voting turnout was 84.8% for male voters, 85.96% for female voters, and 36.84% for third gender voters. The total voter turnout was 85.38%.

=== Voter turnout by district ===
District	Seats	Turnout
Kokrajhar	5	88.18%
Dhubri	5	95.21%
South Salmara Mankachar	1	95.61%
Goalpara	4	93.27%
Bongaigaon	3	92.77%
Chirang	2	86.97%
Bajali	2	87.58%
Barpeta	4	93.32%
Kamrup	6	88.25%
Kamrup Metro	5	77.51%
Nalbari	3	89.52%
Baksa	2	82.90%
Tamulpur	2	82.61%
Udalguri	4	83.39%
Darrang	3	91.64%
Morigaon	3	89.58%
Nagaon	7	88.59%
Hojai	3	88.38%
Sonitpur	5	83.56%
Biswanath	3	84.42%
Lakhimpur	5	86.31%
Dhemaji	3	79.74%
Tinsukia	6	79.36%
Dibrugarh	6	80.83%
Charaideo	2	83.27%
Sivasagar	3	83.57%
Majuli	1	83.76%
Jorhat	4	80.61%
Golaghat	5	82.07%
Karbi Anglong	3	80.09%
West Karbi Anglong	2	81.05%
Dima Hasao	1	82.48%
Cachar	7	83.86%
Hailakandi	2	82.58%
Sribhumi	4	84.99%
Total	126	85.96%

== Results ==
=== Results by alliance or party ===
Alliance/Party		Popular vote			Seats		
Alliance/Party		Vote	%	±pp	Contested	Won	+/-
NDA	BJP	8,192,787	37.81	▲4.60	90	82	▲22
NDA	AGP	1,402,832	6.48	▼1.42	26	10	▲1
NDA	BPF	807,546	3.73	▲0.34	11	10	▲6
NDA	Total	10,402,876	48.02	▲3.52	126	102	▲27
ASM	INC	6,464,216	29.84	▲0.17	99	19	▼20
ASM	RD	581,574	2.68	New	13	2	▲2
ASM	AJP	545,601	2.52	▼1.14	10	0	Steady
ASM	CPI(M)	102,190	0.47	▼0.37	2	0	▼1
ASM	CPI(ML)L	29,162	0.13	▼0.01	2	0	Steady
ASM	IND	67,489	0.31	New	2	0	Steady
ASM	Total	7,789,996	35.95	New	125 (Note: Friendly contests in three seats.)	21	New
AIUDF		1,182,913	5.46	▼3.83	27	2	▼14
AITC		193,365	0.89	▲0.89	23	1	▲1
UPPL		496,304	2.29	▼1.10	17	0	▼6
JMM		251,350	1.16	▲1.16	16	0	Steady
Others		133,564	0.62	▼3.88		0	Steady
IND		947,804	4.37	▼1.56		0	Steady
NOTA		267,191	1.23	▲0.09			
Total		21,665,363	100%	—		126	—

=== Results by districts ===
District	Seats			
District	Seats	NDA	ASM	OTH
Kokrajhar	5	4	1	—N/a
Dhubri	5	2	3	—N/a
South Salmara Mankachar	1	—N/a	1	—N/a
Goalpara	4	2	2	—N/a
Bongaigaon	3	2	1	—N/a
Chirang	2	2	—N/a	—N/a
Bajali	2	2	—N/a	—N/a
Barpeta	4	1	2	1
Kamrup	6	5	1	—N/a
Kamrup Metropolitan	5	5	—N/a	—N/a
Nalbari	3	3	—N/a	—N/a
Baksa	2	2	—N/a	—N/a
Tamulpur	2	2	—N/a	—N/a
Udalguri	4	4	—N/a	—N/a
Darrang	3	2	—N/a	1
Morigaon	3	2	1	—N/a
Nagaon	7	4	3	—N/a
Hojai	3	2	—N/a	1
Sonitpur	5	5	—N/a	—N/a
Biswanath	3	3	—N/a	—N/a
Lakhimpur	5	4	1	—N/a
Dhemaji	3	3	—N/a	—N/a
Tinsukia	6	6	—N/a	—N/a
Dibrugarh	6	6	—N/a	—N/a
Charaideo	2	2	—N/a	—N/a
Sivasagar	3	2	1	—N/a
Majuli	1	1	—N/a	—N/a
Jorhat	4	4	—N/a	—N/a
Golaghat	5	5	—N/a	—N/a
Karbi Anglong	3	3	—N/a	—N/a
West Karbi Anglong	2	2	—N/a	—N/a
Dima Hasao	1	1	—N/a	—N/a
Cachar	7	6	1	—N/a
Hailakandi	2	1	1	—N/a
Sribhumi	4	2	2	—N/a
Total	126	102	21	3

=== Results by division ===
District	Seats			
District	Seats	NDA	ASM	OTH
Lower Assam	44	32	11	1
North Assam	15	14	—N/a	1
Central Assam	19	14	4	1
Upper Assam	35	33	2	—N/a
Barak Valley	13	9	4	—N/a
Total	126	102	21	3

=== Results by constituency ===
District	Constituency		Winner				Runner-up				Margin	%
District	No.	Name	Candidate	Party	Votes	%	Candidate	Party	Votes	%	Margin	%
Kokrajhar	1	Gossaigaon	Sabharam Basumatary	BPF	44,394	44.35	Phedricson Hansdak	JMM	21,417	21.40	22,977	22.95
Kokrajhar	2	Dotma (ST)	Rabiram Narzary	BPF	48,775	51.74	Raju Kumar Narzary	UPPL	24,492	25.98	24,283	25.75
Kokrajhar	3	Kokrajhar (ST)	Sewli Mohilary	BPF	74,816	60.84	Lawrence Islary	UPPL	35,183	28.61	39,633	32.23
Kokrajhar	4	Baokhungri	Rupam Chandra Roy	BPF	62,677	41.95	Sapali Marak	INC	38,967	26.08	23,710	15.86
Kokrajhar	5	Parbatjhora	Md. Ashraful Islam Sheikh	INC	77,128	46.95	Rezaul Karim	BPF	68,106	41.46	9,022	5.49
Dhubri	6	Golakganj	Ashwini Roy Sarkar	BJP	1,10,533	56.88	Kartik Chandra Ray	INC	79,751	41.04	30,782	15.84
Dhubri	7	Gauripur	Abdus Sobahan Ali Sarkar	INC	1,82,971	61.12	Nijanur Rahman	AIUDF	63,874	21.34	119,097	39.78
Dhubri	8	Dhubri	Baby Begum	INC	1,18,362	53.64	Najrul Hoque	AIUDF	49,594	22.52	68,661	31.12
Dhubri	9	Birsing Jarua	Wazed Ali Choudhury	INC	1,13,901	41.53	Ali Akbar Miah	AIUDF	78,016	28.45	35,885	13.08
Dhubri	10	Bilasipara	Jibesh Rai	AGP	85,937	48.09	Amit Badsha	INC	83,012	46.59	2,694	1.50
South Salmara-Mankachar	11	Mankachar	Mohibur Rohman	INC	1,69,036	56.57	Zabed Islam	AGP	1,15,890	38.79	53,146	17.78
Goalpara	12	Jaleshwar	Aftab Uddin Mollah	INC	1,62,174	69.19	Sheikh Shah Alam	AIUDF	52,486	22.39	1,09,688	46.80
Goalpara	13	Goalpara West (ST)	Pabitra Rabha	BJP	92,216	62.51	Markline Marak	INC	52,299	35.45	39,917	27.06
Goalpara	14	Goalpara East	Abul Kalam Rasheed Alam	INC	102,205	46.99	Abdur Rahim Zibran	AGP	50,944	23.42	51,261	23.57
Goalpara	15	Dudhnai (ST)	Tankeswar Rabha	BJP	1,00,353	63.58	Kishore Kumar Brahma	INC	52,716	33.40	47,637	30.18
Bongaigaon	16	Abhayapuri	Bhupen Roy	BJP	1,11,154	66.22	Pradip Sarkar	INC	52,228	31.12	58,926	35.10
Bongaigaon	17	Srijangram	Md. Nurul Islam	INC	1,06,716	47.47	Rejaul Karim Laskar	AIUDF	88,411	39.33	18,305	8.14
Bongaigaon	18	Bongaigaon	Diptimayee Choudhury	AGP	72,247	46.08	Girish Baruah	INC	47,249	30.14	24,998	16.04
Chirang	19	Sidli–Chirang (ST)	Paniram Brahma	BPF	1,01,275	53.58	Ranjit Basumatary	UPPL	62,674	33.16	38,601	20.42
Chirang	20	Bijni	Arup Kumar Dey	BJP	71,708	43.44	Kamal Singh Narzary	UPPL	37,781	22.89	33,927	20.55
Bajali	21	Bhowanipur–Sorbhog	Ranjeet Kumar Dass	BJP	1,13,069	58.00	Manoranjan Talukdar	CPI(M)	73,917	37.91	39,152	20.09
Barpeta	22	Mandia	Sherman Ali Ahmed	AITC	1,13,480	43.07	Abdul Khaleque	INC	85,919	32.61	27,561	10.46
Barpeta	23	Chenga	Abdur Rahim Ahmed	INC	1,39,167	56.85	Ashraful Hussain	AIUDF	51,818	21.17	87,349	35.68
Barpeta	24	Barpeta (SC)	Dipak Kumar Das	AGP	94,086	62.88	Gagan Chandra Haloi	Ind	46,684	31.20	47,402	31.68
Barpeta	25	Pakabetbari	Jakir Hussain Sikdar	INC	1,57,448	60.06	Minakshi Rahman	AIUDF	92,481	35.21	47,402	24.85
Bajali	26	Bajali	Dharmeswar Roy	AGP	80,130	56.04	Dilip Baruah	AJP	55,684	38.94	24,446	17.10
Kamrup	27	Chamaria	Rekibuddin Ahmed	INC	1,49,720	63.83	Imdad Hussain	AIUDF	71,024	30.28	78,696	33.55
Kamrup	28	Boko–Chaygaon (ST)	Raju Mesh	BJP	1,07,113	63.77	Ramen Singh Rabha	INC	47,559	28.31	59,554	35.46
Kamrup	29	Palasbari	Himangshu Shekhar Baishya	BJP	1,09,301	58.58	Pankaj Lochan Goswami	AJP	65,348	35.02	43,953	23.56
Kamrup	30	Hajo–Sualkuchi	Prakash Chandra Das	AGP	81,699	47.84	Nandita Das	INC	80,975	47.41	724	0.43
Kamrup	31	Rangiya	Bhabesh Kalita	BJP	1,07,929	58.22	Pranjit Choudhury	INC	73,900	39.87	34,029	18.35
Kamrup	32	Kamalpur	Diganta Kalita	BJP	74,455	45.33	Satyabrat Kalita	INC	55,006	33.49	19,449	11.84
Kamrup Metropolitan	33	Dispur	Pradyut Bordoloi	BJP	1,03,337	55.89	Mira Borthakur Goswami	INC	53,670	29.03	49,667	26.86
Kamrup Metropolitan	34	Dimoria (SC)	Tapan Das	AGP	1,16,058	64.71	Kishor Kumar Baruah	INC	50,673	28.25	65,385	36.46
Kamrup Metropolitan	35	New Guwahati	Diplu Ranjan Sarmah	BJP	89,636	64.13	Shantunu Borah	INC	41,968	30.03	47,668	34.10
Kamrup Metropolitan	36	Guwahati Central	Vijay Kumar Gupta	BJP	1,01,927	68.87	Shantunu Borah	AJP	39,376	26.77	61,921	42.10
Kamrup Metropolitan	37	Jalukbari	Himanta Biswa Sarma	BJP	1,27,151	74.42	Bidisha Neog	INC	37,717	22.08	89,434	52.34
Nalbari	38	Barkhetri	Narayan Deka	BJP	1,13,001	56.07	Diganta Barman	INC	84,157	41.76	28,844	14.31
Nalbari	39	Nalbari	Jayanta Malla Baruah	BJP	1,18,611	64.98	Ashok Kumar Sarma	INC	58,510	32.05	60,101	32.93
Nalbari	40	Tihu	Chandra Mohan Patowary	BJP	1,00,855	56.26	Ashok Kumar Sarma	INC	74,359	41.48	26,496	14.78
Baksa	41	Manas	Thaneswar Basumatary	BPF	90,060	50.95	Anjan Talikdar	RD	42,650	24.13	47,410	26.82
Baksa	42	Baksa (ST)	Maneswar Brahma	BPF	88,820	55.06	Rakesh Brahma	UPPL	39,770	24.65	49,050	20.41
Tamulpur	43	Tamulpur (ST)	Biswajit Daimary	BJP	89,308	49.92	Pramod Boro	UPPL	62,565	34.97	26,743	14.95
Tamulpur	44	Goreshwar	Victor Kumar Das	BJP	98,108	57.54	Pabitra Kumar Baro	UPPL	28,859	16.93	69,249	40.61
Udalguri	45	Bhergaon	Maheswar Baro	BPF	67,105	50.22	Nerswn Boro	UPPL	29,308	21.94	37,797	28.28
Udalguri	46	Udalguri (ST)	Rihon Daimary	BPF	76,800	54.61	Dipen Boro	UPPL	49,246	35.01	27,554	19.60
Udalguri	47	Majbat	Charan Boro	BPF	84,718	53.48	Priti Rekha Barla	JMM	29,172	18.42	55,546	35.06
Udalguri	48	Tangla	Bikan Chandra Deka	BJP	84,309	54.82	Rohit Pariga	INC	29,708	19.32	54,601	35.50
Darrang	49	Sipajhar	Paramananda Rajbongshi	BJP	99,720	55.83	Binanda Kumar Saikia	INC	74,475	41.69	25,545	14.14
Darrang	50	Mangaldai	Nilima Devi	BJP	1,00,078	54.77	Rijumoni Talukdar	INC	76,142	41.67	23,936	13.10
Darrang	51	Dalgaon	Mazibur Rahman	AIUDF	1,47,555	48.50	Md. Aynul Hoque	Ind	1,18,675	39.01	28,880	9.49
Morigaon	52	Jagiroad (SC)	Pijush Hazarika	BJP	155,129	70.64	Sri Bubul Das	INC	61,545	28.03	93,584	42.61
Morigaon	53	Laharighat	Asif Mohammad Nazar	INC	169,212	57.78	Kholilur Rahman	AIUDF	102,917	35.14	66,295	22.64
Morigaon	54	Morigaon	Rama Kantha Dewri	BJP	117,942	66.53	Bani Das	AJP	52,453	29.59	65,489	36.96
Nagaon	55	Dhing	Mehboob Mukhtar	RD	131,182	59.60	Matiur Rahman	AIUDF	59,688	27.12	71,494	32.48
Nagaon	56	Rupohihat	Nurul Huda	INC	135,682	61.46	Aminul Islam	AIUDF	65,916	29.86	69,766	31.60
Nagaon	57	Kaliabor	Keshab Mahanta	AGP	74,029	45.10	Jiten Gour	Ind	56,139	34.20	17,890	10.90
Nagaon	58	Samaguri	Tanzil Hussain	INC	108,310	68.09	Anil Saikia	BJP	36,902	17.30	93,584	50.79
Nagaon	59	Barhampur	Jitu Goswami	BJP	117,127	59.54	Rajen Gohain	AJP	60,986	31.00	56,141	28.54
Nagaon	60	Nagaon–Batadraba	Rupak Sarmah	BJP	1,13,958	67.40	Durlav Chamua	INC	51,974	30.74	61,984	36.66
Nagaon	61	Raha (SC)	Sashi Kanta Das	BJP	111,360	53.43	Utpal Bania	INC	90,766	43.55	20,594	9.88
Hojai	62	Binnakandi	Badruddin Ajmal	AIUDF	119,721	50.54	Rejaul Karim Chowdhury	AJP	84,341	35.60	35,380	14.94
Hojai	63	Hojai	Shiladitya Dev	BJP	144,361	64.24	Jhilli Choudhury	INC	77,660	34.56	66,701	29.68
Hojai	64	Lumding	Sibu Misra	BJP	115,330	52.86	Swapan Kar	INC	93,216	42.72	22,114	10.14
Sonitpur	65	Dhekiajuli	Ashok Singhal	BJP	111,880	59.63	Batash Urang	INC	63,711	33.96	48,169	15.67
Sonitpur	66	Barchalla	Ritu Baran Sarmah	BJP	84,495	53.15	Ripun Bora	INC	59,933	37.70	24,562	15.45
Sonitpur	67	Tezpur	Prithiraj Rava	AGP	79,140	53.39	Alok Nath	RD	59,190	39.93	19,950	13.46
Sonitpur	68	Rangapara	Krishna Kamal Tanti	BJP	81,022	56.33	Kartik Chandra Kurmi	INC	37,707	26.22	43,315	30.11
Sonitpur	69	Nadaur	Padma Hazarika	BJP	111,125	64.55	Sunil Chetry	INC	58,209	33.81	52,916	30.74
Biswanath	70	Biswanath	Pallab Lochan Das	BJP	84,862	52.73	Jayanta Borah	INC	59,092	36.72	25,770	16.01
Biswanath	71	Behali (SC)	Munindra Das	BJP	87,224	65.86	Gyanendra Sarkar	CPML	26,521	20.03	60,703	45.83
Biswanath	72	Gohpur	Utpal Borah	BJP	96,582	65.72	Sankar Jyoti Kutum	INC	43,860	29.85	52,722	35.87
Lakhimpur	73	Bihpuria	Bhupen Kumar Borah	BJP	73,050	52.01	Narayan Bhuyan	INC	64,814	46.15	8,236	5.86
Lakhimpur	74	Rongonadi	Rishiraj Hazarika	BJP	82,493	51.29	Joyonto Khaund	INC	62,841	39.07	19,652	12.22
Lakhimpur	75	Naoboicha (SC)	Dr. Joy Prakash Das	INC	86,981	56.66	Basanta Das	AGP	63,230	41.19	23,751	15.47
Lakhimpur	76	Lakhimpur	Manab Deka	BJP	85,726	60.00	Ghana Buragohain	INC	53,506	37.45	32,220	22.55
Lakhimpur	77	Dhakuakhana (ST)	Naba Kumar Doley	BJP	92,123	67.51	Ananda Narah	INC	42,051	30.81	50,072	37.30
Dhemaji	78	Dhemaji (ST)	Dr Ranjoj Pegu	BJP	83,649	58.51	Sailen Sonowal	INC	51,420	35.96	32,229	22.55
Dhemaji	79	Sissiborgaon	Jiban Gogoi	BJP	75,758	52.07	Dulal Chandra Boruah	RD	35,165	24.17	40,593	27.90
Dhemaji	80	Jonai (ST)	Bhubon Pegu	BJP	128,940	71.57	Raj Kumar Medak	INC	48,816	27.10	80,124	44.47
Tinsukia	81	Sadiya	Bolin Chetia	BJP	97,087	60.74	Raj Kumar Medak	AJP	55,338	34.62	41,749	26.12
Tinsukia	82	Doom Dooma	Rupesh Gowala	BJP	86,009	70.79	Durga Bhumij	INC	30,627	25.21	55,382	45.58
Tinsukia	83	Margherita	Bhaskar Sharma	BJP	86,349	61.72	Rahul Chetry	RD	31,032	22.18	55,317	39.54
Tinsukia	84	Digboi	Suren Phukan	BJP	65,690	56.27	Dulal Moran	RD	24,561	21.09	41,073	25.18
Tinsukia	85	Makum	Sanjoy Kishan	BJP	74,694	57.62	Sibanath Chetia	INC	46,418	35.81	28,276	21.61
Tinsukia	86	Tinsukia	Pulok Gohain	BJP	85,184	62.72	Devid Phukan	INC	36,687	27.01	48,497	35.71
Dibrugarh	87	Chabua–Lahowal	Binod Hazarika	BJP	89,202	60.75	Pranjal Ghatowar	INC	38,288	26.08	50,914	34.73
Dibrugarh	88	Dibrugarh	Prasanta Phukan	BJP	106,803	67.79	Mainak Patra	AJP	34,760	22.06	72,043	45.73
Dibrugarh	89	Khowang	Chakradhar Gogoi	BJP	67,038	50.70	Lurinjyoti Gogoi	AJP	57,054	43.15	9,984	7.55
Dibrugarh	90	Duliajan	Rameswar Teli	BJP	71,467	49.81	Dhruba Gogoi	INC	61,008	42.52	10,459	7.29
Dibrugarh	91	Tingkhong	Bimal Bora	BJP	88,912	61.19	Pranjal Ghatowar	INC	39,886	27.45	49,026	33.74
Dibrugarh	92	Naharkatia	Taranga Gogoi	BJP	87,768	70.43	Pranati Phukan	INC	25,486	20.45	62,282	49.98
Charaideo	93	Sonari	Dharmeswar Konwar	BJP	74,833	52.06	Utpal Gogoi	INC	50,699	35.27	24,134	16.79
Charaideo	94	Mahmora	Suruj Dehingia	BJP	69,530	55.20	Jnyandip Mohan	INC	53,509	42.48	16,021	12.72
Sibsagar	95	Demow	Sushanta Borgohain	BJP	89,681	59.74	Ajoy Kumar Gogoi	INC	56,153	37.40	33,528	22.34
Sibsagar	96	Sibsagar	Akhil Gogoi	RD	86,521	49.38	Kushal Dowari	BJP	69,249	39.52	17,272	9.86
Sibsagar	97	Nazira	Mayur Borgohain	BJP	98,198	62.64	Debabrata Saikia	INC	51,497	32.85	46,701	29.79
Majuli	98	Majuli (ST)	Bhuban Gam	BJP	78,324	63.51	Indraneel Pegu	INC	43,024	34.89	35,300	28.62
Jorhat	99	Teok	Bikash Saikia	AGP	90,368	55.84	Pallabi Saikia Gogoi	INC	67,696	41.83	22,672	14.01
Jorhat	100	Jorhat	Hitendra Nath Goswami	BJP	69,439	58.70	Gaurav Gogoi	INC	46,257	39.10	23,182	19.60
Jorhat	101	Mariani	Rupjyoti Kurmi	BJP	79,632	58.45	Gyanashree Bora	RD	52,792	38.75	26,840	19.70
Jorhat	102	Titabor	Dhiraj Gowala	BJP	78,743	47.51	Pran Kurmi	INC	55,428	33.44	23,315	14.07
Golaghat	103	Golaghat	Ajanta Neog	BJP	1,02,212	61.88	Bitupan Saikia	INC	58,453	35.39	43,759	26.49
Golaghat	104	Dergaon	Mridul Kumar Dutta	BJP	90,049	60.59	Sagorika Bora	INC	53,096	35.72	36,953	24.87
Golaghat	105	Bokakhat	Atul Bora	AGP	80,987	59.66	Hari Prasad Saikia	RD	20,450	15.06	60,537	44.60
Golaghat	106	Khumtai	Mrinal Saikia	BJP	91,127	62.43	Roselina Tirkey	INC	32,715	22.41	58,412	40.02
Golaghat	107	Sarupathar	Biswajit Phukan	BJP	96,341	63.87	Jiban Chutia	AJP	40,261	26.69	56,080	37.18
Karbi Anglong	108	Bokajan (ST)	Surjya Rongphar	BJP	69,851	54.48	Raton Engti	INC	52,385	40.86	17,466	13.62
Karbi Anglong	109	Howraghat (ST)	Lunsing Teron	BJP	106,229	68.23	Sanjeeb Teron	INC	28,123	18.06	78,106	50.17
Karbi Anglong	110	Diphu (ST)	Niso Terangpi	BJP	90,866	62.95	J. I. Kathar	Ind	41,126	28.49	49,740	34.46
West Karbi Anglong	111	Rongkhang (ST)	Tuliram Ronghang	BJP	83,248	75.72	Augustine Enghee	INC	23,005	20.93	60,243	54.79
West Karbi Anglong	112	Amri (ST)	Habbey Teron	BJP	50,273	63.29	Bikram Hanse	Ind	26,363	33.19	23,910	30.20
Dima Hasao	113	Haflong (ST)	Rupali Langthasa	BJP	78,674	59.38	Daniel Langthasa	NPP	28,368	21.41	50,306	37.97
Cachar	114	Lakhipur	Kaushik Rai	BJP	1,25,302	81.49	M. Santi Kumar Singha	INC	25,901	16.84	99,401	64.65
Cachar	115	Udharbond	Rajdeep Goala	BJP	1,03,331	66.08	Ajit Singh	INC	47,867	30.61	55,464	35.47
Cachar	116	Katigorah	Kamalakhya Dey Purkayastha	BJP	110,758	58.21	Amar Chand Jain	INC	73,078	38.41	37,680	19.80
Cachar	117	Borkhola	Kishor Nath	BJP	1,02,775	58.02	Amit Kumar Kalwar	INC	66,162	37.35	36,613	20.67
Cachar	118	Silchar	Dr. Rajdeep Roy	BJP	110,758	64.09	Abhijit Paul	INC	56,761	32.85	53,997	31.24
Cachar	119	Sonai	Aminul Haque Laskar	INC	89,957	56.05	Karim Uddin Barbhuiya	AGP	62,787	39.12	27,170	16.93
Cachar	120	Dholai (SC)	Amiya Kanti Das	BJP	1,00,634	62.73	Dhrubajyoti Purkayastha	INC	56,172	35.02	44,462	27.71
Hailakandi	121	Hailakandi	Dr. Milon Das	BJP	119,591	63.57	Rahul Roy	INC	63,774	33.90	55,817	29.67
Hailakandi	122	Algapur–Katlicherra	Zubair Anam Mazumder	INC	145,661	64.16	Zakir Hussain Laskar	AGP	40,213	17.71	105,448	46.45
Sribhumi	123	Karimganj North	Jakaria Ahmed	INC	122,356	54.17	Subrata Bhattacharjee	BJP	96,353	42.66	26,003	11.51
Sribhumi	124	Karimganj South	Aminur Rashid Choudhury	INC	137,257	57.78	Ekbal Hussain	AGP	50,625	21.31	86,632	36.47
Sribhumi	125	Patharkandi	Krishnendu Paul	BJP	98,101	64.35	Kartik Sena Sinha	INC	51,337	33.67	46,764	30.68
Sribhumi	126	Ram Krishna Nagar (SC)	Bijoy Malakar	BJP	134,013	70.70	Suruchi Roy	INC	50,248	26.51	83,765	44.19

== See also ==
- 2025 Assam local elections
- 2024 Indian general election in Assam
