= Bhergaon Assembly constituency =

Assembly constituency of Assam

Bhergaon
- Constituency No. 45 for the Assam Legislative Assembly

Constituency details
- Country: India
- Region: Northeast India
- State: Assam
- District: Udalguri
- Lok Sabha constituency: Darrang–Udalguri
- Established: 2023
- Reservation: None

Member of Legislative Assembly
- 16th Assam Legislative Assembly
- Incumbent Maheswar Baro
- Party: BPF
- Alliance: NDA
- Elected year: 2026

Bhergaon Assembly constituency is one of the 126 assembly constituencies of Assam a north east state of India. It was newly formed in 2023.

== Election Results ==
=== 2026 ===
2026 Assam Legislative Assembly election: Bhergaon
Party	Candidate	Votes	%	±%
BPF	Maheswar Baro	67105	50.22	
UPPL	Anchula Gwara Daimary	29308	21.94	
JMM	Prabhat Das Panika	21997	16.46	
INC	Anchula Gwara Daimary	8267	6.19	
NOTA	NOTA	1921	1.44	
Margin of victory		37797		
Turnout		133609		
Rejected ballots				
Registered electors				
BPF win (new seat)				

== See also ==
- List of constituencies of Assam Legislative Assembly
