= Baksa Assembly constituency =

Assembly constituency of Assam

Baksa
- Constituency No. 42 for the Assam Legislative Assembly

Constituency details
- Country: India
- Region: Northeast India
- State: Assam
- District: Baksa
- Lok Sabha constituency: Kokrajhar
- Established: 2023
- Reservation: ST

Member of Legislative Assembly
- 16th Assam Legislative Assembly
- Incumbent Maneswar Brahma
- Party: BPF
- Alliance: NDA
- Elected year: 2026

Baksa Assembly constituency is one of the 126 assembly constituencies of Assam a north east state of India. It was newly formed in 2023.

== Election Results ==
=== 2026 ===
2026 Assam Legislative Assembly election: Baksa
Party	Candidate	Votes	%	±%
BPF	Maneswar Brahma	88,820	55.06	
UPPL	Rakesh Brahma	39770	24.65	
INC	Jagadish Madahi	10623	6.59	
NOTA	NOTA	2937	1.82	
Margin of victory		49050		
Turnout		161321		
Rejected ballots				
Registered electors				
BPF win (new seat)				

== See also ==
- Baksa district
- List of constituencies of Assam Legislative Assembly
