= Kokrajhar Lok Sabha constituency =

Lok Sabha constituency in Assam

Coordinates: 26.4°N 90.3°E

Kokrajhar AS-1
- Lok Sabha constituency
- Interactive Map Outlining Kokrajhar. Lok Sabha constituency

Constituency details
- Country: India
- Region: Northeast India
- State: Assam
- Established: 1952
- Reservation: ST

Member of Parliament
- 18th Lok Sabha
- Incumbent Joyanta Basumatary
- Party: UPPL
- Alliance: None
- Elected year: 2024

Kokrajhar Lok Sabha constituency is one of the 14 Lok Sabha constituencies in Assam state in north-eastern India. The seat is reserved for scheduled tribes.

== Assembly segments ==
Kokrajhar Lok Sabha constituency is composed of the following assembly segments:

=== Current assembly segments ===
Constituency number	Name	District	MLA	Party	2024 Lead
1	Gossaigaon	Kokrajhar	Sabharam Basumatary	BPF	UPPL
2	Dotma (ST)	Kokrajhar	Rabiram Narzary	BPF	UPPL
3	Kokrajhar (ST)	Kokrajhar	Sewli Mohilary	BPF	BPF
4	Baokhungri	Kokrajhar	Rupam Chandra Roy	BPF	UPPL
5	Parbatjhora	Kokrajhar	Md. Ashraful Islam Sheikh	INC	BPF
19	Sidli–Chirang (ST)	Chirang	Paniram Brahma	BPF	UPPL
20	Bijni	Chirang	Arup Kumar Dey	BJP	UPPL
41	Manas	Baksa	Thaneswar Basumatary	BPF	UPPL
42	Baksa (ST)	Baksa	Maneswar Brahma	BPF	UPPL

=== Previous assembly segments ===
Constituency number	Name	District
28	Gossaigaon	Kokrajhar
29	Kokrajhar West (ST)	Kokrajhar
30	Kokrajhar East (ST)	Kokrajhar
31	Sidli (ST)	Chirang
33	Bijni	Chirang
40	Sorbhog	Barpeta
41	Bhabanipur	Bajali
58	Tamulpur	Baksa
62	Barama (ST)	Baksa
63	Chapaguri (ST)	Baksa

== Members of Parliament ==
Year	Winner	Party
1957	D. Basumatari	Indian National Congress
1962	D. Basumatari	Indian National Congress
1967	D. Basumatari	Indian National Congress
1971	D. Basumatari	Indian National Congress
1977	Charan Narzary	Independent
1984	Samar Brahma Choudhury	Independent
1991	Satyendranath Brohmo Choudhury	Independent
1996	Louis Islary	Independent
1998	Sansuma Khunggur Bwiswmuthiary	Independent
1999	Sansuma Khunggur Bwiswmuthiary	Independent
2004	Sansuma Khunggur Bwiswmuthiary	Independent
2009	Sansuma Khunggur Bwiswmuthiary	Bodoland People's Front
2014	Naba Kumar Sarania	Independent
2019	Naba Kumar Sarania	Independent
2024	Joyanta Basumatary	United People's Party Liberal

== Election results ==
=== 2024 ===
2024 Indian general election: Kokrajhar
Party	Candidate	Votes	%	±%
UPPL	Joyanta Basumatary	488,995	39.39	▲18.27
BPF	Kampa Borgoyari	437,412	35.23	▲5.03
INC	Garjan Mushahary	113,736	9.16	▼0.78
GSP	Binita Deka	94,189	7.59	New
Independent	Prithviraj Narayandev Mech	33,737	2.72	N/A
AITC	Gauri Sankar Sarania	23,519	1.89	New
NOTA	None of the above	13,912	1.12	▲0.04
Majority		51,583	4.16	▲1.61
Turnout		1,254,499	83.95	▲0.65
UPPL gain from Independent		Swing		

=== 2019 ===
2019 Indian general election: Kokrajhar
Party	Candidate	Votes	%	±%
Independent	Naba Kumar Sarania	484,560	32.75	−19.07
BPF	Pramila Rani Brahma	446,774	30.20	+10.29
UPPL	Urkhao Gwra Brahma	312,435	21.12	
INC	Sabda Ram Rabha	147,118	9.94	
CPI(M)	Biraj Deka	28,128	1.90	
NOTA	None of the Above	15,988	1.08	N/A
Majority		37,786	2.55	
Turnout		1,479,744	83.30	
Independent hold		Swing		

=== 2014 ===
2014 Indian general election: Kokrajhar
Party	Candidate	Votes	%	±%
IND	Naba Kumar Sarania (Hira)	634,428	51.84	
IND	Urkhao Gwra Brahma	278,649	22.77	
BPF	Chandan Brahma	243,759	19.92	
IND	Sabda Ram Rabha	20,074	1.64	
AITC	Ranjit Shekhar Mooshahary	17,537	1.43	
IND	Sansuma Khunggur Bwiswmuthiary	11,239	0.92	
Majority		355,779	29.07	
Turnout		1,224,243	81.23	
Swing to Independent from BPF		Swing		

=== 2009 ===
2009 Indian general election: Kokrajhar
Party	Candidate	Votes	%	±%
BPF	S. K. Bwiswmuthiary	495,211	48.80	
IND	Urkhao Gwra Brahma	304,889	30.04	
AGP	Sabda Ram Rabha	214,684	21.16	
Majority		190,322	18.76	
Turnout		1,014,784	73.65	
Swing to BPF from Independent		Swing		

=== 2004 ===
2004 Indian general election: Kokrajhar
Party	Candidate	Votes	%	±%
IND	S. K. Bwiswmuthiary	689,620	71.32	
IND	Sabda Ram Rabha	205,491	21.25	
INC	Derhagra Mochahary	61,425	6.35	
IND	Rajendra Mushahary	10,451	1.08	
Majority		484,129	50.07	
Turnout				
Independent hold		Swing		

=== 1999 ===
1999 Indian general election: Kokrajhar
Party	Candidate	Votes	%	±%
IND	S. K. Bwiswmuthiary	334,367	37.57	
URMCA (Note: United Reservation Movement Council of Assam)	Theodore Kisku Rapaz	246,942	27.75	
PDF (Note: People's Democratic Front)	Gangadhar Ramchiary	172,434	19.37	
INC	Sri Premsing Brahma	65,234	7.33	
IND	Anil Murmu	63,427	7.13	
UBNLF (Note: United Bodo Nationalist Liberation Front)	Kanakeswar Narzary	7,611	0.86	
Majority		87,425	9.82	
Turnout		910,953	77.96	
Independent hold		Swing		

=== 1998 ===
1998 Indian general election: Kokrajhar
Party	Candidate	Votes	%	±%
IND	S. K. Bwiswmuthiary	192,975	25.55	
URMCA	Theodor Kisku Rapaz	151,543	20.07	
IND	Binod Gayary	140,457	18.60	
BJP	Charan Narzary	115,875	15.34	
INC	Premsing Brahma	89,470	11.85	
AGP	Louis Islary	47,853	6.34	
PTCA (Note: Plains Tribals Council of Assam)	Thaneswar Boro	12,952	1.72	
IND	Jamini Mohan Basumatary	4,041	0.54	
Majority		41,432	5.48	
Turnout		786,072	67.20	
Independent hold		Swing		

=== 1996 ===
1996 Indian general election: Kokrajhar
Party	Candidate	Votes	%	±%
IND	Louis Islary	185,688	24.36	
IND	Rabi Ram Brahma	154,134	20.22	
AGP	Pani Ram Rava	153,540	20.15	
INC	Lahendra Basumatary	129,037	16.93	
BJP	Charan Narzary	122,609	16.09	
IC(S)	Amrit Lal Basumatary	17,160	2.25	
Majority		31,554	4.14	
Turnout		807,919	82.62	
Independent hold		Swing		

=== 1991 ===
1991 Indian general election: Kokrajhar
Party	Candidate	Votes	%	±%
IND	S. N. Brohmo Chaudhury	426,727	53.20	
INC	Louis Islary	163,588	20.39	
AGP	Birendra Chandra Boro	140,809	17.55	
PTCA	Samar Brahma Choudhury	71,027	8.85	
Majority		263,139	32.81	
Turnout		834,868	84.55	
Independent hold		Swing		

=== 1984 ===
1984 Indian general election: Kokrajhar
Party	Candidate	Votes	%	±%
PTCA	Samar Brahma Choudhury	184,508	30.03	
IND	Prasenjit Brahma	170,744	27.79	
INC	Uttam Brahma	109,618	17.84	
IND	Derharga Mochahary	87,524	14.25	
IC(S)	Monkeswar Basumatary	61,969	10.09	
Majority		13,764	2.24	
Turnout		644,220	87.77	

== See also ==
- Kokrajhar district
- List of constituencies of the Lok Sabha
