= Manas Assembly constituency =

Assembly constituency of Assam

Manas
- Constituency No. 41 for the Assam Legislative Assembly

Constituency details
- Country: India
- Region: Northeast India
- State: Assam
- District: Baksa
- Lok Sabha constituency: Kokrajhar
- Established: 2023
- Reservation: None

Member of Legislative Assembly
- 16th Assam Legislative Assembly
- Incumbent Thaneswar Basumatary
- Party: BPF
- Alliance: NDA
- Elected year: 2026

Manas Assembly constituency is one of the 126 assembly constituencies of Assam a north east state of India. It was newly formed in 2023.

== Election Results ==
=== 2026 ===
2026 Assam Legislative Assembly election: Manas
Party	Candidate	Votes	%	±%
BPF	Thaneswar Basumatary	90060	50.95	
RD	Anjan Talukdar	42650	24.13	
UPPL	Jwngsrang Brahma	27674	15.66	
GSP	Pintu Ghosh	1591	0.39	
BGP	Naba Sarania	690	0.9	
Independent	Lakshan Goyari	1461	0.83	
Independent	Khandakar Abdul Kaddus	1186	0.67	
Independent	Nikunja Das	1855	0.83	
NOTA	NOTA	2034	1.15	
Margin of victory		47410		
Turnout		176761		
Rejected ballots				
Registered electors				
BPF win (new seat)				

== See also ==
- List of constituencies of Assam Legislative Assembly
