= Darrang–Udalguri Lok Sabha constituency =

Lok Sabha constituency in Assam

Coordinates: 26.61°N 92.10°E

Darrang–Udalguri AS-4
- Lok Sabha constituency
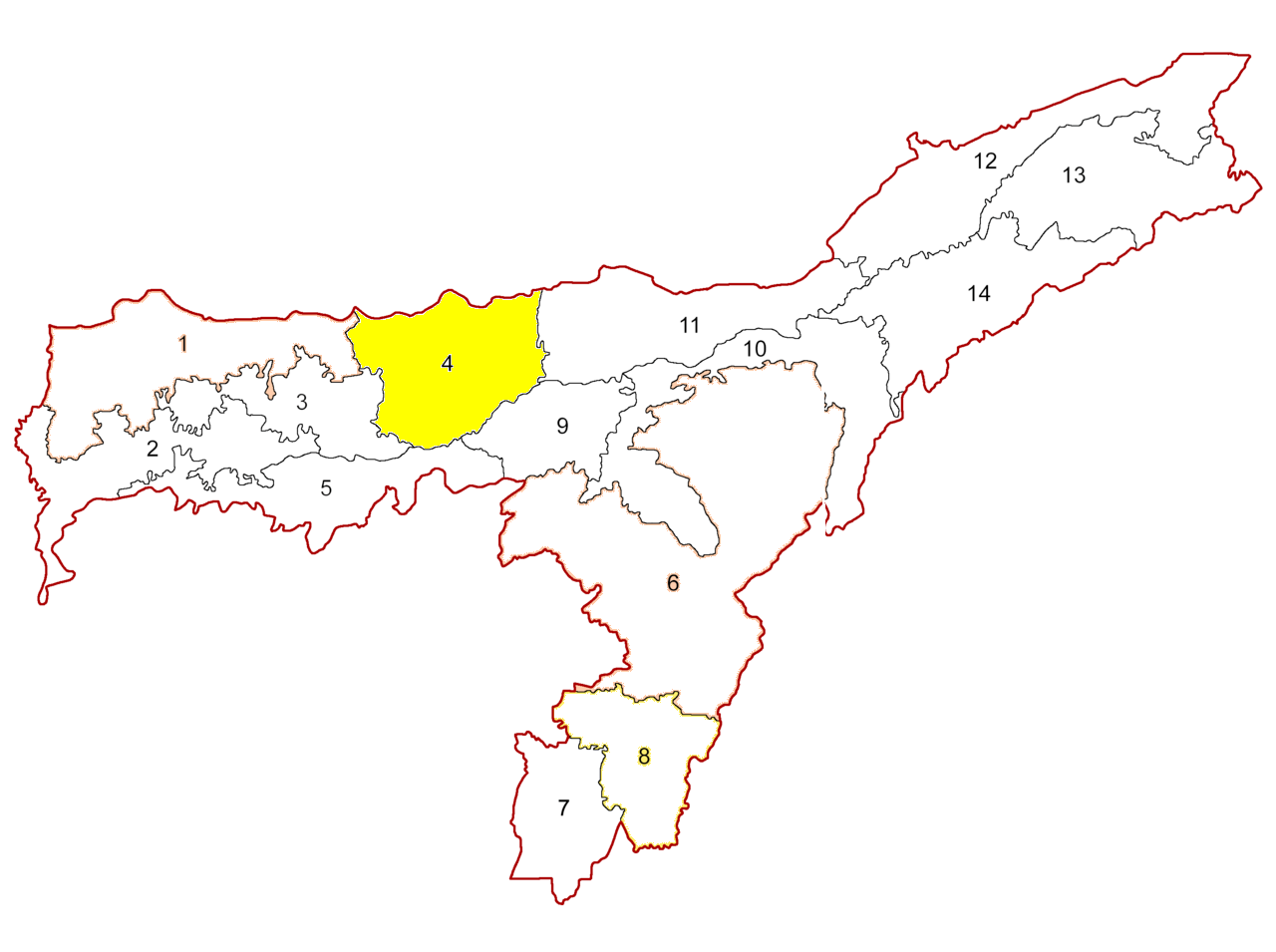
- Darrang–Udalguri Lok Sabha constituency within the state of Assam

Constituency details
- Country: India
- Region: Northeast India
- State: Assam
- Assembly constituencies: 11
- Established: 2023
- Reservation: None

Member of Parliament
- 18th Lok Sabha
- Incumbent Dilip Saikia
- Party: BJP
- Alliance: NDA
- Elected year: 2024

Darrang–Udalguri Lok Sabha constituency (erstwhile Mangaldoi) is one of the 14 Lok Sabha constituencies in Assam state in north-eastern India.

The Election Commission on 2023 August 11th published its final order on the delimitation of parliamentary and Assembly constituencies in Assam.

== Assembly segments ==
Darang–Udalguri Lok Sabha constituency is composed of the following assembly segments:

No.	Name	District	Member	Party	2024 Lead
31	Rangiya	Kamrup	Bhabesh Kalita	BJP	BJP
32	Kamalpur	Kamrup	Diganta Kalita	BJP	BJP
43	Tamulpur (ST)	Tamulpur	Biswajit Daimary	BJP	BJP
44	Goreshwar	Tamulpur	Victor Kumar Das	BJP	BJP
45	Bhergaon	Udalguri	Maheswar Baro	BPF	BJP
46	Udalguri (ST)	Udalguri	Rihon Daimary	BPF	BPF
47	Majbat	Udalguri	Charan Boro	BPF	BJP
48	Tangla	Udalguri	Bikan Chandra Deka	BJP	BJP
49	Sipajhar	Darrang	Paramananda Rajbongshi	BJP	BJP
50	Mangaldai	Darrang	Nilima Devi	BJP	BJP
51	Dalgaon	Darrang	Mazibur Rahman	AIUDF	INC

== Members of Parliament ==
Election	Name	Party	Ref
2024	Dilip Saikia	Bharatiya Janata Party	

== Election results ==
=== 2024 ===
2024 Indian general election: Darrang-Udalguri
Party	Candidate	Votes	%	±%
BJP	Dilip Saikia	868,387	47.95	
INC	Madhab Rajbangshi	5,39,375	29.78	
BPF	Durga Das Boro	3,10,574	17.15	
NOTA	None of the above	23,204	1.28	
Majority		3,29,012	18.17	
Turnout		18,20,644	82.21	
BJP win (new seat)				

== See also ==
- List of constituencies of the Lok Sabha
