= Md. Ashraful Islam Sheikh =

Indian politician (born 1992)

Member of the Assam Legislative Assembly
- Constituency: Parbatjhora Assembly constituency

Personal details
- Born: 1992 (age 33–34)
- Party: Indian National Congress
- Education: P.B. College, Gauripur (BA), Dhubri Law College (LLB), Gauhati University (MA)
- Occupation: Advocate

Md. Ashraful Islam Sheikh (born 1992) is an Indian politician from the northeastern state of Assam. He was a member of the Assam Legislative Assembly from Parbatjhora Assembly constituency in Kokrajhar district representing the Indian National Congress.

== Early life and education ==
Sheikh is from Parbatjhora, Kokrajhar district, Assam. He is the son of Abdul Mannan Sheikh. He completed his BA at P.B. College, Gauripur, Dhubri, Assam in 2013 and did his LLB at Dhubri Law College Dhubri, Assam in 2016. Later, he completed MA at Gauhati University in 2018. He is an advocate and his wife is a school teacher. He declared assets worth Rs.48 lakhs in his affidavit to the Election Commission of India.

== Career ==
Sheikh won the Parbatjhora Assembly constituency representing the Indian National Congress in the 2026 Assam Legislative Assembly election. He polled 77,128 votes and defeated his nearest rival, Rezaul Karim of the Bodoland People's Front, by a margin of 9,022 votes.
