= Chamaria Assembly constituency =

Chamaria
- Constituency No. 27 for the Assam Legislative Assembly

Constituency details
- Country: India
- Region: Northeast India
- State: Assam
- District: Kamrup
- Lok Sabha constituency: Guwahati
- Established: 2023
- Reservation: None

Member of Legislative Assembly
- 16th Assam Legislative Assembly
- Incumbent Rekibuddin Ahmed
- Party: Indian National Congress
- Alliance: Asom Sonmilito Morcha
- Elected year: 2026

Chamaria Assembly constituency is one of the 126 Assembly constituencies in Kamrup district in the North-East Indian state of Assam. It was newly formed in 2023.

== Election Results ==
=== 2026 ===
2026 Assam Legislative Assembly election: Chamaria
Party	Candidate	Votes	%	±%
INC	Rekibuddin Ahmed	149,720	63.83	
AIUDF	Imdad Hussain	71,024	30.28	
AGP	Nurul Islam	9,570	4.08	
NOTA	NOTA	1,336	0.57	
Margin of victory		78,696	33.55	
Turnout		234,572	94.53	
Rejected ballots				
Registered electors				
INC win (new seat)				

== See also ==
- Kamrup District
- List of constituencies of Assam Legislative Assembly
