= Jakaria Ahmed =

Indian politician (born 1985)

Jakaria Ahmed (Bengali: জাকারিয়া আহমেদ, Bengali pronunciation: [dʒakaɾija aɦmed]; born 1985) is an Indian politician from the northeastern state of Assam. He was a member of the Assam Legislative Assembly from Karimganj North Assembly constituency in Sribhumi district representing the Indian National Congress.

Ahmed is from Karimganj, Assam. He is the son of the late MLA Jamal Uddin Ahmed. , General Secretary, Badarpur Block Congress Committee, 2014-2016 Secretary, District Congress Committee, 2016-2017.General Secretary, District Congress Committee, 2017-2022.President Badarpur Block Congress Committee, 2022-2025.

He is a businessman and he declared assets worth Rs.12 crore in his affidavit to the Election Commission of India.

== Career ==
Ahmed won the Karimganj North Assembly constituency representing the Indian National Congress in the 2026 Assam Legislative Assembly election. He polled 1,22,356 votes and defeated his nearest rival, Subrata Bhattacharjee of the Bharatiya Janata Party, by a margin of 26,003 votes.
