= Assam Jatiya Parishad =

- Abbreviation: AJP
- President: Lurinjyoti Gogoi
- Secretary: Jagadish Bhuyan
- Founded: 2020
- Headquarters: H.No. 33, 1st Floor, Lamb Road, Guwahati - 781001
- Ideology: Assamese nationalism Regionalism; Anti-CAA
- Alliance: ASOM (2023–present); INDIA (2023–present)
- Seats in Rajya Sabha: 0 / 245
- Seats in Lok Sabha: 0 / 543
- Seats in Assam Legislative Assembly: 0 / 126
- Seats in Guwahati Corporation: 0 / 60

Election symbol
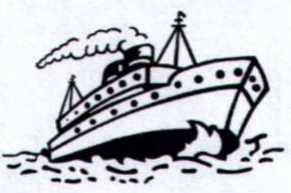

Party flag
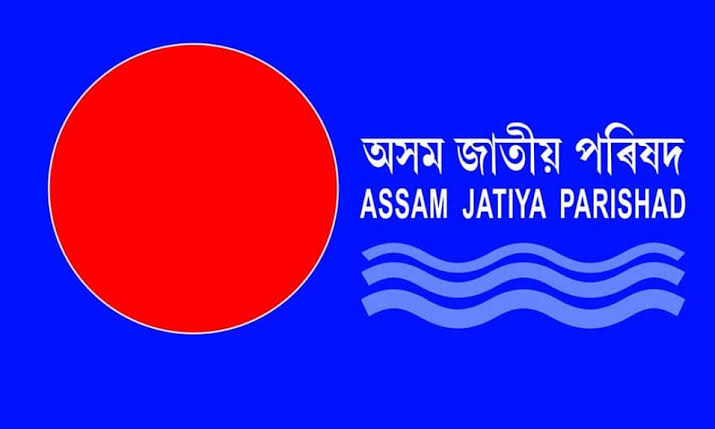

Website
- assamjatiyaparishad.org

Assam Jatiya Parishad (AJP) is a state political party in Assam, India. It was formed with the merger of two student organizations of Assam, All Assam Students Union (AASU) and Asom Jatiyatabadi Yuba Chatra Parishad (AJYCP) in September 2020. Former AASU General Secretary, Lurinjyoti Gogoi is the first president of Assam Jatiya Parishad. Its party symbol is 'Ship', as allotted by Election Commission of India. The Party has many wings like Jatiya Yuva Shakti, the Youth Wing of AJP, Jatia Mahila Shakti, Jatiya Chah Shakti, Jatiya Krishak Shakti, Jatia Hoinkhyaloghu Shakti, Jatia Bhakhik-Honkhyalogu Shakti, Jatiya Shram Shakti.

== Electoral performance ==
For the 2021 Assam Legislative Assembly election, AJP joined an alliance with Raijor Dal, an offshoot of Krishak Mukti Sangram Samiti. According to the seat-sharing agreement, AJP candidates would contest 82 seats of Assam, and Raijor Dal on 29 seats.

The AJP contested in the 2026 Assam Legislative Assembly election under the Indian National Congress led Asom Sonmilito Morcha, where it was allocated 10 seats. However, the party again failed to win any seat.

=== State Legislative Assembly Elections ===
Election Year	Seats contested	Seats won	Change in seats	Votes	Percentage of votes	Vote swing
Assam Legislative Assembly
2021	82	0	Steady		3.66%	+3.66%
2026	10	0	Steady		2.52%	-1.14%
Lok Sabha
2024	1	0	Steady	414,441
