= Bikan Chandra Deka =

Indian politician (born 1964)

Bikan Chandra Deka (born 1964) is an Indian politician from the northeastern state of Assam. He is a member of the Assam Legislative Assembly from the Tangla Assembly constituency in Udalguri district representing the Bharatiya Janata Party.

== Early life and education ==
Deka is from Tangla, Udalguri district, Assam. He is the son of the late Gobinda Deka. He completed his BE in agriculture at Rajasthan Agriculture University, Bikaner, in 1988. He served as a Senior Manager of Bhootiachang Tea Estate, Williamson Magor and Company limited and now does his own farming. His wife is a cultivator. He declared assets worth Rs.40 lakhs in 2016 and Rs.1 crore in 2026., in his affidavits to the Election Commission of India.

== Career ==
Deka won the Tangla Assembly constituency representing the Bharatiya Janata Party in the 2026 Assam Legislative Assembly election. He polled 84,309 votes and defeated his nearest rival, Rohit Pariga of the Indian National Congress, by a margin of 54,601 votes. In 2016, he contested as an independent candidate in the 2024 Indian general election in Assam and lost the Darrang–Udalguri Lok Sabha constituency.
