= Emmanuel Mosahary =

Indian politician

Emmanuel Mosahary is a Bodoland People's Front politician from Assam. He was elected to the Assam Legislative Assembly in the 2016 election from Tamulpur constituency.
