= Tangla Assembly constituency =

Assembly constituency of Assam

Tangla
- Constituency No. 48 for the Assam Legislative Assembly

Constituency details
- Country: India
- Region: Northeast India
- State: Assam
- District: Udalguri
- Lok Sabha constituency: Darrang–Udalguri
- Established: 2023
- Reservation: None

Tangla Assembly constituency is one of the 126 assembly constituencies of Assam a north east state of India. It was newly formed in 2023. Tangla has 4 wards and is under Assam State.

== Election Results ==
=== 2026 ===
2026 Assam Legislative Assembly election: Tangla
Party	Candidate	Votes	%	±%
BJP	Bikan Chandra Deka	84,309	54.82%	
INC	Rohit Pariga	29708	19.32	
UPPL	JAYANTA KUMAR RABHA	28357	18.44	
NOTA	NOTA	2603	1.69	
Margin of victory		54,601	35.50%	
Turnout		153803		
Rejected ballots				
Registered electors				
BJP win (new seat)				

== See also ==
- List of constituencies of Assam Legislative Assembly
