= Manab Deka =

Indian politician

Member of Assam Legislative Assembly
- Constituency: 111 Lakimpur

Personal details
- Born: 20 October 1976 (age 49) North Lakhimpur, India
- Party: Bharatiya Janata Party
- Spouse: Raajashree Saikia Deka
- Children: 2
- Education: North Lakhimpur College

Manab Deka (born 20 October 1976) is an Indian politician from Assam. He is a two time member of the Assam Legislative Assembly for the Bharatiya Janata Party (BJP), from Lakhimpur constituency in 2021 and 2026.

== Early life and education ==
Deka is from Lakhimpur, Lakhimpur district, Assam. He is the son of the late Gobinda Mohan Deka. He married Raajashree Saikia Deka. He completed BA at Lakhimpur Telahi Kamalaboria College in 1998. He declared assets worth Rs.13 crore in his affidavit to the Election Commission of India.

== Career ==
Deka became an MLA for the first time winning the Lakhimpur Assembly constituency in the 2021 Assam Legislative Assembly election. He polled 70,387 votes and defeated Dr. Joy Prakash Das from Indian National Congress who got 67,351 votes. The victory margin was 3,036. He retained the seat for the BJP winning the 2026 Assam Legislative Assembly election. In 2026, he polled 88,726 votes and defeated his nearest opponent and former MLA, Ghana Buragohain of the Indian National Congress, by a margin of 33,220 votes.
