= Raijor Dal =

Political party in India

- President: Akhil Gogoi
- Founder: Akhil Gogoi
- Founded: 2 October 2020 (6 years ago)
- Headquarters: House No. 1, Near Modern High School, Mathgharia, Guwahati – 781020
- Ideology: Federalism; Regionalism; Anti-CAA; Secularism; Socialism; Progressivism
- Colours: Yellow; Red
- Alliance: ASOM (2023–2026); INDIA (2023–2026)
- Seats in Rajya Sabha: 0 / 245
- Seats in Lok Sabha: 0 / 543
- Seats in Assam Legislative Assembly: 2 / 126

Election symbol
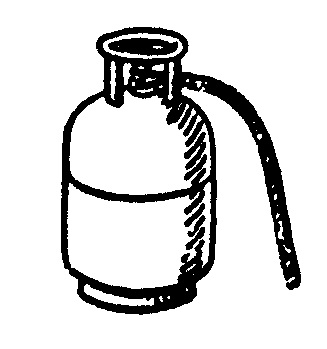

Party flag

Website
- www.raijordal.org

The Raijor Dal (transl. People's Party; abbr. RD) is an Indian political party based in the state of Assam. The party believes in the principles of secularism, socialism, federalism, progressivism, and opposes the Citizenship (Amendment) Act, 2019.

The formation of the party was the culmination of more than 15 years of struggle of its parent mass organization, Krishak Mukti Sangram Samiti (KMSS), for land rights, farmers rights, ecological conservation and protection of lives and livelihoods of the working classes of Assam. In the wake of the statewide Anti-CAA movement where KMSS and 70 other organizations played a leading role, Akhil Gogoi, then Chief advisor of KMSS and many others were arrested under laws like UAPA. The party was launched on 2 October 2020.

== History ==
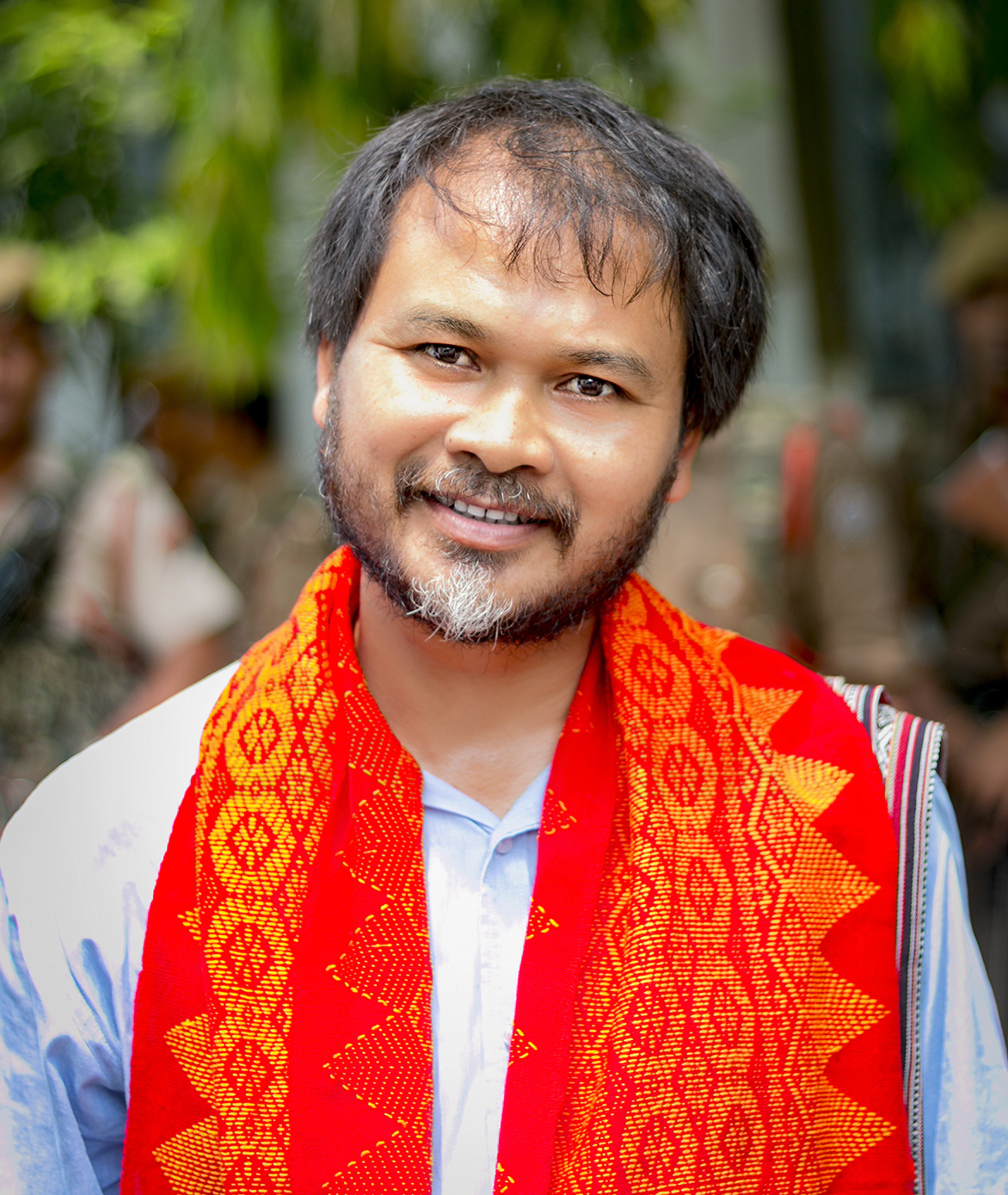
Party President, Mr. Akhil Gogoi.

The party was founded on 2 October 2021 by KMSS leader Akhil Gogoi, who at the time was in jail for his participation in the Citizenship Amendment Act protests.

The party was officially announced by filmmaker Jahnu Baruah who had extended his support along with Assamese film actress Zerifa Wahid and lawyer Arup Borbora.

The party is preparing pitch in the upcoming 2021 Assam Legislative Assembly election by intensifying anti-CAA protest apart from mounting pressure on the government to ensure release of Akhil Gogoi.

== Organization ==
=== National Executive ===
No.	Posts	Name	Tenure	Reference
1	President	Akhil Gogoi	?-?-2020-Incumbent	
2	Chief-Advisor		?-?-2020-Incumbent	
1	General Secretary		?-?-2020- Incumbent	

=== District Committees ===
S.No.	Districts	President	Secretary	In-Charge
1	Nagaon			
2	Cachar			
3	Kamrup Rural			
4	Dhubri			
5	Barpeta			
6	Golaghat			
7	Karimganj			
8	Dibrugarh			
9	Jorhat			
10	Tinsukia			
11	Morigaon			
12	Sonitpur			
13	Sivasagar			
14	Lakhimpur			
15	Goalpara			
16	Biswanath			
17	Nalbari	Ekram ali	Kamal ali	
18				
19				
20				
21				
22				
23				
24				

== Electoral performance ==
For 2021 Assam Legislative Assembly election, Raijor Dal joined an alliance with Assam Jatiya Parishad an offshoot of All Assam Students Union and Asom Jatiyatabadi Yuba Chatra Parishad. According to the seat-sharing agreement, Assam Jatiya Parishad will contest on 68 seats, and Raijor Dal will contest on 29 seats of Assam.

In the 2026 Assam Legislative Assembly election, the party won 2 seats.

=== State Legislative Assembly Elections ===
Vote share in consecutive Assam Legislative Assembly elections
2021	0.00%

Assam Legislative Assembly Elections
Election Year	Party leader	Seats contested	Seats won	Change in seats	Percentage of votes	Vote swing	Popular vote	Result
2021 Election	Akhil Gogoi	29	1	+1	TBD	TBD	TBD	Opposition
2026 Election	Akhil Gogoi	13	2	+1	2.68%	TBD	581,574	Opposition

== Members of Legislative Assembly ==
Members of Assam Legislative Assembly
Year	Sr. no.	Portrait	Name	Constituency	Votes Received	Margin
2021 Assam Legislative Assembly election	1.		Akhil Gogoi	Sibsagar	57,219	11,875
2026 Assam Legislative Assembly election	1.		Akhil Gogoi	Sibsagar	86,521	17,272
2026 Assam Legislative Assembly election	2.		Mehboob Muktar	Dhing	131,182	71,494

== Runner up Candidates ==
Runner-up Candidates of Raijor Dal
Year	Sr. no.	Name	Constituency	Votes Received	Margin of Defeat	Alliance
2021 Assam Legislative Assembly election	1.	Azizur Rahman	Naoboicha	49,292	3,613	United Regional Front with Assam Jatiya Parishad & Autonomous State Demand Committee
2021 By-election	2.	Dhaijya Konwar	Thowra	24,395	30,561	None
2026 Assam Legislative Assembly election	1.	Alok Nath	Tezpur	59,190	19,950	Asom Sonmilito Morcha
2026 Assam Legislative Assembly election	2.	Dr. Gyanashree Bora	Mariani	52,792	26,840	Asom Sonmilito Morcha
2026 Assam Legislative Assembly election	3.	Dulal Chandra Boruah	Sissiborgaon	35,165	40,593	Asom Sonmilito Morcha
2026 Assam Legislative Assembly election	4.	Anjan Talukdar	Manas	42,650	47,410	Asom Sonmilito Morcha
2026 Assam Legislative Assembly election	5.	Rahul Chetry	Margherita	31,032	55,317	Asom Sonmilito Morcha
2026 Assam Legislative Assembly election	6.	Dulal Moran	Digboi	24,617	41,073	Asom Sonmilito Morcha
2026 Assam Legislative Assembly election	7.	Hari Prasad Saikia	Bokakhat	20,450	60,537	Asom Sonmilito Morcha

== See also ==
- List of political parties in India
