= Parbatjhora Assembly constituency =

Assembly constituency of Assam

Parbatjhora
- Constituency No. 5 for the Assam Legislative Assembly

Constituency details
- Country: India
- Region: Northeast India
- State: Assam
- Division: Lower Assam
- District: Kokrajhar
- Lok Sabha constituency: Kokrajhar
- Established: 2023
- Reservation: None

Parbatjhora Assembly constituency is one of the 126 assembly constituencies of Assam a north east state of India. It was newly formed in 2023.

== Election Results ==
=== 2026 ===
2026 Assam Legislative Assembly election: Parbatjhora
Party	Candidate	Votes	%	±%
INC	Md Ashraful Islam Sheikh	77,128	46.95	New Seat
BPF	Rezaul Karim	68,106	41.46	New Seat
UPPL	Ayub Hussain Mondal	8,920	5.43	New Seat
AIUDF	Abu Taher Bepari	5,641	3.43	New Seat
NOTA	NOTA	1,373	0.84	New Seat
Majority		9,022	5.49	New Seat
Turnout		164,277		New Seat
Registered electors				
INC win (new seat)				

== See also ==
- List of constituencies of Assam Legislative Assembly
