= Makum Assembly constituency =

Assembly constituency of Assam

Makum
- Constituency No. 85 for the Assam Legislative Assembly

Constituency details
- Country: India
- Region: Northeast India
- State: Assam
- District: Tinsukia
- Lok Sabha constituency: Dibrugarh
- Established: 2023
- Reservation: None

Makum Assembly constituency is one of the 126 assembly constituencies of Assam a north east state of India. It was newly formed in 2023.

== Election Results ==
=== 2026 ===
2026 Assam Legislative Assembly election: Makum
Party	Candidate	Votes	%	±%
BJP	Sanjoy Kishan	74694	57.62	
INC	Sibanath Chetia	46418	35.81	
NOTA	NOTA	3047	2.35	
Margin of victory		28276		
Turnout		129621		
Rejected ballots				
Registered electors				
gain from		Swing		

== See also ==
- List of constituencies of Assam Legislative Assembly
