= Lakhimpur, Assam Assembly constituency =

Constituency of the Assam legislative assembly in India

Lakhimpur
- Constituency No. 76 for the Assam Legislative Assembly

Constituency details
- Country: India
- Region: Northeast India
- State: Assam
- District: Lakhimpur
- Lok Sabha constituency: Lakhimpur
- Established: 1972
- Reservation: None

Lakhimpur Assembly constituency is one of the 126 assembly constituencies of Assam a north east state of India. Lakhimpur is also part of Lakhimpur Lok Sabha constituency.

== Members of Legislative Assembly ==
Election	Member	Party affiliation
1972	Shubhankar Singha	Indian National Congress
1978	Sulo Bora	Communist Party of India
1983	Lekhan Lahan	Indian National Congress
1985	Utpal Dutta	Independent
1991	Indra Gogoi	Indian National Congress
1996	Utpal Dutta	Asom Gana Parishad
2001	Utpal Dutta	Asom Gana Parishad
2006	Ghana Buragohain	Indian National Congress
2011	Utpal Dutta	Asom Gana Parishad
2016	Utpal Dutta	Asom Gana Parishad
2021	Manab Deka	Bharatiya Janata Party

== Election Results ==
=== 2026 ===
2026 Assam Legislative Assembly election: Lakhimpur
Party	Candidate	Votes	%	±%
BJP	Manab Deka	85726	60	
INC	Ghana Buragohain	53506	37.45	
NOTA	NOTA	1533	1.07	
Margin of victory		32220		
Turnout		142885		
Rejected ballots				
Registered electors				
BJP hold		Swing		

=== 2021 ===
2021 Assam Legislative Assembly election: Lakhimpur
Party	Candidate	Votes	%	±%
BJP	Manab Deka	70,387	45.03	N/A
INC	Joy Prakash Das	67,351	43.09	+12.27
AGP	Utpal Dutta	12,486	7.99	−25.89
AJP	Ranjan Borpatra Gohain	2,453	1.57	N/A
NOTA	None of the above	1,114	0.71	+0.05
Majority		3,036	1.94	
Turnout		1,56,298	82.24	−2.36
BJP gain from AGP		Swing		

=== 2016 ===
2016 Assam Legislative Assembly election: Lakhimpur
Party	Candidate	Votes	%	±%
AGP	Utpal Dutta	45,917	33.88	
INC	Joy Prakash Das	41,762	30.82	
Independent	Ghana Buragohain	23,493	17.34	
Independent	Mahim Hazarika	11,272	8.32	
Independent	Uday Shankar Hazarika	4,750	3.51	
AIUDF	Dipak Chetia	1,313	0.97	
CPI	Arup Kalita	1,313	0.97	
NOTA	None of the above	888	0.66	
Majority		4,155	3.06	
Turnout		1,35,518	84.60	
AGP hold		Swing		

=== 2011 ===
2011 Assam Legislative Assembly election: Lakhimpur
Party	Candidate	Votes	%	±%
AGP	Utpal Dutta	52,563	47.5	
INC	Ghana Buragohain	51,464	46.5	
BJP	Banti Bonia	2,040	1.8	
AIUDF	Dilwar Hussain	1,707	1.5	
CPI	Arup Kalita	1,392	1.3	
AITC	Bulu Gogoi	1,076	1.0	
SUCI(C)	Birinchi Pegu	502	0.5	
Majority		1,099	1.0	
Turnout		1,10,744	78.3	
AGP gain from INC		Swing		

=== 2006 ===
2006 Assam Legislative Assembly election: Lakhimpur
Party	Candidate	Votes	%	±%
INC	Ghana Buragohain	40,411	36.8	
AGP(P)	Utpal Dutta	35,962	32.7	
AGP	Phanidhar Baruah	23,676	21.6	
BJP	Khagen Gogoi	4,827	4.4	
AUDF	Haidor Hussain Bora	2,411	2.2	
Independent	Birinchi Pegu	1,376	1.3	
LJP	Bhabit Saikia	1,186	1.1	
Majority		4,449	4.1	
Turnout		1,09,849	79.2	
INC gain from AGP		Swing		

=== 2001 ===
2001 Assam Legislative Assembly election: Lakhimpur
Party	Candidate	Votes	%	±%
AGP	Utpal Dutta	39,936	46.6	
INC	Indra Gogoi	39,252	45.8	
Independent	Jagnaswar Saikia	3,225	3.8	
NCP	Padma Taid	2,111	2.5	
LJP	Sunmoni Das	742	0.9	
UMFA	Abul Kashem Bhuyan	275	0.3	
Independent	Uttam Kalita	168	0.2	
Majority		684	0.8	
Turnout		87,146	76.2	
AGP hold		Swing		

=== 1996 ===
1996 Assam Legislative Assembly election: Lakhimpur
Party	Candidate	Votes	%	±%
AGP	Utpal Dutta	32,300	44.7	
INC	Makhan Chetia	17,284	23.9	
Independent	Jogen Milli	7,991	11.1	
Independent	Bisheswar Bora	6,602	9.1	
BJP	Jugal Kr. Dutta	4,412	6.1	
AIIC(T)	Rajen Dutta	1,497	2.1	
JD	Tarun Saikia	740	1.0	
Independent	Khudiram Hazarika	686	1.0	
Independent	Muslim Ali	488	0.7	
Independent	Jitul Konwar	164	0.2	
Independent	Arup Kalita	135	0.2	
Majority		15,016	20.8	
Turnout		75,881	77.3	
AGP gain from INC		Swing		

=== 1991 ===
1991 Assam Legislative Assembly election: Lakhimpur
Party	Candidate	Votes	%	±%
INC	Indra Gogoi	19,737	32.6	
AGP	Utpal Dutta	14,889	24.6	
CPI	Rohini Goswami	4,167	6.9	
Independent	Kamal Gogoi	3,512	5.8	
JD	Mukta Nath Bharali	2,459	4.1	
Independent	Nomal Bhuyan	2,346	3.9	
NAGP	Bijoy Deori	2,104	3.5	
Independent	Motilal Doley	1,859	3.1	
Independent	Jagot Gogoi	1,711	2.8	
Independent	Sarat Kumar Chelleng	1,605	2.7	
Independent	Pradip Tanti	1,314	2.2	
Independent	Gobin Chandra Bora	905	1.5	
Independent	Puneswar Pegu	803	1.4	
Independent	Dhebar Gohain Boruah	744	1.2	
BJP	Roma Dutta	658	1.1	
Majority		4,848	7.5	
Turnout		64,905	72.8	
INC gain from AGP		Swing		

=== 1985 ===
1985 Assam Legislative Assembly election: Lakhimpur
Party	Candidate	Votes	%	±%
Independent	Utpal Dutta	29,471	58.4	
INC	Lekhan Lahan	11,795	23.4	
Independent	Sirajul Islam Hazarika	1,216	2.4	
Independent	Jatin Taid	1,179	2.3	
LKD	Dilip Morang	1,135	2,3	
CPI	Sula Bora	1,074	2.1	
JP	Sarat Kumar Chelleng	1,015	2.0	
Majority		17,676	32.9	
Turnout		53,781	74.7	
Independent gain from INC		Swing		
