= Binod Hazarika =

Indian politician

Binod Hazarika is a Bharatiya Janata Party politician from Assam, India. He was elected in 2016 Assam Legislative Assembly election from Chabua.

In protests against the Citizenship (Amendment) Act, 2019 in December 2019 a group of demonstrators set fire to his house in Chabua.

In May 2021 he was elected as MLA for Lahowal.
