= Chakradhar Gogoi =

Indian politician

Assam Legislative Assembly
- Incumbent
- Assumed office 2016 Incumbent
- Constituency: Khowang Assembly constituency

Chakradhar Gogoi is a Bharatiya Janata Party politician from Assam. He has been elected in Assam Legislative Assembly elections in 2016/2021 and 2026 from Khowang Assembly constituency.
