= Rama Kanta Dewri =

Indian politician

Rama Kanta Dewri is a Bharatiya Janata Party politician from the Indian state of Assam. He has been elected in Assam Legislative Assembly election in 2016 from the Morigaon Assembly constituency.

== Accusations ==
On 18 February 2017, a sex tape allegedly featuring Dewri went viral in the Marigaon constituency. Dewri denied involvement in the video and said he would resign if forensic tests showed his involvement.

According to Morigaon district Superintendent of Police Swapnail Deka, a criminal case has been filed by Dewri against the editors of three local television channels that broadcast the video. He also stated that four compact discs containing the video were distributed to four local TV channels, with three of them airing the footage.
