= Nurul Huda (Assamese politician) =

Indian politician

Nurul Huda (born 24 January 1965) is an Indian politician from Assam. He has been a Member of the Assam Legislative Assembly from the Rupohihat Assembly constituency since 2016. He is associated with the Indian National Congress.
