= Maheswar Baro =

Indian politician

Maheswar Baro is a Bodoland People's Front politician from Assam. He was elected to the Assam Legislative Assembly from Kalaigaon constituency in the 2016 election.
