= Maneswar Brahma =

Indian politician

Member of the Assam Legislative Assembly for Barama
- Incumbent
- Assumed office 2016
- Preceded by: Paniram Rabha

Personal details
- Party: Bodoland People's Front

Maneswar Brahma is a Bodoland People's Front politician from Assam, India. He has been elected in Assam Legislative Assembly election in 2016 from Barama constituency.
