= Bodoland People's Front =

Political party in Assam, India

- Abbreviation: BPF
- Chairperson: Hagrama Mohilary
- Founded: 5 December 2005 (20 years ago)
- Headquarters: Kokrajhar, Assam
- Ideology: Secularism; Democratic socialism
- ECI status: State Party
- Alliance: NDA (2016–2021, 2022–2023, 2024–present); UPA (2011–2016, 2021)
- Seats in Rajya Sabha: 0 / 245
- Seats in Lok Sabha: 0 / 543
- Seats in Assam Legislative Assembly: 10 / 126
- Seats in Bodoland Territorial Council: 28 / 40

Election symbol
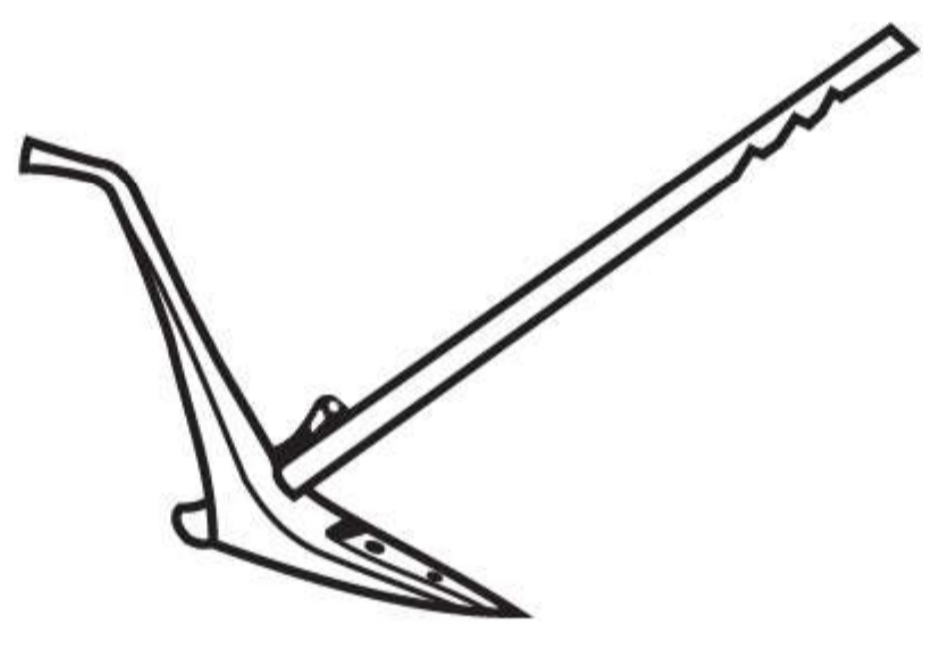

Party flag

Website
- www.bpfassam.in

The Bodoland People's Front (BPF) is a state political party in Assam, India. The party is headquartered in Kokrajhar Town and was previously part of the ruling government in the autonomous region of Bodoland. The BPF and UPPL are the two main regional parties of Assam from Bodoland.

== History ==
The BPF was formed as political party in year 2005, Hagrama Mohilary and Emmanuel Mosahary were selected as the President and the General Secretary of the new party. Hagrama Mohilary formed the first Elected Executive Bodoland Territorial Council after the end of the election.

Bodoland Peoples Front formed as per the resolution Vide No. 3, adopted in the Political convention held on 4th and 5th December 2005, as per BPF constitution, BPF shall bear true faith and allegiance to the constitution of India as established by law and to the principles of democracy, socialism and secularism as enshrined in the Indian Constitution, and also solemnly affirm our commitment to work for upholding the sovereignty, unity and integrity of India. To work for strengthening the Indian Nationalism providing due respect to the identities of all sections of people.

The party began its journey in the 2011 Assam Legislative election where the party stormed and surprised everyone by winning 12 seats. The party also became the 3rd largest party behind INC and AIUDF, despite the fact that the party had only contested 29 seats. Ahead of the 2016 Assam legislative election the party joined the National Democratic Alliance. The party was assigned 16 seats as per the agreement and won the same 12 seats. Despite just winning 12 seats, the party had the best winning percentage and was part of the government in Assam. Then in 2021 the party left National Democratic Alliance and joined the United Progressive Alliance ahead of the 2021 Assam election. The party was assigned 12 seats and ended up winning only 4 seats. Later the party decided to formally announce its departure from United Progressive Alliance, due to poor performance in the election. Ahead of the 2026 Assam legislative election the party joined the National Democratic Alliance. The party was assigned 11 seats as per the agreement and won the 10 seats. Despite winning 10 seats, the party had the best winning percentage and was part of the government in Assam.

== Electoral performance ==
Assam Legislative Assembly Elections
Year	Party leader	Seats contested	Seats won	Change in seats	Percentage of votes	Vote swing	Popular vote	Result
2026	Hagrama Mohilary	11	10	▲6	3.73%		807,546	Government
2021	Hagrama Mohilary	12	4	▼8	3.39%		651,073	Opposition, Later others
2016	Hagrama Mohilary	16	12	Steady	3.94%		666,057	Government
2011	Hagrama Mohilary	29	12	▲12	6.13%		847,520	Outside Support for Government

== Elected Representatives ==
=== Members of Parliament ===
Houses	No.	Year	Name	Constituency	Margin
Lok Sabha	1	2009	Sansuma Khunggur Bwiswmuthiary	Kokrajhar	1,90,352
Rajya Sabha	2	2008	Biswajit Daimary	Assam	
Rajya Sabha	2	2014	Biswajit Daimary	Assam	
Rajya Sabha	2	2020	Biswajit Daimary	Assam	

=== List of Ministers ===
Year	Name	Constituency	Ministry
2006	Chandan Brahma	Sidli	Second Tarun Gogoi ministry
2011	Chandan Brahma	Sidli	Third Tarun Gogoi ministry
2016	Chandan Brahma	Sidli	Sonowal ministry
2016	Pramila Rani Brahma	Kokrajhar East	Sonowal ministry
2016	Rihon Daimary	Udalguri	Sonowal ministry
2021	Charan Boro	Majbat	First Sarma ministry
2026	Charan Boro	Majbat	Second Sarma ministry

== Development in BTC ==
=== Educational Institutions ===
- Bodoland University, Kokrajhar
- Central Institute of Technology, Kokrajhar
- Bineswar Brahma Engineering College, Kokrajhar
- Medical College, Besorgaon, Kokrajhar
- Nursing College, Kokrajhar

BTC chief Hagrama Mohilary laid the foundation stone of Udalguri Engineering College.

Mohilary also laid the foundation stone of a Rs 26-crore IT park at Onthai Gwlao, Chandamari, nearly 4 km northwest of Kokrajhar town.

== See also ==
- Bodo Liberation Tigers Force
- Bodo People's Progressive Front
- List of political parties in India
- Sanmilita Gana Shakti
