= 2021 Assam Legislative Assembly election =

Indian state election

- 27 March, 1 & 6 April 2021

All 126 seats in the Assam Legislative Assembly 64 seats needed for a majority
- Opinion polls
- Registered: 23,436,864
- Turnout: 82.42% (▼2.30 pp)
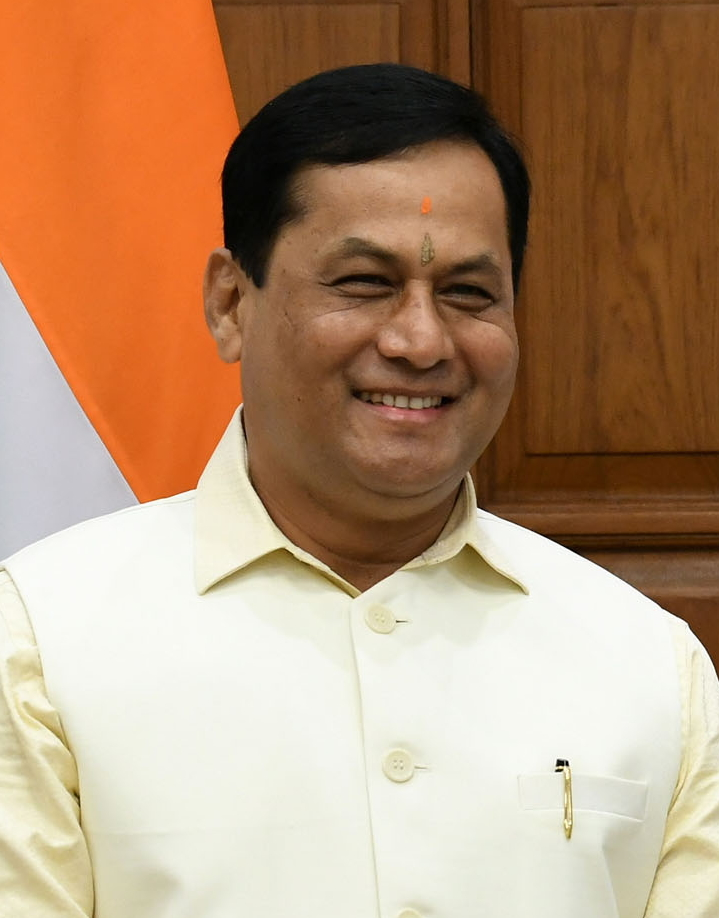

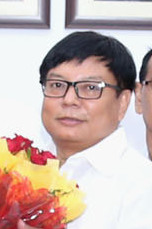
	Majority party	Minority party
Leader	Sarbananda Sonowal	Debabrata Saikia
Party	BJP	INC
Alliance	NEDA	Mahajot
Leader since	2016	2016
Leader's seat	Majuli	Nazira
Last election	29.5%, 60 seats	30.9%, 26 seats
Seats won	60	29
Seat change	Steady	▲3
Popular vote	6,384,538	5,703,341
Percentage	33.21%	29.67%
Swing	▲3.70 pp	▼1.29 pp
Alliance seats	75	50
Seat change	▼11	New
Alliance vote	8,556,059	8,396,486
Alliance percentage	44.51%	43.68%
Alliance swing	▲2.61 pp	New

Chief Minister before election
Sarbananda Sonowal
BJP
Elected Chief Minister
Himanta Biswa Sarma
BJP

The 2021 Assam Legislative Assembly election was the 15th quinquennial legislative assembly election held in the Indian state of Assam from March 27 to April 6 in three phases, to elect 126 MLAs to the 15th Assam Legislative Assembly. The votes were counted and the result declared on Sunday, 2 May. The term of the 14th Legislative Assembly of Assam ended on 31 May 2021.

The election saw the incumbent BJP-led National Democratic Alliance (NDA) retaining power with 75 seats, which marked the first time a non-INC alliance won consecutive terms in the state. The Mahajot led by INC won 50 seats, increasing its tally from 26 in 2016. Jailed activist and Raijor Dal founder and President Akhil Gogoi contested the election as an independent candidate and won the Sibsagar seat by a margin of 11,875 votes.

== Background ==
Constituencies of Assam Legislative Assembly

The election in 2016 brought a change of power as the Indian National Congress (INC), which had formed the government under Tarun Gogoi since 2001, lost its majority to the Bharatiya Janata Party led by Sarbananda Sonowal.

=== Demographics ===
According to the 2011 census, 61.5% were Hindus, 34.22% were Muslims. Christian minorities (3.7%) are mostly among some of the Scheduled Castes and Tribes (SC/ST) population.

The six communities in Assam – Maran, Matak, Tai Ahom, Chutia, Koch Rajbongshi and the tea tribes have been demanding the grant of ST status since a long time. These six communities are numerous and would play a major role in the elections. The Scheduled Tribe population (both ST(Plains) and ST(Hills))combined in Assam is around 13% of which the Bodo people (an indigenous Assamese community) account for 40% and the Scheduled Caste population is about 7.4% of which the Kaibarta and Jal Keot (both indigenous Assamese & migrant Bengali communities) combined account for about 36%.

Out of 32 districts of Assam, 11 are Muslim majority according to the 2011 census. These districts are Dhubri, Goalpara, Barpeta, Morigaon, Nagaon, Hojai, Karimganj, South Salmara–Mankachar, Hailakandi, Darrang and Bongaigaon. Bodos have a population share of 12% and the Kaibarta and Jal Keot have a total share of about 10% (all of which are a part of the indigenous Assamese community). The share of the indigenous Assamese communities in Assam was about 47% in the 2001 census which has reduced to about 40-45% in 2016 as predicted by the experts. Indigenous Assamese Muslims, also known as Khilonjia Muslims, include ethnic groups such as Goria and Moria, and are estimated to be around 40 lakhs in population out of a total 1 crore (4 million out of 10 million) Muslims in Assam.

== Voter statistics ==
According to the CEO office, 23,374,087 General electors were eligible to vote in the Assam Assembly election. Of these, 132,081 voters had disabilities, 289,474 voters were above the age of 80, 1,281,918 were newly enrolled voters, and 505,874 voters were in the age group of 18–19 years. Apart from these, there were also 63,074 service voters. More than 1.08 lakh D-voters were barred from casting their votes in this election.

Total electors	Male voters	Female voters	Third gender voters	Service voters	Overseas electors
23,437,172	11,823,286	11,550,403	398	63,074	11

== Schedule ==
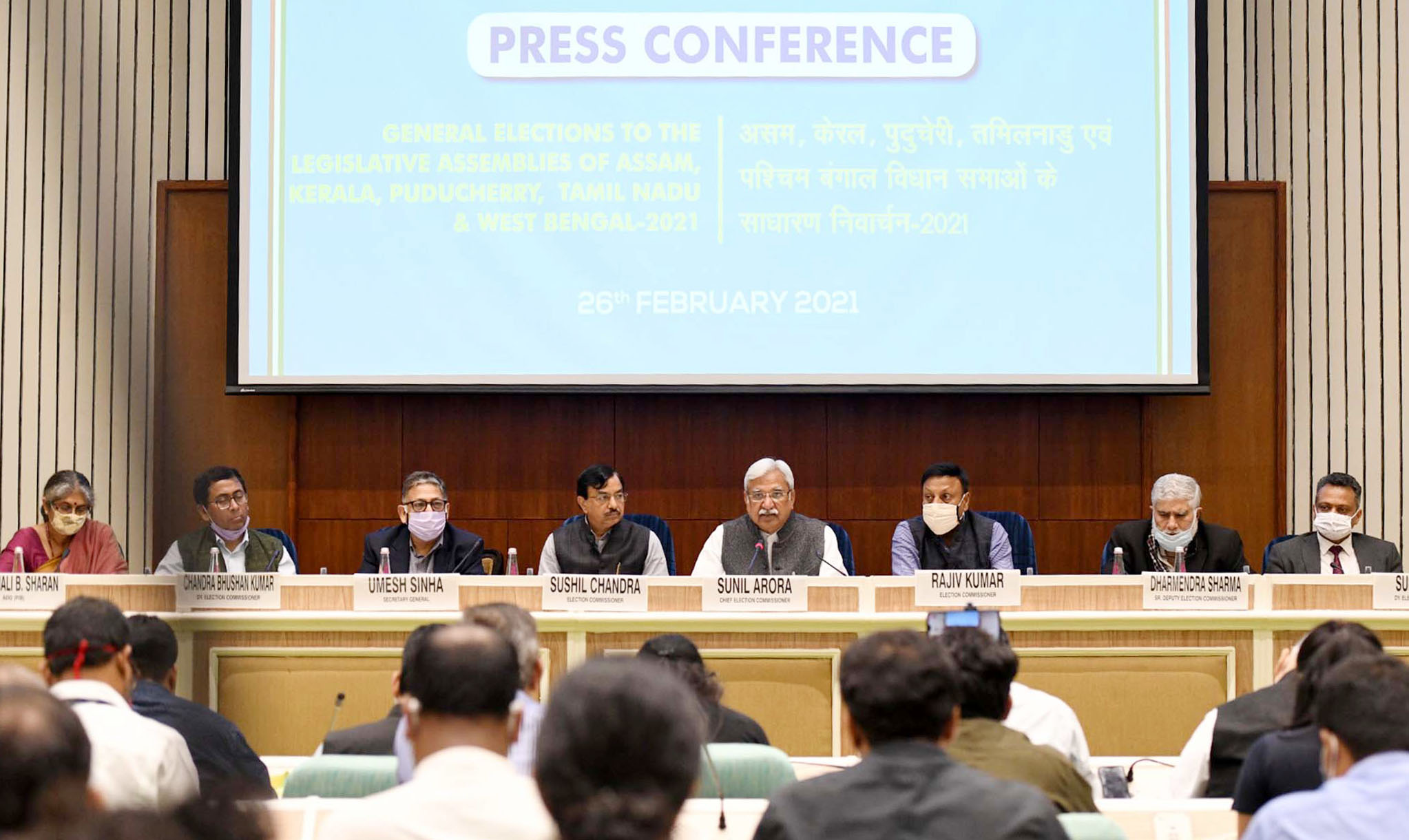
The Chief Election Commissioner, Sunil Arora holding a press conference to announce the schedule for Legislative Assembly election of Assam along with West Bengal, Kerala, Tamil Nadu, and Puducherry, in New Delhi on February 26, 2021. The Election Commissioners, Sushil Chandra and Rajiv Kumar and the senior officials of ECI are also seen.

Poll event	Phase		
Poll event	I	II	III
Constituencies	47	39	40
Map of constituencies and their phases			
Date of issue of notification	2 March 2021	5 March 2021	12 March 2021
Last date for filling nomination	9 March 2021	12 March 2021	19 March 2021
Scrutiny of nomination	10 March 2021	15 March 2021	20 March 2021
Last date for withdrawal of nomination	12 March 2021	17 March 2021	22 March 2021
Date of poll	27 March 2021	1 April 2021	6 April 2021
Date of counting of votes	2 May 2021		
Source: Election Commission of India

== Parties and alliances ==
=== National Democratic Alliance ===
Map of the seat sharing arrangements between the parties of NDA for the 2021 Assam Legislative Assembly election

Party		Symbol	Leader	Contesting seats
Bharatiya Janata Party	BJP		Ranjeet Kumar Dass	93
Asom Gana Parishad	AGP		Atul Bora	25
United People's Party Liberal	UPPL		Pramod Boro	8

=== Mahajot ===
Map of the seat sharing arrangements between the parties of Mahajath or the UPA for the 2021 Assam Legislative Assembly election

Party		Symbol	Leader	Seat share
Indian National Congress	INC		Debabrata Saikia	95
All India United Democratic Front	AIUDF		Badruddin Ajmal	20
Bodoland People's Front	BOPF		Hagrama Mohilary	12
Communist Party of India (Marxist)	CPI(M)		Deben Bhattacharyya	2
Communist Party of India	CPI		Munin Mahanta	1
Communist Party of India (Marxist–Leninist) Liberation	CPI (ML)L		Rupun Sarma	1 (Note: CPI(ML) Liberation contested 4 seats out of which only 1 candidate was supported by Mahajot.)
Anchalik Gana Morcha (Note: AGM had contested as Independent.)	AGM		Ajit Kumar Bhuyan	1
Rashtriya Janata Dal	RJD		Hira Devi	1

=== URF ===
Map of the seat sharing arrangements between the parties of United Regional Front for the 2021 Assam Legislative Assembly election

No.		Symbol	Leader(s)	Contesting seats
Assam Jatiya Parishad	AJP		Lurinjyoti Gogoi	82
Raijor Dal	RD		Akhil Gogoi	29
Autonomous State Demand Committee	ASDC		Chandra Kanta Terang	4

=== Others ===
Party		Symbol	Leader	Contesting seats
National People's Party	NPP			11

== Candidates ==
Assembly constituency		NDA		Mahajot		Voting phase/date
No.	Name	Party	Candidates	Party	Candidate	Voting phase/date
Sribhumi District
1	Ratabari (SC)	BJP	Bijoy Malakar	INC	Sambhu Sing Mallah	01-04-2021
2	Patharkandi	BJP	Krishnendu Paul	INC	Sachin Sahoo	01-04-2021
3	Karimganj North	BJP	Dr. Manash Das	INC	Kamalakhya Dey Purkayastha	01-04-2021
4	Karimganj South	AGP	Aziz Ahmed Khan	INC	Siddique Ahmed	01-04-2021
5	Badarpur	BJP	Biswarup Bhattacharjee	AIUDF	Abdul Aziz	01-04-2021
Hailakandi District
6	Hailakandi	BJP	Milan Das	AIUDF	Jakir Hussain Laskar	01-04-2021
7	Katlicherra	BJP	Subrata Nath	AIUDF	Suzamuddin Laskar	01-04-2021
8	Algapur	AGP	Aptabuddin Laskar	AIUDF	Nizamuddin Choudhury	01-04-2021
Cachar District
9	Silchar	BJP	Dipayan Chakraborty	INC	Tamal Kanti Banik	01-04-2021
10	Sonai	BJP	Aminul Haque Laskar	AIUDF	Karimuddin Barbhuiya	01-04-2021
11	Dholai (SC)	BJP	Parimal Suklabaidya	INC	Kamakhya Prasad Mala	01-04-2021
12	Udharbond	BJP	Mihir Kanti Shome	INC	Ajit Singh	01-04-2021
13	Lakhipur	BJP	Kaushik Rai	INC	Mukesh Pandey	01-04-2021
14	Barkhola	BJP	Amalendu Das	INC	Misbahul Islam Laskar	01-04-2021
15	Katigorah	BJP	Gautam Roy	INC	Khalil Uddin Mazumder	01-04-2021
Dima Hasao District
16	Haflong (ST)	BJP	Nandita Garlosa	INC	Nirmal Langthasa	01-04-2021
Karbi Anglong District
17	Bokajan (ST)	BJP	Numal Momin	INC	Raton Engti	01-04-2021
18	Howraghat (ST)	BJP	Dorsing Ronghang	INC	Sanjeeb Teron	01-04-2021
19	Diphu (ST)	BJP	Bidya Sing Engleng	INC	Sum Ronghang	01-04-2021
West Karbi Anglong District
20	Baithalangso (ST)	BJP	Roop Sing Terang	INC	Augustine Enghee	01-04-2021
South Salmara District
21	Mankachar	AGP	Javed Islam	AIUDF	Adv.Aminul Islam	06-04-2021
22	Salmara South	BJP	Ashadul Islam	INC	Wazid Ali Chaudhary	06-04-2021
Dhubri District
23	Dhubri	BJP	Dr.Debamoy Sanyal	AIUDF	Nazrul Hoque	06-04-2021
24	Gauripur	BJP	Banendra Mushahary	AIUDF	Nijanur Rahman	06-04-2021
25	Golakganj	BJP	Ashwini Roy Sarkar	INC	Abdus Sobahun Ali Sarkar	06-04-2021
26	Bilasipara West	BJP	Abu Bakkar Siddique	AIUDF	Hafiz Bashir Ahmed	06-04-2021
27	Bilasipara East	BJP	Ashok Kumar Singhi	AIUDF	Samsul Huda	06-04-2021
Kokrajhar District
28	Gossaigaon	UPPL	Somnath Narzary	BPF	Majendra Narzary	06-04-2021
29	Kokrajhar West (ST)	UPPL	Manaranjan Brahma	BPF	Rabiram Narzary	06-04-2021
30	Kokrajhar East (ST)	UPPL	Lawrence Islary	BPF	Pramila Rani Brahma	06-04-2021
Chirang District
31	Sidli (ST)	UPPL	Jayanta Basumatary	BPF	Chandan Brahma	06-04-2021
Bongaigaon District
32	Bongaigaon	AGP	Phani Bhusan Choudhury	INC	Shankar Prasad Rai	06-04-2021
Chirang District
33	Bijni	BJP	Ajoy Kumar Roy	BPF	Kamal Singh Narzary	06-04-2021
Bongaigaon District
34	Abhayapuri North	AGP	Bhupen Ray	INC	Abdul Bhatim Khandkar	06-04-2021
35	Abhayapuri South (SC)	AGP	Punendra Banikya	INC	Pradip Sarkar	06-04-2021
Goalpara District
36	Dudhnai (ST)	BJP	Shyamjit Rabha	INC	Jadab Sawargiary	06-04-2021
37	Goalpara East	AGP	Jyotish Das	INC	Abdul Kalam Rashid Alam	06-04-2021
38	Goalpara West	AGP	Sheikh Shah Alam	INC	Md. Abdur Rashid Mandal	06-04-2021
39	Jaleswar	BJP	Osman Goni	INC	Aftab Uddin Mollah	06-04-2021
Barpeta District
40	Sorbhog	BJP	Sankar Chandra Das	CPI(M)	Manoranjan Talukdar	06-04-2021
Bajali District
41	Bhabanipur	AGP	Ranjit Deka	AIUDF	Foni Talukdar	06-04-2021
42	Patacharkuchi	BJP	Ranjeet Kumar Dass	INC	Santanu Sarma	06-04-2021
Barpeta District
43	Barpeta	AGP	Gunindra Nath Das	INC	Abdur Rahim Ahmed	06-04-2021
44	Jania	BJP	Shahidul Islam	AIUDF	Hafiz Rafiqul Islam	06-04-2021
45	Baghbor	BJP	Hasinara Khatun	INC	Sherman Ali Ahmed	06-04-2021
46	Sarukhetri	AGP	Kalpana Patowary	INC	Jakir Hussain Sikdar	06-04-2021
47	Chenga	AGP	Rabiul Hussain	INC	Sukur Ali Ahmed	06-04-2021
Kamrup District
48	Boko (SC)	AGP	Jyoti Prasad Das	INC	Nandita Das	06-04-2021
49	Chaygaon	AGP	Kamala Kanta Kalita	INC	Rekibuddun Ahmed	06-04-2021
50	Palasbari	BJP	Hemanga Thakuria	INC	Jatin Mali	06-04-2021
Kamrup Metropolitan District
51	Jalukbari	BJP	Himanta Biswa Sarma	INC	Ramen Chandra Borthakur	06-04-2021
52	Dispur	BJP	Atul Bora	INC	Manjit Mahanta	06-04-2021
53	Gauhati East	BJP	Siddhartha Bhattacharya	INC	Smt. Ashima Bordoloi	06-04-2021
54	Gauhati West	AGP	Ramendra Narayan Kalita	INC	Smt. Mira Borthakur Goswami	06-04-2021
Kamrup District
55	Hajo	BJP	Suman Haripriya	INC	Anowar Hussain	06-04-2021
56	Kamalpur	BJP	Diganta Kalita	INC	Kishor Bhattacharya	01-04-2021
57	Rangia	BJP	Bhabesh Kalita	CPI(M)	Dr Bhagwan Dev Misra	01-04-2021
Baksa District
58	Tamulpur	UPPL	Leho Ram Boro	BPF	Ramdas Basumatary	06-04-2021
Nalbari District
59	Nalbari	BJP	Jayanta Malla Baruah	INC	Pradyut Kumar Bhuyan	01-04-2021
60	Barkhetry	BJP	Narayan Deka	INC	Diganta Barman	06-04-2021
61	Dharmapur	BJP	Chandra Mohan Patowary	INC	Ratul Patowary	06-04-2021
Baksa District
62	Barama (ST)	UPPL	Bhupen Baro	BPF	Prabin Boro	06-04-2021
63	Chapaguri (ST)	UPPL	Urkhao Gwra Brahma	BPF	Hitesh Basumatary	06-04-2021
Udalguri District
64	Panery	BJP	Biswajit Daimary	BPF	Karuna Kanta Swargiary	01-04-2021
Darrang District
65	Kalaigaon	BJP	Madhuram Deka	BPF	Durgadas Boro	01-04-2021
66	Sipajhar	BJP	Paramananda Rajbongshi	INC	Kuldip Barua	01-04-2021
67	Mangaldoi (SC)	BJP	Gurujyoti Das	INC	Basanta Das	01-04-2021
68	Dalgaon	AGP	Habibur Rahman	INC	Ilias Ali	01-04-2021
Udalguri District
69	Udalguri (ST)	UPPL	Gobinda Basumatary	BPF	Rihon Daimary	01-04-2021
70	Majbat	BJP	Jitu Kissan	BPF	Charan Boro	01-04-2021
Sonitpur District
71	Dhekiajuli	BJP	Ashok Singhal	INC	Benudhar Nath	27-03-2021
72	Barchalla	BJP	Ganesh Kumar Limbu	INC	Ram Prasad Sharma	27-03-2021
73	Tezpur	AGP	Prithviraj Rabha	INC	Anuj Kumar Mech	27-03-2021
74	Rangapara	BJP	Krishna Kamal Tanti	INC	Abhijit Hazarika	27-03-2021
75	Sootea	BJP	Padma Hazarika	INC	Praneshwar Basumatary	27-03-2021
Biswanath District
76	Biswanath	BJP	Promod Borthakur	INC	Anjan Borah	27-03-2021
77	Behali	BJP	Ranjit Dutta	CPI(ML)L	Bibek Das	27-03-2021
Sonitpur District
78	Gohpur	BJP	Utpal Borah	INC	Ripun Bora	27-03-2021
Morigaon District
79	Jagiroad (SC)	BJP	Pijush Hazarika	INC	Swapan Kumar Mandal	01-04-2021
80	Marigaon	BJP	Rama Kanta Dewri	CPI	Munin Mahanta	01-04-2021
81	Laharighat	BJP	Kadiru Jjaman Zinnah	INC	Asif Mohd Nazar	01-04-2021
Nagaon District
82	Raha (SC)	AGP	Bishnu Das	INC	Sashi Kanta Das	01-04-2021
83	Dhing	BJP	Sanjib Kumar Bora	AIUDF	Alhaj Aminul Islam	27-03-2021
84	Batadroba	BJP	Angoorlata Deka	INC	Sibamoni Bora	27-03-2021
85	Rupohihat	BJP	Nazir Hussain	INC	Nurul Hoda	27-03-2021
86	Nowgong	BJP	Rupak Sharma	INC	Santanu Sarma	01-04-2021
87	Barhampur	BJP	Jitu Goswami	INC	Suresh Borah	01-04-2021
88	Samaguri	BJP	Anil Saikia	INC	Rockybul Hussain	27-03-2021
89	Kaliabor	AGP	Keshab Mahanta	INC	Prasanta Kumar Saikia	27-03-2021
Hojai District
90	Jamunamukh	AGP	Sadiqulla Bhuyan	AIUDF	Sirajuddin Ajmal	01-04-2021
91	Hojai	BJP	Ramkrishna Ghosh	INC	Debabrata Saha	01-04-2021
92	Lumding	BJP	Sibu Misra	INC	Swapan Kar	01-04-2021
Golaghat District
93	Bokakhat	AGP	Atul Bora	IND	Pranab Doley	27-03-2021
94	Sarupathar	BJP	Biswajit Phukan	INC	Roselina Tirkey	27-03-2021
95	Golaghat	BJP	Ajanta Neog	INC	Bitupan Saikia	27-03-2021
96	Khumtai	BJP	Mrinal Saikia	INC	Bismita Gogoi	27-03-2021
97	Dergaon (SC)	AGP	Bhabendra Nath Bharali	INC	Bani Hazarika	27-03-2021
Jorhat District
98	Jorhat	BJP	Hitendra Nath Goswami	INC	Rana Goswami	27-03-2021
Majuli District
99	Majuli (ST)	BJP	Sarbananda Sonowal	INC	Rajib Lochan Pegu	27-03-2021
Jorhat District
100	Titabar	BJP	Hemanta Kalita	INC	Bhaskar Jyoti Baruah	27-03-2021
101	Mariani	BJP	Ramani Tanti	INC	Rupjyoti Kurmi	27-03-2021
102	Teok	AGP	Renupoma Rajkhowa	INC	Pallabi Gogoi	27-03-2021
Sibsagar District
103	Amguri	AGP	Prodip Hazarika	INC	Angkita Dutta	27-03-2021
104	Nazira	BJP	Mayur Buragohain	INC	Debabrata Saikia	27-03-2021
Charaideo District
105	Mahmara	BJP	Jogen Mohan	INC	Suruj Dehingia	27-03-2021
106	Sonari	BJP	Dharmeswar Konwar	INC	Sushil Kumar Suri	27-03-2021
Sibsagar District
107	Thowra	BJP	Kushal Dowari	INC	Sushanta Borgohain	27-03-2021
108	Sibsagar	BJP	Surabhi Rajkonwar	INC	Subhramitra Gogoi	27-03-2021
Lakhimpur District
109	Bihpuria	BJP	Amiya Kumar Bhuyan	INC	Bhupen Kumar Borah	27-03-2021
110	Naoboicha	AGP	Jayanta Khaund	INC	Bharat Narah	27-03-2021
111	Lakhimpur	BJP	Manab Deka	INC	Joy Prakash	27-03-2021
112	Dhakuakhana (ST)	BJP	Naba Kumar Doley	INC	Padma Lochan Doley	27-03-2021
Dhemaji District
113	Dhemaji (ST)	BJP	Ranoj Pegu	INC	Sailen Sonowal	27-03-2021
114	Jonai (ST)	BJP	Bhubon Pegu	INC	Hema Hari Prasanna Pegu	27-03-2021
Dibrugarh District
115	Moran	BJP	Chakradhar Gogoi	INC	Pranjal Ghatowar	27-03-2021
116	Dibrugarh	BJP	Prasanta Phukan	INC	Rajkumar Nilanetra Neog	27-03-2021
117	Lahowal	BJP	Binod Hazarika	INC	Manoj Dhanowar	27-03-2021
118	Duliajan	BJP	Terash Gowalla	INC	Dhruba Gogoi	27-03-2021
119	Tingkhong	BJP	Bimal Bora	INC	Atuwa Munda	27-03-2021
120	Naharkatia	BJP	Taranga Gogoi	INC	Pranatee Phukan	27-03-2021
121	Chabua	AGP	Ponakan Barua	INC	Ajay Phukan	27-03-2021
Tinsukia District
122	Tinsukia	BJP	Sanjoy Kishan	RJD	Hira Devi Choudhary	27-03-2021
123	Digboi	BJP	Suren Phukan	INC	Sibanath Chetia	27-03-2021
124	Margherita	BJP	Bhaskar Sharma	INC	Manoranjan Borgohain	27-03-2021
125	Doom Dooma	BJP	Rupesh Gowala	INC	Durga Bhumij	27-03-2021
126	Sadiya	BJP	Bolin Chetia	INC	Lakhin Chandra Chetia	27-03-2021

== Surveys and polls ==
Poll type	Date published	Polling agency				Lead	Ref.
Poll type	Date published	Polling agency	NDA	Mahajot	Others	Lead	Ref.
Exit poll	29 April 2021	Republic-CNX	74-84	40-50	1-3	24-44	
Exit poll	29 April 2021	India Today-Axis My India	75-85	40-50	1-4	25-45	
Exit poll	29 April 2021	India News-Jan Ki Baat	70-81	45-55	0-1	15-36	
Exit poll	29 April 2021	Sudarshan News	65-75	45-55	0-4	10-30	
Exit poll	29 April 2021	ABP News- CVoter	58-71	53-66	0-5	Hung	
Exit poll	29 April 2021	News24-Today's Chanakya	70	56	0	14	
Exit poll	29 April 2021	TV9 Bharatvarsh-Polstrat	59-69	55-65	1-3	Hung	
Exit poll	29 April 2021	Times Now-CVoter	65	59	2	6	
Exit poll	29 April 2021	Pratidin Time	67	59	0-4	8	
Exit poll	29 April 2021	India Ahead-P Marq	62-70	56-64	0-4	Hung	
Opinion poll	24 March 2021	TV9 Bharatvarsh	73	50	3	23	
Opinion poll	24 March 2021	Times Now-CVoter	65-73	52-60	0-4	5-21	
Opinion poll	24 March 2021	ABP News- CVoter	65-73	52-60	0-4	5-21	
Opinion poll	23 March 2021	India News-Jan Ki Baat	68-78	48-58	0	10-20	
Opinion poll	15 March 2021	ABP News- CVoter	64-72	52-60	0-2	4-20	
Opinion poll	8 March 2021	Times Now-CVoter	67	57	2	10	
Opinion poll	27 February 2021	ABP News- CVoter	68-76	47-55	0-3	13-29	
Opinion poll	18 January 2021	ABP News- CVoter	73-81	41-49	0-4	24-40	

== Voting ==
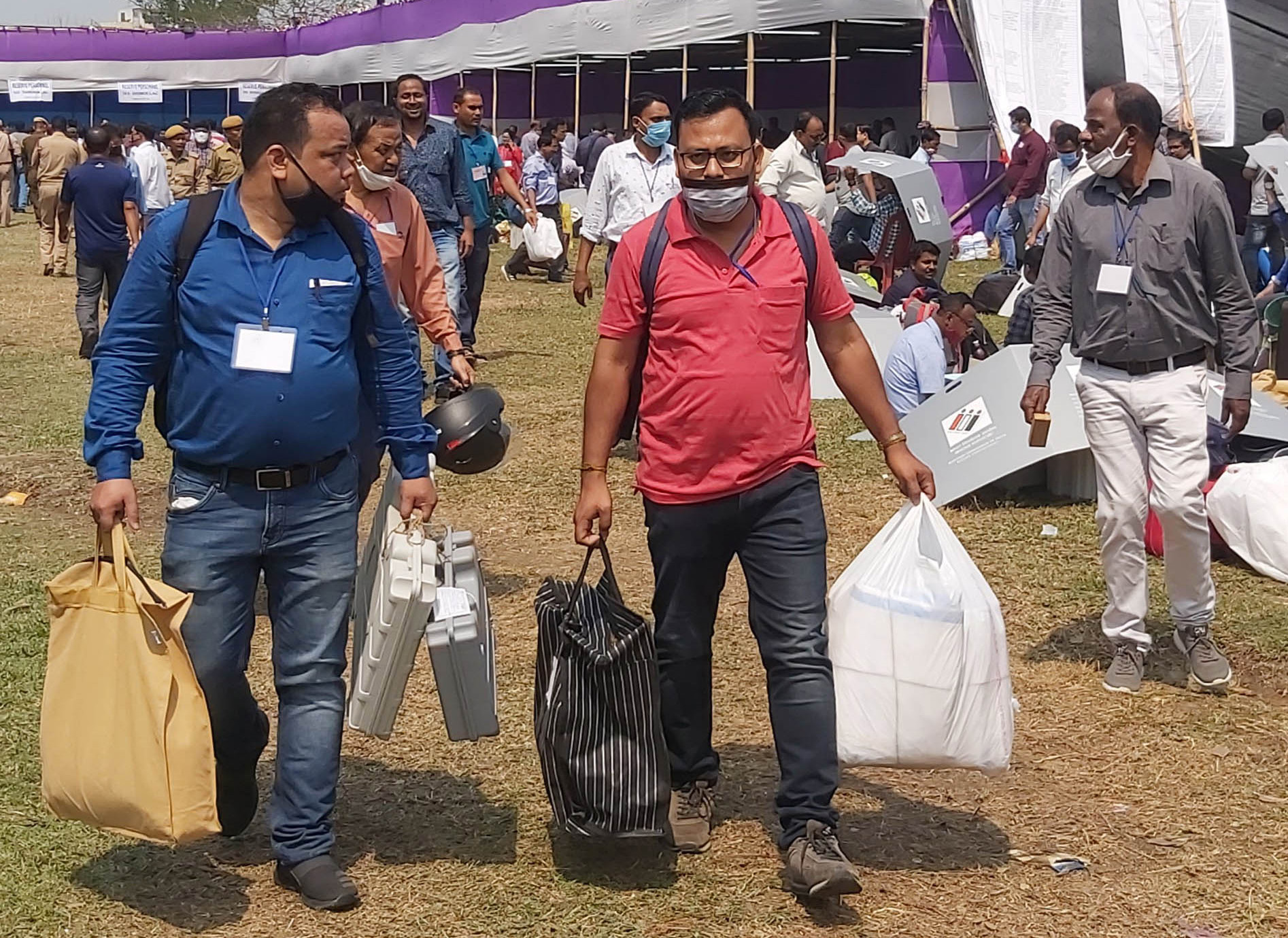
Polling officials carrying the electronic voting machine (EVMs) and other necessary inputs required for the Assam Assembly election, at a distribution centre, in Tinsukia, Assam on March 26, 2021

Voters showing mark of indelible ink after voting at a polling booth, during the first phase of the Assam Assembly election, at Kaliabhomora, Tezpur district, Assam on March 27, 2021

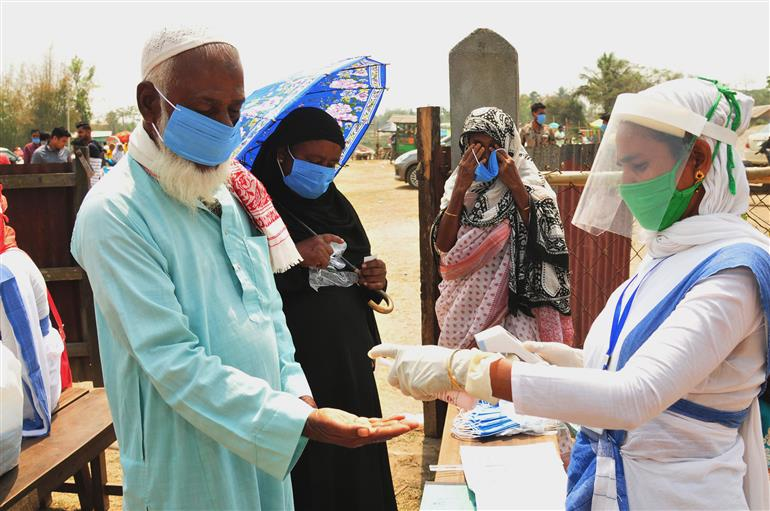
A volunteer conducting thermal screening of the voters, at a polling booth, during the first phase of the Assam Assembly election, at Kaliabhomora, Tezpur district, Assam on March 27, 2021

=== Turnout ===
Phase wise voter turnout
Phase	Turnout (in%)
Phase I	79.93
Phase II	80.96
Phase III	85.20
Total	82.42

=== Events ===
The Election commission suspended four polling officials after a polled Electronic Voting Machine (EVM) in Ratabari constituency in Karimganj district was transported to the strong room through a car belonging to relative of Krishnendu Paul, BJP candidate from neighbouring Patharkandi, after polling party's own car broke down during heavy rain on 9:00pm April 1, 2021. The commission also ordered for a repoll at the polling place where the EVM was taken from, despite all machines were packed and untouched. The vehicle was stopped after a mob was informed and they spotted the EVMs in another vehicle reaching the strong room. The video of the incident went viral.

=== Repoll ===
On 10 April 2021, the Election Commission of India (ECI) declared the polling held on 1 April 2021 at four polling stations across three Assembly constituencies as 'void' under Section 58(1)(b) of the Representation of the People Act, 1951. The Commission also ordered a repoll in these booths to be held on 20 April 2021.

== Results ==
=== Results by party/alliance ===
75	50	1
NDA	Mahajot	IND

Seat share by alliance
1. NDA (59.5%)
2. Mahajot (39.7%)
3. IND (0.79%)
Vote share by alliance
1. NDA (44.5%)
2. Mahajot (43.7%)
3. Others (11.8%)

Alliance	Party	Popular vote			Seats		
Alliance	Party	Vote	%	±pp	Contested	Won	+/-
National Democratic Alliance	BJP	6,384,538	33.21	▲3.70	93	60	Steady
National Democratic Alliance	AGP	1,519,777	7.91	▼0.23	22	9	▼5
National Democratic Alliance	UPPL	651,744	3.39	▲3.39	11	6	▲6
National Democratic Alliance	Total	8,556,059	44.51	▲2.61	126 (Note: In many seats, the coalition parties were in friendly contest.)	75	▼11
Mahajot	INC	5,703,341	29.67	▼1.29	95	29	▲3
Mahajot	AIUDF	1,786,551	9.29	▼3.76	20	16	▲3
Mahajot	BPF	651,073	3.39	▼0.55	12	4	▼8
Mahajot	CPI(M)	160,758	0.84	▲0.29	2	1	▲1
Mahajot	IND (Note: Pranab Doley from AGM contested as an independent candidate from Bokakhat Assembly constituency.)	27,749	0.14	—	1	0	—
Mahajot	CPI	27,290	0.14	▼0.08	1	0	Steady
Mahajot	CPI(ML)L	26,403	0.14	▲0.05	4 (Note: CPI(ML) Liberation contested 4 seats out of which only 1 candidate was supported by Mahajot.)	0	Steady
Mahajot	RJD	13,321	0.07	▲0.07	1	0	Steady
Mahajot	Total	8,396,486	43.68	▲12.72	126	50	▲24
None	32 other parties	911,054	4.74	N/A		0	Steady
None	IND	1,139,423	5.93	▼5.11	N/A	1	Steady
None	NOTA	219,578	1.14	▲0.02	N/A		
Total		19,222,600	100	N/A		126	
Valid votes		19,222,600	99.52	N/A			
Invalid votes		93,246	0.48	N/A			
Turnout		19,315,846	82.42	N/A			
Registered voters		23,436,864					

=== Results by district/division ===
District	Seats			
District	Seats	NDA	INC+	OTH
Barak Valley Division
Karimganj	5	2	3	—N/a
Hailakandi	3	—N/a	3	—N/a
Cachar	7	4	3	—N/a
Total	15	6	9	—N/a
Central Assam Division
Dima Hasao	1	1	—N/a	—N/a
Karbi Anglong	3	3	—N/a	—N/a
West Karbi Anglong	1	1	—N/a	—N/a
Morigaon	3	2	1	—N/a
Nagaon	8	3	5	—N/a
Hojai	3	2	1	—N/a
Total	19	12	7	—N/a
Lower Assam Division
South Salmara Mankachar	2	—N/a	2	—N/a
Dhubri	5	—N/a	5	—N/a
Kokrajhar	3	1	2	—N/a
Chirang	2	2	—N/a	—N/a
Bongaigaon	3	1	2	—N/a
Goalpara	4	—N/a	4	—N/a
Barpeta	6	—N/a	6	—N/a
Bajali	2	1	1	—N/a
Kamrup Rural	6	4	2	—N/a
Kamrup Metro	4	4	—N/a	—N/a
Baksa	3	3	—N/a	—N/a
Nalbari	3	2	1	—N/a
Total	43	18	25	—N/a
North Assam Division
Udalguri	3	2	1	—N/a
Darrang	4	1	3	—N/a
Sonitpur	6	6	—N/a	—N/a
Biswanath	2	2	—N/a	—N/a
Lakhimpur	4	3	1	—N/a
Dhemaji	2	2	—N/a	—N/a
Total	21	16	5	—N/a
Upper Assam Division
Golaghat	5	5	—N/a	—N/a
Jorhat	4	2	2	—N/a
Majuli	1	1	—N/a	—N/a
Sivasagar	4	1	2	1
Charaideo	2	2	—N/a	—N/a
Dibrugarh	7	7	—N/a	—N/a
Tinsukia	5	5	—N/a	—N/a
Total	28	23	4	1

=== Results by constituency ===
Assembly constituency		Winner				Runner-up				Margin
No.	Name	Candidate	Party	Votes	%	Candidate	Party	Votes	%	Margin
Karimganj District
1	Ratabari (SC)	Bijoy Malakar	BJP	84,711	61.92	Sambhu Sing Mallah	INC	48,490	35.44	36,221
2	Patharkandi	Krishnendu Paul	BJP	74,846	49.66	Sachin Sahoo	INC	70,379	46.70	4,467
3	Karimganj North	Kamalakhya Dey Purkayastha	INC	60,998	41.57	Dr. Manash Das	BJP	52,674	35.89	8,324
4	Karimganj South	Siddique Ahmed	INC	88,909	59.16	Aziz Ahmed Khan	AGP	56,422	37.54	32,487
5	Badarpur	Abdul Aziz	AIUDF	74,452	56.62	Biswarup Bhattacharjee	BJP	50,504	38.41	23,948
Hailakandi District
6	Hailakandi	Zakir Hussain Laskar	AIUDF	71,057	55.15	Milan Das	BJP	47,303	36.72	23,754
7	Katlicherra	Sujam Uddin Laskar	AIUDF	79,769	51.83	Subrata Nath	BJP	66,798	43.41	12,971
8	Algapur	Nizamuddin Choudhury	AIUDF	66,785	49.46	Mun Swarnakar	BJP	49,181	36.42	17,604
Cachar District
9	Silchar	Dipayan Chakraborty	BJP	98,558	56.17	Tamal Kanti Banik	INC	60,980	34.75	37,578
10	Sonai	Karim Uddin Barbhuiya	AIUDF	71,937	48.83	Aminul Haque Laskar	BJP	52,283	35.49	19,654
11	Dholai (SC)	Parimal Suklabaidya	BJP	82,568	55.03	Kamakhya Prasad Mala	INC	62,176	41.44	20,392
12	Udharbond	Mihir Kanti Shome	BJP	61,745	47.34	Ajit Singh	INC	59,060	45.28	2,685
13	Lakhipur	Kaushik Rai	BJP	55,341	44.61	Mukesh Pandey	INC	42,641	34.38	12,700
14	Barkhola	Misbahul Islam Laskar	INC	64,433	51.77	Amalendu Das	BJP	57,402	46.12	7,031
15	Katigorah	Khalil Uddin Mazumder	INC	83,268	51.22	Gautam Roy	BJP	76,329	46.95	6,939
Dima Hasao District
16	Haflong (ST)	Nandita Garlosa	BJP	67,797	56.73	Nirmal Langthasa	INC	49,199	41.16	18,598
Karbi Anglong District
17	Bokajan (ST)	Numal Momin	BJP	60,726	51.05	Raton Engti	INC	42,841	36.02	17,885
18	Howraghat (ST)	Dorsing Ronghang	BJP	57,927	55.74	Sanjeeb Teron	INC	26,244	25.25	31,683
19	Diphu (ST)	Bidya Sing Engleng	BJP	77,032	50.58	Sum Ronghang	INC	36,504	23.97	40,528
West Karbi Anglong District
20	Baithalangso (ST)	Rupsing Teron	BJP	89,715	55.00	Augustine Enghee	INC	36,278	22.24	53,437
South Salmara District
21	Mankachar	Adv. Aminul Islam	AIUDF	125,873	60.72	Javed Islam	AGP	69,033	33.30	56,840
22	Salmara South	Wazed Ali Choudhury	INC	146,248	83.98	Nurul Islam Mollah	IND	10,674	6.13	135,574
Dhubri District
23	Dhubri	Nazrul Hoque	AIUDF	123,913	70.24	Dr. Debamoy Sanyal	BJP	46,100	26.13	77,813
24	Gauripur	Nijanur Rahman	AIUDF	112,194	61.07	Banendra Mushahary	BJP	63,349	34.48	48,845
25	Golakganj	Abdus Sobahun Ali Sarkar	INC	89,870	48.96	Ashwini Roy Sarkar	BJP	79,171	43.14	10,699
26	Bilasipara West	Hafiz Bashir Ahmed	AIUDF	90,529	56.16	Ali Akbar Miah	IND	30,771	19.09	59,758
27	Bilasipara East	Samsul Huda	AIUDF	116,714	59.30	Ashok Kumar Singhi	BJP	66,768	34.11	49,300
Kokrajhar District
28	Gossaigaon	Majendra Narzary	BPF	70,407	45.19	Somnath Narzary	UPPL	60,064	38.55	10,343
29	Kokrajhar West (ST)	Rabiram Narzary	BPF	77,509	49.68	Manaranjan Brahma	UPPL	65,438	41.94	12,071
30	Kokrajhar East (ST)	Lawrence Islary	UPPL	82,817	54.14	Pramila Rani Brahma	BPF	63,420	41.11	19,397
Chirang District
31	Sidli (ST)	Joyanta Basumatary	UPPL	97,087	56.50	Chandan Brahma	BPF	65,767	38.27	31,320
Bongaigaon District
32	Bongaigaon	Phani Bhusan Choudhury	AGP	82,800	53.90	Shankar Prasad Rai	INC	44,633	29.05	38,167
Chirang District
33	Bijni	Ajoy Kumar Ray	BJP	45,733	32.69	Kamal Singh Narzary	BPF	44,730	31.97	1,003
Bongaigaon District
34	Abhayapuri North	Abdul Batin Khandkar	INC	93,276	58.58	Bhupen Ray	AGP	60,495	38.00	32,781
35	Abhayapuri South (SC)	Pradip Sarkar	INC	112,954	61.04	Punendra Banikya	AGP	65,869	35.59	47,085
Goalpara District
36	Dudhnai (ST)	Jadab Sawargiary	INC	78,551	43.46	Shyamjit Rabha	BJP	77,275	42.75	1,276
37	Goalpara East	Abdul Kalam Rasheed Alam	INC	112,995	57.81	Jyotish Das	AGP	67,747	34.66	45,248
38	Goalpara West	Md. Abdur Rashid Mandal	INC	85,752	54.18	Sheikh Shah Alam	AGP	39,728	25.10	46,024
39	Jaleswar	Aftabuddin Mollah	INC	76,026	50.75	Dr. Reza M. A. Amin	AIUDF	54,046	36.08	21,980
Barpeta District
40	Sorbhog	Manoranjan Talukdar	CPI(M)	96,134	50.21	Sankar Chandra Das	BJP	85,872	44.85	10,262
Bajali District
41	Bhabanipur	Phanidhar Talukdar	AIUDF	55,975	44.57	Ranjit Deka	AGP	52,748	42.00	3,227
42	Patacharkuchi	Ranjeet Kumar Dass	BJP	81,284	71.67	Santanu Sarma	INC	18,431	16.25	62,853
Barpeta District
43	Barpeta	Abdur Rahim Ahmed	INC	111,083	61.04	Gunindra Nath Das	AGP	66,364	36.47	44,719
44	Jania	Rafiqul Islam	AIUDF	156,183	84.60	Shahidul Islam	BJP	11,408	6.18	144,775
45	Baghbor	Sherman Ali Ahmed	INC	79,357	52.46	Rajib Ahmed	AIUDF	65,415	43.24	13,942
46	Sarukhetri	Jakir Hussain Sikdar	INC	77,045	43.07	Kalpana Patowary	AGP	47,504	26.56	29,541
47	Chenga	Ashraful Hussain	AIUDF	75,312	58.83	Rabiul Hussain	AGP	23,373	18.76	51,939
Kamrup District
48	Boko (SC)	Nandita Das	INC	120,613	58.82	Jyoti Prasad Das	AGP	68,147	33.23	52,466
49	Chaygaon	Rekibuddin Ahmed	INC	93,864	56.32	Kamala Kanta Kalita	AGP	65,820	39.50	28,044
50	Palasbari	Hemanga Thakuria	BJP	68,311	51.81	Pankaj Lochan Devgoswami	AJP	28,641	21.72	39,670
Kamrup Metropolitan District
51	Jalukbari	Himanta Biswa Sarma	BJP	130,762	77.39	Ramen Chandra Borthakur	INC	28,851	17.07	101,911
52	Dispur	Atul Bora	BJP	196,043	64.00	Manjit Mahanta	INC	74,386	24.28	121,657
53	Gauhati East	Siddhartha Bhattacharya	BJP	113,461	66.33	Ashima Bordoloi	INC	29,361	17.16	84,100
54	Gauhati West	Ramendra Narayan Kalita	AGP	137,533	59.87	Mira Borthakur Goswami	INC	59,084	25.72	78,449
Kamrup District
55	Hajo	Suman Haripriya	BJP	66,165	43.63	Dulu Ahmed	AJP	51,797	34.15	14,368
56	Kamalpur	Diganta Kalita	BJP	81,083	53.93	Kishor Bhattacharya	INC	62,969	41.89	18,114
57	Rangia	Bhabesh Kalita	BJP	84,844	52.11	Bhagaban Dev Misra	CPI(M)	64,624	39.69	20,220
Baksa District
58	Tamulpur	Leho Ram Boro	UPPL	78,818	46.75	Ramdas Basumatary	BPF	46,635	27.66	32,183
Nalbari District
59	Nalbari	Jayanta Malla Baruah	BJP	106,190	58.84	Pradyut Kumar Bhuyan	INC	56,733	31.43	49,457
60	Barkhetry	Diganta Barman	INC	85,826	49.46	Narayan Deka	BJP	81,772	47.13	4,054
61	Dharmapur	Chandra Mohan Patowary	BJP	68,362	56.73	Ratul Patowary	INC	43,328	35.96	25,034
Baksa District
62	Barama (ST)	Bhupen Boro	UPPL	62,385	46.78	Prabin Boro	BPF	38,613	28.96	23,772
63	Chapaguri (ST)	Urkhao Gwra Brahma	UPPL	61,804	48.58	Hitesh Basumatary	BPF	35,065	27.56	26,739
Udalguri District
64	Panery	Biswajit Daimary	BJP	72,639	60.82	Karuna Kanta Swargiary	BPF	36,787	30.80	35,852
Darrang District
65	Kalaigaon	Durga Das Boro	BPF	60,815	41.05	Madhu Ram Deka	BJP	53,713	36.26	7,102
66	Sipajhar	Parmananda Rajbongshi	BJP	74,739	50.33	Kuldip Barua	INC	67,605	45.52	7,134
67	Mangaldoi (SC)	Basanta Das	INC	111,386	54.68	Guru Jyoti Das	BJP	87,032	42.72	24,354
68	Dalgaon	Mazibur Rahman	AIUDF	118,342	55.20	Ilias Ali	INC	62,959	29.37	55,383
Udalguri District
69	Udalguri (ST)	Gobinda Chandra Basumatary	UPPL	61,767	50.43	Rihon Daimari	BPF	56,916	46.47	4,851
70	Majbat	Charan Boro	BPF	54,409	42.32	Jitu Kissan	BJP	38,352	29.83	16,057
Sonitpur District
71	Dhekiajuli	Ashok Singhal	BJP	93,768	56.89	Benudhar Nath	INC	58,698	35.62	35,070
72	Barchalla	Ganesh Kumar Limbu	BJP	70,569	51.50	Ram Prasad Sarma	INC	52,787	38.52	17,782
73	Tezpur	Prithiraj Rava	AGP	71,454	47.69	Anuj Kumar Mech	INC	61,331	40.93	10,123
74	Rangapara	Krishna Kamal Tanti	BJP	70,172	53.20	Abhijit Hazarika	INC	47,827	36.26	22,345
75	Sootea	Padma Hazarika	BJP	84,807	56.50	Praneswar Basumatary	INC	60,432	40.26	24,375
Biswanath District
76	Biswanath	Promod Borthakur	BJP	71,201	50.80	Anjan Borah	INC	61,991	44.23	9,210
77	Behali	Ranjit Dutta	BJP	53,583	50.93	Jayanta Borah	IND	23,744	22.57	29,839
Sonitpur District
78	Gohpur	Utpal Borah	BJP	93,224	57.14	Ripun Bora	INC	63,930	39.18	29,294
Morigaon District
79	Jagiroad (SC)	Pijush Hazarika	BJP	106,643	53.54	Swapan Kumar Mandal	INC	77,239	38.78	29,404
80	Marigaon	Rama Kanta Dewri	BJP	81,657	52.15	Bani Kanta Das	AJP	45,125	28.82	36,532
81	Laharighat	Dr. Asif Mohammad Nazar	INC	60,932	37.30	Siddique Ahmed	IND	58,904	36.06	2,028
Nagaon District
82	Raha (SC)	Sashi Kanta Das	INC	89,511	50.05	Bishnu Das	AGP	76,453	42.75	13,058
83	Dhing	Aminul Islam	AIUDF	145,888	70.39	Mehboob Muktar	IND	42,921	20.71	102,947
84	Batadroba	Sibamoni Bora	INC	84,278	60.02	Angoorlata Deka	BJP	51,458	36.64	32,820
85	Rupohihat	Nurul Huda	INC	132,091	73.00	Najir Hussain	BJP	25,739	14.22	106,352
86	Nowgong	Rupak Sarmah	BJP	81,098	52.01	Santanu Sarma	INC	70,015	44.90	11,083
87	Barhampur	Jitu Goswami	BJP	70,111	48.70	Suresh Borah	INC	69,360	48.18	751
88	Samaguri	Rakibul Hussain	INC	81,123	58.09	Anil Saikia	BJP	55,025	39.40	26,098
89	Kaliabor	Keshab Mahanta	AGP	73,677	59.06	Prasanta Kumar Saikia	INC	44,957	36.04	28,720
Hojai District
90	Jamunamukh	Sirajuddin Ajmal	AIUDF	136,902	73.14	Sadik Ullah Bhuyan	AGP	18,342	9.80	118,560
91	Hojai	Ramkrishna Ghosh	BJP	125,790	56.64	Debabrata Saha	INC	92,008	41.43	33,782
92	Lumding	Sibu Misra	BJP	89,108	51.04	Swapan Kar	INC	77,377	44.32	11,731
Golaghat District
93	Bokakhat	Atul Bora	AGP	72,930	60.56	Pranab Doley	IND	27,749	23.04	45,181
94	Sarupathar	Biswajit Phukan	BJP	107,090	51.49	Roselina Tirkey	INC	67,731	32.57	39,359
95	Golaghat	Ajanta Neog	BJP	81,651	50.63	Bitupan Saikia	INC	72,326	44.84	9,325
96	Khumtai	Mrinal Saikia	BJP	65,655	56.49	Bismita Gogoi	INC	38,522	33.14	27,133
97	Dergaon (SC)	Bhabendra Nath Bharali	AGP	64,043	48.12	Bani Hazarika	INC	51,546	38.73	12,497
Jorhat District
98	Jorhat	Hitendra Nath Goswami	BJP	68,321	48.84	Rana Goswami	INC	61,833	44.20	6,488
Majuli District
99	Majuli (ST)	Sarbananda Sonowal	BJP	71,436	67.53	Rajib Lochan Pegu	INC	28,244	26.70	43,192
Jorhat District
100	Titabar	Bhaskar Jyoti Baruah	INC	64,303	52.89	Hemanta Kalita	BJP	50,924	41.89	13,397
101	Mariani	Rupjyoti Kurmi	INC	47,308	49.36	Ramani Tanti	BJP	44,862	46.81	2,446
102	Teok	Renupoma Rajkhowa	AGP	47,555	45.78	Pallabi Gogoi	INC	46,205	44.48	1,350
Sibsagar District
103	Amguri	Prodip Hazarika	AGP	49,891	48.03	Angkita Dutta	INC	43,712	42.08	6,179
104	Nazira	Debabrata Saikia	INC	52,387	47.56	Mayur Borgohain	BJP	51,704	46.94	683
Charaideo District
105	Mahmara	Jogen Mohan	BJP	51,282	45.18	Suruj Dehingia	INC	38,147	33.61	13,135
106	Sonari	Dharmeswar Konwar	BJP	69,690	48.00	Sushil Kumar Suri	INC	54,573	37.59	15,117
Sibsagar District
107	Thowra	Sushanta Borgohain	INC	48,026	49.56	Kushal Dowari	BJP	46,020	47.49	2,006
108	Sibsagar	Akhil Gogoi (Note: Akhil Gogoi is the president of Raijor Dal, but he contested the election as an independent candidate.)	IND	57,219	46.06	Surabhi Rajkonwari	BJP	45,344	36.50	11,875
Lakhimpur District
109	Bihpuria	Amiya Kumar Bhuyan	BJP	58,979	48.53	Bhupen Kumar Borah	INC	48,801	40.16	10,178
110	Naoboicha	Bharat Chandra Narah	INC	52,905	27.34	Ajijur Rahman	IND	49,292	25.47	3,613
111	Lakhimpur	Manab Deka	BJP	70,387	45.03	Dr. Joy Prakash Das	INC	67,351	43.09	3,036
112	Dhakuakhana (ST)	Naba Kumar Doley	BJP	86,382	50.83	Padmalochan Doley	INC	76,786	45.18	9,596
Dhemaji District
113	Dhemaji (ST)	Ranoj Pegu	BJP	87,681	45.33	Chittaranjan Basumatary	AJP	56,889	29.41	30,792
114	Jonai (ST)	Bhubon Pegu	BJP	168,411	68.69	Hema Hari Prasanna Pegu	INC	57,424	23.42	110,987
Dibrugarh District
115	Moran	Chakradhar Gogoi	BJP	55,604	49.68	Pranjal Ghatowar	INC	33,263	29.72	22,341
116	Dibrugarh	Prasanta Phukan	BJP	68,762	60.44	Rajkumar Nilanetra Neog	INC	30,757	27.03	38,005
117	Lahowal	Binod Hazarika	BJP	59,295	48.13	Manoj Dhanowar	INC	42,047	34.13	17,248
118	Duliajan	Terash Gowalla	BJP	54,762	43.35	Dhruba Gogoi	INC	46,652	36.08	8,110
119	Tingkhong	Bimal Borah	BJP	62,675	52.66	Etuwa Munda	INC	34,282	28.80	28,394
120	Naharkatia	Taranga Gogoi	BJP	47,268	42.57	Pranati Phukan	INC	32,292	29.08	14,976
121	Chabua	Ponakan Baruah	AGP	53,554	41.40	Ajoy Phukan	INC	34,824	26.92	18,730
Tinsukia District
122	Tinsukia	Sanjoy Kishan	BJP	85,857	65.58	Shamsher Singh	AJP	15,060	11.50	70,797
123	Digboi	Suren Phukan	BJP	59,217	55.24	Shibanath Chetia	INC	32,241	30.80	26,976
124	Margherita	Bhaskar Sharma	BJP	86,640	56.52	Manoranjan Borgohain	INC	28,140	18.36	58,500
125	Doomdooma	Rupesh Gowala	BJP	49,119	41.72	Durga Bhumij	INC	40,981	34.80	8,138
126	Sadiya	Bolin Chetia	BJP	64,855	45.49	Lakhin Chandra Chetia	INC	42,771	30.00	22,084

== Aftermath ==
Soon after the election results were declared and the BJP led NDA emerged victorious, it faced the dilemma of who they should make the Chief Minister. While most of the top leaders in the BJP state unit favored incumbent Chief Minister Sarbananda Sonowal, speculations suggested that Himanta Biswa Sarma had more number of elected MLAs of the BJP on his side. Due to prolonged discontent between the two leaders, a BJP legislature party meeting could not be called.

Due to the post poll violence in West Bengal, the BJP top brass delayed decision regarding the chief ministership issue it faced in Assam. After six days of declaration of the results, the BJP central leadership on 8 May called both the leaders to New Delhi to sort out the differences and prevent a factionalism within the party. It held a meeting at BJP national president JP Nadda's house where Home Minister Amit Shah was also present. They met with Sonowal and Himanta separately first and then held another meeting where both of them were present. The meetings lasted for over four hours. At the end, they left the place and told reporters that the a BJP legislature party meeting will be held the day after, where the name of the next Chief Minister will be announced.

The next day Sarbananda Sonowal tendered his resignation letter to Governor Jagdish Mukhi at his residence. In the Library Planetarium in Guwahati, the BJP legislative party meeting was constituted where Sarbananda Sonowal himself proposed the name of Dr. Himanta Biswa Sarma for Chief Minister and he was unanimously elected as the head of the BJP legislative party. Then in the evening, Himanta Biswa Sarma met the Governor at the latter's residence and showed him the letter of support of his MLAs and sought claim to form the next government. The Governor appointed him as Chief Minister-elect and announced that he would take oath on 10 May, Monday.

The next day at Sankardev Kalakhetra in Guwahati, Himanta Biswa Sarma took oath as the 15th Chief Minister of Assam. Along with him 13 other MLAs of the NDA coalition also took oath as ministers in his cabinet.

== Bypolls ==
On 28 September 2021, the Election Commission of India announced the dates of the by-election to five assembly constituencies of Assam to be held on 30 October and the results will be counted on 2 November.

By-polls to 'Gossaigaon' and 'Tamulpur' have been necessitated due to the death of the sitting MLAs, while the incumbents of 'Bhapanipur', 'Mariani' and 'Thowra' resigned to join the ruling BJP.

On 10 February 2022, the Election Commission of India announced the date of By-election to Majuli Assembly constituency of Assam to be held on 7 March and the results will be counted on 10 March. By-polls to Majuli constituency have been necessitated as the seat was vacated by Union Minister for Shipping, Ports and AYUSH Sarbananda Sonowal who was elected unopposed to the Rajya Sabha on 27 September 2021.

On 15 October 2024, the Election Commission of India announced the date of By-election to five assembly constituencies of Assam to be held on 13 November 2024 and the results will be counted on 23 November 2024. By-polls to all the five constituencies have been necessitated as all the incumbent MLAs contested the elections to the Lok Sabha earlier this year and got elected.

=== Candidates ===
Assembly constituency		NDA		INC	AIUDF	BPF	AJP	Voting phase/date
No.	Name	Party	Candidate	Candidate	Candidate	Candidate	Candidate	Voting phase/date
28	Gossaigaon	UPPL	Jiron Basumatary	Jowel Tudu	Khairul Anam Khandakar	Dhruba Kumar Brahma Narzary		30-10-2021
41	Bhabanipur	BJP	Phanidhar Talukdar	Sailendra Nath Das	Jubbar Ali			30-10-2021
58	Tamulpur	UPPL	Jolen Daimary	Bhaskar Dahal				30-10-2021
101	Mariani	BJP	Rupjyoti Kurmi	Luhit Konwar				30-10-2021
107	Thowra	BJP	Sushanta Borgohain	Monoranjan Konwar				30-10-2021
99	Majuli (ST)	BJP	Bhuban Gam				Chittaranjan Basumatary	07-03-2022
11	Dholai (SC)	BJP	Nihar Ranjan Das	Dhrubajyoti Purkayastha				13-11-2024
31	Sidli (ST)	UPPL	Nirmal Kumar Brahma	Sanjib Warie		Suddho Kumar Basumatary		13-11-2024
32	Bongaigaon	AGP	Diptimayee Choudhury	Brajenjit Singha				13-11-2024
77	Behali	BJP	Diganta Ghatowal	Jayanta Borah				13-11-2024
88	Samaguri	BJP	Diplu Ranjan Sarmah	Tanzil Hussain				13-11-2024

=== Results ===
Assembly constituency		Winner				Runner-up				Margin	Voting on
No.	Name	Candidate	Party	Votes	%	Candidate	Party	Votes	%	Margin	Voting on
28	Gossaigaon	Jiron Basumatary	UPPL	58,769	39.64	Jowel Tudu	INC	30,517	20.58	28,252	30.10.2021
41	Bhabanipur	Phanidhar Talukdar	BJP	64,200	56.41	Sailendra Nath Das	INC	38,559	33.88	25,641	30.10.2021
58	Tamulpur	Jolen Daimary	UPPL	86,678	59.62	Ganesh Kachary	IND	29,619	20.37	57,059	30.10.2021
101	Mariani	Rupjyoti Kurmi	BJP	55,489	62.38	Luhit Konwar	INC	15,385	17.30	40,104	30.10.2021
107	Thowra	Sushanta Borgohain	BJP	54,956	61.99	Dhaijya Konwar	IND	24,395	27.52	30,561	30.10.2021
99	Majuli (ST)	Bhuban Gam	BJP	67,242	69.86	Chittaranjan Basumatary	AJP	25,101	26.08	42,141	7 March 2022
11	Dholai (SC)	Nihar Ranjan Das	BJP	69,945	49.49	Dhrubajyoti Purkayastha	INC	60,847	43.05	9,098	13.11.2024
31	Sidli (ST)	Nirmal Kumar Brahma	UPPL	95,243	57.8	Suddho Kumar Basumatary	BPF	58,227	35.34	37,016	13.11.2024
32	Bongaigaon	Diptimayee Choudhury	AGP	74,734	52.4	Brajenjit Singha	INC	39,570	27.75	35,164	13.11.2024
77	Behali	Diganta Ghatowal	BJP	50,947	50.61	Jayanta Borah	INC	41,896	41.62	9,051	13.11.2024
88	Samaguri	Diplu Ranjan Sarmah	BJP	81,321	56.94	Tanzil Hussain	INC	56,820	39.78	24,501	13.11.2024

== See also ==
- 2022 Assam municipal elections
- 2024 Indian general election in Assam
- 2025 Assam Panchayat Election
