= List of by-elections to the Assam Legislative Assembly =

The following is a list of by-elections held for the Assam Legislative Assembly, India, since its formation in 1947.

== 13th Assembly ==
=== 2013 ===
S.No	Date	Constituency	MLA before election	Party before election	Elected MLA	Party after election
8	24 February 2013	Algapur	Sahidul Alam Chodhary	Asom Gana Parishad	Mandira Roy	Indian National Congress

=== 2014 ===
S.No	Date	Constituency	MLA before election	Party before election	Elected MLA	Party after election
1	13 September 2014	Silchar	Sushmita Dev	Indian National Congress	Dilip Kumar Paul	Bharatiya Janata Party
2	13 September 2014	Lakhipur	Dinesh Prasad Goala	Indian National Congress	Rajdeep Goala	Indian National Congress
3	13 September 2014	Jamunamukh	Sirajuddin Ajmal	All India United Democratic Front	Abdur Rahim Ajmal	All India United Democratic Front

== 14th Assembly ==
=== 2016 ===
S.No	Date	Constituency	MLA before election	Party before election	Elected MLA	Party after election
1	19 November 2016	Baithalangso	Mansing Rongpi	Indian National Congress	Mansing Rongpi	Bharatiya Janata Party

=== 2017 ===
S.No	Date	Constituency	MLA before election	Party before election	Elected MLA	Party after election
113	9 April 2017	Dhemaji	Pradan Baruah	Bharatiya Janata Party	Ranoj Pegu	Bharatiya Janata Party

=== 2019 ===
S.No	Date	Constituency	MLA before election	Party before election	Elected MLA	Party after election
1	21 October 2019	Ratabari	Kripanath Mallah	Bharatiya Janata Party	Bijoy Malakar	Bharatiya Janata Party
2	21 October 2019	Rangapara	Pallab Lochan Das	Bharatiya Janata Party	Rajen Borthakur	Bharatiya Janata Party
3	21 October 2019	Sonari	Topon Kumar Gogoi	Bharatiya Janata Party	Nabanita Handique	Bharatiya Janata Party
4	21 October 2019	Jania	Abdul Khaleque	Indian National Congress	Rafiqul Islam	All India United Democratic Front

== 15th Assembly ==
=== 2021 ===
S.No	Date	Constituency	MLA before election	Party before election	Elected MLA	Party after election
28	30 October 2021	Gossaigaon	Majendra Narzary	Bodoland People's Front	Jiron Basumatary	United People's Party Liberal
41	30 October 2021	Bhabanipur	Phanidhar Talukdar	All India United Democratic Front	Phanidhar Talukdar	Bharatiya Janata Party
58	30 October 2021	Tamulpur	Leho Ram Boro	United People's Party Liberal	Jolen Daimary	United People's Party Liberal
101	30 October 2021	Mariani	Rupjyoti Kurmi	Indian National Congress	Rupjyoti Kurmi	Bharatiya Janata Party
107	30 October 2021	Thowra	Sushanta Borgohain	Indian National Congress	Sushanta Borgohain	Bharatiya Janata Party

=== 2022 ===
Date	S.No	Constituency	MLA before election	Party before election	Elected MLA	Party after election
7 March 2022	99	Majuli	Sarbananda Sonowal	Bharatiya Janata Party	Bhuban Gam	Bharatiya Janata Party

=== 2024 ===
Date	Constituency		Previous MLA		Reason	Elected MLA	
13 November 2024	11	Dholai	Parimal Suklabaidya	Bharatiya Janata Party	Elected to Lok Sabha on 4 June 2024	Nihar Ranjan Das	Bharatiya Janata Party
13 November 2024	31	Sidli	Joyanta Basumatary	United People's Party Liberal	Elected to Lok Sabha on 4 June 2024	Nirmal Kumar Brahma	United People's Party Liberal
13 November 2024	32	Bongaigaon	Phani Bhusan Choudhury	Asom Gana Parishad	Elected to Lok Sabha on 4 June 2024	Diptimayee Choudhury	Asom Gana Parishad
13 November 2024	77	Behali	Ranjit Dutta	Bharatiya Janata Party	Elected to Lok Sabha on 4 June 2024	Diganta Ghatowal	Bharatiya Janata Party
13 November 2024	88	Samaguri	Rakibul Hussain	Indian National Congress	Elected to Lok Sabha on 4 June 2024	Diplu Ranjan Sarmah	Bharatiya Janata Party
