= Bhabanipur, Assam Assembly constituency =

Assembly constituency of Assam

Coordinates: 26.35°N 91.45°E

Bhabanipur
- Former constituency No. 41 for the Assam Legislative Assembly

Constituency details
- Country: India
- Region: Northeast India
- State: Assam
- Division: Lower Assam
- District: Bajali
- Lok Sabha constituency: Kokrajhar
- Established: 1962
- Abolished: 2023
- Reservation: None

Bhabanipur Assembly constituency was one of the 126 assembly constituencies of the Assam Legislative Assembly in India. Bhabanipur formed part of Kokrajhar Lok Sabha constituency. There is an assembly segment by the same name in West Bengal Vidhan Sabha as well.

This constituency was abolished in 2023.

== Town details ==
- Country: India.
- State: Assam.
- District: Bajali district.
- Lok Sabha Constituency: Kokrajhar Lok Sabha/Parliamentary constituency.
- Assembly Categorisation: Rural
- Literacy Level: 79%.
- Eligible Electors as per 2021 General Elections: 1,17,396 Eligible Electors. Male Electors:75,355 . Female Electors: 72,693.
- Geographic Co-Ordinates: 26°31'21.7"N 91°04'48.4"E..
- Total Area Covered: 378 square kilometres.
- Area Includes: Bhabanipur mouza in Barpeta thana; Bijni mouza in Sorbhog thana; and Hastinapur mouza in Patacharkuchithana, in Barpeta sub-division, of Bajali district of Assam.
- Inter State Border : Bajali.
- Number Of Polling Stations: Year 2011-167, Year 2016-169, Year 2021-41.

== Members of Vidhan Sabha ==
Following is the list of past members representing Bihpuria Assembly constituency in Assam Legislature.

- 1962: Mahadeb Das, Indian National Congress.
- 1967: D. Choudhary, Indian National Congress.
- 1972: Ghana Kanta Baro, Revolutionary Communist Party of India.
- 1978: Tarini Charan Das, Janata Party.
- 1983: Mir Abdul Halim, Indian National Congress.
- 1985: Surendra Medhi, Independent.
- 1991: Milan Boro, Independent.
- 1996: Surendra Medhi, Asom Gana Parishad.
- 1998: Binod Gayari.
- 2000: Dr. Manoranjan Das, Asom Gana Parishad.
- 2001: Sarbananda Choudhury, Indian National Congress.
- 2006: Dr. Manoranjan Das, Asom Gana Parishad.
- 2011: Abul Kalam Azad, All India United Democratic Front.
- 2016: Abul Kalam Azad, All India United Democratic Front.
- 2021: Phanidhar Talukdar, All India United Democratic Front.

Election	Name	Party
2021 (by-polls)	Phanidhar Talukdar	Bharatiya Janata Party

== Election results ==
=== 2021 by-election ===
2021 Assam Legislative Assembly By-Election: Bhabanipur
Party	Candidate	Votes	%	±%
BJP	Phanidhar Talukdar	64,200	56.41	New
INC	Sailendra Nath Das	38,559	33.58	New
AIUDF	Jubbar Ali	6,430	5.65	−38.92
NOTA	None of the above	1,120	0.98	−0.15
Majority		25,651	22.83	
Turnout		1,13,806		
BJP gain from AIUDF		Swing		

=== 2021 ===
2021 Assam Legislative Assembly election: Bhabanipur
Party	Candidate	Votes	%	±%
AIUDF	Phanidhar Talukdar	55,546	44.57	
AGP	Dr. Ranjit Deka, Ph.D	52,748	42	
Independent	Abul Kalam Azad	5,400		
Independent	Kamal Kumar Medhi	3,217		
Independent	Binoy Kherkatary	1,594		
Independent	Ruhul Amin	1,434		
Independent	Makhan Swargiary	1,358		
NOTA	None of the above	1037	0.83	
Majority		2,439	2.21	
Turnout		125603	84.32	
Registered electors		148,961		
AIUDF hold		Swing		

=== 2016 ===
2016 Assam Legislative Assembly election: Bhabanipur
Party	Candidate	Votes	%	±%
AIUDF	Abul Kalam Azad	28,383	25.73	
Independent	Phanidhar Talukdar	25,944	23.52	
BJP	Manoj Baruah	22,380	20.29	
Independent	Milan Baro	14,500	13.14	
Independent	Kanak Baro	8,748	7.93	
INC	Rajib Das	6,620	6.00	
NOTA	None of the above	706	0.64	
Majority		2,439	2.21	
Turnout		1,10,280	86.60	
Registered electors		1,27,341		
AIUDF hold		Swing		

=== 2011 ===
- Abul Kalam Azad (AIUDF): 24,756 votes
- Phanidhar Talukdar (IND): 19,714 votes
