= Samsul Huda =

Indian politician

Member of Assam Legislative Assembly
- In office 21 May 2021 – 2023
- Preceded by: Ashok Kumar Singhi
- Succeeded by: Constituency abolished
- Constituency: Bilasipara East

Personal details
- Party: All India United Democratic Front

Samsul Huda is an All India United Democratic Front politician from Assam. He was elected to the Assam Legislative Assembly from Bilasipara East in the 2021 Assam Legislative Assembly election.
