= Bhupen Baro =

Indian politician

Member of Assam Legislative Assembly
- Incumbent
- Assumed office 21 May 2021
- Preceded by: Maneswar Brahma
- Constituency: Barama (Vidhan Sabha constituency)

Personal details
- Party: United People's Party Liberal
- Profession: Politician

Bhupen Baro is an Indian politician and member of United People's Party, Liberal from Assam. He is an MLA, elected from the Barama constituency in the 2021 Assam Legislative Assembly election.
