= Abdur Rashid Mandal =

Indian politician

Member of Assam Legislative Assembly
- Incumbent
- Assumed office 2016
- Preceded by: Sheikh Shah Alam
- Constituency: Goalpara West
- In office 2006–2011
- Preceded by: Sheikh Shah Alam
- Succeeded by: Sheikh Shah Alam
- Constituency: Goalpara West

Personal details
- Born: Abdur Rashid Mandal
- Party: Indian National Congress

Abdur Rashid Mandal is an Indian politician from Assam. He was elected to the Assam Legislative Assembly from Goalpara West in the 2016 and 2021 Assam Legislative Assembly election as a member of the Indian National Congress. He previously served from 2006 to 2011.
