= Gul Akhtara Begum =

Indian politician

MLA of Bilasipara East Vidhan Sabha Constituency
- In office 2011–2016
- Preceded by: Proshanta Kumar Baruah
- Succeeded by: Ashok Kumar Singhi

Personal details
- Party: Indian National Congress

Gul Akhtara Begum is an Indian politician from Assam. In 2011 she was elected as MLA of Bilasipara East Vidhan Sabha Constituency in Assam Legislative Assembly. She contested the election on the ticket of All India United Democratic Front. She joined Indian National Congress in 2016.
