= Rameswar Dhanowar =

Indian politician

Minister for Excise, Labour and Employment
- In office 18 May 2001 – 2005
- Chief Minister: Tarun Gogoi

Minister of Labour and Employment
- In office 28 February 1983 – 23 December 1985
- Chief Minister: Hiteswar Saikia

Member of Assam Legislative Assembly
- In office 21 March 1978 – 19 May 2016
- Preceded by: Chandra Bahadur Chetri
- Succeeded by: Suren Phukan
- Constituency: Digboi

Personal details
- Born: 14 July 1939 Dobba Tiniali, Sibsagar
- Died: 10 July 2017 (aged 77)
- Party: Indian National Congress
- Spouse: Rani Dhanowar (m. 1967)
- Children: 5
- Parent: Jethua Dhanowar (Father) Umee Dhanowar (Mother)
- Education: Gauhati University

Rameswar Dhanowar (14 July 1939 – 10 July 2017) was an Indian politician from the state of Assam. He was a Member of the Assam Legislative Assembly for Digboi and represented the Indian National Congress. He was a minister in Hiteswar Saikia and Tarun Gogoi’s cabinet.

== Early life and education ==
Rameswar Dhanowar was born on 14 July 1939 to Jethua Dhanowar and Umee Dhanowar in Sibsagar. He received a B.A. from Guwahati University in 1964.

== Political career ==
Dhanowar was the Indian National Congress candidate for the constituency of Digboi in the 1978 Assam Legislative Assembly Election. He obtained 10312 votes, 32.66% of the total vote. He defeated his nearest opponent by 67 votes. Dhanowar sought reelection in the 1983 Assam Legislative Assembly election. He received 6530 votes, 72.23% of the total vote and he defeated his nearest opponent by 4643 votes. He was made minister of Labour and Employment in the Hiteswar Saikia Cabinet. In the 1985 Assam Legislative Assembly election, Dhanowar sought reelection in Digboi. He received 27438 votes, 58.54% of the total vote. He defeated his nearest opponent by 15108 votes. In the 1991 Assam Legislative Assembly election, he sought reelection. He received 33799 votes, 63.75% of the total vote. He defeated his nearest opponent by 22745 votes. In the 1996 Assam Legislative Assembly election he was reelected by a margin of 26969 votes. In 2001 he was reelected again by a margin of 17654 votes. He was made minister for Excise, Labour and Employment in the first Tarun Gogoi cabinet.

In the 2006 Assam Legislative Assembly election, Dhanowar received 35773 votes, defeating his nearest opponent by 12735 votes and was reelected. In the 2011 Assam Legislative Assembly election. He received 38663 votes, 50.04% of the total vote. He defeated his nearest opponent by 10758 votes and was reelected. He did not seek reelection in 2016, after being MLA for 38 years. His son was the Congress candidate but lost.

== Personal life ==
He married Rani Dhanowar on 27 April 1967 and they had three sons and two daughters. His son, Gautam Dhanowar, was the Indian National Congress candidate for Digboi in 2016 but lost. His son resigned from the Indian National Congress after being denied the 2021 ticket for Digboi and he later joined BJP. Another of his sons, Manoj, contested the 2019 Lok Sabha elections for Dibrugarh but lost and contested the 2021 Assam Legislative Assembly election for Lahowal but again lost. Manoj Dhanowar later resigned from the Indian National Congress.

== Death ==
On 10 July 2021, Dhanowar died at the age of 77 after a prolonged illness.

== Positions held ==
- 1978: Member, Assam Legislative Assembly
- 1983: Member, Assam Legislative Assembly
- 1983: Cabinet Minister, Government of Assam
- 1985: Member, Assam Legislative Assembly
- 1991: Member, Assam Legislative Assembly
- 1996: Member, Assam Legislative Assembly
- 2001: Member, Assam Legislative Assembly
- 2001: Cabinet Minister, Government of Assam
- 2006: Member, Assam Legislative Assembly
- 2011: Member, Assam Legislative Assembly
