= 2025 Assam local elections =

Indian election

2025 Assam Panchayat Election
- 2 and 7 May 2025

397 ZPM and 2188 APM posts (Note: ZPM - Zilla Parishad Members | APM - Anchalik Panchayat Members)
- Turnout: 74.71 (▼3.49 pp)
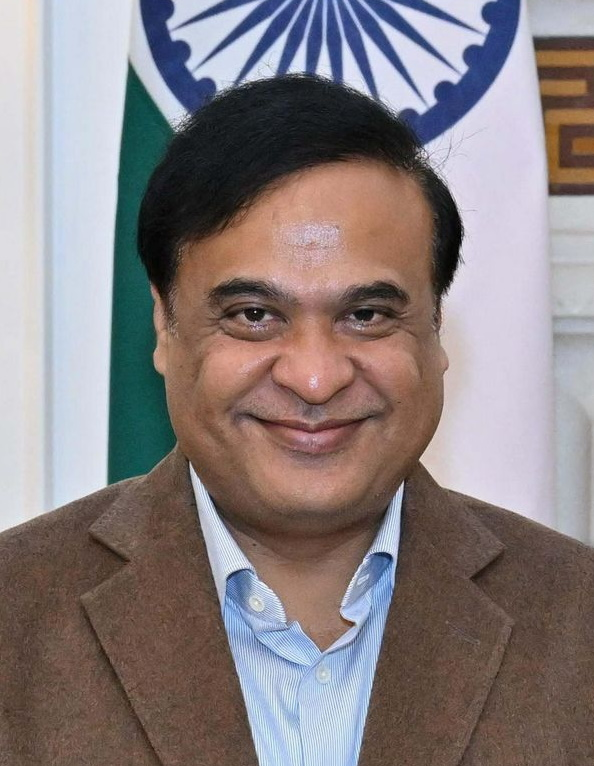

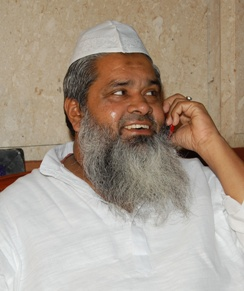

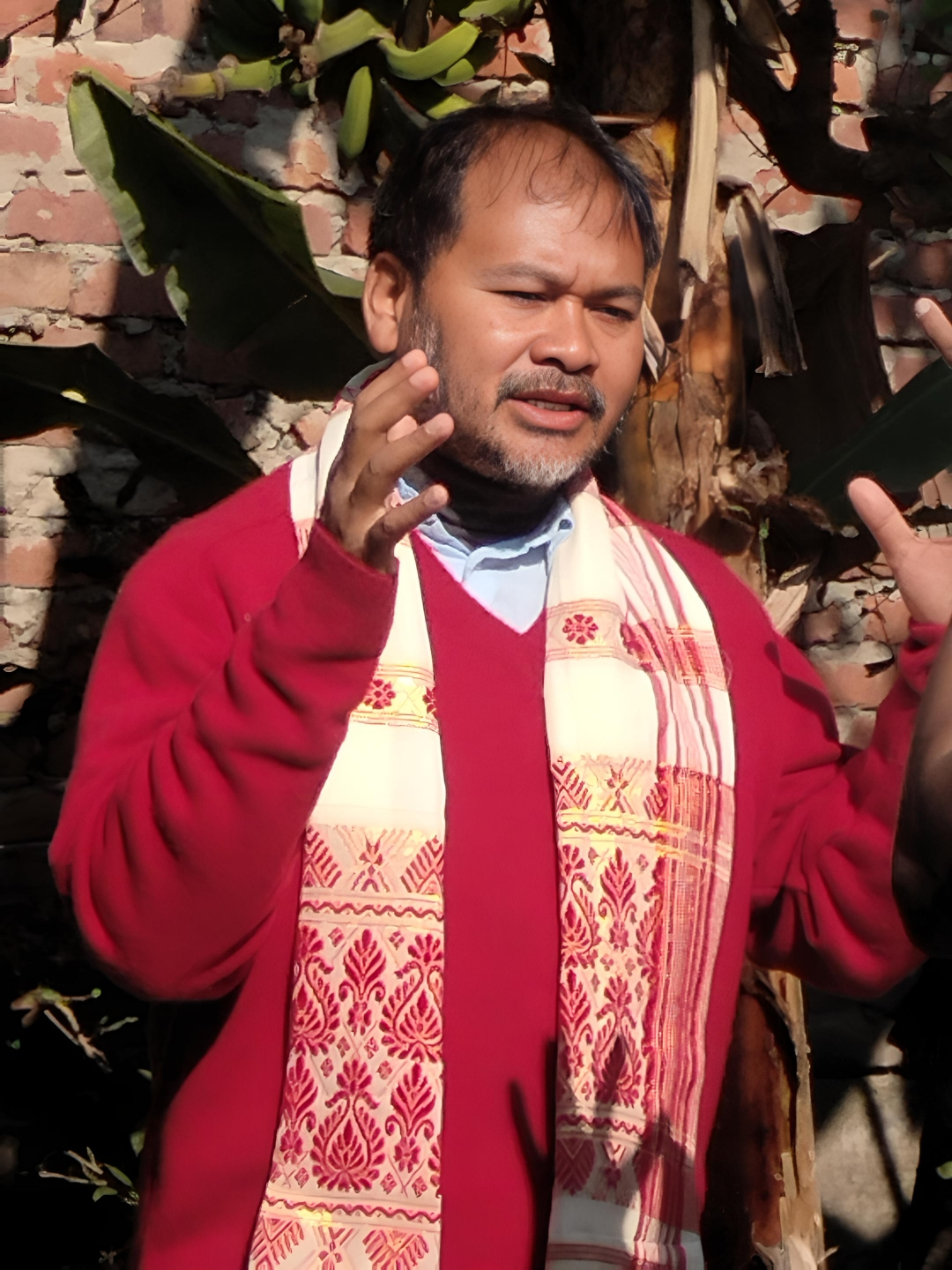

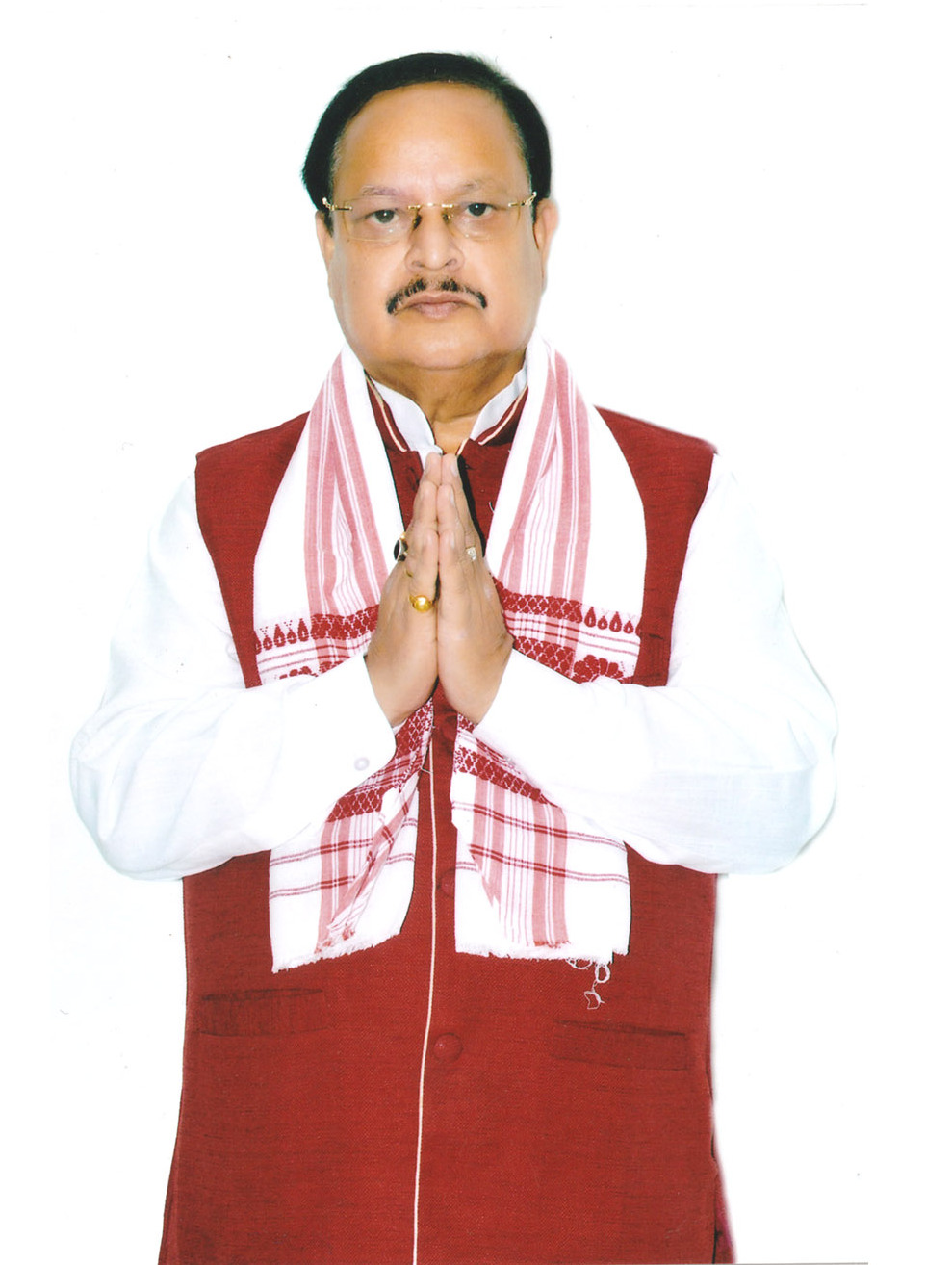
	First party	Second party	Third party
Leader	Himanta Biswa Sarma	Bhupen Borah	Badruddin Ajmal
Party	NDA (Note: BJP and AGP)	INC	AIUDF
Leader since	2021	2021	2005
Last election (ZPM)	212	147	26
Seats won (ZPM)	301 (Note: BJP - 274 | AGP - 27)	72	8
Seat change (ZPM)	▲89	▼75	▼18
Last election (APM)	1025	771	139
Seats won (APM)	1445 (Note: BJP - 1261 | AGP - 184)	481	64
Seat change (APM)	▲420	▼290	▼75
	Fourth party	Fifth party	Sixth party
Leader	Akhil Gogoi	Romen Chandra Borthakur	Lurinjyoti Gogoi
Party	RD	AITC	AJP
Leader since	2020	2024	2020
Last election (ZPM)	Didn't exist	Didn't contest	Didn't exist
Seats won (ZPM)	3	0	0
Seat change (ZPM)	New	—	New
Last election (APM)	Didn't exist	Didn't contest	Didn't exist
Seats won (APM)	17	4	3
Seat change (APM)	New	—	New
	Seventh party
Leader	Bhaben Choudhury
Party	AAP
Leader since	2025
Last election (ZPM)	Didn't contest
Seats won (ZPM)	0
Seat change (ZPM)	—
Last election (APM)	Didn't contest
Seats won (APM)	1
Seat change (APM)	—

The 2025 Assam Panchayat Election were held in May 2025. Polling took place in two phases, on 2 and 7 May 2025. The counting of votes started on 11 May and results were declared on 14 May. More than 18 million people were eligible to vote and the voter turnout was over 74 per cent.

The National Democratic Alliance of Bharatiya Janata Party and Asom Gana Parishad, who also formed the state government, won absolute majorities in both ZPM and APM respectively. Both the parties together won 301 seats in Zilla Parishad (ZPM) and 1,445 seats in Anchalik Parishad (APM). Meanwhile, Indian National Congress suffered a crushing defeat and only manages to won 72 seats and 481 seats in ZPM and APM respectively. On the other hand, AIUDF despite being the prime option in minority predominant areas, also suffered a major setback in these areas and only manages to won 8 seats and 64 seats in ZPM and APM respectively. While Akhil Gogoi lead Raijor Dal in their first ever Panchayat election, won 3 seats and 17 seats in ZPM and APM respectively.

== Background ==
Assam Panchayat Raj Act, 1994 made provisions for establishing a three-tier Panchayati Raj system in the State at the village, intermediate and district level.

The Assam Panchayat (Amendment) Act, 2023 made provisions for introduction of political symbols in ZPM and APM, while no party symbols for candidates contesting in Gaon Panchayat.

Election was supposed to take place in 2023, but after a long delay of two years, it finally took place in May 2025. The delay was basically due to a High Court's verdict regarding delimitation exercise in Sribhumi district and Assam Higher Secondary exams taking place in February/March 2025.

Total Number of Electors

No.	Gender	Voters
1.	Male	90,60,640
2.	Female	89,53,865
3.	Others	408
	Total electors	1,80,14,913

Total Number of Elected Representatives in the State

No.	Panchayat	Representatives
1.	Zilla Parishad (ZPM)	397
2.	Anchalik Panchayats (APM)	2,188
3.	Gaon Panchayats	21,920

== Election schedule ==
The Assam State Election Commission announced that the Polls would hold in two Phases. The polling for the first phase was held on 2 May 2025, while that for the second phase took place on 7 May 2025. The final counting of votes to start from 11 May 2025 in the 27 districts across the state.

In first phase, polls were held in Cachar, Hailakandi, Sribhumi, Biswanath, Tinsukia, Dibrugarh, Charaideo, Sivasagar, Majuli, Jorhat, Golaghat, Dhemaji, Lakhimpur and Sonitpur.

In the second phase, the election were held in Dhubri, South Salmara Mankachar, Goalpara, Bongaigaon, Barpeta, Bajali, Nalbari, Kamrup, Kamrup (Metro), Hojai, Nagaon, Morigaon and Darrang.

== Parties and alliances ==
Party			Symbol	Leader
National Democratic Alliance	Bharatiya Janata Party	BJP		Dilip Saikia
National Democratic Alliance	Asom Gana Parishad	AGP		Atul Bora
Indian National Congress		INC		Bhupen Borah
All India United Democratic Front		AIUDF		Badruddin Ajmal
Raijor Dal		RD		Akhil Gogoi
All India Trinamool Congress		AITC		Romen Chandra Borthakur
Assam Jatiya Parishad		AJP		Lurinjyoti Gogoi
Aam Aadmi Party		AAP		Bhaben Choudhury
Communist Party of India (Marxist)		CPI(M)		Suprakash Talukdar
United People's Party, Liberal		UPPL		Pramod Boro
Bodoland People's Front		BPF		Hagrama Mohilary
Samajwadi Party		SP		Brojen Kumar Handique

== Campaign ==
CM of Assam, Himanta Biswa Sarma during his election campaign requested for a triple-engine govt. He also vowed to reduce lpg prices, slash electric bill, granting land rights to tea tribes, etc. The president of Asom Gana Parishad, Atul Bora, whose party is in coalition with the BJP, expressed complete confidence of a comfortable victory and also claimed that the opposition Congress has no existence in this election. The president of the Assam unit of BJP, Dilip Saikia claimed that current BJP govt launched various schemes in a corruption-free manner unlike previous Congress-led government being marked by various corruption and nepotism. Meanwhile Congress MP Gaurav Gogoi vowed to give priority to Underprivileged and marginalised sections of the society along with youth and women empowerment. Gogoi also alleged that the current government decision to open liquor shops in rural areas is creating an unhealthy environment in those areas. The president of the Assam unit of Congress, Bhupen Borah alleged that their candidates were being threatened by the current NDA-govt. to withdraw from the polls.

== Party wise results ==
=== Zilla Parishad ===
The election results for 397 Zilla Parishad Members (ZPM) are as follows:

No.	Political Party	Seats won	Seat share (in %)	Seat change
1.	National Democratic Alliance	301	75.82	▲89
2.	Indian National Congress	72	18.14	▼75
3.	All India United Democratic Front	8	2.01	▼18
4.	Raijor Dal	3	0.76	New
5.	Independent	13	3.27	—

=== Anchalik Panchayat ===
The election results for 2,188 Anchalik Panchayat Members (APM) are as follows:

No.	Political Party	Seats won	Seat share (in %)	Seat change
1.	National Democratic Alliance	1,445	66.04	▲420
2.	Indian National Congress	481	21.98	▼290
3.	All India United Democratic Front	64	2.92	▼75
4.	Raijor Dal	17	0.78	New
5.	Trinamool Congress	4	0.18	—
6.	Assam Jatiya Parishad	3	0.14	New
7.	Aam Aadmi Party	1	0.05	—
8.	Independent	173	7.91	—

== District wise results ==
=== Zilla Parishad (ZPM) ===
S.No.	District	Total	NDA	INC	AIUDF	RD	IND
1	Nagaon	27	14	13	0	0	0
2	Cachar	25	16	7	0	0	2
3	Kamrup Rural	24	19	4	1	0	0
4	Dibrugarh	22	22	0	0	0	0
5	Tinsukia	22	22	0	0	0	0
6	Dhubri	20	5	10	3	1	1
7	Golaghat	20	20	0	0	0	0
8	Sonitpur	20	20	0	0	0	0
9	Barpeta	19	7	9	2	0	1
10	Lakhimpur	19	17	1	0	1	0
11	Goalpara	16	10	3	2	0	1
12	Jorhat	16	16	0	0	0	0
13	Sribhumi	16	11	5	0	0	0
14	Biswanath	12	12	0	0	0	0
15	Bongaigaon	12	8	1	0	0	3
16	Darrang	12	7	4	0	1	0
17	Dhemaji	12	12	0	0	0	0
18	Hojai	12	7	5	0	0	0
19	Morigaon	12	8	3	0	0	1
20	Nalbari	12	11	1	0	0	0
21	Sibsagar	12	12	0	0	0	0
22	Charaideo	8	8	0	0	0	0
23	Hailakandi	8	3	3	0	0	2
24	Kamrup Metropolitan	6	6	0	0	0	0
25	Bajali	5	4	0	0	0	1
26	Majuli	4	4	0	0	0	0
27	South Salmara Mankachar	4	0	3	0	0	1
Total		397	301	72	8	3	13

=== Anchalik Panchayat (APM) ===
S.No.	District	Total	NDA	INC	AIUDF	RD	Others	IND
1	Nagaon	164	88	65	3	2	0	6
2	Cachar	162	111	36	0	0	1	14
3	Kamrup Rural	139	90	29	1	0	1	18
4	Dhubri	128	26	62	19	2	0	19
5	Golaghat	108	98	6	0	0	0	4
6	Barpeta	102	23	46	21	2	1	9
7	Sribhumi	95	54	33	0	0	1	7
8	Dibrugarh	93	87	2	0	0	0	4
9	Sonitpur	88	79	6	0	0	0	3
10	Tinsukia	86	83	2	0	0	1	0
11	Jorhat	86	82	3	0	0	0	1
12	Morigaon	84	50	24	1	1	1	7
13	Lakhimpur	83	64	12	0	1	0	6
14	Goalpara	81	33	19	8	3	0	18
15	Sibsagar	81	77	3	0	1	0	0
16	Biswanath	73	68	3	0	0	0	2
17	Darrang	73	33	30	1	0	1	8
18	Hojai	68	28	33	3	0	0	4
19	Bongaigaon	65	35	14	5	2	0	9
20	Dhemaji	65	50	10	0	0	0	5
21	Nalbari	64	59	5	0	0	0	0
22	Hailakandi	62	26	15	0	3	0	18
23	Charaideo	36	36	0	0	0	0	0
24	South Salmara Mankachar	35	8	20	2	0	0	5
25	Bajali	27	21	1	0	0	1	4
26	Kamrup Metropolitan	20	18	1	0	0	0	1
27	Majuli	20	18	1	0	0	0	1
Total		2,188	1,445	481	64	17	8	173

== See also ==
- 2021 Assam Legislative Assembly election
- 2024 Indian general election in Assam
