= Maidul Islam Bora =

Indian politician

Maidul Islam Bora (died 4 September 2015) was an Asom Gana Parishad politician from Assam. He was elected to the Assam Legislative Assembly in the 1985 and 1996 elections from Kamalpur. He was minister of sports and youth welfare and food and civil supplies in 1985 and 1996 under the Prafulla Kumar Mahanta- government. His wife Seema Parbin was also an Asom Gana Parishad politician. He died in a private hospital in Guwahati on 4 September 2015.
