= Goalpara West Assembly constituency =

Goalpara West
- Constituency No. 13 for the Assam Legislative Assembly

Constituency details
- Country: India
- Region: Northeast India
- State: Assam
- District: Goalpara
- Lok Sabha constituency: Guwahati
- Established: 1967
- Reservation: ST

Member of Legislative Assembly
- 16th Assam Legislative Assembly
- Incumbent Pabitra Rabha
- Party: Bharatiya Janata Party

Goalpara West Assembly constituency is one of 126 assembly constituencies of the Assam Legislative Assembly in the northeasterm state of Assam, India. Goalpara West is part of Guwahati Lok Sabha constituency.

This constituency is reserved for Scheduled Tribes candidates since 2023.

== Members of Legislative Assembly ==
Year	Member	Party
1967	S. A. Jotder	Praja Socialist Party
1972	S. A. Jotder	Indian National Congress
1978	Nazmul Haque	Indian National Congress
1983	Hassanuddin Ahmed	Indian National Congress
1985	Sheikh Saman Ali	Independent politician
1991	Nazmul Haque	Independent politician
1996	Abu Bakar Siddique Jotdar	Indian National Congress
2001	Sheikh Shah Alam	Nationalist Congress Party
2006	Abdur Rashid Mandal	Indian National Congress
2011	Sheikh Shah Alam	All India United Democratic Front
2016	Abdur Rashid Mandal	Indian National Congress
2021	Abdur Rashid Mandal	Indian National Congress
2026	Pabitra Rabha	Bharatiya Janata Party

== Election results ==
=== 2026 ===
2026 Assam Legislative Assembly election: Goalpara West
Party	Candidate	Votes	%	±%
BJP	Pabitra Rabha (politician)	92,216	63.39	N/A
INC	Markline Marak	52,299	35.95	−18.67
Independent	Dhanjeep Prasad Rabha	961	0.66	New
NOTA	None of the above	913	0.62	−0.21
Margin of victory		39,917	27.44	−1.86
Turnout		1,47,530		
Registered electors				
BJP gain from INC		Swing	+8.77	

=== 2021 ===
2021 Assam Legislative Assembly election: Goalpara West
Party	Candidate	Votes	%	±%
INC	Abdur Rashid Mandal	85,752	54.62	+9.83
AGP	Sheikh Shah Alam	39,728	25.3	+24.46
Independent	Chan Ali Miah	17,786	11.3	New
Independent	Nabajyoti Rabha	5,276	3.4	New
NOTA	None of the above	1,308	0.83	+0.36
Margin of victory		46,024	29.3	+11.43
Turnout		1,56,979	97.6	+5.93
Registered electors				
INC gain from		Swing		

=== 2016 ===
2016 Assam Legislative Assembly election: Goalpara West
Party	Candidate	Votes	%	±%
INC	Abdur Rashid Mandal	61,007	44.77	+24.65
AIUDF	Sheikh Shah Alam	36,668	26.90	−7.27
BJP	Jabeen Barbhuiyan	32,432	23.80	+22.39
AGP	Anowar Hussain	1,154	0.84	−23.44
SUCI(C)	Mohibul Islam	1,016	0.74	−1.14
AITC	Zesmina Khatun	582	0.42	−0.38
Independent	Mizanur Rahman	523	0.38	N/A
RPI(A)	Khanindra Chandra Nath	489	0.35	N/A
Independent	Babli Goswami Chakraborty	480	0.35	N/A
JMBP	Ali Akbar	457	0.33	N/A
Independent	Jali Begum	289	0.21	N/A
NPP	Joynal Abedin	269	0.19	N/A
NAICP	Giasuddin Ahmed	252	0.18	N/A
NOTA	None of the above	646	0.47	N/A
Majority		24,339	17.87	+7.98
Turnout		1,36,264	91.67	+2.98
INC gain from AIUDF		Swing	+15.69	

=== 2011 ===
2011 Assam Legislative Assembly election: Goalpara West
Party	Candidate	Votes	%	±%
AIUDF	Sheikh Shah Alam	37,800	34.17	+9.91
AGP	Purandar Rabha	26,862	24.28	+4.42
INC	Abdur Rashid Mandal	22,261	20.12	−6.77
NCP	Abs Joddar	19,154	17.31	−0.45
SUCI(C)	Nazmul Haque	2,069	1.87	N/A
BJP	Nishikanta Hajong	1,563	1.41	−0.59
AITC	Dilip Roy	894	0.80	N/A
Majority		10,938	9.89	+7.26
Turnout		1,10,603	88.69	+6.00
AIUDF gain from INC		Swing	+1.57	

=== 2006 ===
Assam Legislative Assembly election, 2006: Goalpara West
Party	Candidate	Votes	%	±%
INC	Abdur Rashid Mandal	26,330	26.89	
AIUDF	Ahammad Ali	23,755	24.26	
AGP	Robin Rabha	19,440	19.86	
NCP	Abu Bakkar Siddique Jotdar	17,393	17.76	
Independent	Nozmul Haque	6,534	6.67	
BJP	Saman Ali	1,961	2.00	
AIMF	Nazir Uddin Ahmed	645	0.66	
AGP(P)	Abul Kashem	525	0.54	
Independent	Arif Uddin Ahmed	486	0.50	
IUML	Jahirul Islam	472	0.48	
LJP	Delowara Begum	365	0.37	
Majority		2,575	2.63	
Turnout		97,906	82.69	
INC gain from NCP		Swing		
