= Digboi Assembly constituency =

Constituency of the Assam legislative assembly in India

Digboi
- Constituency No. 84 for the Assam Legislative Assembly

Constituency details
- Country: India
- Region: Northeast India
- State: Assam
- District: Tinsukia
- Lok Sabha constituency: Dibrugarh
- Established: 1951
- Reservation: None

Digboi Assembly constituency is one of the 126 assembly constituencies of Assam, a northeast state of India. Digboi is also part of Dibrugarh Lok Sabha constituency.

== Details ==
Following are details on Digboi Assembly constituency:

- Country: India.
- State: Assam.
- District: Tinsukia district.
- Lok Sabha Constituency: Dibrugarh Lok Sabha constituency.
- Area Includes: Digboi M.B., Digboi Oil Town (CT), Hapjan Dev. Block(Part), Kakopather Dev. Block(Part), Margherita Dev. Block(Part).

== Members of Legislative Assembly ==
Election	Member	Party affiliation
1951	Jadav Chandra Khakhlari	Indian National Congress
1951	Dalbir Singh Lohar	Indian National Congress
1957	Dwijesh Chandra Deb Sarma	Indian National Congress
1962	Dwijesh Chandra Deb Sarma	Indian National Congress
1967	J.N. Bhuyan	Indian National Congress
1972	Chandra Bahadur Chetri	Indian National Congress
1978	Rameswar Dhanowar	Indian National Congress (I)
1983	Rameswar Dhanowar	Indian National Congress
1985	Rameswar Dhanowar	Indian National Congress
1991	Rameswar Dhanowar	Indian National Congress
1996	Rameswar Dhanowar	Indian National Congress
2001	Rameswar Dhanowar	Indian National Congress
2006	Rameswar Dhanowar	Indian National Congress
2011	Rameswar Dhanowar	Indian National Congress
2016	Suren Phukan	Bharatiya Janata Party
2021	Suren Phukan	Bharatiya Janata Party

== Election results ==
=== 2026 ===
2026 Assam Legislative Assembly election: Digboi
Party	Candidate	Votes	%	±%
BJP	Suren Phukan	65690	56.27	
RD	Dulal Moran	24617	21.09	
JMM	Bharat Nayak	19638	16.82	
NOTA	None of the above	2697	2.31	
AITC	Jiten Nag	2441	2.09	
Independent	Lakheswar Moran	1666	1.43	
Margin of victory		41073		
Turnout		116749		
Registered electors				
BJP hold		Swing		

=== 2016 ===
2016 Assam Legislative Assembly election: Digboi
Party	Candidate	Votes	%	±%
BJP	Suren Phukan	49,167	51.47	+15.36
INC	Gautam Dhanowar	34,874	36.50	−13.54
Independent	Pranab Chetia	4,841	5.06	N/A
Independent	Imran Siddique	1,166	1.22	N/A
Independent	Biswanath Sarma Bordoloi	977	1.02	N/A
NCP	Nogen Dhekial Phukan	923	0.96	N/A
Independent	Bhabakanta Chutia	743	0.77	N/A
Independent	Chandan Bagh	588	0.61	N/A
NOTA	None of the above	2,246	2.35	N/A
Majority		14,343	14.97	+1.04
Turnout		95,525	82.69	+13.59
Registered electors		1,15,517		
BJP gain from INC		Swing		

=== 2011 ===
2011 Assam Legislative Assembly election: Digboi
Party	Candidate	Votes	%	±%
INC	Rameswar Dhanowar	38,663	50.04	+6.57
BJP	Suren Phukan	27,905	36.11	+19.18
AGP	Bhulen Baruah	6,253	8.09	−19.91
JMM	Chandan Bagh	2,514	3.25	N/A
AITC	Alok Roy	1,936	2.50	N/A
Majority		10,758	13.93	−1.54
Turnout		77,271	69.10	−4.66
Registered electors		1,11,823		
INC hold		Swing		

=== 2006 ===
Assam Legislative Assembly election, 2006: Digboi
Party	Candidate	Votes	%	±%
INC	Rameswar Dhanowar	35,773	43.47	
AGP	Suren Phukan	23,038	28.00	
BJP	Bijoy Tanty	13,928	16.93	
AGP(P)	Diganta Saikia	4,068	4.94	
CPI(M)	Maneswar Burman	3,039	3.69	
Independent	Binoy Saikia	2,446	2.97	
Majority		12,735	15.47	
Turnout		82,292	73.76	
Registered electors		1,11,564		
INC hold		Swing		

== See also ==
- Digboi
- Tinsukia district
- List of constituencies of Assam Legislative Assembly
