= Baghbar Assembly constituency =

Constituency of the Assam legislative assembly in India

Coordinates: 26.23°N 90.89°E

Baghbar
- Former constituency No. 45 for the Assam Legislative Assembly

Constituency details
- Country: India
- Region: Northeast India
- State: Assam
- District: Barpeta
- Lok Sabha constituency: Barpeta
- Established: 1967
- Abolished: 2023
- Total electors: 165,834
- Reservation: None

Baghbar was one of the 126 assembly constituencies of Assam Legislative Assembly. Baghbar forms part of the Barpeta Lok Sabha constituency. The constituency covered Baghbar thana (excluding Jania (Part) and Titapani mouzas) in Barpeta sub-division.

This constituency was abolished in 2023.

== Members of Legislative Assembly ==
- 1967: J. Ahmed, Independent.
- 1972: Jalal Uddin, Indian National Congress.
- 1978: Ibrahim Ali, Indian National Congress.
- 1983: Ibrahim Ali, Indian National Congress.
- 1985: Sheikh Abdul Hamid, Independent.
- 1991: Dildar Rezza, Indian National Congress.
- 1996: Sheikh Abdul Hamid, United Minorities Front (Assam).
- 2001: Dildar Rezza, Indian National Congress.
- 2006: Dildar Rezza, Indian National Congress.
- 2011: Sherman Ali Ahmed, All India United Democratic Front.
- 2016: Sherman Ali Ahmed, Indian National Congress.

Election	Name	Party
2021	Sherman Ali Ahmed	Indian National Congress

== Election results ==
=== 2016 ===
2016 Assam Legislative Assembly election: Baghbar
Party	Candidate	Votes	%	±%
INC	Sherman Ali Ahmed	73,340	57.57	
AIUDF	Sheikh Abdul Hamid	29,907	23.47	
Independent	Rajib Ahmed	18,357	14.41	
BJP	Md. Abdul Barik	1,418	1.11	
JCPBV	Altaf Hussain	1,022	0.80	
BRP	Jamaluddin	868	0.68	
Independent	Jahidul Islam	642	0.50	
RPI	Rejaul Karim	435	0.34	
AITC	Ali Asgar	411	0.32	
NOTA	None of the above	974	0.76	
Majority		43,433	34.10	
Turnout		1,27,374	87.87	
Registered electors		1,44,950		
INC gain from AIUDF		Swing		
