= Gauhati West Assembly constituency =

Constituency of the Assam legislative assembly in India

Coordinates: 26.12°N 91.61°E

Gauhati West
- Former constituency No. 54 for the Assam Legislative Assembly

Constituency details
- Country: India
- Region: Northeast India
- State: Assam
- District: Kamrup Metropolitan
- Lok Sabha constituency: Gauhati
- Established: 1967
- Abolished: 2023
- Reservation: None

Gauhati West Assembly constituency was one of the 126 assembly constituencies of Assam a north east state of India. Gauhati West was also part of Gauhati Lok Sabha constituency.

This constituency was abolished in 2023.

== Members of Legislative Assembly ==
Year	Name	Party
1967	Govinda Kalita	Communist Party of India
1972	Biren Ram Phookun	Indian National Congress
1978	Kiran Chandra Bezbarua	Janata Party
1983	Tarini Kanta Boro	Indian National Congress
1985	Ramendra Narayan Kalita	Independent politician
1991	Ramendra Narayan Kalita	Natun Asom Gana Parishad
1996	Ramendra Narayan Kalita	Asom Gana Parishad
2001	Hemanta Talukdar	Indian National Congress
2006	Ramendra Narayan Kalita	Asom Gana Parishad
2011	Hemanta Talukdar	Indian National Congress
2016	Ramendra Narayan Kalita	Asom Gana Parishad
2021	Ramendra Narayan Kalita	Asom Gana Parishad
Constituency abolished

== Election results ==
=== 2016 ===
2016 Assam Legislative Assembly election: Gauhati West
Party	Candidate	Votes	%	±%
AGP	Ramendra Narayan Kalita	132,184	64.06	+41.61
INC	Dr. Jury Sharma Bordoloi	42,274	20.48	−14.08
Independent	Hemanta Talukdar	12,397	6.00	
Independent	Pranab Sarmah	5,838	2.82	
AITC	Deba Kumar Barman	4,269	2.06	
Independent	Jayanta Boro	1,771	0.85	
The National Road Map Party of India	Md. Javed Hussain Tanwar	1,741	0.84	
Independent	Md. Iftazur Rahman	763	0.36	
Bharatiya Gana Parishad	Subimal Biswas	684	0.33	
LJP	Mitan Sarkar	613	0.29	
SS	Pulak Ranjan Chakrabarty	612	0.29	
Rashtriya Pragati Party	Hasnur Ali	496	0.24	
Rashtriya Janshakti Party	Manas Pratim Das	398	0.19	
NOTA	None of the above	2,280	1.10	
Majority		89,910	43.58	+36.39
Turnout		2,06,320	81.24	+15.37
Registered electors		2,53,557		
AGP gain from INC		Swing		

=== 2011 ===
2011 Assam Legislative Assembly election: Gauhati West
Party	Candidate	Votes	%	±%
INC	Hemanta Talukdar	54,343	34.50	
BJP	Manoj Ram Phukan	43,017	27.31	
AGP	Ramendra Narayan Kalita	35,361	22.45	
Independent	Ashok Anand Singhal	12,642	8.03	
BPF	Prasanna Malla Buzar Baruah	6,174	3.92	
AITC	Parul Saikia	1,382	0.88	
Independent	Swapan Kumar Basumatary	1,374	0.87	
Independent	Ranjeet Kumar Deka	1,114	0.71	
AIMF	Hasina Ahmed	738	0.47	
Independent	Chandra Kamal Bhagwati	707	0.45	
SS	Nanda Kishor Soni	646	0.41	
Majority		20,326	7.19	
Turnout		1,57,498	65.87	
INC gain from AGP		Swing		

== See also ==
- Guwahati
- List of constituencies of Assam Legislative Assembly
