= Satyabrat Kalita =

Indian politician

Satyabrat Kalita is an Indian politician from Assam, India. He was elected to the Assam Legislative Assembly in the 2016 elections from Kamalpur.

He was formerly associated with Asom Gana Parishad. On 8 September 2025 he joined Indian National Congress.
