= Suren Phukan =

Indian politician

Member of Assam Legislative Assembly
- Incumbent
- Assumed office 2016
- Preceded by: Rameswar Dhanowar
- Constituency: Digboi

Personal details
- Born: 17 November 1969 (age 56)
- Party: Bharatiya Janata Party
- Parent: Tileswar Phukan (father)

Suren Phukan (born 17 November 1969) is an Indian politician from Assam. He is a three time member of the Assam Legislative Assembly representing the Bharatiya Janata Party. He was elected as an MLA in 2016, 2021 and 2026 from Digboi (Vidhan Sabha constituency).

== Early life and education ==
Suren Phukan was born in Tinsukia, Assam, and completed his schooling in Tinsukia district.

== Career ==
Phukan became an MLA for the first time in 2016 from Digboi Assembly constituency representing the Bharatiya Janata Party. He retained the seat for BJP in the 2021 election and won for a third time in the 2026 Assam Legislative Assembly election. In 2026, he polled 74,694 votes and defeated his nearest rival, Dulal Moran of the Raijor Dal, by a margin of 28,276 votes.
