= Morigaon Assembly constituency =

Constituency of the Assam legislative assembly in India

Coordinates: 26.25°N 92.34°E

Morigaon
- Constituency No. 54 for the Assam Legislative Assembly

Constituency details
- Country: India
- Region: Northeast India
- State: Assam
- District: Morigaon
- Lok Sabha constituency: Nowgong
- Established: 1972
- Reservation: None

Member of Legislative Assembly
- 16th Assam Legislative Assembly
- Incumbent Rama Kanta Dewri
- Party: BJP
- Alliance: National Democratic Alliance
- Elected year: 2021

Morigaon Assembly constituency is one of the 126 assembly constituencies of Assam Legislative Assembly. Morigaon forms part of the Nagaon Lok Sabha constituency.

== Members of Legislative Assembly ==
Election	Name	Party
1972	Pitsing Konwar	Independent politician
1978	Kaliram Dekaraja	Indian National Congress
1983	Md Hussain	Independent politician
1985	Harendra Bora	Independent politician
1991	Munin Mahanta	Communist Party of India
1996	Munin Mahanta	Communist Party of India
2001	Jonjonali Baruah	Indian National Congress
2006	Jonjonali Baruah	Indian National Congress
2011	Jonjonali Baruah	Indian National Congress
2016	Rama Kanta Dewri	Bharatiya Janata Party
2021	Rama Kanta Dewri	Bharatiya Janata Party

== Election results ==
=== 2026 ===
2026 Assam Legislative Assembly election: Morigaon
Party	Candidate	Votes	%	±%
BJP	Rama Kanta Dewri	117,942	66.53	
AJP	Bani Kanta Das	52.453	29.59	
NOTA	NOTA	2027	1.14	
Margin of victory		65,489		
Turnout		1,77,283		
Rejected ballots				
Registered electors				
BJP hold		Swing		

=== 2021 ===
2021 Assam Legislative Assembly election: Morigaon
Party	Candidate	Votes	%	±%
BJP	Rama Kanta Dewri	81,657	52.15	−4.94
AJP	Bani Kanta Das	45,125	28.82	
CPI	Munin Mahanta	27,290	17.43	+14.93
NOTA	None of the above	1,571	1.00	
Independent	Ratul Bora	939	0.60	
Majority		36,532	23.33	
Turnout		156,582		
Registered electors				
BJP hold		Swing		

=== 2016 ===
2016 Assam Legislative Assembly election: Morigaon
Party	Candidate	Votes	%	±%
BJP	Rama Kanta Dewri	80669	57.09	
INC	Jonjonali Baruah	51046	36.13	
CPI	Munin Mahanta	3526	2.5	
Majority				
Turnout				
Registered electors				
BJP gain from INC		Swing		
