= Bilasipara East Assembly constituency =

Assembly constituency of Assam

Coordinates: 26.24°N 90.25°E

Bilasipara East
- Former constituency No. 27 for the Assam Legislative Assembly

Constituency details
- Country: India
- Region: Northeast India
- State: Assam
- Division: Lower Assam
- District: Dhubri
- Lok Sabha constituency: Dhubri Lok Sabha constituency
- Established: 1978
- Abolished: 2023
- Reservation: None

Bilasipara East Assembly constituency was one of the 126 constituencies of the Assam Legislative Assembly in India. Bilasipara East forms a part of the Dhubri Lok Sabha constituency.

This constituency was abolished in 2023.

== Town Details ==
Following are details on Bilasipara East Assembly constituency-

- Country: India.
- State: Assam.
- District: Dhubri district .
- Lok Sabha Constituency: Dhubri Lok Sabha/Parliamentary constituency.
- Assembly Categorisation: Rural
- Literacy Level: 80.47%.
- Eligible Electors as per 2021 General Elections: 2,17,630 Eligible Electors. Male Electors:1,09,571 . Female Electors: 1,08,059.
- Geographic Co-Ordinates: 26°17'29.4"N 90°19'44.0"E.
- Total Area Covered: 493 square kilometres.
- Area Includes: Bilasipara town committee and Bilasipara thana [excluding Sapatgram town committee ard the villages specified in items (9) and (10) of the Appendix] in Dhubri sub-division, of Dhubri district of Assam:.
- Inter State Border : Dhubri.
- Number Of Polling Stations: Year 2011-217, Year 2016-235, Year 2021-27.

== Members of Legislative Assembly ==
Following is the list of past members representing Bilasipara East Assembly constituency in Assam Legislature.

Year	Winner	Party
1978	Sarat Chandra Sinha	Indian National Congress
1983	Rookmini Kanta Roye	Indian National Congress
1985	Sarat Chandra Sinha	Indian Congress (Socialist) - Sarat Chandra Sinha
1991	Anowar Hussain	Indian National Congress
1996	Prasanta Barua	Asom Gana Parishad
2001	Prasanta Barua	Asom Gana Parishad
2006	Prasanta Barua	Asom Gana Parishad
2011	Gul Akhtara Begum	All India United Democratic Front
2016	Ashok Kumar Singhi	Bharatiya Janata Party
2021	Samsul Huda	All India United Democratic Front

== Election results ==
=== 2021 ===
2021 Assam Legislative Assembly election: Bilasipara East
Party	Candidate	Votes	%	±%
AIUDF	Samsul Huda	116,068		
BJP	Ashok Kumar Singhi	66,768		
AJP	Kalal Das	3,375		
Independent	Mominur Islam	2,891		N/A
Independent	Moshlem Uddin Choudhury	1,657		N/A
JD(U)	Abdul Monnaf Pramanik	908		N/A
Independent	Jitendra Nath Adhikary	634		N/A
Independent	Abdul Jabbar	483		N/A
Independent	Mizanur Rahman	478		N/A
RPI	Prodip Chandra Roy	403		N/A
Independent	Moynul Hoque	371		N/A

=== 2016 ===
2016 Assam Legislative Assembly election: Bilasipara East
Party	Candidate	Votes	%	±%
BJP	Ashok Kumar Singhi	59,206	35.29	+33.42
INC	Amrit Badsha	54,110	32.26	+19.06
AIUDF	Moshlemuddin Choudhury	43,213	25.76	−10.91
Independent	Anwar Hussain	4,941	2.94	N/A
Independent	Siddique Hussein	1,047	0.62	N/A
Independent	Amarendra Nath	749	0.44	N/A
Independent	Martial Russel	733	0.43	N/A
Independent	Nishil Kumar Ray	720	0.42	N/A
Independent	Tridippati Singha	700	0.41	N/A
SP	Amzad Hussein	500	0.29	N/A
Independent	Ashwin Mahanta	406	0.24	N/A
RPI(A)	Mominur Ali Sheikh	340	0.20	N/A
NOTA	None of the above	1,073	0.63	N/A
Majority		5,096	3.03	−15.06
Turnout		1,67,728	90.66	+7.83
Registered electors		1,84,994		
BJP gain from AIUDF		Swing		

=== 2011 ===
2011 Assam Legislative Assembly election: Bilasipara East
Party	Candidate	Votes	%	±%
AIUDF	Gul Akhtara Begum	49,519	36.67	
AGP	Prasanta Barua	25,094	18.58	
BPF	Uma Rani Basumatary	23,326	17.27	
INC	Bharati Baruah	17,830	13.20	
Independent	Wasim Raja	7,613	5.64	
Independent	Abdul Hamid	3,904	2.89	
BJP	Purandar Nath	2,529	1.87	
AITC	Moinul Hoque	1,889	1.40	
Independent	Moniruzzaman	1,707	1.26	
CPI	Bipin Barman	970	0.72	
Lok Bharti	Mohendra Chandra Roy	648	0.48	
Majority		24,425	18.09	
Turnout		1,35,029	82.83	
Registered electors		1,63,007		
AIUDF gain from AGP		Swing		
