= Govinda Kalita =

Indian politician

Member of the Assam Legislative Assembly
- In office 1967–1972
- Preceded by: Constituency Established
- Succeeded by: Biren Ram Phookun
- Constituency: Gauhati West

Govinda Kalita was an Indian politician and leader of Communist Party of India. He represented Gauhati West constituency in the Assam Legislative Assembly from 1967 to 1972.
