= Pabitra Rabha (politician) =

Indian politician (born 1996)

Assam Legislative Assembly
- Incumbent
- Assumed office May 2026
- Constituency: Goalpara West Assembly constituency

Personal details
- Born: 1996 (age 29–30)
- Party: Bharatiya Janata Party
- Profession: Politician

Pabitra Rabha (born 1996) is an Indian politician from Assam. He is a member of the Assam Legislative Assembly from the Goalpara West Assembly constituency, which is reserved for Scheduled Tribe community, in Goalpara district representing the Bharatiya Janata Party.

== Early life ==
Rabha is from Goalpara, Goalpara district, Assam. He is the son of Rahin Chandra Rabha. He did his Bachelor of Arts at Agia College, Agia in 2016. His wife is a teacher. He declared assets worth Rs.37 lakhs in his affidavit to the Election Commission of India.

== Career ==
Rabha won the Goalpara West Assembly constituency representing the Bharatiya Janata Party in the 2026 Assam Legislative Assembly election. He polled 92,216 votes and defeated his nearest rival, Markline Marak of the Indian National Congress, by a margin of 39,917 votes.
