= Jadab Chandra Deka =

Indian politician

Jadab Chandra Deka is a Bharatiya Janata Party politician from Assam. He was elected in the Assam Legislative Assembly election in 2011 from Kamalpur.
