= Sumitra Hazarika =

Indian activist

Sumitra Hazarika is an Indian activist. She was born in a village near to Titabor in Assam, India. She was married to Manindra Gogoi until his death in 2015 and was sister-in-law to Bhupen Hazarika. She is president of the Mission for Integration, Gender Equalization, Harmony and Fight against Threat (MIGHT). She also works for the Assam State Commission for Women. In 2022, she filed a first information report (FIR) with the police against politician Sherman Ali Ahmed regarding his televised comments on rape. President Pranab Mukherjee gave Hazarika the Nari Shakti Puraskar on 8 March 2017 in recognition of her services. She also was awarded the Prag Perona in 2018.
