= Kamalpur, Assam Assembly constituency =

Constituency of the Assam legislative assembly in India

Kamalpur
- Constituency No. 32 for the Assam Legislative Assembly

Constituency details
- Country: India
- Region: Northeast India
- State: Assam
- District: Kamrup
- Lok Sabha constituency: Darrang–Udalguri
- Established: 1951
- Reservation: None

Member of Legislative Assembly
- 16th Assam Legislative Assembly
- Incumbent Diganta Kalita
- Party: Bharatiya Janata Party

Kamalpur Assembly constituency is one of the assembly constituencies of Assam Legislative Assembly. Kamalpur forms part of the newly formed Darrang–Udalguri Lok Sabha constituency.

== Members of Legislative Assembly ==
Election	Name	Party
1951	Mohendranath Deka	Independent
1957	Sarat Chandra Goswami	Indian National Congress
1962	Sarat Chandra Goswami	Indian National Congress
1967	L. Choudhury	Praja Socialist Party
1972	Girindra Choudhury	Indian National Congress
1978	Daibasakti Deka	Janata Party
1983	Mathura Deka	Communist Party of India
1985	Maidul Islam Bora	Independent
1991	Dr Hitesh Deka	Natun Asom Gana Parishad
1996	Maidul Islam Bora	Asom Gana Parishad
2001	Uttara Kalita	Indian National Congress
2006	Uttara Kalita	Indian National Congress
2011	Jadab Chandra Deka	Bharatiya Janata Party
2016	Satyabrat Kalita	Asom Gana Parishad
2021	Diganta Kalita	Bharatiya Janata Party
2026	Diganta Kalita	Bharatiya Janata Party

== Election results ==
=== 2026 ===
2026 Assam Legislative Assembly election: Kamalpur
Party	Candidate	Votes	%	±%
BJP	Diganta Kalita	74,455	45.33	
INC	Satyabrat Kalita	55,006	33.49	
Independent (BJP Rebel)	Ankur Das	31,940	19.45	
NOTA	None of the Above	1435	0.87	
Margin of victory		19449		
Turnout		164239		
Rejected ballots				
Registered electors				
Diganta Kalita gain from Satyabrat Kalita		Swing		

=== 2021 ===
2021 Assam Legislative Assembly election: Kamalpur
Party	Candidate	Votes	%	±%
INC	Kishor Kumar Bhattacharyya	62,969	42.53	
Social Unity Centre of India	Sisir Kumar Kakati	7,21		
BJP	Diganta Kalita	81,083	54.50	
Margin of victory		19,449		
Turnout				
Rejected ballots				
Registered electors				
BJP gain from AGP		Swing		

=== 2016 ===
2016 Assam Legislative Assembly election: Kamalpur
Party	Candidate	Votes	%	±%
AGP	Satyabrat Kalita	78,170	57.70	
INC	Pranjit Choudhury	41,261	30.45	
Independent	Matlebuddin Ahmed	6,882	5.08	
Independent	Omar Rashid	3,400	2.50	
AITC	Madhabi Deka	1,840	1.35	
Independent	Harmohan Rajbongshi	1,021	0.75	
JMBP	Ramen Mahanta	650	0.47	
Independent	Saidur Rahman	505	0.37	
Independent	Rekibar Rahman	441	0.32	
SUCI(C)	Sisir Kakati	361	0.26	
NOTA	None of the above	939	0.69	
Majority		36,909	27.25	
Turnout		1,35,470	85.78	
Registered electors		1,57,921		
AGP gain from BJP		Swing		

== See also ==
- List of constituencies of the Assam Legislative Assembly
