= Bilasipara West Assembly constituency =

Assembly constituency of Assam

Coordinates: 26.24°N 90.21°E

Bilasipara West
- Former constituency No. 26 for the Assam Legislative Assembly

Constituency details
- Country: India
- Region: Northeast India
- State: Assam
- Division: Lower Assam
- District: Dhubri
- Lok Sabha constituency: Dhubri Lok Sabha constituency
- Established: 1951
- Abolished: 2023
- Reservation: None

Bilasipara West Assembly constituency was one of the 126 constituencies of the Assam Legislative Assembly in India. Bilasipara West forms a part of the Dhubri Lok Sabha constituency.

This constituency was abolished in 2023.

== Members of Legislative Assembly ==
=== Bilasipara constituency ===
Year	Winner	Party
1951	Md.Umaruddin	Independent politician
1957	Ahmed Jahanuddin	PSP
1962	Derajuddin Sarkar	Indian National Congress
1967	Giasuddin Ahmed	Independent politician
1972	Giasuddin Ahmed	Independent politician

=== Bilasipara West constituency ===
Following is the list of past members representing Bilasipara West constituency Assembly constituency in Assam Legislature.

Year	Winner	Party
1978	Giasuddin Ahmed	Independent politician
1983	Sirajuddin	Indian National Congress
1985	Yusuf Ali Ahmed	Independent politician
1991	Giasuddin Ahmed	Communist Party of India
1996	Ali Akbar Miah	All India Indira Congress
2001	Ali Akbar Miah	Asom Gana Parishad
2006	Hafiz Bashir Ahmed	Assam United Democratic Front
2011	Hafiz Bashir Ahmed	All India United Democratic Front
2016	Hafiz Bashir Ahmed	All India United Democratic Front
2021	Hafiz Bashir Ahmed	All India United Democratic Front

== Election results ==
=== 2016 ===
2016 Assam Legislative Assembly election: Bilasipara West
Party	Candidate	Votes	%	±%
AIUDF	Hafiz Bashir Ahmed	44,407	32.29	−3.90
Independent	Ali Akbar Miah	33,205	24.14	N/A
INC	Sabana Aktar	25,515	18.55	−14.26
AGP	Ali Azom Sheikh	14,688	10.68	+9.22
CPI	Giasuddin Ahmed	6,792	4.93	+0.88
Independent	Biplab Mukherjee	5,812	4.22	N/A
Independent	Atowar Hussain	1,997	1.45	N/A
Independent	Saiful Islam	1,412	1.02	N/A
Independent	Sheikh Monshur Rahman	616	0.44	N/A
SP	Moharuddin Mondal	577	0.41	N/A
RPI(A)	Afzalur Rahman	498	0.36	N/A
JCP	Ajmira Aktar	492	0.35	N/A
Independent	Prakrita Kumar Nath	486	0.35	N/A
IUML	Yousub Ali Ahmed	250	0.18	N/A
NOTA	None of the above	766	0.55	N/A
Majority		11,202	8.15	+4.77
Turnout		1,37,513	93.45	+5.73
Registered electors		1,47,151		
AIUDF hold		Swing		

=== 2011 ===
2011 Assam Legislative Assembly election: Bilasipara West
Party	Candidate	Votes	%	±%
AIUDF	Hafiz Bashir Ahmed	40,501	36.19	
INC	Ali Akbar Miah	36,717	32.81	
BPF	Batendra Brahma	23,070	20.62	
CPI	Giasuddin Ahmed	4,532	4.05	
AITC	Hatem Ali Choudhury	2,261	2.02	
AGP	Sheikh Monshur Rahman	1,635	1.46	
Independent	Entaz Ali	1,250	1.12	
BJP	Minati Sarkar Roy	1,007	0.90	
Lok Bharti	Mokles Rahman	573	0.51	
Independent	Akbar Ali	362	0.32	
Majority		3,784	3.38	
Turnout		1,11,908	87.72	
Registered electors		1,27,581		
AIUDF hold		Swing		
