= Diganta Kalita =

Indian politician

Member of Assam Legislative Assembly
- Incumbent
- Assumed office 4 May 2026
- Constituency: Kamalpur, Assam Assembly constituency
- In office 4 May 2021 – 9 April 2026
- Constituency: Kamalpur, Assam Assembly constituency

Personal details
- Party: Bharatiya Janata Party
- Spouse: Juli Kalita
- Children: Son: Rahul & Daughter: Chandrima
- Education: Gauhati University

Diganta Kalita (born 2 January 1969) is an Indian politician. He is serving as 2nd Term member of the Assam legislative Assembly representing the Kamalpur Assembly constituency. He is a member of Bharatiya Janata Party.

== Early life and education ==
He was born on 2 January 1969 to Haladhar Kalita. He completed his schooling from MGM School, Noonmati and later completed Bachelor of Science from Gauhati University in 1989.

== Political career ==
He joined Indian National Congress during his college days in 1985 and later became a state secretary of Assam Pradesh Congress Committee. He resigned from the post of APCC secretary on 14 August 2014 and joined Bharatiya Janata Party on 10 September 2015. In the 2021 Assam assembly election he contested from the Kamalpur Assembly constituency and won against Indian National Congress candidate Kishor Kumar Bhattacharya with a margin of 18,114 votes.

== Personal life ==
He married Juli Kalita on 7 December 1996. They have a son named Rahul Kalita and a daughter named Chandrima Kalita.
