= Phanidhar Talukdar =

Indian politician

Member of Assam Legislative Assembly
- Incumbent
- Assumed office 21 May 2021
- Preceded by: Abul Kalam Azad
- Constituency: Bhabanipur

Personal details
- Party: Bharatiya Janata Party
- Other political affiliations: All India United Democratic Front
- Spouse: Jamini Talukdar

Phanidhar Talukdar is an Indian politician from Assam. He was elected to the Assam Legislative Assembly from Bhabanipur in the 2021 Assam Legislative Assembly election as a member of the All India United Democratic Front. On 31 August 2021, he resigned from All India United Democratic Front and joined the BJP on 1 September 2021.
