= Ramendra Narayan Kalita =

Indian politician

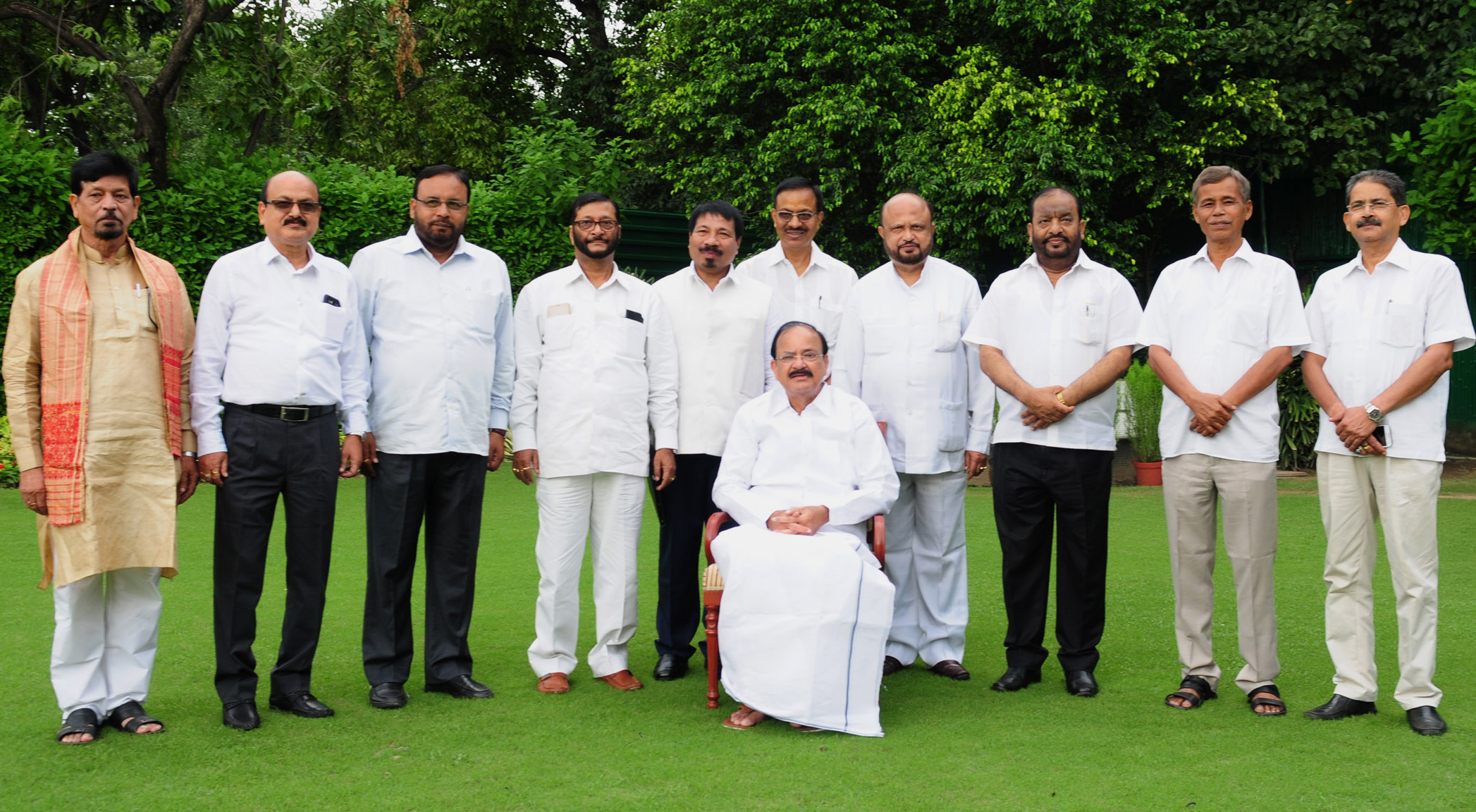
- R. Kalita in between Brindaban Goswami & Keshab Mahanta in Left side.

Member of the Assam Legislative Assembly
- In office 2016-2026
- Preceded by: Hemanta Talukdar
- Constituency: Guwahati West
- In office 2006–2011
- Preceded by: Hemanta Talukdar
- Succeeded by: Hemanta Talukdar
- In office 1985–2001
- Preceded by: Tarini Kanta Boro
- Succeeded by: Hemanta Talukdar

Chairman, Assam Electronics Development Corporation (AAMTRON)
- In office September, 2001 – September 2008
- Preceded by: Ritubaran Sarma

Minister of State for Sericulture, Government of Assam
- In office 1996–2001

Personal details
- Party: Asom Gana Parishad
- Other political affiliations: Notun Assam Gana Parishad
- Education: Gauhati University

Ramendra Narayan Kalita is an Asom Gana Parishad politician from Assam, India. He was elected in Assam Legislative Assembly election in 1985 to 1996, 2006, 2016 and 2021 from Gauhati West constituency.
