= Sherman Ali Ahmed =

Indian politician

Member of Assam Legislative Assembly
- Incumbent
- Assumed office 4 May 2026
- Preceded by: Constituency established
- Constituency: Mandia
- In office 13 May 2011 – 4 May 2026
- Preceded by: Dildar Rezza
- Succeeded by: Constituency dissolved
- Constituency: Baghbar

Personal details
- Party: All India Trinamool Congress (2026–present); Indian National Congress (2016–2026); All India United Democratic Front (2011–2016)
- Education: Cotton College, Eastern Forest Rangers' College (B. Sc in Forestry)
- Profession: Politician

Sherman Ali Ahmed is an Indian politician and member of the All India Trinamool Congress. He is an MLA, elected from the Baghbar constituency in the 2011 Assam Legislative Assembly election as an All India United Democratic Front candidate. In the 2016 and 2021 assembly elections he was re-elected from the same constituency as an Indian National Congress candidate. In 2022, activist Sumitra Hazarika filed a first information report (FIR) with the police regarding his televised comments about rape.
