= Hafiz Bashir Ahmed =

Indian politician

Hafiz Bashir Ahmed Qasmi
- হাফিজ বছিৰ আহমেদ কাছিমী

Member of the Assam Legislative Assembly for Bilasipara West constituency
- Incumbent
- Assumed office 2006
- Preceded by: Ali Akbar Miah (AGP)

Personal details
- Born: August 1, 1960 (age 66) Bilasipara, Assam, India
- Party: All India United Democratic Front
- Spouse: Tyeeba Khatun (m. 1982)
- Children: 5 sons and 1 daughter
- Parents: Hafiz Noor Ahmed (father); Masiran Nessa (mother)
- Education: Darul Uloom Deoband; Gauhati University
- Profession: Scholar, Philosopher, Thinker, Writer and a Politician
- Awards: Best legislator award (2018-19)

Bashir Ahmed (born 1 August 1960 in Bilasipara, Assam) is an All India United Democratic Front politician from Assam, India. He was elected to the Assam Legislative Assembly from the Bilasipara West constituency in the 2006, 2011, 2016, and 2021 elections.
