= Leho Ram Boro =

Indian politician (died 2021)

Member of Assam Legislative Assembly
- In office 2 May 2021 – 29 May 2021
- Preceded by: Emmanuel Moshahary
- Succeeded by: Jolen Daimary
- Constituency: Tamulpur

Personal details
- Party: United People's Party Liberal
- Education: Cotton College, Gauhati
- Profession: Politician

Leho Ram Boro (?–29 May 2021 in Guwahati) was an Indian politician from United People's Party Liberal in Assam.

== Biography ==
He was a Member of the Assam Legislative Assembly for Tamulpur, representing the United People's Party Liberal, since 2021. Boro died from COVID-19 aged 63.
