= Barama Assembly constituency =

Constituency of the Assam legislative assembly in India

Coordinates: 26.53°N 91.35°E

Barama
- Former constituency No. 62 for the Assam Legislative Assembly

Constituency details
- Country: India
- Region: Northeast India
- State: Assam
- District: Baksa
- Lok Sabha constituency: Kokrajhar
- Established: 1951
- Abolished: 2023
- Reservation: ST

Barama Assembly constituency was one of the 126 assembly constituencies of Assam Legislative Assembly in Baksa District of lower Assam. Barama formed part of the Kokrajhar Lok Sabha constituency.

This constituency was abolished in 2023.

== Members of Legislative Assembly ==
- 1951: Part of 46 no. Patacharkuchi Barama Constituency (1) Homeswar Deb Choudhury Winner 1 Socialist Party, (2) Baikunthanath Das Winner 2 Indian National Congress. Voting took place in early 1952.
- 1957: Part of 45 no. Patacharkuchi Constituency (1) Birendra Kumar Das Winner 1 Praja Socialist Party, (2) Surendra Nath Das, Winner 2 Indian National Congress.

Election	Member	Party affiliation
1962	Surendra Nath Das	Indian National Congress
1967	Surendra Nath Das	Indian National Congress
1972	Surendra Nath Das	Indian National Congress
1978	Baikuntha Nath Das	Indian National Congress
1983	Alit Chandra Boro	Plain Tribals Council of Assam
1985	Rekha Rani Das Boro	Independent
1991	Pani Ram Rabha	Natun Asom Gana Parishad
1996	Rekha Rani Das Boro	Asom Gana Parishad
2001	Pani Ram Rabha	Indian National Congress
2006	Maneswar Brahma	Bodoland People's Front
2011	Maneswar Brahma	Bodoland People's Front
2016	Maneswar Brahma	Bodoland People's Front
2021	Bhupen Baro	United People's Party Liberal

== Election results ==
=== 2016 ===
2016 Assam Legislative Assembly election: Barama
Party	Candidate	Votes	%	±%
UPPL	Bhupen Baro			
Majority				
Turnout				
Registered electors				
UPPL gain from		Swing		
