= Munin Mahanta =

Indian politician

Member of Assam Legislative Assembly
- In office 1991–2001
- Preceded by: Harendra Bora
- Succeeded by: Jonjonali Baruah
- Constituency: Morigaon

Personal details
- Party: Communist Party of India
- Profession: Politician

Munin Mahanta is an Indian communist politician. He represented the Morigaon Assembly constituency in the Assam Legislative Assembly from 1991 to 2001. He is the Secretary of Communist Party of India Assam State Council. He is also a member of the National Executive of Communist Party of India.
