= Nirmal Kumar Brahma =

Indian politician

Member of Assam Legislative Assembly
- Incumbent
- Assumed office 2024
- Preceded by: Joyanta Basumatary
- Constituency: Sidli

Personal details
- Party: United People's Party, Liberal
- Profession: Politician

Nirmal Kumar Brahma is an Indian politician from Assam. He is a member of the Assam Legislative Assembly since 2024, representing Sidli Assembly constituency as a Member of United People's Party, Liberal.

== See also ==
- List of chief ministers of Assam
- Assam Legislative Assembly
