= Sidli Assembly constituency =

Constituency of the Assam legislative assembly in India

Coordinates: 26.53°N 90.45°E

Sidli
- Former constituency No. 31 for the Assam Legislative Assembly

Constituency details
- Country: India
- Region: Northeast India
- State: Assam
- District: Chirang
- Lok Sabha constituency: Kokrajhar
- Established: 1951
- Abolished: 2023
- Reservation: ST

Sidli Assembly constituency was one of the 126 constituencies of the Assam Legislative Assembly in India. Sidli formed a part of the Kokrajhar Lok Sabha constituency.

This constituency was abolished in 2023.

== Members of the Legislative Assembly ==
The list of the Members of the Legislative Assembly (MLA) representing Sidli constituency is as follows:

Year	Member	Party
1937	Rupnath Brahma	Indian National Congress
1946	Rupnath Brahma	Indian National Congress
1951	Rupnath Brahma	Indian National Congress
1962	Rupnath Brahma	Indian National Congress
1967	Uttam Brahma	Indian National Congress
1972	Uttam Brahma	Indian National Congress
1978	Panchanan Brahma	Plain Tribals Council of Assam
1983	Luis Islari	Indian National Congress
1985	Janendra Basumatary	Plain Tribals Council of Assam
1991	Khiren Borgoyary	Independent
1996	Andrias Hajoary	Independent
2001	Matindra Basumatary	Independent
2006	Chandan Brahma	Independent
2011	Chandan Brahma	Bodoland People's Front
2016	Chandan Brahma	Bodoland People's Front
2021	Joyanta Basumatary	United People's Party Liberal
2024^	Nirmal Kumar Brahma	United People's Party Liberal

^By-poll

== Election results ==
=== 2024 by-election ===
Assam Legislative Assembly by-election 2024: Sidli
Party	Candidate	Votes	%	±%
UPPL	Nirmal Kumar Brahma	95,243	57.80	
BPF	Shuddho Kumar Basumatary	58,227	35.34	
INC	Sanjib Warle	7,634	4.63	
NOTA	None of the Above	3,671	2.23	
Majority		37016		
Turnout		164,775		
UPPL hold		Swing		

=== 2016 ===
2016 Assam Legislative Assembly election: Sidli
Party	Candidate	Votes	%	±%
BPF	Chandan Brahma	75,860	41.99	
Independent	Rwngwra Narzary	46647	28.56	
Independent	Dilip Kumar Sarania	21,601	13.73	
AIUDF	Pankaj Islary	8,083	5.14	
Independent	Phalmarston Brahma	1,548	0.98	
NOTA	None of the above	2,929	1.86	
Majority		8,988	5.72	
Turnout		1,57,247	82.74	
Registered electors		1,90,029		
BPF hold		Swing		
