= Abul Kalam Azad (Indian politician) =

Politician from Assam, India

- Born: January 1, 1967 (age 59); Barpeta, Assam
- Occupation: All India United Democratic Front politician from Assam

Abul Kalam Azad (born 1 January 1967 in Barpeta, Assam) is an All India United Democratic Front politician from Assam. He was elected to Assam Legislative Assembly in the 2011 and 2016 elections from Bhabanipur constituency.
