= Tamulpur Assembly constituency =

Constituency of the Assam legislative assembly in India

Tamulpur
- Constituency No. 43 for the Assam Legislative Assembly

Constituency details
- Country: India
- Region: Northeast India
- State: Assam
- District: Tamulpur
- Lok Sabha constituency: Darrang–Udalguri
- Established: 1978
- Reservation: ST

Member of Legislative Assembly
- 16th Assam Legislative Assembly
- Incumbent Biswajit Daimary
- Party: Bharatiya Janata Party

Tamulpur Assembly constituency) is one of the 126 assembly constituencies of Assam Legislative Assembly. Tamulpur forms part of the Kokrajhar Lok Sabha constituency.

This constituency is reserved for the Scheduled Tribes candidates since 2023.

== Members of Legislative assembly ==
Year	Name	Party	Votes	Vote %	Margin
2021 (by-election)	Jolen Daimary	UPPL	86,678	59.62%	57,059
2021	Leho Ram Boro	UPPL	78,818	46.75%	32,183
2016	Emmanuel Moshahary	BPF	63,031	83%	19,947
2011	Emmanuel Moshahary	BPF	44,017	36%	4,608
2006	Chandi Basumatary	IND	37,131	31%	3,350
2001	Biswajit Daimary	IND	56,017	52%	16,854
1996	Derhagra Moshahary	IND	27,770	31%	7,681
1991	Derhagra Moshahary	IND	19,920	23%	7,863
1985	Bhaben Narzinary	IND	20,401	29%	7,112
1983	Padam Bahadur Chouhan	INC	12,566	41%	5,273
1978	Padam Bahadur Chouhan	JNP	12,960	29%	286

== Election results ==
=== 2026 ===
2026 Assam Legislative Assembly election: Tamulpur
Party	Candidate	Votes	%	±%
BJP	Biswajit Daimary	89308	49.92	
UPPL	Pramod Boro	62565	34.97	
INC	Rafie Daimary	16777	9.38	
NOTA	NOTA	2813	1.57	
Margin of victory		26743		
Turnout		178903		
Rejected ballots				
Registered electors				
BJP gain from UPPL		Swing		

=== 2021 by-election ===
2021 Assam Legislative Assembly By-Election: Tamulpur
Party	Candidate	Votes	%	±%
UPPL	Jolen Daimary	86,678	59.62	
Independent	Ganesh Kochari	29,619	20.67	
Gana Suraksha Party	Brajendra Nath Deka	13,573	9.34	
INC	Bhaskar Dahal	7,763	5.34	
Independent	Yashwanta Chouhan	3,035	2.09	
None of the Above	None of the Above	2,906	2	
VPI	Rajkumar Baro	1,814	1.25	
Majority		57,059	38.95	
Turnout		1,45,388		
UPPL hold		Swing		
