= Sheikh Shah Alam =

Indian politician

MLA of Goalpara West Vidhan Sabha Constituency
- In office 2001–2006
- Preceded by: Abu Bakar Siddique Jotdar
- Succeeded by: Abdur Rashid Mandal
- In office 2011–2016
- Preceded by: Abdur Rashid Mandal
- Succeeded by: Abdur Rashid Mandal

Personal details
- Party: Asom Gana Parishad

Sheikh Shah Alam is an Indian politician. In 2001 and 2011 he was elected as an MLA of Assam Legislative Assembly from Goalpara West Vidhan Sabha constituency. He was an All India United Democratic Front politician. He joined Asom Gana Parishad on 5 July 2019.
