= Jolen Daimary =

Indian politician

Member of the Assam Legislative Assembly
- In office 2021–2026
- Preceded by: Leho Ram Boro
- Constituency: Tamulpur

Personal details
- Party: United People's Party Liberal
- Education: B.A. from Howly Junior College
- Occupation: Social Entrepreneur & Self Employed

Jolen Daimary is an Indian politician from Assam. Daimary is the MLA of the Assam Legislative Assembly from Tamulpur as a member of the United People's Party Liberal. He won the 2021 elections by-elections for Tamulpur after Leho Ram Boro died of COVID-19 in 2021.
