= Joyanta Basumatary =

Indian politician

Member of Parliament, Lok Sabha
- Incumbent
- Assumed office 4 June 2024
- Preceded by: Naba Kumar Sarania
- Constituency: Kokrajhar

Personal details
- Party: United People's Party Liberal
- Profession: Politician

Joyanta Basumatary is an Indian politician and a member of the United People's Party Liberal (UPPL) from Assam. He is an MLA, from the Sidli constituency of Assam legislative assembly since 2021. He contested the 2024 Indian general election from the Kokrajhar Lok Sabha constituency and won on the UPPL ticket.
