= Ashok Kumar Singhi =

Indian politician

Ashok Kumar Singhi is a Bharatiya Janata Party politician from Assam. He has been elected to the Assam Legislative Assembly in the 2016 elections from Bilasipara East.
