= Keshab Chandra Gogoi ministry =

Government of Assam, India in 1982

- Date established: 13 January 1982
- Date dissolved: 19 March 1982

Leadership and composition
- Governor: Prakash Mehrotra
- Chief Minister: Keshab Chandra Gogoi
- Member party: INC; JP; IND
- Status in legislature: Coalition
- Opposition leader: Sarat Chandra Singha

Formation and history
- Predecessor: President's rule
- Successor: President's rule

The ministry of Keshab Chandra Gogoi was formed on 13 January 1982. The formation of the ministry ended 197 days of President’s rule in Assam. The ministry ended after only 66 days, after Gogoi resigned during a motion of no confidence vote. Gogoi then recommended that the state again be put under President’s Rule.

== History ==
=== Formation ===
President’s Rule was imposed in Assam after the Anwara Taimur government failed to get the Assam appropriation bill passed by the assembly. On 12 January 1982, Gogoi told the press that he had the backing of 63 MLAs. Gogoi stated "I cannot reveal the identities of the 63 legislators whose support I enjoy for obvious reasons. But I am confident I will prove my majority on the floor of the House." Gogoi then contested for the Leadership.

The Taimur Camp had encouraged Hiteswar Saikia to contest Gogoi’s claim but an opinion poll before the final selection revealed only supporters of Saikia among the 35 partymen assembled while 24 favoured Gogoi and 3 remained neutral. Hours before the selection meeting, 4 Taimur supporters resigned from the party.

Governor Prakash Mehrotra accepted Gogoi’s claim that he had the support of 63 MLAs and he was sworn in as Chief Minister of Assam on 13 January 1982 at Raj Bhavan in a simple ceremony. He constituted his Left-Janata coalition ministry on 13 January 1982. For many MLAs support of the new government was fear that the Assembly may be dissolved if they don't.

=== Changes ===
On 30 January, the ministry was expanded, with two ministers, Sonaram Thaosen and Dhaniram Rongpi, being sworn-in by Mehrotra. They were included in the initial Gogoi cabinet list, but were not allocated portfolios or sworn-in until 30 January.

Revenue minister Ramesh Chandra Saharia died on 8 February.

On 8 March, the ministry gained wider representation with five more ministers being sworn-in. Congress MLAs Ranendra Basumatari, Joy Chandra Nagbanshi, and Plain Tribals Council of Assam (PTCA) MLA Samar Brahma Choudhury were appointed to cabinet. Kaliram Dekaraja and Aklius Tirkey were appointed ministers of state. The government composition subsequently changed to fourteen cabinet ministers, four ministers of state and one deputy minister.

=== Motion of No-confidence ===
On 17 March 1982 a Motion of No Confidence was moved against the 65-day-old ministry. Sarat Chandra Singha, Golap Borbora, Hemen Das, Promode Gogoi, Zainal Abedin, Premadhar Bora and Ramesh Mohan Kouli jointly filed the motion. The speaker admitted it and fixed discussion for 18 March 1982. However, the speaker adjourned the house sine die after he learned Gogoi tendered in his resignation to the Governor. The opposition had a majority in the house however the Governor chose to dissolve the legislative assembly on advice of Gogoi.

Gogoi, when asked why he recommended the assembly’s dissolution, said "I had no other alternative. If I did not make such a recommendation then the Governor would have had no other alternative but to allow the Opposition to form a ministry." Opposition leader and former Chief Minister Sarat Chandra Singha called this "sheer fascism". On 19 March, the President Sanjiva Reddy then issued a proclamation which dissolved the legislative assembly and brought the state under President's rule.

== Ministry ==
=== Cabinet ===
Portfolio	Minister	Took office	Left office	Party	Constituency
Chief Minister and also in-charge of: Department of Home; Department of Administrative Reforms; Department of Information and Public Relations; Department of Khadi and Village Industries; Department of Rural Development; Department of Public Works; Department of Tourism; And all other departments and subjects not allocated to any other minister.	Keshab Chandra Gogoi	13 January 1982	19 March 1982	INC	Dibrugarh
Minister of Finance; Minister of Minority Affairs; Minister of Political Sufferers	Mohammed Idris	13 January 1982	19 March 1982	INC	Rupohihat
Minister of Irrigation; Minister of Fisheries; Minister of Scheduled Castes and Tribal Welfare	Rabindra Nath Choudhury	13 January 1982	19 March 1982	JP	Abhayapuri South
Minister of Education; Minister of Cultural Affairs	Hiteswar Saikia	13 January 1982	19 March 1982	INC	Nazira
Minister of Revenue; Minister of Food and Civil Supplies	Ramesh Chandra Saharia	13 January 1982	8 February 1982	IND	Panery
Minister of Flood Control; Minister of Judicial and Legislative Affairs	Altaf Hussain Mazumdar	13 January 1982	19 March 1982	INC	Barkhola
Minister of Agriculture; Minister of Town and Country Planning	Santi Ranjan Das Gupta	13 January 1982	19 March 1982	JP	Hojai
Minister of Industry; Minister of Public Enterprises	Jagannath Singh	13 January 1982	19 March 1982	JP	Udharbond
Minister of Power; Minister of Mines and Minerals; Minister of Parliamentary Affairs	Golok Rajbanshi	13 January 1982	19 March 1982	INC	Rangapara
Minister of Animal Husbandry and Veterinary; Minister of Municipal Administration; Minister of Community Development	Zahirul Islam	13 January 1982	19 March 1982	JP	Mankachar
Minister of Soil Conservation; Minister of Printing and Stationery; Minister of Registration and Stamps	Sonaram Thaosen	30 January 1982	19 March 1982	JP	Haflong
Minister of Hills Area Development; Minister of Sericulture and Weaving	Dhaniram Rongpi	30 January 1982	19 March 1982	INC	Baithalangso
Minister of Public Works; Minister of Jails	Ranendra Basumatari	8 March 1982	19 March 1982	INC	Kokrajhar West
Minister of Cooperation; Minister of Excise	Joy Chandra Nagbanshi	8 March 1982	19 March 1982	INC	Moran
Minister of Forest; Minister of Public Health Engineering	Samar Brahma Choudhury	8 March 1982	19 March 1982	PTC	Kokrajhar East

=== Junior ministers ===
Portfolio	Minister	Took office	Left office	Party	Constituency
Minister of State for Transport; Minister of State for Tourism	Padam Bahadur Chouhan	13 January 1982	19 March 1982	JP	Tamulpur
Minister of State for Rural Development; Minister of State for Social Welfare	A. N. Akram Hussain	13 January 1982	19 March 1982	INC	Chaygaon
Minister of State for Revenue; Minister of State for Tribal Areas	Kaliram Dekaraja	8 March 1982	19 March 1982	INC	Morigaon
Minister of State for Welfare of Scheduled Castes and Scheduled Tribes; Minister of State for Labour	Aklius Tirkey	8 March 1982	19 March 1982	INC	Sarupathar
Deputy Minister of Education	Mohammed Fokhrul Islam	13 January 1982	19 March 1982	IND	Patharkandi
