= Kokrajhar West Assembly constituency =

Constituency of the Assam legislative assembly in India

Coordinates: 26.40°N 90.27°E

Kokrajhar West
- Former constituency No. 29 for the Assam Legislative Assembly

Constituency details
- Country: India
- Region: Northeast India
- State: Assam
- District: Kokrajhar
- Lok Sabha constituency: Kokrajhar
- Established: 1967
- Abolished: 2023
- Reservation: ST

Kokrajhar West Assembly constituency was one of the 126 constituencies of the Assam Legislative Assembly in India. Kokrajhar West formed a part of the Kokrajhar Lok Sabha constituency.

This constituency was abolished in 2023.

== Members of Legislative Assembly ==
Year	Winner	Party
1967	Ranendra Narayan Basumatary	Indian National Congress
1972	Charan Narzary	Plain Tribals Council of Assam
1978	Ranendra Narayan Basumatary	Indian National Congress
1983	Ranendra Narayan Basumatary	Indian National Congress
1985	Amrit Lal Basumatary	Indian Congress
1991	Parameswar Brahma	Independent politician
1996	Hemendra Nath Brahma	Independent politician
2001	Hemendra Nath Brahma	Independent politician
2006	Parameswar Brahma	Independent politician
2011	Pradip Kumar Brahma	Bodoland People's Front
2016	Rabiram Narzary	Bodoland People's Front
2021	Rabiram Narzary	Bodoland People's Front

== Election results ==
=== 2021 ===
2021 Assam Legislative Assembly election: Kokrajhar West
Party	Candidate	Votes	%	±%
BPF	Rabiram Narzary	77,509	50.20	+4.07
UPPL	Manaranjan Brahma	65,438	42.38	N/A
Independent	Kaushik Mohan Brahma	6,662	4.31	New
Independent	Ranjay Kr. Brahma	1,832	1.19	+0.74
Independent	Gautam Baro	1,166	0.75	New
JD(U)	Ranendra Koch	938	0.61	New
The National Road Map Party of India	Rajendra Mushahary	842	0.54	New
NOTA	None of the above	1,645	1.06	+0.14
Margin of victory		12,071	7.82	−4.60
Turnout		1,54,387	87.97	+0.41
Registered electors		1,77,372		+11.21
BPF hold		Swing		

=== 2016 ===
2016 Assam Legislative Assembly election: Kokrajhar West
Party	Candidate	Votes	%	±%
BPF	Rabiram Narzary	64,423	46.13	−11.40
AIUDF	Dahit Chandra Brahma	47,083	33.71	New
Independent	Urkhao Gwra Brahma	18,629	13.34	−17.89
Independent	Nilima Brahma	3,545	2.54	New
Independent	Bhadreswar Brahma	1,437	1.03	New
Independent	Mukunda Koch	1,116	0.80	New
Independent	Subhadra Narzary	1,044	0.75	New
Independent	Sujila Basumatary	977	0.70	New
Independent	Aruna Brahma	775	0.55	New
Independent	Ranjay Kr. Brahma	627	0.45	New
NOTA	None of the above	1,285	0.92	N/A
Margin of victory		17,340	12.42	−13.93
Turnout		1,39,656	87.56	+6.21
Registered electors		1,59,496		+8.52
BPF hold		Swing		

=== 2011 ===
2011 Assam Legislative Assembly election: Kokrajhar West
Party	Candidate	Votes	%	±%
BPF	Pradip Kumar Brahma	68,838	57.57	
Independent	Urkhao Gwra Brahma	37,335	31.23	N/A
INC	Lahendra Basumatary	9,107	7.62	N/A
AITC	Pradip Kr. Brahma	4,280	3.58	N/A
Margin of victory		31,503	26.35	
Turnout		1,19,560	81.35	
Registered electors		1,46,968		
BPF gain from Independent		Swing		

== See also ==
- List of constituencies of the Assam Legislative Assembly
