= Kokrajhar East Assembly constituency =

Constituency of the Assam legislative assembly in India

Coordinates: 26.410°N 90.281°E

Kokrajhar East
- Former constituency No. 30 for the Assam Legislative Assembly

Constituency details
- Country: India
- Region: Northeast India
- State: Assam
- District: Kokrajhar
- Lok Sabha constituency: Kokrajhar
- Established: 1967
- Abolished: 2023
- Reservation: ST

Kokrajhar East Assembly constituency was one of 126 assembly constituencies of Assam, a northeastern state in India. Kokrajhar East was part of the Kokrajhar Lok Sabha constituency.

This constituency was abolished in 2023. It was split to form the new Kokrajhar, Dotma and Baokhungri constituencies.

== Members of Legislative Assembly ==
Year	Winner	Party
1967	Rani Manjula Devi	Indian National Congress
1973	Sarat Chandra Sinha	Indian National Congress
1978	Samar Brahma Choudhury	Plain Tribals Council of Assam
1983	Dambarudhar Brahma	Indian National Congress
1985	Charan Narzary	Plain Tribals Council of Assam
1991	Pramila Rani Brahma	Independent politician
1996	Pramila Rani Brahma	Independent politician
2001	Pramila Rani Brahma	Independent politician
2006	Pramila Rani Brahma	Independent politician
2011	Pramila Rani Brahma	Bodoland People's Front
2016	Pramila Rani Brahma	Bodoland People's Front
2021	Lawrence Islary	United People's Party Liberal

== Election results ==
=== 2021 ===
2021 Assam Legislative Assembly election: Kokrajhar East
Party	Candidate	Votes	%	±%
UPPL	Lawrence Islary	83,515	54.81	N/A
BPF	Pramila Rani Brahma	63,420	41.62	−13.72
Independent	Manaj Kumar Brahma	3,264	2.14	New
Independent	Mijing Brahma	1,276	0.84	New
Independent	Sailendra Nath Brahma	897	0.59	New
NOTA	None of the above	1,883	1.23	−0.42
Majority		20,095	13.19	−15.82
Turnout		152,372	83.79	+0.03
Registered electors		181,852		+10.20
UPPL gain from BPF		Swing	-0.53	

=== 2016 ===
2016 Assam Legislative Assembly election: Kokrajhar East
Party	Candidate	Votes	%	±%
BPF	Pramila Rani Brahma	76,496	55.34	−10.79
Independent	Pratibha Brahma	36,405	26.33	New
AIUDF	Manu Borgayary	12,588	9.10	New
Independent	Basanta Kumar Medhi	6,994	5.05	New
Independent	Ajay Kumar Narzary	1,816	1.31	New
Independent	Rajesh Narzary	1,642	1.18	New
NOTA	None of the above	2,288	1.65	N/A
Majority		40,091	29.01	−11.64
Turnout		1,38,229	83.76	+7.21
Registered electors		1,65,022		+11.88
BPF hold		Swing		

=== 2011 ===
2011 Assam Legislative Assembly election: Kokrajhar East
Party	Candidate	Votes	%	±%
BPF	Pramila Rani Brahma	74,670	66.13	
Independent	Kishore Basumatary	36,405	25.48	
INC	Rajeswar Brahma	4,571	4.05	
AITC	Biswajit Narzary	2,756	2.44	
JD(U)	Subhadra Narzary	2,147	1.90	
Majority		45,904	40.65	
Turnout		1,12,910	76.55	
Registered electors		1,47,500		
BPF hold		Swing		

== See also ==
- Kokrajhar
- List of constituencies of Assam Legislative Assembly
