= Pramila Rani Brahma =

Indian politician

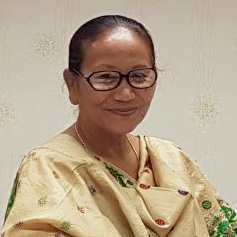
- Official Portrait, 2016

Cabinet Minister, Assam
- In office 24 May 2016 – 10 May 2021
- Chief Minister: Sarbananda Sonowal
- Departments: Soil Conservation; Environment and Forests (2016–18); Welfare of Plain Tribes and Backward Classes (2016–18); Mines and Minerals (2016–18); Social Welfare (2018–2021)
- Preceded by: Chandan Kumar Sarkar (Soil); Atuwa Munda (Environment); Girindra Mallik (Mines); Sarbananda Sonowal (Social Welfare)
- Succeeded by: Urkhao Gwra Brahma (Soil); Parimal Suklabaidya (Environment); Chandan Brahma (WPT&BC); Sum Ronghang (Mines); Ajanta Neog (Social Welfare)
- In office 21 May 2006 – 18 May 2011
- Chief Minister: Tarun Gogoi
- Departments: Agriculture; Welfare of Plain Tribes and Backward Classes
- Preceded by: Ardhendu Kumar Dey (Agriculture)
- Succeeded by: Nilamani Sen Deka (Agriculture); Chandan Brahma (WPT&BC, only BTAD); Rajib Lochan Pegu (WPT&BC, non-BTAD)

Member, Assam Legislative Assembly
- In office 25 June 1991 – 10 May 2021
- Preceded by: Charan Narzary
- Succeeded by: Lawrence Islary
- Constituency: Kokrajhar East (ST)

Personal details
- Born: 1951 (age 74–75)
- Party: Bodoland People's Front
- Education: Kokrajhar College (B.A)
- Occupation: Politician
- Profession: Social worker and politician

Pramila Rani Brahma (born 1951) is a Bodo politician and social worker from Assam who was a member of the Assam Legislative Assembly from Kokrajhar East constituency as a member of the Bodoland People's Front from 1991 to 2021 and the State Minister of Forest and Environment, Soil Conservation and Mines and Mineral Departments in the Sarbananda Sonowal ministry from 2016 to 2019 and the State Minister of Agriculture and Welfare of Plain Tribes and Backward Castes in the Tarun Gogoi ministry from 2006 to 2010.

== Electoral history ==
=== Lok Sabha election ===
Year	Constituency	Party	Votes	%	Opponent		Result	Margin
2019	Kokrajhar (ST)	BPF	446,774	30.2%	Heera Saraniya	Independent	Lost	37,786

=== Legislative Assembly elections ===
Year	Constituency	Party	Votes	%	Opponent		Result	Margin
1991	Kokrajhar East (ST)	Independent	66,390	79.2%	Dhwajendra Brahma	INC	Won	54,699
1996	Kokrajhar East (ST)	Independent	37,553	45.1%	Chitta Ranjan Brahma	Independent	Won	19,723
2001	Kokrajhar East (ST)	Independent	90,553	81.9%	Charan Narzary	INC	Won	76,175
2006	Kokrajhar East (ST)	BPF	47,978	46.0%	Rabiram Narzary	Independent	Won	2,235
2011	Kokrajhar East (ST)	BPF	74,670	66.1%	Kishore Basumatary	Independent	Won	45,904
2016	Kokrajhar East (ST)	BPF	76,496	56.3%	Pratibha Brahma	Independent	Won	40,091
2021	Kokrajhar East (ST)	BPF	63,420	41.6%	Lawrence Islary	UPPL	Lost	20,095
