= Indreswar Khaund =

Indian politician (1917–2019)

Minister for the Public Works Department
- In office c.1977–1977
- Chief Minister: Sarat Chandra Sinha

Minister for Transport
- In office c.1975–c.1977
- Chief Minister: Sarat Chandra Sinha

Deputy Minister for Cooperative, Cottage Industries, Sericulture, Weaving and Transport
- In office 22 April 1957 – 27 December 1957
- Chief Minister: Bishnuram Medhi
Assembly positions
Member of Assam Legislative Assembly
In office 1972–1978
Preceded by	Manick Chandra Das
Succeeded by	Constituency abolished
Constituency	Tengakhat
In office 1962–1967
Preceded by	Jugo Kanta Barua
Succeeded by	Constituency abolished
Constituency	Jaipur
In office 1957–1962
Preceded by	Constituency established
Succeeded by	Upendra Nath Santan
Constituency	Bogdung
In office 1952–1957
Preceded by	Constituency established
Succeeded by	Constituency abolished
Constituency	Tinsukia North

Personal details
- Born: 27 November 1917 Dibrugarh, Assam Province, British India
- Died: 31 January 2019 (aged 101) Dibrugarh, Assam, India
- Party: Indian National Congress
- Spouse: Punya Prabha Gogoi (m. 1953; died 2001)
- Children: 4
- Parent: N.R. Khaund (Father)

Indreswar Khaund (27 November 1917 – 31 January 2019) was an Indian statesman and lawyer who served as a Member of Assam Legislative Assembly (MLA), and cabinet minister.

== Early life, education and career ==
Khaund was born on 27 November 1917 in Chetiapather village, in Dibrugarh. He was of the Mottock Community, as the son of N.R. Khaund.

Khaund began his education at Chabua Primary school, and then attended the Public High English School in Dibrugarh. He passed the matriculation exam from the Soniram government aided High English School. He graduated from Cotton College in 1945, and from Earle Law College in 1948. He subsequently worked as a lawyer in Dibrugarh.

== Political career ==
Khaund was elected MLA for Tinsukia North in the 1952 election, and then for Bogdung in the 1957 election. He was then elected for Jaipur in 1962, and Tengakhat in 1972.

Khaund was appointed Deputy Minister for Cooperative, Cottage Industries, Sericulture, Weaving and Transport under Bishnuram Medhi in 1957. He later served as Minister for Transport and Minister for the Public Works Department under Sarat Chandra Sinha.

== Personal life ==
Khaund married Punya Prabha Gogoi in 1953, and together they had three daughters and one son. They remained married until her death in 2001.

Khaund turned 100 in 2017.

== Death and funeral ==
On 31 January 2019, Khaund died at the age of 101, at his residence in Naliapool, Dibrugarh. Former speaker and minister Prithibi Majhi, former union minister Paban Singh Ghatowar, and former minister Atuwa Munda were among those who paid tribute to Khaund.

Khaund was cremated with full state honours, and his last rites were performed on 1 February at Chokidinghi crematorium, attended by various senior Dibrugarh officials and Khaund's family.
