= Sarat Chandra Sinha ministry =

Government of Assam, India from 1972 to 1978

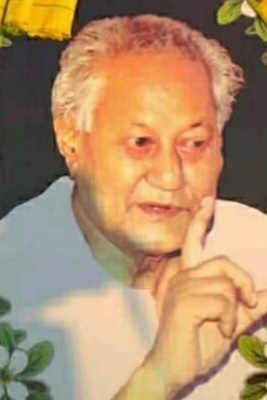
- Sarat Chandra Sinha, Chief Minister of Assam
- Date formed: 31 January 1972
- Date dissolved: 12 March 1978

People and organisations
- Head of state: Braj Kumar Nehru; Lallan Prasad Singh
- Head of government: Sarat Chandra Sinha
- Member party: INC

History
- Predecessor: Choudhry ministry
- Successor: Borbora ministry

The Ministry of Sarat Chandra Sinha for Assam, India was formed on 31 January 1972. The ministry was dissolved on 12 March 1978.

== Cabinet Ministers ==
Name	Constituency	Department	Party
Sarat Chandra Sinha Chief Minister	Kokrajhar East	Appointment; Home; Political; Finance; General Administration; Secretariat Administration; Statistics; Flood Control and Irrigation; Matters relating to election; Information and Public Relations; Planning and Development; General Co-ordination of all departments; Other departments not allocated to any Minister	INC
Cabinet Ministers
Syed Ahmed Ali	Gauripur	Law; Relief and Rehabilitation; Municipal Administration; Town and Country Planning; Panchayat including Community Development; Parliamentary Affairs; Registration and stamps	INC
Paramananda Gogoi	Tinsukia	Revenue and Forests	INC
Gajen Tanti	Mariani	Labour; Cooperation	INC
Mohammed Idris	Rupohihat	Industries including cottage industries; Power; Mines and Minerals; Trade and Commerce; Wakf Property; Sericulture and Weaving	INC
Mahitosh Purkayastha	Silchar	Supply; Printing and stationery; Khadi and village industries; Political sufferers; Excise	INC
Lutfur Rahman	Barkhola	PWD (R & B)	INC
Upendra Das	Rangamati	Agriculture; Fisheries	INC
Uttam Chandra Brahma	Sidli	Social Welfare; Welfare of Backward Classes; Soil Conservation	INC
Harendra Nath Talukdar	Palasbari	Education; Student and youth welfare; Cultural Affairs; Transport; Tourism	INC
Chatrasing Teron	Howraghat	Health; Family Planning; Tribal Areas Department	INC
Joy Bhadra Hagjer	Haflong	Live stock; Veterinary; Jail; Minority Affairs	INC
Ministers of State
Hiteswar Saikia	Nazira	Home; Health; Family Planning; Information; Public relations; Youth Welfare; Cultural Affairs	INC
Bishnu Prasad	Samaguri	F.C.&I; Power and industries; Trade and commerce	INC
Swarna Prava Mahanta	Sootea	Social welfare; Sericulture and weaving	INC
