= Ranendra Basumatari =

Indian politician (born 1936)

Minister for Public Works and Jails
- In office 8 March 1982 – 19 March 1982
- Chief Minister: Keshab Chandra Gogoi

Member of Assam Legislative Assembly
- In office 1978–1985
- Preceded by: Charan Narzary
- Succeeded by: Amrit Lal Basumatary
- Constituency: Kokrajhar West
- In office 1967–1972
- Preceded by: Constituency established
- Succeeded by: Charan Narzary
- Constituency: Kokrajhar West

Personal details
- Born: 1 October 1936 (age 89)
- Party: Indian National Congress
- Spouse: Joyti Rani Basumatari
- Children: 4

Ranendra Narayan Basumatari (born 1 October 1936) is an Indian politician from Assam who was the Member of Assam Legislative Assembly (MLA) for Kokrajhar West from 1978 to 1983. He served as Minister for Public Works and Jails in 1982 under Keshab Chandra Gogoi.

== Political career ==
He was elected MLA for Kokrajhar West in 1978 and 1983. He served as Minister for Public Works and Jails in 1982 under Kesab Chandra Gogoi. He also served in other ministries.

== Family ==
Basumatari married Joyti Rani Basumatari and they had four children together.
