= 1985 Assam Legislative Assembly election =

- 24 December 1985

126 seats in the Assam Legislative Assembly 64 seats needed for a majority
- Registered: 11,892,170
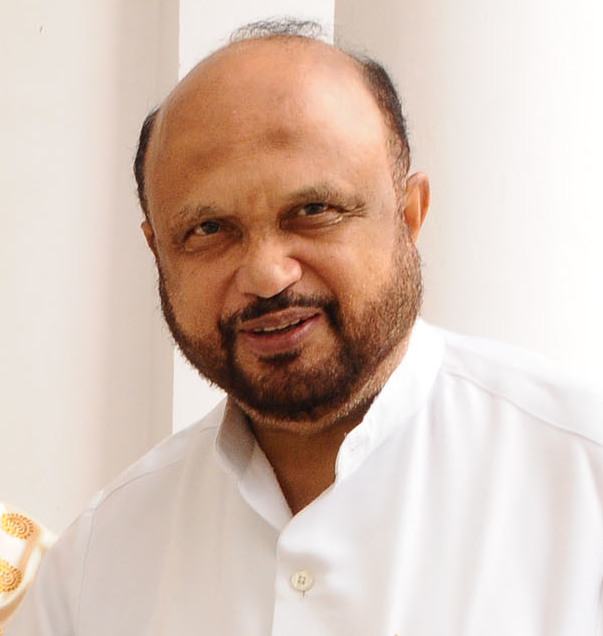

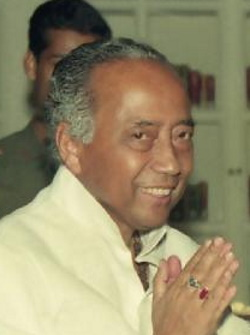
	Majority party	Minority party
Leader	Prafulla Kumar Mahanta	Hiteswar Saikia
Party	AGP	INC
Seats before	New	91
Seats won	92	26
Seat change	New	▼65
Popular vote	38.9	23.2
CM before election
Hiteswar Saikia
Indian National Congress
Elected CM
Prafulla Kumar Mahanta
AGP

The 8th Assam Legislative Assembly election was held in two phases in December 1985 to elect members from 126 constituencies in Assam, India.

The legislatively assembly elections represented the culmination of the six-year Assam Movement from 1979 to 1985. The Assam Accord between the agitation leaders and the Government of India ended a period of sustained civil disobedience campaigns, political instability and ethnic violence. The agitation leaders contested the election as independents affiliated with the All Assam Students' Union and joined the Asom Gana Parishad floated at the Golaghat Convention before the elections. Asom Gana Parishad party president, Prafulla Kumar Mahanta, became the Chief Minister of Assam.

The elections were fought amidst tense ethnic and sectarian relations. Dilip Chakraborty, a leader of the Bengali minority community, moved the Supreme Court in a writ petition claiming that the accord was violative of Articles 14 and 21 of the Constitution as well as of the Citizenship Act (1955).

The Assamese Hindus largely supported the Asom Gana Parishad, but many tribals voted also for the Plain Tribals Council of Assam. The Bengali Muslims largely supported the United Minorities Front, and the Bengali Hindus largely supported the Communist Party of India (Marxist). The Indian National Congress passed the IMDT Act after the 1983 Assam Legislative Assembly elections, but failed to retain the support of the Bengali immigrant population. Other national parties such as the Janata Party and the Bharatiya Janata Party suffered a rout. The Indian Congress (Socialist) led by former Chief Minister of Assam, Sarat Chandra Sinha, cut into the Indian National Congress vote.

== Results ==
#	Party	Contested	Seats	Swing
1	Independent Politician	104	92	▲82
2	Indian National Congress	125	25	▼66
3	Indian Congress (Socialist)	72	4	▲2
4	Plain Tribals Council of Assam	28	3	▲2
5	Communist Party of India (Marxist)	39	2	-
Total		1,133	126	

== Elected members ==
Constituency		Winner				Runner Up				Margin	%
#	Name	Candidate	Party	Votes	%	Candidate	Party	Votes	%	Margin	%
1	Ratabari (SC)	Kumari Rabidas	INC	28,802	51.18	Kamdeb Das	CPI(M)	20,763	36.89	8,039	14.29
2	Patharkandi	Monilal Gowala	INC	29,695	43.68	Naba Rajkumar	IND	17,016	25.03	12,679	18.65
3	Karimganj North	Sirajul Hoque Choudhury	IND	23,511	34.72	Nishith Das	CPI(M)	22,054	32.57	1,457	2.15
4	Karimganj South	Abdul Muqtadir Choudhury	INC	24,002	37.93	Nikhil Kanti Das	IND	20,554	32.48	3,448	5.45
5	Badarpur	Ramendra De	CPI(M)	18,707	35.31	Kamal Uddin Ahmed	IND	13,394	25.28	5,313	10.03
6	Hailakandi	Abdul Muhib Majumder	INC	27,969	52.05	Abdul Khaleque Laskar	CPI(M)	11,535	21.47	16,434	30.58
7	Katlicherra	Gautam Roy (Tulsi)	INC	40,940	59.30	Tazamul Ali Laskar	IND	24,958	36.15	15,982	23.15
8	Algapur	Sahidul Alam Choudhury	IND	16,183	31.45	Jalaluddin Choudhury	INC	11,448	22.24	4,735	9.21
9	Silchar	Karnendu Bhattacharjee	INC	34,987	47.90	Kabindra Purkayastha	BJP	21,501	29.44	13,486	18.46
10	Sonai	Abdul Rob Laskar	INC	56,190	74.63	Jitendra Nath Choudhury	IC(S)	9,636	12.80	46,554	61.83
11	Dholai (SC)	Digendra Purkayastha	INC	20,410	35.69	Kamakhya Prasad Malaho	IND	20,003	34.98	407	0.71
12	Udharbond	Joy Prakash Tewari	IND	27,726	51.74	Jagannath Singh	INC	21,802	40.69	5,924	11.05
13	Lakhipur	Dinesh Prasad Goala	INC	21,910	33.61	Kshiro Gopal Misra	IND	13,985	21.45	7,925	12.16
14	Barkhola	Altaf Hussain Mazumdar	INC	20,670	37.70	Sashanka Sekhar Nath	BJP	14,497	26.44	6,173	11.26
15	Katigora	Abdul Hamid Mazumdar	IC(S)	31,245	47.26	Nepal Chandra Das	INC	24,897	37.66	6,348	9.60
16	Haflong (ST)	Gobinda Chndra Langthasa	INC	29,205	61.24	Ijiranbe	IND	12,241	25.67	16,964	35.57
17	Bokajan (ST)	Rajen Timung	INC	10,139	30.48	Dhani Ram Teron	IND	9,748	29.30	391	1.18
18	Howraghat (ST)	Khorsing Engti	IND	13,275	36.92	Dorsing Terong	INC	9,199	25.58	4,076	11.34
19	Diphu (ST)	Sam Singh Hanse	IND	10,435	26.46	Bidyasing Engleng	INC	9,273	23.52	1,162	2.94
20	Baithalangso (ST)	Holiram Terang	IND	17,536	35.04	Dhani Ram Rongpi	INC	15,400	30.77	2,136	4.27
21	Mankachar	Aminul Islam	IND	24,098	38.00	Zahirul Islam	INC	24,093	37.99	5	0.01
22	Salmara South	Dewan Joynal Abedin	IND	42,192	70.52	Bazlul Basit	INC	7,603	12.71	34,589	57.81
23	Dhubri	Mosir Uddin Sheikh	INC	19,368	32.78	Saber Ali Sheikh	CPI(M)	10,785	18.25	8,583	14.53
24	Gauripur	Aniruddha Singha Chowdhury	IND	17,773	27.10	Kazi Abul Hosen	INC	14,405	21.97	3,368	5.13
25	Golakganj	Dalim Ray	IND	30,495	46.65	Alauddin Sarkar	CPI	27,977	42.80	2,518	3.85
26	Bilasipara West	Yusuf Ali Ahmed	IND	22,130	42.58	Giasuddin Ahmed	CPI	14,474	27.85	7,656	14.73
27	Bilasipara East	Sarat Chandra Sinha	IC(S)	26,214	42.10	Phanindra Ray	IND	19,725	31.68	6,489	10.42
28	Gossaigaon	Mithias Tudu	INC	21,548	39.52	Helen Murmu	IND	7,826	14.35	13,722	25.17
29	Kokrajhar West (ST)	Amrit Lal Basumatary	IC(S)	17,447	31.08	Ranendra Narayan Basumatari	INC	11,785	20.99	5,662	10.09
30	Kokrajhar East (ST)	Charan Narzary	PTC	24,473	40.14	Dambarudhar Brahma	INC	16,615	27.25	7,858	12.89
31	Sidli (ST)	Janendra Basumatary	PTC	31,371	47.51	Luis Islary	INC	20,507	31.06	10,864	16.45
32	Bongaigaon	Phani Bhoosan Chaudhary	IND	27,068	47.13	Guru Charan Singha	CPI(M)	13,630	23.73	13,438	23.40
33	Bijni	Ganesh Bora	PTC	13,846	26.93	Parimal Chakraborty	CPI(M)	12,852	25.00	994	1.93
34	Abhayapuri North	Mokbul Hussain	IND	22,526	41.89	Bhupen Roy	IND	16,689	31.03	5,837	10.86
35	Abhayapuri South (SC)	Ratneswar Sarkar	IND	29,742	47.66	Rabin Banikya	IND	25,235	40.44	4,507	7.22
36	Dudhnai (ST)	Akan Chandra Rabha	IND	26,502	43.36	Dinesh Khakhlary	IND	9,690	15.85	16,812	27.51
37	Goalpara East	Maziruddin Ahmed	IND	27,862	41.20	Mono Mohan Das	IND	25,993	38.44	1,869	2.76
38	Goalpara West	Sheikh Saman Ali	IND	27,018	42.16	Prafulla Kumar Rabha	IND	21,181	33.05	5,837	9.11
39	Jaleswar	Afzalur Rahman	IND	33,663	60.92	Samaul Haque	INC	11,394	20.62	22,269	40.30
40	Sorbhog	Hemen Das	CPI(M)	26,158	39.33	David Ledger	IND	18,489	27.80	7,669	11.53
41	Bhabanipur	Surendra Nath Medhi	IND	28,545	48.62	Kanak Chandra Boro	IND	13,375	22.78	15,170	25.84
42	Patacharkuchi	Pabin Ch. Deka	IND	67,428	92.01	Nagen Pathak	INC	4,229	5.77	63,199	86.24
43	Barpeta	Kumar Deepak Das	IND	43,908	52.95	Tamijuddin Ahmed	IND	35,803	43.17	8,105	9.78
44	Jania	A.F.Golam Osmani	IND	47,693	75.48	Kaji Anowar Hussain	IND	5,438	8.61	42,255	66.87
45	Baghbar	Sheikh A. Hamid	IND	30,747	57.71	Jalaluddin	IND	15,427	28.96	15,320	28.75
46	Sarukhetri	Dinabandhu Choudhury	IND	39,088	51.40	Samir Khan	IND	26,397	34.71	12,691	16.69
47	Chenga	Muktar Hussain	IND	19,412	37.17	Md. Laikat Ali Khan	IND	15,289	29.27	4,123	7.90
48	Boko (SC)	Gopinat Das	IND	30,564	43.81	Jugal K.Saikia	IND	26,383	37.82	4,181	5.99
49	Chaygaon	Kamla Kalita	IND	32,751	53.46	Abdul Qayyum Al Aman	IND	23,053	37.63	9,698	15.83
50	Palasbari	Jatin Mali	IND	57,029	84.82	Girin Thakuria	INC	5,763	8.57	51,266	76.25
51	Jalukbari	Bhrigu Kumar Phukan	IND	45,086	65.11	Dwijendra Nath Sarma	INC	10,289	14.86	34,797	50.25
52	Dispur	Atul Bora	IND	45,803	62.13	Munindra Gautam	INC	17,954	24.35	27,849	37.78
53	Gauhati East	Biraj Kumar Sarma	IND	45,941	58.03	Phani Sarma	INC	27,040	34.15	18,901	23.88
54	Gauhati West	Ramendra Narayan Kalita	IND	43,149	59.89	Jai Kr. Jain	INC	15,170	21.06	27,979	38.83
55	Hajo	Kamakhya Charan Choudhury	IND	47,660	67.01	Md. Shaukat Ali	INC	16,390	23.04	31,270	43.97
56	Kamalpur	Mayidul Islam Bora	IND	48,755	75.06	Abdul Latif Dewan	IND	5,181	7.98	43,574	67.08
57	Rangiya	Thaneswar Boro	IND	31,447	48.35	Purna Boro	CPI(M)	21,550	33.14	9,897	15.21
58	Tamulpur	Bhaben Narji	IND	20,401	30.95	Maneswar Boro	PTC	13,289	20.16	7,112	10.79
59	Nalbari	Nagen Sarma	IND	54,337	75.55	Triken Das	INC	6,536	9.09	47,801	66.46
60	Barkhetry	Pulakesh Barua	IND	43,590	60.52	Sonabar Ali	IND	19,213	26.67	24,377	33.85
61	Dharmapur	Chandra Mohan Patowari	IND	46,843	76.05	Bhumidhar Barman	INC	11,556	18.76	35,287	57.29
62	Barama (ST)	Rekha Rani Das Boro	IND	36,434	54.54	Alit Chandra Boro	PTC	21,405	32.04	15,029	22.50
63	Chapaguri (ST)	Suren Swargiary	IND	31,163	47.83	Chilarai Uzir	PTC	24,565	37.71	6,598	10.12
64	Panery	Durga Das Boro	IND	13,236	27.01	Ranjit Kumar Boro	PTC	10,519	21.47	2,717	5.54
65	Kalaigaon	Mohendra Mohan Rai Choudhury	IND	22,187	39.67	Siddique Ali	IND	15,294	27.35	6,893	12.32
66	Sipajhar	Zoli Nath Sarma	IND	48,091	73.67	Madhab Rajbongshi	JP	9,675	14.82	38,416	58.85
67	Mangaldoi (SC)	Nilamoni Das	IND	36,654	49.95	Matila Mandal	IND	31,566	43.02	5,088	6.93
68	Dalgaon	Abdul Jabbar	IND	36,001	59.60	Subodh Ghose	IND	12,936	21.42	23,065	38.18
69	Udalguri (ST)	Binal Khungur Basumatari	IND	18,899	33.32	Proloy Kumar Basumatari	PTC	13,763	24.27	5,136	9.05
70	Majbat	Silviub Condpan	INC	20,503	43.13	Jigacharan Brahma	PTC	10,112	21.27	10,391	21.86
71	Dhekiajuli	Hiranya Bora	INC	16,533	31.77	Joseph Toppo	IND	13,027	25.03	3,506	6.74
72	Barchalla	Prafulla Goswami	IND	23,927	43.85	Kshemraj Adhikari	INC	11,343	20.79	12,584	23.06
73	Tezpur	Brindabon Goswami	IND	33,645	59.01	Naren Sarma	INC	13,525	23.72	20,120	35.29
74	Rangapara	Golok Rajbanshi	INC	17,084	34.36	Dhaniram Khosla	CPI(M)	9,677	19.46	7,407	14.90
75	Sootea	Robin Saikia	IND	24,228	39.17	Dulal Chandra Bhuyan	INC	20,895	33.78	3,333	5.39
76	Biswanath	Padmanath Koiri	IND	24,570	45.95	Kosheswar Barah	IND	15,861	29.66	8,709	16.29
77	Behali	Swarup Upadhyaya	INC	16,511	40.37	Amarnath Upadhyaya	IND	6,354	15.53	10,157	24.84
78	Gohpur	Ganesh Kutum	IND	28,383	39.58	Kosheswar Baruah	INC	16,761	23.37	11,622	16.21
79	Jagiroad (SC)	Moti Das	IND	37,679	56.64	Mohan Bongshi Sarkar	IC(S)	22,514	33.84	15,165	22.80
80	Marigaon	Harendra Bora	IND	30,649	46.50	Kaliram Dekaraja	IND	6,950	10.54	23,699	35.96
81	Laharighat	Abdul Jalil	IC(S)	15,205	24.58	Atul Chandra Bora	IND	12,998	21.01	2,207	3.57
82	Raha (SC)	Umesh Chandra Das	IND	39,109	57.36	Nani Gopal Sarkar	IND	20,924	30.69	18,185	26.67
83	Dhing	Shahidul Islam	IND	35,483	58.81	Mojibur Rahman	INC	9,010	14.93	26,473	43.88
84	Batadroba	Digen Chandra Borah	IND	33,312	51.24	Mehmud Ali	IND	23,033	35.43	10,279	15.81
85	Rupohihat	Rashidul Haque	IND	28,902	44.95	Mohammad Idris	INC	22,692	35.30	6,210	9.65
86	Nowgong	Prafulla Kumar Mahanta	IND	36,369	54.89	Mukut Sarmah	INC	21,999	33.20	14,370	21.69
87	Barhampur	Girindra Kumar Baruah	IND	41,167	61.39	Md. Nurul Iman	IND	9,289	13.85	31,878	47.54
88	Samaguri	Abul Hussain Sarkar	IND	22,631	43.65	Atul Kumar Sharma	IND	12,691	24.48	9,940	19.17
89	Kaliabor	Prafulla Kumar Mahanta	IND	21,173	46.59	Boloram Nag	INC	17,803	39.18	3,370	7.41
90	Jamunamukh	Abdul Jalil Ragibi	IND	41,625	65.71	Sukumar Sarkar	IND	7,033	11.10	34,592	54.61
91	Hojai	Santi Ranjan Das Gupta	IND	25,348	37.81	Sadhan Ranjan Sarkar	INC	19,588	29.22	5,760	8.59
92	Lumding	Ardhendu Kumar Dey	IND	21,131	33.61	Sunil Dhar	CPI(M)	16,765	26.67	4,366	6.94
93	Bokakhat	Balobhadra Tamuly	IND	20,985	42.80	Bhupen Bhuyan	INC	16,419	33.49	4,566	9.31
94	Sarupathar	Binod Guwala	IND	36,123	47.34	Aklius Tirki	INC	27,553	36.11	8,570	11.23
95	Golaghat	Debeswar Bora	IND	30,101	46.61	Nagen Neog	INC	21,287	32.96	8,814	13.65
96	Khumtai	Prabin Kumar Gogoi	IND	32,167	61.76	Jiba Kanta Gogoi	INC	16,427	31.54	15,740	30.22
97	Dergaon (SC)	Bhabendra Nath	IND	38,344	68.20	Hemprakash Narayan	INC	15,890	28.26	22,454	39.94
98	Jorhat	Abhijit Sarmah	IND	43,382	68.62	Dina Nath Rajkhowa	INC	15,691	24.82	27,691	43.80
99	Majuli (ST)	Padmeswar Deley	IND	35,065	65.62	Padmadhar Pegu	INC	14,276	26.72	20,789	38.90
100	Titabar	Deba Kumar Bora	IND	25,541	51.19	Rupan Kurmi	INC	15,579	31.23	9,962	19.96
101	Mariani	Naren Tanti	IND	19,809	47.01	Siba Buragohain	INC	9,806	23.27	10,003	23.74
102	Teok	Lalit Chandra Rajkhowa	IND	37,235	75.51	Dibya Lata Gogoi	INC	11,025	22.36	26,210	53.15
103	Amguri	Prodip Hazarika	IND	32,509	70.82	Kirti Dutta	INC	9,549	20.80	22,960	50.02
104	Nazira	Hiteswar Saikia	INC	25,360	55.89	Tanu Konwar	IND	17,089	37.66	8,271	18.23
105	Mahmara	Chandra Arandhara	IND	25,284	52.72	Narad Kumar	INC	12,778	26.64	12,506	26.08
106	Sonari	Bhadreswar Bura Gohain	IND	22,424	39.31	Satya Tanti	INC	22,159	38.85	265	0.46
107	Thowra	Barki Prasad Telenga	IND	22,248	52.70	Tankeswar Dihingia	INC	15,740	37.29	6,508	15.41
108	Sibsagar	Prodip Gogoi	IND	33,135	58.88	Troilukyada Gogoi	INC	14,804	26.31	18,331	32.57
109	Bihpuria	Kesharam Bora	IND	32,799	58.95	Borgaram Deuri	IND	8,108	14.57	24,691	44.38
110	Naoboicha	Jagot Hazarika	IND	22,334	38.10	Afazuddin Ahmed	INC	18,256	31.14	4,078	6.96
111	Lakhimpur	Utpal Dutta	IND	29,471	58.42	Lekhan Lahan	INC	11,795	23.38	17,676	35.04
112	Dhakuakhana (ST)	Bharat Chandra Narah	IND	30,113	49.56	Raghunath Pemagam	INC	12,515	20.60	17,598	28.96
113	Dhemaji (ST)	Dilip Kumar Saikia	IND	38,862	54.97	Purna Kanta Pegu	INC	9,579	13.55	29,283	41.42
114	Jonai (ST)	Phani Ram Tayeng	IND	23,930	37.57	Mandeswar Kumbang	INC	13,083	20.54	10,847	17.03
115	Moran	Kiron Kumar Gogoi	IND	21,561	46.86	Haren Gogoi	INC	10,188	22.14	11,373	24.72
116	Dibrugarh	Keshab Gogoi	INC	24,100	44.87	Ananta Handique	IND	20,045	37.32	4,055	7.55
117	Lahowal	Dipen Tanti	IND	22,837	51.03	Dipok Moormoo	INC	18,566	41.48	4,271	9.55
118	Duliajan	Amiya Gogoi	INC	19,506	41.17	Nakul Baruah	IND	18,830	39.75	676	1.42
119	Tingkhong	Atul Chandra Koch	IND	21,907	44.99	Paban Ghatuwar	INC	16,752	34.40	5,155	10.59
120	Naharkatia	Kusumbar Tairai (Gogoi)	IND	23,243	42.80	Khirud Saikia	INC	17,412	32.06	5,831	10.74
121	Chabua	Bhuban Barua	IND	22,979	45.48	Upendra Nath Sonaton	INC	22,317	44.17	662	1.31
122	Tinsukia	Shio Shambhu Ojha	INC	20,999	42.83	Binod Goswami	IND	12,815	26.14	8,184	16.69
123	Digboi	Rameswar Dhanowar	INC	27,438	58.54	Dayanand Dowera	IND	12,330	26.31	15,108	32.23
124	Margherita	Kul Bahadur Chetry	INC	22,455	41.32	Debajit Baruah	IND	17,141	31.54	5,314	9.78
125	Doom Dooma	Dileswar Tanti	INC	22,755	51.24	Bijoy Kumar Tirky	IND	10,958	24.67	11,797	26.57
126	Sadiya	Jyotsna Sonowal	IND	21,508	43.92	Rajendra Nath Phukan	INC	12,790	26.12	8,718	17.80

== By-elections ==
A.C. No.	Constituency Name	Type A.C.	Winner Candidate	Party	Reason
1.	Kaliabor	Gen	Gunin Hazarika	Independent politician	Resignation of Prafulla Kumar Mahanta
2.	Nazira	Gen	Tanu Konwer	Asom Gana Parishad	Resignation of Hiteswar Saikia
