= Samar Brahma Choudhury =

Bodo politician (died 1991)

Member of Parliament, Lok Sabha
- In office 1985–1989
- Preceded by: Charan Narzary
- Succeeded by: S. N. Brohmo Chaudhury
- Constituency: Kokrajhar

Minister for Forest and Public Health Engineering
- In office 8 March 1982 – 19 March 1982
- Chief Minister: Keshab Chandra Gogoi

Member of Assam Legislative Assembly
- In office 1978–1983
- Preceded by: Sarat Chandra Sinha
- Succeeded by: Dambarudhar Brahma
- Constituency: Kokrajhar East

Personal details
- Born: c.1932
- Died: 26 August 1991 (aged 58–59) Kokrajhar, Assam, India
- Party: Plain Tribals Council of Assam
- Spouse: Sandhya Rani Brahma Choudhury
- Children: 4

Samar Brahma Choudhury (c. 1932 – 26 August 1991) was a Bodo politician who was an Member of Assam Legislative Assembly (MLA) and Member of the Lok Sabha.

== Political career ==
He was elected MLA for Kokrajhar East in 1978. He served as Minister for Forest and Public Health Engineering in 1982 under Keshab Chandra Gogoi. He was a member of the Lok Sabha from 1985 until 1989.

== Family ==
Choudhury married Sandhya Rani Brahma Choudhury, and they had three sons and one daughter together.

== Assassination ==
Choudhury was assassinated on 26 August 1991. He was shot by suspected ABSU activists in Kokrajhar.
