= Mohammad Idris (Indian politician) =

Indian politician (died 1989)

Cabinet Minister, Government of Assam
- In office 28 February 1983 – 23 December 1985
- Chief Minister: Hiteswar Saikia

Cabinet Minister, Government of Assam
- In office 13 January 1982 – 19 March 1982
- Chief Minister: Keshab Chandra Gogoi

Cabinet Minister, Government of Assam
- In office 6 December 1980 – 30 June 1981
- Chief Minister: Anwara Taimur

Cabinet Minister, Government of Assam
- In office 31 January 1972 – 12 March 1978
- Chief Minister: Sarat Chandra Sinha

Member of Assam Legislative Assembly
- In office 1972 – 1985
- Preceded by: M. A Mossabir
- Succeeded by: Rashidul Haque
- Constituency: Rupohihat
- In office 1957 – 1962
- Preceded by: Constituency established
- Succeeded by: Abu Nasar Mohammad Ohid
- Constituency: Rupohihat

Personal details
- Born: c.1923 Nagaon, Assam Province, British India
- Died: 8 February 1989 (aged 65–66)
- Party: Indian National Congress
- Parent: Haji Amir Uddin (Father)
- Education: Cotton College

Mohammad Idris (c. 1923 – 8 February 1989) was an Indian politician and lawyer from Assam who served as a cabinet minister between 1972 and 1985. He was the Member of Assam Legislative Assembly (MLA) for Rupohihat from 1957 to 1962 and again from 1972 to 1982.

== Early life and education ==
Mohammad Idris was born c. 1923 in Nagaon, the son of Haji Amir Uddin. He studied at Cotton College. He worked as a teacher and practised law.

== Political career ==
Idris was elected in MLA for Rupohihat in 1957. He was elected in 1972, 1978, and 1983. He served as a cabinet minister under Sarat Chandra Sinha, Anwara Taimur, Keshab Chandra Gogoi, and Hiteswar Saikia. He served as finance minister under Sinha, Gogoi, and Saikia.

== Death ==
Idris died on 8 February 1989.
