= Aklius Tirkey =

Indian politician (born 1941)

Minister of State for Welfare of Scheduled Castes and Scheduled Tribes, and Labour
- In office 8 March 1982 – 19 March 1982
- Chief Minister: Keshab Chandra Gogoi

Member of Assam Legislative Assembly
- In office 2011–2016
- Preceded by: Binod Gowal
- Succeeded by: Roselina Tirkey
- Constituency: Sarupathar
- In office 2001–2006
- Preceded by: Binod Gowal
- Succeeded by: Binod Gowal
- Constituency: Sarupathar
- In office 1978–1983
- Preceded by: Chatra Gopal Karmakar
- Succeeded by: Abdul Matlib

Personal details
- Born: 1941 (age 84–85)
- Party: Indian National Congress
- Spouse: Mary Grace Tirkey
- Children: Roselina Tirkey
- Occupation: Politician

Aklius Tirkey (born 1941) is an Indian politician and teacher from Assam who was the Member of Assam Legislative Assembly (MLA) for Sarupathar from 1978 to 1983, 2001 to 2006 and 2011 to 2016. He served as a Minister of State in 1982 under Keshab Chandra Gogoi.

== Early life and career ==
Tirkey was born in 1941. He was a teacher from 1961 to 1964.

== Political career ==
He was elected MLA for Sarupathar in 1978, 2001, and 2011. He served as Minister of State for Welfare of Scheduled Castes and Scheduled Tribes, and Labour in 1982, under Keshab Chandra Gogoi.

== Family ==
Tirkey married Mary Grace Tirkey and they had one daughter together. Their daughter, Roselina, became an MLA in 2016.
