= Biswajit Daimary =

Speaker of the Assam Legislative Assembly

Cabinet Minister, Assam
- Incumbent
- Assumed office 5 June 2026
- Chief Minister: Himanta Biswa Sarma

Speaker of Assam Legislative Assembly
- In office 21 May 2021 – 20 May 2026
- Deputy: Numal Momin
- Preceded by: Hitendra Nath Goswami
- Succeeded by: Ranjeet Kumar Dass

Member, Assam Legislative Assembly
- Incumbent
- Assumed office 2 May 2021
- Preceded by: Kamali Basumatari
- Constituency: Panery

Member of Parliament, Rajya Sabha
- In office 23 February 2021 – 2 May 2021
- Preceded by: Himself
- Succeeded by: Sarbananda Sonowal
- Constituency: Assam
- In office 10 April 2008 – 21 November 2020
- Succeeded by: Himself
- Constituency: Assam

Personal details
- Born: 4 February 1971 (age 55) Suagpur, Baksa district, Bodoland Territorial Region, Assam
- Party: Bharatiya Janata Party (2021–present)
- Other political affiliations: Bodoland People's Front (2006–2021)
- Spouse: Mina Brahma Daimary (m. 1999)
- Children: Two sons and two daughters
- Education: M. A., Hindi Visharad; Kokrajhar College; Madurai Kamaraj University
- Profession: Social Worker and Agriculturist
- As of 15 October, 2015

Biswajit Daimary (born 4 February 1971) is an Indian politician from Bharatiya Janata Party who has served as the 17th Speaker of Assam Legislative Assembly from 2021 to 2026. He has represented the Panery constituency in Assam Legislative Assembly since 2021. He was also member of Rajya Sabha as a member of the Bharatiya Janata Party from 2021 to 2021 and as a member of the Bodoland People's Front from 2008 to 2020. He was first elected as Member of Assam Legislative Assembly from 2001 to 2006. He was elected for second term from 2014 to 2020 as a member of Bodoland People's Front and from 2021 as a member of Bharatiya Janata Party. In November 2020, Daimary left BPF to join Bharatiya Janata Party before Bodoland Territorial Council elections.

== Personal life ==
Daimary was born to Surendra Daimary and Fedab Daimary in Suagpur, Baksa district in Assam. He completed Higher Secondary education from Kokrajhar College. He married Mina Brahma Daimary on 4 December 1999.

== Positions held ==
Political positions held by Daimary:

- 2001–2006 – Member of Assam Legislative Assembly
- 2006–2008 – Chairman, Assam Apex Weavers and Artisans Co-operative Federation Limited, Government of Assam
- Apr. 2008 to Nov. 2021 – Elected to Rajya Sabha
- Sep. 2010 – Member, Committee on Subordinate Legislation
- May 2008 to May 2009 – Member, Committee on Transport, Tourism, and Culture
- May 2008 to May 2009 – Member, Consultative Committee for the Ministry of Railways
- Aug. 2009 to present – Member, Consultative Committee for the Ministry of Railways
- Aug. 2009 to present – Member, Committee on Chemicals and Fertilizers.
- 2021–2026 – Speaker of Assam Legislative Assembly
- 2021–present – Member of Assam Legislative Assembly
- 2026–Present – Minister of Handloom, Textiles & Sericulture; Sports & Youth Welfare; Skill, Employment & Entrepreneurship; and Indigenous & Tribal Faith & Culture, Assam

== Election History ==
=== Rajya Sabha ===
Position	Party	Constituency	From	To	Tenure
Member of Parliament, Rajya Sabha (1st Term)	BPF	Assam	10 April 2008	9 April 2014	5 years, 364 days
Member of Parliament, Rajya Sabha (2nd Term)	BPF	Assam	10 April 2014	9 April 2020	5 years, 365 days
Member of Parliament, Rajya Sabha (3rd Term)	BPF	Assam	10 April 2020	21 November 2020	225 days
Member of Parliament, Rajya Sabha (4th Term)	BJP	Assam	23 February 2021	10 May 2021	76 days
