= Suren Swargiary =

Indian politician

Suren Swargiary is an Asom Gana Parishad politician from Assam. He was elected to the Assam Legislative Assembly in the 1985 and 1991 elections from Chapaguri constituency.
