= A. N. Akram Hussain =

Indian politician

Minister of State for Rural Development and Social Welfare
- In office 23 January 1982 – 19 March 1982
- Chief Minister: Keshab Chandra Gogoi

Member of Assam Legislative Assembly
- In office 1978–1983
- Preceded by: Satyavati Goswami
- Succeeded by: Harendra Nath Talukdar
- Constituency: Chaygaon
- In office 1968 – 1972
- Preceded by: Hareswar Goswami
- Succeeded by: Satyavati Goswami
- Constituency: Chaygaon

Personal details
- Born: 1929 Guwahati, Assam province, British India
- Died: Unknown?
- Party: Indian National Congress
- Spouse: Aktara Begum (m. 1948)
- Children: 4
- Occupation: Politician

A. N. Akram Hussain (born 1929; died unknown) was an Indian politician from the state of Assam who served as a Minister of State in the Keshab Chandra Gogoi ministry in 1982, and was Member of Assam Legislative Assembly (MLA) for Chaygaon.

== Early and personal life ==
Hussain was born in 1929 in Guwahati. He married Aktara Begum in 1948, and they had three sons and one daughters.

== Political career ==
Hussain was appointed Minister of State for Rural Development and Social Welfare under Keshab Chandra Gogoi in 1982. He won a by-election to become MLA for Chaygaon in 1968, and lost the 1972 election before being reelected in 1978.
