= Sewli Mohilary =

Indian politician (born 1977)

Assam Legislative Assembly
- Incumbent
- Assumed office 4 May 2026
- Constituency: Kokrajhar Assembly constituency

Personal details
- Party: Bodoland People's Front
- Relations: Hagrama Mohilary (Husband)
- Profession: Politician

Sewli Mohilary (born 1977) is an Indian politician from Assam. She is a Member of the Legislative Assembly from Kokrajhar Assembly constituency which is reserved for Scheduled Tribe community in Kokrajhar district representing the Bodoland Peoples Front.

== Early life and education ==
Mohilary is from Kokrajhar, Assam. Her husband Sri Hagrama Mohilary is also a politician. She completed her Master of Arts in economics at University of Pune, Maharashtra in 2000. She runs her own business. She declared assets worth Rs. 63 crore in her affidavit filed with the Election Commission of India.

== Career ==
Mohilary became an MLA winning the 2026 Assam Legislative Assembly election from Kokrajhar Assembly constituency representing the Bodoland Peoples Front. She polled 74,816 votes and defeated her nearest rival, Lawrence Islary of the United People's Party (Liberal), by a margin of 39,633 votes.
