= Roselina Tirkey =

Indian politician

Working President of Assam PradeshCongress Committee
- Incumbent
- Assumed office 26 May 2025

Member of Assam Legislative Assembly
- In office 19 May 2016 – 21 May 2021
- Preceded by: Aklius Tirkey
- Succeeded by: Biswajit Phukan
- Constituency: Sarupathar

Personal details
- Born: 1 May 1982 (age 44)
- Party: Indian National Congress
- Parents: Aklius Tirkey (Father); Mary Grace Tirkey (Mother)

Roselina Tirkey (born 1 May 1982) is an Indian politician from the state of Assam. She was elected to the Assam Legislative Assembly from Sarupathar as a member of the Indian National Congress. She contested the 2024 Indian General Election in Assam for the prestigious Kaziranga Lok Sabha Constituency for Indian National Congress.

== Early life and education ==
Tirkey was born in Golaghat town, Assam. Her parents are Aklius Tirkey and late Mary Grace Tirkey. Her father Aklius was a former MLA. Tirkey did her B.C.A. from Makhanlal Chaturvedi National University of Journalism and Mass Communication, Bhopal. Later, she completed her M.B.A. from Indian Institute of Planning and Management in 2006.

Earlier, she served as Golaghat Zilla Parishad from 2007 to 2012. Thereafter, she was a member of Morangi Zilla Parishad constituency from 2012 to 2016. She also worked as the Assistant Secretary, Assam Chah Mazdoor Sangha (ACMS), at their Golaghat branch.

== Career ==
Tirkey won the 2016 Assam Legislative Assembly Election from Sarupathar Assembly Constituency on Indian National Congress ticket defeating Binod Gowalla of Asom Gana Parishad by a margin of 2927 votes. But she lost the 2021 election to Biswajit Phukan of BJP.
