= Joy Chandra Nagbanshi =

Indian politician

Minister for Cooperation and Excise
- In office 8 March 1982 – 19 March 1982
- Chief Minister: Keshab Chandra Gogoi

Member of Assam Legislative Assembly
- In office 1991–2001
- Preceded by: Kiron Kumar Gogoi
- Succeeded by: Sarbananda Sonowal
- Constituency: Moran
- In office 1987–1985
- Preceded by: Tarun Chandra Chutia
- Succeeded by: Kiron Kumar Gogoi
- Constituency: Moran

Personal details
- Born: 28 September 1950
- Died: 30 September 2016 (aged 66) Dibrugarh, Assam, India
- Party: Indian National Congress
- Spouse: Monimala Nagbanshi
- Children: 1

Joy Chandra Nagbanshi (28 September 1950 – 30 September 2016) was an Indian politician from Assam who was a Member of Assam Legislative Assembly (MLA) and cabinet minister.

== Political career ==
Nagbanshi was elected MLA of Moran in 1978, 1983, 1991, and 1996. He served as Minister for Cooperation and Excise under Keshab Chandra Gogoi.

== Personal life and death ==
Nagbanshi was married to Monimala Nagbanshi and they had one child together.

Nagbanshi died of a stroke on 30 September 2016 in Dibrugarh.
