= Nihar Ranjan Das =

Indian politician

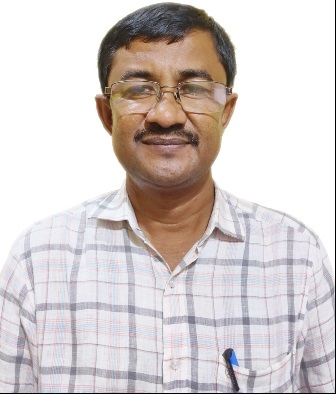
- Nihar Ranjan Das in 2024

Member of Assam Legislative Assembly
- In office 13 November 2024 – 4 May 2026
- Preceded by: Parimal Suklabaidya
- Succeeded by: Amiya Kanti Das
- Constituency: Dholai

Personal details
- Party: Bharatiya Janata Party (until 2026)
- Profession: Lawyer

Nihar Ranjan Das is an Indian politician from Assam. He has been a member of the Assam Legislative Assembly since 2024, representing Dholai Assembly constituency as a member of the Bharatiya Janata Party.

== See also ==
- Dholai Assembly constituency
- Assam Legislative Assembly
