= Kaliram Dekaraja =

Indian politician (born 1941)

Minister of State for Revenue and Tribal Areas
- In office 8 March 1982 – 19 March 1982
- Chief Minister: Keshab Chandra Gogoi

Member of Assam Legislative Assembly
- In office 1978–1983
- Preceded by: Pitsing Konwar
- Succeeded by: Mohammad Hussain
- Constituency: Morigaon

Personal details
- Born: 1 January 1941 (age 85)
- Party: Indian National Congress
- Spouse: Mala Dekaraja
- Children: 2

Kaliram Dekaraja (born 1 January 1941) is an Indian politician from Assam who was the Member of Assam Legislative Assembly (MLA) for Morigaon from 1978 to 1983. He served as Minister of State for Revenue and Tribal Areas in 1982 under Keshab Chandra Gogoi.

== Early life ==
Dekaraja was born in 1941.

== Political career ==
He was elected MLA for Morigaon in 1978. He served as Minister of State for Revenue and Tribal Areas in 1982, under Keshab Chandra Gogoi.

== Family ==
Dekaraja is married to Mala Dekaraja, and they had two daughters together.
