= Dholai Assembly constituency =

Constituency of the Assam legislative assembly in India

Dholai
- Constituency No. 120 for the Assam Legislative Assembly
- 120-Dholai within Cachar district

Constituency details
- Country: India
- Region: Northeast India
- State: Assam
- Division: Barak Valley
- District: Cachar
- Lok Sabha constituency: Silchar
- Established: 1967
- Total electors: 197,122
- Reservation: SC

Member of Legislative Assembly
- 16th Assam Legislative Assembly
- Incumbent Amiya Kanti Das
- Party: BJP
- Alliance: NDA
- Elected year: 2026
- Preceded by: Nihar Ranjan Das (BJP)

Dholai State assembly constituency is one of the 126 state legislative assembly constituencies in Assam, India. It is one of the seven assembly segments that constitute the Silchar Lok Sabha constituency. Since 2026, it has been represented by Amiya Kanti Das of the Bharatiya Janata Party.

Established in 1967, the constituency was redrawn during the 2023 delimitation exercise. It is now an all-rural constituency comprising several rural areas of Cachar district.

Most Successful parties from Dholai Assembly Constituency Since 1967
1. BJP (7 times) (46.7%)
2. INC (6 times) (40.0%)
3. IND (2 times) (13.3%)

== Local self-governed segments ==
Dholai Assembly constituency is composed of the following local self-governed segments:

- Barjalenga Development Block
- Binnakandi Development Block
  - Boali Chenjur Gram Panchayat
- Narsingpur Development Block
- Palonghat Development Block
  - Gonganagar Gram Panchayat
  - Darmikhal Gram Panchayat
  - Rukni Gram Panchayat
  - Palonghat Gram Panchayat
  - Bhubandahar Gram Panchayat
  - Mohankhal Rammanikpur Gram Panchayat
  - Moniarkhal Gram Panchayat
  - Bhuban Hill Gram Panchayat
- Sonai Development Block
  - Sundari Gram Panchayat

== Members of the Legislative Assembly ==
Following is the list of members representing Dholai Assembly constituency in Assam Legislature:

Election	Member	Political Party	Tenure
2026	Amiya Kanti Das	Bharatiya Janata Party	Incumbent
2024^	Nihar Ranjan Das	Bharatiya Janata Party	2024-26
2021	Parimal Suklabaidya	Bharatiya Janata Party	2016-24
2016	Parimal Suklabaidya	Bharatiya Janata Party	2016-24
2011	Girindra Mallik	Indian National Congress	2011-16
2006	Parimal Suklabaidya	Bharatiya Janata Party	2001-11
2001	Parimal Suklabaidya	Bharatiya Janata Party	2001-11
1996	Girindra Mallik	Indian National Congress	1996-01
1991	Parimal Suklabaidya	Bharatiya Janata Party	1991-96
1985	Digendra Purkayastha	Indian National Congress	1985-91
1983	Sisir Ranjan Das	Indian National Congress	1978-85
1978	Sisir Ranjan Das	Indian National Congress	1978-85
1972	D.C Purkayastha	Indian National Congress	1972-78
1970^	S.P Baindya	Independent	1970-72
1967	J.M Barbhuiya	Independent	1967-70

- ^ bye-election

== Election results ==
=== 2026 ===
2026 Assam Legislative Assembly election: Dholai
Party	Candidate	Votes	%	±%
BJP	Amiya Kanti Das	100,634	62.73	▲13.24
INC	Dhrubajyoti Purkayastha	56,172	35.02	▼8.03
NOTA	None of the above	1,972	1.23	▲0.15
Margin of victory		44,462	27.72	▲21.28
Turnout		160,413	81.38	▲11.14
Registered electors		197,122		▼2.04
BJP hold		Swing	▲10.63	

=== 2024 by-election ===
Assam Legislative Assembly by-election 2024: Dholai
Party	Candidate	Votes	%	±%
BJP	Nihar Ranjan Das	69,945	49.49	
INC	Dhrubajyoti Purakayastha	60,847	43.05	
Independent	Amalendu Das	5,061	3.58	
SUCI(C)	Gour Chandra Das	1,737	1.23	
NOTA	None of the Above	1,528	1.08	
Majority		9,098	6.44	
Turnout		141,339	70.24	
Registered electors		201,220		
BJP hold		Swing		

=== 2021 ===
2021 Assam Legislative Assembly election: Dholai
Party	Candidate	Votes	%	±%
BJP	Parimal Suklabaidya	82,568	55.03	▲1.49
INC	Kamakhya Prasad Mala	62,176	41.44	▲8.82
SUCI(C)	Gour Chandra Das	1,834	1.22	▲0.33
NOTA	None of the above	1,561	1.04	▼0.60
Margin of victory		20,392	13.73	▼7.19
Turnout		148,490	78.13	−2.01
BJP hold		Swing	▲1.49	

=== 2016 ===
2016 Assam Legislative Assembly election: Dholai
Party	Candidate	Votes	%	±%
BJP	Parimal Suklabaidya	68,694	53.54	
INC	Girindra Mallik	41,857	32.62	
AIUDF	Lalta Prosad Mala	13,382	10.42	
SUCI(C)	Gour Chandra Das	1,146	0.89	
Independent	Nihar Ranjan Das	1,114	0.86	
NOTA	None of the above	2,110	1.64	
Majority		26,837	20.92	
Turnout		1,28,303	80.14	
Registered electors		1,60,092		
BJP gain from INC		Swing		

== See also ==
- Silchar Assembly constituency
- Hailakandi Assembly constituency
- Lumding Assembly constituency
- Hojai Assembly constituency
- Katigorah Assembly constituency
- Ram Krishna Nagar Assembly constituency
- Bijni Assembly constituency
- Patharkandi Assembly constituency
- Borkhola Assembly constituency
