= Sisir Ranjan Das =

Indian politician

Member of the Assam Legislative Assembly
- In office 1978–1985
- Preceded by: Digendra Purkayastha
- Succeeded by: D.C Purkayastha
- Constituency: Dholai

Personal details
- Party: Indian National Congress

Sisir Ranjan Das is an Indian politician who was elected to the Assam Legislative Assembly from Dholai constituency in the 1978 and 1983 elections as a member of the Indian National Congress.
