= Chapaguri Assembly constituency =

Constituency of the Assam legislative assembly in India

Coordinates: 26.78°N 92.79°E

Chapaguri
- Former constituency No. 63 for the Assam Legislative Assembly

Constituency details
- Country: India
- Region: Northeast India
- State: Assam
- District: Baksa
- Lok Sabha constituency: Kokrajhar
- Established: 1978
- Abolished: 2023
- Reservation: ST

Chapaguri Assembly constituency was one of the 126 assembly constituencies of Assam Legislative Assembly. Chapaguri forms part of the Kokrajhar Lok Sabha constituency. It is a reserved seat for the Scheduled tribes (ST).

This constituency was abolished in 2023.

== Town Details ==
Following are details on Chapaguri Assembly constituency-

- Country: India.
- State: Assam.
- District: Baksa district .
- Lok Sabha Constituency: Kokrajhar Lok Sabha/Parliamentary constituency.
- Assembly Categorisation: Rural constituency.
- Literacy Level:70.53%.
- Eligible Electors as per 2021 General Elections: 1,59,257 Eligible Electors. Male Electors:79,384 . Female Electors: 79,873.
- Geographic Co-Ordinates: 26°43'33.6"N 91°12'10.4"E..
- Total Area Covered:262 square kilometres.
- Area Includes: Chapaguri and Kaklabari mouzas and Reserved forest in Patacharkuchi thana in Barpeta subdivision; and Uttar Baska and Dakhin Baska mouzas in Barama thana in Nalbari sub-division, of Baksa district of Assam.
- Inter State Border :Baksa.
- Number Of Polling Stations: Year 2011-184, Year 2016-185, Year 2021-63.

== Members of Legislative Assembly ==
Election	Member	Party affiliation
1978	Manik Chandra Das	Independent
1983	Bimal Gayari	Plain Tribals Council of Assam
1985	Suren Swargiary	Independent
1991	Suren Swargiary	Asom Gana Parishad
1996	Jagmohan Basumatary	People's Democratic Front
2001	Tijen Basumatary	Independent
2006	Thaneswar Basumatary	Independent
2011	Hitesh Basumatary	Bodoland People's Front
2016	Thaneswar Basumatary	Bodoland People's Front
2021	Urkhao Gwra Brahma	United People's Party Liberal

== Election results ==
=== 2021 ===
Assam Legislative Assembly Election, 2021: Chapaguri
Party	Candidate	Votes	%	±%
UPPL	Urkhao Gwra Brahma	61,804	48.58	
BPF	Hitesh Basumatary	35,065	27.56	−10.23
Independent	Sujan Das	20,989	16.50	
NOTA	None of the above	1,884	1.48	−0.31
Majority		26,739	16.58	
Turnout		1,27,223	78.92	
Registered electors		1,61,197		
UPPL gain from BPF		Swing		

=== 2016 ===
2016 Assam Legislative Assembly election: Chapaguri
Party	Candidate	Votes	%	±%
BPF	Thaneswar Basumatary	43,250	37.79	
Independent	Sujan Das	41,769	36.50	
Independent	Hitesh Basumatary	27,342	23.89	
NOTA	None of the above	2,058	1.79	
Majority		1,481	1.29	
Turnout		1,14,419	83.35	
Registered electors		1,37,267		
BPF hold		Swing		
