= Ramesh Chandra Saharia =

Indian politician (1930–1982)

Cabinet Minister, Government of Assam
- In office 13 January 1982 – 8 February 1982
- Chief Minister: Keshab Chandra Gogoi

Cabinet Minister, Government of Assam
- In office 6 December 1980 – 30 June 1981
- Chief Minister: Anwara Taimur

Cabinet Minister, Government of Assam
- In office 9 September 1979 – 11 December 1979
- Chief Minister: Jogendra Nath Hazarika

Member of Assam Legislative Assembly
- In office 1972 – 8 February 1982
- Preceded by: Hiralal Patwari
- Succeeded by: Mridula Saharia
- Constituency: Panery

Personal details
- Born: 1 December 1930
- Died: 8 February 1982 (aged 51) Guwahati, Assam, India
- Party: Independent (1978–1982) Janata Party (1977–1978) Indian National Congress (until 1977)
- Spouse: Mridula Saharia
- Children: 2
- Parent: Lambodar Saharia (father)
- Education: Cotton College; Banaras Hindu University

Ramesh Chandra Saharia (1 December 1930 – 8 February 1982) was an Indian politician and educationist from Assam who served as a cabinet minister between 1979 and 1982. He was the Member of Assam Legislative Assembly (MLA) for Panery from 1972 until his death in 1982.

== Early life and career ==
Ramesh Chandra Saharia was born on 1 December 1930, the son of Lambodar Saharia. He studied at Cotton College and Banaras Hindu University, and was headmaster of Tangla High School for fourteen years.

== Political career ==
Saharia was elected in MLA for Panery in 1972 for the Indian National Congress. He defected to the Janata Party in 1977, but left to be an independent at the 1978 election in which he was reelected. He served as a cabinet minister under Jogendra Nath Hazarika, Anwara Taimur and Keshab Chandra Gogoi.

== Personal life ==
Saharia married Mridula Saharia and they had one son and one daughter together. Mridula went on to serve as the MLA of Panery, being elected in 1983.

== Death ==
Saharia died at the age of 51 on 8 February 1982 at Gauhati Medical College and Hospital.
