= Rekibuddin Ahmed =

Indian politician

Member of Assam Legislative Assembly
- Incumbent
- Assumed office 2011
- Preceded by: Dr.Kamala Kanta Kalita
- Constituency: Chaygaon

Personal details
- Born: Rekibuddin Ahmed Hatigaon Sijubar Idgah Road -Guwahati 38, Assam, India
- Party: Indian National Congress
- Spouse: Noori Khan
- Parent: Late Mirjan Ali
- Profession: Politician

Rekibuddin Ahmed is an Indian politician of Indian National Congress from Assam. He was elected to the Assam Legislative Assembly in the 2011, 2016 and 2021 elections from Chaygaon constituency. He served as the President of Assam Pradesh Youth Congress. He served as the President of Assam State NSUI.
