= Pradip Kumar Brahma =

Indian politician

Pradip Kumar Brahma is a Bodoland People's Front politician from Assam, India. He was elected to the Assam Legislative Assembly in the 2016 election, from the Kokrajhar West constituency.
