= Kiron Kumar Gogoi =

Indian politician and teacher (died 2019)

MLA of Moran
- In office 1985–1991
- Preceded by: Joy Chandra Nagbanshi
- Succeeded by: Joy Chandra Nagbanshi

Personal details
- Born: 1954/55
- Died: 8 June 2019
- Party: Asom Gana Parishad

Kiron Kumar Gogoi was an Indian teacher and politician belonging to Asom Gana Parishad. He was elected as a member of Assam Legislative Assembly from Moran in 1985.

Before joining politics, Gogoi served as a Hindi teacher at Lezai Higher Secondary School. He was the President of the Dibrugarh District Assam Sahitya Sabha and till his death he was a Central Committee member of Assam Sahitya Sabha. He also served as the Chairman of Assam Petrochemicals Limited.

Gogoi died on 8 June 2019 at the age of 64.
