= Khowang Assembly constituency =

Constituency of the Assam legislative assembly in India

Coordinates: 27.182°N 94.918°E

Moran
- Constituency No. 115 for the Assam Legislative Assembly

Constituency details
- Country: India
- Region: Northeast India
- State: Assam
- District: Dibrugarh
- Lok Sabha constituency: Dibrugarh
- Established: 1951
- Reservation: None
- Elected year: 2021

Moran Assembly constituency is one of the 126 assembly constituencies of Assam, India. This constituency was renamed to Khowang in 2023.

== Members of Legislative Assembly ==
Election	Member	Party affiliation
1952	Ghana Kanta Gogoi	Independent
1957	Padma Kumari Gohain	Indian National Congress
1962	Padma Kumari Gohain	Indian National Congress
1967	Padma Kumari Gohain	Indian National Congress
1972	Tarun Chandra Chutia	Indian National Congress
1978	Joy Chandra Nagbanshi	Indian National Congress (I)
1983	Joy Chandra Nagbanshi	Indian National Congress
1985	Kiron Kumar Gogoi	Independent
1991	Joy Chandra Nagbanshi	Indian National Congress
1996	Joy Chandra Nagbanshi	Indian National Congress
2001	Sarbananda Sonowal	Asom Gana Parishad
2004^	Jibantara Ghatowar	Indian National Congress
2006	Jibantara Ghatowar	Indian National Congress
2011	Jibantara Ghatowar	Indian National Congress
2016	Chakradhar Gogoi	Bharatiya Janata Party
2021	Chakradhar Gogoi	Bharatiya Janata Party

^ Indicates Bye-Elections

== Election results ==
=== 2026 ===
2026 Assam Legislative Assembly election: Khowang
Party	Candidate	Votes	%	±%
BJP	Chakradhar Gogoi	67,038	50.68	+1.00
AJP	Lurinjyoti Gogoi	57,054	43.13	+34.68
Independent	Biju Duarah	4,316	3.29	N/A
Independent	Prabhakar Das	1,761	1.33	N/A
NOTA	None of the above	2003	1.51	−0.20
Margin of victory		9,984	7.54	−12.42
Turnout		1,32,271	82.55	+4.38
Rejected ballots				
Registered electors				
BJP gain from AJP		Swing		

=== 2021 ===
2021 Assam Legislative Assembly election: Moran
Party	Candidate	Votes	%	±%
BJP	Chakradhar Gogoi	55,604	49.68	−4.45
INC	Pranjal Gatowar	33,263	29.72	−8.31
AJP	Sanjib Changmai	9,499	8.49	N/A
Independent	Mohini Mohan Ligira	8,834	7.89	N/A
Independent	Raphael Kujur	2,293	2.05	N/A
Independent	Eliash Sichan	518	0.46	N/A
NOTA	None of the above	1,910	1.71	+0.06
Margin of victory		22,341	19.96	+3.86
Turnout		1,11,921	78.17	−5.54
Rejected ballots		1,895	1.32	
Registered electors		1,43,170		
BJP gain from INC		Swing		

=== 2016 ===
2016 Assam Legislative Assembly election: Moran
Party	Candidate	Votes	%	±%
BJP	Chakradhar Gogoi	54,571	54.13	+36.46
INC	Paban Singh Ghatowar	38,340	38.03	−19.14
Independent	Ashok Kumar Urang	2,322	2.30	N/A
CPI	Hiranya Boruah	1,650	1.63	N/A
Independent	Sunil Rajkonwar	1,464	1.45	N/A
Independent	Rubul Buragohain	791	0.78	N/A
NOTA	None of the above	1,673	1.65	N/A
Majority		16,231	16.10	−19.68
Turnout		1,00,811	83.71	+11.78
BJP gain from INC		Swing	+8.66	

=== 2011 ===
2011 Assam Legislative Assembly election: Moran
Party	Candidate	Votes	%	±%
INC	Jibantara Ghatowar	47,143	57.17	+11.35
AGP	Sunil Rajkonwar	17,650	21.39	−8.99
BJP	Swarna Saikia Deori	14,571	17.67	−2.03
Independent	Shyamal Bhumij	2,343	2.84	N/A
JMM	Lakhicharan Swausi	752	0.91	N/A
Majority		29,493	35.78	+20.34
Turnout		82,459	71.93	−3.41
INC hold		Swing		

=== 2006 ===
Assam Legislative Assembly election, 2006: Moran
Party	Candidate	Votes	%	±%
INC	Jibantara Ghatowar	39,622	45.82	
AGP	Parag Jyoti Baruah	26,267	30.38	
BJP	Dayananda Borgohain	17,037	19.70	
Independent	Hemanta Urang	2,025	2.34	
NBNP	Kiran Moyee Gogoi	932	1.08	
AGP(P)	Jitul Chandra Gogoi	589	0.68	
Majority		13,355	15.44	
Turnout		86,472	75.34	
INC hold		Swing		

== See also ==
- Dibrugarh
- List of constituencies of Assam Legislative Assembly
