= Hitesh Basumatary =

Indian politician

Hitesh Basumatary is an Asom Gana Parishad politician from Assam, India. He has been elected in Assam Legislative Assembly election in 2011 from Chapaguri constituency. In 2016, he joined the United People's Party, Liberal ahead of the Assam election in 2016.
