= Pulok Gohain =

Indian politician (born 1977)

Pulok Gohain (born 1977) is an Indian politician from Assam. He is a member of the Assam Legislative Assembly from the Tinsukia Assembly constituency in Tinsukia district representing the Bharatiya Janata Party.

== Early life and education ==
Gohain is from Makum, Tinsukia district, Assam. He is the son of the late Premodhar Gohain. He passed Class 12 examinations conducted by Assam Higher Secondary Education Council in 1994. He runs his own business. He declared assets worth Rs.3 crores in his affidavit to the Election Commission of India.

== Career ==
Gohain won the Tinsukia Assembly constituency representing the Bharatiya Janata Party in the 2026 Assam Legislative Assembly election. He polled votes and defeated his nearest rival, Devid Phukan of the Indian National Congress, by a margin of 48,497 votes.
