= Sarupathar Assembly constituency =

Constituency of the Assam legislative assembly in India

Sarupathar
- Constituency No. 107 for the Assam Legislative Assembly

Constituency details
- Country: India
- Region: Northeast India
- State: Assam
- District: Golaghat
- Lok Sabha constituency: Kaziranga
- Established: 1967
- Reservation: None

Member of Legislative Assembly
- 16th Assam Legislative Assembly
- Incumbent Biswajit Phukan
- Party: Bharatiya Janata Party
- Elected year: 2026

Sarupathar Assembly constituency is one of the 126 assembly constituencies of Assam Legislative Assembly. Sarupathar forms part of the Kaziranga Lok Sabha constituency.

== Members of the Legislative Assembly ==
Election	Member	Party affiliation
1967	Chatra Gopal Karmakar	Indian National Congress
1972	Chatra Gopal Karmakar	Indian National Congress
1978	Aklius Tirkey	Indian National Congress
1983	Abdul Matlib	Indian National Congress
1985	Binod Gowal	Independent
1991	Binod Gowal	Asom Gana Parishad
1996	Binod Gowal	Asom Gana Parishad
2001	Aklius Tirkey	Indian National Congress
2006	Binod Gowal	Asom Gana Parishad
2011	Aklius Tirkey	Indian National Congress
2016	Roselina Tirkey	Indian National Congress
2021	Biswajit Phukan	Bharatiya Janata Party

== Election results ==
=== 2026 ===
2026 Assam Legislative Assembly election: Sarupathar
Party	Candidate	Votes	%	±%
BJP	Biswajit Phukan	96341	63.87	
AJP	Jibon Chutia	40261	26.69	
JMM	SAHIL MUNDA	11852	7.86	
NOTA	NOTA	2386	1.58	
Margin of victory		56080		
Turnout		150840		
Rejected ballots				
Registered electors				
BJP hold		Swing		

=== 2021 ===
2021 Assam Legislative Assembly election: Sarupathar
Party	Candidate	Votes	%	±%
BJP	Biswajit Phukan	107,100	51.49	
INC	Roselina Tirkey	67,731	32.57	N/A
NOTA	None of the above	2,945	1.42	N/A
Majority				
Turnout		207,986	77.72	
Registered electors		267,596		
BJP gain from INC		Swing		
