= Digendra Purkayastha =

Indian politician

Member of the Assam Legislative Assembly
- In office 1985–1991
- Preceded by: Sisir Ranjan Das
- Succeeded by: Parimal Suklabaidya
- Constituency: Dholai

Personal details
- Party: Indian National Congress

Digendra Purkayastha is an Indian politician from Assam. He was elected to the Assam Legislative Assembly from Dholai constituency in the 1985 election as a member of the Indian National Congress.
