= Panery Assembly constituency =

Constituency of the Assam legislative assembly in India

Coordinates: 26.74°N 91.91°E

Panery
- Former constituency No. 64 for the Assam Legislative Assembly

Constituency details
- Country: India
- Region: Northeast India
- State: Assam
- District: Udalguri
- Lok Sabha constituency: Mangaldoi
- Established: 1967
- Abolished: 2023
- Reservation: None

Panery Assembly constituency was one of the 126 assembly constituencies of Assam Legislative Assembly. Panery formed part of the Mangaldoi Lok Sabha constituency. This constituency was abolished in 2023.

== Members of Legislative Assembly ==
Election	Member	Party affiliation
1967	Hiralal Patwari	Independent
1972	Ramesh Chandra Saharia	Indian National Congress
1978	Ramesh Chandra Saharia	Independent
1983	Mridula Saharia	Indian National Congress
1985	Durga Das Boro	Independent
1991	Karendra Basumatari	Indian National Congress
1996	Kumud Chandra Das	Indian National Congress
2001	Kamali Basumatari	Indian National Congress
2006	Kamali Basumatari	Indian National Congress
2011	Kamali Basumatari	Bodoland People's Front
2016	Kamali Basumatari	Bodoland People's Front
2021	Biswajit Daimary	Bharatiya Janata Party

== Election results ==
=== 2021 ===
2021 Assam Legislative Assembly election: Panery
Party	Candidate	Votes	%	±%
BJP	Biswajit Daimary	72,639	60.82	
BPF	Karuna Kanta Swargiary	36,787	30.80	
Independent	Biswajit Minj	2,533	2.12	
NOTA	None of the above	2,335	1.95	
Voters Party International	Bhumitra Kachari	2,103	1.76	
Independent	Bapan Banik	1,762	1.48	
SUCI(C)	Swarnalata Chaliha	1,280	1.07	
Majority		35,852	30.02	
Turnout		119,439	82.37	
Registered electors		145,006		
BJP gain from BPF		Swing		

=== 2016 ===
2016 Assam Legislative Assembly election: Panery
Party	Candidate	Votes	%	±%
BPF	Kamali Basumatari	38668	35.93	
Independent	Nanda Ram Baro	22866	21.25	
INC	Durgadas Boro	19089	17.74	
Independent	Prabhat Das Panika	12812	11.91	
Independent	Sudhendu Mohan Talukdar	3644	3.39	
Independent	Bikan Chandra Deka	3276	3.04	
NOTA	None Of The Above	2427	2.26	
Independent	Mahesh Chandra Sarma	1978	1.84	
Independent	Dina Nath Das	1489	1.38	
SUCI(C)	Swarnalata Chaliha	1364	1.27	
Majority		15802		
Turnout		107613		
Registered electors		132,355		
BPF gain from		Swing	{{{swing}}}	
