= Kamali Basumatari =

Indian politician

Kamali Basumatari is a Bodoland People's Front politician from Assam, India. She was elected to the Assam Legislative Assembly in the 2001, 2006, 2011 and 2016 election from Panery constituency.
