= Urkhao Gwra Brahma =

Indian politician and poet

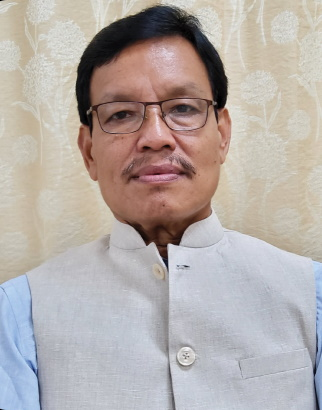

Cabinet Minister, Assam
- In office 10 May 2021 – 18 October 2025
- Chief Minister: Himanta Biswa Sarma
- Departments: Handloom, Textiles and Sericulture; Soil Conservation; Welfare of Bodoland (2021–24)

Member, Assam Legislative Assembly
- In office 2 May 2021 – 4 May 2026
- Preceded by: Thaneswar Basumatary
- Constituency: Chapaguri

Member of Parliament, Rajya Sabha
- In office 10 April 2002 – 9 April 2008
- Constituency: Assam

Personal details
- Born: 1 July 1963 (age 63)
- Party: United People's Party Liberal (since 2015)
- Other political affiliations: Independent (2002–2015)
- Website: upplofficial.com

Urkhao Gwra Brahma (born 1 July 1963) is an Indian politician, poet, and the leader of the United People's Party, Liberal (UPPL). He has been serving as the Minister for Handloom, Textile & Sericulture, Soil Conservation, and Welfare of Bodoland Department in the Government of Assam since 2021. Representing the 63 No. Chapaguri constituency in the Assam Legislative Assembly since 2021, he has played a significant role in the political and cultural landscape of Assam.

Previously, he was a Member of Parliament in the Rajya Sabha from 2002 to 2008 as an independent candidate. Alongside his political journey, he is deeply involved in literature and was honored with the Sahitya Akademi Award in 2014 for his poetry collection उदांनिफ्राय गिदिंबोफिन्नानै (Return from Freedom). In 2015, he founded the UPPL and became its president.

His contributions to Bodo literature have been widely recognized, and on 1 March 2025, he was honored with the prestigious विशिष्ट क्षेत्रीय भाषा सम्मान (बिनेश्वर ब्रह्म शिखर सम्मान) at the BPA Foundation & India Netbooks Sahityakar Sammanotsav 2025 in New Delhi.

== See also ==
- Boro language (India)
- Literature from North East India
- List of Indian poets
