= Thaneswar Basumatary =

Indian politician (born 1966)

- Constituency: Chapaguri

Personal details
- Born: 1 December 1966 (age 59) Barpam, Bhalmanuhar Vitha, Baksa, Assam, India
- Party: Bodoland People's Front
- Spouse: Smt. Rajo Basumatary (1990 - )
- Occupation: Teacher, politician
- Website: www.assamassembly.gov.in/thaneswar-basumatary.html

Thaneswar Basumatary is a Bodoland People's Front politician from Assam. He was elected in the Assam Legislative Assembly election in 2016 from Chapaguri constituency. Previously, he was MLA from the same constituency in 2006 from Bodoland People's Front .

== Background ==
He was born to father, Lt. Golak Basumatary, and mother, Lt. Thaoni Basumatary in Barpam Village. He completed his schooling from Barpam Gudi Poraisali and Chapaguri Kolklabari ME & High School. His highest qualification is Bachelor of Science. After his graduation, he served as a science teacher in Chapaguri Kolklabari ME & High School before contesting his first Assam Legislative Assembly election in the year 2006. His hobbies include football, volleyball, and carrom. He has been married since 1990 to Smt. Rajo Basumatary and have 3 children together (2 sons and a daughter). He contests from 63 No. Chapaguri (ST) constituency and represents Bodoland People's Front in the Assam Legislative Assembly.
