= Suagpur =

Suwagpur
- Village
- Location in Assam, India Suwagpur (India)
- Coordinates: 26.69°N 91.71°E
- [Tamulpur district[Tamulpur]]: India
- State: Assam
- Region: Western Assam
- District: Tamulpur
- <-- Established -->: 2022
- Founder: Mistahcruz

Government
  - Body: Gram Panchayat Suwagpur Police Station
- Elevation: 42 m (138 ft)

Languages
  - Official: Nepali, Assamese, Bodo
- Time zone: UTC+5:30 (IST)
- PIN: 781364
- Vehicle registration: AS
- Website: tamulpur.nic.in

Suwagpur is a village in Tamulpur District, situated in north bank of river Brahmaputra, surrounded by Bangalipara, Oubari, Goreswar, Naokata and Baihata

== Transport ==
The village is located north of National Highway 31, connected to nearby towns and cities with regular buses and other modes of transportation.

== See also ==
- Goreswar
- Bangalipara
