= Rabiram Narzary =

Indian politician

Assam Legislative Assembly
- Incumbent
- Assumed office 4 May 2026
- Constituency: Dotma Assembly constituency
- In office 2016–2021
- Constituency: Kokrajhar West Assembly constituency

Personal details
- Party: Bodoland People's Front
- Profession: Politician

Rabiram Narzary is a Bodoland People's Front politician from Assam, India. He was elected to the Assam Legislative Assembly in the 2016 election, from the Kokrajhar West constituency.
