= Binod Gowal =

Indian politician

Binod Gowal is an Asom Gana Parishad politician from Assam, India. He was elected to Assam Legislative Assembly in 1985, 1991, 1996 and 2006 from Sarupathar constituency.
