= Kamala Kanta Kalita =

Indian politician

Dr. Kamala Kanta Kalita
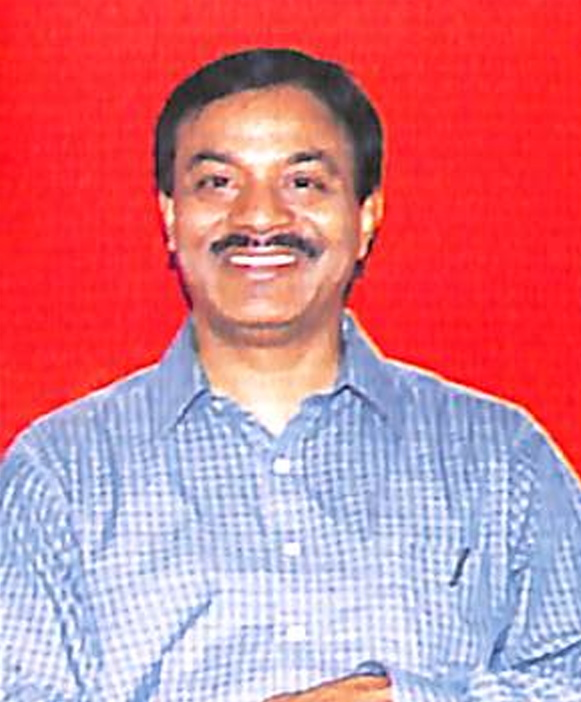
- Kalita in 2006

General Secretary of Asom Gana Parishad

Cabinet Minister, Government of Assam
- In office 24 May 2016 – 10 May 2021
- Chief Minister: Prafulla Kumar Mahanta

Chairman of Khadi and Village Industries Board, Assam
- In office 2010–2012

Member, Assam Legislative Assembly
- Incumbent
- Assumed office 19 May 2016
- Preceded by: Rana Goswami
- Constituency: Choygaon
- In office 2001–2011
- Succeeded by: Pallab Lochan Das
- Constituency: Choygaon

Personal details
- Born: 24 January 1957 (age 69) Kamrup district, Assam
- Party: Asom Gana Parishad
- Spouse: Smt. Jone Kalita
- Parent(s): Kalita(Father); Kalita(Mother)

Dr. Kamala Kanta Kalita is an Indian politician and General Secretary of the Asom Gana Parishad. Dr. Kalita has been Health and Family Welfare Minister of Assam twice and a member of the Assam Legislative Assembly from the Chaygaon constituency in Kamrup district.
