= Lawrence Islary =

Indian politician

Member of Assam Legislative Assembly
- Incumbent
- Assumed office 21 May 2021
- Preceded by: Pramila Rani Brahma
- Constituency: Kokrajhar East

Personal details
- Party: United People's Party Liberal
- Profession: Politician

Lawrence Islary is an Indian politician from Assam. He was elected to the Assam Legislative Assembly from Kokrajhar East in the 2021 Assam Legislative Assembly election as a member of the United People's Party, Liberal.
