= Dotma Assembly constituency =

Assembly constituency of Assam

Dotma
- Constituency No. 2 for the Assam Legislative Assembly

Constituency details
- Country: India
- Region: Northeast India
- State: Assam
- Division: Lower Assam
- District: Kokrajhar
- Lok Sabha constituency: Kokrajhar
- Established: 2023
- Reservation: ST

Member of Legislative Assembly
- 16th Assam Legislative Assembly
- Incumbent Rabiram Narzary
- Party: BPF
- Alliance: NDA
- Elected year: 2026

Dotma Assembly constituency is one of 126 assembly constituencies of Assam, a northeastern state in India. It was newly formed in 2023. The constituency covers the town of Dotma.

== Election Results ==
=== 2026 ===
2026 Assam Legislative Assembly election: Dotma
Party	Candidate	Votes	%	±%
BPF	Rabiram Narzary	48,775	51.74	
UPPL	Raju Kumar Narzary	24,492	25.98	
INC	Birkhang Boro	15,410	16.35	
Independent	Fungkha Brahma	3,740	3.97	
Independent	Rananjay Narzary	719	0.76	
NOTA	None of the above	1,138	1.21	
Margin of victory		24,283	25.75	
Turnout		94,274	86.47	
Registered electors		1,07,011		
BPF win (new seat)				

== See also ==
- List of constituencies of Assam Legislative Assembly
