= Amiya Kanti Das =

Indian politician (born 1970)

Member of Assam Legislative Assembly
- Incumbent
- Assumed office 4 May 2026
- Constituency: Dholai

Personal details
- Party: Bharatiya Janata Party
- Profession: Politician

Amiya Kanti Das (born 1970) is an Indian politician from Assam. He is a member of the Assam Legislative Assembly from the Dholai Assembly constituency which is reserved for Scheduled Caste community in Cachar district representing the Bharatiya Janata Party.

== Early life and education ==
Das is from Dholai, Cachar district, Assam. He is the son of the late Urjya Moni Das. He completed his Master of Arts in political science at Krishna Kanta Handique State Open University, in the year 2023. He is an LIC agent and his wife is an advocate. He declared assets worth Rs.69 lakhs in his affidavit to the Election Commission of India.

== Career ==
Das won the Dholai Assembly constituency representing the Bharatiya Janata Party in the 2026 Assam Legislative Assembly election. He polled 1,00,634 votes and defeated his nearest rival, Dhrubajyoti Purkayastha of the Indian National Congress, by a margin of 44,462 votes.
