= Rupohihat Assembly constituency =

Constituency of the Assam legislative assembly in India

Rupahihat
- Constituency No. 56 for the Assam Legislative Assembly

Constituency details
- Country: India
- Region: Northeast India
- State: Assam
- District: Nagaon
- Lok Sabha constituency: Nagaon
- Established: 1957
- Reservation: None

Rupohihat Assembly constituency is one of the 126 assembly constituencies of Assam Legislative Assembly. Rupohihat forms part of the Nagaon Lok Sabha constituency.

== Members of Legislative Assembly ==
Election	Member	Party affiliation
1957	Mohammad Idris	Indian National Congress
1962	Abu Nasar Mohammad Ohid	Indian National Congress
1967	M. A Mossabir	Independent
1972	Mohammad Idris	Indian National Congress
1978	Mohammad Idris	Indian National Congress
1983	Mohammad Idris	Indian National Congress
1985	Rashidul Haque	Independent
1991	Rashidul Haque	Indian National Congress
1996	Rashidul Haque	Indian National Congress
2001	Sarifa Begum	Indian National Congress
2006	Abdul Aziz	Asom Gana Parishad
2011	Mazibur Rahman	All India United Democratic Front
2016	Nurul Huda	Indian National Congress
2021	Nurul Huda	Indian National Congress

== Election results ==
=== 2026 ===
2026 Assam Legislative Assembly election: Rupohihat
Party	Candidate	Votes	%	±%
INC	Nurul Huda	135682	61.46	
AIUDF	Aminul Islam	65916	29.86	
AGP	Jakir Hussain Farazi	14946	6.77	
NOTA	NOTA	1160	0.53	
Margin of victory		69766		
Turnout		220747		
Rejected ballots				
Registered electors				
INC hold		Swing		

=== 2016 ===
2016 Assam Legislative Assembly election: Rupohihat
Party	Candidate	Votes	%	±%
INC	Nurul Huda	72,627	47.50	
AIUDF	Nurul Amin Chowdhury	50,783	33.21	
BJP	Jakaria Haque Chowdhury	15,963	10.44	
Independent	Abdul Aziz	9,671	6.32	
JCP	Abu Hanifa	1,019	0.66	
Independent	Faizur Rahman	901	0.58	
Independent	Biju Boro	709	0.46	
Independent	Nazir Hussain	419	0.27	
NOTA	None of the above	803	0.52	
Majority		21,844	14.29	
Turnout		1,52,895	91.23	
Registered electors		1,67,578		
INC gain from AIUDF		Swing		

== See also ==
- List of constituencies of the Assam Legislative Assembly
- Nagaon district
