= Kokrajhar Assembly constituency =

Assembly constituency of Assam

Kokrajhar
- Constituency No. 3 for the Assam Legislative Assembly

Constituency details
- Country: India
- Region: Northeast India
- State: Assam
- Division: Lower Assam
- District: Kokrajhar
- Lok Sabha constituency: Kokrajhar
- Established: 2023
- Reservation: ST

Member of Legislative Assembly
- 16th Assam Legislative Assembly
- Incumbent Sewli Mohilary
- Party: BPF
- Alliance: NDA
- Elected year: 2026

Kokrajhar Assembly constituency is one of the 126 assembly constituencies of Assam a north east state of India. It was newly formed in 2023.

== Election results ==
=== 2026 ===
2026 Assam Legislative Assembly election: Kokrajhar
Party	Candidate	Votes	%	±%
BPF	Sewli Mohilary	74,816	60.84	
UPPL	Lawrence Islary	35,183	28.61	
INC	Manik Chandra Brahma	7,011	5.70	
Voters Party International	Tonon Daimary	1,446	1.18	
NOTA	NOTA	1,859	1.51	
Margin of victory		39,633	32.7	
Turnout		1,22,963	84.0	
BPF win (new seat)				

== See also ==
- List of constituencies of Assam Legislative Assembly
