= Biswajit Phukan =

Indian politician

Member of Legislative Assembly Sarupathar
- Incumbent
- Assumed office 2021
- Constituency: Sarupathar

Personal details
- Born: Assam
- Party: Bharatiya Janata Party
- Education: Gauhati University
- Occupation: Politician

Biswajit Phukan is a Bharatiya Janata Party politician from the Indian state of Assam. He has been elected to the Assam Legislative Assembly in the 2021 elections from Sarupathar.

== Early life ==
He is the son of Rajen Phukan and resides in Changpul Gaon village in Golaghat district. He earned his MA degree from Gauhati University in 1997. His wife is Prapti Thakur, a principal at Sarupathar College and they have a daughter.

== Career ==
He is a former vice-chairman of Assam State Cooperative Bank. He contested the 2021 Assam Legislative Assembly election from Sarupathar constituency and won the seat with 1,07,090 votes.
