= Chaygaon Assembly constituency =

Assembly constituency of Assam, India

Coordinates: 26.05°N 91.39°E

Chaygaon
- Former constituency No. 49 for the Assam Legislative Assembly

Constituency details
- Country: India
- Region: Northeast India
- State: Assam
- District: Kamrup
- Lok Sabha constituency: Gauhati Lok Sabha constituency
- Established: 1967
- Abolished: 2023
- Reservation: None

Chaygaon Assembly constituency was one of the 126 assembly constituencies of Assam Legislative Assembly. Chaygaon formed part of the Gauhati Lok Sabha constituency.

This constituency was abolished in 2023.

== Town Details ==
Following are details on Chaygaon Assembly constituency-

- Country: India.
- State: Assam.
- District: Kamrup district .
- Lok Sabha Constituency: Gauhati Lok Sabha/Parliamentary constituency.
- Assembly Categorisation: Rural constituency.
- Eligible Electors as per 2021 General Elections: 1,92,597 Eligible Electors. Male Electors:96,743 . Female Electors: 95,851 .
- Geographic Co-Ordinates: 25°54'04.7"N 91°17'43.1"E.
- Total Area Covered: 694 square kilometres.
- Area Includes: Chaygaon thana (excluding Dakhin Sarubongsor mouza) and Bongaon mouza in Boko thana in Gauhati sub-division, of Kamrup district of Assam.
- Inter State Border :Kamrup.

== Members of the Legislative Assembly ==
Following is the list of past members representing Chabua Assembly constituency in Assam Legislature.

- 1957: Harendra Goswami , Praja Socialist Party
- 1962: Harendra Nath Talukdar, Indian National Congress
- 1967: Harendra Goswami , Indian National Congress
- 1972: Satyavati Goswami, Indian National Congress.
- 1978: A. N. Akram Hussain, Indian National Congress (Indira).
- 1983: Harendra Nath Talukdar, Indian National Congress.
- 1985: Dr. Kamala Kanta Kalita, Independent.
- 1991: Dr. Kamala Kanta Kalita, Asom Gana Parishad.
- 1996: Dr. Kamala Kanta Kalita, Asom Gana Parishad.
- 2001: Rana Goswami, Indian National Congress.
- 2006: Dr. Kamala Kanta Kalita, Asom Gana Parishad.
- 2011: Rekibuddin Ahmed, Indian National Congress.
- 2016: Rekibuddin Ahmed, Indian National Congress.

Election	Name	Party
2021	Rekibuddin Ahmed	Indian National Congress

== Election results ==
=== 2016 ===
2016 Assam Legislative Assembly election: Chaygaon
Party	Candidate	Votes	%	±%
INC	Rekibuddin Ahmed	72,211	49.65	
AGP	Kamalkant Kalita	64,390	44.28	
AIUDF	Derajuddin Ahmed	4,984	3.42	
Independent	Beckniur Marak	2,225	1.53	
NOTA	None of the above	1,601	1.10	
Majority		7,821	5.37	
Turnout		1,45,411	90.77	
Registered electors		1,60,183		
INC hold		Swing		
