= Tinsukia Assembly constituency =

Constituency of the Assam legislative assembly in India

Tinsukia
- Constituency No. 86 for the Assam Legislative Assembly

Constituency details
- Country: India
- Region: Northeast India
- State: Assam
- District: Tinsukia
- Lok Sabha constituency: Dibrugarh
- Established: 1957
- Reservation: None

Tinsukia Assembly constituency is one of the 126 assembly constituencies of Assam a north east state of India. Tinsukia is also part of Dibrugarh Lok Sabha constituency.

== Members of Legislative Assembly ==
INC JP BJP

Election	Member	Party
1957	Radha Kishen Khemka	Indian National Congress
1962	Radha Kishen Khemka	Indian National Congress
1967	Paramananda Gogoi	Indian National Congress
1972	Paramananda Gogoi	Indian National Congress
1978	Golap Borbora	Janata Party
1983	Rajendra Nath Phukan	Indian National Congress
1985	Shio Shambu Ojha	Indian National Congress
1991	Shio Shambu Ojha	Indian National Congress
1996	Sudhangshu Coomer De Sirkar	Indian National Congress
2001	Rajendra Prasad Singh	Indian National Congress
2006	Rajendra Prasad Singh	Indian National Congress
2011	Rajendra Prasad Singh	Indian National Congress
2016	Sanjoy Kishan	Bharatiya Janata Party
2021	Sanjoy Kishan	Bharatiya Janata Party
2026	Pulok Gohain	Bharatiya Janata Party

== Election results ==
=== 2026 ===
2026 Assam Legislative Assembly election: Tinsukia
Party	Candidate	Votes	%	±%
BJP	Pulok Gohain	85,184	62.72	
INC	Devid Phukan	36,687	27.01	
NOTA	NOTA	2,407	1.77	
Margin of victory		48,497	35.70%	
Turnout		135,818		
Rejected ballots				
Registered electors				
BJP hold		Swing		

=== 2016 ===
2016 Assam Legislative Assembly election: Tinsukia
Party	Candidate	Votes	%	±%
BJP	Sanjoy Kishan	70,937	61.24	+29.91
INC	Rajendra Prasad Singh	35,868	30.96	−13.19
Independent	Lakhyajyoti Boruah	4,056	3.50	N/A
NCP	Cintu Baruah	1,020	0.88	N/A
JCP	Ananta Jyoti Bhattacharjee	773	0.66	N/A
Independent	Ram Darshan Singh	637	0.54	N/A
SS	Ram Narayan Singh	536	0.46	−1.77
NOTA	None of the above	1,986	1.71	N/A
Majority		35,069	30.28	+17.46
Turnout		1,15,822	80.34	+13.48
Registered electors		1,44,163		
BJP gain from INC		Swing	+8.36	

=== 2011 ===
2011 Assam Legislative Assembly election: Tinsukia
Party	Candidate	Votes	%	±%
INC	Rajendra Prasad Singh	41,238	44.15	
BJP	Sanjoy Kishan	29,265	31.33	
AGP	Monoranjan Sharma	15,567	16.67	
AITC	Rajen Baruah	3,020	3.23	
AIUDF	Ananta Hazarika	2,224	2.38	
SS	Ram Narayan Singh	2,085	2.23	
Majority		11,973	12.82	
Turnout		93,399	66.86	
INC hold		Swing		

== See also ==
- Tinsukia
- Tinsukia district
- List of constituencies of Assam Legislative Assembly
