= Plain Tribals Council of Assam =

- Founder: Biruson Doley
- Founded: 27 February 1967
- Colours: Blue

The Plain Tribals Council of Assam is a political party in the Indian state of Assam which began in the later half of the sixties.

== PTCA is founded by Bhimbor Deori ==
In 1967, the PTCA launched an agitation for a separate state for the plains tribal communities of Assam state, to be called 'Udayachal', under the leadership of Samar Brahma Chowdhury and Charan Narzary, President and General Secretary of PTCA respectively. Narzary died in 2019.

In 1968 PTCA boycotted the state Assembly Election on demand of re-delimitation of the Tribal and indigenous Scheduled Caste Reserved constituencies. Both the PTCA President and General secretary were arrested and jailed under the Preventive Detention Act. Few days after following the Tribal and indigenous Scheduled Caste movement under PTCA the local Administration imposed the law of 144.

Thousands of tribal and indigenous Scheduled Caste communities gathered in a field of Bhatarmari village and the mass moved towards the administrative office to submit their appeal of demand to the District Commissioner. The police fires indiscriminately on the charge of violation of 144, hundred of the demonstrators had got bullet injuries, many of them admitted in Kokrajhar Govt. Hospital. Hundreds of demonstrators were arrested and jailed on non bailable act.

The Central Government agreed to provide Autonomous Council against the demand of Udayachal statehood of PTCA. But PTCA rejected the offer of Autonomous Council and sustained to their demand for Udayachal statehood. It was a nonviolent democratic movement, the Government was trying to sabotage.

The ideological difference and conflict was weakening the solidarity of PTCA movement for statehood. A section of members of PTCA broke way themselves and decided to go and fight with arms for the Udayachal statehood under the leadership of Binay Brahma. The Government remained indifferent and passive to the PTCA demand, tried to defuse by lingering and taking time.

In the meantime the All Bodo Students Union was emerging with a political aspiration to move for Bodoland statehood rejecting the PTCA's Udayachol statehood. The President and some leaders of PTCA were assassinated by the extremist group of the ABSU. The PTCA's movement for Udayachal, a greater tribal and indigenous Scheduled Caste communities land was rejected by the young generation of the Bodos.

The ABSU finally accepted the Autonomous Council of Bodoland. In the present political scenario Bodoland is facing a conflict with the non Bodo groups of tribes and indigenous Scheduled Caste communities who also lives within the Bodoland. The non Bodo tribes and Scheduled Caste feel they are second citizens of Bodoland. In true sense Bodoland is for all the communities of both tribes and indigenous Scheduled Caste communities who live within the geographical jurisdiction of Bodoland.

The Bodoland Territorial Autonomous District Council (BTADC)is a democratically elected body for administration. The complexity among the various tribes and communities are politically created to sabotage the functioning of BTADC as well as the demand for Bodoland statehood. ABSU the non-political organisation of BTAD was founded by Upendranath Brahma in the year of 1967.

In 1978, PTCA candidate Samar Choudhury was elected from Kokrajhar East Assembly constituency in the 1978 Assam Legislative Assembly election while Panchanan Brahma was elected, also in a ST reserved seat from the neighbouring, Sidli Assembly constituency.

== Members of Legislative Assembly ==
Year	Assembly	Portrait	MLAs	Constituency	Maps
1978			Samar Brahma Choudhury	Kokrajhar East	
1978			Panchanan Brahma	Sidli	
1978			Binoy Kumar Basumatary	Udalguri	
1978			Kamal Chandra Basumatari	Barchalla	
1983			Bimal Gayari	Chapaguri	
1983			Alit Chandra Boro	Barama	
1983			Binoy Kumar Basumatary	Udalguri	
1985			Charan Narzary	Kokrajhar East	
1985			Ganesh Bora	Bijni	
1985			Janendra Basumatary	Sidli	

== List of Ministers ==
Year	Ministers	Ministries	Chief Minister	Ministry
1978	Samar Brahma Choudhury		Golap Borbora	Borbora Ministry
