= Charan Narzary =

Indian politician (1933–2019)

Member of Parliament, Lok Sabha
- In office 1977–1980
- Preceded by: D. Basumatari
- Succeeded by: Samar Brahma Choudhury
- Constituency: Kokrajhar

Personal details
- Born: 28 May 1933 Hatimatha Village, Goalpara district, Assam, British India
- Died: 23 July 2019 (aged 86) Guwahati, Assam
- Party: Plain Tribals Council of Assam
- Spouse: Bhabani Brahma Datta
- Children: Dharitri Narzary, Sangrila Narzary, Kahinoor Narzary, Minila Narzary, Samrat Narzary

Charan Narzary (28 May 1933 – 23 July 2019) was an Indian politician. He was elected to the Lok Sabha, lower house of the Parliament of India from the Kokrajhar in Assam in 1977 as an independent candidate. He founded Plain Tribals Council of Assam (PTCA) in 1966, a militant agitation for a separate tribal and indigenous Scheduled Caste communities state, to be called Udayachal under the leadership of Samar Brahma Chowdhury and Narzary, President and General Secretary of PTCA respectively. He was a poet and writer and was a teacher at Kokrajhar College.
