= Sarat Chandra Sinha =

5th Chief Minister of Assam, India

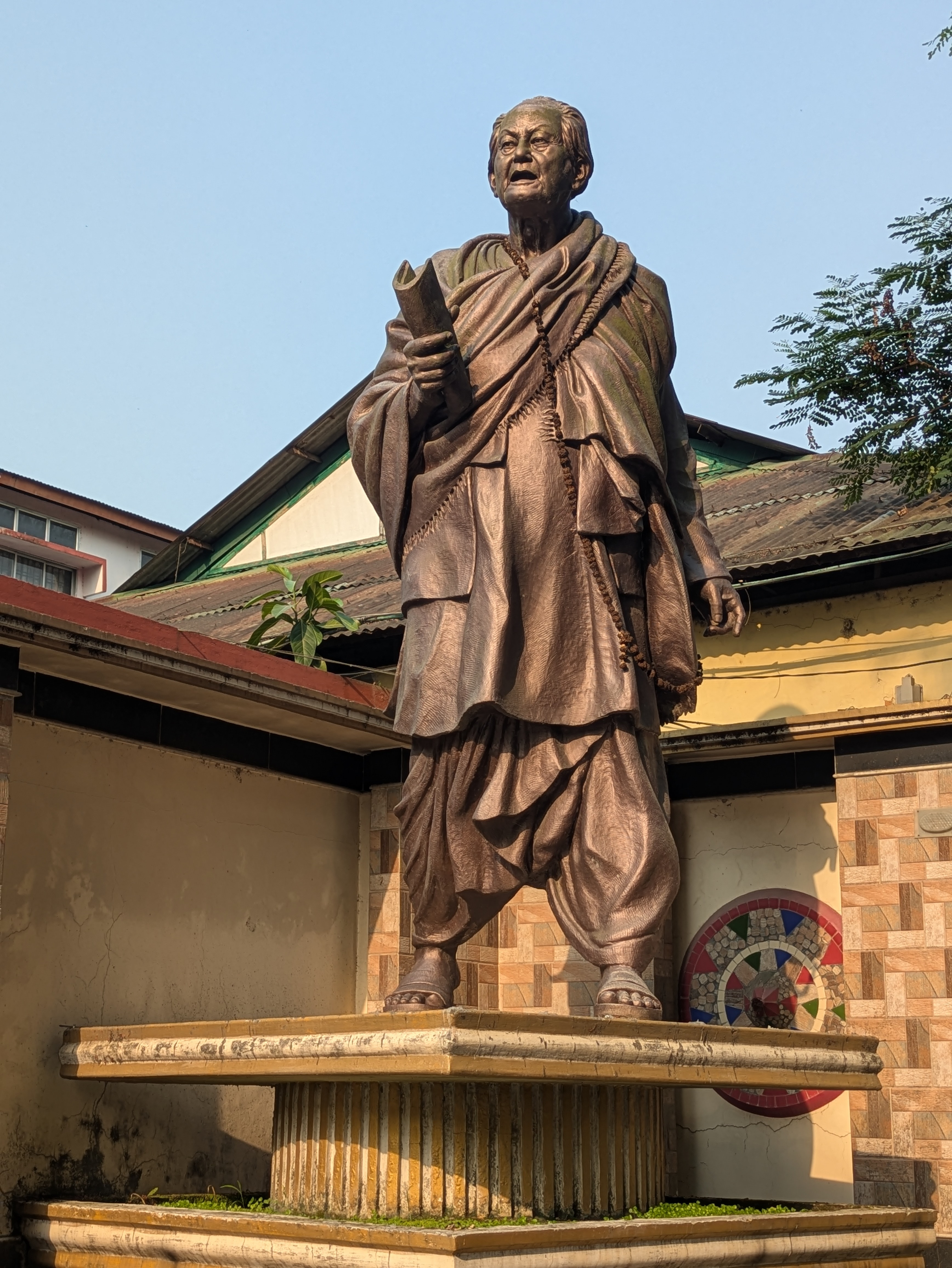
- A statue of Sarat Chandra Sinha near the Dhubri Circuit House

5th Chief Minister of Assam
- In office 31 January 1972 – 12 March 1978
- Governor: Braj Kumar Nehru; Lallan Prasad Singh
- Preceded by: Mahendra Mohan Choudhry
- Succeeded by: Golap Borbora

President, Indian Congress (Socialist) – Sarat Chandra Sinha
- In office 1984–1999

Member of Assam Legislative Assembly
- In office 1985–1991
- Preceded by: Rookmini Kanta Roye
- Succeeded by: Anowar Hussain
- Constituency: Bilasipara East
- In office 1972–1983
- Succeeded by: Rookmini Kanta Roye
- Constituency: Bilasipara East
- In office 1962–67
- Constituency: Bilasipara East
- In office 1946-52
- Constituency: Bilasipara East
- Constituency: Bilasipara East

Personal details
- Born: 1 January 1914 Chapar, Assam Province, British India
- Died: 25 December 2005 (aged 91) Guwahati, Assam, India
- Party: Nationalist Congress Party (1999-2005)
- Other political affiliations: Indian National Congress (1946-1978); Indian National Congress (Socialist) (1978-1984); Indian Congress (Socialist) – Sarat Chandra Sinha (1984-1999)
- Spouse: Labanya Sinha
- Children: 6
- Education: Cotton University (BSc); Banaras Hindu University (LLB)
- Occupation: Teacher; Activist
- Website: www.jananetasaratchandrasinha.com

Sarat Chandra Sinha (1 January 1914 – 25 December 2005) was an Indian politician and Chief Minister of Assam. He was a leader of Indian National Congress, Indian National Congress (Socialist) and Nationalist Congress Party.

== Early life and education ==
Sinha was born in a Rajbanshi family in Bhakatpara village of Chapar under Dhubri district. He belonged to a farmer family. Sinha started schooling from his village school. For secondary education, he attended a High school in Bilasipara known as Indra Narayan Academy Higher Secondary School, about 25 km from his home, a distance what he covered daily on foot or by bicycle. Sinha's father, Lalsingh Sinha ensured that his son always carried his slate and pencil while accompanying him to the paddy fields. Sinha learnt his arithmetic tables by counting his and his father's footsteps to the weekly village market. "Sometimes he would ask me to multiply the footsteps, sometimes divide," Sinha had said, recalling his childhood in a lengthy interview with All India Radio, Guwahati.

Sinha received his bachelor's degree from the Cotton College, Guwahati and subsequently moved to Banaras Hindu University for law education. After getting a law degree, Sinha came back to Guwahati and practised law for a short period and then switched to school teachings. Sinha began his career as a science teacher in a rural school after quitting his MSc in Kolkata in 1940. He was a Gandhian who wore khadi, and taught his students the art of making paper from straw, and was later in different positions from assistant teacher to headmaster in Dhubri district.

== Political career ==
Sinha was elected to the Dhubri local board in 1945 and was later taken to Guwahati by veteran Congress leader Mahendra Mohan Choudhury, who then got him a Congress ticket to contest the state Assembly election of 1946. The party had given him Rs 750 as election campaign expenses, but on completion of the campaign, he returned Rs 250 that remained unspent. He was elected to Assam Legislative assembly four times from Bilasipara east constituency in 1946–52, 1962–67, 1972–78 and 1985–90.

=== Chief Ministership ===
==== Tenure ====
Sinha was first made an interim Chief Minister in 1972 by Indira Gandhi and subsequently became an elected chief minister and served till 1978. He also served the Congress Party in various positions and capacities like the general secretary, vice-president, and president. He later joined Indian National Congress (Socialist) after the emergency era which was imposed by Indira Gandhi and became its national president in 1987.

As chief minister, Sinha shifted the state capital from Shillong to Dispur. He was also chief minister for the carve out of Meghalaya from Assam along with Shillong and the language agitation in 1972, a demand for the introduction of Assamese as the sole medium of instruction in Assam. He engaged unemployed local youth in the construction work of temporary Capital at Dispur. He made the decision to strengthen the Public Distribution System, and as a result 13,615 Nos. of Fair Price shop were established in Assam to distribute essential commodities. He also assisted in providing land and bank loans for landless people. He also started medium irrigation system like Kaldiya, Dekadang, Bardikariya, Jojloi Gaon, Kolong river irrigation scheme etc. In his regime power project in Assam increased up to 43 per cent due to establishment of Boanigaon, Kapili, Lakuwa, Longpi, Bongaigaon thermal project.

Sinha was involved in setting up the Gauhati Medical College and Hospital and Bongaigaon Refinery and Petrochemicals Limited. He believed in decentralisation of power and introduced Panchayati Raj in the State for the welfare of the backward communities.

==== First Motion of No-Confidence ====
The main grounds on which Gaurisankar Bhattacharyya tabled a No-confidence Motion against the Government of Sinha were: 1. profession and practice of the Government had proved to be diametrically opposite; 2. the basic necessities of life had not been assured to the masses; 3. the problem of unemployment had become more acute; 4. prices of essential commodities had risen to unprecedented and spiralling heights; (v) abuse of official positions for securing pecuniary and other benefits; 5. misappropriation of funds of the State; and (vi) maladministration in matters of public services. Leave to move the motion was granted on 29 November 1973. Seven members took part in the discussion held on 4 and 5 December 1973.

Initiating the debate on 4 December 1973, Gaurisankar Bhattacharyya said the people had voted the Ministry to power with an overwhelming majority, but that their hopes and aspirations proved to be short-lived. He cited examples of the Government's policies and its failure to eliminate poverty. Bhattacharyya also gave examples of how Calcutta had gained from the oil company and tea industry situated in Assam, thereby resulting in heavy losses to the State exchequer. He further alleged that the Government had cut down expenditure in the important fields of social welfare and had lost its credibility. The education policy of the Government had not helped the people at all and several anomalies were found in the education system. Healso referred to the growing unemployment problem and demanded 80 per cent reservation in the Government and semi-Government jobs for the local people. He further alleged that the Government's policy for the eradication of corruption was far from satisfactory.

Replying to the debate, Sinha explained in detail about the cooperative movement and said that the entire State had been uniformly divided into 663 societies and about 30 lakh families were represented in the cooperatives. He further said that power would be decentralised at the sub divisional level and the cropping pattern would also be changed. Referring to tea estates, he said that in pursuance of the resolution passed by the House that the ownership of the tea gardens in the State should be taken over, a Committee had been constituted to examine the feasibility of the proposal. He said that agricultural income had not increased in the same proportion as industrial income and it was easy to develop industries faster than agriculture, because within the limited resources, agricultural income could be increased to a certain extent. He refuted the allegation that the Government had not taken any action on the PWD corruption case and said that departmental proceedings against three officers were in progress.

The motion failed by voice vote.

==== Second Motion of No-Confidence ====
On 18 September 1974, Gaurisankar Bhattacharyya (CPI) moved the second Motion of No-confidence against Sinha's Cabinet on the grounds of the general failure of the administration on different fronts, particularly in the food front which had led to famine and near-famine conditions causing starvation deaths in different parts of the State. Leave of the House was granted on 16 September 1974. The debate on the motion lasted 2 hours and 30 minutes spanning two days in which 28 members participated. Moving the motion, Gaurisankar Bhattacharyya charged that the administration of the Government was an offensive one; the Government machinery was corrupt and antipathic to the people. Referring to the sufferings of the people during floods, he said that although newspapers were giving vivid and graphic descriptions of starvation deaths, the Government denied this and attributed the death to malnutrition or some disease. He said that all development programmes were directed for the benefit of the elite class. Quoting statistics from the Government documents, he criticised the Government for destroying the financial resources and bringing not only financial ruin but bankruptcy. He also levelled charges of misuse of raw materials procured for pipes and fittings in North Cachar.

In his reply, Sinha read out the letter requesting the Government of India to allot raw material to the Government of Assam for meeting the demand of pipes and fittings for North Cachar Hills District Council, Haflong and said precautionary measures had been taken to prevent any misuse of raw materials. If there was any such misuse of raw material, the Government would definitely make an inquiry and necessary action would be taken against the concerned party.

The motion put to vote on 19 September 1974 and failed with 13 members voting in favour and 78 members voting against it.

==== Third Motion of No-Confidence ====
The third Motion of No confidence against the Ministry of Sinha was moved on 1 November 1977. Leave to move the motion was granted on 31 October 1977. The debate on the motion was held for 3 days. Moving the motion, Gaurisankar Bhattacharyya alleged that Sinha had joined the procession on 9 October in the streets of Guwahati demanding curbing of price rise, resignation of the Union Home Minister, Charan Singh, stopping of atrocities on Harijans and undemocratic activities of the Janata Government. He wondered if Sinha, who was also the Home Minister of the State, behaved in this manner whether that amounted to inciting lawlessness or rebellion. He accused that the Goverrument had not utilised 13 cores of rupees given for fighting floods and extending relief to the people and was misusing it for political and party purposes.

Replying to the debate on 3 November 1977, Sinha thanked the centre for conceding to the State's point of view on the matter of grants and said that there was a financial relation between a State and the centre and under that relationship, the centre was certainly under obligation to help the State. If any help comes, that should not be construed as favour from the centre. Whatever was due must be paid to the State. He denied the charge that the financial position of the State was weak and said that because of economic discipline introduced in 1972, there was no overdraft problem and the ways and means position had improved considerably.

The motion failed with 22 members voting in favour and 68 members voting against and 4 members abstaining.

=== Post-Chief Ministership ===
When Sharad Pawar left the Congress to form the Nationalist Congress Party, he joined him and led the party in Assam till his death.

He attended literary discussion at the age of 90, drama workshop, dharna, hunger strike or trade union meeting.

== Personal life ==
Sinha was married to his wife, Labanya, and they had three sons and three daughters. His eldest son died before him. His wife, Labanya Sinha, died on 21 September 2017, aged 89, Beltola, after being unwell for several days. Several political leaders including Chief Minister Sarbananda Sonowal paid tribute to her.

=== Death and funeral ===
On 24 December 2005, Sinha was admitted to Gauhati Medical College, after he had a fever and was being treated for renal failure. After his condition deteriorated in the night, he was shifted to the ICU. On 25 December, at 1.30 AM, Sinha died due to old-age ailments, a week before his 92nd birthday. The government declared three days of official mourning for Sinha. He was cremated with full state honours at the Nabagraha crematorium in the city.

Chief minister Tarun Gogoi was among the first to reach Sinha's residence at Beltola to pay tribute. He described the Sinha's death as "the end of a political era." Leader of the Opposition Brindaban Goswami described Sinha as "an idealist and an exemplary leader who led his life with moral conviction and simplicity."

== Legacy ==
On 28 September 2020, Chief Minister Sarbananda Sonowal on Monday unveiled a life-size statue of Sinha at Ratnapith College at Chapar in Dhubri district. Sonowal also inaugurated a complex consisting of a memorial garden in the name of Sarat Chandra Sinha, an auditorium, stage and a renovated house of Sinha. Sonowal said that Sinha was "an embodiment of truth, honesty, simplicity and dedication."

== Picture Gallery ==
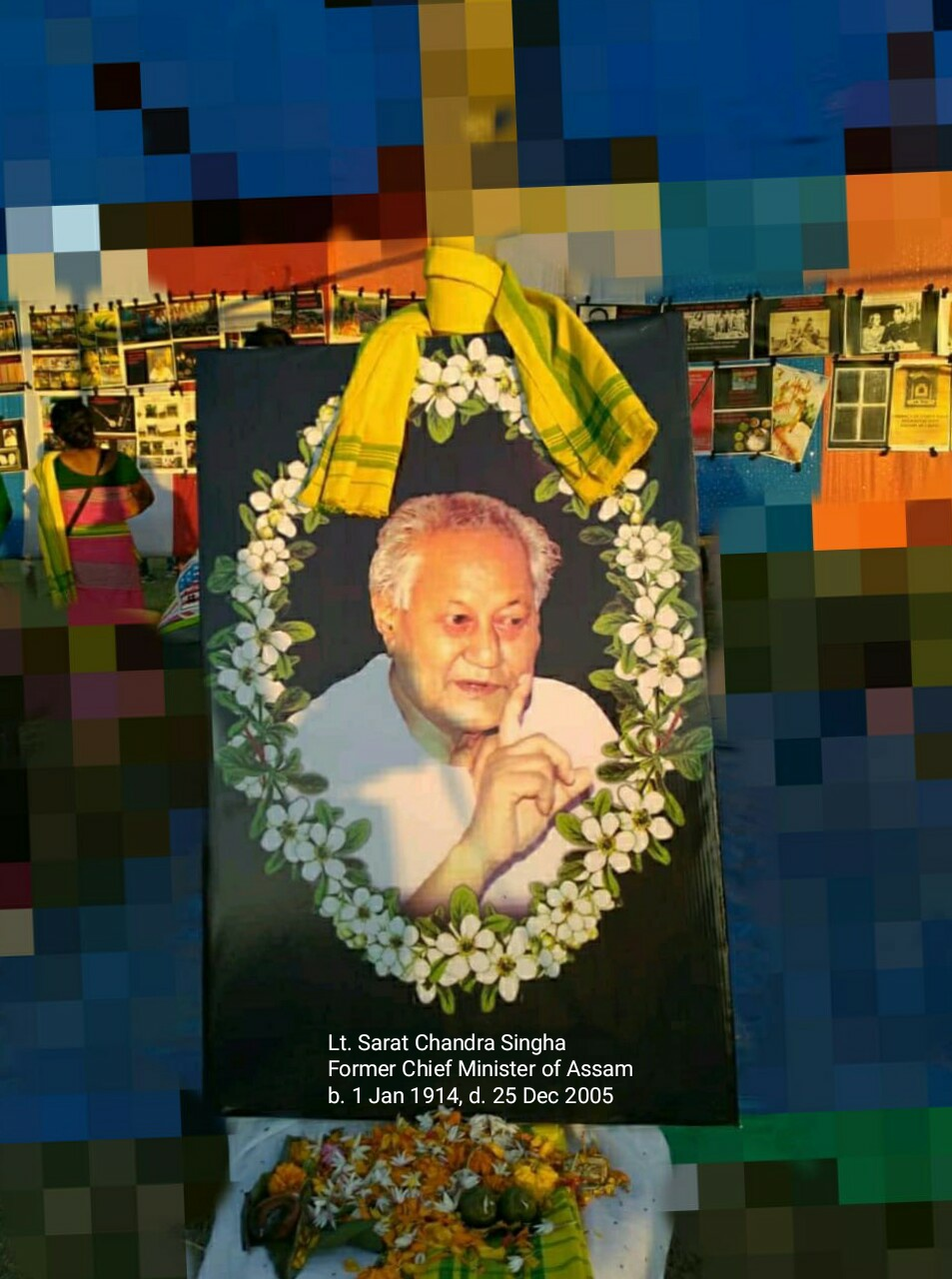
Portrait of Sarat Chandra Sinha
