= 1978 Assam Legislative Assembly election =

Legislative Assembly election

- 25 February 1978

All 126 seats in the Legislature of Assam 64 seats needed for a majority
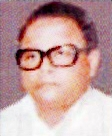
	First party	Second party
		INC
Leader	Golap Borbora	-
Party	Janata Party	Indian National Congress
Leader since	1978	-
Leader's seat	Tinsukia	-
Last election	New	95
Seats won	53	34
Seat change	New	▼61
Percentage	27.55%	32.4%
Swing	New	▼20.8pp
CM before election
Sarat Chandra Singha
INC
Elected CM
Golap Borbora
JP

The 1978 Assam Legislative Assembly election was held to elect members for 126 assembly seats to constitute the seventh Assam Legislative Assembly on February 25 1978. The Janata Party formed the first non-Congress government led by Golap Borbora with 53 seats on March 12, 1978. He resigned as chief minister on September 4, 1979 after losing the support of a majority of MLAs. Jogendra Nath Hazarika was sworn in as chief minister on 9 November 1978. But he held the CM’s chair for only 94 days, as central government imposed President's rule in Assam.

== Background ==
The Navnirman Andolan, which erupted in December 1973 started on the issue of hike in fees for an engineering college in Gujarat, Jayaprakash Narayan's movement against corruption, a three week long Bihar rail strike led by socialist leader George Fernandes, had destabilized the political atmosphere of India. The sterilization program, which was tried to be implemented forcefully by Sanjay Gandhi, son of the then Prime Minister Indira Gandhi also created a lot of public outrage .

== Results ==
S. No	Party	Party-type	Contested	Won	Votes polled %	Vote % in seats contested
1	Communist Party of India	National	35	5	4.09	14.39
2	Communist Party of India (Marxist)	National	27	11	5.62	25.87
3	Indian National Congress	National	126	26	23.62	23.62
4	Indian National Congress	National	115	8	8.78	9.84
5	Janata Party	National	117	53	27.55	29.95
6	All India Forward Bloc	State	3	0	0.09	4.28
7	Plain Tribals Council of Assam	State	9	4	2.60	32.54
8	Revolutionary Socialist Party	State	6	0	0.44	8.85
9	All India Gorkha League	Registered	1	0	0.04	6.08
10	Revolutionary Communist Party of India	Registered	10	4	1.40	17.68
11	Socialist Unity Centre of India	Registered	4	0	0.07	2.29
12	Independent politician			15	25.67	26.50
Total				126		
Source: ECI

== Elected members ==
Constituency	Reserved for (SC/ST/None)	Member	Party
Ratabari	SC	Lilamoy Das	Janata Party
Patharkandi	None	Fakrul Islam	Independent
Karimganj North	None	Nishith Ranjan Das	Communist Party of India
Karimganj South	None	Abdul Muqtadir Choudhury	Indian National Congress
Badarpur	None	Ramendra De	Communist Party of India
Hailakandi	None	Dipak Bhattacharjee	Communist Party of India
Katlicherra	None	Gouri Sankar Roy	Indian National Congress
Algapur	None	Nepal Chandra Das	Indian National Congress
Silchar	None	Noorul Kuda	Communist Party of India
Sonai	None	Altaf Hossain Mazumdar	Janata Party
Dholai	SC	Sisir Ranjan Das	Indian National Congress
Udharbond	None	Jagannath Singh	Janata Party
Lakhipur	None	Kazi Kutub Uddin Ahmed	Independent
Barkhola	None	A.f.golam Osmani	Janata Party
Katigora	None	Abdul Kiyum Choudhury	Indian National Congress
Haflong	ST	Sona Ram Thaosen	Janata Party
Bokajan	ST	Bilton G.momin	Janata Party
Howraghat	ST	Barelong Terang	Janata Party
Diphu	ST	Gandhi Ram Timung	Janata Party
Baithalangso	ST	Dhani Ram Rongpi	Indian National Congress
Mankachar	None	Zahirul Islam	Janata Party
Salmara South	None	Dewan Joynal Abedin	Independent
Dhubri	None	Mohammad Umaruddin	Indian National Congress
Gauripur	None	Mohammad Azad Ali	Janata Party
Golakganj	None	Aluddin Sarkar	Communist Party of India
Bilasipara West	None	Gaisuddin Ahmed	Independent
Bilasipara East	None	Surat Chanddra Sinha	Indian National Congress
Gossaigaon	None	Mathias Tudu	Indian National Congress
Kokrajhar West	ST	Ranendra Narayan Basumatari	Indian National Congress
Kokrajhar East	ST	Samar Brahma Choudhury	Plain Tribals Council of Assam
Sidli	ST	Panchanan Brahma	Plain Tribals Council of Assam
Bongaigaon	None	Mathura Mohan Sinha	Janata Party
Bijni	None	Padmalochan Boro	Independent
Abhayapuri North	None	Pani Medhi	Independent
Abhayapuri South	SC	Rabindra Nath Choudhury	Janata Party
Dudhnai	ST	Jagat Chandra Patgiri	Janata Party
Goalpara East	None	Birendra Nath Choudhury	Communist Party of India
Goalpara West	None	Nazmul Haque	Independent
Jaleswar	None	Afzalur Rahman	Janata Party
Sorbhog	None	Hemen Das	Communist Party of India
Bhabanipur	None	Tarini Charan Das	Janata Party
Patacharkuchi	None	Bhubaneswar Barman	Janata Party
Barpeta	None	A. Latif	Independent
Jania	None	Abdus Sobhan	Indian National Congress
Baghbar	None	Ibrahim Ali	Indian National Congress
Sarukhetri	None	Sirajul Haque	Independent
Chenga	None	Danes Ali Ahmed	Indian National Congress
Boko	SC	Umesh Chandra Das	Janata Party
Chaygaon	None	A. N. Akram Hussain	Indian National Congress
Palasbari	None	Harendra Goswami	Janata Party
Jalukbari	None	Lakhyadhar Choudhury	Janata Party
Dispur	None	Tarini Mohan Barua	Janata Party
Gauhati East	None	Ajoy Kumar Dutta	Janata Party
Gauhati West	None	Kiran Chandra Bezbarua	Janata Party
Hajo	None	Rabindra Nath Malakar	Janata Party
Kamalpur	None	Daibasakti Deka	Janata Party
Rangiya	None	Purna Boro	Communist Party of India
Tamulpur	None	Padam Bahadur Chouhan	Janata Party
Nalbari	None	Narendra Nath Dutta	Communist Party of India
Barkhetry	None	Seikh Chand Mahammad	Janata Party
Dharmapur	None	Ramani Barman	Janata Party
Barama	ST	Baikuntha Nath Das	Indian National Congress
Chapaguri	ST	Manik Chandra Das	Independent
Panery	None	Ramesh Chandra Saharia	Independent
Kalaigaon	None	Nagen Sarma	Janata Party
Sipajhar	None	Madhab Rajbanshi	Janata Party
Mangaldoi	SC	Anil Das	Janata Party
Dalgaon	None	Syeda Anwara Taimur	Indian National Congress
Udalguri	ST	Binoy Kumar Basumatary	Plain Tribals Council of Assam
Majbat	None	Silvius Condpan	Janata Party
Dhekiajuli	None	Pratap Kalita	Indian National Congress
Barchalla	None	Kamal Chandra Basumatari	Plain Tribals Council of Assam
Tezpur	None	Jiban Bora	Janata Party
Rangapara	None	Golok Rajbanshi	Indian National Congress
Sootea	None	Golok Kakati	Janata Party
Biswanath	None	Kosheswar Bora	Janata Party
Behali	None	Bishnulal Upadhaya	Indian National Congress
Gohpur	None	Ram Chandra Sarmah	Janata Party
Jagiroad	SC	Prasad Chandra Doloi	Indian National Congress
Marigaon	None	Kaliram Dekta Raja	Indian National Congress
Laharighat	None	Abul Kashem	Indian National Congress
Raha	SC	Baliram Das	Janata Party
Dhing	None	Md. Samsul Huda	Revolutionary Communist Party of India
Batadroba	None	Baneswar Saikia	Revolutionary Communist Party of India
Rupohihat	None	Mohammad Idris	Indian National Congress
Nowgong	None	Mukut Sarma	Indian National Congress
Barhampur	None	Lakeshwar Gohain	Janata Party
Samaguri	None	Bhabendra Kumar Saikia	Janata Party
Kaliabor	None	Atil Chandra Goswami	Independent
Jamunamukh	None	Mujamil Ali Choudhury	Janata Party
Hojai	None	Santi Ranjan Das Gupta	Janata Party
Lumding	None	Biresh Misra	Communist Party of India
Bokakhat	None	Chatra Gopal Karmakar	Indian National Congress
Sarupathar	None	Aklius Tirkey	Indian National Congress
Golaghat	None	Soneswar Bora	Janata Party
Khumtai	None	Nogen Borua	Janata Party
Dergaon	SC	Ramesh Das	Janata Party
Jorhat	None	Dulal Chandra Baruah	Janata Party
Majuli	ST	Chakbhal Kagyang	Janata Party
Titabar	None	Giridhar Thengal	Communist Party of India
Mariani	None	Gajen Tanti	Indian National Congress
Teok	None	Devananda Boara	Janata Party
Amguri	None	Khagen Borbarua	Revolutionary Communist Party of India
Nazira	None	Hiteswar Saikia	Indian National Congress
Mahmara	None	Budha Barua	Revolutionary Communist Party of India
Sonari	None	Satya Tati	Indian National Congress
Thowra	None	Jogen Gogoi	Communist Party of India
Sibsagar	None	Promode Gogoi	Communist Party of India
Bihpuria	None	Premadhar Bora	Independent
Naoboicha	None	Afazuddin Ahmed	Independent
Lakhimpur	None	Sulo Bora	Communist Party of India
Dhakuakhana	ST	Lakhya Nath Doley	Indian National Congress
Dhemaji	ST	Purna Chandra Bora	Independent
Jonai	ST	Romesh Mohan Kouli	Janata Party
Moran	None	Joy Chandra Nagbanshi	Indian National Congress
Dibrugarh	None	Keshab Chandra Gogoi	Janata Party
Lahowal	None	Dipak Moormoo	Indian National Congress
Duliajan	None	Jogen Hazarika	Janata Party
Tingkhong	None	Bhadreswar Gogoi	Janata Party
Naharkatia	None	Sasha Kamal Handique	Communist Party of India
Chabua	None	Jnan Gogoi	Janata Party
Tinsukia	None	Golap Borborah	Janata Party
Digboi	None	Rameswar Dhanowar	Indian National Congress
Margherita	None	Kul Bahadur Chetri	Janata Party
Doom Dooma	None	Dileswar Tanti	Indian National Congress
Sadiya	None	Bipin Hazarika	Communist Party of India
