= Gogoi =

Gogoi are a division of seven Tai-Ahom clans and a surname used by the Tai-Ahom people in Assam. The word originates from the Ahom language word 'kukoy' which means Younger brother. King Sukhrungphaa divided the seven Tai-Ahom clans into Gogoi and Gohain to clarify Tai-Ahom descendancy.

== History ==
Chao Pha Sukhrungphaa divided the clans of the Satgharia Ahom ("Ahoms of the seven houses") aristocracy into two main divisions: "Gohain" and "Gogoi" to clarify clear descendancy. Any Non-gohain descendants of the Ahoms of the seven houses will have to use the title Gogoi and any other Ahom outside of the seven houses can't use the title Gogoi. The descendants of three Gohain clans i e. Borgohain, Burhagohain and Bor patra gohain can only use the title Gohain. In Ahom Kingdom, two Borphukans with the title of "Gogoi" from the Dihingia and Patar clan, served Swargadeo Gaurinath Singha and Swargadeo Chandrakanta Singha respectively, as one of the "Patra Mantris" (Council of five Ministers). This surname was granted by the Ahom King, to those who were very dear to the Ahom royal Family, indicating high officials to the Ahom kingdom

== Notable Gogoi ==
People with this surname include:

- Manoj Gogoi, Wildlife conservationist
- Pragyan Gogoi, Indian footballer
- Bismita Gogoi, politician
- Parthib Gogoi, Indian footballer
- Taranga Gogoi, politician
- Akhil Gogoi, Indian social activist.
- Dip Gogoi Indian politician
- Ganesh Gogoi, Indian poet
- Gaurav Gogoi, Indian politician
- Keshab Chandra Gogoi, Indian politician
- Lila Gogoi, writer, educationist and historian
- Manash Jyoti Gogoi (later known as Manas Robin), Indian singer, composer and lyricist.
- Mina Gogoi, Indian politician
- Pabitra Gogoi (later known as Pabitra Margherita), Indian politician, actor and singer.
- Pradip Gogoi, Indian politician
- Pranab Kumar Gogoi, Indian politician
- Probin Kumar Gogoi, Indian politician
- Promode Gogoi, Indian politician
- Jogen Gogoi, Indian politician
- Ranjan Gogoi, 46th Chief Justice of India
- Anjan Gogoi, Indian Air Marshal
- Shanti Gogoi, Indian social activist and writer
- Simple Gogoi, Indian filmmaker
- Tarun Gogoi, Indian politician
- Topon Kumar Gogoi, Indian politician
