= Devanand Konwar =

Indian politician (1934–2020)

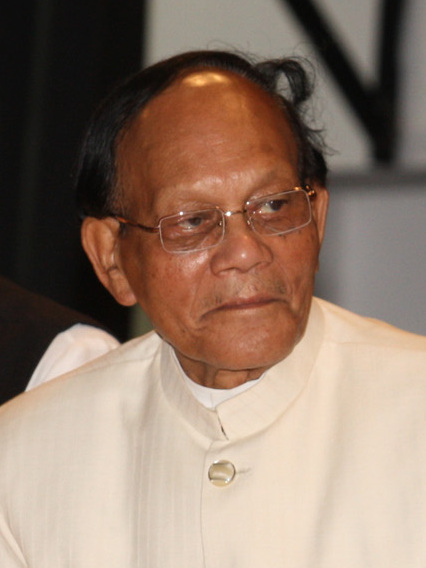
- Konwar in October 2012

Governor of Tripura
- In office 25 March 2013 – 29 June 2014
- Chief Minister: Manik Sarkar
- Preceded by: D. Y. Patil
- Succeeded by: Vakkom Purushothaman

Governor of Bihar
- In office 29 June 2009 – 21 March 2013
- Chief Minister: Nitish Kumar
- Preceded by: R. L. Bhatia
- Succeeded by: D. Y. Patil

Governor of West Bengal (Additional charge)
- In office 14 December 2009 – 23 January 2010
- Chief Minister: Buddhadeb Bhattacharjee
- Preceded by: Gopalkrishna Gandhi
- Succeeded by: M. K. Narayanan
Ministerial offices
Minister of Power
In office 17 May 2001 – July 2004
Chief Minister	Tarun Gogoi
Preceded by	Prafulla Kumar Mahanta
Succeeded by	Tarun Gogoi
Minister of Finance and Revenue
In office 17 May 2001 – 7 June 2002
Chief Minister	Tarun Gogoi
Preceded by	Prafulla Kumar Mahanta
Succeeded by	Tarun Gogoi (Finance); Mithius Tudu (Revenue)
Minister of Law and Municipal Administration
In office 30 June 1991 – 14 May 1996
Chief Minister	Hiteswar Saikia; Bhumidhar Barman
Preceded by	Surendra Nath Medhi
Succeeded by	Prafulla Kumar Mahanta
Assembly offices
Member of Assam Legislative Assembly
In office 1991–2006
Preceded by	Barki Prasad Telengana
Succeeded by	Kushal Dowari
Constituency	Thowra
In office 1983 – 1985
Preceded by	Nagen Barua
Succeeded by	Prodip Gogoi
Constituency	Sibsagar

Personal details
- Born: 18 November 1937 Tinsukia, Assam Province, British India
- Died: 25 April 2020 (aged 82) Guwahati, India
- Party: Indian National Congress (1955–2015); All India United Democratic Front
- Spouse: Neeva Konwar
- Children: 3
- Education: University of Delhi; Gauhati University
- Occupation: Politician; lawyer; lecturer
- Website: Official Website

Devanand Konwar (18 November 1937 – 25 April 2020) was an Indian statesman, lawyer, and educationist who served as the governor of Bihar from 2009 to 2013 and as the governor of Tripura from 2013 to 2014. A member of the Indian National Congress, (Note: Konwar was a member of the Indian National Congress from 1955 to 2015, but later defected to the AIUDF.) he held the additional charge of governor of West Bengal from December 2009 to January 2010. Konwar served in various ministerial positions in the Assam state government from 1991 to 1996 and from 2001 to 2004, most notably as finance minister under Tarun Gogoi from 2001 to 2002. He was the Member of Assam Legislative Assembly (MLA) for Sibsagar from 1983 to 1985 and for Thowra from 1991 to 2006.

Born in Tinsukia, Konwar passed the matriculation exam from Khowang High School and later received a Bachelor of Arts (BA) from Cotton College. He then studied for a Master of Arts (MA) from Delhi University and then a Bachelor of Laws (LLB) from Gauhati university. Konwar began his career as an English lecturer at Cotton College and went on to work for the American firm Standard Vacuum Oil Company in Mumbai. He established Guwahati College, and served as its founder principal from 1968 to 1969. Konwar joined the Gauhati High Court Bar in November 1969 and practiced there and at the Supreme Court of India as an advocate until 1991. He served as the government advocate for the states of Assam, Tripura, Arunachal Pradesh and Mizoram. Konwar joined the Indian National Congress as a student leader in 1955, and coordinated the election campaign for the 1978 election. Between 1982 and 1990, he held various positions within the party and the Assam Pradesh Congress Committee, including as general secretary and vice president of the latter organisation.

Konwar was elected to the Assam Legislative Assembly as the Congress candidate for the Sibsagar constituency in the 1983 Assam election. He left office at the subsequent election held two years later, but remained active in party politics. Konwar wished to contest the 1991 Lok Sabha elections, but the party was unable to accommodate him, and he instead ran for the Thowra constituency in the 1991 Assam election. After his successful election, Konwar was appointed to the cabinet under Chief Minister Hiteswar Saikia as the Law Minister. Following the death of Saikia in 1996, he was reappointed under Bhumidhar Barman, but left office after Congress was defeated in the election held the same year and entered opposition. After Congress returned to power following the 2001 election, Konwar returned to the cabinet as the Finance, Revenue, and Power minister under Chief Minister Tarun Gogoi. He was removed from his finance and revenue portfolios in 2002 but retained his position as power minister. Gogoi dismissed Konwar from the cabinet for alleged dissident activities against him in 2004. Konwar was speculated by the media as a potential successor to Gogoi, but went on to lose his seat to the Bharatiya Janata Party (BJP) at the 2006 election.

After leaving office, Konwar continued in party politics before, in June 2009 he was appointed the governor of Bihar. In December of the same year, he was given the additional charge of West Bengal, holding the position until January 2010. As Bihar governor, in 2011, his office began to clash with the state government over Konwar's refusal to give assent to several higher education bills, which caused a decline in the relationship between Konwar and Chief Minister Nitish Kumar. The following year in 2012, Konwar controversially appointed six vice-chancellors and pro-vice chancellors, which the state government alleged was without consultation. The Patna High Court cancelled the appointments, a decision which the Supreme Court later stayed. Konwar continued to allegedly appoint vice-chancellors without the state government's permission, further deteriorating relations with Kumar. After an expenses controversy and opposition protests during his 2013 budget speech, Konwar was transferred to become Tripura governor, serving until his retirement in 2014. He wished to return to Assam state politics, but amid political disagreements with Gogoi, he defected to the AIUDF. Konwar died in 2020 at his residence in Guwahati and was cremated with full state honours.

== Early life, ancestry, and education ==
Devanand Konwar was born on 18 November 1937 at the Rajah Ali tea estate in Tinsukia, to Padma Kanta Konwar and Kusum Kumari Konwar. His father worked at the Rajah Ali tea estate when he was born. He was the eldest of three brothers and six sisters.

Konwar completed his primary education at Nitaipukhuri. Konwar studied in Khowang as his father worked at the Khowang tea estate; he passed the matriculation exam from Khowang High School in the 1st division. He obtained a Bachelor of Arts (BA) from Cotton College and a Master of Arts (MA) from Delhi University in English. Konwar then studied for a Bachelor of Laws (LLB) from Gauhati university.

== Career ==
=== Early roles ===
Konwar began his career as a lecturer in the English Department of Cotton College in Guwahati. In 1961, he went to work for the American firm Standard Vacuum Oil Company in Mumbai as a marketing manager and remained in that position for seven years. He coordinated petroleum products distribution networks in Northern and Eastern India from Trombay, Vizag, Barauni, Noonmati, Digboi Refineries and Budge-Budge sea Terminal and another company, Inland Product Terminals.

Konwar established a Degree College in Guwahati City known as Guwahati College, and was its founder Principal from 1968 to 1969.

=== Legal career ===
In November 1969, Konwar joined Gauhati High Court Bar and practiced there as well as in the Supreme Court of India as an Advocate until 1991. He professionally served as Government Advocate for the States of Assam, Tripura, Arunachal Pradesh and Mizoram in the Gauhati High Court.

== Political career ==
=== Early involvement and positions ===
He joined the Indian National Congress party in 1955 as a student leader. When the Congress party split in two, he aligned himself with the Congress (I) faction. In 1978, instead of contesting as a candidate, Konwar was tasked with coordinating the election campaign for the Congress party.

Between 1982 and 1990, Konwar held various party positions at both the state and district level. He served including as the general secretary of the Assam Pradesh Congress Committee for two years from 1982 to 1984 and then as the vice president for six years from 1984 to 1990.

=== Sibsagar MLA (1983–1985) ===
In the 1983 Assam legislative assembly election, Konwar stood as the Congress candidate for the Sibsagar constituency. He was elected with 700 votes, which was 67.7% of the total vote. He obtained a majority of 490 votes, defeating communist candidate Promode Gogoi.

At the 1985 Assam legislative assembly election, Konwar was not reselected as the Congress candidate for the Sibsagar constituency, which instead went to Troilukyada Gogoi.

=== Later activities (1985–1991) ===
In 1989, Konwar was chosen to lead a 28-member FSU (Friends of the Soviet Union) delegation composed of participants from Assam, Andhra Pradesh and Tamil Nadu to Moscow, Kyiv, Almaty, Tashkent, Sochi, Leningrad and other areas in the Soviet Republics.

Konwar was keen to contest the 1991 Lok Sabha elections, but the party was unable to accommodate his candidacy.

=== Thowra MLA ===
==== First term (1991–1996) ====
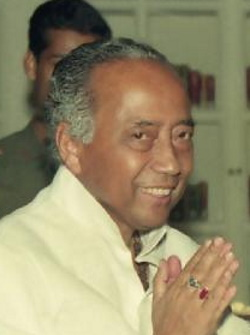
Hiteswar Saikia (pictured) appointed Konwar to Cabinet.

In the 1991 Assam legislative assembly election, Konwar stood for the Thowra constituency. He was elected for the constituency with 18,569 votes, obtaining 38.55% of the total vote. Konwar won a majority of 7347 votes, defeating the nearest competitor who was an Asom Gana Parishad candidate.

In the Second Saikia ministry, Konwar was appointed the Cabinet minister for Law, Power Revenue, and Municipal Administration under Chief Minister Hiteswar Saikia. After the death of Saikia, he was reappointed the ministerial position under Chief Minister Bhumidhar Barman. He held office until 1996.

==== Second term (1996–2001) ====
At the 1996 Assam legislative assembly election, Konwar was reelected with 15439 votes. He received 29.42% of the total vote. He defeated his nearest opponent by 4135 votes. Congress was defeated overall in the election, and Konwar went to opposition.

==== Third term (2001–2006) ====
===== Ministerial career =====
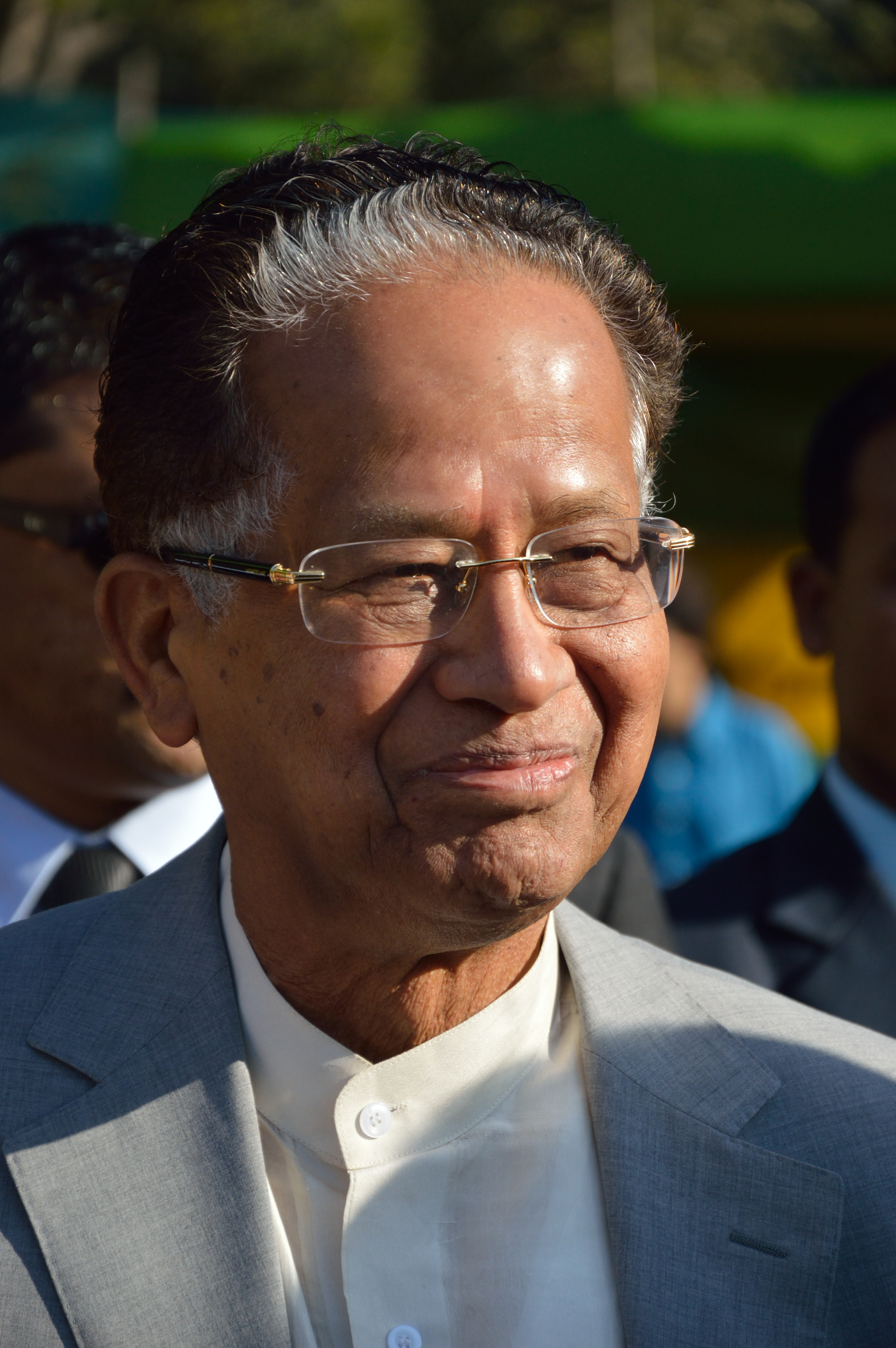
Konwar was dismissed from Cabinet by Tarun Gogoi (pictured) and speculated by the media as a potential successor to him.

At the 2001 Assam legislative assembly election, Konwar obtained 24976 votes and was reelected. He won 43.91% of the total vote, and obtained a majority of 12256 votes.

In the first Tarun Gogoi ministry, he served as the Minister of Finance and Revenue, as well as Minister for Power. He was removed from his portfolios of finance and revenue in June 2002. In the July 2004, following the 91st amendment to the constitution of India which mandated states to downsize the amount of cabinet ministers in the state government, Konwar was dismissed from cabinet. The Indian Express later reported that this was due to his alleged dissident activities against Gogoi.

===== Final assembly years =====
In April 2006, amid concerns over the political leadership of Gogoi, Konwar was speculated as a potential Congress candidate for Chief Minister to succeed Gogoi and lead the party in the 2006 election.

In 2004, Konwar was appointed the Assam Pradesh Congress Committee observer in the Assembly elections in the northeastern states of Tripura, Manipur, Nagaland, Meghalaya, and Mizoram, and in 2005 for Odisha.

Konwar was defeated at the 2006 Assam Legislative Assembly election, losing his seat to Bharatiya Janata Party (BJP) candidate Kushal Dowari.

== Later career (2006–2009) ==
In the 2009 elections, he was the Assam Pradesh Congress Committee Observer for Arunachal Pradesh. In the elections, Congress regained seats from the BJP.

== Gubernatorial career ==
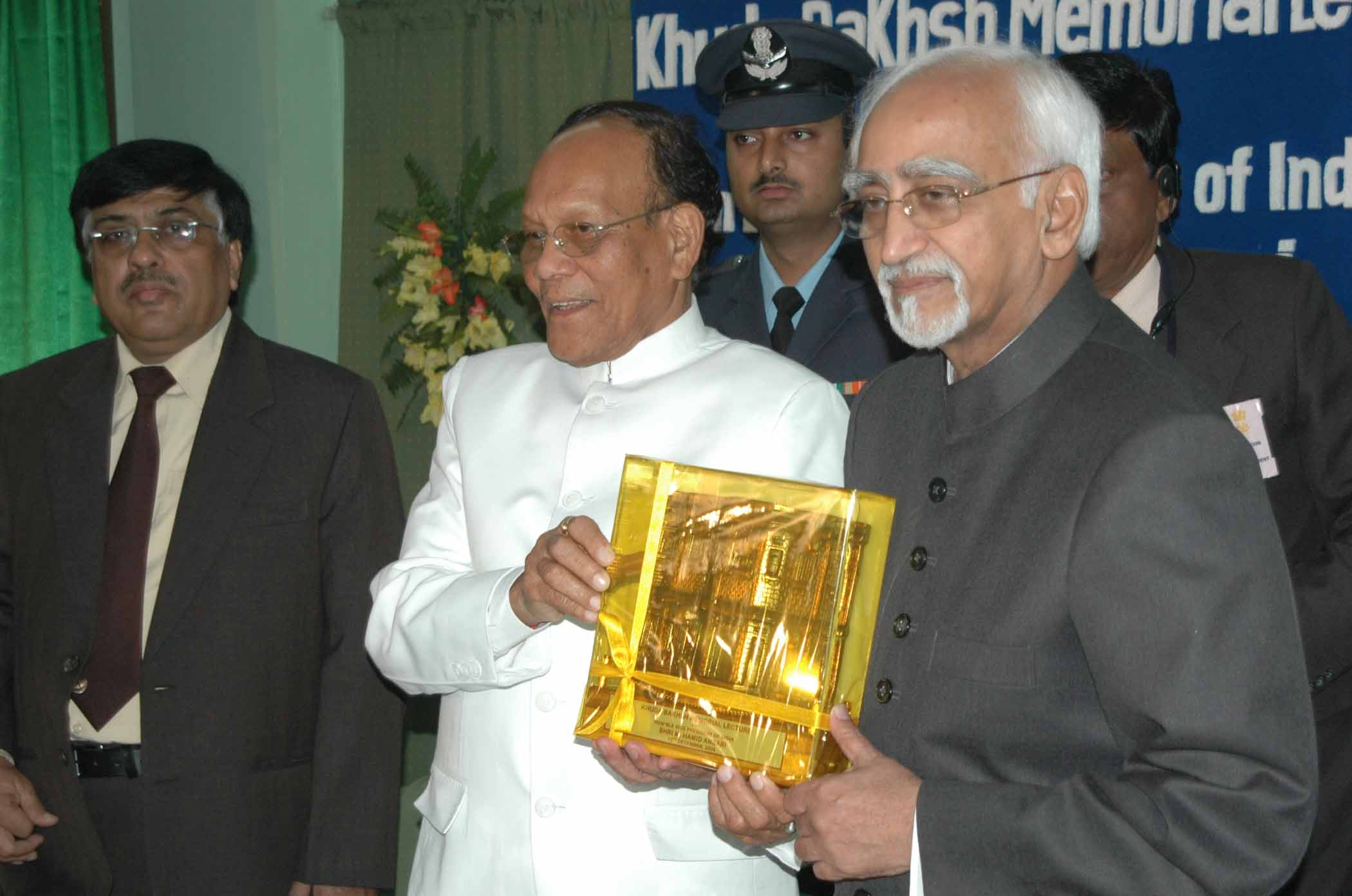
Konwar with vice president Mohammad Hamid Ansari in December 2009.

=== Bihar (2009–2013) ===
==== Appointment and tenure ====
On 24 June 2009, Konwar was appointed governor of Bihar, succeeding the outgoing R.L. Bhatia. On 29 June, Konwar was sworn in as governor in a ceremony at Raj Bhavan, Patna. Acting Chief Justice Shiva Kirti Singh administered the oath of office and secrecy to Konwar. Dignitaries present at the ceremony included Chief Minister Nitish Kumar, Speaker Uday Narayan Choudhary, acting Legislative Council chairman Arun Kumar, Deputy Chief Minister Sushil Kumar Modi, numerous ministers, and bureaucrats. Additionally, the family of Konwar and other friends from Assam, as well as senior Congress leaders, attended the ceremony. Chief Minister Nitish Kumar wished success for Konwar with the appointment, and stated that the "governor is now a Bihari and he will certainly be of great help in maintaining cordial relations between the two states".

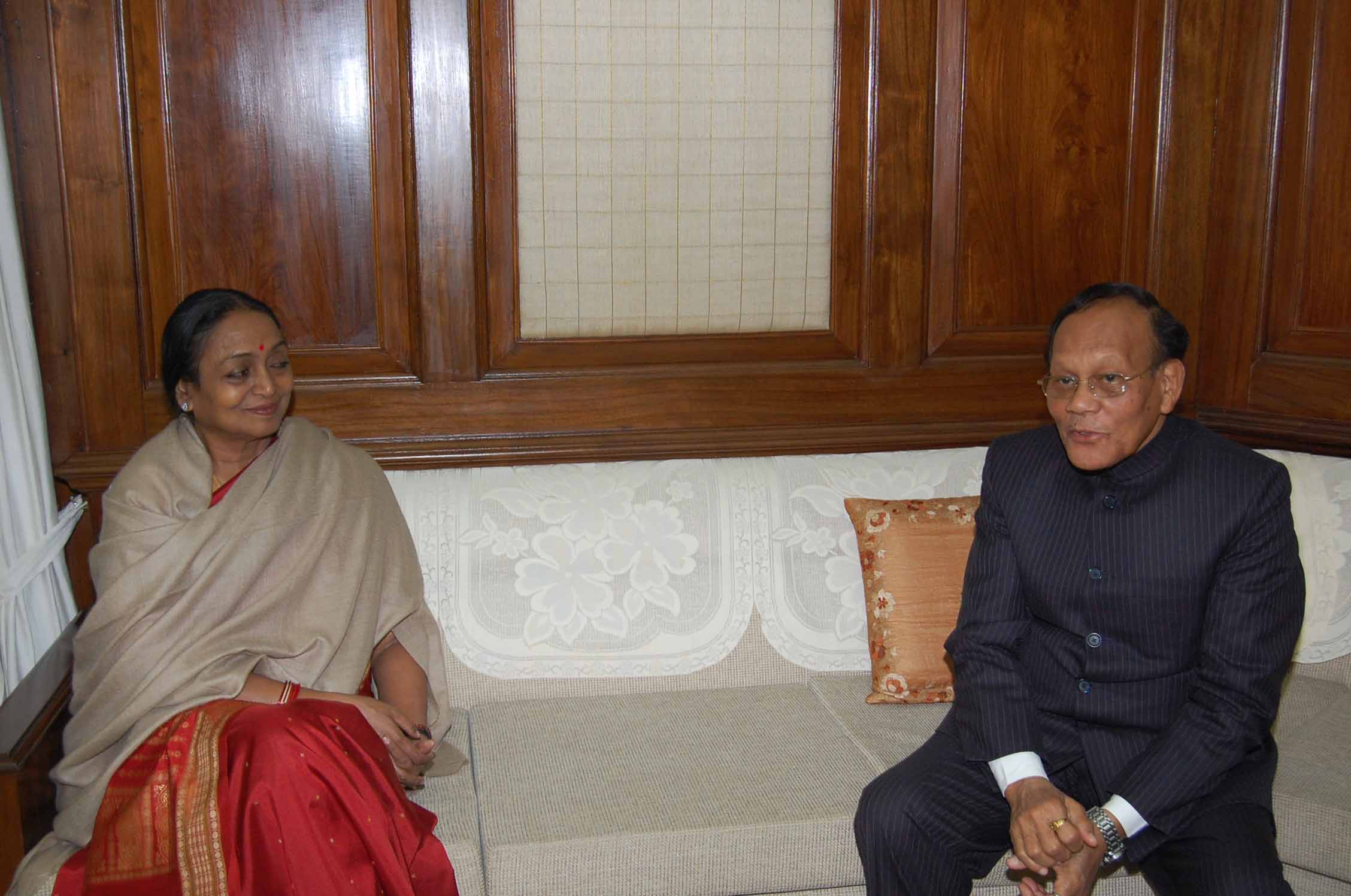
Konwar with Lok Sabha Speaker Meira Kumar in December 2009.

In January 2013, Konwar argued that India had a tendency to focus on quantity over quality, and advocated for course correction to help address the issue. In his address to students at a university, Konwar underpinned the importance of standards in governance, and cited China as an example of the course correction he supported.

In his 2013 joint session of the Bihar assembly budget speech, Konwar stated that his government was committed to development and justice, and would soon become a developed state. Also in his speech, Konwar stressed the implementation of the 2009 Bihar Special Court Act and also effective control of criminals with the Crime and Criminal Tracking Networking system scheme. Konwar listed the achievements of his government in the speech, including in areas such as education, healthcare, and urban development. Konwar also claimed that the decline in crime in the state had been as a result of various crime control measures.

==== Legislative affairs ====
In May 2011, after returning from a month-long tour, Konwar gave his gubernatorial assent to seven bills which had been passed in the budget session in March 2011. The seven bills he passed were the Bihar Valued Added Tax Amendment bill, Bihar Non-government Secondary School Amendment and Control bill, Bihar School Examination Board Amendment bill, Bihar Panchayati Raj Amendment bill, Bihar Municipal Act Amendment bill, Bihar Professional Tax bill, and the Bihar Integrated Check Post Authority bill.

In the same year, Konwar declined to give his assent on three education-related bills: the Bihar University Tribunal Bill, the Bihar University Service Commission Bill 2011, and the Bihar State School Teachers and Employees Dispute Redressal Tribunal 2011. The disputes over the higher education bills led to rift between Konwar and Chief Minister Kumar.

Also in 2011, Konwar gave his assent to the Bihar Lokayukta Act. The legislation brought both current and former Chief Ministers of Bihar under direct purview of anti-corruption investigations.

==== Vice-chancellor appointments and dismissals ====
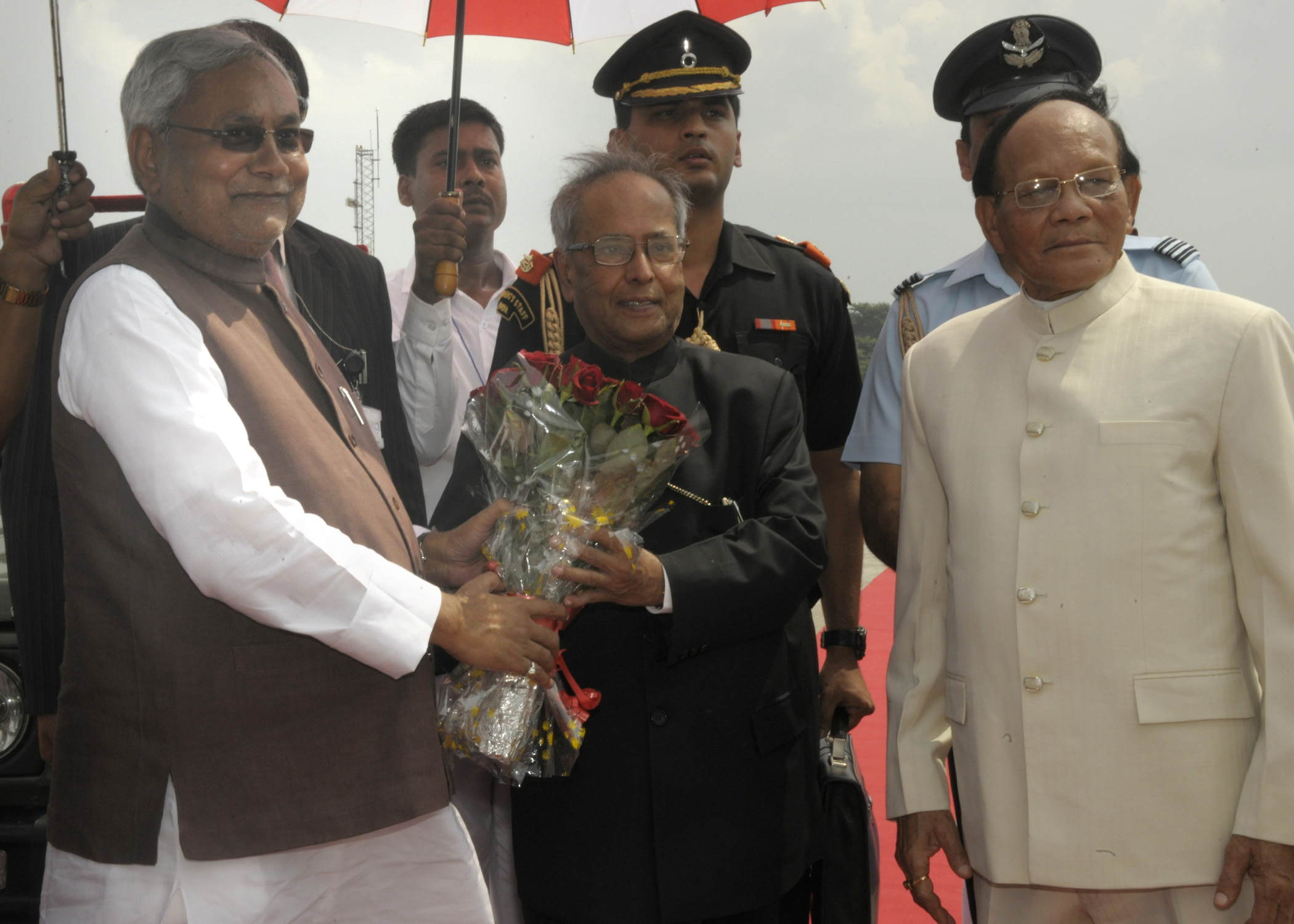
Konwar with president Pranab Mukherjee and Chief Minister Nitish Kumar in October 2012.

As governor, Konwar acted as the ex-officio chancellor of the state universities in that region. In January 2012, he asked the Tilka Manjhi Bhagalpur University vice-chancellor to leave his position in the next two days or it would be deemed vacant.

In 2012, Konwar became involved in controversy over his decision to appoint six vice-chancellors and pro-vice chancellors in the year 2011–12. Konwar issued the notification of the appointment of the officials in 2011, and it claimed that the appointments had been made on consultation with the state government. The state government went on to repeatedly deny that the appointments had been made in consultation with them, and alleged that the appointments had violated the Bihar State Universities Act, 1976 which made it mandatory for the Chancellor to consult the state government over the appointments.

A report by the account general concluded that "no consultation was ever held between His Excellency the Governor of Bihar and Hon'ble Chief Minister over the appointment of Vice Chancellor/ Pro-Vice Chancellor during 2011-12. Hence the appointment of Pro-Vice Chancellors of four different universities made by His Excellency, the Governor of Bihar in August 2011, without consultation with State Government was irregular." The report stated that no evidence of consultation was shown to the audit despite requests from the office of the account general. It also specified particular appointments of persons who did not fulfil the eligibility criteria to become the vice-chancellors.

On 7 December 2012, the Patna High Court cancelled the appointment of six vice chancellors and four pro-vice chancellors of seven universities that Konwar had made over alleged illegalities in their appointments. A division bench of Chief Justice Rekha M. Doshit and Justice A. Amanullah scrapped the appointments, writing in their judgement that the "Chancellor should obtain the opinion of the state government before he appoints vice-chancellors and pro vice-chancellors selected by him. The opinion of the State Government may or may not be accepted by the Chancellor". However, the verdict also noted that the chancellor had "supreme authority" and that his decision should prevail.

In February 2013, the controversy continued after Konwar appointed eight vice-chancellors, six of whom had previously been rejected by the High Court ruling. This further deteriorated relations with the Chief Minister. Chief Minister Kumar went public with his disagreements, stating that "there was no consultation as per the High Court order on the recent appointment of the Vice-Chancellors by the Governor-cum-Chancellor". He went on to say that it was a "very sad state of affairs" where " nothing is in our hands", and "everything is done in such an arbitrary manner by the Chancellor". Konwar defended himself, stating that the government suggestion was not binding on him per the government orders.

Also in February 2013, Konwar faced taunts from opposition members in the assembly while delivering his budget address over the controversy. A Supreme Court bench consisting of Justices G. S. Singhvi and Kurian Joseph and criticised the conduct of Konwar the following month.

==== Expenses controversy ====
Following the audit of the account general, Konwar became involved in an expenses controversy. The report concluded that Konwar should have pay a total of Rs 1.48 crore back to the state, as he had allegedly extended his stay on various trips wintout authorisation. The report noted that Konwar had been on tour for 79 days from 2009 to 2010, 73 days for 2010-11 and 154 days for 2011–12. The reported also mentioned a "doubtful payment" of Rs 2.05 lakh against the alleged irregular purchase of two iPhones, an Apple iPad and Macbook.

After Konwar was moved to become governor of Tripuna, deputy chief minister Sushil Modi labelled him "the most corrupt governor" in the state's history and also demanded an impartial inquiry into his tenure as governor.

=== West Bengal (2009–2010) ===
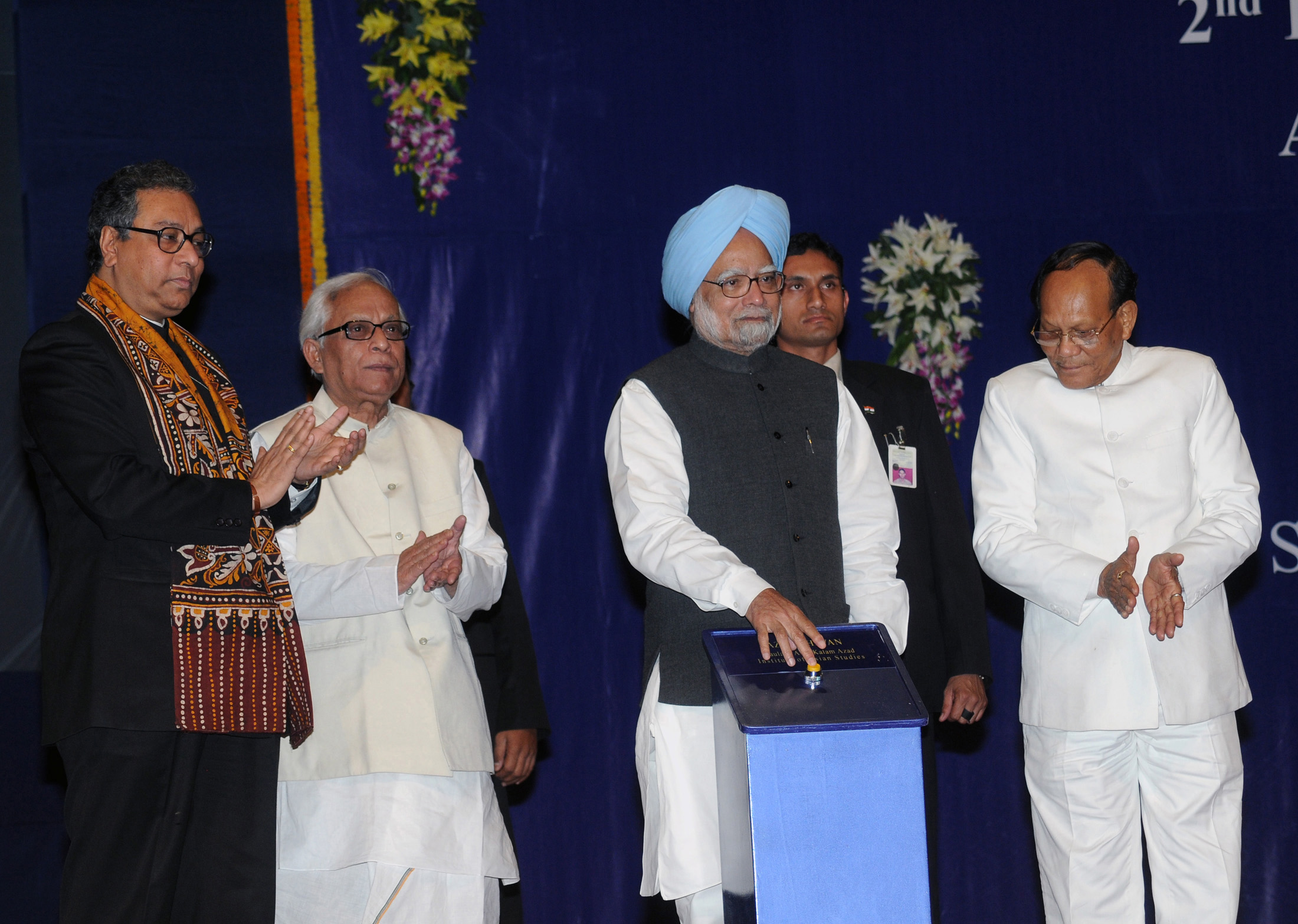
Konwar (right) with Prime Minister Manmohan Singh and Chief Minister Bhattacharjee in 2010.

Konwar was appointed the governor of West Bengal in December 2009 as an additional charge. He was sworn in on 14 December in a ceremony attended by Chief Minister Buddhadeb Bhattacharjee, Speaker Hasim Abdul Halim, Leader of the Opposition Partha Chatterjee, justce Bhaskar Bhattacharrya, and many other dignitaries.

In January 2010, Konwar accompanied Prime Minister Manmohan Singh and Chief Minister Bhattacharjee to lay the foundation of the second phase of the science city at the Maulana Abul Kalam Azad Institute of Asian Studies.

=== Tripura (2013–2014) ===
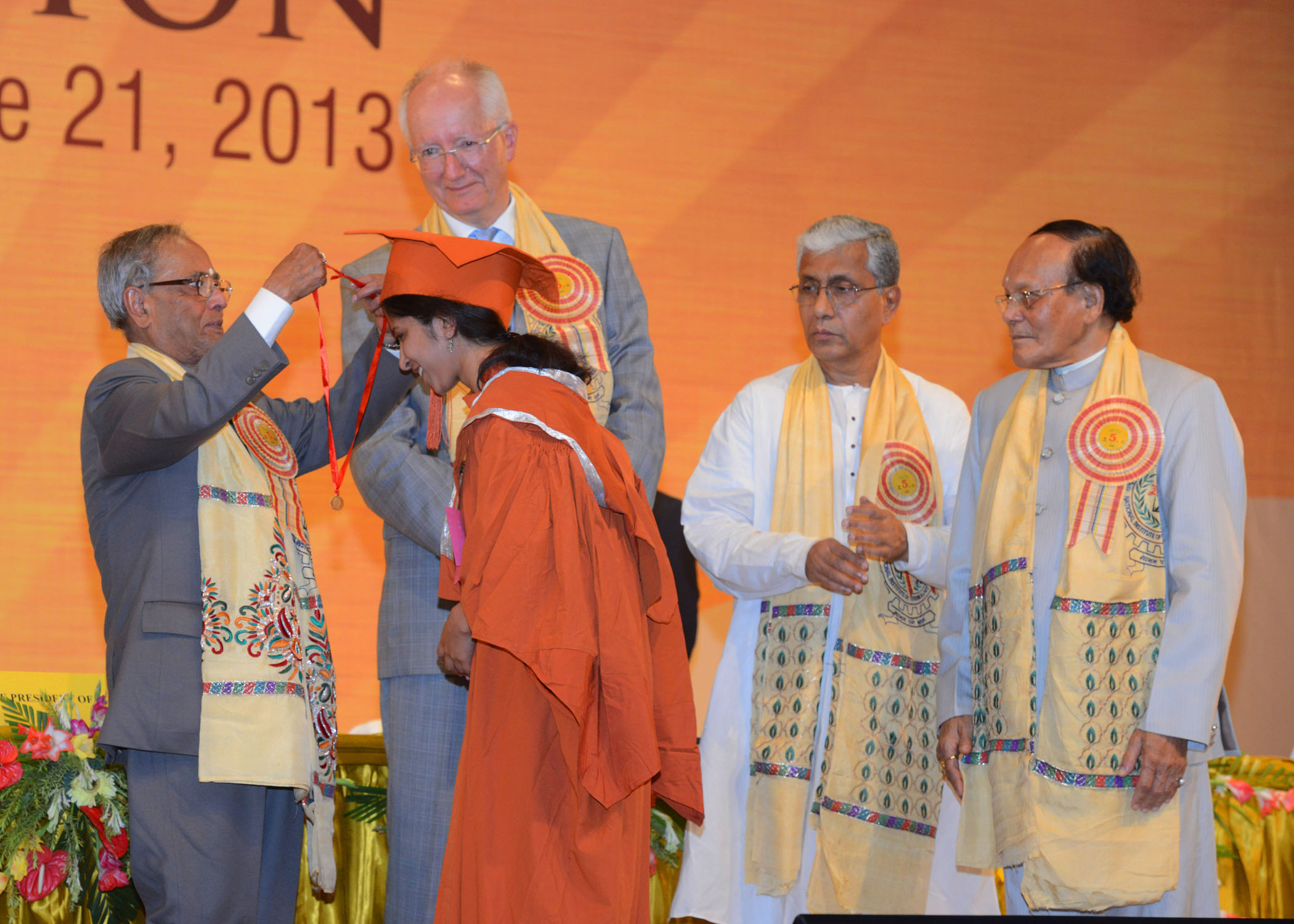
Konwar (right) with president Pranab Mukherjee and Chief Minister Manik Sarkar (second from right) in June 2013.

Amid the vice-chancellor appointment controversy, president Pranab Mukherjee appointed Konwar the governor of Tripura. On 25 March 2013, Konwar took the oath of office as the 13th governor of Tripura, succeeding D.Y. Patil who replaced him as governor of Bihar. He became the first person from Northeast India to hold the office. Chief Justice Deepak Gupta administered him the oath of office and secrecy to Konwar. The ceremony was attended by many dignitaries including Chief Minister Manik Sarkar, cabinet ministers, senior army, civil and other officials. After taking the oath of office, Konwar told reporters "I shall do my best for the all round development and welfare of Tripura and its people. I will push the developmental schemes put forward by the state government to the centre".

On the 65th republic day in 2014, Konwar declared that the state had set an example of "good governance" and raised a "high moral of democracy". He also asserted that "extremist activities" in the state had been contained, and also that the "law and order" situation had improved.

Konwar retired on 29 June 2014 and was succeeded by Vakkom Purushothaman.

== Post-government political life (2014–2020) ==
=== AIUDF defection ===
Despite his wish to return to Assam state politics after his governorship had ended, Chief Minister Tarun Gogoi and Assam Pradesh Congress Committee president Anjan Dutta declined to let Konwar stand as a Congress candidate in the 2016 legislative election. Subsequently, in September 2015, Konwar announced his intention to join All India United Democratic Front (AIUDF). Amid speculation about his potential defection, he stated "I think the Congress party does not want me. So I have decided to join the party which has the biggest mass base."

On 20 January 2016, Konwar formally defected to the AIUDF in the presence of president Badruddin Ajmal at Bohori in Barpeta. He argued in his speech, where he spoke in Bengalu, that the party was "more secular" than Congress.

Konwar eventually became vice president of the party, but later on left the party.

== Personal life ==
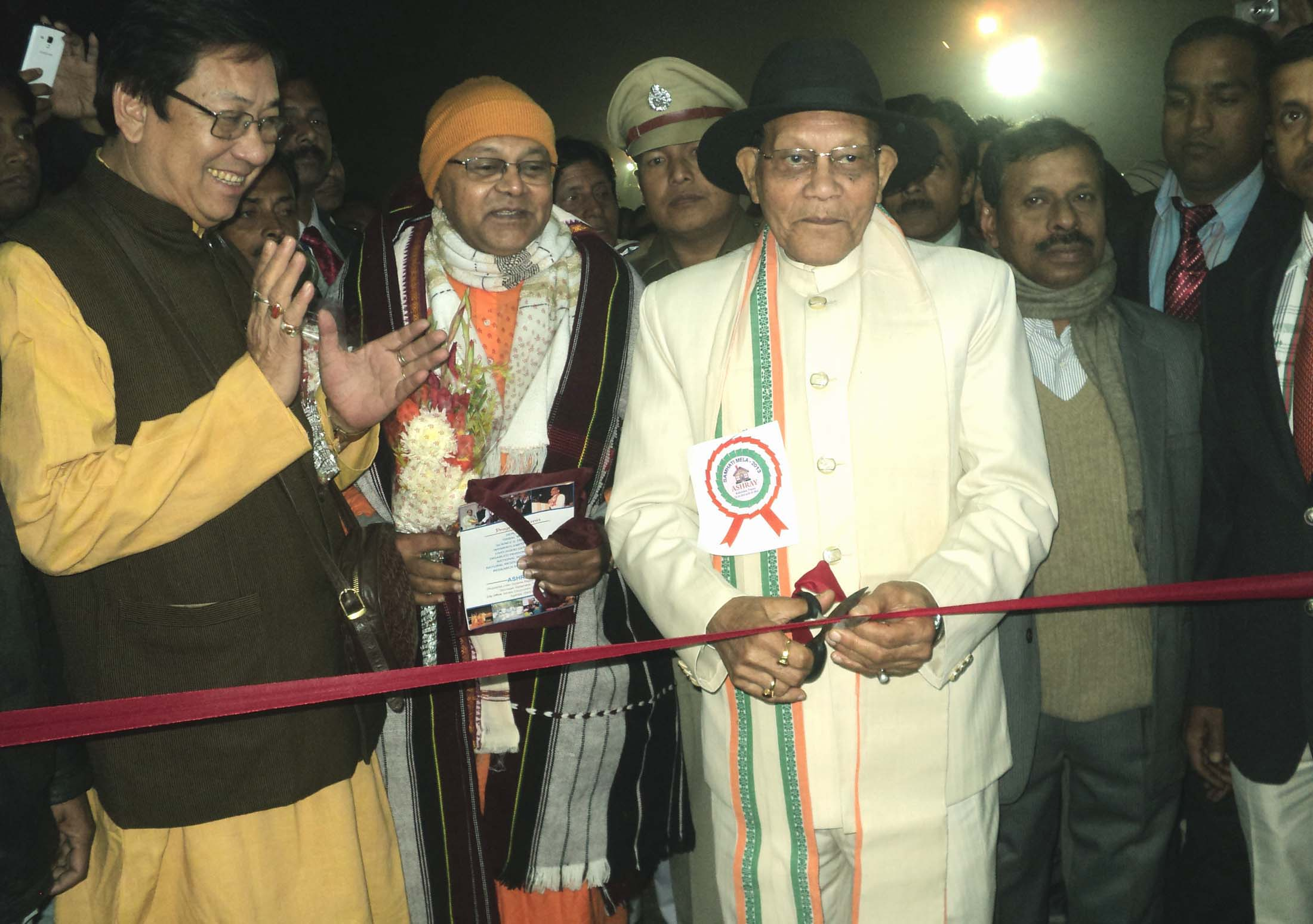
Konwar in 2013.

Konwar was married to Neeva Konwar and had two daughters and a son. Neeva Konwar was a member of the National Commission for Women until her resignation in 2010. Their daughter, Nandita, became a civil servant, and was later arrested for allegedly taking a bribe.

== Death and funeral ==
=== Death and tributes ===
After suffering from a prolonged illness, Konwar died on 25 April 2020 at his residence in the Rukminigaon area of Guwahati at around 2.30 AM. He was survived by his wife and childen.

Assam Governor Jagdish Mukhi, Chief Minister Sarbananda Sonowal, state Congress president Ripun Bora, Tarun Gogoi, state BJP president Ranjeet Kumar Dass, and AIUDF president Badruddin Ajmal all paid tribute to Konwar. Mukhi said "he made an indelible mark to glorify the spirit of parliamentary democracy, yet strengthening the edifice of democratic federalism". Gogoi described him as an "able politician, eminent lawyer" as well as "noted social worker" who always worked for the "welfare of the poor".

=== Funeral ===
Konwar's mortal remains were taken to his ancestral home village in Nitaipukhuri Konwar gaon in the district of Sibsagar. On 25 April, his body was cremated with full state honours in Sibsagar. His son, Palash, perform his last rites, and Minister Jogen Mohan offered floral tributes on behalf of the Chief Minister. Other notable figures in attendance included MP Topon Kumar Gogoi, MLA Kamakhya Prasad Tasa, former MLA Sushanta Borgohain, Thowra MLA Kushal Dowari and various other dignitaries.

== Assessment and legacy ==
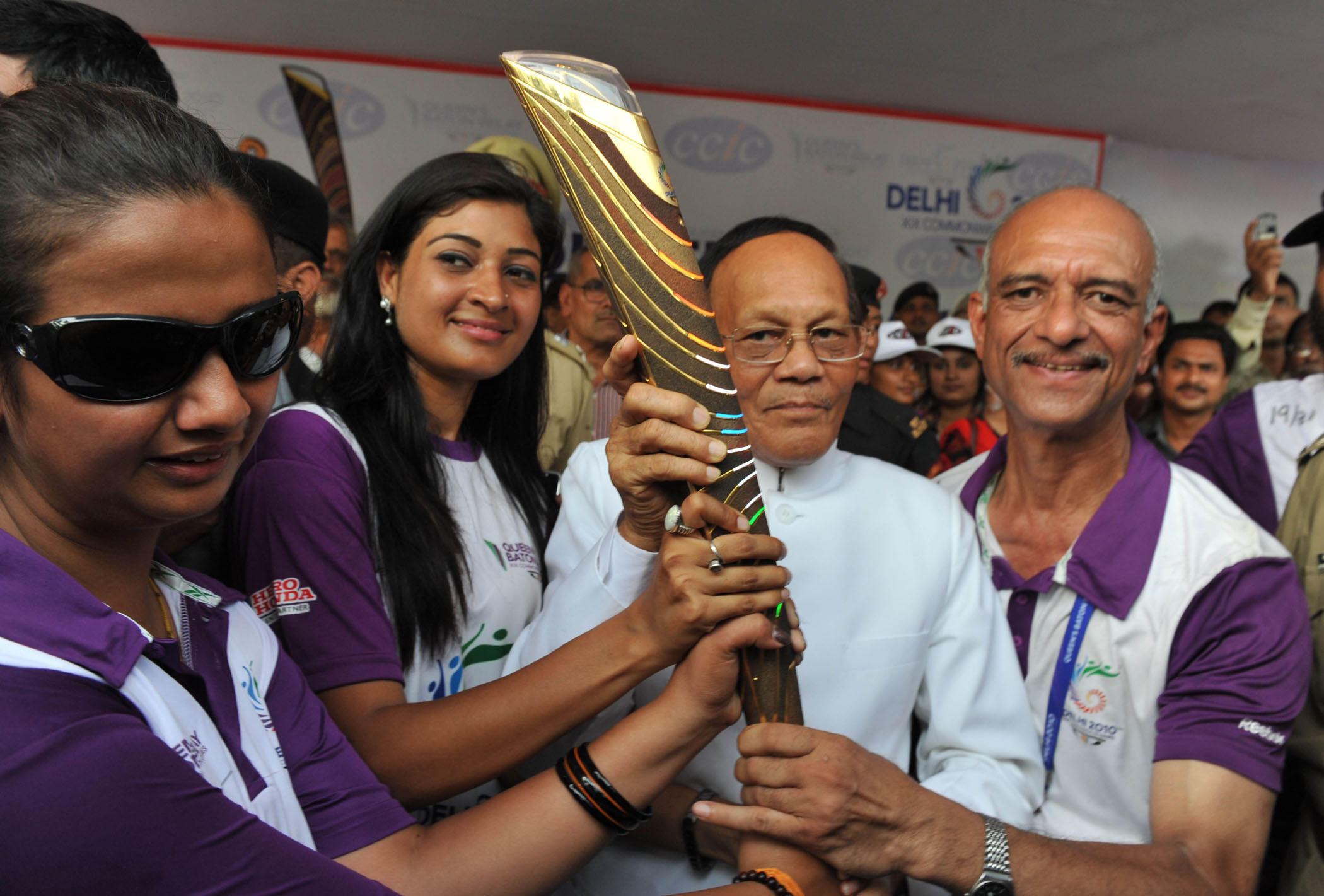
Konwar with Kamal Chaudhry and Alka Lamba in July 2010.

In 2015, the Indian Express reported that Konwar "had always considered himself to be a Chief Ministerial candidate". In 2016, The Telegraph reported that a congressman had described Konwar as a "known face in Upper Assam "and was "known for speaking his mind". Jagdish Mukhi asserted that he was a dedicated leader and worker who served the people of the state with "deep commitment, compassion and love for them".

== See also ==
- Mahendra Mohan Choudhry
- Ramen Deka
