= People's Freedom Party =

People's Freedom Party may mean one of the following:

- People's Freedom Party (Russia)
- People's Freedom Party "For Russia without Lawlessness and Corruption"
- Constitutional Democratic Party, also called the People's Freedom Party
- Constitutional Democratic Party – Party of Popular Freedom, a 1990s Russian political party named after the original Constitutional Democratic Party
- People's Freedom Party (Nepal)
- Gana Mukti Sangram Asom (India) (lit. 'People's Freedom Struggle Assam'), political party in Assam, India

== See also ==
- People's Freedom Movement (disambiguation)
- People's Liberation Party (disambiguation)
