= People's Liberation Party =

People's Liberation Party may refer to:

- People's Liberation Party (Kenya), a political party in Kenya.
- People's Liberation Party (Turkey), a Marxist–Leninist communist party in Turkey
- People's Liberation Party (Timor-Leste), a political party in Timor-Leste (former East Timor)
- People's Liberation Party-Front of Turkey, a former Marxist–Leninist guerrilla group in Turkey
- People's Liberation Party-Front of Turkey/Revolutionary Coordination Union, a former Marxist–Leninist organization in Turkey
- Gana Mukti Sangram Asom (India) (lit. 'People's Liberation Struggle Assam'), political party in Assam, India

== See also ==
- People's Freedom Movement (disambiguation)
- People's Freedom Party (disambiguation)
