= Girindra Nath Gogoi =

Indian politician

Minister of State, Public Works Department
- In office 28 December 1957 - 1962
- Chief Minister: Bimala Prasad Chaliha

Deputy Minister, Government of Assam
- In office 1952 - 1957
- Chief Minister: Bishnu Ram Medhi

Member of Assam Legislative Assembly
- In office 1951 - 1967
- Preceded by: constituency established
- Succeeded by: Promode Gogoi
- Constituency: Sibsagar

Personal details
- Political party: Indian National Congress
- Spouse: Hiranyalata Gogoi
- Children: Pranab Kumar Gogoi Pratima Gohain Prabin Kumar Gogoi
- Occupation: Politician

Girindra Nath Gogoi was a former Member of Assam Legislative Assembly and Minister of State for Public Works Department (PWD). He was the father of former Speaker and Minister Pranab Kumar Gogoi.

== Political career ==
In the 1952 Assam Legislative Assembly election, Gogoi was the Indian National Congress candidate for the constituency of Sibsagar. He received 11613 votes and became the MLA of the constituency. He was made a deputy minister in Bishnu Ram Medhi’s cabinet.

In the 1957 Assam Legislative Assembly election, Gogoi received 11638 votes and was reelected as the Indian National Congress candidate for Sibsagar.

In the 1962 Assam Legislative Assembly election, he received 12282 votes and was reelected. He became a Minister of State for the PWD.

In the 1967 Assam Legislative Assembly Election, Gogoi received 9735 votes, losing to Communist Party candidate Promode Gogoi.

== Personal life ==
Gogoi was married to the late Hiranyalata Gogoi. They had a son, Pranab Kumar Gogoi (19 August 1936 – 3 February 2020) who also became MLA for Sibsagar and became a minister and Speaker.

Their daughter Pratima Gohain married an engineer, Ghana Kanta Gohain.

Their youngest son Prabin Kumar Gogoi was an eminent scholar, and an educationist. He held various important functions in the Education department in the Government of Assam.
