= Sibsagar Assembly constituency =

Constituency of the Assam legislative assembly in India

Sibsagar
- Constituency No. 96 for the Assam Legislative Assembly

Constituency details
- Country: India
- Region: Northeast India
- State: Assam
- District: Sivasagar
- Lok Sabha constituency: Jorhat
- Established: 1951
- Reservation: None

Member of Legislative Assembly
- 16th Assam Legislative Assembly
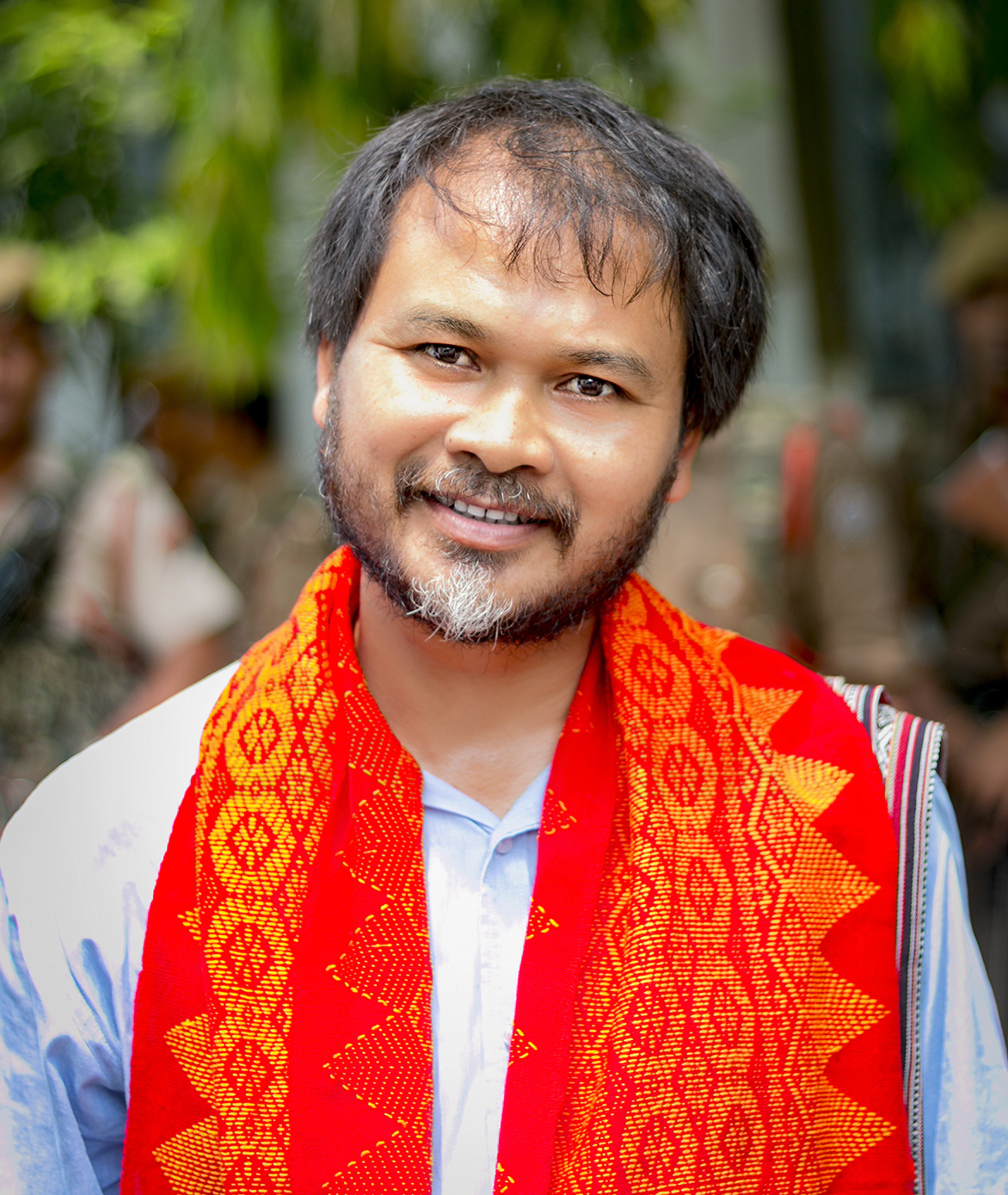
- Incumbent Akhil Gogoi
- Party: RD
- Elected year: 2021

Sibsagar Assembly constituency is one of the 126 assembly constituencies of Assam Legislative Assembly. Sibsagar is part of the Jorhat Lok Sabha constituency.

== Members of Legislative Assembly ==
Election	Member	Party affiliation
1952	Thanuram Gogoi	Indian National Congress
1957	Girindra Nath Gogoi	Indian National Congress
1962	Girindra Nath Gogoi	Indian National Congress
1967	Promode Gogoi	Communist Party of India
1972	Promode Gogoi	Communist Party of India
1978	Promode Gogoi	Communist Party of India
1983	Devananda Konwer	Indian National Congress
1985	Prodip Gogoi	Independent
1991	Promode Gogoi	Communist Party of India
1996	Promode Gogoi	Communist Party of India
2001	Pranab Gogoi	Indian National Congress
2006	Pranab Gogoi	Indian National Congress
2011	Pranab Gogoi	Indian National Congress
2016	Pranab Gogoi	Indian National Congress
2021	Akhil Gogoi	Raijor Dal
2026	Akhil Gogoi	Raijor Dal

== Election results ==
=== 2026 ===
2026 Assam Legislative Assembly election: Sibsagar
Party	Candidate	Votes	%	±%
RD	Akhil Gogoi	86,521	49.38	+3.32
BJP	Kushal Dowari	69,249	39.52	+3.02
AGP	Prodip Hazarika	14,757	8.42	new
NOTA	None of the above	1,719	0.98	+0.47
Majority		17,272	9.86	+0.30
Turnout		1,75,209		
Registered electors				
RD hold		Swing		

=== 2021 ===
2021 Assam Legislative Assembly election: Sibsagar
Party	Candidate	Votes	%	±%
RD	Akhil Gogoi	57,219	46.06	new
BJP	Surabhi Rajkonwar	45,344	36.5	−5.89
INC	Subhramitra Gogoi	19,329	15.56	−27.3
NCP	Ajit Hazarika	434	0.35	N/A
Independent	Rupa Borah	819	0.66	N/A
Independent	Hemanta Boruah	435	0.35	N/A
NOTA	None of the above	639	0.51	−0.27
Majority		11,875	9.56	+9.09
Turnout		1,24,219	81.90	−.09
Registered electors		1,51,675		+9.73%
RD gain from INC		Swing		

=== 2016 ===
2016 Assam Legislative Assembly election: Sibsagar
Party	Candidate	Votes	%	±%
INC	Pranab Gogoi	48,584	42.86	−8.55
BJP	Surabhi Rajkonwar	48,042	42.39	+36.71
Independent	Ashini Chetia	10,188	8.98	N/A
CPI	Jiten Gohain	2,174	1.91	−4.60
Independent	Jayanta Rajkonwar	1,506	1.32	N/A
Independent	Anwar Hussain	722	0.63	N/A
AIUDF	Dilshad Hussain Ahmed	663	0.58	−0.52
LDP	Gunin Basumatary	559	0.49	N/A
NOTA	None of the above	893	0.78	N/A
Majority		542	0.47	−17.65
Turnout		1,13,331	81.99	+10.52
Registered electors		1,38,225		+3.76%
INC hold		Swing		

=== 2011 ===
2011 Assam Legislative Assembly election: Sibsagar
Party	Candidate	Votes	%	±%
INC	Pranab Gogoi	48,941	51.41	
AGP	Pranabjit Chaliha	31,691	33.29	
CPI	Promode Gogoi	6,196	6.51	
BJP	Jayanta Rajkonwar	5,405	5.68	
NCP	Mujibur Rahman	1,272	1.34	
AIUDF	Amanuddin Ahmed	1,049	1.10	
AITC	Pradip Pachani	650	0.68	
Majority		17,250	18.12	
Turnout		95,204	71.47	
Registered electors		1,33,211		
INC hold		Swing		

== See also ==
- List of constituencies of the Assam Legislative Assembly
- Sivasagar district
