= Mrinal Hazarika =

Indian terrorist

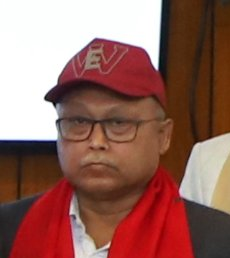
- Born: Plaban Phukan
- Predecessor: Tapan Baruah
- Successor: Prabal Neog
- Status: Announced ceasefire
- Criminal charges: Terrorism

Mrinal Hazarika (Assamese: মৃনাল হাজৰিকা) alias Plaban Phukan is the ex-commander of the 28th Battalion of ULFA, the banned revolutionary organisation of Assam. He was instrumental in leading the ‘A’ and ‘C’ companies of the battalion to announce a ceasefire.

== Arrest and release ==
He was arrested in 2005 from a hotel in Siliguri. He is said to have assured the police top brass of his ability to win over his former colleagues. The Assam Police played a pro-active role in releasing him on bail so that he could negotiate with the fence-sitting ULFA cadres. On Saturday 21 June 2008 he walked out of prison on bail from Dibrugarh Central Jail.

== Announcement of ceasefire ==
Within three days of his release, Hazarika was able to secure a ceasefire declaration by the ‘A’ and ‘C’ company of the battalion and announced ceasefire on 24 June 2008. Loyal lieutenants of the outfit remained crucial to the top down chain of command. Commanders like Charan Majhi, Debojit Konwar, Palashmoni Rajbonshi, Ulum Bhuyan and Amar Tanti were already eliminated by security forces in separate encounters. Other leaders like Prabal Neog and Dibakar Moran, were arrested, and Ghanakanta Bora surrendered. Under these circumstances, despite the fact that Hazarika had been in jail since 2005, it was not a difficult task for him to convince and win over the surviving low level commanders. However, Bijoy Chinese, a close confidant of Paresh Baruah and Sujit Moran, the ‘B’ company commander, distanced themselves from the pro-ceasefire group.

== Post ceasefire ==
"We have given up our original demand for sovereignty. We are now looking for an acceptable solution to our problems within the framework of the Indian Constitution."

— Mrinal Hazarika.

Hazarika, along with his colleagues Dibakar Moran, Prabal Neog and Jiten Dutta have built up a popular movement for peace in the State. They have addressed local organisations, held public meetings and road shows, and also issued numerous press statements asking the ULFA top brass to change their course. They submitted a charter of demands to the prime minister of India Manmohan Singh. They also participated in the first round of formal talk, initiated by the central government on 29 October 2009, with Assistant Director of Intelligence Bureau R. N. Ravi. They gave up their original demand of sovereignty and asked for greater autonomy for the state.

== See also ==
- List of top leaders of ULFA
- Sanjukta Mukti Fouj
- 28th Battalion (ULFA)
