= 28th Battalion (ULFA) =

28th Battalion, ULFA
- Active: 1998-2011
- Disbanded: 2011
- Country: Assam, India
- Branch: ULFA
- Type: Guerrilla
- Role: Shock troops
- Size: 3 Companies (500+ cadres)
- Garrison/HQ: Myanmar
- Nickname: Kashmir Camp

Commanders
- 1st Commander: Tapan Baruah (Killed on May 20, 2002)
- 2nd Commander: Mrinal Hazarika
- 3rd Commander: Prabal Neog
- 4th Commander: Bijoy Chinese
- Notable commanders: Tapan Baruah †

The 28th Battalion, also known as the Kashmir Camp for its ferocity, was ULFA's dreaded and most potent strike unit, key to the outfit's activities in the districts of Upper Assam. The battalion headquarters were based somewhere in eastern Myanmar and was led by some of the better trained and motivated commanders.

At the time of decisive, it consisted of three companies – Alpha (A), led by Jiten Dutta alias Moon Bora, Bravo (B) led by Sujit Mohan and Charlie (C), led by Jone Bhuyan(disputed).

The battalion was the group's main source of funding.

== Commanders ==
- Biplop Gohain
- Bhaiti Gogoi
- Anal Kakati
- Tapan Baruah alias Madan Das (Killed in action on 20 May 2002)
- Mrinal Hazarika alias Plaban Phukan (Captured in 2005)
- Prabal Neog alias Benudhar Bora (Captured on 17 September 2007)
- Bijoy Das alias Bijoy Chinese (Surrendered in 2013)

== Armoury ==
The cadres of 28 Battalion were equipped with various sophisticated weapons including: Ak 56 rifles, M21 sniper rifles, Light machine guns, Universal machine guns, some RPGs, and two inch mortars etc. One of its units had a special bomb squad attached to it.

== Ceasefire ==
On Tuesday, June 24, 2008, 'A' and 'C' companies of the battalion announced a unilateral ceasefire to facilitate peace talks with the government.

More than 200 cadres led by at least five of their commanders came over-ground and christened themselves the "Pro-talk ULFA faction". They gave up the demand for independence for Assam and instead sought maximum autonomy for the state. 'A' company had been active in the eastern Tinsukia and Dibrugarh districts as well as in adjoining Arunachal Pradesh. 'C' company was active in Sibsagar and Golaghat districts. 'B' company seemed to be outside the purview of the truce as its commander, Sujit Moran, distanced himself from the pro-ceasefire group. Meanwhile, Mrinal Hazarika, made it clear that they would not surrender before the government and would be residing with arms in designated camps set-up at Chapakhowa, Tinsukia.

== Split in ULFA? ==
Although it looks like a split in the group, senior ULFA commander (pro-talk) Jiten Dutta, said that the ULFA was not split and they would disclose everything as to why they had decided to declare the unilateral ceasefire. "Since most of the top leaders and cadres of 'B' company are at bases abroad, they are not in a position to declare the truce," Dutta said.

== Appealing mass-support ==
After their announcement of a ceasefire, the leaders began interacting with various organisations and individuals to mobilise support to their declaration of a unilateral ceasefire and the peace process they had initiated. On Sunday, July 7, 2008, Mrinal Hazarika, led a delegation of 'A' and 'C' companies to interact with leaders of the Asom Jatiyatabadi Yuba Chatra Parishad (AJYCP) and the All Assam Students’ Union (AASU). An executive of AASU was said to have discussed the appeal of the pro-talk faction for support to their efforts to mobilise public opinion to put pressure on the unit's central leadership. On Tuesday, July 8, 2008 Nirjatan Birodhi Aikya Mancha organized a meeting at Sadiya to back the unilateral truce declaration by the battalion.

== Expulsion of leaders ==
"Self-styled Captain Mrinal Hazarika, Second Lieutenant Moon Bora and Joon Sonowal have been expelled from the primary membership of the organisation and all activities of these three leaders that they had been doing in the name of ULFA have been declared as 'illegal and unconstitutional'".

— Arabinda Rajkhowa in a declaration e-mailed to newspapers and media houses.

The ULFA C-in-C Paresh Baruah, is understood to have disbanded 'A' and 'C' companies of the battalion and reportedly issued threats to those compromising commanders, Mrinal Hazarika (Commander of the battalion), Moon Bora, alias Jiten Dutta, ('A' company commander) and Joon Sonowal ('C' company commander). The group had expelled those leaders on Monday July 7, 2008, for "unauthorised declaration of unilateral truce and initiating the dialogue process with the Government of India in violation of the ULFA constitution." Arabinda Rajkhowa, the group's chairman, appealed to all cadres of the unit and the people of Assam not to extend any cooperation to the expelled persons’ activities.

== Merging of 'B' and 'C' companies ==
'B' company was merged with the remaining cadres of 'C' company who had not joined the pro-ceasefire group and Bijoy Chinese had been appointed as the new commander of the battalion.

== Submission of Demands ==
The pro-talk ULFA leaders Mrinal Hazarika, Prabal Neog and Jiten Dutta, in a press conference in Guwahati, revealed that they had submitted a charter containing 18 demands to the Prime Minister, Manmohan Singh, through Assam's chief minister Tarun Gogoi.

The demands include:

1. Full autonomy within the framework of the Indian constitution.
2. a) To keep 70% of seats reserved for the indigenous people in the Assam Legislative Assembly and b) To create an Upper House comprising indigenous and ethnic people.
3. To seal the Indo-Bangla border to check illegal infiltration.
4. To detect and deport foreign nationals taking 25.03.1971 to be the cut off year as per the memorandum of understanding between the AASU and the Government of India.
5. To detect foreign nationals by preparing a revised national register of citizens of 1951.
6. The detection of foreign nationals to be kept in a special/specific area and to deport them phase-wise.
7. To introduce dual citizenship.
8. To introduce the system of an inter-state permit.
9. To form a border commission to find solutions of the border disputes of the north-eastern states.
10. To adopt a scientific approach to the flood related problems and to recognize the floods in Assam as a national calamity.
11. Immediate steps to be taken to stop hydro-electric projects which will cause immense damage to the state of Assam.
12. To open and develop the Ledo Road to connect Assam with south-east Asia immediately.
13. To have dialogue with all the insurgent groups of the north-east to restore permanent peace in the region.
14. To declare the river Brahmaputra to be a national waterway.
15. To take the steps necessary to declare Majuli a world heritage site, (by the government of India).
16. A special task force to be constituted by recruiting the indigenous people of the north-east and to deploy them on the indo-Bangla border to check infiltration and safeguard the frontier.
17. To construct a seventh bridge across the Brahmaputra to connect Nimatighat and Majuli.
18. The immediate release of the four central committee leaders of ULFA from jail.

== Threat to go underground ==
After we announced the ceasefire, there is complete peace in the entire Assam area (Assam) with not a single incident of violence taking place in the past one year. But despite our best efforts and our decision to climb down from our earlier demand of sovereignty or independence to seeking greater autonomy, both the state and the central government simply sat tight and refused to hold talks with us….

— Jiten Dutta as told to IANS

Being disheartened at the delay in the talk-process, this pro-talk faction on Monday, June 22, 2009, threatened to go back to the jungle, blaming a lack of any government initiative to begin peace talks. The pro-talk ULFA faction leader Jiten Dutta told the Indian News Agency (IANS) that after their announcement of a ceasefire entire Assam was at peace and not a single incident of violence had taken place in the past year. He blamed the government and various pressure groups, individuals, organisations and intellectuals of Assam for paying no heed to their peace overtures.

== First round of talks ==
On Thursday, October 29, 2009, the Central government initiated the first round of formal talks with the pro-talk faction of the ULFA. Three leaders of the pro-talk faction -- Mrinal Hazarika, Prabal Neog ang Jiten Dutta participated in an hour-long meeting with the assistant director of the Indian Intelligence Bureau, R. N. Ravi, held in a secret location somewhere in Guwahati. They once again reiterated their demands and urged the official to take steps for furthering the peace process. They claimed the meeting had ended on a very positive note.

== See also ==
- Sanjukta Mukti Fouj
- List of top ULFA leaders
- Mina Gogoi
