= People's Freedom Movement =

People's Freedom Movement can refer to:

- People's Freedom Movement (Jamaica)
- People's Freedom Movement (Serbia)

== See also ==
- People's Freedom Party (disambiguation)
- People's Liberation Party (disambiguation)
