= Thowra Assembly constituency =

Assembly constituency of Assam

Coordinates: 27.14°N 94.80°E

Thowra
- Former constituency No. 107 for the Assam Legislative Assembly

Constituency details
- Country: India
- Region: Northeast India
- State: Assam
- Division: Upper Assam
- District: Sivasagar
- Lok Sabha constituency: Jorhat
- Established: 1957
- Abolished: 2023
- Reservation: None

Thowra was one of the 126 assembly constituencies of Assam Legislative Assembly. Thowra formed part of the Jorhat Lok Sabha constituency. This constituency was abolished in 2023.

The main area was located around a tea garden known as Thowra Tea Estate. As such, though it is one of the many tea gardens in Assam, it boasts of having a golf field. However recently, the field lacks maintenance and is a common grazing ground.

== Members of Legislative Assembly ==
| Election | Member | Party affiliation |
|---|---|---|
| 1957 | Durgeswar Saikia | Indian National Congress |
| 1962 | Durgeswar Saikia | Indian National Congress |
| 1967 | Durgeswar Saikia | Indian National Congress |
| 1972 | Narau Kumar | Indian National Congress |
| 1978 | Jogen Gogoi | Communist Party of India |
| 1983 | Tankeswar Dehingia | Indian National Congress |
| 1985 | Barki Prasad Telenga | Asom Gana Parishad |
| 1991 | Devanand Konwar | Indian National Congress |
| 1996 | Devanand Konwar | Indian National Congress |
| 2001 | Devanand Konwar | Indian National Congress |
| 2006 | Kushal Dowari | Independent |
| 2011 | Sushanta Borgohain | Indian National Congress |
| 2016 | Kushal Dowari | Bharatiya Janata Party |
| 2021 | Sushanta Borgohain | Indian National Congress |
| 2021^ | Sushanta Borgohain | Bharatiya Janata Party |

^ Indicates Bye-Elections

== Election results ==
=== 2021 by-election ===
2021 Assam Legislative Assembly By-Election: Thowra
| Party | Candidate | Votes | % | ±% |
|---|---|---|---|---|
| BJP | Sushanta Borgohain | 54,956 | 61.99 | + |
| RD | Dhaijya Konwar | 24,395 | 27.52 | + |
| INC | Monuranjan Konwar | 5,892 | 6.65 | − |
| CPI | Krishna Gogoi | 1,985 | 2.24 | + |
| None of the Above | None of the Above | 726 | 0.82 | − |
| Independent | Lohit Gowala | 703 | 0.79 | + |
| Majority | | 30,561 | 33.27 | |
| Turnout | | 88,657 | | |
| BJP gain from INC | | Swing | | |

=== 2021 ===
2021 Assam Legislative Assembly election: Thowra
| Party | Candidate | Votes | % | ±% |
|---|---|---|---|---|
| INC | Sushanta Borgohain | 48,026 | | |
| BJP | Kushal Dowari | 46,020 | | |
| Majority | | 2,006 | 2.09 | |
| Turnout | | 97,216 | 83.81 | |
| INC gain from BJP | | Swing | | |

=== 2016 ===
2016 Assam Legislative Assembly election: Thowra
| Party | Candidate | Votes | % | ±% |
|---|---|---|---|---|
| BJP | Kushal Dowari | 41,560 | 48.41 | |
| INC | Sushanta Borgohain | 40,334 | 46.98 | |
| CPI | Kushal Borgohain | 2,066 | 2.40 | |
| NOTA | None of the above | 1,876 | 2.18 | |
| Majority | | 1,226 | 1.43 | |
| Turnout | | 85,836 | 86.04 | |
| Registered electors | | 99,755 | | |
| BJP gain from INC | | Swing | | |
