= Prabal Neog =

ULFA militant

- Born: Lesenga Gaon, Makum, Tinsukia, Assam
- Other names: Benudhar Bora, Amar Moran
- Predecessor: Mrinal Hazarika
- Successor: Bijoy Das
- Spouse: Bonti Lahon
- Children: One son
- Parent: Jonaki Bora (Mother)
- Status: Announced ceasefire
- Criminal charges: Terrorism

Prabal Neog (Assamese: প্ৰৱাল নেওগ), aliases Benudhar Bora and Amar Moran, is an ex-commander of the 28th Battalion of ULFA, the banned militant outfit of Assam. Neog baceme commander of 28th Battalion of ULFA in 2002 after the death of the battalion's founding commander Tapan Baruah alias Madan Das.

Neog hails from Lesenga village at Makum in Tinsukia district of Assam. His wife Bonti Lahon, who is also said to be an ULFA cadre, hails from Moran in Dibrugarh district. He joined the outfit in 1988 and was trained in guerrilla operations in Myanmar. Before his militancy life, he was the vice-president of Asom Jatiyatabadi Yuba Chatra Parishad, Tinsukia district unit.

== Arrest and release ==
On 17 September 2008, police arrested Neog along with his wife and son from Tezpur. He was carrying about Rs 2.8 lakh in cash but no arms or any incriminating document was recovered from him at the time of his arrest. On 23 July 2008, he was released from the Dibrugarh Central Jail. Now he is one of the leaders of the Pro-talk ULFA.

== Charges ==
He is said to be the main planner and the key executor of the killings of Hindi-speaking people in Assam. Besides, according to police, he was also involved in a large number of bomb blasts and almost all major extortion operations in the state.

== See also ==
- List of top leaders of ULFA
- Sanjukta Mukti Fouj
- 28th Battalion (ULFA)
