= Pranab Kumar Gogoi =

Indian lawyer and politician (1936–2020)

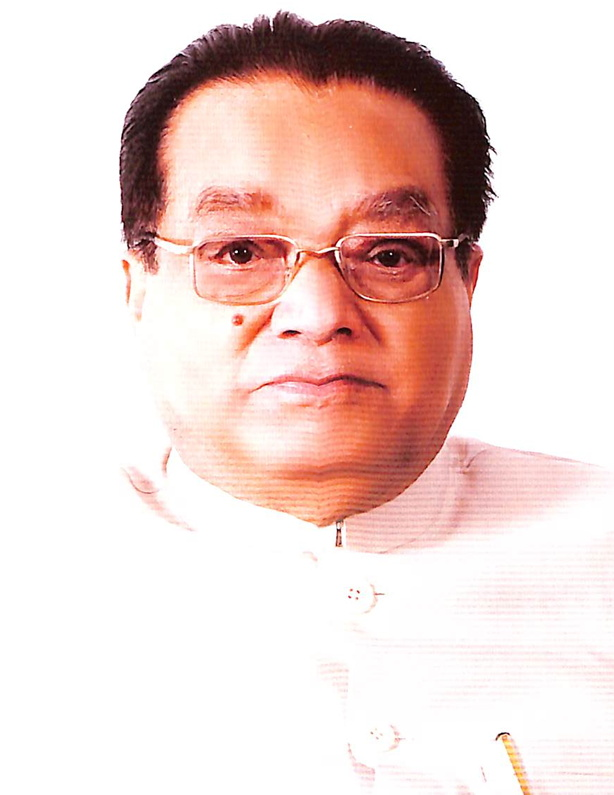
- Official portrait

Speaker of the Assam Legislative Assembly
- In office 6 June 2011 – 28 March 2016
- Deputy: Bhimananda Tanti
- Preceded by: Tanka Bahadur Rai
- Succeeded by: Ranjeet Kumar Dass

Cabinet Minister, Assam
- In office 21 May 2006 – 30 May 2011
- Chief Minister: Tarun Gogoi
- Departments: Handloom, Textiles and Sericulture; Judicial, Legislative and Law
- Preceded by: Hemoprova Saikia (Handloom); Dinesh Prasad Goala (Law)
- Succeeded by: Pranati Phukan (Handloom); Tanka Bahadur Rai (Law)

Member, Assam Legislative Assembly
- In office 13 May 2001 – 3 February 2020
- Preceded by: Promode Gogoi
- Succeeded by: Akhil Gogoi
- Constituency: Sibsagar

Personal details
- Born: 19 August 1936 Dibrugarh, Assam, British India
- Died: 3 February 2020 (aged 83) Guwahati, Assam, India
- Party: Indian National Congress
- Spouse: Mohini Gogoi
- Children: 3
- Parent(s): Girindra Nath Gogoi (Father); Hiranyalata Gogoi (Mother)
- Education: Guwahati University

Pranab Kumar Gogoi (19 August 1936 – 3 February 2020) was an Indian lawyer and politician from Assam belonging to Indian National Congress. He was elected four times as a legislator of the Assam Legislative Assembly. He also served as the speaker of the Assam Legislative Assembly and minister of the Government of Assam.

== Early life and education ==
Gogoi was born on 19 August 1936 in Guwahati to Girindra Nath Gogoi and Hiranyalata Gogoi. His father was a minister in the Government of Assam. He received an LLB degree from Guwahati University in 1961.

== Political career ==
Gogoi was elected as a legislator of the Assam Legislative Assembly from Sibsagar in 2001. He was re-elected from that constituency in 2006. He served as a minister of the Government of Assam from 2006 to 2011. In 2011 he was again elected from Sibsagar. He was appointed the speaker of the Assam Legislative Assembly on 6 June 2011. He served in the post till 28 May 2016. During this time he took steps for a consensus definition of "Assamese" in 2015. After consultations with 53 organisations he recommended the year 1951 be taken as the cut-off period for the definition of Assamese and National Register of Citizens for Assam. In 2016 he was elected as a legislator of the Assam Legislative Assembly from Sibsagar for the fourth consecutive time.

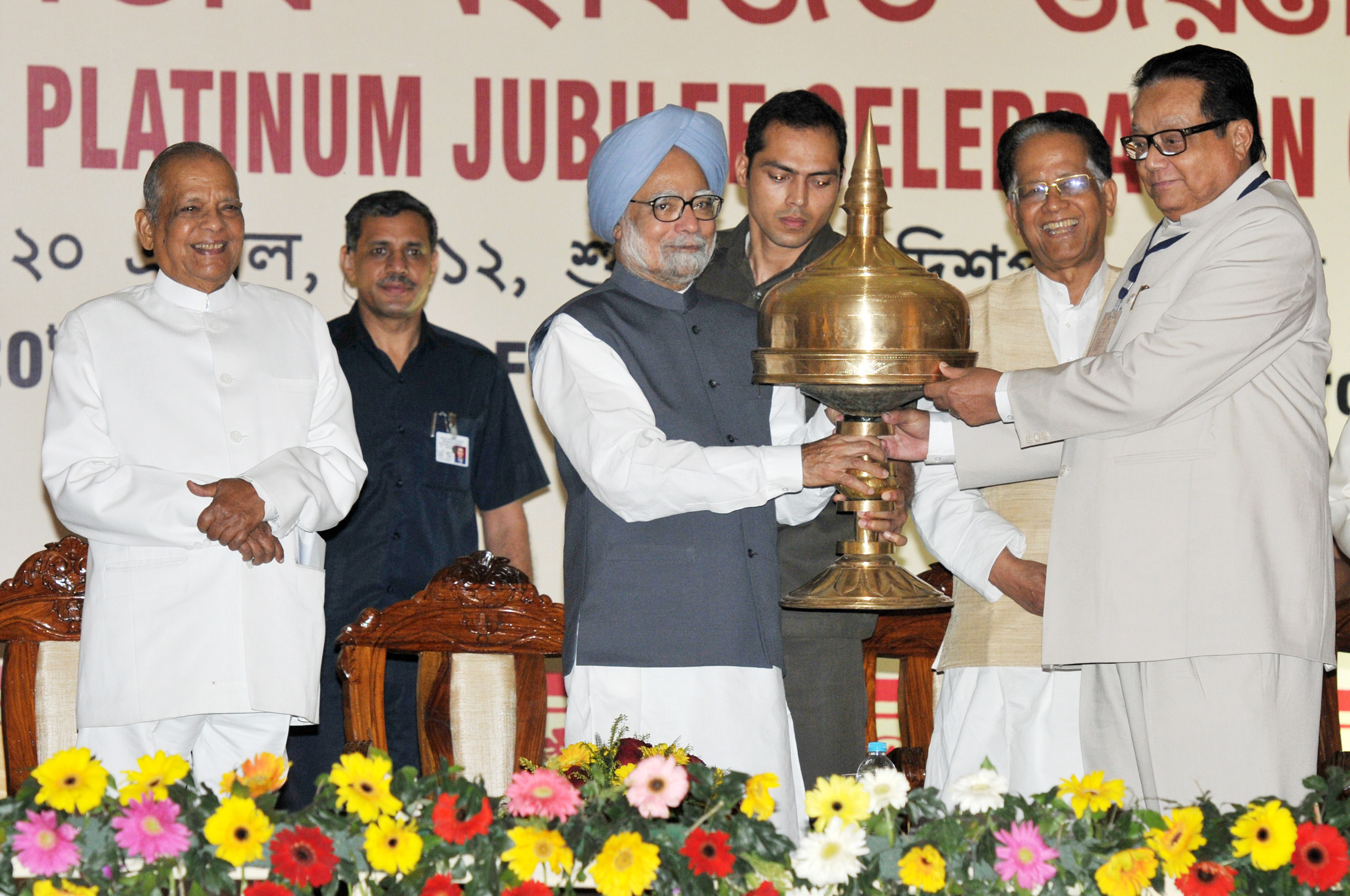
Gogoi presenting a memento to Prime Minister Manmohan Singh, with Chief Minister Tarun Gogoi and Governor Janaki Ballabh Patnaik.

== Personal life and death ==
Gogoi was married to Mohini Gogoi. Together they had 3 sons - Manjir, Sameer and Prameer.

Gogoi died on 3 February 2020 at a private hospital in Guwahati at the age of 83. He was survived by his wife, their sons, and the spouses and children of their sons. Chief Minister Sarbananda Sonowal, former Chief Minister Tarun Gogoi, Ripun Bora and other politicians all paid tribute.

=== Funeral ===
Gogoi's body, wrapped in the national flag, was brought to his residence located at Red Cross Road on 4 February at around 7 p.m. His body was taken to Rajiv Bhavan and Sibsagar Bar Association where Congress members and members of the bar association paid tribute.

Gogoi was cremated with full state honours at Hahchara Jathipatia village in Sivasagar district in presence of relatives and leaders from political parties. His mortal remains were cremated by his three sons Manjir, Sameer and Prameer at 2 PM amidst gun salute by Assam Police personnel. Hundreds of mourners came to the cremation site. Leaders of different political parties and organizations laid wreaths on the mortal remains and a gun salute was given before the last rites. Leader of the Opposition Debabrata Saikia, Rakibul Hussain, BJP leaders, administrative officials, including Sivasagar Deputy Commissioner MS Lakshmi Priya were present.
