= Gana Mukti Sangram Asom =

Gana Mukti Sangram, Asom (Assamese:গণ মুক্তি সংগ্ৰাম, অসম) was a regional Indian political party of Assam, founded on 20 March 2015, at Moranhat, Assam. This was announced by activist Akhil Gogoi after a speech by Gandhian leader Anna Hazare at the 4th 2-yearly conference of Krishak Mukti Sangram Samiti (KMSS). "The party aims at changing the capitalist system of India" said Gogoi.

In 2017, during the 5th bi-annual Conference of Krishak Mukti Sangram Samiti, Akhil Gogoi announced that the party would contest in the next elections.

In 2020, Gana Mukti Sangram Asom merged with Raijor Dal.
