= Jogen Gogoi =

Indian politician (born 1922)

Member of the Assam Legislative Assembly
- In office 1978–1983
- Preceded by: Narau Kamar
- Succeeded by: Tankeswar Dehingia
- Constituency: Thowra

Personal details
- Born: 1922; Sivasagar, India

Jogen Gogoi (born 1922) was an Indian politician and leader of Communist Party of India. He was elected to the Assam Legislative Assembly in the 1978 elections, representing the Thowra constituency from 1978 to 1983.
