= Mina Gogoi =

Indian terrorist

- Born: Assam
- Other names: Akoni Gogoi, Binita Bora
- Spouse: Jitul Bora
- Status: Arrested
- Criminal charges: Terrorism

Mina Gogoi (Assamese: মিনা গগৈ), aliases Akoni Gogoi and Binita Bora was a woman sergeant of the 28th Battalion of ULFA, a banned terrorist outfit of Assam. She is the wife of Jitul Bora alias Ramen Dadhumia, the self-styled lance corporal and area commander of the same battalion. She joined the outfit in 1996 and was trained in Bhutan and Myanmar. She is regarded as one of the oldest women cadre of the outfit.

== Arrest ==
On 26 November 2009, the army at Sonari under Charaideo sub division at Namtola-Ladoigarh, arrested Gogoi while she was trying to sneak into Assam from Nagaland where she had been taking shelter. The security force recovered from her 5 kg of improvised explosive device (IED), a .22 pistol, some photographs and a register containing details of funds collected by the outfit in Charaideo subdivision.

== See also ==
- List of top leaders of ULFA
- Sanjukta Mukti Fouj
