= Bijoy Das =

ULFA rebel

- Born: Nalbari, Assam
- Status: Overground for Peace Talk
- Other name: Bijoy Chinese
- Spouse: Mainu Moran
- Criminal charges: Terrorism

Bijoy Das, known as Bijoy Chinese, was a commanding officer of 28th battalion of ULFA, the banned terrorist organisation in Assam. He hails from Nalbari district of Assam. He was working as an adjutant to Prabal Neog, the former commanding officer of the battalion, till Neog's arrest. He had also been holding the post of deputy commander of the battalion with Bhaskar Hazarika, another top ULFA leader. According to police he is a moderate who favours a political solution to the insurgency in Assam. After Arabinda Rajkhowa and his followers joined peace talk with the Union of India, Paresh Baruah promoted Bijoy Chinese from Lieutenant to Major and appointed him as Deputy C-in-C of Eastern Command of the ULFA.

On 21 February 2013, Bijoy Das alias Bijoy Chinese left the Paresh Baruah faction and joined the Arabinda Rajkhowa-led Pro-Talk faction.

After coming overground, Bijoy said that "he will never leave the principles and ideology taught by Paresh Baruah" and "he fully support Paresh Baruah and his ideals only". He believes that "only Paresh Baruah will be able to resolve the issue of Assam." He further said that Baruah should stay in the hideouts and "guide his followers as he is the right person."

== See also ==
- List of top leaders of ULFA
- People's Consultative Group
- Sanjukta Mukti Fouj
