= Sushanta Borgohain =

Indian politician

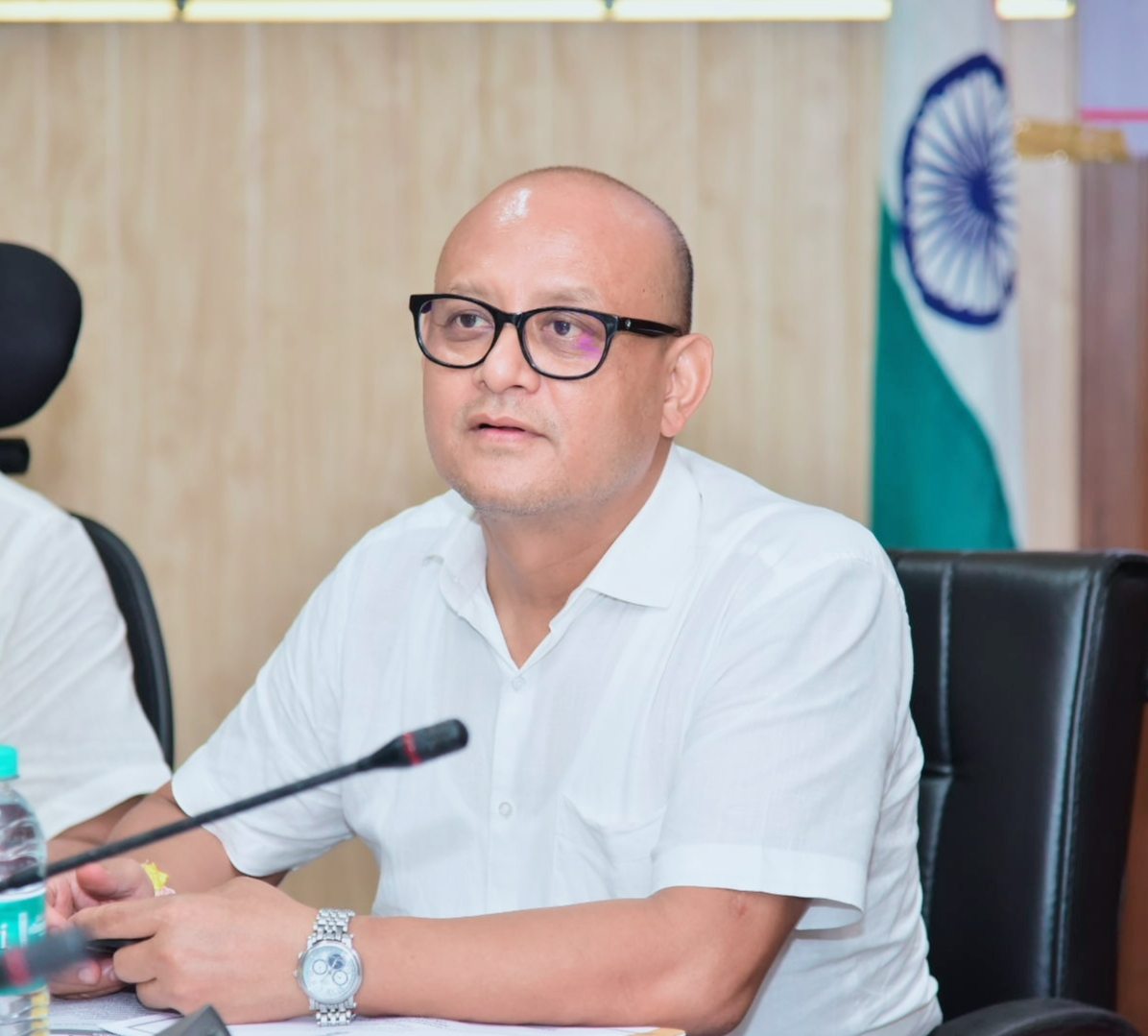

Member of Assam Legislative Assembly
- Incumbent
- Assumed office 2 November 2021
- Preceded by: Kushal Dowari
- Constituency: Thowra

Member of Assam Legislative Assembly
- In office 2011–2016
- Preceded by: Kushal Dowari
- Succeeded by: Kushal Dowari
- Constituency: Thowra

Personal details
- Born: 27April Sivasagar
- Party: Bharatiya Janata Party
- Other political affiliations: Indian National Congress
- Spouse: Angkita Changmai
- Education: B.A.
- Alma mater: VKV DIGBOI; Thriveni Academy (HS), Tamil Nadu; Nandalal Borgohain City College (BA); Delhi University
- Profession: Businessman

Sushanta Borgohain (27 April 1974) is an Indian politician from Assam. He is also a bike rider.

== Early life and education ==
Borgohain was born in Sivasagar to Noni Borgohain and Bishnu Prasad Borgohain. He has an older sister, Rinku Datta. He did his schooling at VKV, Digboi and then passed High School from Tribeni Academy, Tamil Nadu. He had a short stint in Delhi University before coming back to Assam to complete his BA.

== Career ==
Borgohain was elected to the Assam Legislative Assembly from Thowra in Shivsagar district in the 2021 Assam Legislative Assembly election as a member of the Indian National Congress. He previously served in the state legislature from 2011 to 2016. In June 2021, he resigned from the Indian National Congress due to internal differences in the party. He joined Bharatiya Janata Party in presence of Chief Minister of Assam Himanta Biswa Sarma.
