= Krishak Mukti Sangram Samiti =

Krishak Mukti Sangram Samiti (KMSS) is a peasant organisation based in Assam. Formed by the RTI activist Akhil Gogoi in 2005, the organisation works on a diverse range of issues from Public Distribution System (PDS) thefts, non-implementation of National Rural Employment Guarantee Act (NREGA), land rights, governmental and corporate corruption, Right to Information Act (RTI) and construction of big dams in fragile seismic territories of north east India. The organisation came to national limelight after it joined the agitation against corruption under the leadership of Gandhian activist Anna Hazare. However, KMSS broke with India Against Corruption campaign after some of the IAC members decided to form a political party. Explaining the reasons to resign from IAC, KMSS General Secretary Akhil Gogoi said that the support IAC had received was only for building up a strong and sustained mass movement against rampant corruption, and not floating an election-centred political party.

== Campaign against big dams ==
Since mid-2009, KMSS has been leading a statewide movement against construction of big dams in the ecologically sensitive regions of Assam and Arunachal Pradesh. In particular KMSS demands immediate halt to the ongoing construction of the dam of Lower Subansiri, a mega hydroelectric power project under NHPC with an estimated capacity of 2000 MW.

== Campaign against fraudulent financial institutions ==
From February 2013, KMSS was leading a campaign against mushrooming of chit funds and such related activities encouraged by financial institutions of dubious nature in the state. The organisation threatened to go to court if government does not take appropriate action against such institutions.

== Campaign for peasant access to markets ==
Of late KMSS has opened a number of provisional retail outlets in different parts of Guwahati city to facilitate direct access of rural peasantry with urban markets. Claiming it as an alternative to FDI in Retail as well as mafia-run-syndicates, KMSS expressed its plan to open more outlets in the city on a permanent basis. These outlets will be run by the peasants themselves and will sell agrarian products on a drastically lower price, removing the middleman in between. On the very first day of the opening of the outlets, more than hundred quintals of vegetables have been reported to be sold within a few hours.

== See also ==
- Akhil Gogoi
