= Kushal Dowari =

Indian politician

Member of Assam Legislative Assembly
- In office 2016–2021
- Preceded by: Sushanta Borgohain
- Succeeded by: Sushanta Borgohain
- Constituency: Thowra

Member of Assam Legislative Assembly
- In office 2006–2011
- Preceded by: Devanand Konwar
- Succeeded by: Sushanta Borgohain
- Constituency: Thowra

Personal details
- Born: 1 July 1966 (age 59) Sivasagar
- Party: Bharatiya Janata Party
- Spouse(s): Subhalaxmi Dutta, APS

Kushal Dowari (born 1 July 1966 in Bokata Khamun, Sivasagar) is a Bharatiya Janata Party politician from Assam. He was elected in the Assam Legislative Assembly election in 2016 from Thowra constituency.

Dowari was a SULFA leader before being elected as an MLA in 2006.

== ULFA involvement ==
Dowari, under the alias of Jayanta Hazarika, was a ULFA cadre and surrendered on 15 April 1991. Dowari was also questioned in relation to the killing of journalist Kamala Saikia. He is alleged to have been involved in the secret killings of Assam.

== Electoral history ==
2021 Assam Legislative Assembly election: Thowra
Party	Candidate	Votes	%	±%
INC	Sushanta Borgohain	48,026		
BJP	Kushal Dowari	46,020		
Majority		2,006	2.09	
Turnout		97,216	83.81	
INC gain from BJP		Swing		

2016 Assam Legislative Assembly election: Thowra
Party	Candidate	Votes	%	±%
BJP	Kushal Dowari	41,560	48.41	
INC	Sushanta Borgohain	40,334	46.98	
CPI	Kushal Borgohain	2,066	2.40	
NOTA	None of the above	1,876	2.18	
Majority		1,226	1.43	
Turnout		85,836	86.04	
Registered electors		99,755		
BJP gain from INC		Swing		

2006 Assam Legislative Assembly election: Thowra
Party	Candidate	Votes	%	±%
Independent	Kushal Dowari	22,022		
BJP	Siba Bodra	15,611		
Independent gain from INC		Swing		

2001 Assam Legislative Assembly election: Thowra
Party	Candidate	Votes	%	±%
INC	Devananda Konwar	24,976		
Independent	Siba Bodra	12,720		
INC hold		Swing		
