= Akhil Gogoi =

Indian activist

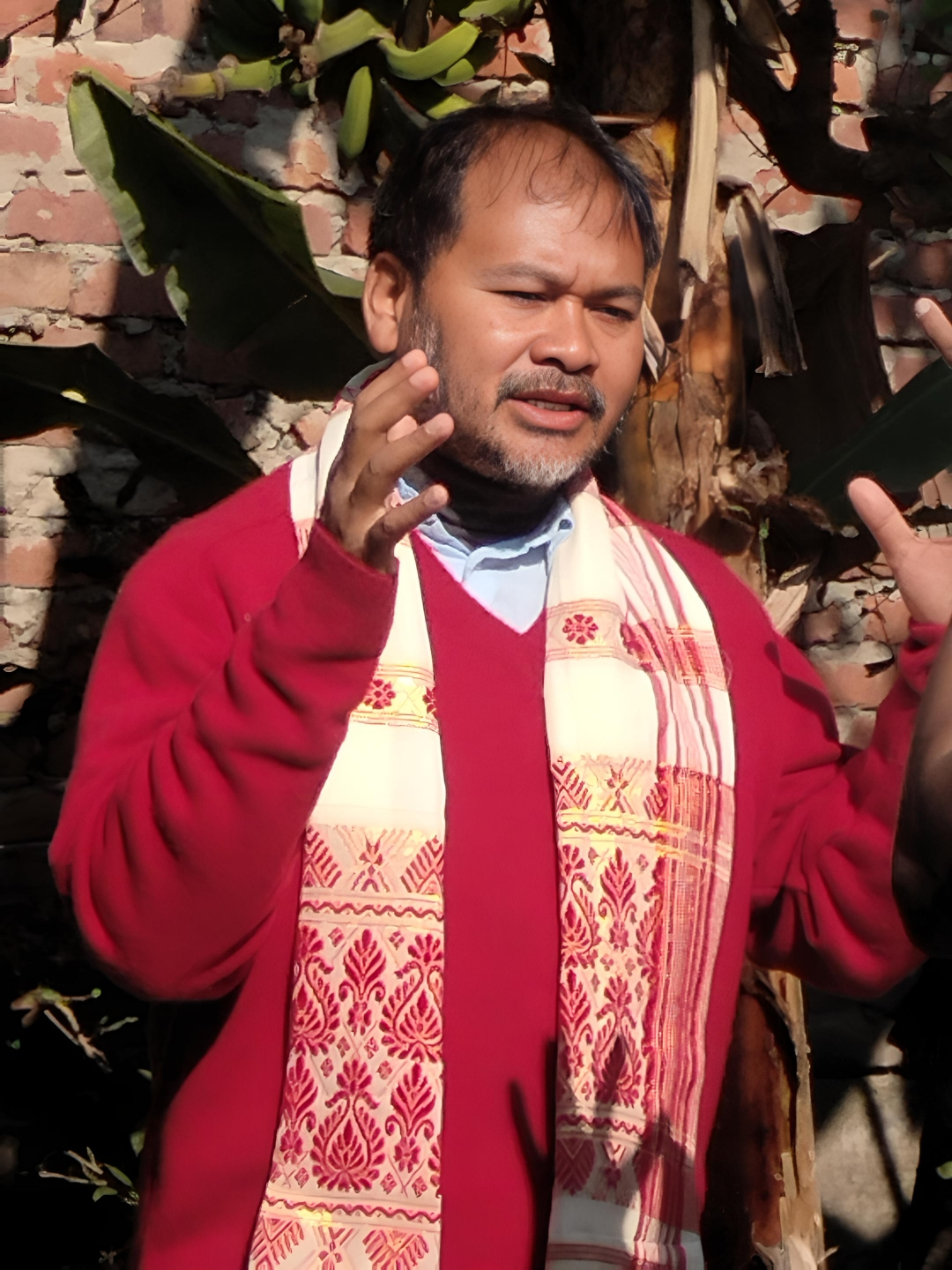
- Gogoi in 2024

Member of Assam Legislative Assembly
- Incumbent
- Assumed office 21 May 2021
- Preceded by: Pranab Gogoi
- Constituency: Sibsagar

Founder and President of Raijor Dal
- Incumbent
- Assumed office 2 October 2020
- Preceded by: Post Established
- Occupation: Member of Assam Legislative Assembly
- Organisation(s): Krishak Mukti Sangram Samiti; India Against Corruption
- Known for: 2011–12 Indian anti-corruption movement, Right to Information, Anti CAA Protests of 2019 in Assam
- Political party: Raijor Dal, Gana Mukti Sangram Asom
- Movement: Indian anti-corruption movement
- Spouse: Geetashree Tamuly
- Children: 1

Akhil Gogoi is an Indian peasant leader, politician, and member of the Assam Legislative Assembly from Sibsagar since 2021. He is also the founder and president of Raijor Dal since 2020. Over the years he has led many anti-graft movements in the state. Gogoi came to national attention after he was awarded the Shanmugam Manjunath Integrity Award in 2008 for his relentless fight against corruption. In 2010, he was awarded the national Right to Information Award by Public Cause Research Foundation for his role in exposing a Rs. 12.5 million scam in Sampoorna Gram Rozgar Yojna in the Golaghat district of Assam. Gogoi is the founder Secretary of Krishak Mukti Sangram Samiti (KMSS)- a peasant organisation based in Assam.

== Personal life ==
Akhil was born to Boluram and Priyada Gogoi in Selenghat Village, Jorhat. He attended the Cotton College, Guwahati during 1993–1996, where he studied English literature. He served as the general secretary and magazine secretary of the college students union. Soon he joined the United Revolutionary Movement Council of Assam (URMCA), a mass organisation of CPI-ML-PCC under the leadership of communist leader Santosh Rana. However, by the end of the 1990s he broke with Rana and devoted himself as an editor of Natun Padatik, an independent Marxist journal published in Assamese, along with Hiren Gohain. Gogoi is married to Geetashree Tamuly, with whom he has a son Nachiketa.

== Anti Big-Dam and Land Reclamation Campaign ==
From mid-2009, Gogoi had led a statewide movement against construction of big dams in the ecologically sensitive regions of Assam and Arunachal Pradesh. His organisation KMSS demanded immediate halt to the ongoing construction of the dam of Lower Subansiri, a mega hydroelectric power project under NHPC with an estimated capacity of 2000 MW. In December 2011, huge number of anti-big dam protestors led by Gogoi stopped trucks transporting parts of turbines to the Lower Subansiri Hydro-electric Power Project site in Gerukamukh, Lakhimpur district, thereby significantly slowing down the process of construction of the dam for the next many years. The dam is still not complete. In 2014 Gogoi initiated a campaign against land mafia in Assam, who had appropriated thousand of acres of agricultural land in rural Kamrup district, adjoining Guwahati city, from poor farmers. The matter is currently under investigation.

== Campaign against corruption ==
For some time, he was also associated with Anna Hazare led anti-graft campaign India against Corruption (IAC). However, he broke with IAC after some of the members decided to form a political party. Explaining his reasons to resign from IAC, Gogoi said that the support IAC had received was only for building up a strong and sustained mass movement against rampant corruption, and not floating an election centred political party.

== Peasant cooperatives ==
In 2013, Gogoi and his comrades in KMSS established a number of provisional retail outlets in different parts of Guwahati city to facilitate direct access of rural peasantry with urban markets. Claiming it as an alternative to FDI in Retail as well as mafia-run-syndicates, Gogoi and his organisation expressed their plans to open more outlets in the city on a permanent basis. These outlets will be run by the peasants themselves and will sell agrarian products on a drastically lower price, removing the middleman in between. On the very first day of the opening of the outlets, more than hundred quintals of vegetables were reported to be sold within a few hours.

== Maoist controversy and imprisonment ==
In April 2010, a secret report of the Assam government alleged that Akhil Gogoi had close connections with CPI-Maoist. Gogoi challenged the report and dared the Assam government to prove the allegation. Intellectuals across the country including Magsaysay Award Winner Sandeep Pandey and Medha Patkar condemned the government for trying to implicate the activist. In an interview with NDTV, Akhil Gogoi said, "I am a Marxist and I do believe in social transformation. But I am not a Maoist. They don't believe in mass activities. We at KMSS are trying to organise the masses for radical change. But the attempt of the government to implicate me as a Maoist shows their frustration because they have been unable to contain the growing popularity of KMSS". It created embarrassment for the Assam government and the matter was dropped thereafter. The same allegation was again raised in 2019, this time by the BJP led government of Assam, in the context of the Citizenship Amendment Act Protests being led by Mr Gogoi. Akhil Gogoi was arrested on 12 December 2019. Two UAPA cases were slapped on Akhil Gogoi and the National Investigation Agency was entrusted with the investigation. NIA alleged that the Citizenship Amendment Act Protests in the state reeks of a Maoist conspiracy and it is likely that Mr Gogoi received training from the CPI-Maoist, in leading such a militant mass movement. On 1 July 2021, the NIA Court absolved Akhil Gogoi of all charges and quashed both the UAPA Cases after an incarceration of 567 days.

== Electoral politics ==
From prison, Akhil Gogoi launched his own political outfit Raijor Dal on 2 October 2020. Akhil Gogoi won from the Sivasagar constituency in the Assam Assembly Elections 2021. He received 57219 votes out of the total of 124219 votes defeating nearest candidate Surabhi Rajkonwari of BJP by a margin of 11,875 votes. He became the first Assamese person to get a victory in assembly elections from jail without any campaigning.

== Works for the Assamese culture and nature ==
The Kaziranga National Orchid and Biodiversity Park is the largest orchid garden in India located in Assam. It was launched by the Krishak Mukti Sangram Samiti (KMSS), headed by Gogoi. The orchid park consists of a green house, photo gallery, medicinal herbal plant garden, product outlet corner, fruit garden, flower garden, rock garden, rice museum, fish pond, a nature walk and a special place for practising folk culture.

== See also ==
- Gana Mukti Sangram Asom
- Krishak Mukti Sangram Samiti
- Raijor Dol
