= Promode Gogoi =

Indian politician

Minister for Flood Control and Irrigation (Government of Assam)
- In office 1996 - 2001
- Constituency: Sibsagar

Personal details
- Born: 29 September 1930 Sibsagar, India
- Died: 6 April 2012 (aged 81) Guwahati, India
- Party: Communist Party of India (CPI)
- As of 7 April, 2012 Source: Times of Assam

Promode Chandra Gogoi (29 September 1930 – 6 April 2012) was an Indian politician from the state of Assam. He served as a member of the Legislative Assembly of Assam five terms, and also as the Minister for Flood control & Irrigation of the state from 1996 till 2001.

== Early life ==
Gogoi was born in the Sibsagar district of Upper Assam.

== Political career ==
Promode was associated with the All India Students Federation during his student days. He joined the Communist Party of India (CPI) in 1948 and was elected to the state assembly of Assam from Sibsagar constituency for the first time in 1967.

He was a member of the central secretariat of the CPI and was reappointed to its national executive days before his death at the Patna congress of the party. He was also the President of the All India Trade Union Congress and vice-president of the World Federation of Trade Unions.

== Death ==
After experiencing epistaxis, he was admitted to the Guwahati Neurological Research Centre (GNRC) on 2 April 2012. His condition worsened after he suffered a stroke and he was pronounced dead. He remained a bachelor and was survived by granddaughter Purabi Gogoi, a civil servant.
