= Assam =

State in Northeast India

- State
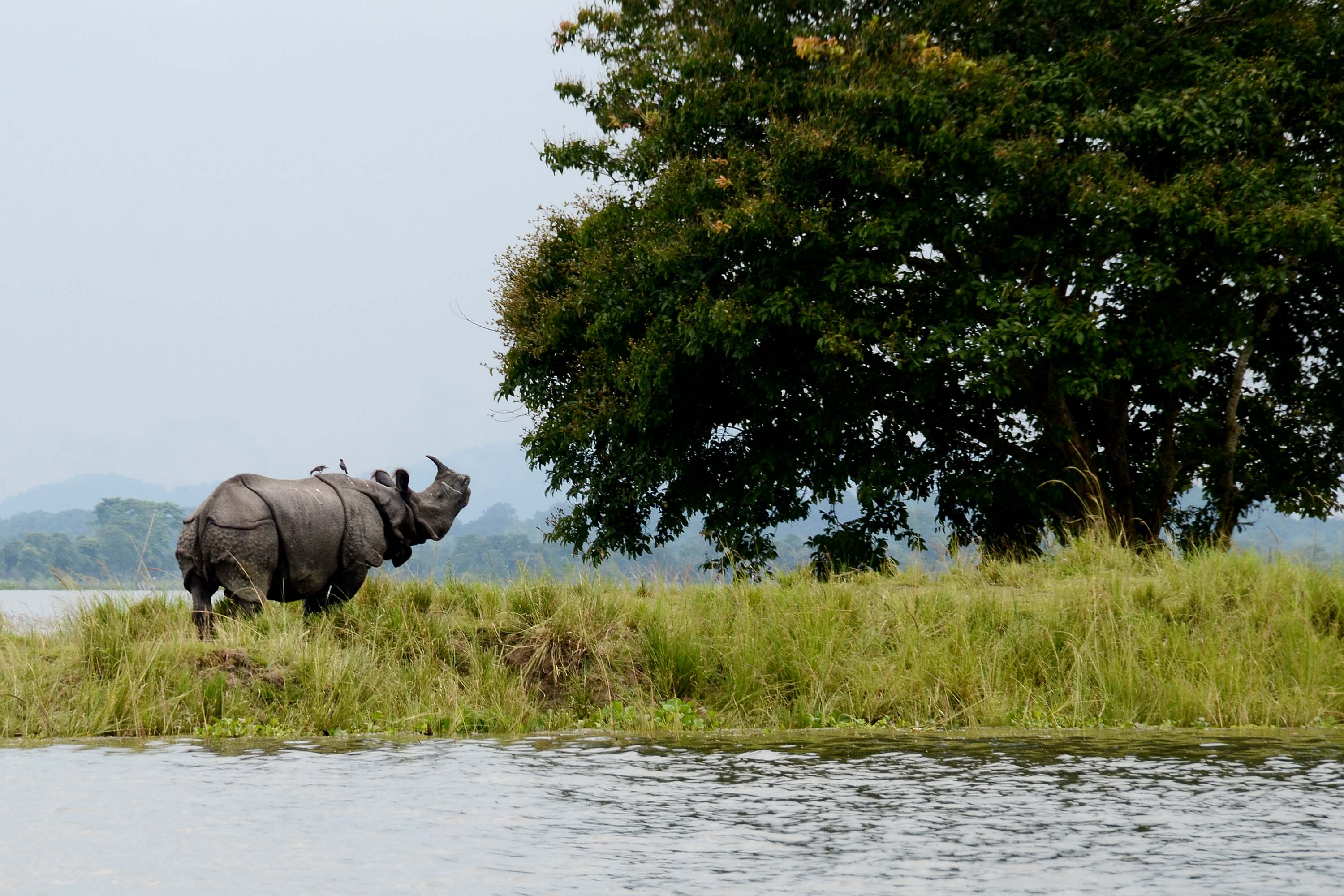
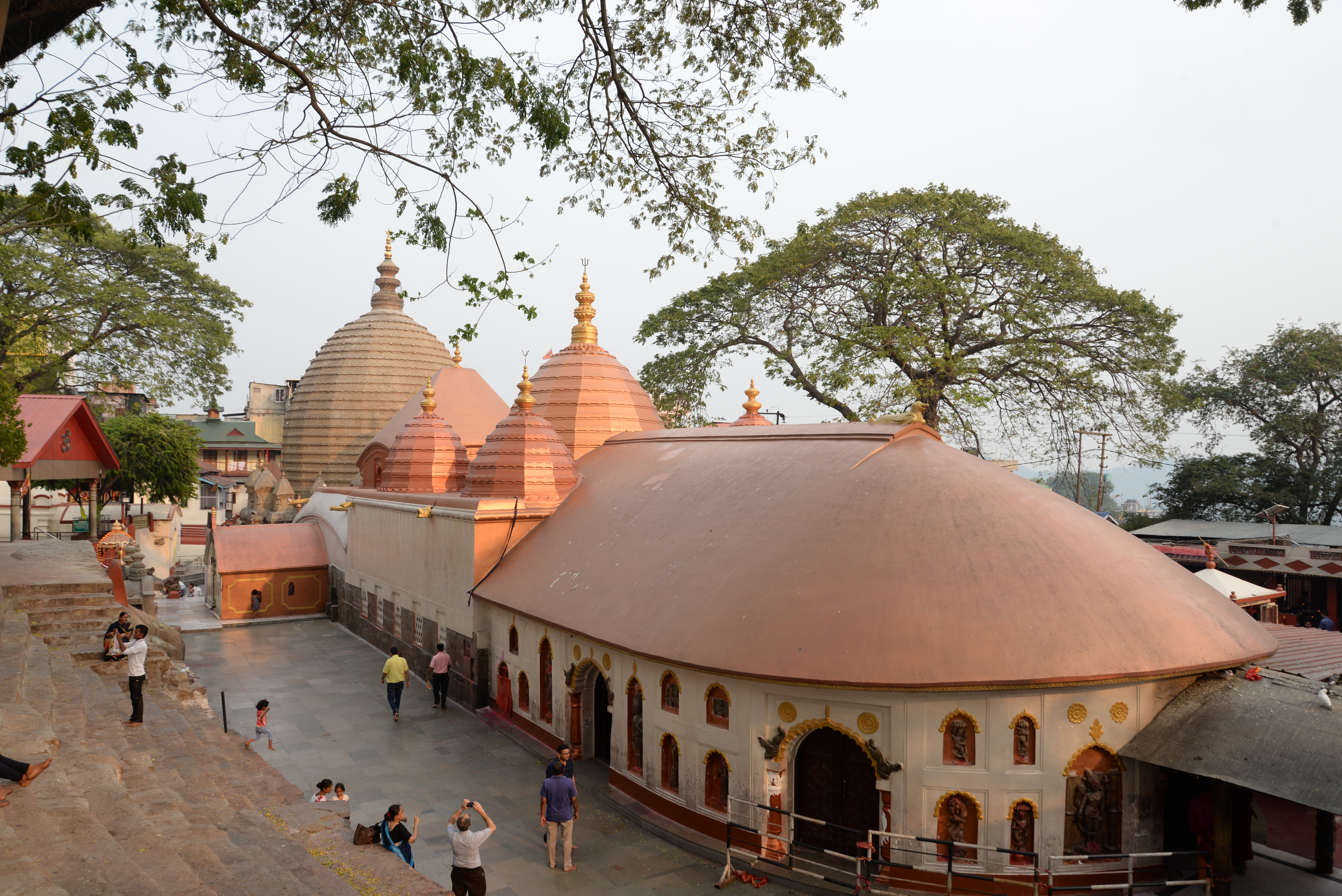
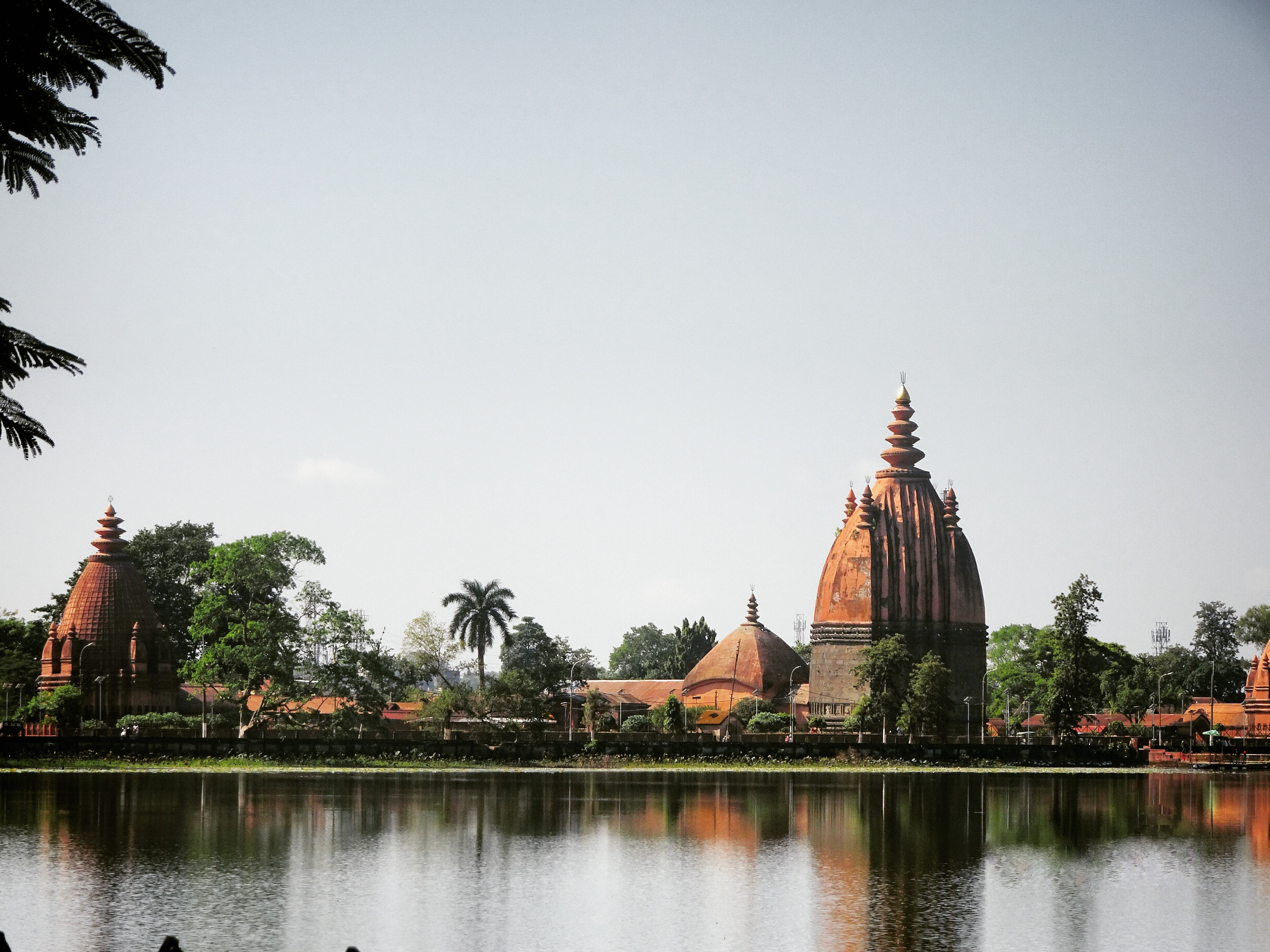
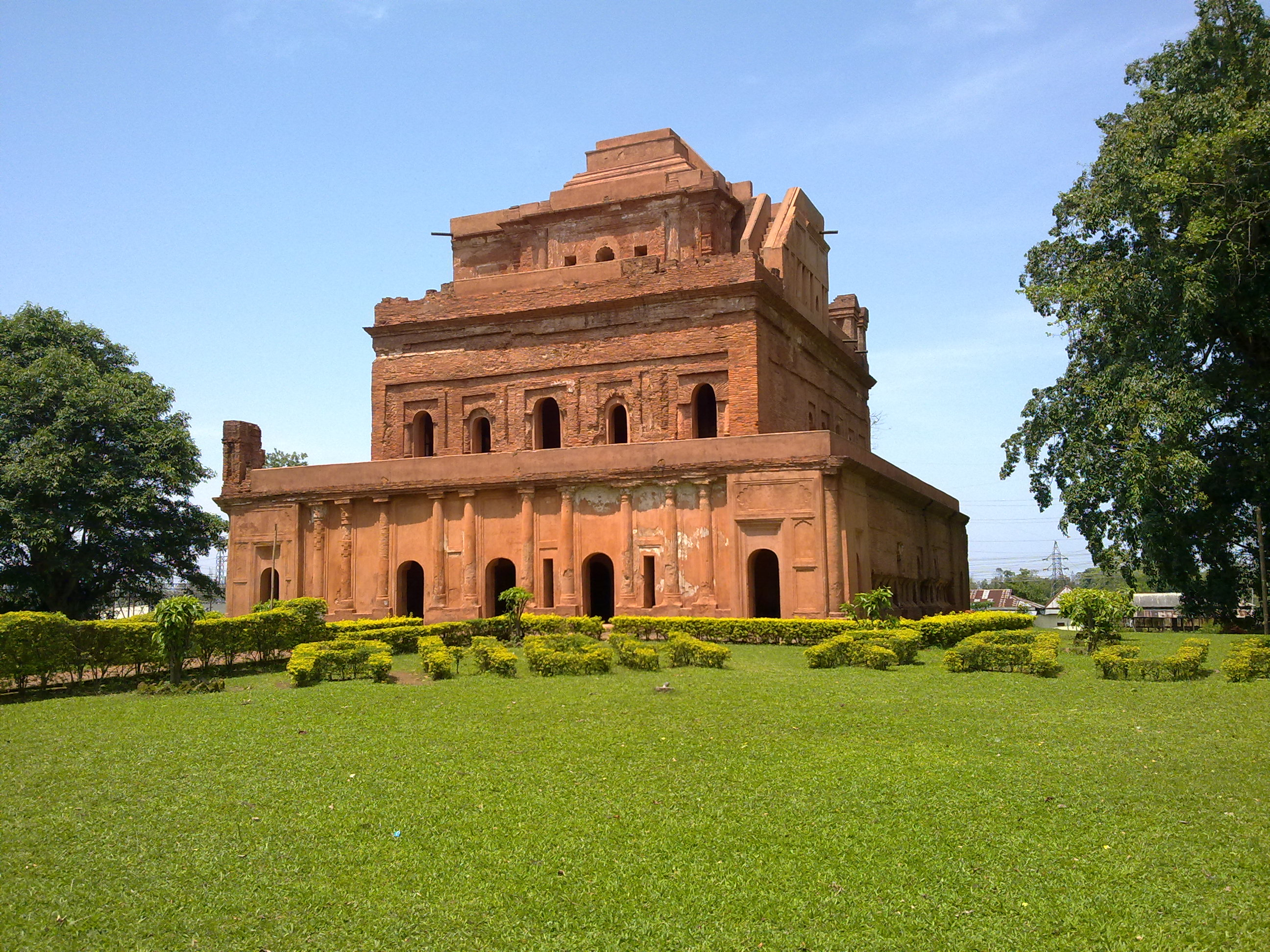
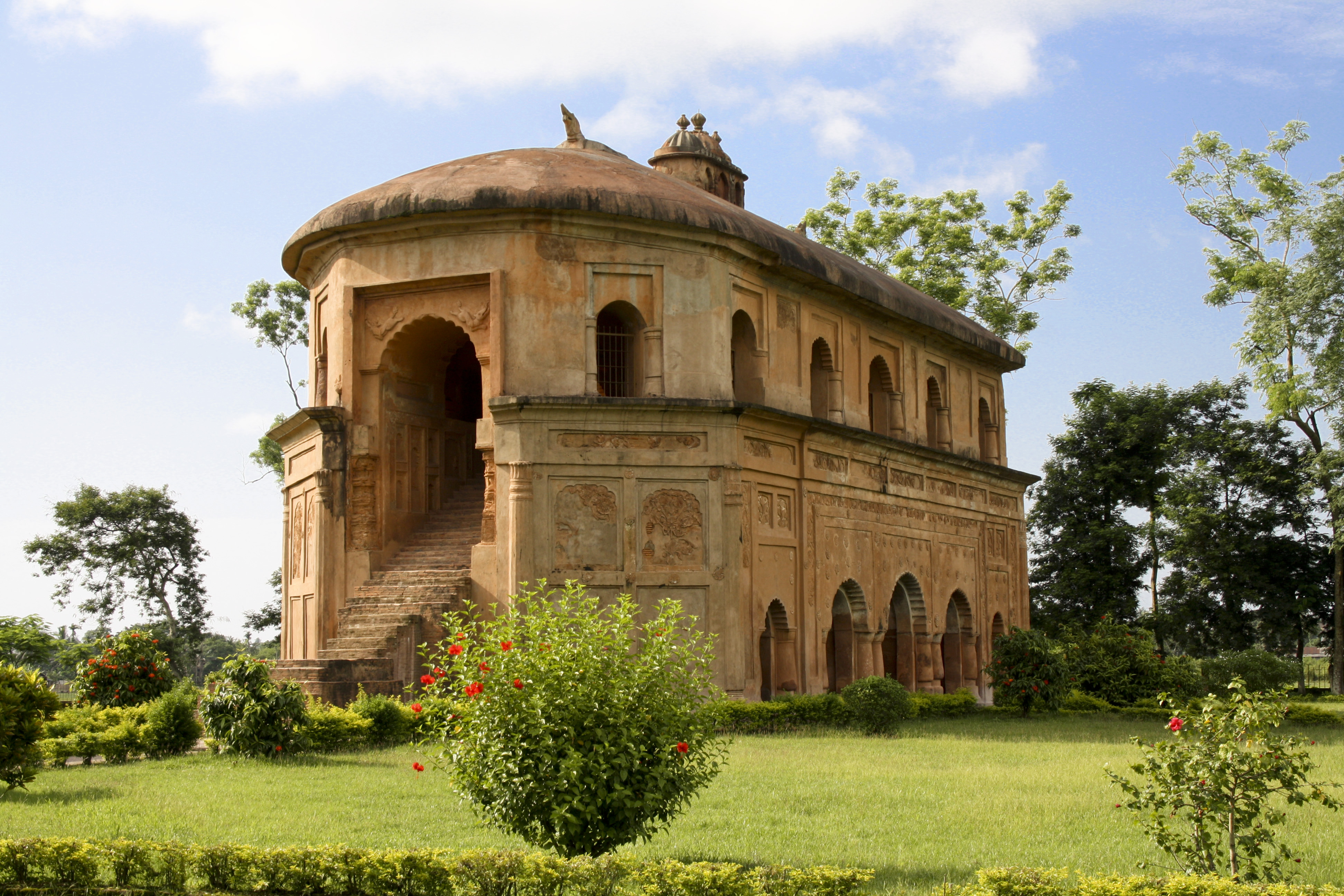
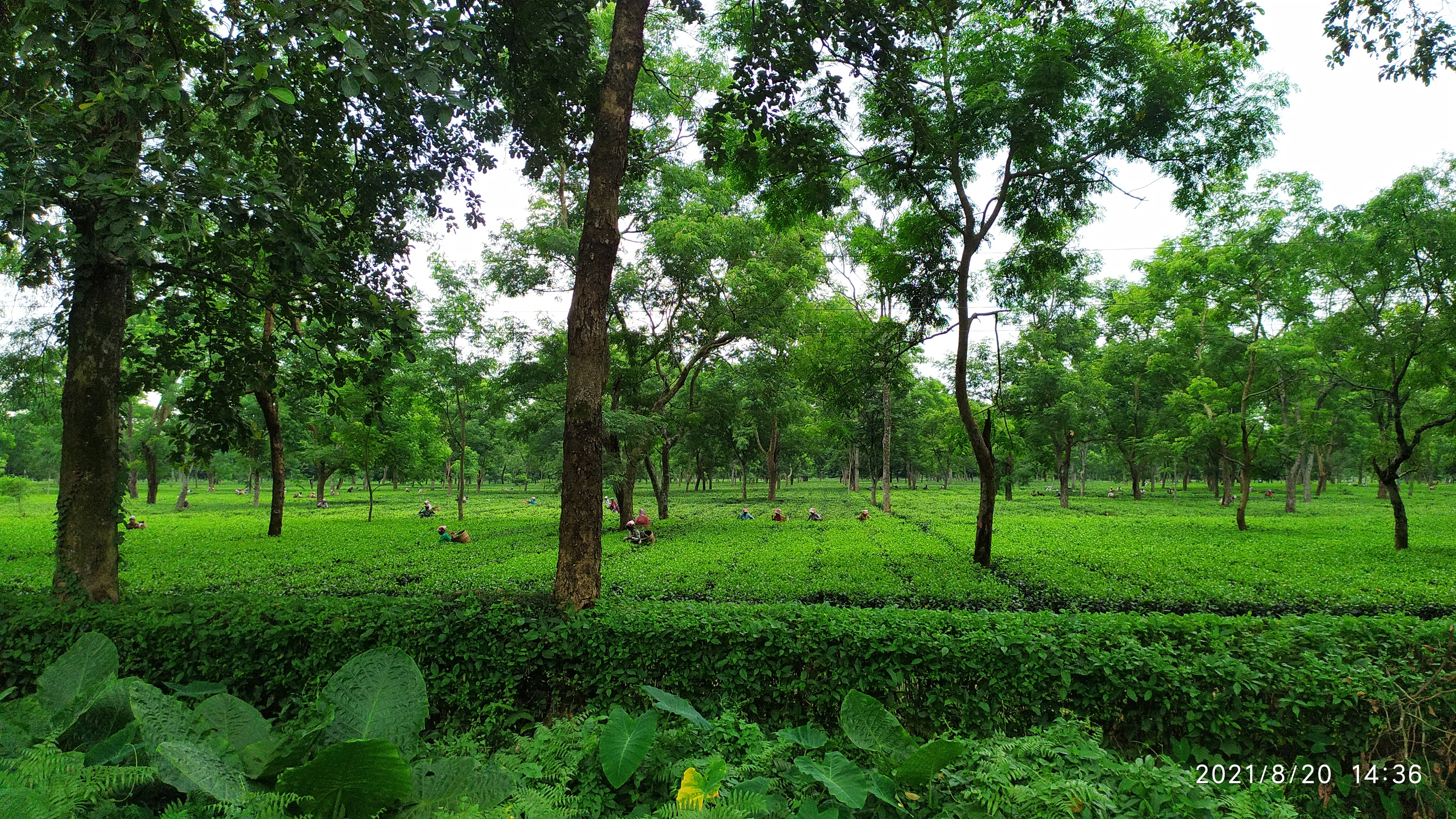
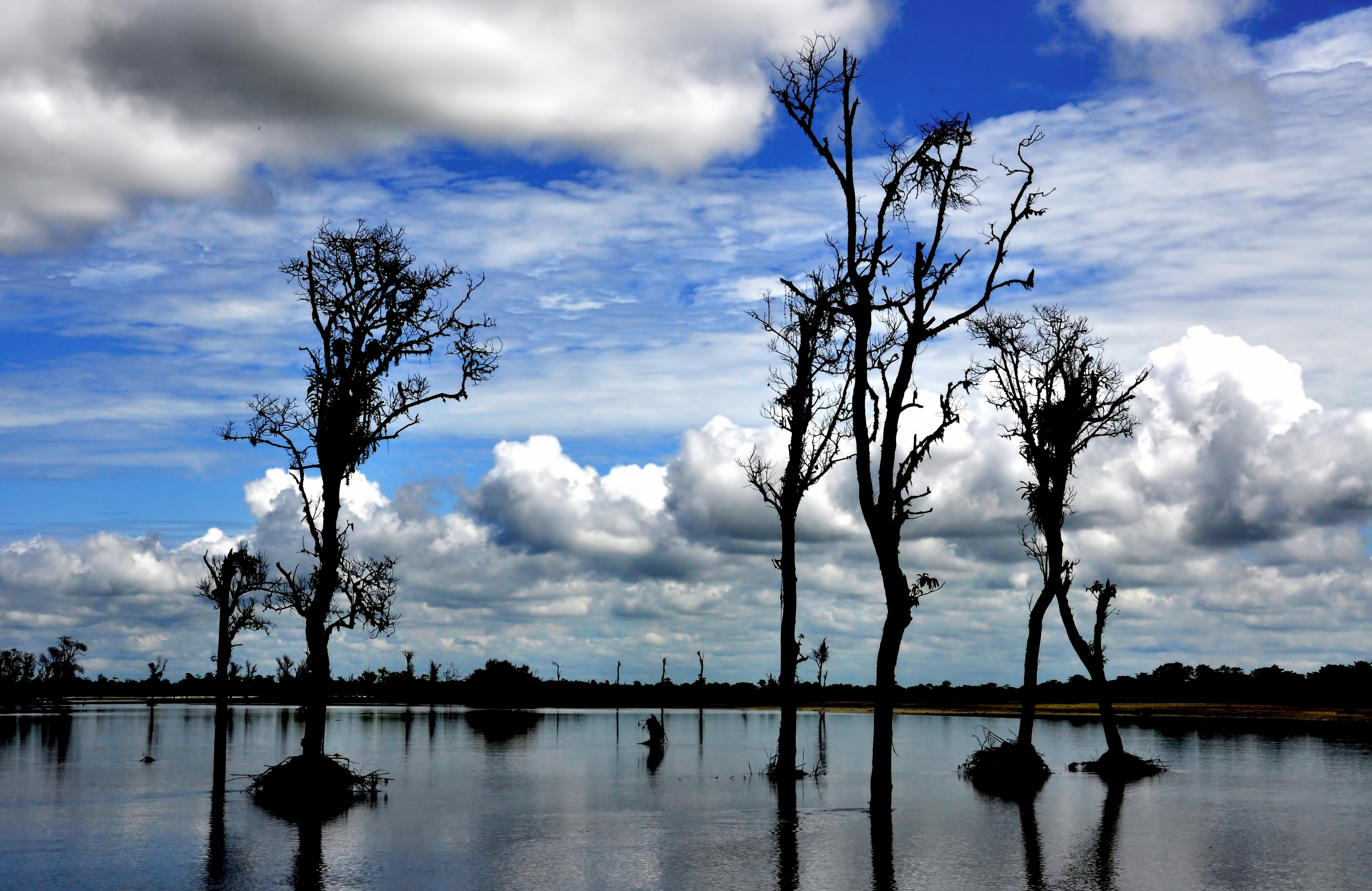
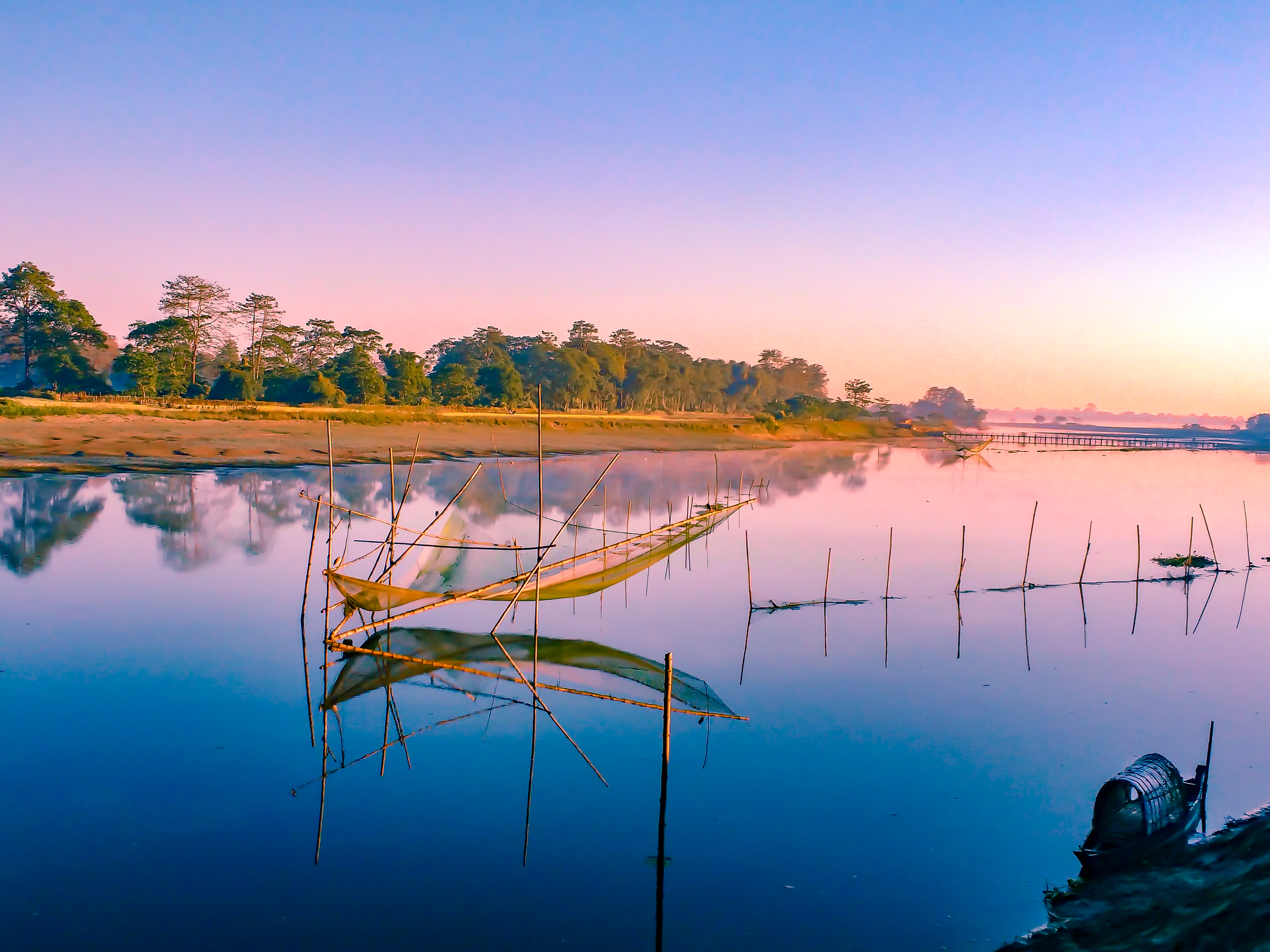
- Indian Rhinoceros in Kaziranga National Park Kamakhya Temple Shivsagar Temples Kareng Ghar Rang Ghar Assam Tea Garden Dibru-Saikhowa National Park Majuli Island

- Emblem of Assam
- Etymology: Ahom kingdom
- Nickname: "Land of red river and blue hills"
- Motto: Satyameva Jayate (Sanskrit) "Truth Alone Triumphs"
- Anthem: O Mur Apunar Desh (Assamese) "O My Dearest Country"
- Location of Assam in India
- Coordinates: 26.14°N 91.77°E
- Country: India
- Region: Northeast India
- Previously was: State of Assam
- Bifurcation: 21 January 1972
- Formation: 26 January 1950
- Capital: Dispur
- Largest city: Guwahati
- Districts: 35 (5 divisions)

Government
  - Body: Government of Assam
  - Governor: Lakshman Acharya
  - Chief Minister: Himanta Biswa Sarma (BJP)

Area
  - Total: 78,438 km^{2} (30,285 sq mi)
  - Rank: 16th

Dimensions
  - Length: 725 km (450 mi)
  - Width: 30 km (19 mi)
- Highest elevation (Unnamed peak in Barail Range, Dima Hasao): 1,960 m (6,430 ft)
- Lowest elevation (Brahmaputra River): 45 m (148 ft)

Population (2011)
  - Total: 31,205,576
  - Rank: 15th
  - Density: 465.25/km^{2} (1,205.0/sq mi)
  - Urban: 15.8%
  - Rural: 84.2%
- Demonym: Assamese

Language
  - Official: Assamese • Boro • Bengali (Barak Valley) • Meitei (Barak Valley (Note: Barak Valley has three districts. In all the three districts, Meitei language (alias Manipuri language) serves as an official language, besides Bengali language.) and Hojai district)
  - Official script: Bengali–Assamese script (for Assamese & Bengali) • Devanagari (for Bodo) • Meitei script (for Meitei)

GDP
  - Total (2026-27): ▲₹871,451 crore (US$90 billion); ~$425 billion (PPP)
  - Rank: 17th
  - Per capita: ▲₹203,760 (US$2,100)(nominal); ~$10,000 (PPP) (2025-26 FY) (18th)
- Time zone: UTC+05:30 (IST)
- ISO 3166 code: IN-AS
- Vehicle registration: AS
- HDI (2023): ▲0.655 Medium (31st)
- Literacy (2024): 87.0% (15th)
- Sex ratio (2025): 934 (12th)
- Website: assam.gov.in
- Symbols of Assam
- Foundation day: Asom Diwas
- Bird: White-winged duck
- Flower: Foxtail orchid
- Fruit: Kaji Nemu
- Mammal: Indian rhinoceros
- Tree: Hollong
- State highway mark
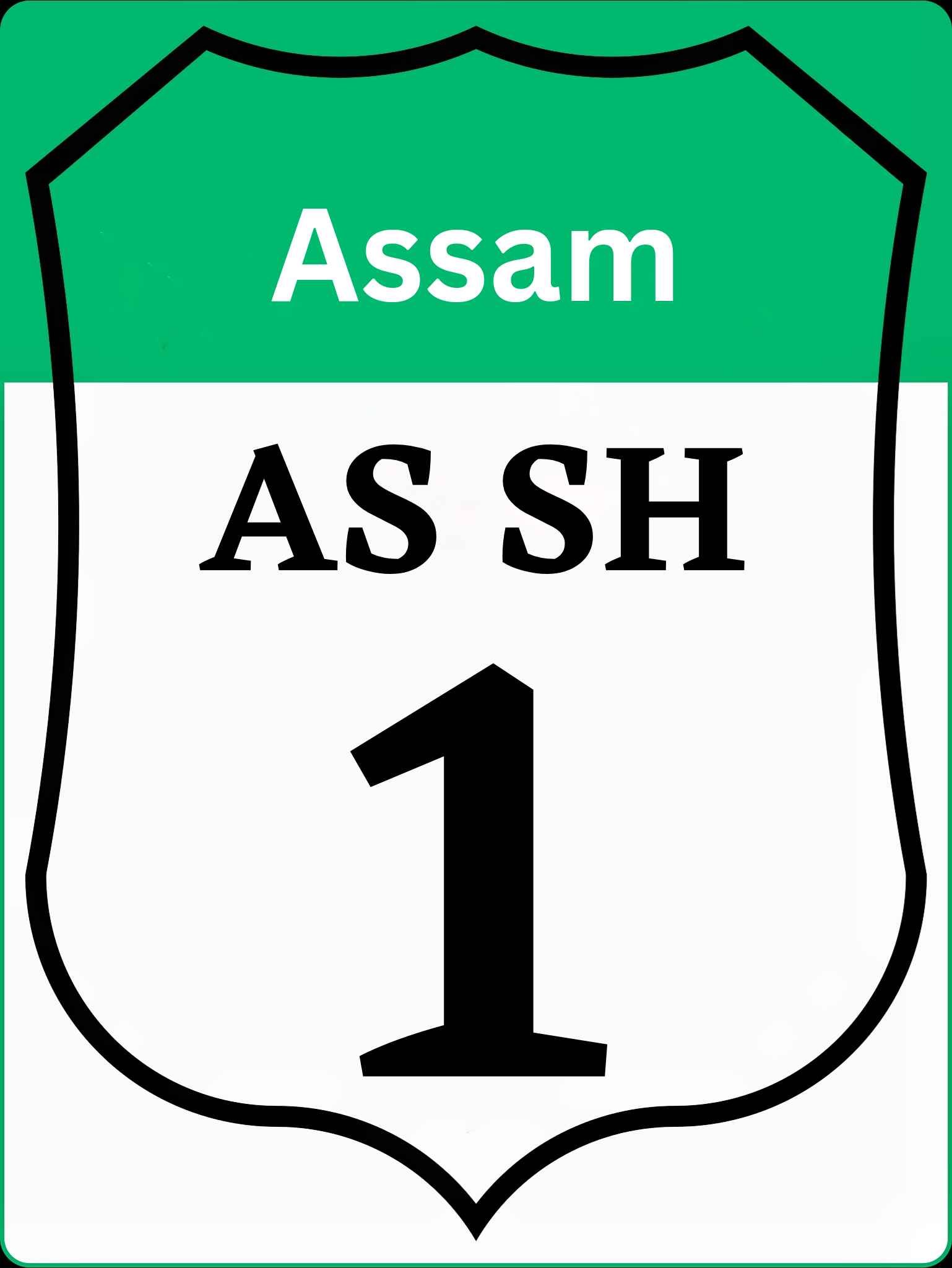
- State highway of Assam; AS SH1 -AS SH48
- List of Indian state symbols
- • First recognised as an administrative division on 1 April 1912, after the establishment of Assam Province by partitioning Province of East Bengal and Assam. • Became Assam Province under Independent India on 15 August 1947, and was recognised as a state after India became a republic on 26 January 1950 • Assam has had a legislature since 1937.

Assam (Note: /əˈsɑːm/ ə-SAHM; Assamese: oxom, pronounced [ɔˈxɔm]) is a state in Northeast India, located south of the Eastern Himalayas along the Brahmaputra Valley and Barak River valleys. It covers an area of 78,438 km^{2} (30,285 sq mi), and is the second largest state in northeastern India by area. As per the 2011 census, the state had a population of 31.2 million, and is the largest by population in the Northeast India region. It shares international borders with Bhutan to the north and with Bangladesh to the southwest. It borders the Indian states of Arunachal Pradesh to the north; Nagaland and Manipur to the east; Meghalaya, Tripura, and Mizoram to the south; and West Bengal to the west. It is connected to the rest of the India to the west via the Siliguri Corridor (also known as the chicken neck), a 22 km (14 mi) wide strip of land. Dispur is the capital of Assam while Dibrugarh is the second capital. Guwahati is the largest city and urban area in the state.

Archaeological record from the region indicate early settlements from the second to first century BCE. Though the region finds mention in the Hindu epic Mahabharata, there is a lack of substantial archaeological evidence regarding its ancient history. The region is described as one of the frontiers of the Gupta Empire in fourth century CE. It was ruled by Varmanas (c. 350–650 CE), Mlechchhas (c. 655–900 CE) and Kamarupa-Palas (c. 900–1100 CE) later. The Ahom kingdom was established in the 13th century CE, and ruled till the early 19th century CE. The period saw various conflicts with the Mughals. After the Moamoria rebellion and Burmese invasions weakened the Ahom kingdom, the British started establishing tea estates in the region in the 19th century CE. The region became part of the Bengal Presidency, and the Assam Province was established in 1912. The Assam Legislative Assembly was formed in 1937. The province became part of Independent India on 15 August 1947, and was recognised as a state after India became a republic on 26 January 1950.

The state is organised into 35 districts across five divisions. Assamese and Bodo are the official languages of the state with Meitei recognised as an additional official language in three districts of the Barak Valley and Hojai district, and Bengali in the Barak Valley. The state is known for its namesake Assam silk and Assam tea. Wildlife tourism is a major contributor to the economy of the state, aided by the presence of various protected areas including the Kaziranga and Manas National Parks, which are World Heritage Sites. More than half of the extant wild population of the one-horned Indian rhinoceros occurs in the state. The state is a rich biodiversity zone consisting of various ecosystems including tropical rainforests, deciduous forests, riverine grasslands, orchards, and wetlands. It receives copious amount of rainfall, which feeds the Brahmaputra River system, whose tributaries and oxbow lakes form a distinctive hydro-geomorphic environment.

== Etymology ==
The first dated mention of the region comes from Periplus of the Erythraean Sea (1st century) and Ptolemy's Geographia (2nd century), which calls the region Kirrhadia, apparently after the Kirata population. In the classical period and up to the 12th century, the region east of the Karatoya River, largely congruent to present-day Assam, was called Kamarupa, and alternatively, Pragjyotisha. Though a western portion of Assam as a region continued to be called Kamrup, the Ahom kingdom that emerged in the east, and which came to dominate much of the Brahmaputra Valley, was called Assam (e.g. Mughals used Asham); and the British province too was called Assam. Though the precise etymology of Assam is not clear, the name Assam, first used by the British in the Treaty of Yandabo in 1826, is associated with the Ahom people, originally called Shyam (Shan).

== History ==
=== Pre-history ===
Assam and adjoining regions have evidences of human settlement from the beginning of the Stone Age. The hills at the height of 1,500 to 2,000 feet (460–615 m) were popular habitats probably due to availability of exposed dolerite basalt, useful for tool-making. Ambari site in Guwahati has revealed Shunga-Kushana era artefacts including flight of stairs and a water tank which may date from 1st century BCE and may be 2,000 years old. Experts speculate that another significant find at Ambari is Roman era Roman roulette pottery from the 2nd century BCE. Gupta explains that while Guwahati, formerly known as Pragjyotishpur in ancient times, is mentioned in epics like the Mahabharata and the Puranas, there is a lack of substantial archaeological evidence regarding its ancient history, especially before the 7th century AD.

=== Legend ===
According to a late text, Kalika Purana (c. 9th–10th century CE), the earliest ruler of Assam was Mahiranga Danava of the Danava dynasty, which was removed by Narakasura of Mithila and established the Bhauma dynasty. The last of these rulers, also Narakasura, was slain by Krishna. Naraksura's son Bhagadatta became the king, who (it is mentioned in the Mahabharata) fought for the Kauravas in the battle of Kurukshetra with an army of kiratas, chinas and dwellers of the eastern coast. At the same time towards the east in central Assam, Asura kingdom was ruled by another line of kings.

=== Ancient era ===
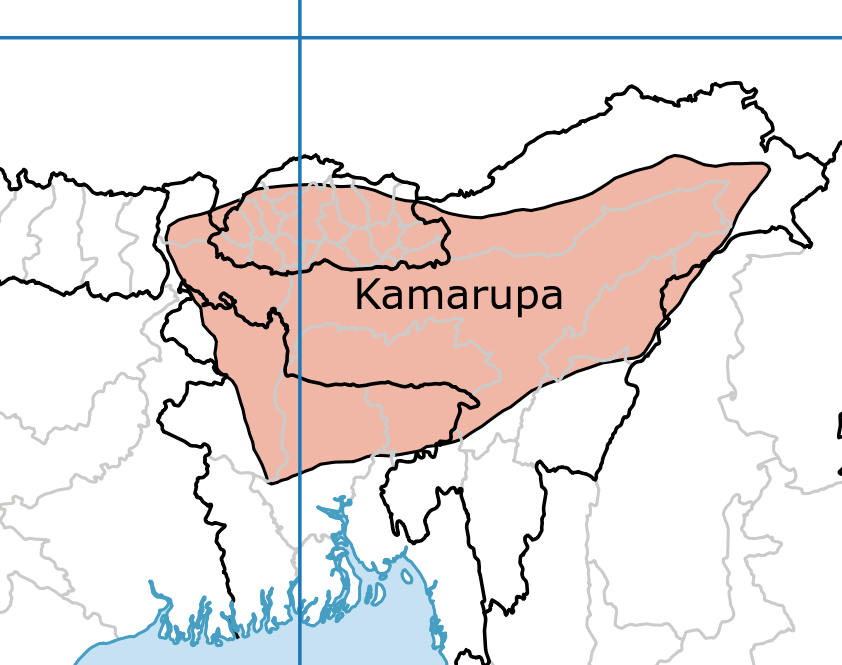
Kamarupa kingdom at its height

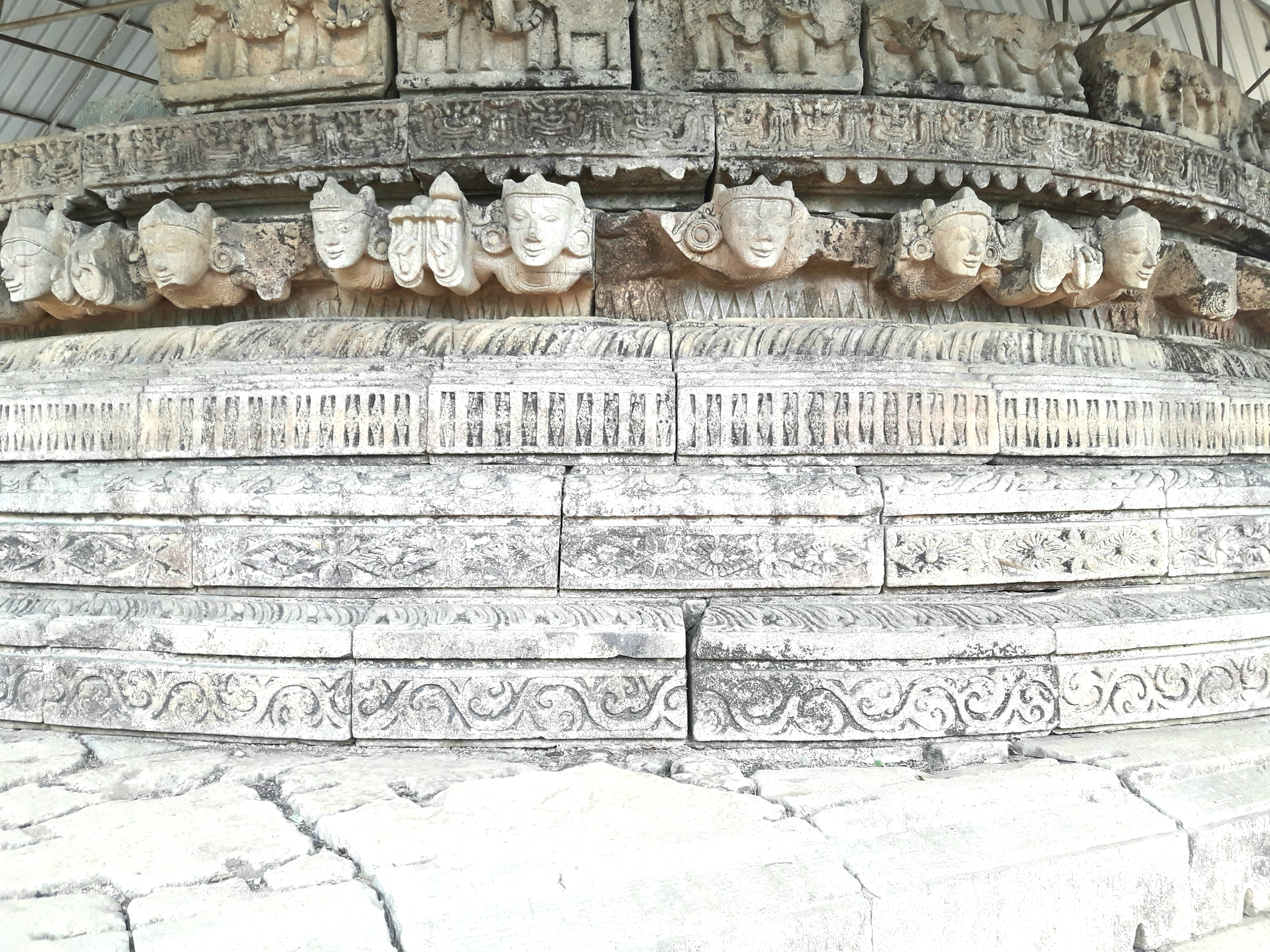
Deopahar ruins

Evidence indicates presence of civilisation in Assam around 2nd century BCE, a rock cut stupa at Sri Surya Pahar has been dated to 200 BCE contemporary with rock cut Karle and Bhaja caves of Maharashtra. The site is located in a hilly terrain where several rock-cut shivalingas, votive stupas and the deities of Hindu, Buddhist and Jain pantheon are scattered.

Samudragupta's 4th-century-CE Allahabad pillar inscription mentions Kamarupa and Davaka in central Assam as frontier kingdoms of the Gupta Empire. Davaka was later absorbed by Kamarupa, which grew into a large kingdom that spanned from Karatoya River to near present Sadiya and covered the entire Brahmaputra Valley, North Bengal, parts of Bangladesh and, at times Purnea and parts of West Bengal. The kingdom was ruled by three dynasties who traced their lineage from a mleccha or Kirata Naraka; the Varmanas (c. 350–650 CE), the Mlechchha dynasty (c.655–900 CE) and the Kamarupa-Palas (c. 900–1100 CE). In the reign of the Varman king, Bhaskaravarman (c. 600–650 CE), the Chinese traveller Xuanzang visited the region and recorded his travels. Later, after weakening and disintegration (after the Kamarupa-Palas), the Kamarupa tradition was extended to c. 1255 CE by the Lunar I (c. 1120–1185 CE) and Lunar II (c. 1155–1255 CE) dynasties.

=== Medieval era ===
Following the decline of Kamarupa, political authority in the Brahmaputra valley became divided among a number of regional states and chiefly confederacies. The Kamata kingdom emerged in the west, while the Chutia kingdom and Kachari kingdom developed in eastern and southern Assam, respectively; the Baro-Bhuyans controlled several areas of central Assam, and the Ahom kingdom arose in Upper Assam. Over the following centuries, these states competed for territory and political supremacy, while the region also experienced repeated interventions from the Bengal Sultanate and, later, the Mughal Empire. In the early 19th century, the Burmese invaded the region, which led to its annexation.

==== Chutia kingdom ====
The Chutia kingdom, ruled by Chutia people of Bodo-Kachari origin, was the principal state of eastern Assam. Its territories extended on both banks of the Brahmaputra, broadly eastwards from Vishwanath on the north bank and the Buridihing on the south, and included adjoining areas of present-day Arunachal Pradesh. Sadiya formed its principal political and religious centre, while Habung was among its western dependencies before the Ahom expansion.

Competition with the expanding Ahom kingdom intensified in the early 16th century and resulted in the Chutia-Ahom conflicts. After a series of campaigns between 1512 and 1523–24, the Chutia royal state was defeated and its principal territories were incorporated into the Ahom kingdom. Chutia nobles, soldiers, artisans and administrative elements were subsequently absorbed into the expanding Ahom state, although armed Chutia resistance continued intermittently after the conquest.

==== Kamata kingdom ====
The Kamata kingdom emerged in the western part of the former Kamarupa kingdom during the 13th century, with its political centre eventually shifting to Kamatapur. Its last major ruling house, the Khen dynasty, was overthrown in 1498 by Alauddin Hussain Shah of Bengal, though Bengal's control over the region proved short-lived. In the early 16th century, Biswa Singha consolidated Koch power (another Bodo-Kachari group) and established the Koch dynasty in the former Kamata domain. Under Nara Narayan and his brother Chilarai, the Koch kingdom became one of the principal powers of the region. It later divided into the western Koch Bihar and eastern Koch Hajo, whose subsequent struggles with the Mughals and the Ahoms shaped the politics of western Assam in the 17th century.

==== Kachari kingdom ====
The Dimasa or Kachari kingdom was another major Bodo-Kachari state that ruled from the 13th century until 1854, with an early political centre at Dimapur. Its sphere of influence extended across the Dikhou, Doyang-Dhansiri and Kapili valley, including parts of central and southern Assam, and its relations with the Ahoms alternated between conflict, tributary arrangements and political accommodation.

During the reign of Suhungmung, Ahom expansion into the Dikhou-Dhansiri region led to repeated warfare with the Kacharis, culminating in the capture of Dimapur in the 16th century. The Dimasa rulers subsequently shifted their political centre southwards to Maibang in the North Cachar Hills and later to Khaspur (after a marriage alliance with the Khaspur state), where the kingdom continued to remain an important regional power before its eventual absorption into British territory.

==== Ahom kingdom ====
According to the traditional chronology, the Ahoms, a Tai group, entered the Brahmaputra valley under Sukaphaa in 1228 and established their political centre at Charaideo in 1253. This chronology has, however, been questioned by modern scholarship, which argues, based on Tai and Chinese sources, that the Ahom polity may instead have been founded during the 14th century. For the first three centuries, the polity remained concentrated mainly in the southeastern part of Upper Assam and developed gradually from a relatively small Tai political formation into a territorial state.

The major territorial expansion began under Suhungmung in the early 16th century. The Ahoms annexed the Chutia kingdom, subdued a number of Baro-Bhuyan chiefs, expanded into Kachari territory and extended their authority westwards. These conquests substantially enlarged the kingdom and brought new populations, administrative traditions and specialised occupational groups into the Ahom state.(Baruah 1986:220–234)

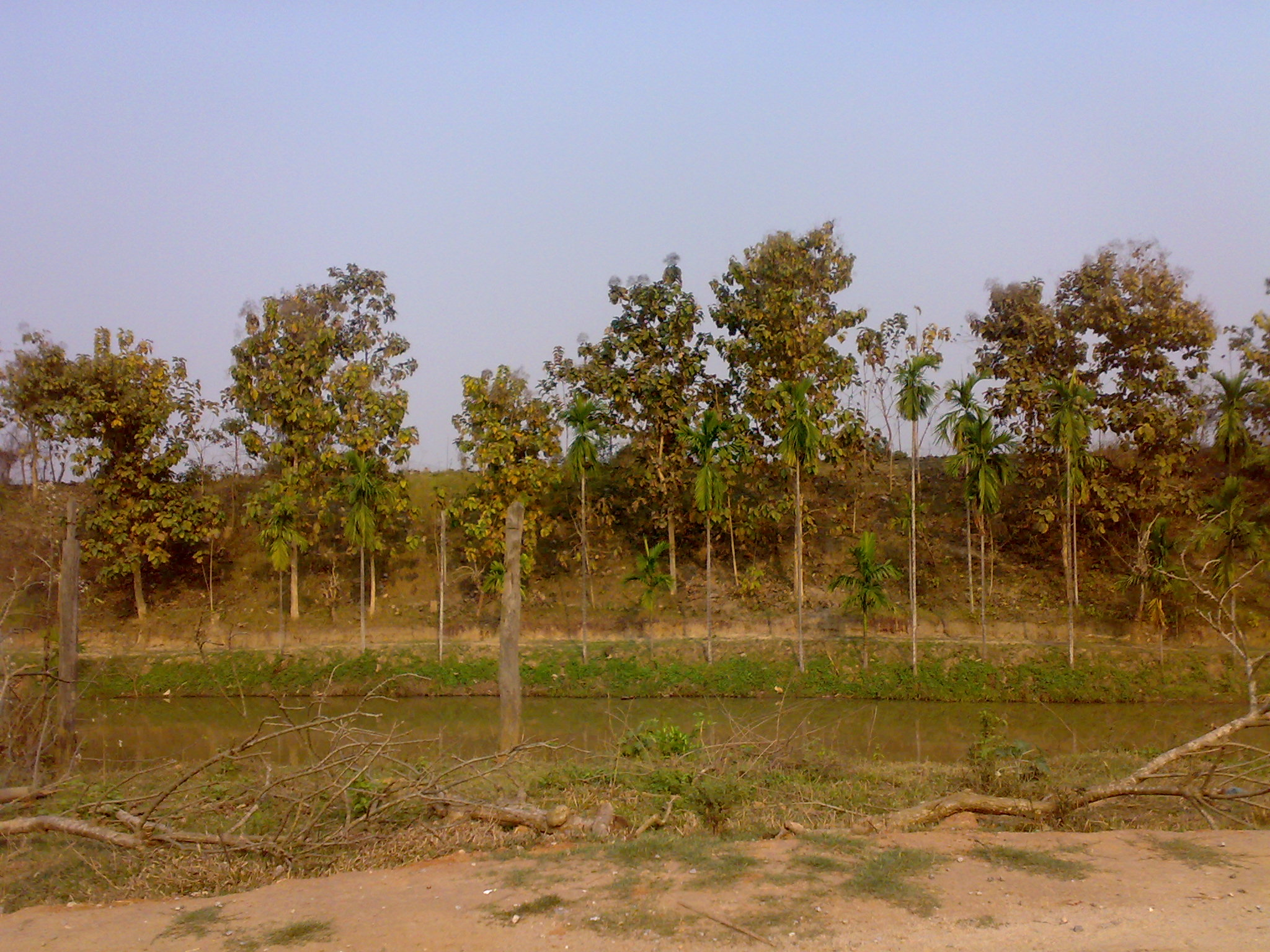
Garchuk Lachit Garh a 17th-century mud fort ruins

In the 17th century, the expansion of the Mughal Empire into former Koch territories brought the Mughals into direct conflict with the Ahoms. The resulting Ahom–Mughal conflicts continued intermittently from 1615 to 1682 and included victories and reverses on both sides. Mir Jumla II occupied Garhgaon in 1662, but the Ahoms recovered Guwahati in 1667, defeated the Mughal forces at the Battle of Saraighat in 1671, and finally expelled them from Guwahati at the Battle of Itakhuli in 1682. The Manas River thereafter became the effective western boundary between the Ahom and Mughal spheres.

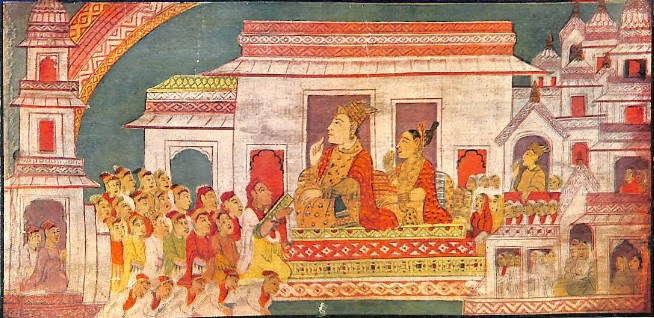
Royal court of Siva Singha and Ambika by Badha Ligira, c. 1736.

The kingdom reached another period of political and cultural strength under rulers such as Rudra Singha in the late 17th and early 18th centuries. From the late 18th century, however, the prolonged Moamoria rebellion weakened the state, and subsequent factional struggles facilitated the Burmese invasions of Assam. The Burmese occupation ended with the Treaty of Yandabo in 1826, after which the East India Company established control over Assam.(Gogoi 2017:20–26)

=== Colonial era ===
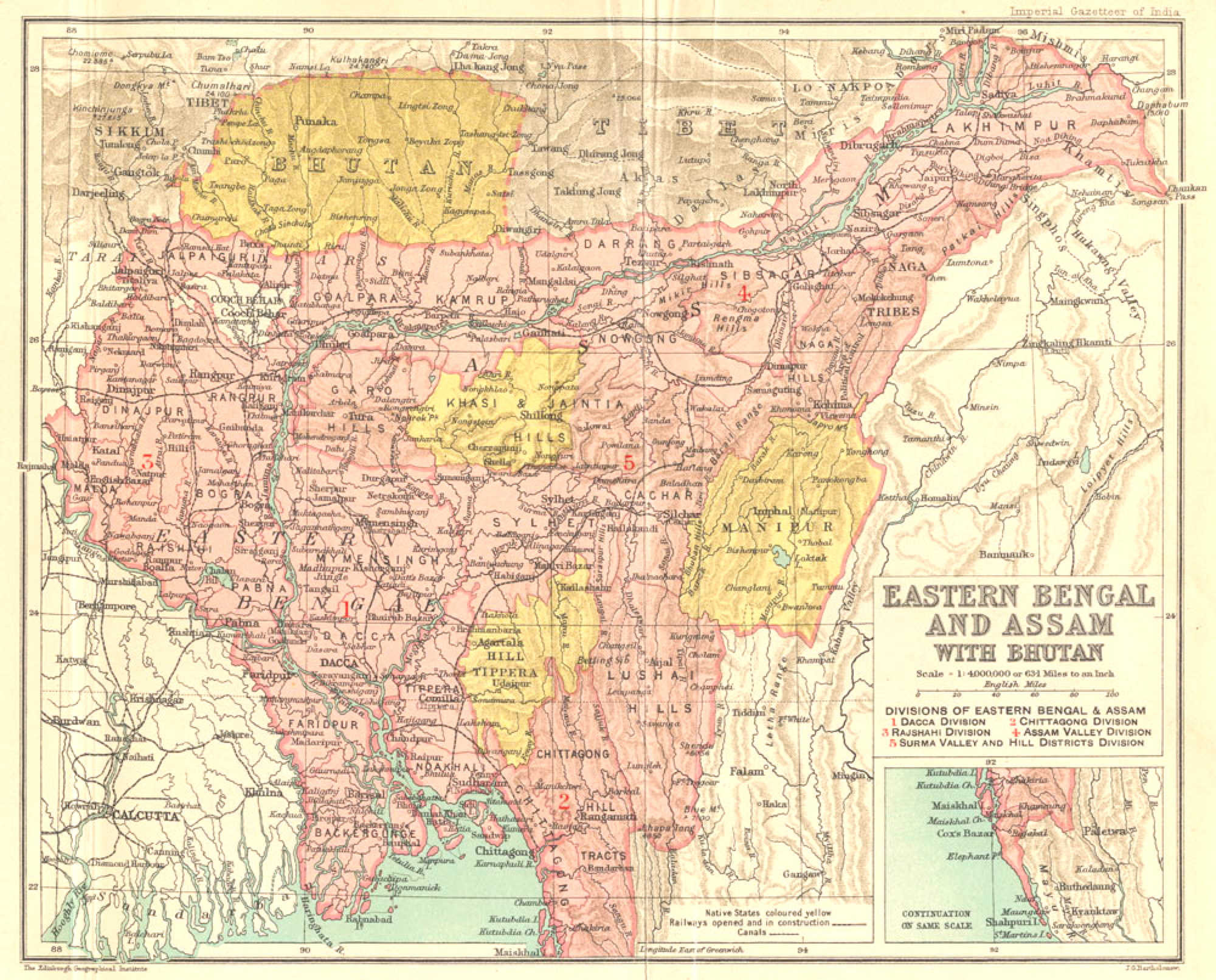
Map of Eastern Bengal and Assam under British rule, 1907–1909.

In the later part of the 18th century, religious tensions and atrocities by the nobles led to the Moamoria rebellion (1769–1805), resulting in high casualties of lives and property. The rebellion was suppressed but the kingdom was severely weakened by the civil war. Political rivalry between Prime Minister Purnananda Burhagohain and Badan Chandra Borphukan, the Ahom Viceroy of Western Assam, led to an invitation to the Burmese by the latter, in turn leading to three successive Burmese invasions of Assam. The reigning monarch Chandrakanta Singha tried to check the Burmese invaders but he was defeated after fierce resistance, which led to the Burmese occupation of Assam.

A reign of terror was unleashed by the Burmese on the Assamese people, who fled to neighbouring kingdoms and British-ruled Bengal. The Burmese reached the East India Company's borders, and the First Anglo-Burmese War ensued in 1824. The war ended under the Treaty of Yandabo in 1826, with the Company taking control of Western Assam and installing Purandar Singha as king of Upper Assam in 1833. The arrangement lasted until 1838 and thereafter the British gradually annexed the entire region. Thereafter the court language and medium of instruction in educational institutions of Assam was made Bengali, instead of Assamese. Starting from 1836 until 1873, this imposition of a foreign tongue created greater unemployment among the People of Assam and Assamese literature naturally suffered in its growth.

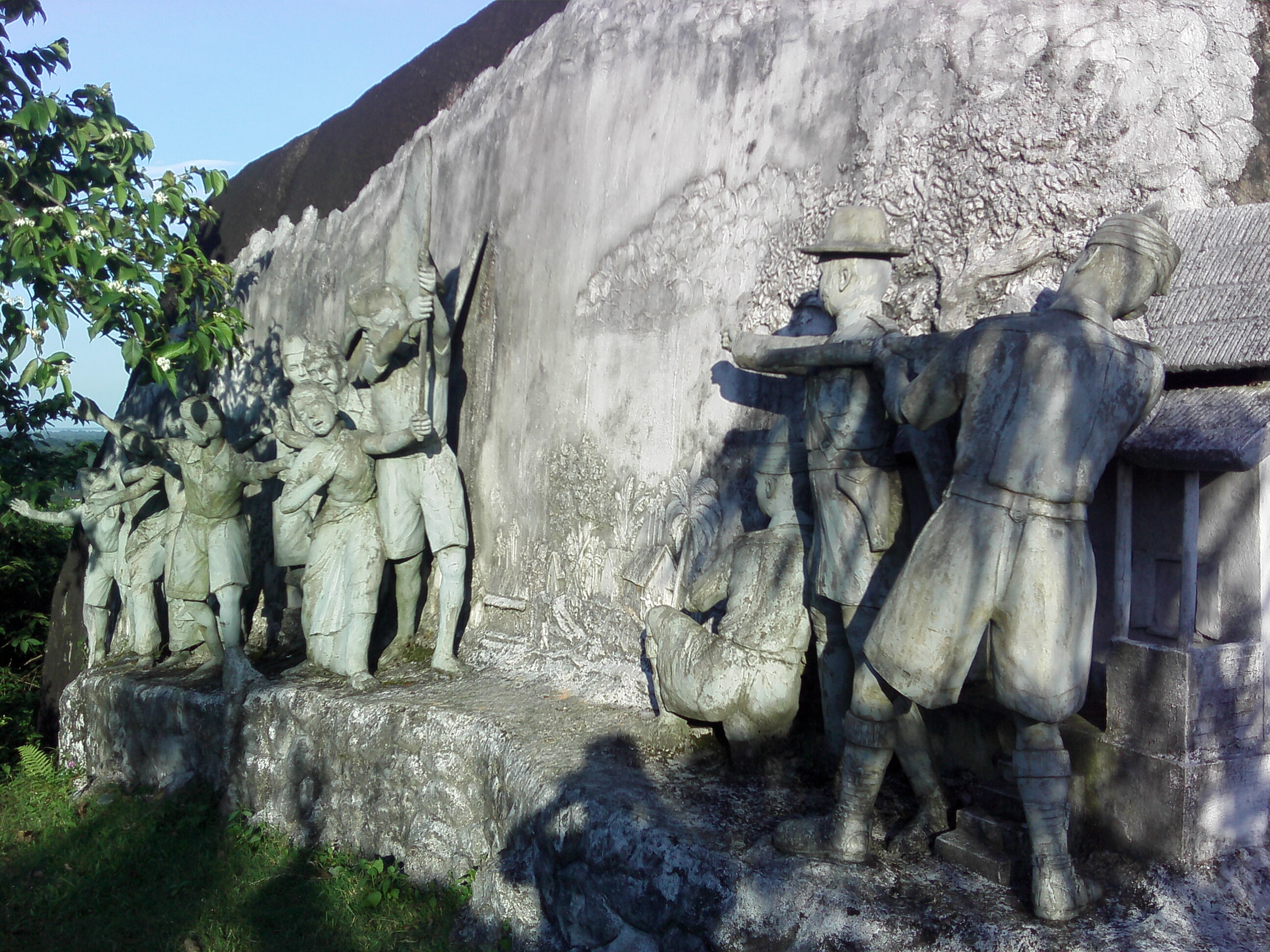
Showing a historical incident at Kanaklata Udyan, Tezpur

The discovery of Camellia sinensis in 1834 in Assam was followed by testing in 1836–37 in London. The British allowed companies to rent land from 1839 onwards. Thereafter tea plantations proliferated in Eastern Assam, where the soil and the climate were most suitable. Problems with the imported Han Chinese labourers from China and hostility from native Assamese resulted in the migration of forced labourers from central and eastern parts of India. After initial trial and error with planting the Chinese and the Assamese-Chinese hybrid varieties, the planters later accepted the local Camellia assamica as the most suitable variety for Assam. By the 1850s, the industry started seeing some profits. The industry saw initial growth, when in 1861, investors were allowed to own land in Assam and it saw substantial progress with the invention of new technologies and machinery for preparing processed tea during the 1870s.

Despite the commercial success, tea labourers continued to be exploited, working and living under poor conditions. Fearful of greater government interference, the tea growers formed the Indian Tea Association in 1888 to lobby to retain the status quo. The organisation was successful in this, but even after India's independence, conditions of the labourers have improved very little.

The Assam Postage Circle was established by 1873 under the headship of the Deputy Post Master General.

Initially, Assam was made a part of the Bengal Presidency, then in 1906 it was made a part of Eastern Bengal and Assam province, and in 1912 it was reconstituted into a chief commissioners' province. In 1913, a legislative council and, in 1937, the Assam Legislative Assembly, were formed in Shillong, the erstwhile capital of the region. The British tea planters imported labour from central India adding to the demographic canvas.

The Assam territory was first separated from Bengal in 1874 as the 'North-East Frontier' non-regulation province, also known as the Assam Chief-Commissionership. It was incorporated into the new province of Eastern Bengal and Assam in 1905 after the partition of Bengal (1905–1911) and re-established in 1912 as Assam Province.

At the turn of the 20th century, British India consisted of eight provinces that were administered either by a governor or a lieutenant-governor. Assam Province was one among the major eight provinces of British India.

After a few initially unsuccessful attempts to gain independence for Assam during the 1850s, anti-colonial Assamese joined and actively supported the Indian National Congress against the British from the early 20th century, with Gopinath Bordoloi emerging as the preeminent nationalist leader in the Assam Congress. Bordoloi's major political rival in this time was Sir Saidullah, who was representing the Muslim League, and had the backing of the influential Muslim cleric Maulana Bhasani.

With the partition of India in 1947, Assam became a constituent state of India. The Sylhet District of Assam (excluding the Karimganj subdivision) was given up to East Pakistan, which later became Bangladesh.

=== Modern history ===
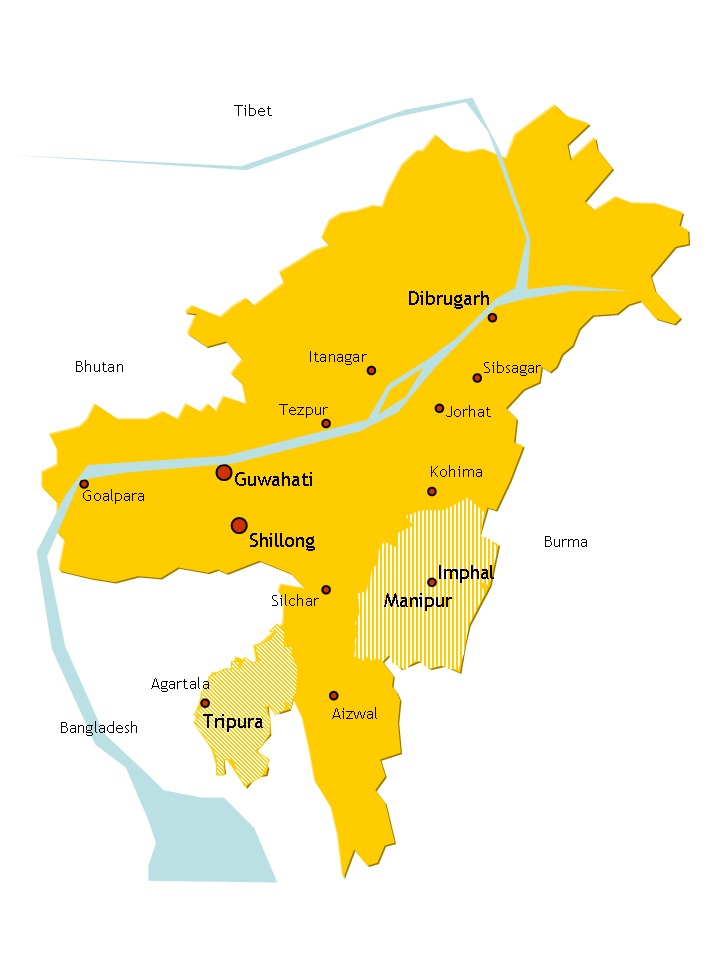
Assam till the 1950s; The new states of Nagaland, Meghalaya and Mizoram formed in the 1960–1970s. The capital of Assam was shifted to Dispur, a suburb of Guwahati. After the Indo-China war in 1962, Arunachal Pradesh was also separated out.

Separatist groups began forming along ethnic lines, and demands for autonomy and sovereignty grew, resulting in the fragmentation of Assam. In 1961, the government of Assam passed legislation making use of the Assamese language compulsory. It was withdrawn later under pressure from Bengali speaking people in Cachar. The government of India, which has the unilateral powers to change the borders of a state, divided Assam into several states within the borders of what was then Assam. In 1963, the Naga Hills district became the 16th state of India under the name of Nagaland. Part of Tuensang was added to Nagaland. In 1970, in response to the demands of the Khasi, Jaintia and Garo people of the Meghalaya Plateau, the districts containing the Khasi Hills, Jaintia Hills, and Garo Hills were formed into an autonomous state within Assam; in 1972 this became a separate state under the name of Meghalaya. In 1972, Arunachal Pradesh (the North East Frontier Agency) and Mizoram (from the Mizo Hills in the south) were separated from Assam as union territories; both became states in 1986. Since the restructuring of Assam after independence, communal tensions and violence remain.

In the 1980s the Brahmaputra Valley saw a six-year Assam Agitation triggered by the discovery of a sudden rise in registered voters on electoral rolls. It tried to force the government to identify and deport foreigners illegally migrating from neighbouring Bangladesh and to provide constitutional, legislative, administrative and cultural safeguards for the indigenous Assamese majority, which they felt was under threat due to the increase of migration from Bangladesh. The agitation ended after an accord (Assam Accord 1985) between its leaders and the Union Government, which remained unimplemented, causing simmering discontent.

The post 1970s experienced the growth of armed separatist groups such as the United Liberation Front of Asom (ULFA) and the National Democratic Front of Bodoland (NDFB). In November 1990, the Government of India deployed the Indian army, after which low-intensity military conflicts and political homicides have been continuing for more than a decade. In recent times, ethnically based militant groups have grown. The Panchayati Raj Act has been applied in Assam, after agitation of the communities due to the sluggish rate of development and general apathy of successive state governments towards Indigenous Assamese communities.

Deadly floods hit the state in 2020 and 2022.

== Geography ==
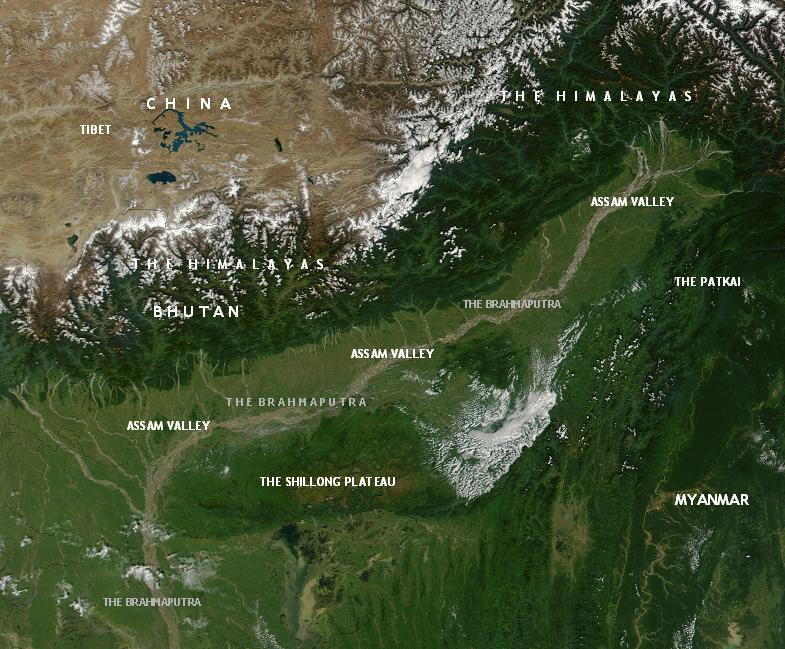
Environs: Assam, dissected hills of the South Indian Plateau system and the Himalayas all around its north, north-east and east.

A significant geographical aspect of Assam is that it contains three of six physiographic divisions of India: The Northern Himalayas (Eastern Hills), The Northern Plains (Brahmaputra plain) and Deccan Plateau (Karbi Anglong). As the Brahmaputra flows in Assam the climate here is cold and there is rainfall most of the month. Geomorphic studies conclude that the Brahmaputra, the life-line of Assam, is an antecedent river older than the Himalayas, which has entrenched itself since they started rising. The river with steep gorges and rapids in Arunachal Pradesh entering Assam, becomes a braided river with tributaries, creates a flood plain known as the Brahmaputra Valley: 80 to 100 km wide, an 1000 km long. The hills of Karbi Anglong, North Cachar and those in and close to Guwahati are originally parts of the South Indian Plateau system. In the south, the Barak River originating in the Barail Range along the Assam-Nagaland border flows through the Cachar district with a 40 to 50 km wide valley and enters Bangladesh with the name Surma River.

Urban centres include Guwahati, one of the 100 fastest growing cities in the world. Guwahati is also referred to as the "Gateway to North-East India". Silchar (in the Barak valley) is the second most populous city in Assam and an important centre of business. Other large cities include Dibrugarh, an oil and natural gas industry centre.

=== Climate ===
With the tropical monsoon climate, Assam is temperate and experiences heavy rainfall and high humidity. The climate is characterised by heavy monsoon downpours reducing summer temperatures and affecting foggy nights and mornings in winters, frequent during the afternoons. Spring (March–April) and autumn (September–October) are usually pleasant with moderate rainfall and temperature. Assam's agriculture usually depends on the south-west monsoon rains.

==== Flooding ====
Every year, rivers like the Brahmaputra and Barak overflow due to heavy rainfall, causing widespread flooding across Assam. The rising water levels submerge nearby areas, washing away houses, livestock, and damaging infrastructure such as bridges, railway tracks, and roads, leading to communication breakdowns in many regions. This natural disaster also results in numerous fatalities throughout the state.

=== Fauna ===
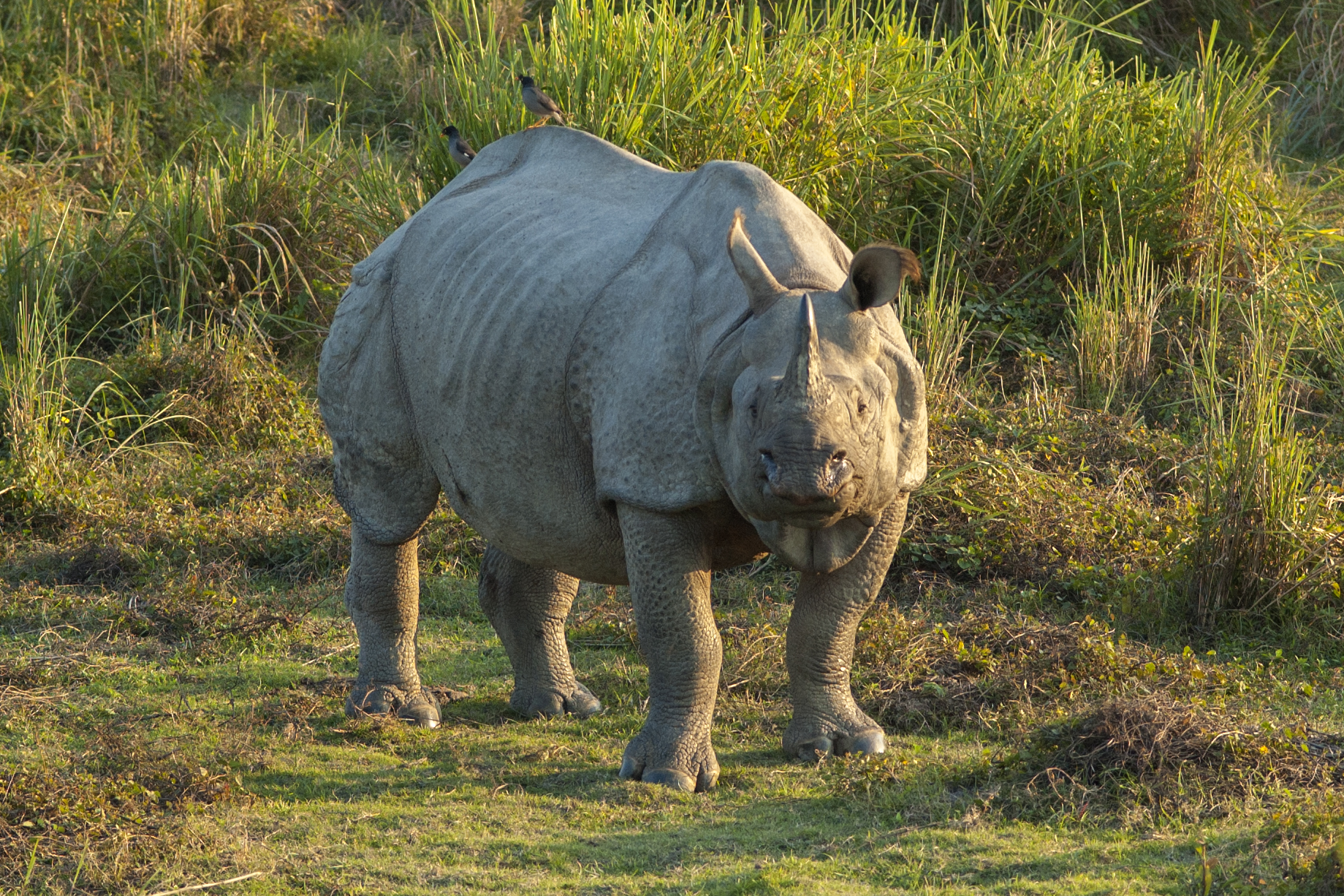
An Indian rhino at Kaziranga National Park

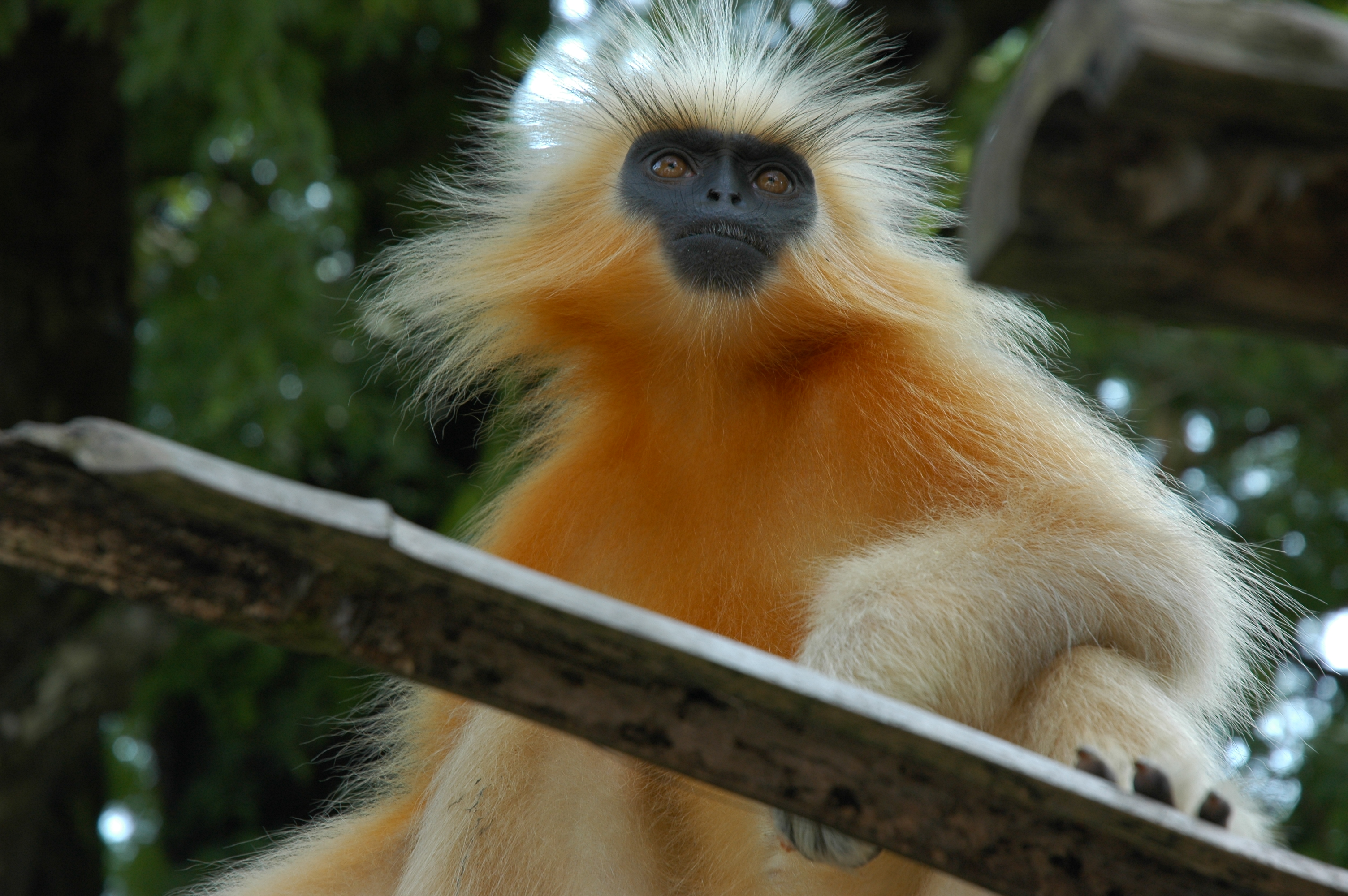
An endangered golden langur

Assam is one of the richest biodiversity zones in the world and consists of tropical rainforests, deciduous forests, riverine grasslands, bamboo orchards and numerous wetland ecosystems; Many are now protected as national parks and reserved forests.

Assam has wildlife sanctuaries, the most prominent of which are two UNESCO World Heritage Sites-the Kaziranga National Park, on the bank of the Brahmaputra River, and the Manas Wildlife Sanctuary, near the border with Bhutan. The Kaziranga is a refuge for the fast-disappearing Indian one-horned rhinoceros. The state is the last refuge for numerous other endangered and threatened species including the white-winged wood duck or deohanh, Bengal florican, black-breasted parrotbill, red-headed vulture, white-rumped vulture, greater adjutant, Jerdon's babbler, rufous-necked hornbill, Bengal tiger, Asian elephant, pygmy hog, gaur, wild water buffalo, Indian hog deer, hoolock gibbon, golden langur, capped langur, barasingha, Ganges river dolphin, Barca snakehead, Ganges shark, Burmese python, Brahminy river turtle, black pond turtle, Asian forest tortoise, and Assam roofed turtle. Threatened species that are extinct in Assam include the gharial, a critically endangered fish-eating crocodilian, and the pink-headed duck (which may be extinct worldwide). For the state bird, the white-winged wood duck, Assam is a globally important area. In addition to the above, there are three other National Parks in Assam namely Dibru Saikhowa National Park, Nameri National Park and the Orang National Park.

Assam has conserved the one-horned Indian rhinoceros from near extinction, along with the pygmy hog, tiger and numerous species of birds, and it provides one of the last wild habitats for the Asian elephant. Kaziranga and Manas are both World Heritage Sites. The state contains Sal tree forests and forest products, much depleted from earlier times. A land of high rainfall, Assam displays greenery. The Brahmaputra River tributaries and oxbow lakes provide the region with hydro-geomorphic environment.

The state has the largest population of the wild water buffalo in the world. The state has the highest diversity of birds in India with around 820 species. With subspecies the number is as high as 946. The mammal diversity in the state is around 190 species.

=== Flora ===
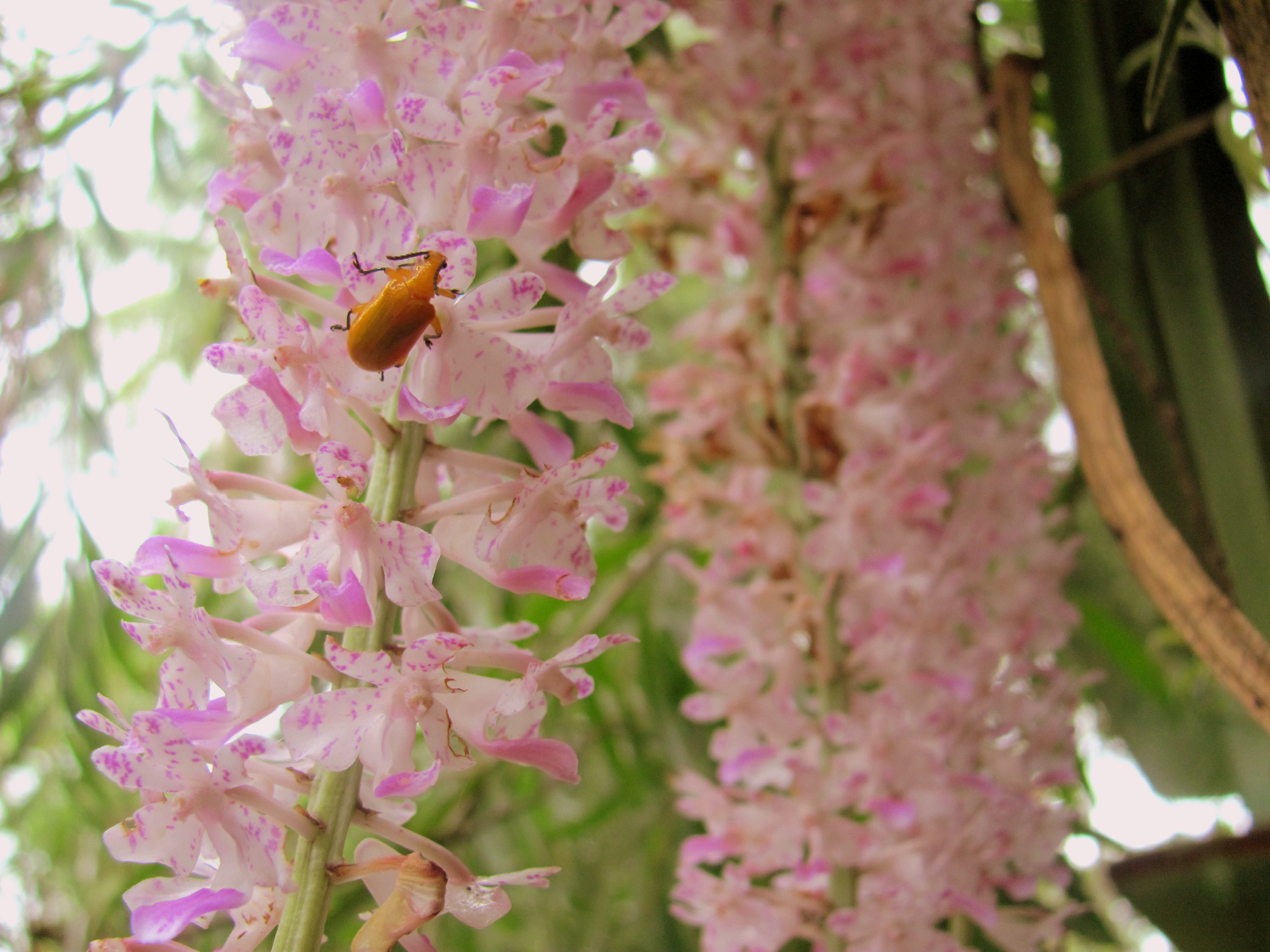
Blooming of Kopou Orchid marks the beginning of the festive season of Bihu in Assam.

Assam is remarkably rich in Orchid species and the Foxtail orchid is the state flower of Assam. The recently established Kaziranga National Orchid and Biodiversity Park boasts more than 500 of the estimated 1,314 orchid species found in India.

=== Geology ===
Assam has petroleum, natural gas, coal, limestone and other minor minerals such as magnetic quartzite, kaolin, sillimanites, clay and feldspar. A small quantity of iron ore is available in western districts. Discovered in 1867, a USGS estimate shows 399 million barrels (63,400,000 m^{3}) of oil, 1,178 billion cubic feet (3.34×10^{10} m^{3}) of gas and 67 million barrels (10,700,000 m^{3}) of natural gas liquids in the Assam Geologic Province.

The region is prone to natural disasters like annual floods and frequent mild earthquakes. Strong earthquakes were recorded in 1869, 1897, and 1950.

== Demographics ==
=== Population ===
Historical population
Year	Pop.	±%
1901	3,289,680	—
1911	3,848,617	+17.0%
1921	4,636,980	+20.5%
1931	5,560,371	+19.9%
1941	6,694,790	+20.4%
1951	8,028,856	+19.9%
1961	10,837,329	+35.0%
1971	14,625,152	+35.0%
1981	18,041,248	+23.4%
1991	22,414,322	+24.2%
2001	26,655,528	+18.9%
2011	31,205,576	+17.1%
Source: Census of India

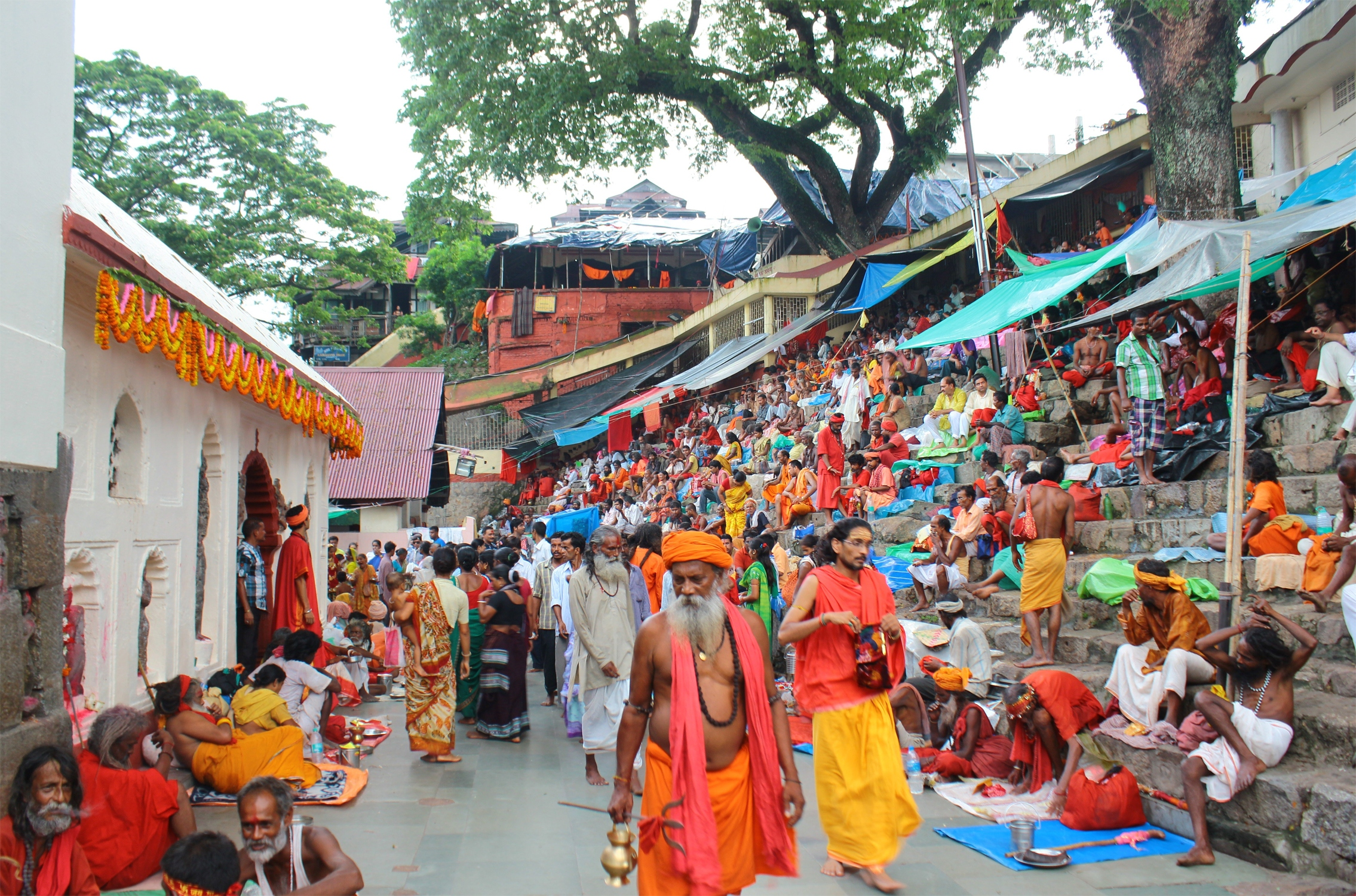
People gathered at Kamakhya Temple for the Ambubachi Mela

The total population of Assam was 26.66 million with 4.91 million households in 2001. Higher population concentration was recorded in the districts of Kamrup, Nagaon, Sonitpur, Barpeta, Dhubri, Darrang, and Cachar. Assam's population was estimated at 28.67 million in 2006 and at 30.57 million in 2011 and is expected to reach 34.18 million by 2021 and 35.60 million by 2026.

As per the 2011 census, the total population of Assam was 31,169,272. The total population of the state has increased from 26,638,407 to 31,169,272 in the last ten years with a growth rate of 16.93%.

Of the 33 districts, Dhubri, Goalpara, Barpeta, Morigaon, Nagaon, and Hailakandi, recorded growth rates ranging from 20 per cent to 24 per cent during the last decade, whereas Sivasagar and Jorhat, registered around 9 per cent population growth. These districts do not have any international border.

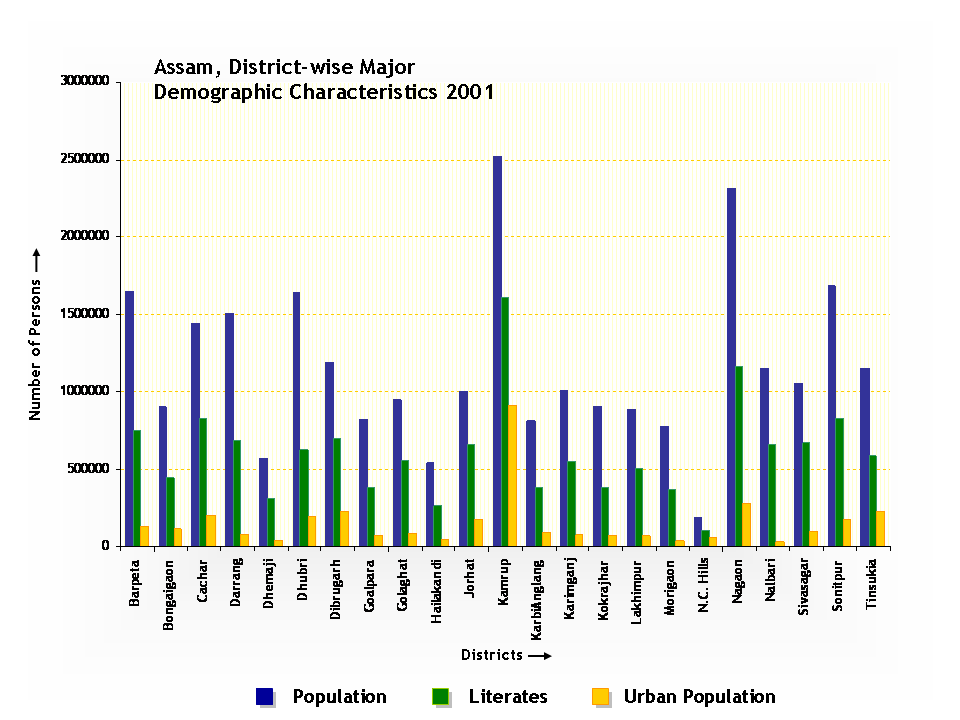
District-wise Demographic Characteristics in 2001

In 2011, the literacy rate in the state was 73.18%. The male literacy rate was 78.81% and the female literacy rate was 67.27%. In 2001, the census had recorded literacy in Assam at 63.3% with male literacy at 71.3% and female at 54.6%. The urbanisation rate was recorded at 12.9%.

The growth of population in Assam has increased since the middle decades of the 20th century. The population grew from 3.29 million in 1901 to 6.70 million in 1941. It increased to 14.63 million in 1971 and 22.41 million in 1991. The growth in the Western districts and Southern districts was high primarily due to the influx of large number of illegal immigrants from East Pakistan, now Bangladesh.

The mistrust and clashes between indigenous Assamese people and Bengali Muslims started as early as 1952, but is rooted in anti Bengali sentiments of the 1940s. At least 77 people died and 400,000 people were displaced in the 2012 Assam violence between indigenous Bodos and Bengali Muslims.

The People of India project has studied 115 of the ethnic groups in Assam. 79 (69%) identify themselves regionally, 22 (19%) locally, and 3 trans-nationally. The earliest settlers were Austroasiatic, Dravidian followed by Tibeto-Burman, Indo-Aryan, and Tai–Kadai people. Forty-five languages are spoken by different communities, including three major language families: Austroasiatic (5), Sino-Tibetan (24) and Indo-European (12). Three of the spoken languages do not fall in these families. There is a high degree of bilingualism.

According to the World Air Quality Report 2024 by IQAir, Byrnihat located along the Assam-Meghalaya border is the most polluted city in India.

=== Religions ===
Kamakhya Temple

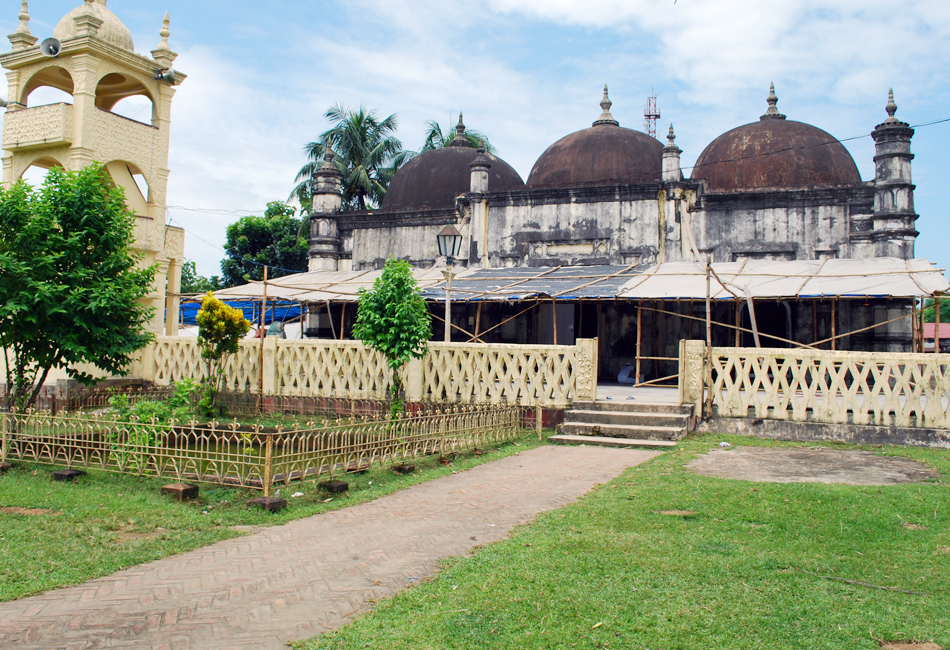
Panbari Mosque, Dhubri

Growth of Religions in Assam (1951–2011)
Census Year	Hinduism (%)	Islam (%)	Christianity (%)
1951	70.78	24.68	0.72
1961	71.34	25.52	1.25
1971	72.51	24.57	2.73
1991	69.93	28.43	3.32
2001	64.89	30.92	3.70
2011	61.47	34.22	3.74

Religions of Assam (2011)
1. Hinduism (61.5%)
2. Islam (34.2%)
3. Christianity (3.70%)
4. Buddhism (0.20%)
5. Jainism (0.01%)
6. Sikhism (0.01%)
7. Atheist (0.40%)

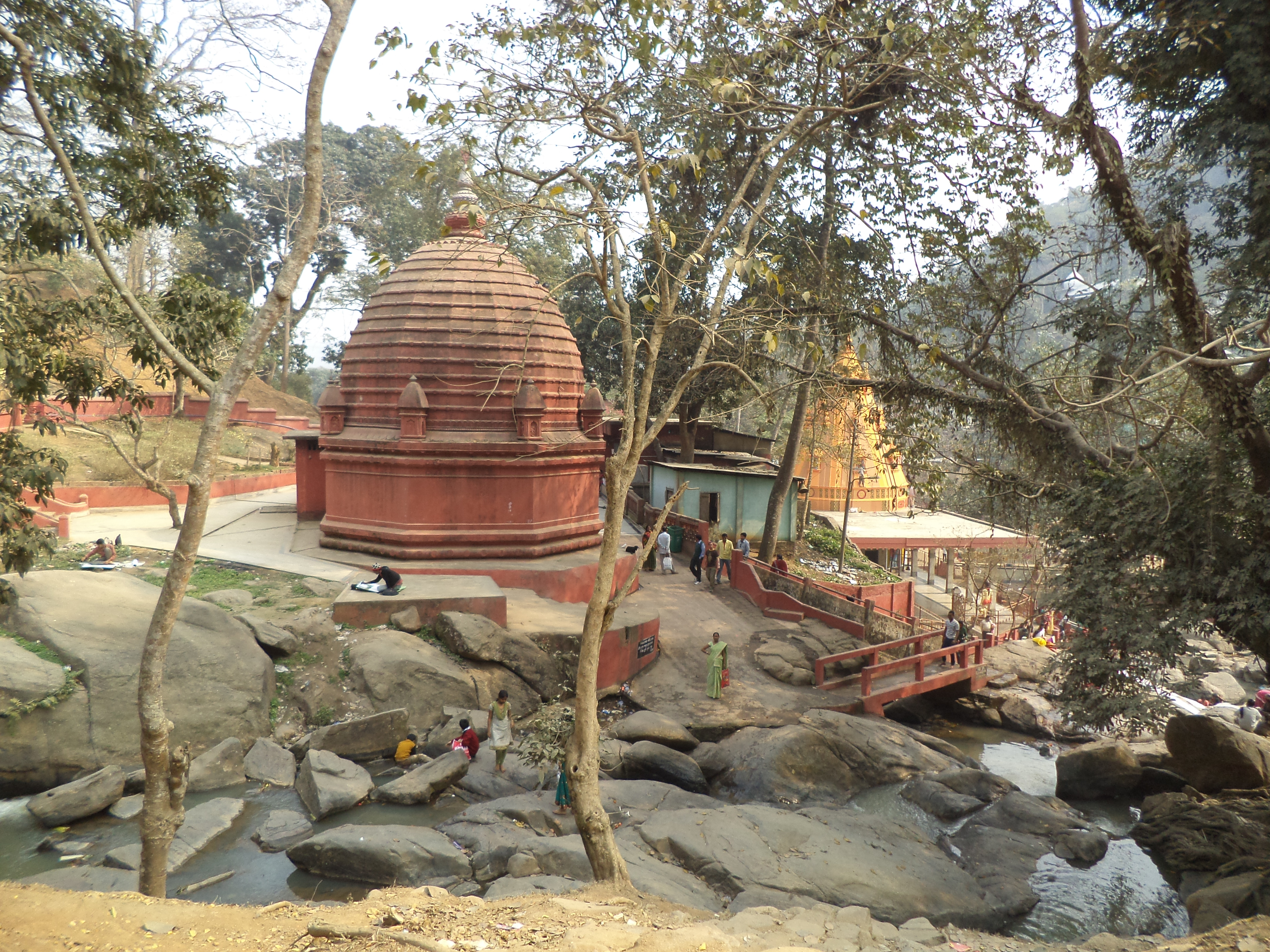
Basistha Temple in Guwahati.

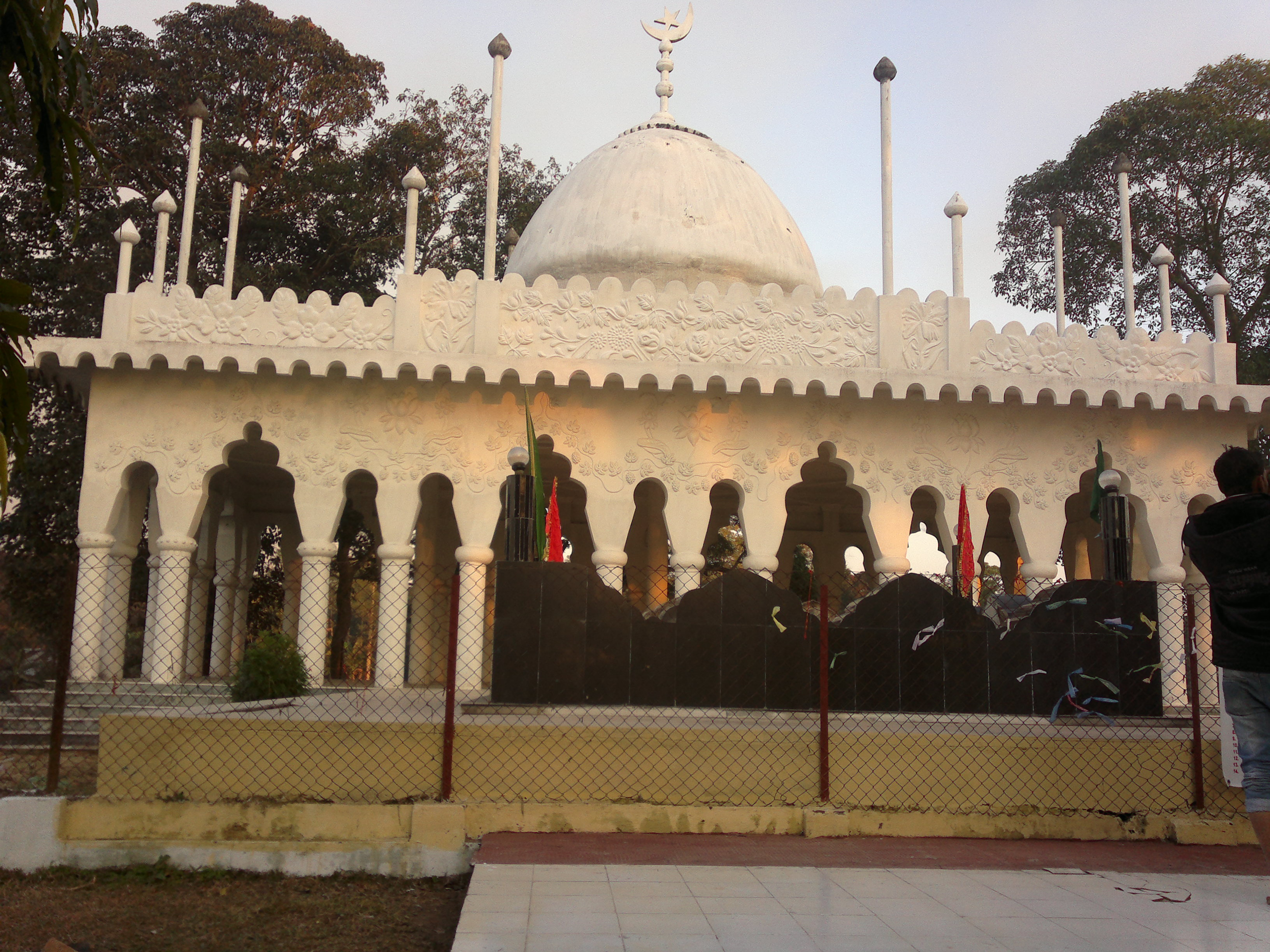
Azan Faqir dargah at Saraguri Chapari near Sibsagar town.

Siva Doul ,Sivasagar,Assam,India

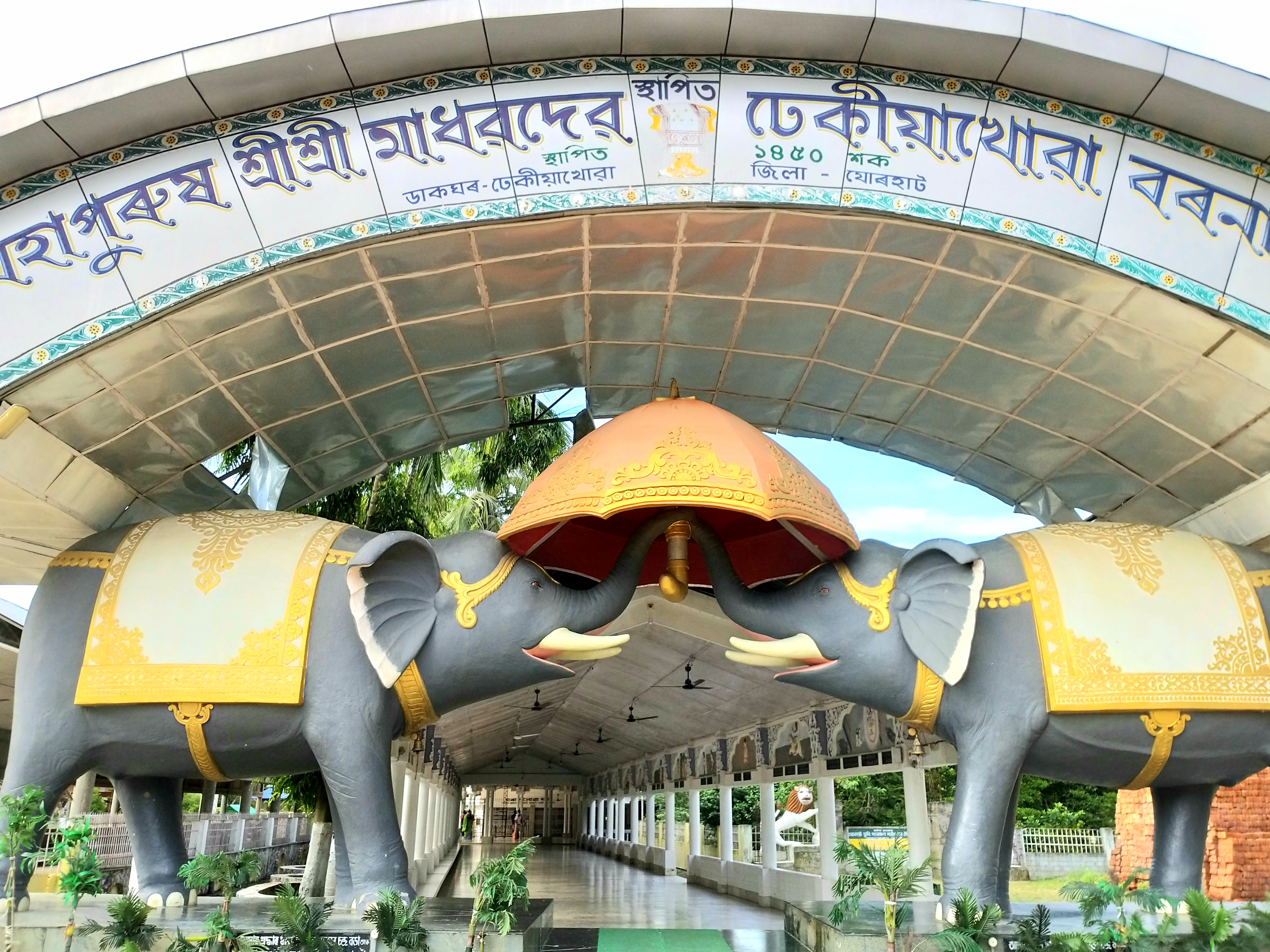
Dhekiakhowa Bornamghar,Jorhat,Assam,India

According to the 2011 census, 61.47% were Hindus, 34.22% were Muslims. Christian minorities (3.7%) are found among the Scheduled Tribe and Castes population.

The Scheduled Tribe population in Assam is around 13%, of which Bodos account for 40%. Other religious groups in Assam include Jainism (0.1%), Buddhism (0.2%), Sikhism (0.1%) and Animism (among Khamti, Phake, Aiton etc. communities).

The three popular sects of Hinduism, namely, Shaivisim, Shaktism, and Vaishnavism are prevalent here. Many Assamese Hindus are also followers of the Ekasarana Dharma sect of Hinduism.

Assam's Religious diversity as of the 2011 census
Religion	Population
Hindus	19,180,759
Muslims	10,679,345
Christians	1,165,867
Buddhists	54,993
Jains	25,949
Sikhs	20,672
Other religions	27,118
Not stated/available	50,873
Total	31,205,576

Out of 32 districts of Assam, 9 are Muslim majority according to the 2011 census of India: Dhubri, Goalpara, Barpeta, Morigaon, Nagaon, Karimganj, Hailakandi, Darrang and Bongaigaon.

=== Languages ===
Languages spoken by district Assamese 30–40% 40–50% 50–60% 60–70% 70-80% 80-90% 90–100% Bengali 70–80% 80–90% Boro 20–30% 30–40% Karbi 40–50% Dimasa 30–40%

7th–8th century specimen of Assamese (Kamarupi) literature

Languages of Assam (2011)
1. Assamese (48.4%)
2. Bengali (28.9%)
3. Bodo (4.51%)
4. Hindi (3.21%)
5. Sadri (2.29%)
6. Mishing (1.98%)
7. Nepali (1.91%)
8. Karbi (1.64%)
9. Others (7.16%)

Assamese and Bodo are the official languages of the state, Meitei (Manipuri) is official in Hojai district and all the three districts of Barak Valley, while Bengali is official in the three districts of Barak Valley, where Sylheti is most commonly spoken.

Assam linguistic diversity as per (2011 census)
Language	Population
Assamese	15,097,257
Bengali	9,024,652
Bodo	1,407,371
Hindi	1,001,698
Sadri	714,607
Mishing	617,870
Nepali	596,026
Karbi	511,771
Others	2,234,319
Total	31,205,576

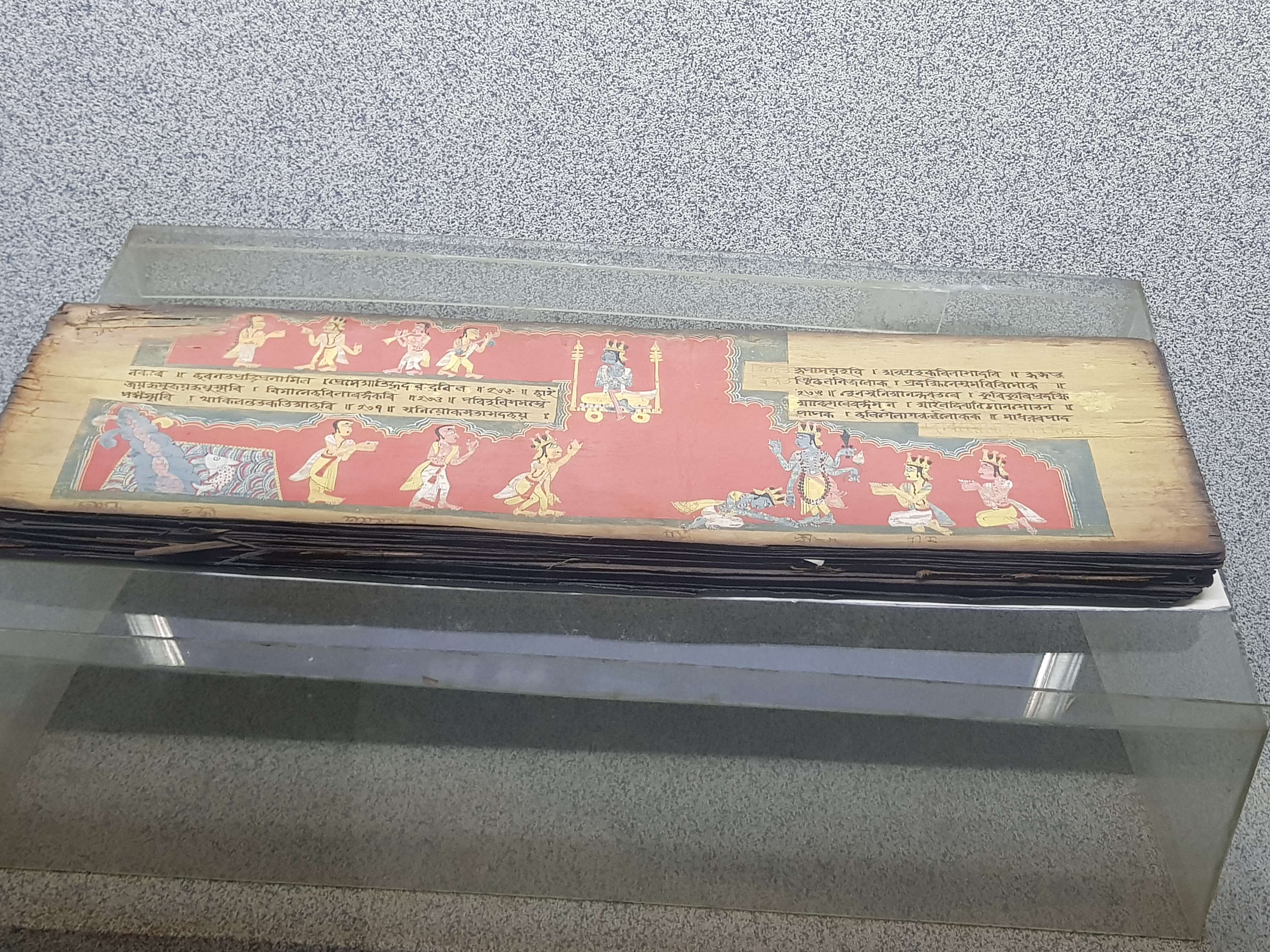
An early 18th century illustrated Assamese manuscript

According to the language census of 2011 in Assam, out of a total population of around 31 million, Assamese is spoken by more than 22 million total speakers, with more than 15 million people speaking it as their mother tongue and around 7 million as L2 speakers. Although the number of speakers is growing, the percentage of Assam's population who have it as a mother tongue has fallen slightly. Assamese serves as lingua franca of the region as it is spoken by over 71% of the population (including the one who have listed Assamese as their 2nd language, while 48.38% of them speak it as their mother tongue. According to the 24th Edition of Ethnologue: Languages of the World, Assamese is spoken by 15,327,990 persons as mother tongue across the world as of 2021. However, 2016 Assam Legislative Assembly election results, have found that 10 million people speaks Assamese as their mother tongue in Assam, which is significantly fewer than the census result of 2011. The Assamese speakers constituted 48% of the State population according to the 2011 Census.

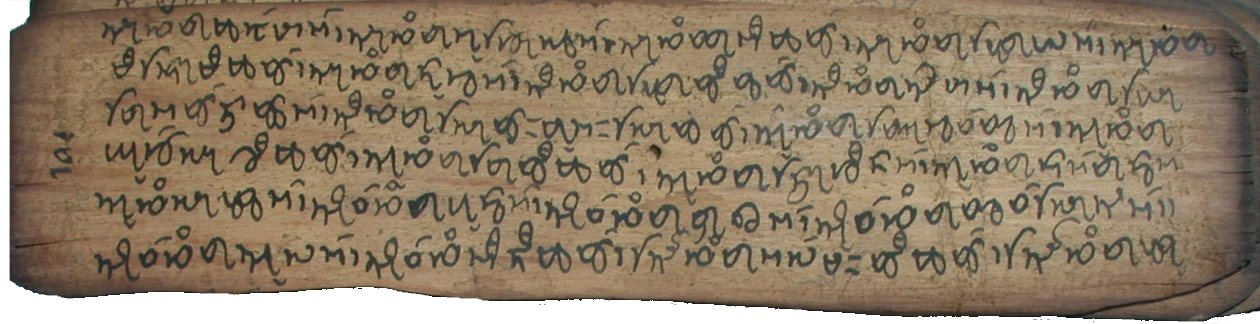
Tai-Ahom manuscript (Buranji)

The various Bengali dialects and closely related languages are spoken by around 9 million people in Assam, and the portion of the population that speaks these languages has grown slightly as per the census. However, the number of Bengali speakers is estimated to be more than the expected census results, as 30% of the 35% Muslim population in Assam as per 2011 are thought to speak different dialects of Bengali as their native language but during census enumeration, they have reported their mother tongue as Assamese. In the Brahmaputra Valley, the main Bengali dialect is that of Mymensingh (now in Bangladesh), while in the Barak Valley and Hojai district, Sylheti is the main language which is also considered to be a dialect of Bengali in census. Bodo is the third most-spoken language followed by Hindi which comes under fourth position.

Languages spoken in Brahmaputra valley (2011)
1. Assamese (Official) (55.6%)
2. Bengali (22.1%)
3. Hindi (7.60%)
4. Bodo (5.13%)
5. Others (9.52%)

The population of the Brahmaputra Valley is 27,580,977 according to the 2011 census report. Assamese is the official language of the Brahmaputra Valley and is spoken by 15 million people comprising 55.65% of the valley population. Bengali is spoken by 6.09 million people representing 22.1% of the valley, Hindi is spoken by 2.1 million comprising 7.61% of the region, Bodo is spoken by 1.41 million comprising 5.13% of the valley's population and 2.98 million people speak various indigenous tribal languages of Assam, such as Karbi, Tiwa (Lalung), Hmar, Deori, Rabha, Mishing, Koch, Rajbangshi, Garo, Dimasa, Gorkha, Halam, Ao and Motak.

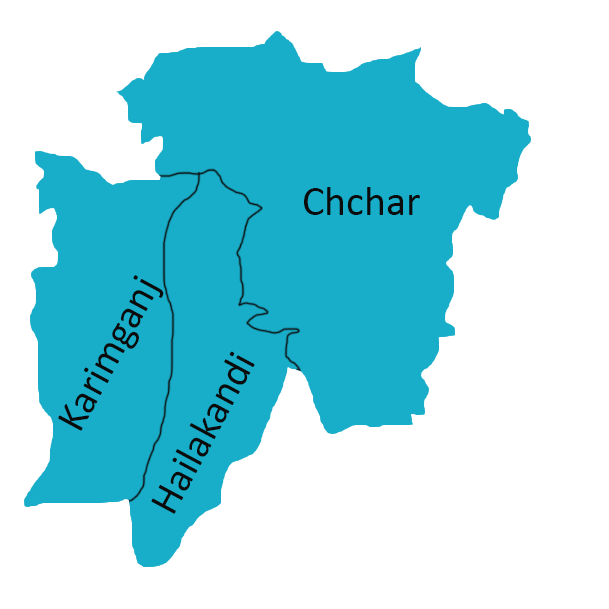
Barak valley region of Assam

Languages spoken in Barak Valley (2011)
1. Bengali (80.8%)
2. Hindi (10.0%)
3. Manipuri (3.49%)
4. Bishnupriya Manipuri (1.38%)
5. Dimasa (0.60%)
6. Tripuri (0.59%)
7. Khasi (0.59%)
8. Odia (0.53%)
9. Nepali (0.14%)
10. Others (1.84%)

The population of the Barak Valley is 3,624,599 according to the 2011 census report. Bengali is the official as well as the most spoken language of the region with approximately 2,930,378 native speakers. Although Bengali is reported as the most spoken in the census, the most common spoken language is Sylheti, a language that is generally grouped with Bengali as a dialect. Meitei (also called Manipuri) is the associate official language of the region with 126,498 speakers. Hindi, Bishnupriya and Dimasa are the other most widely spoken languages with 362,459, 50,019 and 21,747 native speakers, respectively. Tripuri, Khasi, Odia, Nepali and Marwari are also spoken by a considerable minority, while 1.84% of the total population speaks other tribal languages.

Traditionally, Assamese was the language of the common folk in the ancient Kamarupa kingdom and in the medieval kingdoms of Dimasa Kachari, Chutiya Kachari, Borahi Kachari, Ahom and Kamata kingdoms. Traces of the language are found in many poems by Luipa, Sarahapa, and others, in Charyapada (c. 7th–8th century CE). Modern dialects such as Kamrupi and Goalpariya are remnants of this language, which blend into the Rajbanshi and Rangpuri lects spoken in North Bengal which have the same origin. Moreover, Assamese in its traditional form was used by the ethno-cultural groups in the region as lingua-franca, which spread during the stronger kingdoms and was required for economic integration. Localised forms of the language still exist in Nagaland and Arunachal Pradesh.

Linguistically modern Assamese traces its roots to the version developed by the American Missionaries based on the local form used near Sivasagar (Xiwôxagôr) district.

Bodo is spoken largely in Western Assam. It is official language of the Bodoland territorial region and co-official language of the state of Assam. It is also one of twenty-two languages listed in the Eighth Schedule of the Constitution of India. Spatial distribution patterns of the ethno-cultural groups, cultural traits and the phenomenon of naming all the major rivers in the North East Region with Bodo-Kachari words (e.g. Dihing, Dibru, Dihong, D/Tista, and Dikrai) reveal that it was more widely-spoken in ancient times. Other languages of Tibeto-Burman origin and related to Bodo-Kachari are Deori, Mising, Karbi, Rabha, and Tiwa.

There are approximately 590,000 Nepali speakers spread all over the state forming about 1.98% of Assam's total population according to 2011 census.

There are speakers of Tai languages in Assam. A total of six Tai languages were spoken in Assam. Two are now extinct.

- Tai Phake
- Tai Aiton
- Khamti
- Khamyang (critically endangered)
- Ahom (extinct)
- Turung (extinct)

There are also speakers of Dravidian Kurukh and Austroasiatic Khasi speakers scattered across Assam.

== Government and politics ==
Dispur, located in the Guwahati metropolitan region, is the capital of the state. Dibrugarh was announced as the second capital, and would start functioning in 2027. Assam has a unicameral legislature consisting of 126 members. The government is de jure headed by the governor and de facto led by the Chief Minister of Assam.

=== Administrative divisions ===
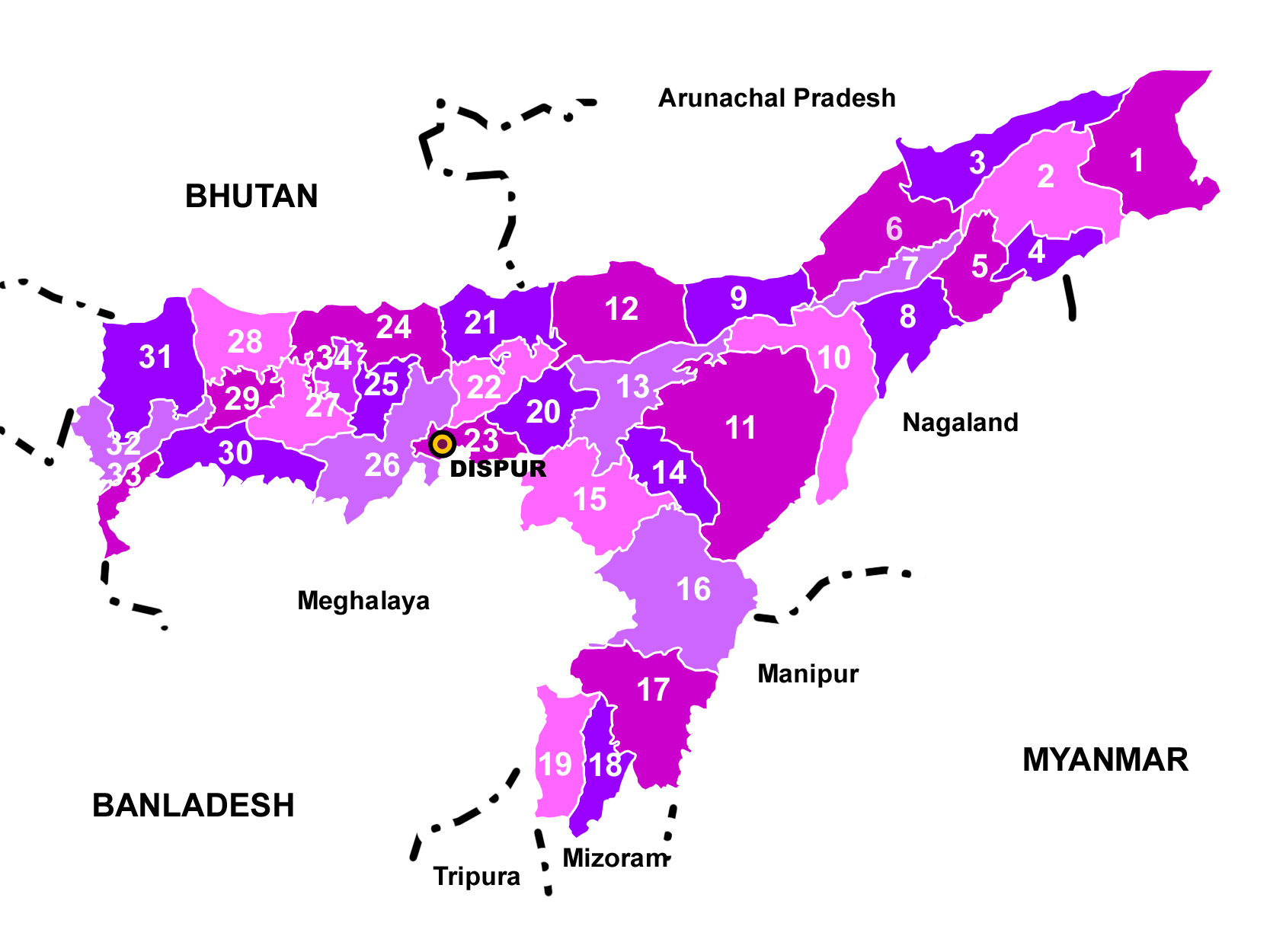
1. Tinsukia 2. Dibrugarh 3. Dhemaji 4. Charaideo 5. Sivasagar 6.Lakhimpur 7. Majuli 8. Jorhat 9. Biswanath(merged with Sonitpur district) 10. Golaghat 11. Karbi Anglong 12. Sonitpur 13. Nagaon 14. Hojai(merged with Nagaon district)15. Karbi Anglong West 16. Dima Hasao 17. Cachar 18. Hailakandi 19. Karimganj 20. Morigaon 21. Udalguri 22. Darrang 23. Kamrup Metro 24. Baksa 25. Nalbari 26. Kamrup 27. Barpeta 28. Chirang 29. Bongaigaon 30. Goalpara 31. Kokrajhar 32. Dhubri 33. South Salmara Mankachar 34. Bajali(merged with Barpeta district)

The state is divided into five regional divisions, further divided into 35 administrative districts, delineated based on geographic features.

On 15 August 2015, five new districts were formed:

- Part of Sonitpur became the Biswanath district (9 in the nearby map)
- Part of Sivasagar became the Charaideo district (4)
- Part of Nagaon became the Hojai district (14)
- Part of Dhubri became the South Salmara-Mankachar district (33)
- The Karbi Anglong district was divided into East (11) and West (15) districts

On 27 June 2016, an island in the Brahmaputra River was bifurcated from the Jorhat district and declared the Majuli district, India's first district that is a river island.

On 12 January 2021, Bajali was carved out from Barpeta district and formally declared as a district. With the announcement made by Governor Jagdish Mukhi, it has become the 34th district of Assam.

On 31 December 2022, existing four districts Bajali (with Barpeta), Tamulpur(with Udalguri), Biswanath (with Sonitpur) and Hojai(with Nagaon) and number of district came down to 31.

However, after the delimitation exercise was carried out in Assam, the Assam Cabinet reconstituted the 4 new districts (Bajali, Tamulpur, Biswanath and Hojai), taking the number of districts to 35 again.

=== Subdivisions ===
The administrative districts are further subdivided into 54 "Subdivisions" or Mahakuma. Every district is administered from a district headquarters with the office of the Deputy Commissioner, District Magistrate, Office of the District Panchayat and usually with a district court.

The local governance system is organised under the jila-parishad (District Panchayat) for a district, panchayat for group of or individual rural areas and under the urban local bodies for the towns and cities. There are now 2489 village panchayats covering 26247 villages in Assam. The 'town-committee' or nagar-somiti for small towns, 'municipal board' or pouro-sobha for medium towns and municipal corporation or pouro-nigom for the cities consist of the urban local bodies.

For revenue purposes, the districts are divided into revenue circles and mouzas; for the development projects, the districts are divided into 219 'development-blocks' and for law and order these are divided into 206 police stations or thana.

Guwahati is the largest metropolitan area and urban conglomeration administered under the highest form of urban local body – Guwahati Municipal Corporation in Assam. The Corporation administers an area of 216.79 km^{2} (83.70 sq mi). Apart from Guwahati Municipal Corporation and Dibrugarh Municipal Corporation All other urban centres are managed under Municipal Boards.

A list of 9 oldest, classified and prominent, and constantly inhabited, recognised urban centres based on the earliest years of formation of the civic bodies, before the Indian independence of 1947 is tabulated below:

Oldest recognised urban centres of Assam
Urban Centres	Civic Body	Year	Airport	Railway Station	Railway Junction	Road Networks	Category^{†}	Notes
Guwahati	Guwahati Town Committee	1853	Yes	Yes	Yes	Yes	Tier – III	More Guwahati, the first township of Assam.
Guwahati	Guwahati Municipal Board	1873^{↑}	Yes	Yes	Yes	Yes	Tier – II	
Guwahati	Guwahati Municipal Corporation	1974^{↑}	Yes	Yes	Yes	Yes	Tier – I	More Establishment of Guwahati Municipal Corporation.
Dibrugarh	Dibrugarh Municipal Board & Dibrugarh Municipal Corporation	1873 & 2024	Yes	Yes	Yes	Yes	Tier – II	More Dibrugarh, the second township of Assam.
Goalpara	Goalpara Municipal Board	1875	No ^{1}	Yes	No ^{2}	Yes	Tier – II	More Formation of Goalpara Municipality, 1875.
Dhubri	Dhubri Municipal Board	1883	Yes	Yes	Yes	Yes	Tier – II	More Formation of Dhubri Municipality, 1883.
Nagaon	Nagaon Municipal Board	1893	No ^{3}	Yes	Yes	Yes	Tier – II	More Formation of Nagaon Municipality, 1893.
Tezpur	Tezpur Municipal Board	1894	Yes	Yes	Yes	Yes	Tier – II	More Formation of Tezpur Municipality, 1894.
Jorhat	Jorhat Municipal Board	1909	Yes	Yes	Yes	Yes	Tier – II	More Formation of Jorhat Municipality, 1909.
Golaghat	Golaghat Municipal Board	1920	No ^{4}	Yes	Yes	Yes	Tier – II	More Formation of Golaghat Municipality, 1920.
Silchar	Silchar Municipal Board	1922	Yes	Yes	Yes	Yes	Tier – II	More Formation of Silchar Municipality, 1922.
†Tier – I: a big city with an urban conglomeration (in the true sense) administered by a Municipal corporation. Tier – II: a medium–sized city for an urban agglomeration administered by a Municipal Board. Tier – III: a small town, larger than a township with a sizeable human settlement. ↑Upgraded to the next highest form of civic body.
Jointly shared with the other urban centre. ^1 and ^2 Shared with Guwahati. ^3 Shared with Tezpur. ^4 Shared with Jorhat.

=== Autonomous Council ===
The state has three autonomous councils under the sixth schedule of the Indian Constitution.

- Bodoland Autonomous Territorial Council
- Karbi Anglong Autonomous Council.
- Dima Hasao Autonomous Council.

The state has further statutory autonomous councils constituted under State Act-

- Tiwa Autonomous Council for ethnic Tiwa people (Lalung)
- Rabha Hasong Autonomous Council
- Mising Autonomous Council for Mising people
- Deori Autonomous Council
- Sonowal Kachari Autonomous Council for Sonowal Kachari people
- Thengal Kachari Autonomous Council
- Moran Autonomous Council for Moran people
- Dudhnoi for ethnic Rabha Kachari
- Mising Autonomous Council for Mising people
- Matak Autonomous Council for Matak people
- Kamatapur Autonomous Council for Rajbongshi people
- Bodo Kachari Welfare Autonomous Council for Bodo-Kachari people living outside the Bodoland Territorial Region

In March 2024, the Assam cabinet had given green signal for 'Kiran Sheikh' development council for the 'Kiran Sheikh' community in Barak Valley.

=== Politics ===
The state was ruled by Indian National Congress led governments since its inception in 1950 till 2016. On 19 May 2016, the Bharatiya Janata Party under the leadership of Sarbananda Sonowal won the assembly elections, thus forming the first BJP-led government in Assam. The BJP government was re-elected in 2021 under the leadership of Himanta Biswa Sarma.

== Disputes and social issues ==
=== Inter-state dispute ===
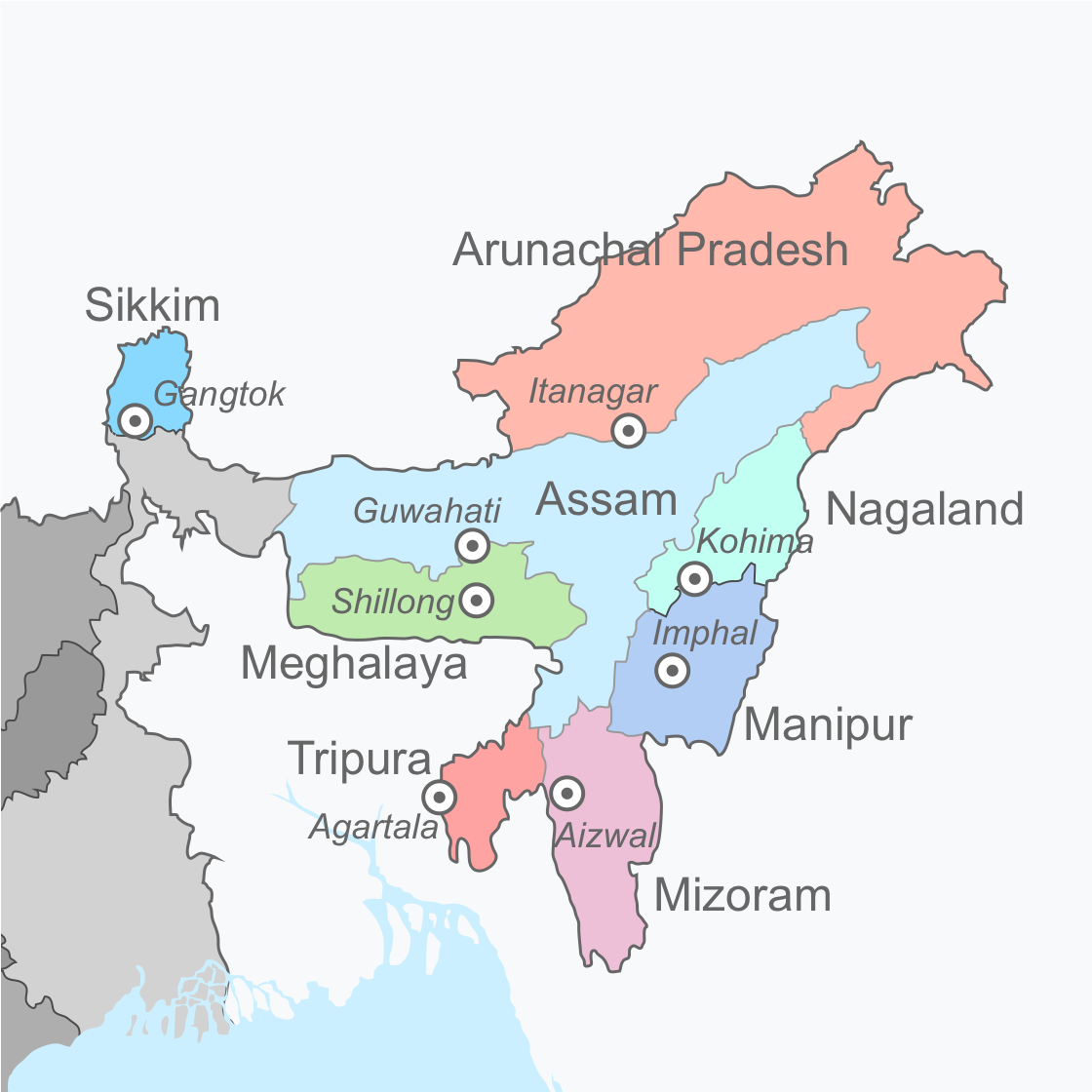

According to Assam Government, Assam has border dispute with four states namely Meghalaya, Mizoram, Nagaland, Arunachal Pradesh.

==== Assam-Mizoram dispute ====
Mizoram used to be a district of Assam as Lushai hills before being carved out as a separate union territory and later, becoming another state in 1987. Because of the history, the district's borders did not really matter for locals for a long time. Mizoram shares a border with the districts Cachar, Hailakandi and Karimganj which comes under Barak valley region of Assam. Over time, the two states started having different perceptions about where the demarcation should be. While Mizoram wants it to be along an Inner Line Permit notified in 1875 to protect tribals from outside influence, which Mizos feel is part of their historical homeland, Assam wants it to be demarcated according to district boundaries drawn up later.

==== Assam-Meghalaya dispute ====
Meghalaya has identified close to a dozen areas on which it has a dispute with Assam about the state's borders. The chief ministers of the two states, Himanta Biswa Sarma and Megahalya's Conrad Sangma, held in 2021 the first-ever meeting on inter-state border dispute. Both the states have agreed to individually assess the claims for all 12 areas flagged by Meghalaya in the past.

==== Assam-Nagaland dispute ====
The border dispute between the two states has been going on since the formation of Nagaland in 1963. The two states lay claim to Merapani, a small village next to the plains of Assam's Golaghat district. There have been reports of violent clashes in the region since the 1960s.

==== Assam-Arunachal Pradesh dispute ====
Assam shares an 804 kilometres long inter-state boundary with Arunachal Pradesh. The state of Arunachal Pradesh, created in 1987, claims some land that traditionally belonged to its residents has been given to Assam. A tripartite committee had recommended that certain territories be transferred from Assam to Arunachal. The two states have since been battling it out in the Supreme court of India over the issue. Some incidents of local violence have been reported from the borders.

=== Separate statehood demand within Assam ===
==== Ahomland ====
Upper Assam's various Tai-Ahom organisations like "Ahom Tai Mangoliya Rajya Parishad" (ATMRP), has been demanding a separate Ahomland state since 1967, comprising erstwhile Un-divided Sivasagar and Lakhimpur districts (today's Upper Assam and North Assam divisions) respectively. On 2023, "Tai Ahom Yuba Parishad, Assam" (TAYPA) have organised a protest at Chachal and have demanded separate Ahomland state.

==== Barak state ====
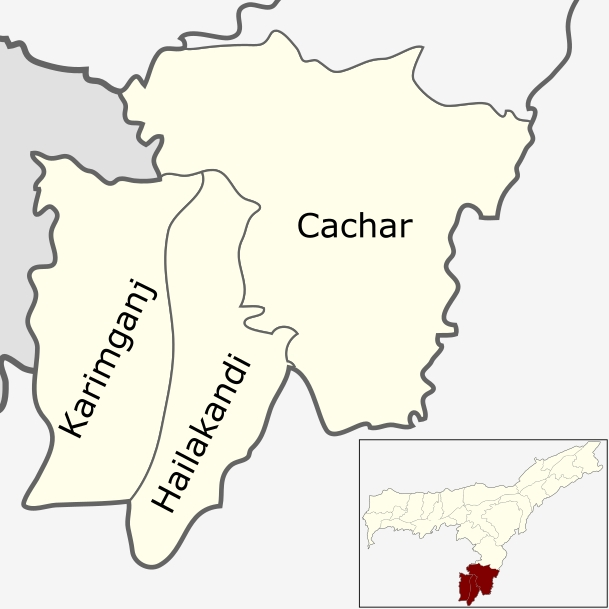
Barak Valley

The Barak Valley of Assam comprising the present districts of Cachar, Karimganj and Hailakandi is contiguous to Sylhet (Bengal plains), where the Bengalis, according to historian J.B. Bhattacharjee, had settled well before the colonial period, influencing the culture of Dimasa Kacaharis. Bhattacharjee describes that the Dimasa kings spoke Bengali, the inscriptions and coins were written in Bengali script and the official language of the court was also Bengali. Migrations to Cachar increased after the British annexation of the region. The native Bengali people of Southern Assam demanded separate state for themselves within the Bengali majority areas of Assam particularly Bengali majority Barak valley comprising three districts: Cachar, Hailakandi, Karimganj along with Dima Hasao and parts of Hojai was also demanded to meet the criteria for creating a separate state for themselves by carving out from Assam's Assamese majority Brahmaputra Valley post NRC. Silchar is the proposed capital of Barak state. Barak valley is the most neglected part of Assam in terms of its infrastructure development, tourism sector, educational institutions, hospitals, IT industries, G.D.P, H.D.I etc. which is still lagging behind in comparison to the Assam's mainland Brahmaputra Valley which have access to all of those facilities mentioned above. In fact, the Assam's Southern part have an overall indigenous Bengali majority population, particularly Hojai have overall (54%) Bengali-speaking population, Barak Valley region have an overwhelming Bengali majority of about 80.3%, while Dima Hasao have approximately 30.2% significant Bengali plurality on certain pockets specially in the urban areas of the district.

==== Bodoland ====
Bodoland district map

The agitation for the creation of a separate Bodoland state resulted in an agreement between the Indian Government, the Assam state government and the Bodo Liberation Tigers Force. According to the agreement made on 10 February 2003, the Bodoland Territorial Council, an entity subordinate to the government of Assam, was created to govern four districts covering 3082 Bodo Kachari-majority villages in Assam. Elections to the council were held on 13 May 2003, and Hagrama Mohilary was sworn in as the chief of the council on 4 June. Demographic wise, the Indigenous Bodo tribe constitutes half of the region's population, along with a significant large number of other ethnic minorities which includes: Assamese, Koch Rajbangshi, Garo, Rabha tribe, Adivasis, Nepalis, Tea tribes, Bengalis, Biharis, Marwaris and Muslims.

==== Dimaraji ====
The Dimasa people of northeast India have been demanding a separate state called Dimaraji or "Dimaland" for several decades. It would comprise the Dimasa-Kachari inhabited areas, namely Dima Hasao district, Cachar district, parts of Barak Valley, Nagaon district, Hojai district and Karbi Anglong district in Assam together with part of Dimapur district in Nagaland.

==== Karbiland ====
Karbiland

Karbi Anglong is one of the 35 districts of Assam. Karbi Anglong was previously known as Mikir Hills. It was part of the Excluded Areas and Partially Excluded Areas in British India. The British Indian government had never included this area under their government's jurisdiction. Thereby, no government development work or activity were done, nor any tax levied from the hills including Karbi Anglong. The first memorandum for a Karbi homeland was presented to Governor Reid on 28 October 1940 by Semsonsing Ingti and Khorsing Terang at Mohongdijua. The Karbi leaders were then part of the All Party Hill Leaders' Conference formed on 6 July 1960. The movement again gained momentum when the Karbi Anglong District Council passed a resolution demanding a Separate State in 1981, and again in 1986 through the leadership of Autonomous State Demand Committee, demanding autonomous statehood of Karbi Anglong and Dima Hasao.

In 2002, the Karbi Anglong Autonomous Council passed another resolution to press for the demand of statehood, and other memoranda were submitted at different times by several organisations. The demand for a separate state turned violent on 31 July 2013 when student demonstrators set government buildings on fire. Following the incident, the elected leaders of Karbi Anglong jointly submitted a memorandum to the Prime Minister of India demanding a separate State.

Demographic wise, more than half of the Karbi Anglong population is made up of Indigenous Karbi tribe with significant migrants from other parts of India.

=== Migration from Bangladesh ===
Assam has been a major site of migration since the Partition of the subcontinent, with the first wave being composed largely of Bengali Hindu refugees arriving during and shortly after the establishment of India and Pakistan in 1947–1951. Between the period of first patches (1946–1951), around 274,455 Bengali Hindu refugees arrived from what modern Bangladesh (known as East Pakistan back then) in various locations of Assam as permanent settlers; in the second patches between 1952 and 1958, around 212,000 Bengali Hindus from Bangladesh took shelter in various parts of the state permanently. After the 1964 East Pakistan riots many Bengali Hindus poured into Assam as refugees, and the number of Hindu migrants in the state rose to 1,068,455 in 1968. The fourth patches, numbering around 347,555, arrived after the Bangladesh liberation war of 1971 as refugees; most of them, being Bengali-speaking Hindus, decided to stay in Assam permanently afterwards. Though the governments of India and Bangladesh made agreements for the repatriation of certain groups of refugees after the second and third waves, a large presence of refugees and other migrants and their descendants remained in the state. In the early 21st century, reports of about 635 of Bangladeshi people, mostly Hindus, immigrate to Assam on daily were reported.

Besides migration caused by displacement, there is also a large and continual unregulated movement between Assam and neighbouring regions of Bangladesh with an exceptionally porous border. The situation is called a risk to Assam's as well as India's security. The continual illegal entry of people into Assam, mostly from Bangladesh, has caused economic upheaval and social and political unrest. During the Assam Movement (1979–1985), the All Assam Students Union (AASU) and others demanded that government stop the influx of immigrants and deport those who had already settled. During this period, 855 people (the AASU says 860) died in various conflicts with migrants and police. The 1983 Illegal Migrants (Determination by Tribunal) Act, applied only to Assam, decreed that any person who entered the Assam after Bangladesh declared independence from Pakistan in 1971 and without authorisation or travel documents is to be considered a foreigner, with the decision on foreigner status to be carried out by designated tribunals. In 1985, the Indian Government and leaders of the agitation signed the Assam accord to settle the conflict.

The 1991 census made the changing demographics of border districts more visible. Since 2010, the Indian Government has undertaken the updating of the National Register of Citizens for Assam, and in 2018 the 32.2 million residents of Assam were subject to a review of their citizenship. In August 2019, India released the names of the 2 million residents of Assam that had been determined to be non-citizens and whose names had therefore been struck off the Register of Citizens, depriving them of rights and making them subject to action, and potentially leaving some of them stateless, and the government has begun deporting non-citizens, while detaining 1,000 others that same year.

In January 2019, the Assam's peasant organisation Krishak Mukti Sangram Samiti (KMSS) claimed that there are around 20 lakh Hindu Bangladeshis in Assam who would become Indian citizens if the Citizenship (Amendment) Bill is passed. BJP, however claimed that only eight lakh Hindu Bangladeshis will get citizenship. According to various sources, the total number of illegal Hindu Bangladeshis is hard to ascertain. According to the census data, the number of Hindu immigrants have been largely exaggerated.

In February 2020, the Assam Minority Development Board announced plans to segregate illegal Bangladeshi Muslim immigrants from the indigenous Muslims of the state, though some have expressed problems in identifying an indigenous Muslim person. According to the board, there are 1.4 crore Muslims in the state, of which 1 crore are of Bangladeshi origin. A report reveals that out of total 33 districts in Assam, Bangladeshis dominate almost 15 districts of Assam.

=== Floods ===
In the rainy season every year, the Brahmaputra and other rivers overflow their banks and flood adjacent land. Flood waters wash away property including houses and livestock. Damage to crops and fields harms the agricultural sector. Bridges, railway tracks, and roads are also damaged, harming transportation and communication, and in some years requiring food to be air-dropped to isolated towns. Some deaths are attributed to the floods.

=== Unemployment ===
Unemployment is a chronic problem in Assam. It is variously blamed on poor infrastructure, limited connectivity, and government policy; on a "poor work culture"; on failure to advertise vacancies; and on government hiring candidates from outside Assam.

== Education ==
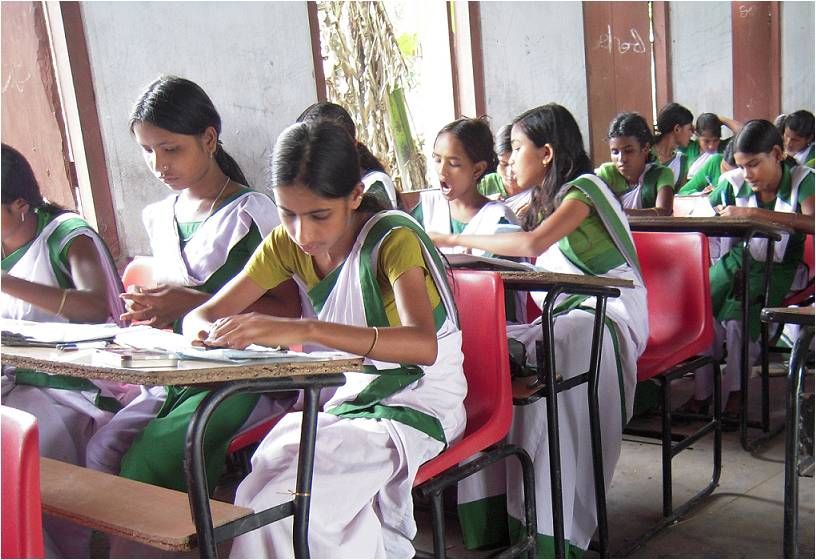
School girls in the classroom, Lakhiganj High School, Assam

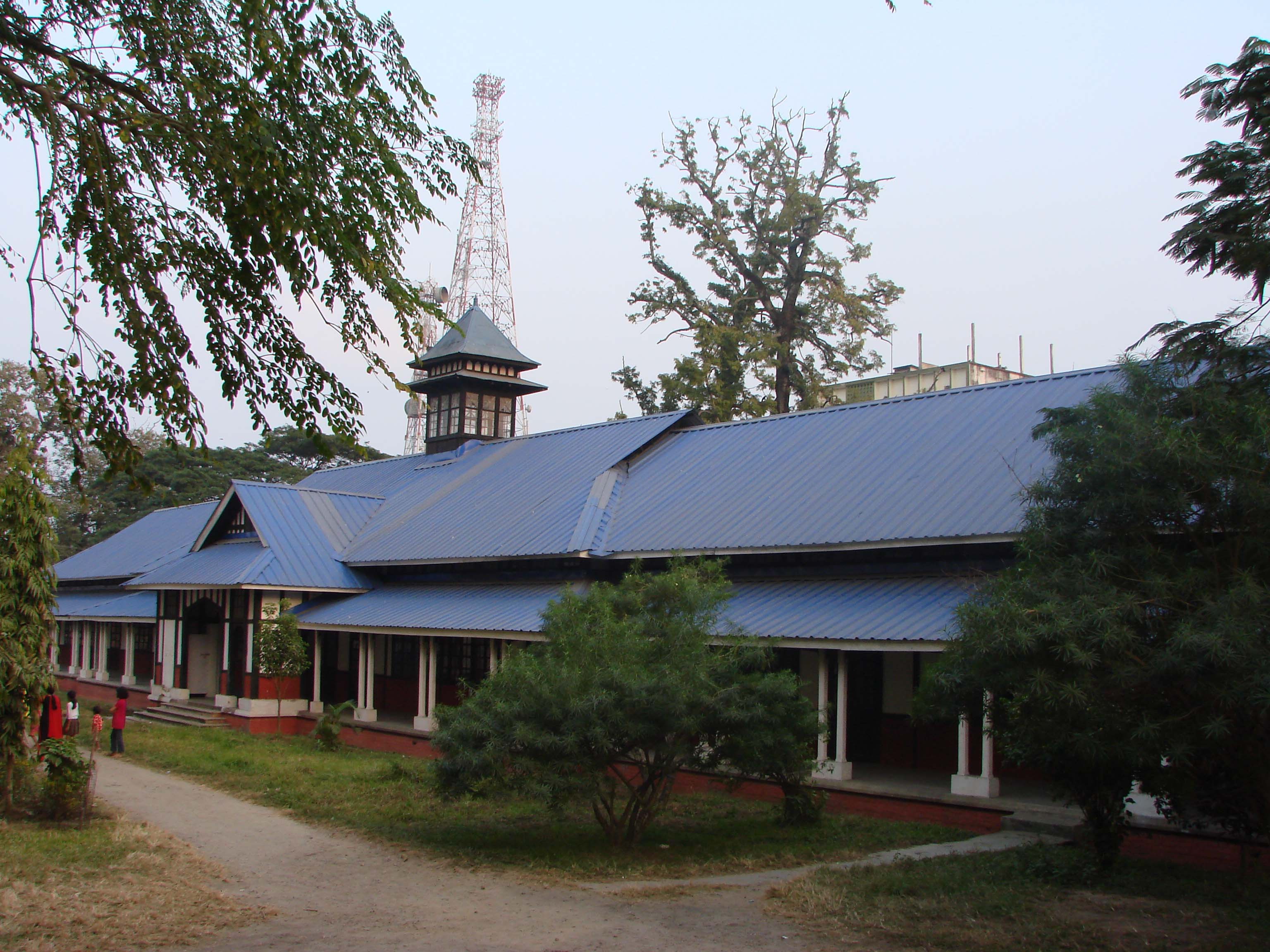
Cotton University, Guwahati

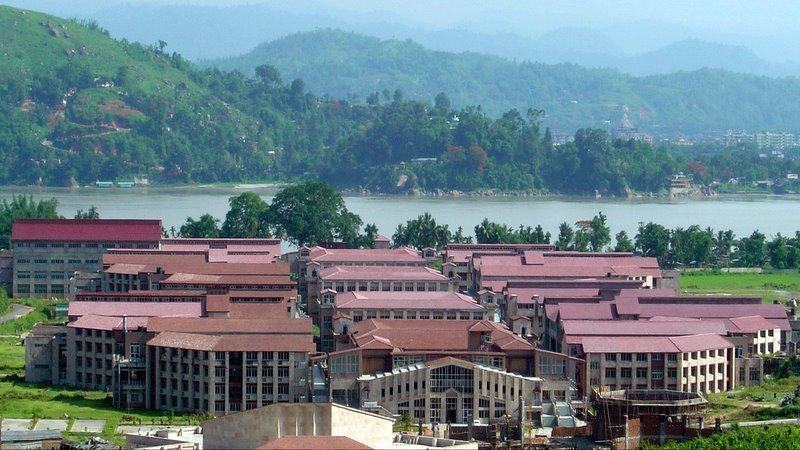
Academic complex of IIT Guwahati

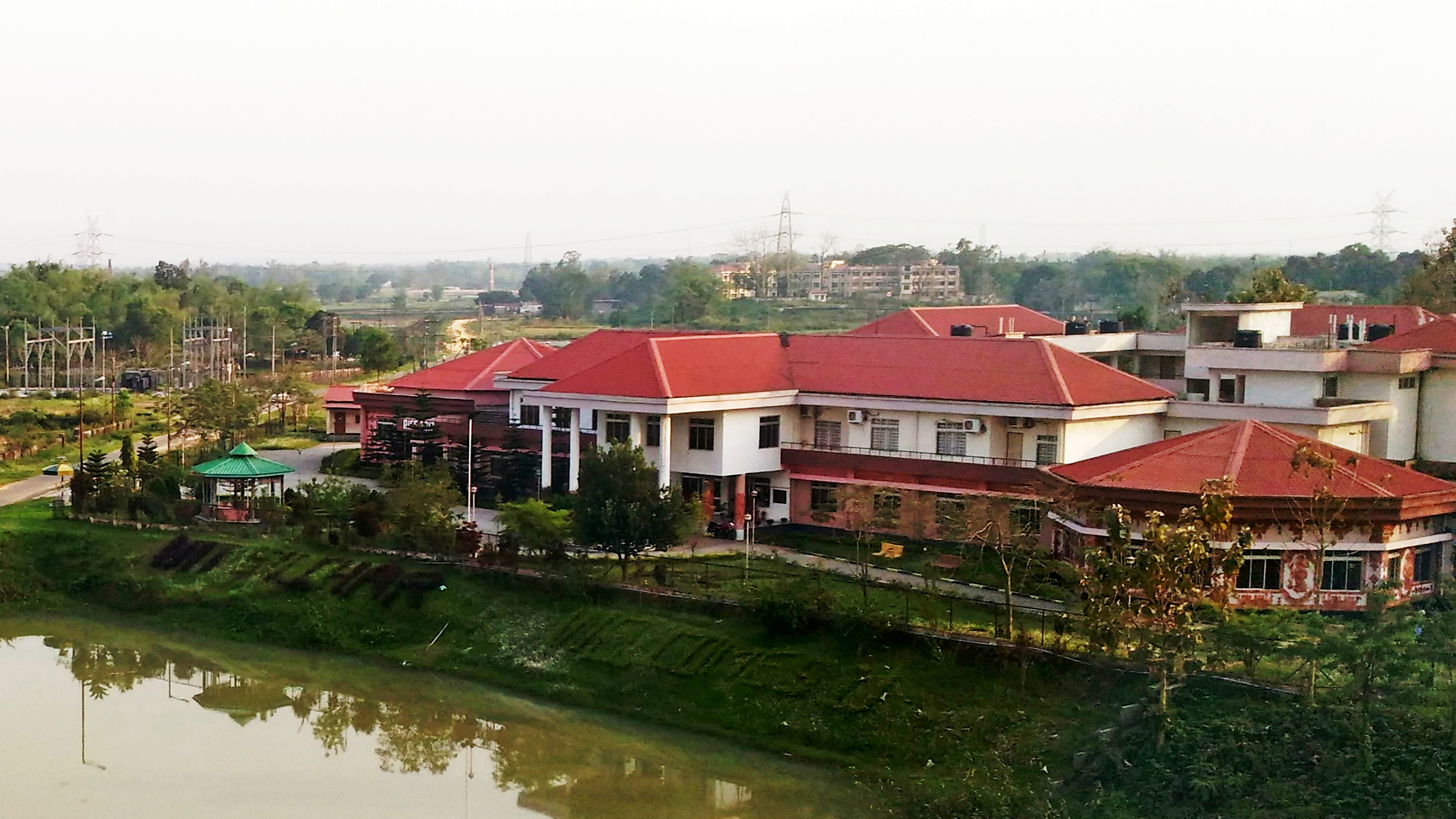
National Institute of Technology, Silchar

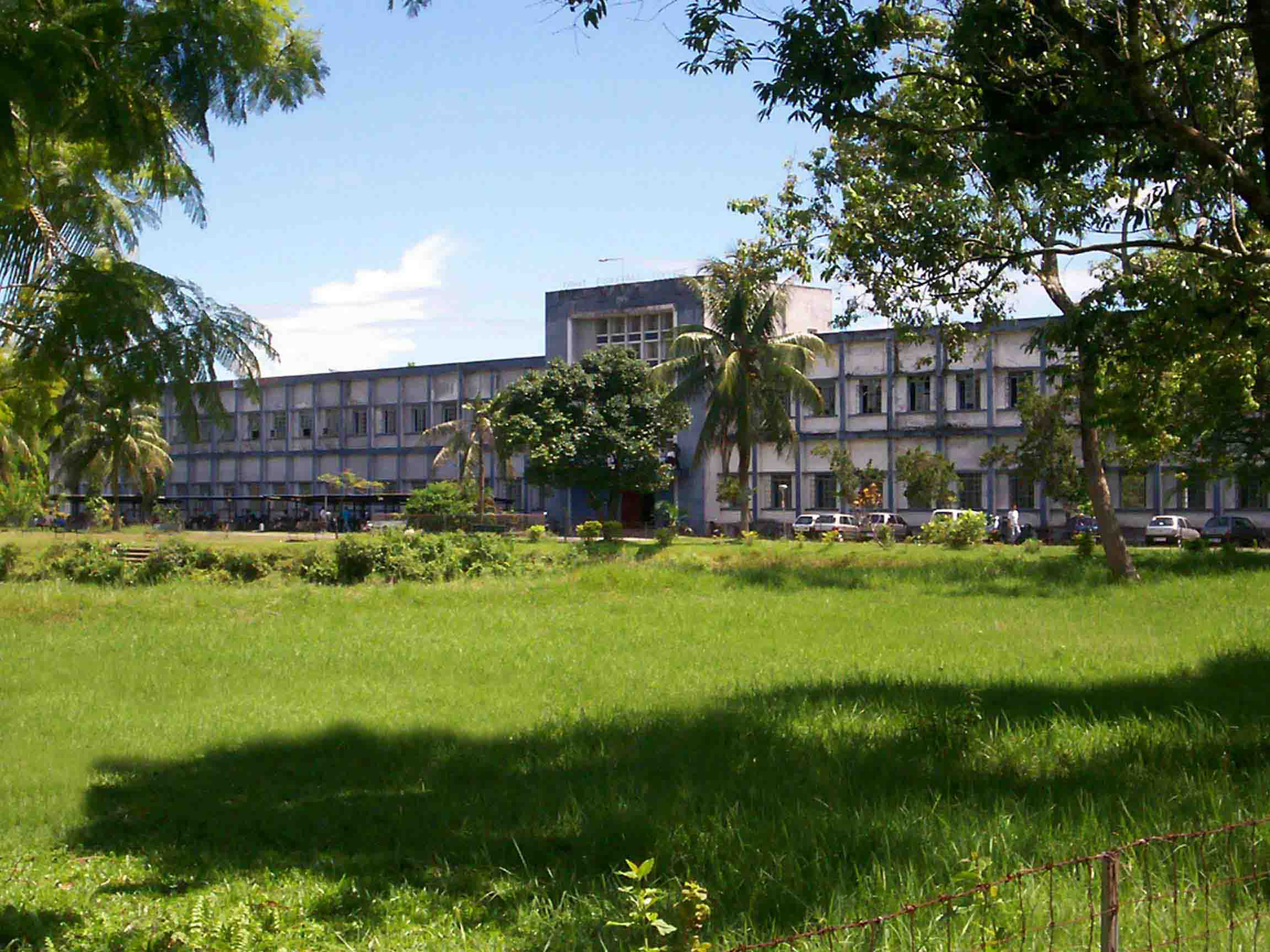
Jorhat Engineering College of Assam Science and Technology University

Universities, colleges and institutions include:

=== Universities ===
- Assam University
- Assam Agricultural University, Jorhat
- Assam Don Bosco University,
- Assam down town University,
- Assam Science and Technology University, Guwahati
- Assam Women's University, Jorhat
- Birangana Sati Sadhani Rajyik Vishwavidyalaya
- Cotton University, Guwahati
- Dibrugarh University, Dibrugarh
- Gauhati University, Guwahati
- Kaziranga University, Jorhat
- Krishna Kanta Handique State Open University
- Kumar Bhaskar Varma Sanskrit and Ancient Studies University
- Mahapurusha Srimanta Sankaradeva Viswavidyalaya
- National Law University and Judicial Academy, Assam
- Royal Global University
- Srimanta Sankaradeva University of Health Sciences
- Tezpur University, Tezpur

=== Medical colleges ===
- AIIMS, Guwahati
- Assam Medical College, Dibrugarh
- Gauhati Medical College and Hospital, Guwahati
- Jorhat Medical College and Hospital, Jorhat
- Diphu Medical College and Hospital, Diphu
- Lakhimpur Medical college and Hospital, Lakhimpur
- Silchar Medical College and Hospital, Silchar
- Tezpur Medical College Tezpur
- Fakhruddin Ali Ahmed Medical College, Barpeta
- Nagaon Medical College and Hospital, Nagaon
- Kokrajhar Medical College and Hospital, Kokrajhar
- Dhubri Medical College and Hospital, Dhubri
- Regional Dental College, Guwahati

Assam has 12 medical colleges at present with 4 more scheduled to be completed by 2026–27.

=== Engineering and technological colleges ===
- Indian Institute of Technology in Guwahati
- Indian Institute of Information Technology, Guwahati
- National Institute of Technology, Silchar,
- Assam Engineering College, Guwahati
- Assam Science and Technology University
- Bineswar Brahma Engineering College, Kokrajhar
- Central Institute of Technology, Kokrajhar
- Jorhat Engineering College, Jorhat
- Jorhat Institute of Science & Technology, Jorhat
- NETES Institute of Technology & Science Mirza,
- Barak Valley Engineering College Nirala Karimganj
- Golaghat Engineering College, Golaghat
- Dhemaji Engineering College, Dhemaji

== Economy ==
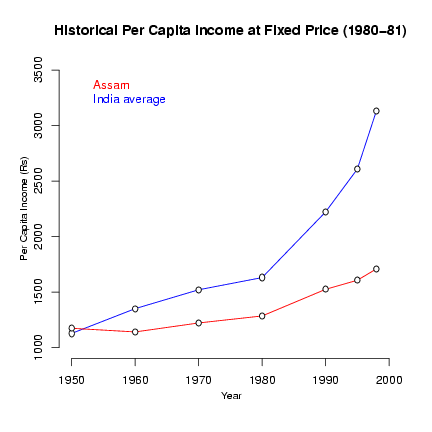
Per capita income of Assam since 1950

Assam's economy is based on agriculture and oil. Assam produces more than half of India's tea. The Assam-Arakan basin holds about a quarter of the country's oil reserves, and produces about 12% of its total petroleum. According to the recent estimates, Assam's per capita GDP is ₹6,157 at constant prices (1993–94) and ₹10,198 at current prices; almost 40% lower than that in India. According to the recent estimates, per capita income in Assam has reached ₹6756 (1993–94 constant prices) in 2004–05, which is still much lower than India's.

=== Macro-economy ===
Between 1951 and 1979, Assam registered an average level of real gross domestic product growth compared to the national average. However, the state's real GDP growth lagged behind the national average after 1979 due to socio-political instability. Between 1981 and 2001, Assam's GSDP increased 3.3 per cent annually compared to the national average of 6 per cent. Since the 2000s, Assam has registered higher levels of real gross domestic product growth. GSDP at constant (1999-2000) prices increased 5.33 per cent annually between 2002 and 2007. Real GSDP increased 6.78 per cent annually between 2007 and 2012. Real GSDP at constant (2011-12) prices increased approximately 7.6 per cent annually between 2012 and 2016. Real GSDP at constant (2011-12) prices increased approximately 7.0 per cent annually between 2016 and 2025.

=== Tea plantations ===
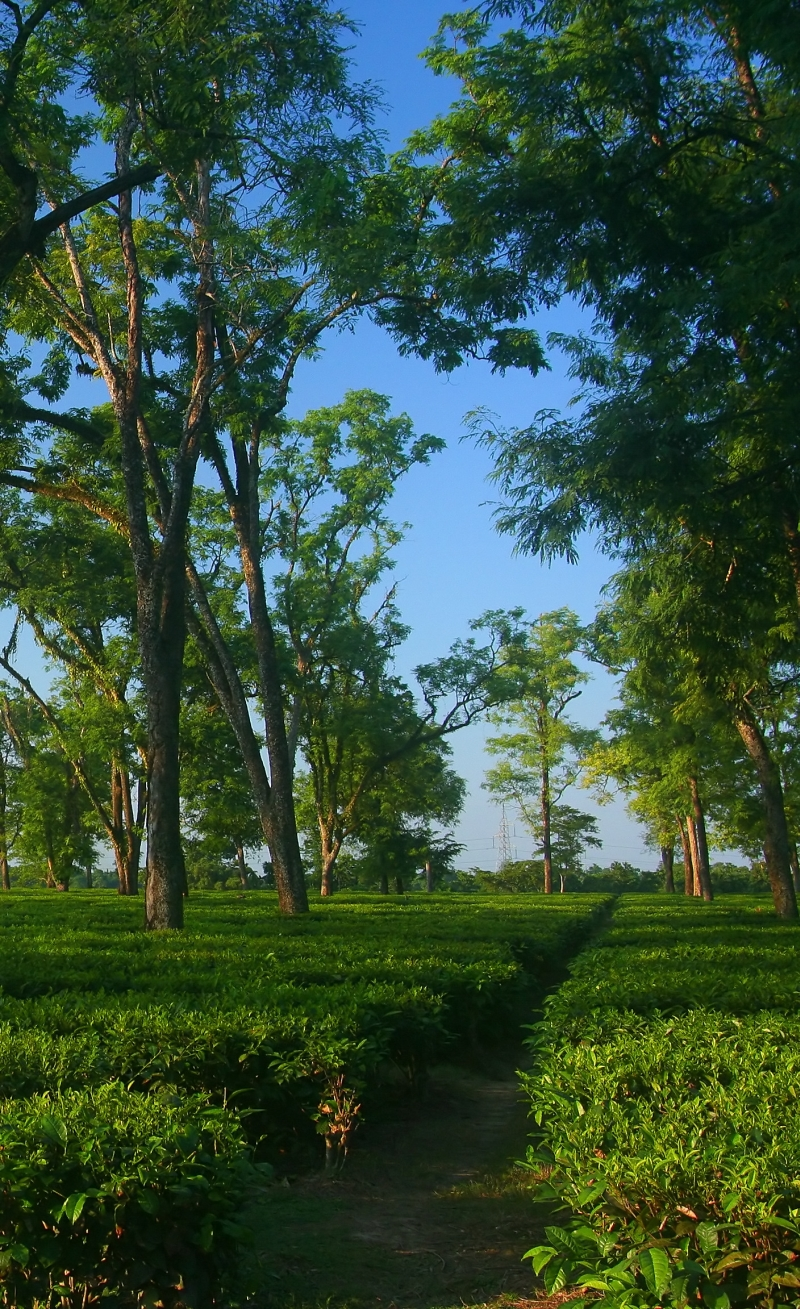
A tea garden in Assam: tea is grown at elevations near sea level, giving it a malty sweetness and an earthy flavor, as opposed to the more floral aroma of highland (e.g. Darjeeling, Taiwanese) teas

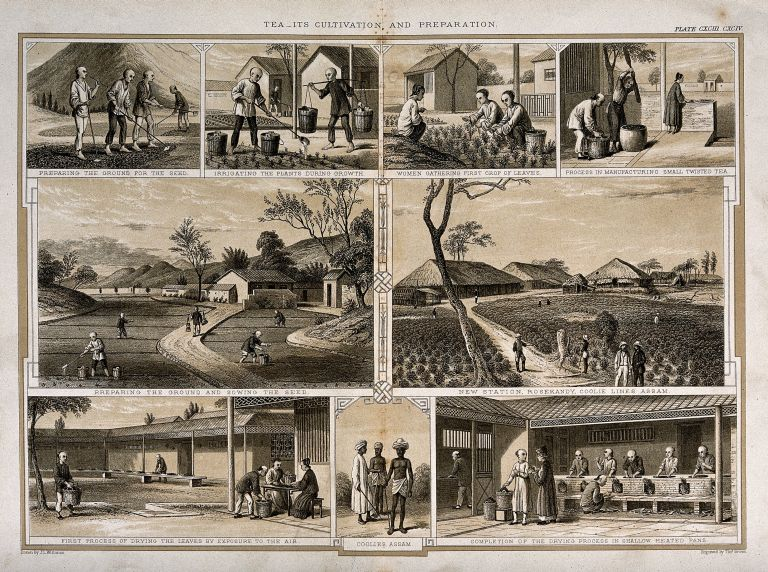
This 1850 engraving shows the different stages in the process of making tea in Assam

=== Employment ===
Unemployment is one of the major problems in Assam. This problem can be attributed to overpopulation and a faulty education system. Every year, large numbers of students obtain higher academic degrees but because of non-availability of proportional vacancies, most of these students remain unemployed. A number of employers hire over-qualified or efficient, but under-certified, candidates, or candidates with narrowly defined qualifications. The problem is exacerbated by the growth in the number of technical institutes in Assam which increases the unemployed community of the State. The reluctance on the part of the departments concerned to advertise vacancies in vernacular language has also made matters worse for local unemployed youths particularly for the job-seekers of Grade C and D vacancies.

Reduction of the unemployed has been threatened by illegal immigration from Bangladesh. This has increased the workforce without a commensurate increase in jobs. Immigrants compete with local workers for jobs at lower wages, particularly in construction, domestics, Rickshaw-pullers, and vegetable sellers. The government has been identifying (via NRC) and deporting illegal immigrants. Continued immigration is exceeding deportation.

=== Agriculture ===
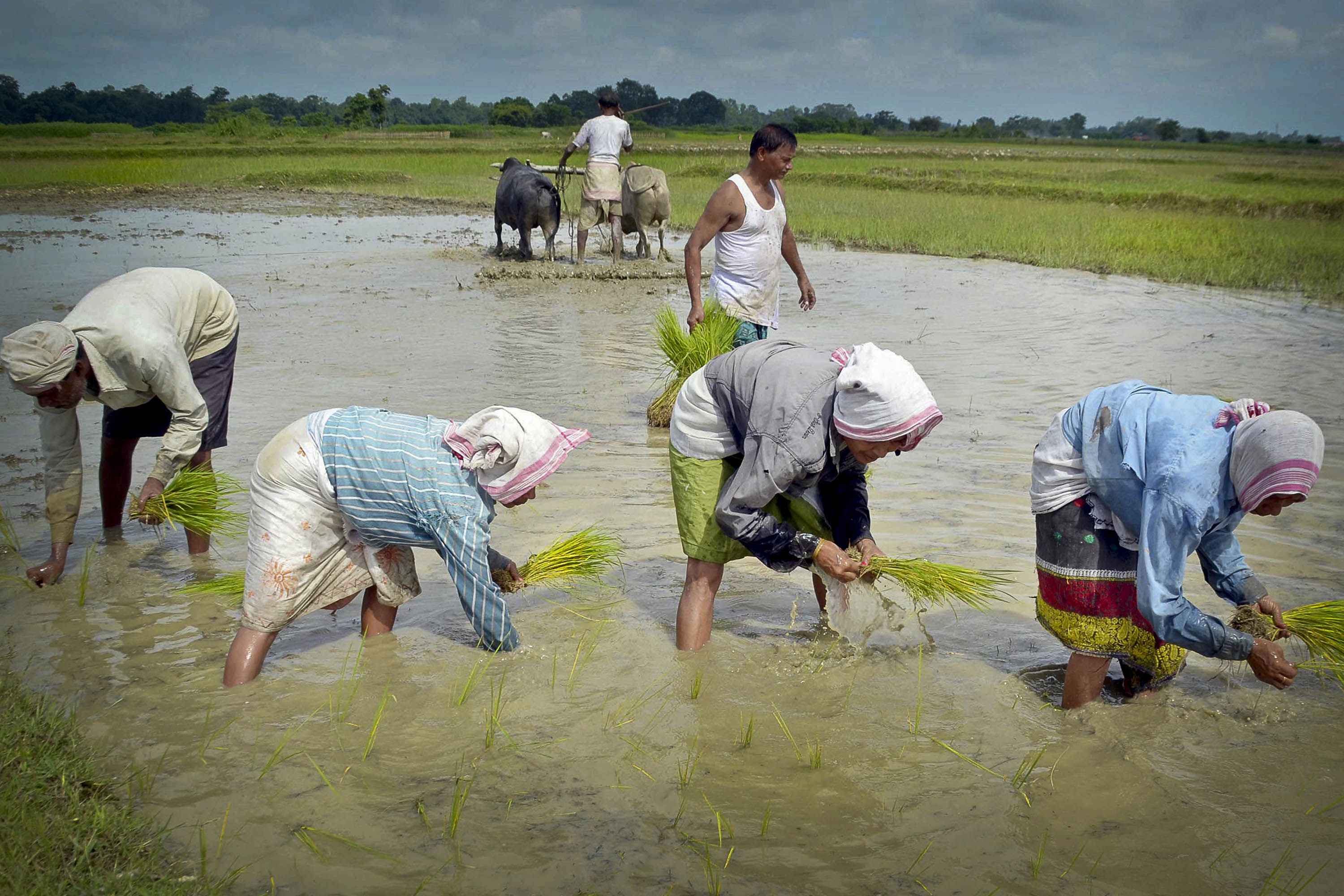
Assamese women busy planting paddy seedlings in their agricultural field in Pahukata village in the Nagaon district of Assam

In Assam among all the productive sectors, agriculture makes the highest contribution to its domestic sectors, accounting for more than a third of Assam's income and employs 69% of workforce. Assam's biggest contribution to the world is Assam tea. It has its own variety, Camellia sinensis var. assamica. The state produces rice, rapeseed, mustard seed, jute, potato, sweet potato, banana, papaya, areca nut, sugarcane and turmeric.

Assam's agriculture is yet to experience modernisation in a real sense. With implications for food security, per capita food grain production has declined in the past five decades. Productivity has increased marginally, but is still low compared to highly productive regions. On the other hand, after having strong domestic demand, and with 1.5 million hectares of inland water bodies, numerous rivers and 165 varieties of fishes, fishing is still in its traditional form and production is not self-sufficient.

Floods in Assam greatly affect the farmers and the families dependent on agriculture because of large-scale damage of agricultural fields and crops by flood water. Every year, flooding from the Brahmaputra and other rivers deluges places in Assam. The water levels of the rivers rise because of rainfall resulting in the rivers overflowing their banks and engulfing nearby areas. Apart from houses and livestock being washed away by flood water, bridges, railway tracks and roads are also damaged by the calamity, which causes communication breakdown in many places. Fatalities are also caused by the natural disaster in many places of the state.

=== Infrastructure ===
On 30 August 2023, Maligaon Flyover was inaugurated. The flyover is Assam's longest flyover, spanning 2.63 kilometres and connecting Maligaon Chariali to Kamakhya Gate in Guwahati.

=== Industry ===
Handlooms and handicrafts are traditional industries that continue to survive, especially among rural women, in the state.

Assam's proximity to some neighbouring countries such as Bangladesh, Nepal and Bhutan, benefits its trade. The major Border checkpoints through which border trade flows to Bangladesh from Assam are : Sutarkandi (Karimganj), Dhubri, Mankachar (Dhubri) and Golokanj. To facilitate border trade with Bangladesh, Border Trade Centres have been developed at Sutarkandi and Mankachar. It has been proposed in the 11th five-year plan to set up two more Border Trade Center, one at Ledo connecting China and other at Darrang connecting Bhutan. There are several Land Custom Stations (LCS) in the state bordering Bangladesh and Bhutan to facilitate border trade.

The government of India has identified some thrust areas for industrial development of Assam:

- Petroleum and natural gas-based industries
- Industries based on locally available minerals
- Processing of plantation crops
- Food processing industries
- Agri-Horticulture products
- Herbal products
- Biotech products
- Pharmaceuticals
- Chemical and plastic-based industries
- Export oriented industries
- Electronic and IT base industries including services sector
- Paper making industries
- Textiles and sericulture
- Engineering industries
- Cane and bamboo-based industries
- Other handicrafts industry

Although, the region in the eastern periphery of India is landlocked and is linked to the mainland by the narrow Siliguri Corridor (or the Chicken's Neck) improved transport infrastructure in all the three modes – rail, road and air – and developing urban infrastructure in the cities and towns of Assam are giving a boost to the entire industrial scene. The Lokpriya Gopinath Bordoloi International Airport at Guwahati, with international flights to Bangkok and Singapore offered by Druk Air of Bhutan, was the 12th busiest airport of India in 2012. The cities of Guwahati in the west and Dibrugarh in the east with good rail, road and air connectivity are the two important nerve centres of Assam, to be selected by Asian Development Bank for providing $200 million for improvement of urban infrastructure.

Assam is a producer of crude oil and it accounts for about 15% of India's crude output, exploited by the Assam Oil Company Ltd., and natural gas in India. Oil was discovered in Makum in 1867, and oil drilling started in 1889. Most of the oilfields are located in the Eastern Assam region. Assam has four oil refineries in Digboi (Asia's first and world's second refinery), Guwahati, Bongaigaon and Numaligarh and with a total capacity of 7 million metric tonnes (7.7 million short tons) per annum. Asia's first refinery was set up at Digboi and discoverer of Digboi oilfield was the Assam Railways & Trading Company Limited (AR&T Co. Ltd.), a registered company of London in 1881. One of the biggest public sector oil company of the country Oil India Ltd. has its plant and headquarters at Duliajan.

There are several other industries, including a chemical fertiliser plant at Namrup, petrochemical industries in Namrup and Bongaigaon, paper mills at Jagiroad, Hindustan Paper Corporation Ltd. Township Area Panchgram and Jogighopa, sugar mills in Barua Bamun Gaon, Chargola, Kampur, cement plants in Bokajan and Badarpur, and a cosmetics plant of Hindustan Unilever (HUL) at Doom Dooma. Moreover, there are other industries such as jute mill, textile and yarn mills, Assam silk, and silk mills. Many of these industries are facing losses and closure due to lack of infrastructure and improper management practices.

=== Tourism ===
Wildlife, cultural, and historical destinations have attracted visitors.

== Culture ==
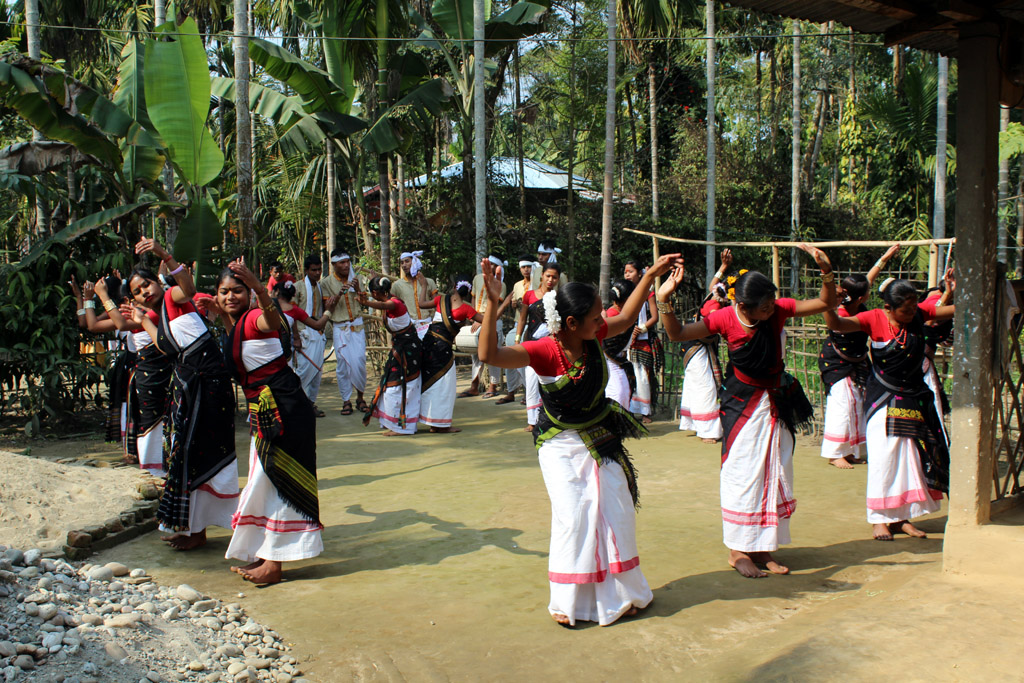
Moran bihu dance in the traditional attire of the Moran people on the occasion of Bohag Bihu

Assamese Culture is described as hybrid and syncretic in nature due to the assimilation of numerous ethnic groups and cultural practices of Austroasiatic, Tibeto-Burman, Indo-Aryan and Tai inhabitants. Therefore, both local elements or the local elements in Sanskritised forms are distinctly found. The major milestones in the evolution of Assamese culture are:

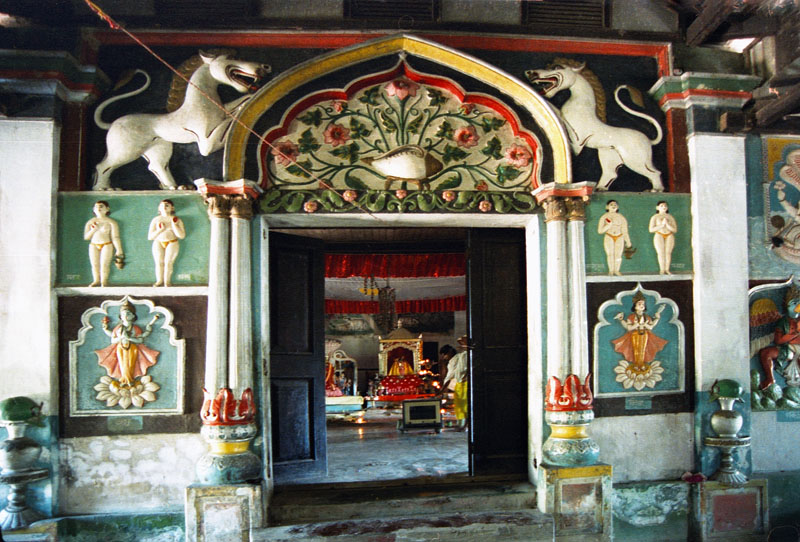
Dakhinpat Satra of Majuli

- Assimilation in the Kamarupa kingdom for almost 800 years (Varman dynasty for 300 years, Mlechchha dynasty for 250 years and the Pala dynasty for 200 years.
- Establishment of the Chutia kingdom in the 12th century in eastern Assam and assimilation for next 400 years.
- Establishment of the Ahom kingdom in the 13th century CE and assimilation for next 600 years.
- Assimilation in the Koch kingdom (15th–16th century CE) of western Assam and Kachari kingdom (12th–18th century CE) of central and southern Assam.
- Neo-Vaishanavite (Ekasarana Dharma) Movement led by Srimanta Shankardeva (Xongkordeu) made an enormous impact on the socio-cultural and religious sphere of Assam. This 15th century religio-cultural movement under the leadership of Srimanta Sankardeva (Xonkordeu) and his disciples have provided another dimension to Assamese culture. A renewed Hinduisation in local forms took place, which was initially greatly supported by the Koch and later by the Ahom kingdoms. The resultant social institutions such as namghar and sattra (the Vaishnav Monasteries) have become an integral part of the Assamese way of life. The movement contributed greatly towards language, literature, and performing and fine arts.. It was also an egalitarian reform movement as it broke away with the old caste barriers of Brahmanical Hinduism and converted into its fold people of all castes, ethnicity and religions (including Islam).

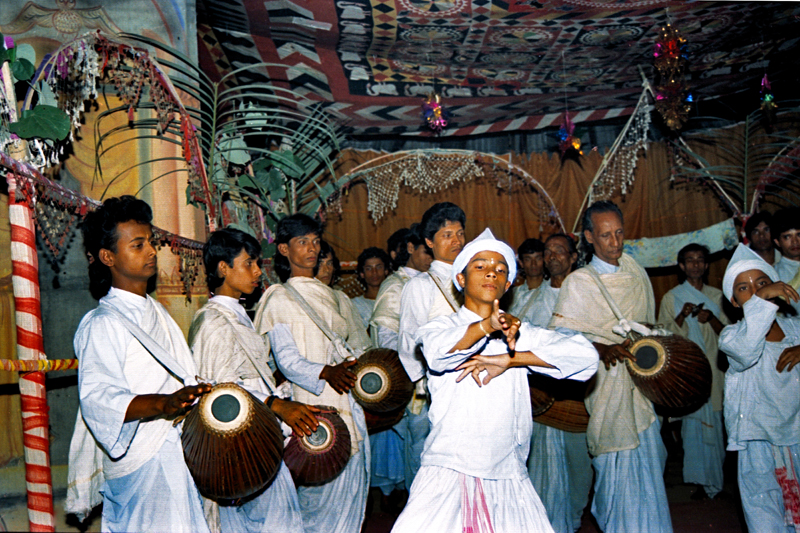
Presenting Gayan Bayan in Majuli, the Neo-Vaishnavite cultural heritage of Assam

The modern culture has been influenced by events in the British and the post-British era. Assamese language was standardised by American Baptist Missionaries such as Nathan Brown, Dr. Miles Bronson and local pundits such as Hemchandra Barua with the dialect spoken in undivided Sibsagar district (the centre of the Ahom kingdom) forming the standardised dialect.

Increasing efforts of standardisation in the 20th century alienated the localised forms present in different areas and with the less-assimilated ethno-cultural groups (many source-cultures). However, Assamese culture in its hybrid form and nature is one of the richest, still developing and in true sense is a 'cultural system' with sub-systems. Many source-cultures of the Assamese cultural-system are still surviving either as sub-systems or as sister entities, e.g. the; Bodo or Karbi or Mishing. It is important to keep the broader system closer to its roots and at the same time focus on development of the sub-systems.

Some of the common and unique cultural traits in the region are peoples' respect towards areca-nut and betel leaves, symbolic (gamosa, arnai, etc.), traditional silk garments (e.g. mekhela chador, traditional dress of Assamese women) and towards forefathers and elderly. Moreover, great hospitality and bamboo culture are common.

=== Symbols ===
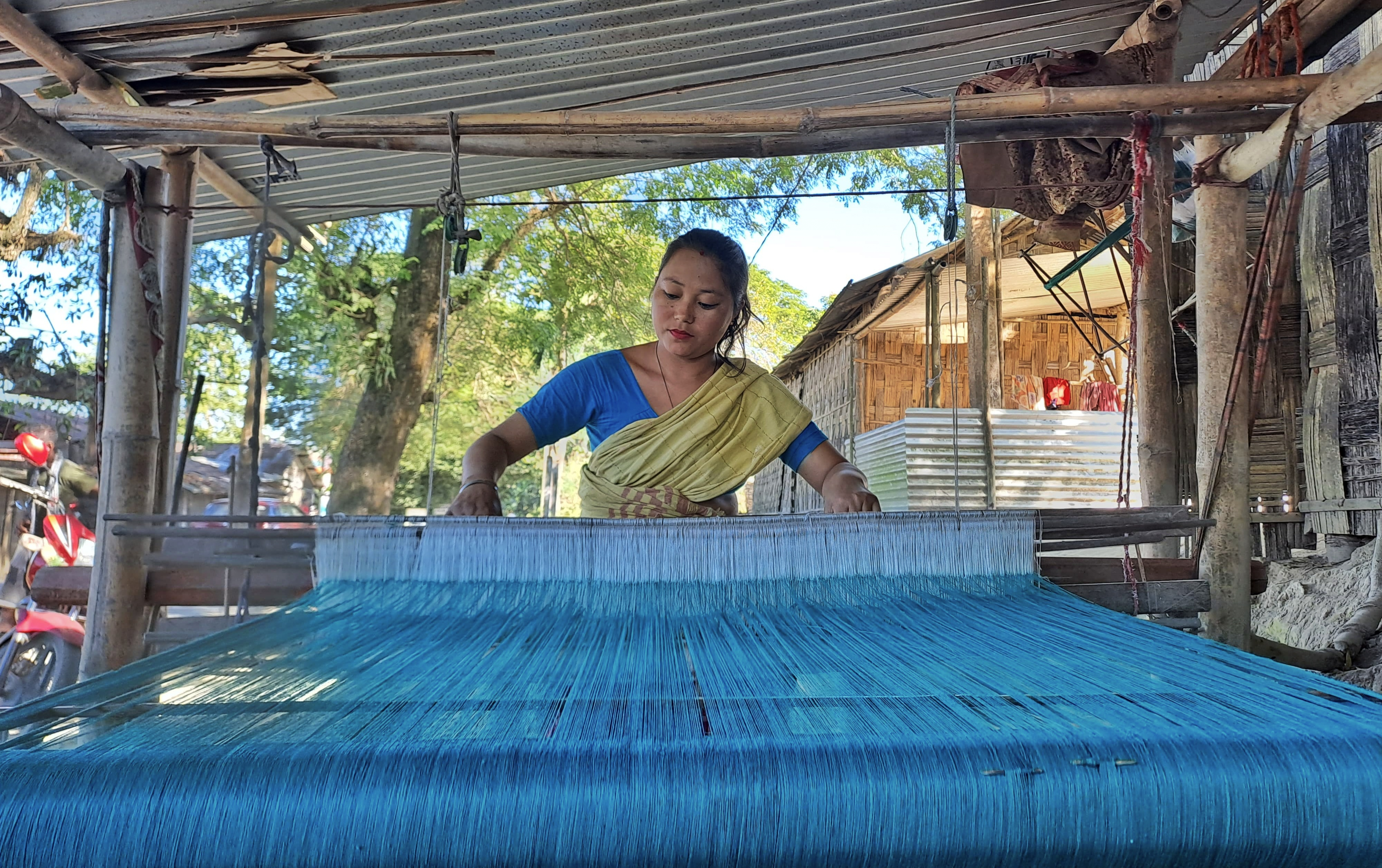
A Mising woman using a handloom to weave a traditional Mekhela chador dress.

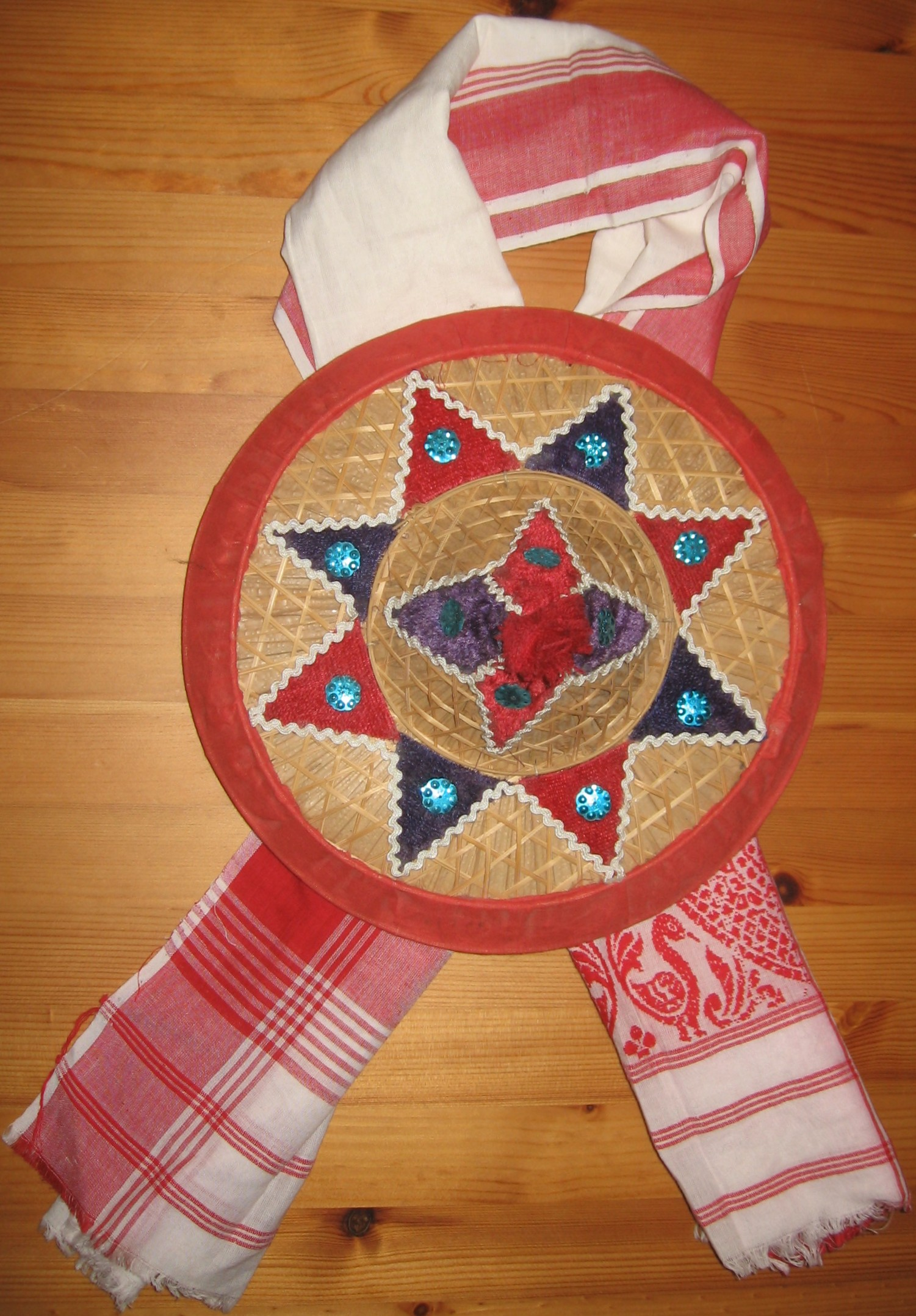
A decorative Assamese Jaapi laid over a Gamosa

Symbolism is an ancient cultural practice in Assam and is still a very important part of the Assamese way of life. Various elements are used to represent beliefs, feelings, pride, identity, etc.

Tamulpan (areca nut and betel leaves), Xorai and Gamosa are three important symbolic elements in Assamese culture. Tamulpan or guapan (gua from kwa) are considered along with the Gamosa (a typical woven cotton or silk cloth with embroidery) as the offers of devotion, respect and friendship. The Tamulpan-tradition is an ancient one and is being followed since time-immemorial with roots in the aboriginal Austric culture. Xorai is a traditionally manufactured bell-metal article of great respect and is used as a container-medium while performing respectful offers. Moreover, symbolically many ethno-cultural groups use specific clothes to portray respect and pride.

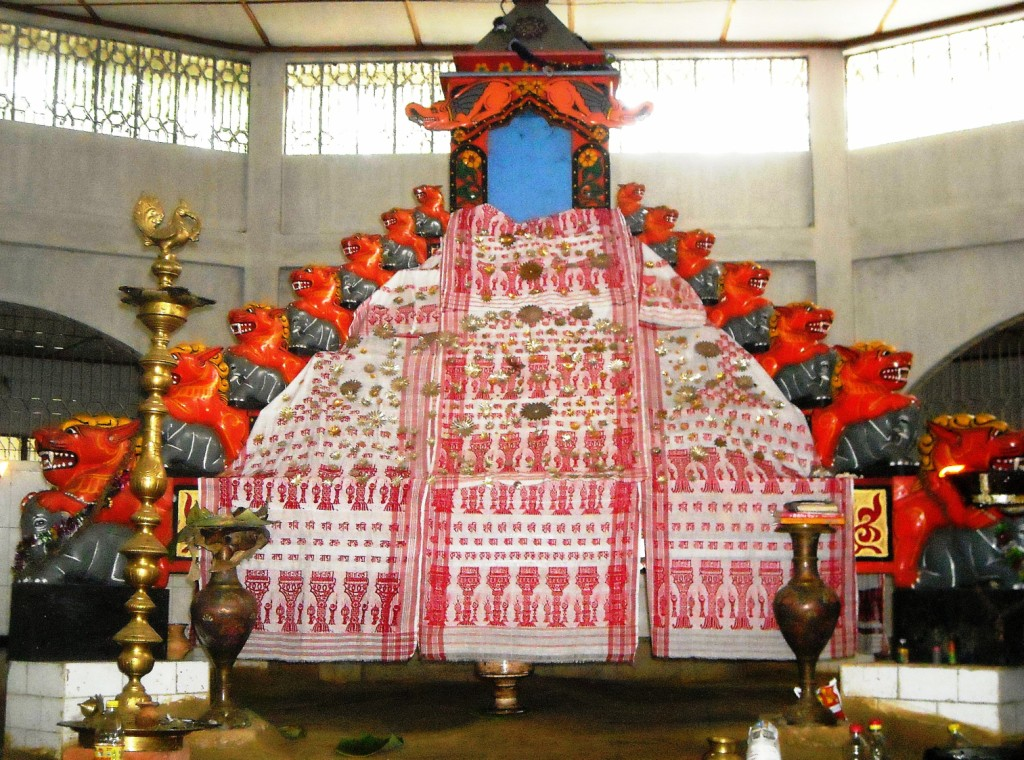
Singhasan of manikut in a Namghar

There were many other symbolic elements and designs, but are now only found in literature, art, sculpture, architecture, etc. or in use today for only religious purposes. The typical designs of Assamese-lion, dragon (ngi-ngao-kham), and flying-lion (Naam-singho) are used for symbolising various purposes and occasions. The archaeological sites such as the Madan Kamdev (c. 9th–10th centuries CE) exhibits mass-scale use of lions, dragon-lions and many other figures of demons to show case power and prosperity.

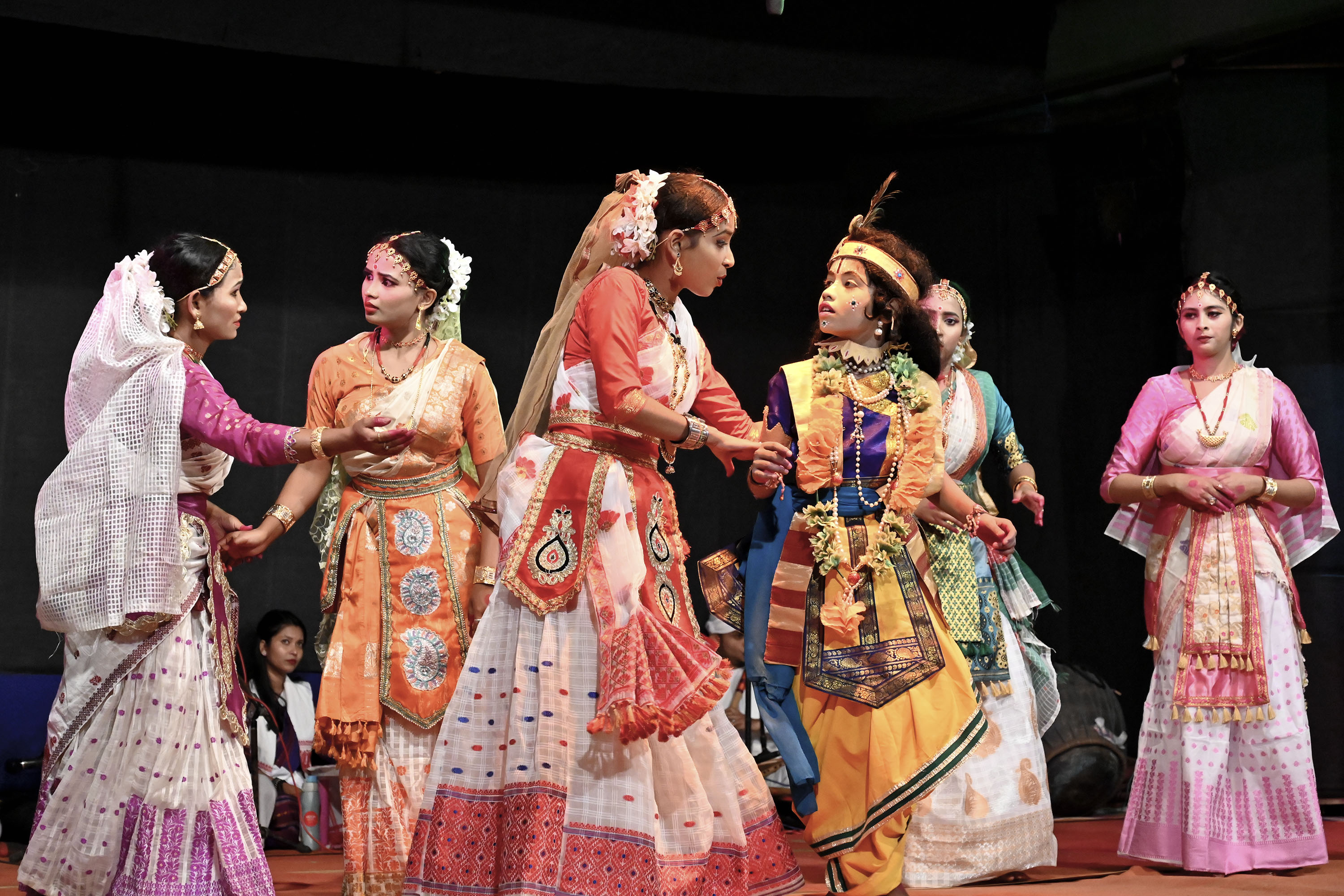
Jhumura

The Vaishnavite monasteries (Sattras) and many other architectural sites of the late medieval period display the use of lions and dragons for symbolic effects.

=== Festivals and traditions ===
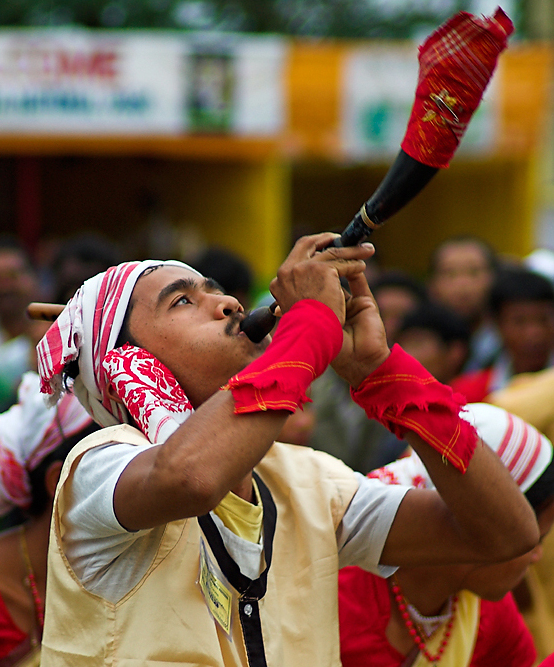
A Bihu dancer blowing a pepa (horn)

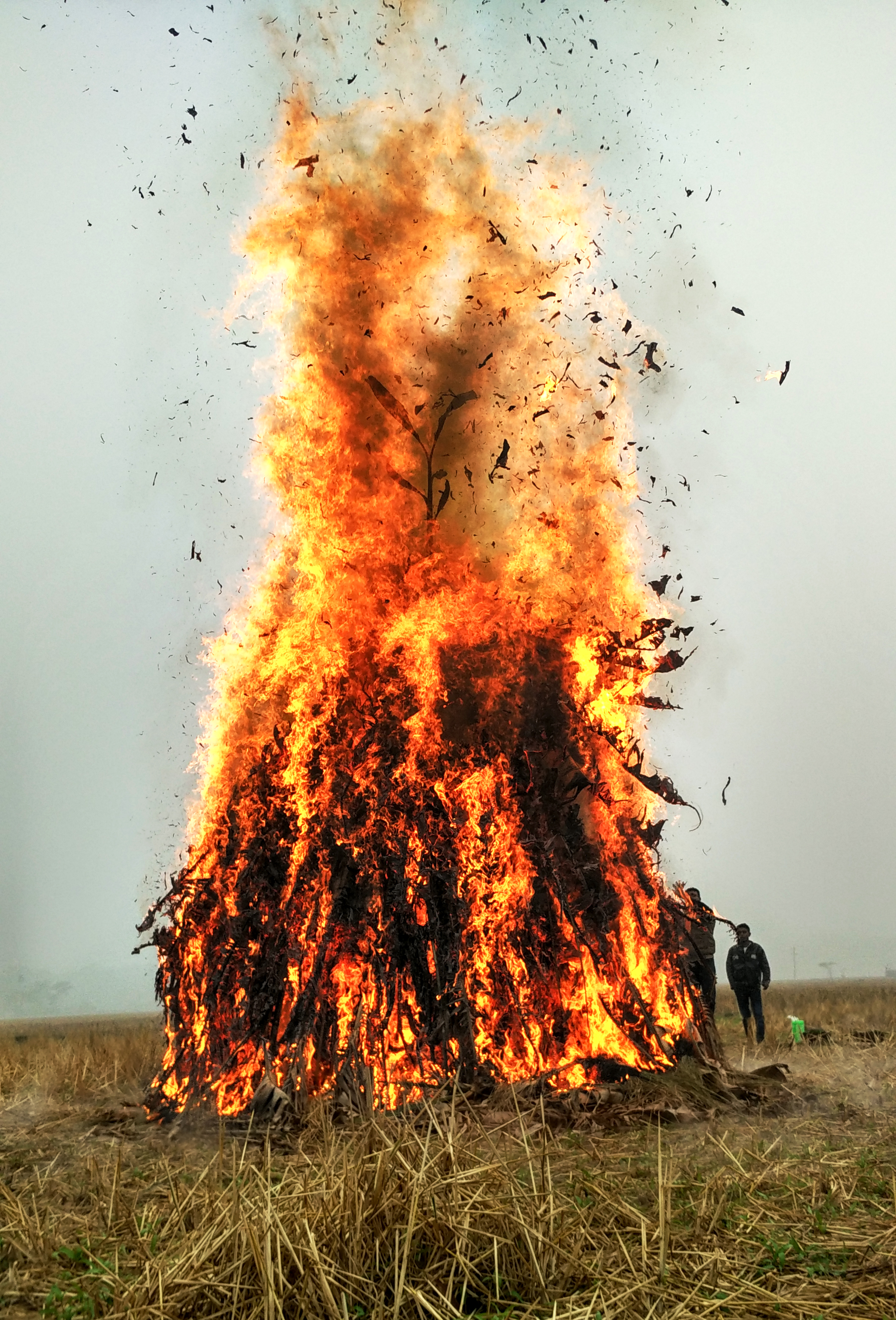
The burning of Meji (an offering to the god of fire) during the festival of Maghor bihu

A number of festivals are widely celebrated in Assam; the Assamese new year (Ek Bohag) is celebrated in April of the Gregorian calendar. Many ethnic festivals focus on the passage of time and seasons, with Ali-Aye-Ligang in February being a spring festivital associated with agriculture celebrated by the indigenous Mising. The Dimasa people celebrate Bushu Dima, a major harvest festival.

Bihu is considered to be the most important festival and is celebrated all over the state. It is a series of three prominent festivals each associated with a certain stage during the cultivation of paddy.

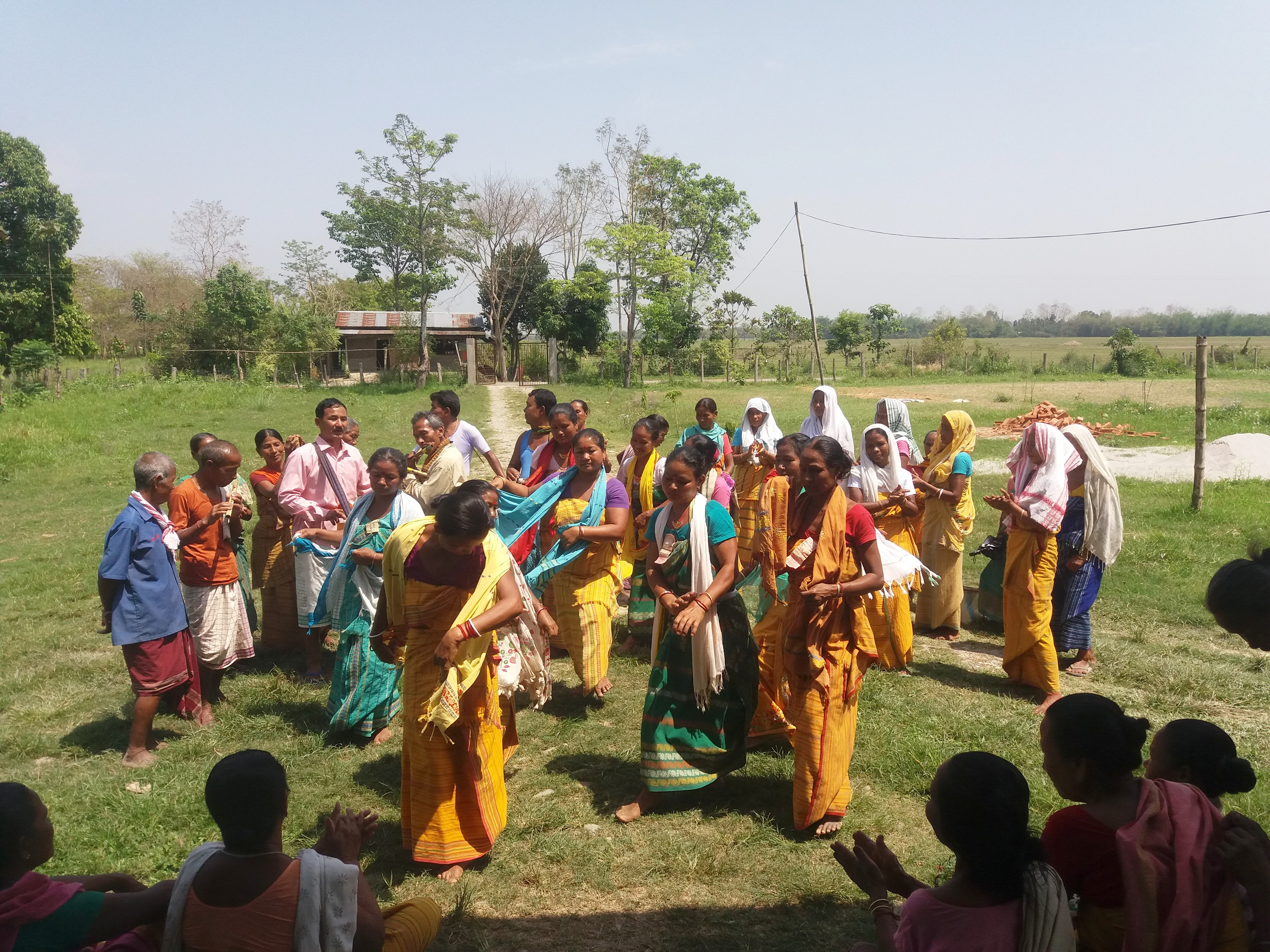
Traditional Bwisagu dance

Bwisagu is one of the most popular seasonal festivals of the Bodos, marking the beginning of the new year. It is celebrated at the beginning of the first month of the Boro year, around mid-April in the Gregorian Calendar. It has remarkable similarities to the festival of Rongali Bihu, also celebrated at the same time in Assam. The worship of Bathow is done on the second day of the festival.

Me-Dam-Me-Phi is the day of the veneration of the dead ancestors for the Tai-Ahom community.

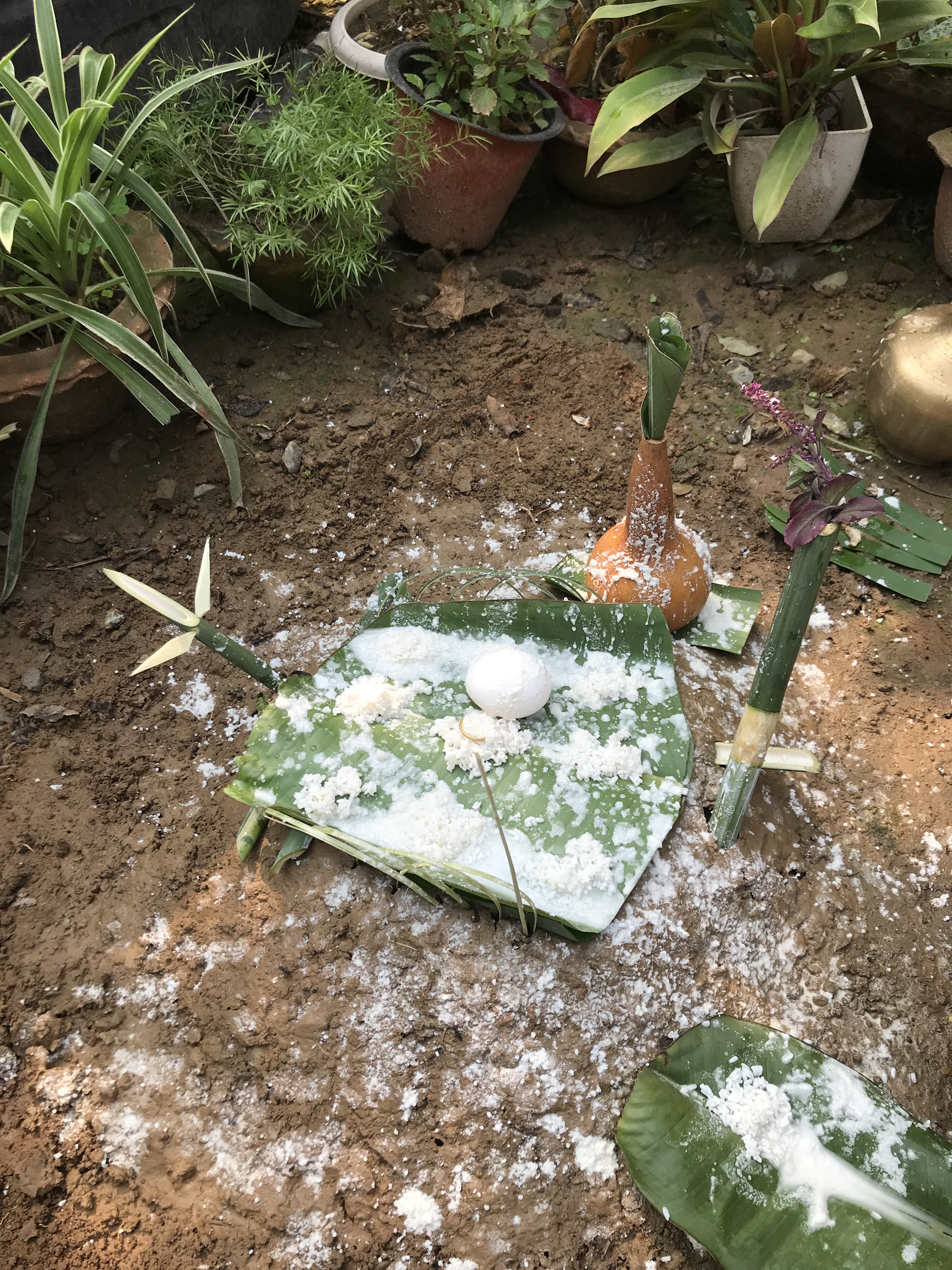
Rongker is celebrated every year by the Karbi people

Rongker is an annual winter festival of merriment celebrated by the Karbi people of Assam. It is observed in order to appease the local deities associated with the welfare of the village and the harvest of crops and also to get rid of all evil spirits. Although the festival does have a specific time it is usually observed at the beginning of the Karbi New year (Thang thang) which falls on February of the Gregorian calendar.

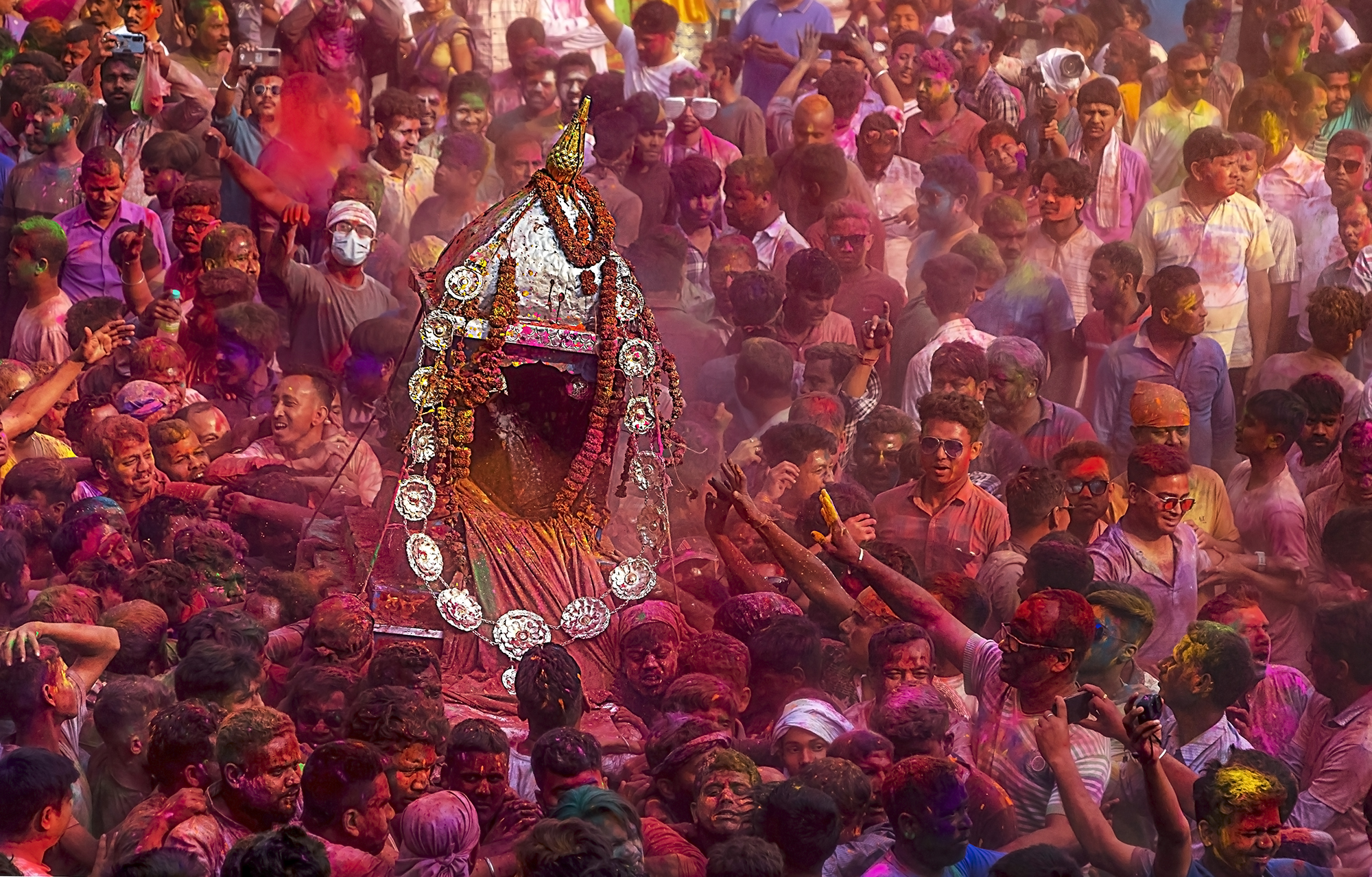
Doul Mohutsav (Holi) in Barpeta Satra

Doul Mohutsav, also called Fakuwa or Doul Utsav is a festival of colours and happiness popular in Lower Assam and especially in Barpeta. It is synonymous with the festival of Holi celebrated in Northern India.

Beshoma is a festival of Deshi people (one of the indigenous Muslim groups of Assam). It is a celebration of sowing crop. The Beshoma starts on the last day of Chaitra and goes on until the sixth of Baisakh. With varying locations it is also called Bishma or Chait-Boishne.

Moreover, there are other important traditional festivals being celebrated every year on different occasions at different places. Many of these are celebrated by different ethno-cultural groups:

- Wanshuwa Festival (by the Tiwas)
- Kherai (by the Bodos)
- Garja
- Bisu (by the Deori)
- Awnkham Gwrlwi Janai
- Chojun/Swarak
- Deusi Bhailo
- Sokk-erroi
- Hacha-kekan
- Hapsa Hatarnai
- Porag
- Bathow
- Wangala
- Bohuwa dance

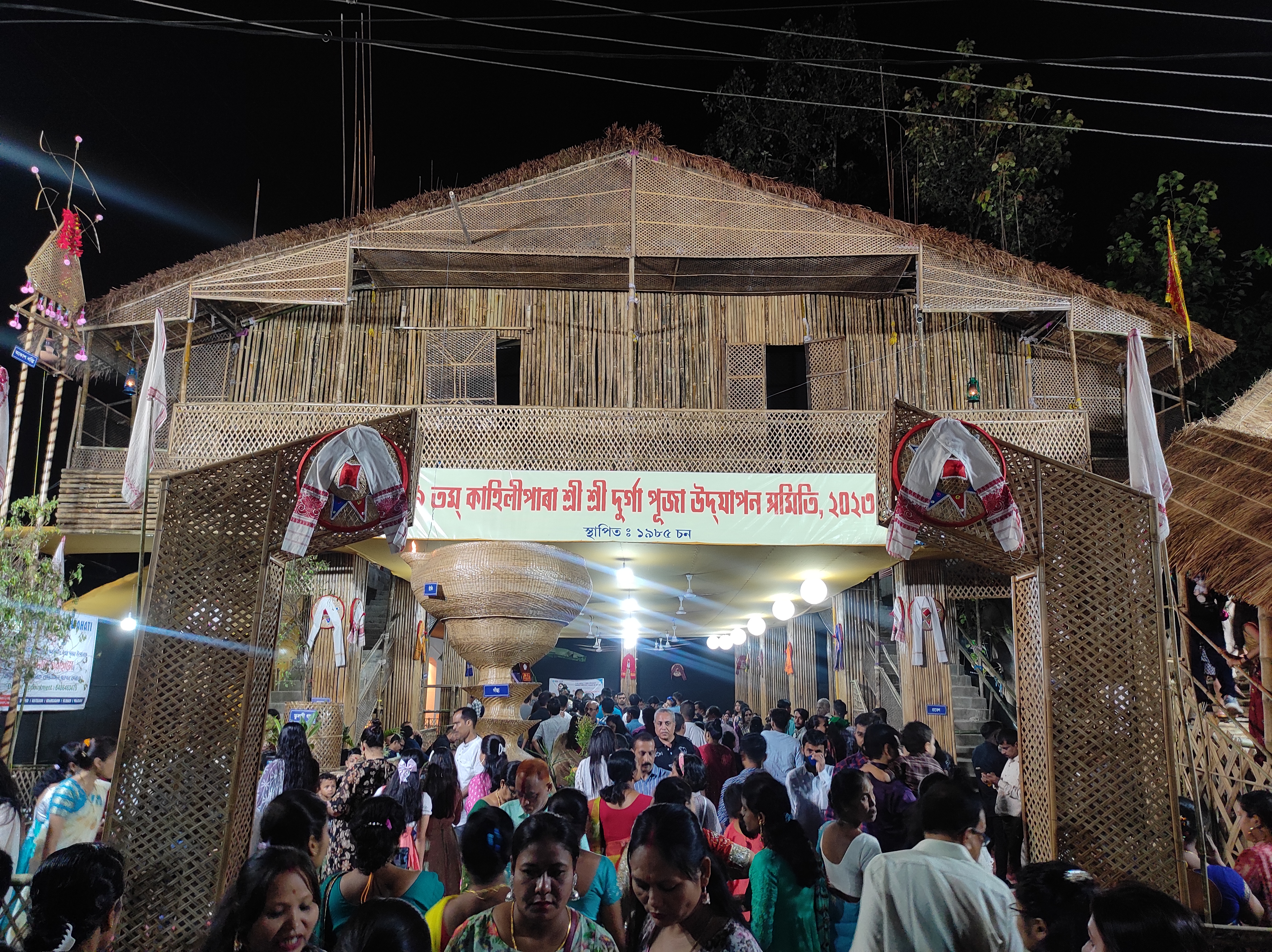
Durga puja in Guwahati.

Christmas is observed by Christians, and Durga Puja is widely celebrated across the state. Muslims celebrate two Eids (Eid ul-Fitr and Eid al-Adha).

Other few yearly celebrations are Brahmaputra Beach Festival, Guwahati, Kaziranga Elephant Festival, Kaziranga and Dehing Patkai Festival, Lekhapani, Karbi Youth Festival of Diphu and the International Jatinga Festival.

Asom Divas or Sukapha Divas (2 December) is celebrated to commemorate the advent of the first king of the Ahom kingdom in Assam after his journey over the Patkai Hills.

Lachit Divas (24 November) is celebrated on the birth anniversary of the great Ahom general Lachit Borphukan.

=== Music, dance, and drama ===
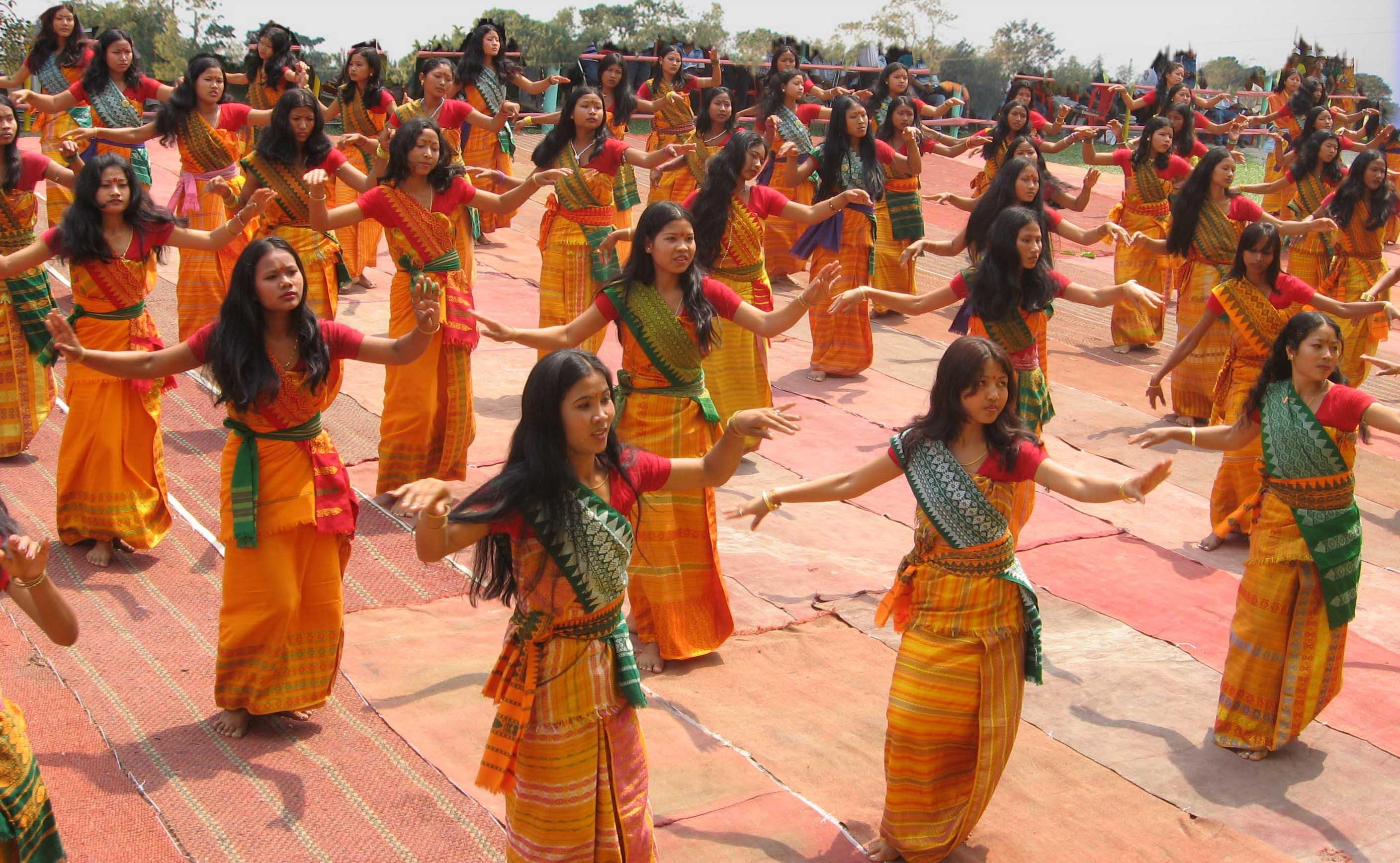
Bodo dance Bagurumba

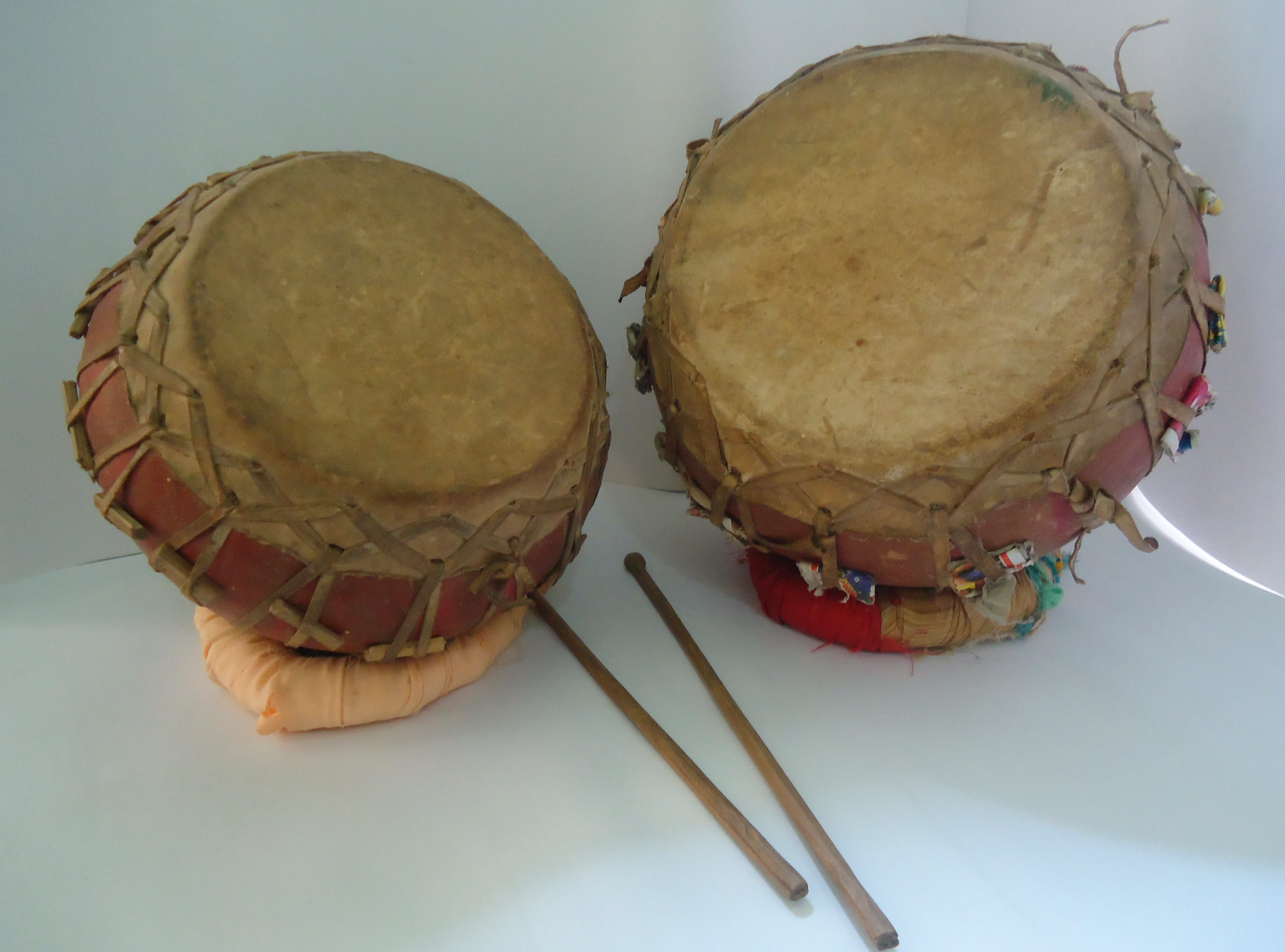
Nagara drums

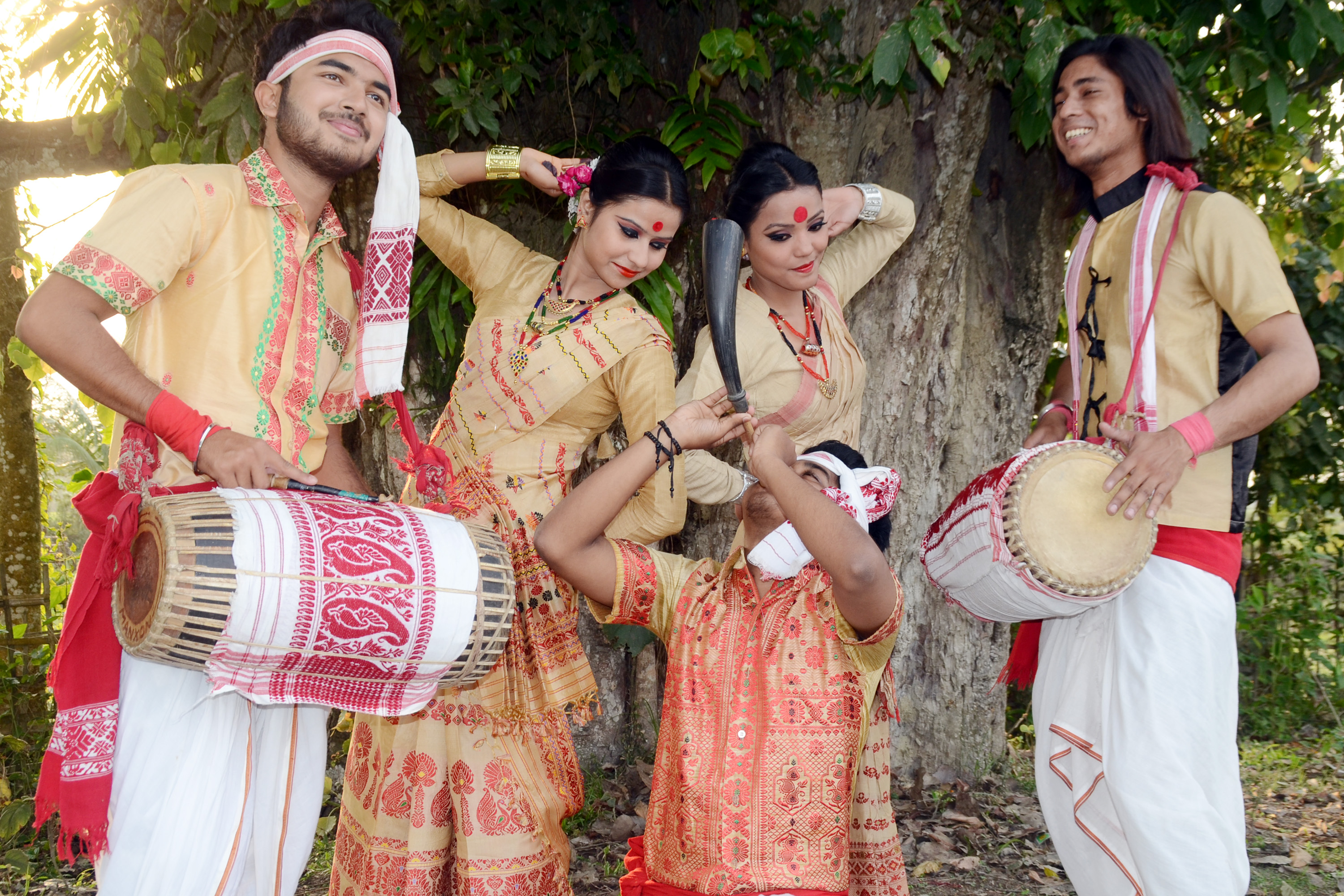
Assamese youth performing Bihu Dance

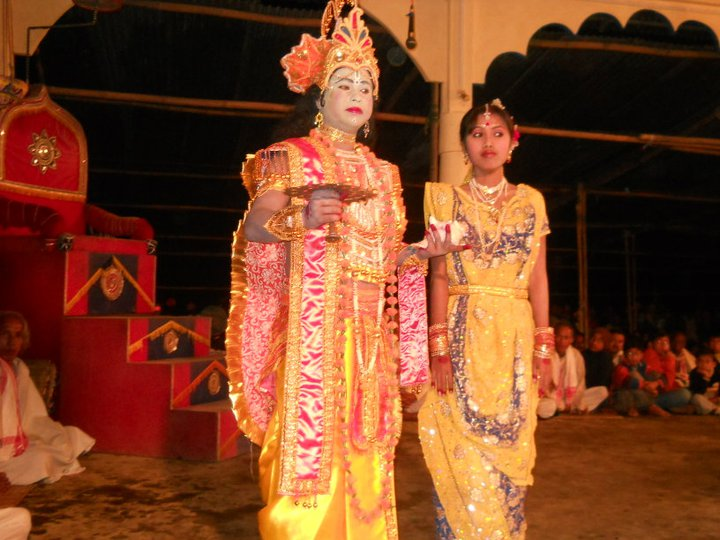
Bhaona performance

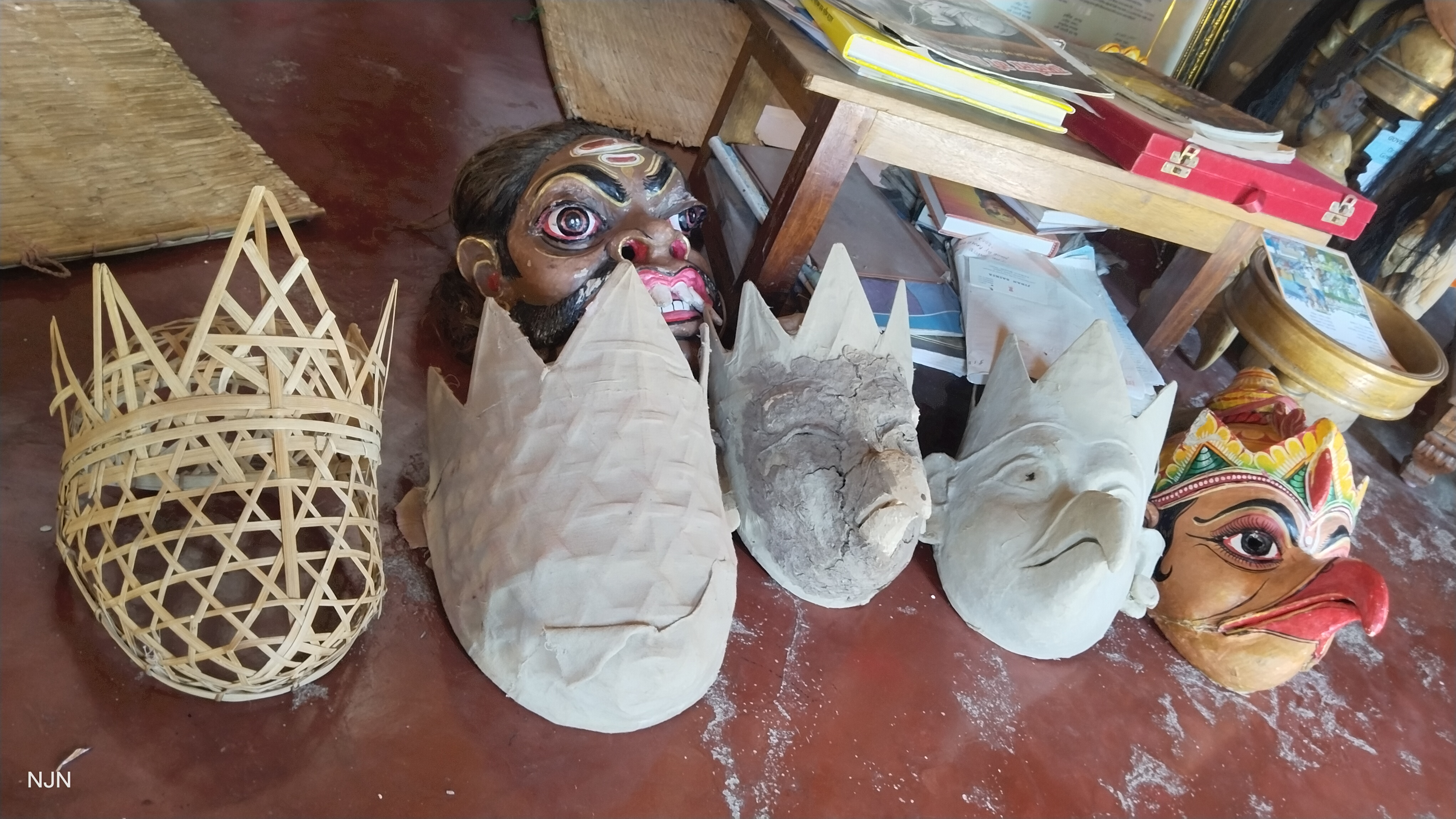
Mask making in Majuli

Performing arts include: Ankia Naat (Onkeeya Naat), a traditional Vaishnav dance-drama (Bhaona) popular since the 15th century CE. It makes use of large masks of gods, goddesses, demons and animals and in between the plays a Sutradhar (Xutrodhar) continues to narrate the story.

Besides Bihu dance and Husori performed during the Bohag Bihu, dance forms of tribal minorities such as; Kushan nritra of Rajbongshi's, Bagurumba and Bordoicikhla dance of Bodos, Mishing Bihu, Banjar Kekan performed during Chomangkan by Karbis, Jhumair of Tea-garden community are some of the major folk dances. Sattriya (Sotriya) dance related to Vaishnav tradition is a classical form of dance. Moreover, there are several other age-old dance-forms such as Barpeta's Bhortal Nritya, Deodhani Nritya, Ojapali, Beula Dance, Ka Shad Inglong Kardom, Nimso Kerung, etc. The tradition of modern moving theatres is typical of Assam with immense popularity of many Mobile theatre groups such as Kohinoor, Brindabon, etc..

Satriya Dance

The indigenous folk music has influenced the growth of a modern idiom, that finds expression in the music of artists like Jyoti Prasad Agarwala, Bishnuprasad Rabha, Parvati Prasad Baruwa, Bhupen Hazarika, Pratima Barua Pandey, Anima Choudhury, Luit Konwar Rudra Baruah, Jayanta Hazarika, Khagen Mahanta, Dipali Barthakur, among many others. Among the new generation, Zubeen Garg, Angaraag Mahanta and Joi Barua. There is an award given in the honour of Bishnu Prasad Rabha for achievements in the cultural/music world of Assam by the state government.

Contemporary Assamese music also saw the rise of Zubeen Garg, one of the most popular modern singers of the region. His Assamese song "Mayabini Raatir Bukut" has achieved iconic status and is widely regarded as an anthem in Assam.

=== Cuisine ===
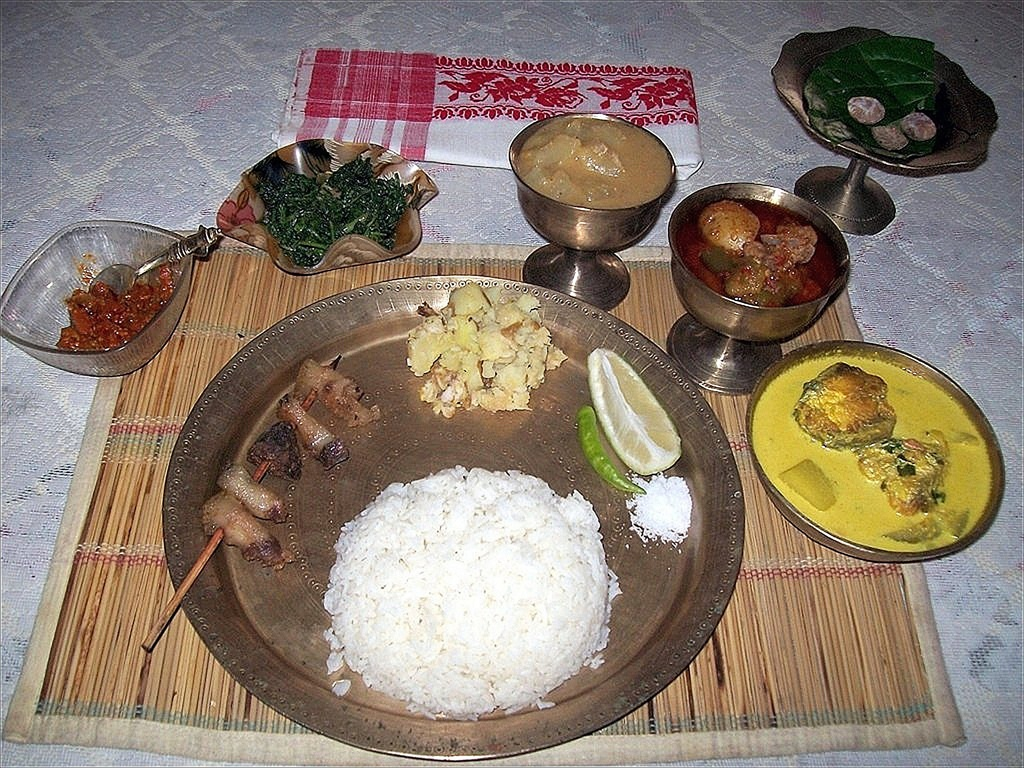
Assamese Thali

Typically, an Assamese meal consists of many things such as bhat (rice) with dayl/ daly (lentils), masor jool (fish stew), mangxô (meat stew) and stir fried greens or herbs and vegetables.

The two main characteristics of a traditional meal in Assam are khar (an Alkali, named after its main ingredient) and tenga (preparations bearing a characteristically rich and tangy flavour). Khorika is the smoked or fire grilled meat eaten with meals. Pitika (mash) is another delicacy of Assam. It includes mashed potatoes, tomatoes, brinjals or even masor fish. Commonly consumed varieties of meat include Mutton, fowl, duck/goose, fish, pigeon, pork and beef (among Muslim and Christian indigenous Assamese ethnic groups). Grasshoppers, locusts, silkworms, snails, eels, bat wild fowl, squab and other birds, and venison are also eaten, albeit in moderation.

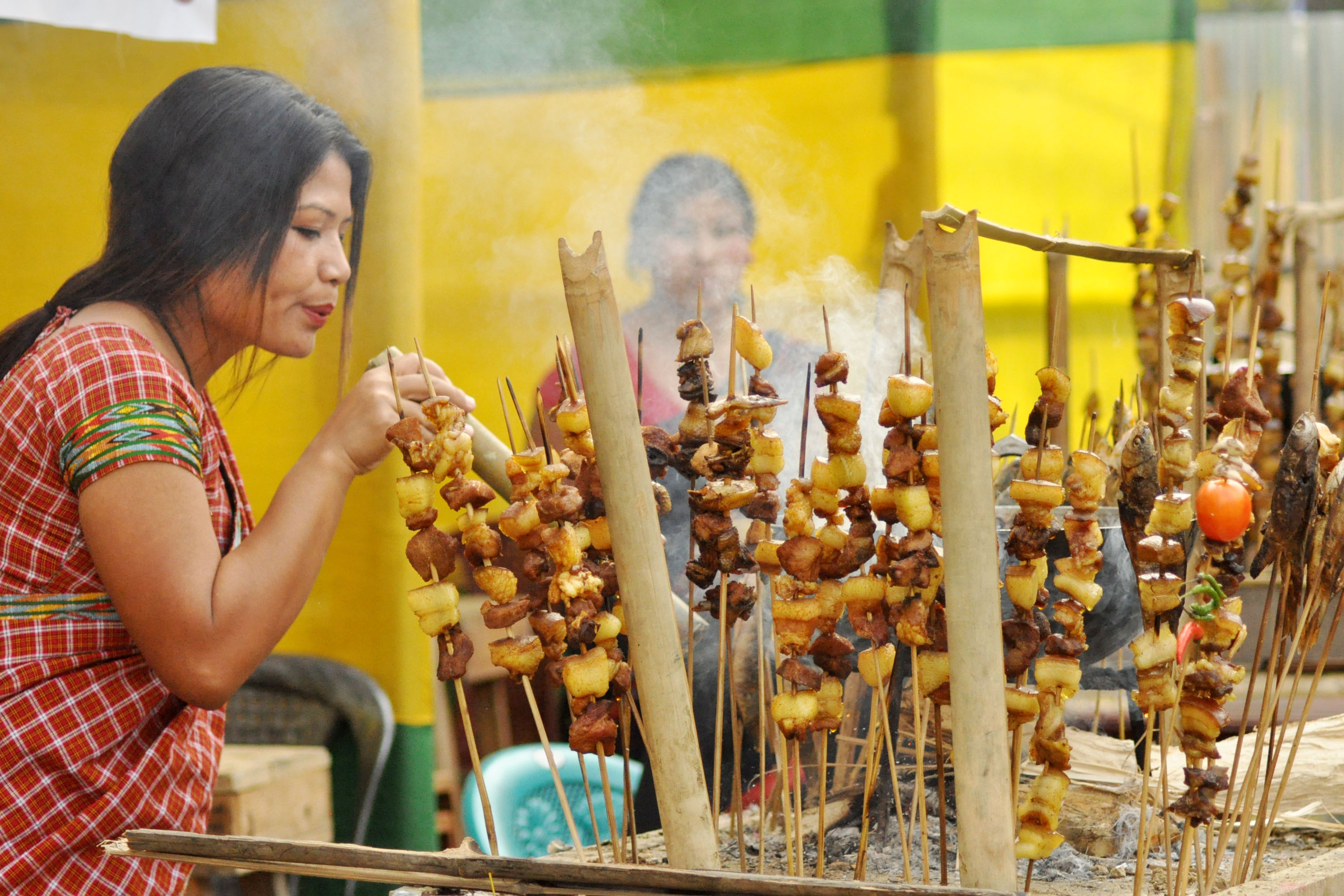
Mising girl roasting fish and pork in bamboo tubes (bahor sungha)

Khorisa (fermented bamboo shoots) are used at times to flavour curries while they can also be preserved and made into pickles. Koldil (banana flower) and squash are also used in popular culinary preparations.

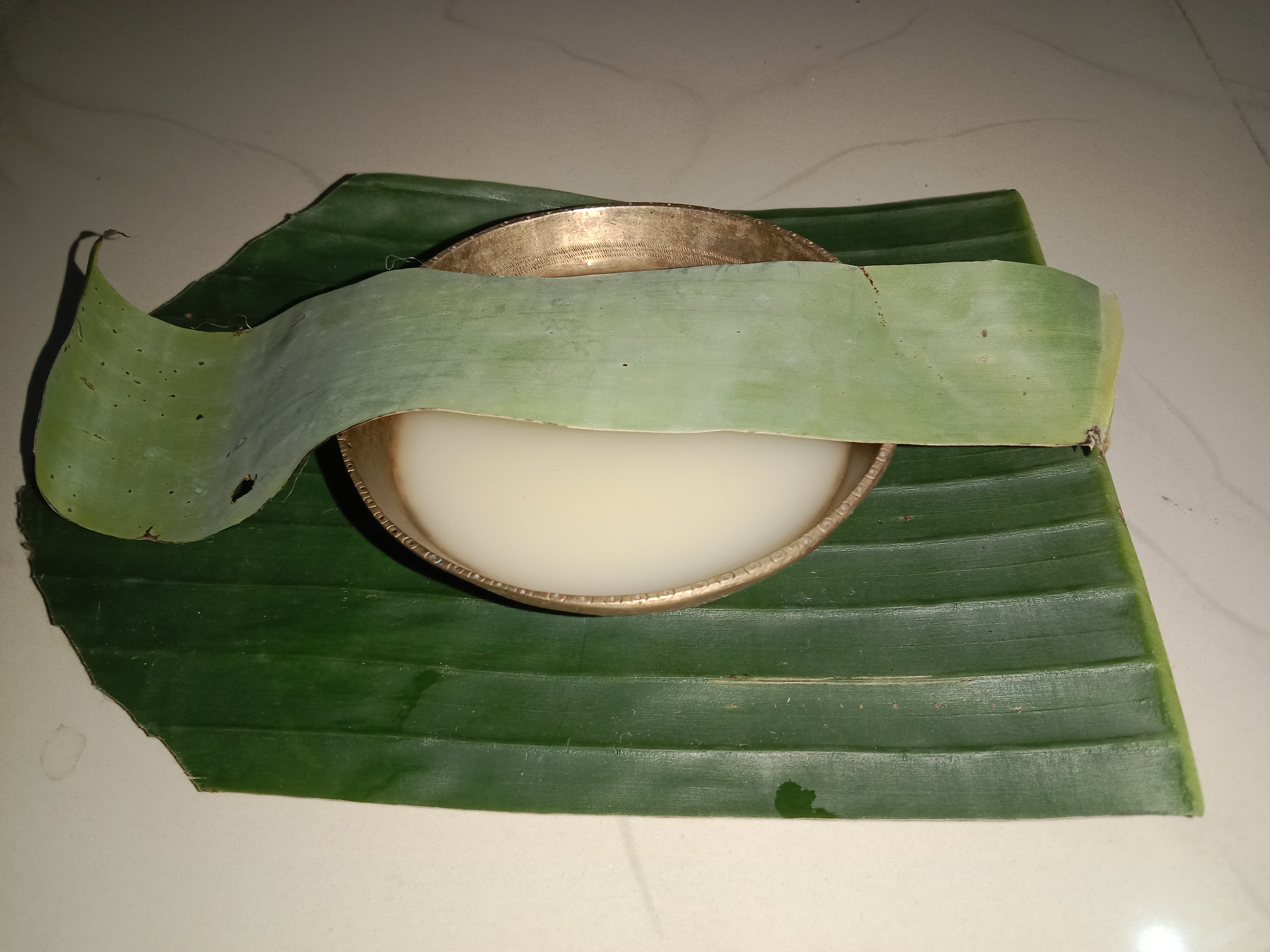
Rice beer is consumed on festivals by the various indigenous ethnic communities of Assam

A variety of different rice cultivars are grown and consumed in different ways, viz., roasted, ground, boiled or just soaked.

Fish curries made of free range wild fish as well as Bôralí, rôu, illish, or sitôl are the most popular.

Another favourite combination is luchi (fried flatbread), a curry which can be vegetarian or non-vegetarian.

Many indigenous Assamese communities households still continue to brew their traditional alcoholic beverages; examples include: Laupani, Xaaj, Paniyo, Jou, Joumai, Hor, Apong, Sujen etc. Such beverages are served during traditional festivities. Declining them is considered socially offensive.

Assamese food is generally served in traditional bell metal dishes and platters like Kanhi, Maihang and so on.

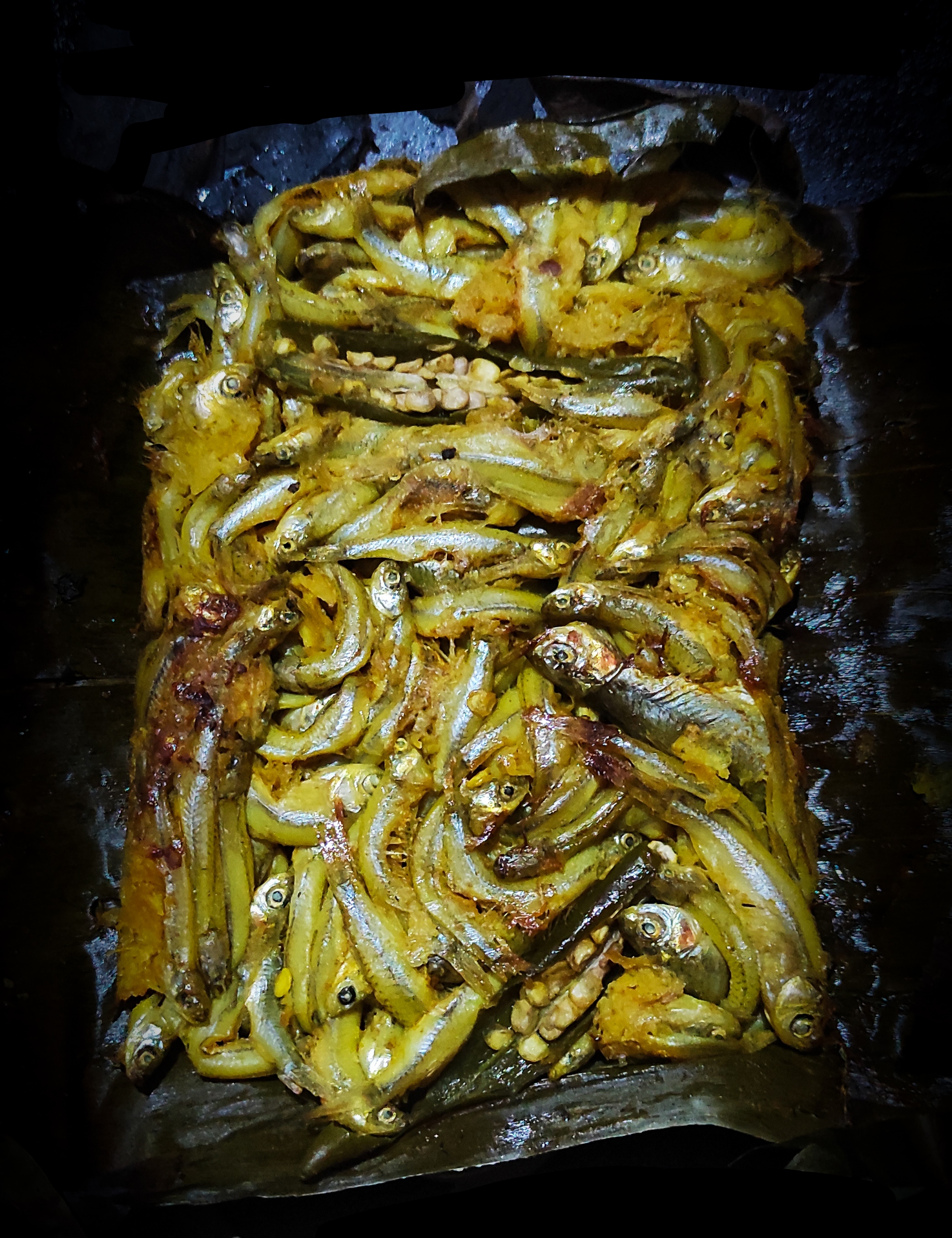
Fish cooked in banana leaves

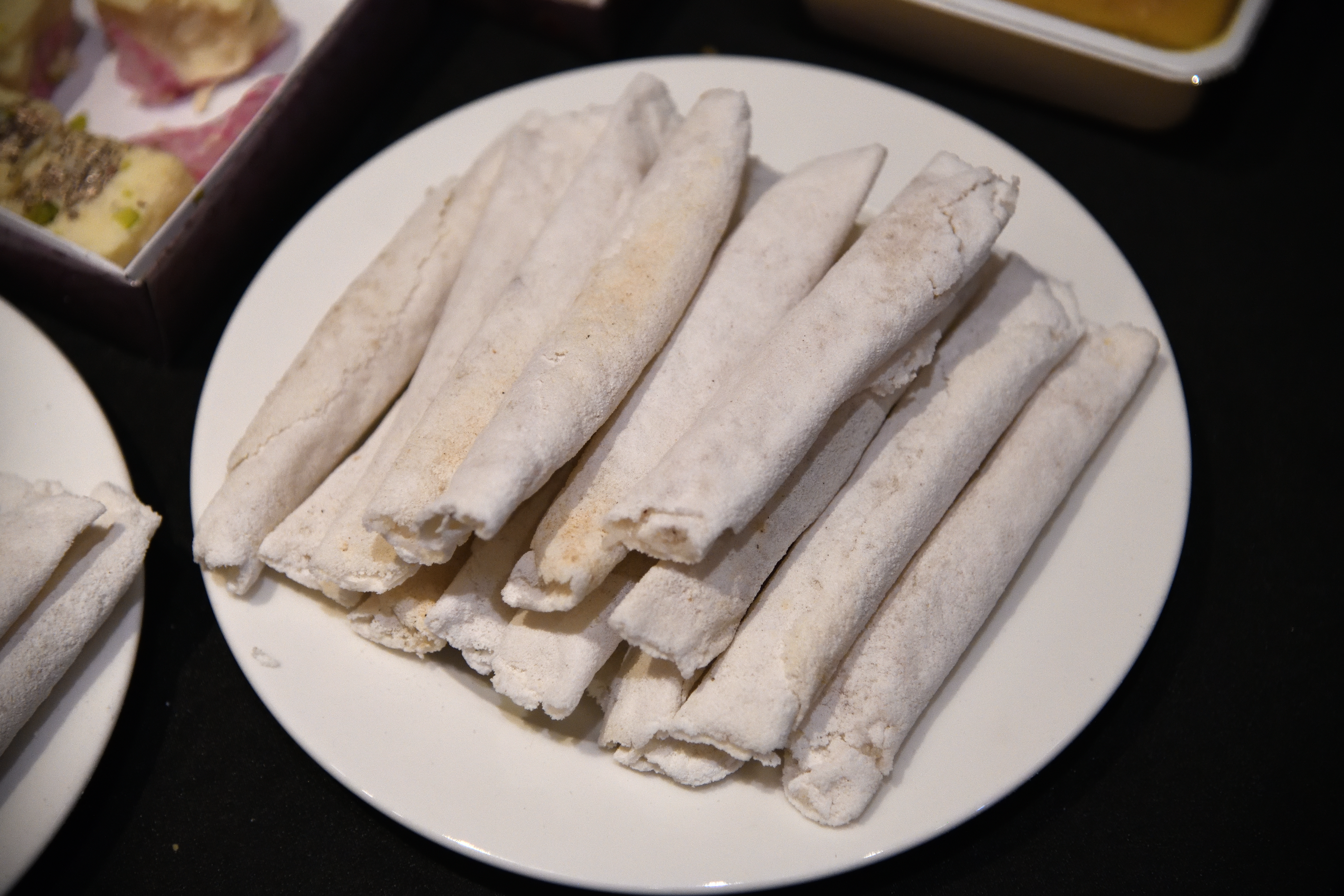
Narikol Pitha is a very popular dish especially during Bihu

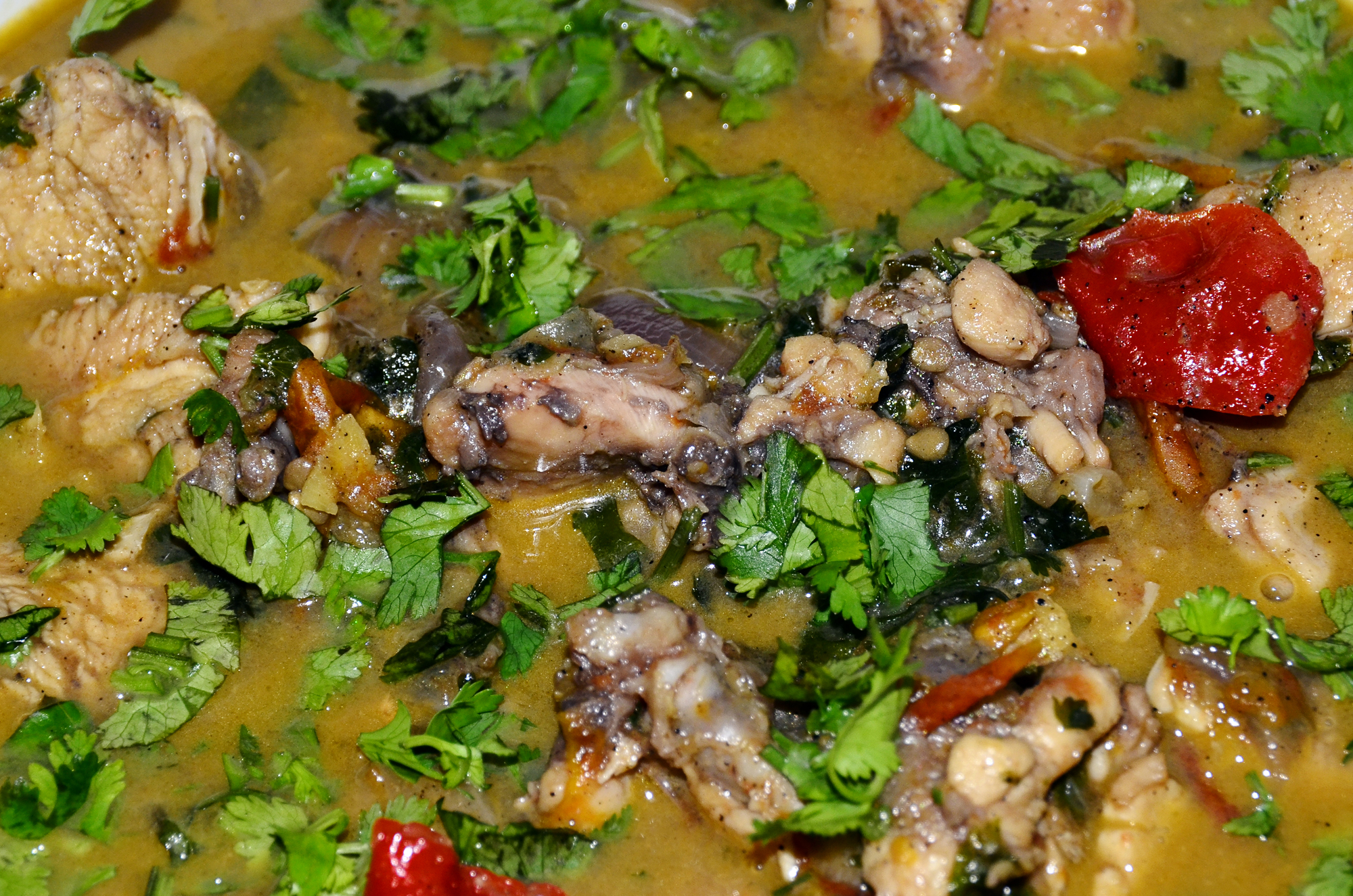

=== Literature ===
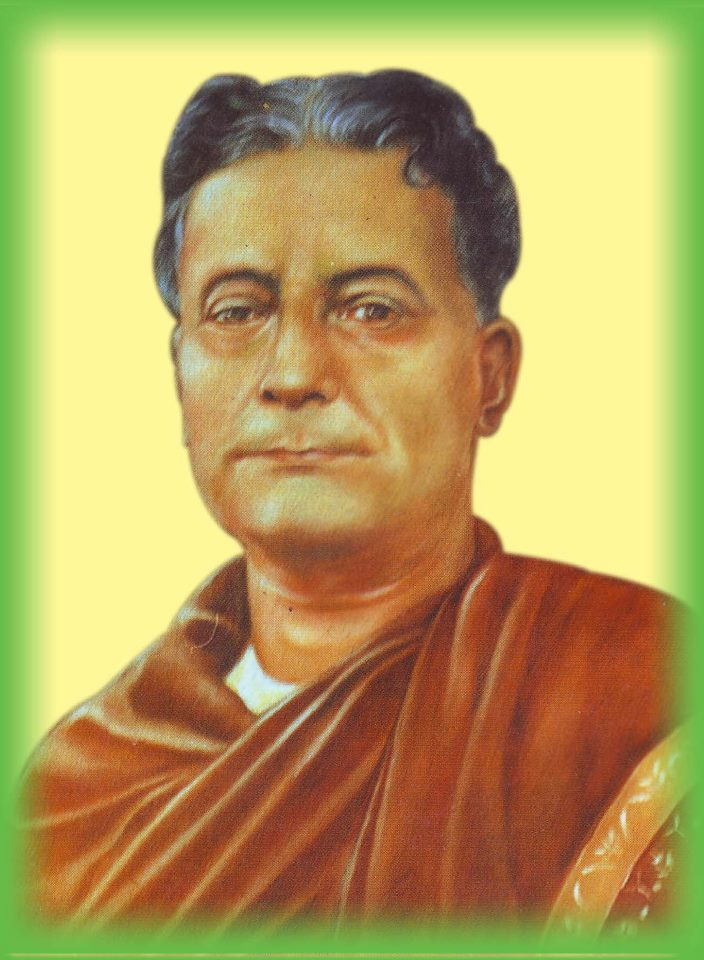
Lakshminath Bezbaroa, one of the foremost figures of Assamese literature

Assamese literature dates back to the composition of Charyapada, and later on works like Saptakanda Ramayana by Madhava Kandali, which is the first translation of the Ramayana into an Indo-Aryan language, contributed to Assamese literature. Sankardeva's Borgeet, Ankia Naat, Bhaona and Satra tradition backed the 15th-16th century Assamese literature. Written during the Reign of Ahoms, the Buranjis are notable literary works which are prominently historical manuscripts. Most literary works are written in Assamese although other local language such as Bodo and Dimasa are also represented. In the 19th and 20th century, Assamese and other literature was modernised by authors including Lakshminath Bezbaroa, Birinchi Kumar Barua, Hem Barua, Dr. Mamoni Raisom Goswami, Bhabendra Nath Saikia, Birendra Kumar Bhattacharya, Hiren Bhattacharyya, Homen Borgohain, Bhabananda Deka, Rebati Mohan Dutta Choudhury, Mahim Bora, Lil Bahadur Chettri, Syed Abdul Malik, Surendranath Medhi, and Hiren Gohain.

=== Fine arts ===
The archaic Mauryan Stupas discovered in and around Goalpara district are the earliest examples (c. 300 BCE to c. 100 CE) of ancient art and architectural works. The remains discovered in Daparvatiya (Doporboteeya) archaeological site with a beautiful doorframe in Tezpur are identified as the best examples of artwork in ancient Assam with influence of Sarnath School of Art of the late Gupta period.

Painting is an ancient tradition of Assam. Xuanzang (7th century CE) mentions that among the Kamarupa king Bhaskaravarma's gifts to Harshavardhana there were paintings and painted objects, some of which were on Assamese silk. Many of the manuscripts such as Hastividyarnava (A Treatise on Elephants), the Chitra Bhagawata and in the Gita Govinda from the Middle Ages bear excellent examples of traditional paintings.

=== Traditional crafts ===
Assam has a rich tradition of crafts, Cane and bamboo craft, bell metal and brass craft, silk and cotton weaving, toy and mask making, pottery and terracotta work, wood craft, jewellery making, and musical instruments making have remained as major traditions.

Cane and bamboo craft provide the most commonly used utilities in daily life, ranging from household utilities, weaving accessories, fishing accessories, furniture, musical instruments, construction materials, etc. Utilities and symbolic articles such as Sorai and Bota made from bell metal and brass are found in every Assamese household. Hajo and Sarthebari (Sorthebaary) are the most important centres of traditional bell-metal and brass crafts. Apart from Sualkuchi (Xualkuchi), the centre for the traditional silk industry, in almost every parts of the Brahmaputra Valley, rural households produce silk and silk garments with embroidery designs. Moreover, various ethno-cultural groups in Assam make different types of cotton garments featuring distinct embroidery designs and colour combinations.

Assam possesses crafts of toy and mask making mostly concentrated in the Vaishnav Monasteries, pottery and terracotta work in western Assam districts and wood craft, iron craft, and jewellery in many places across the region.

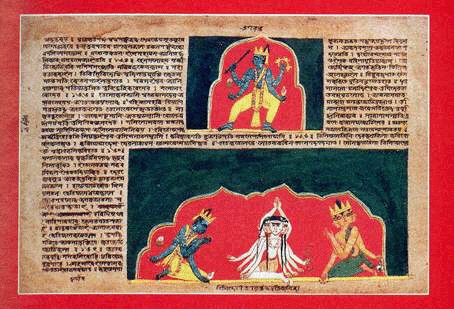
Sanchipat with Assamese illuminations

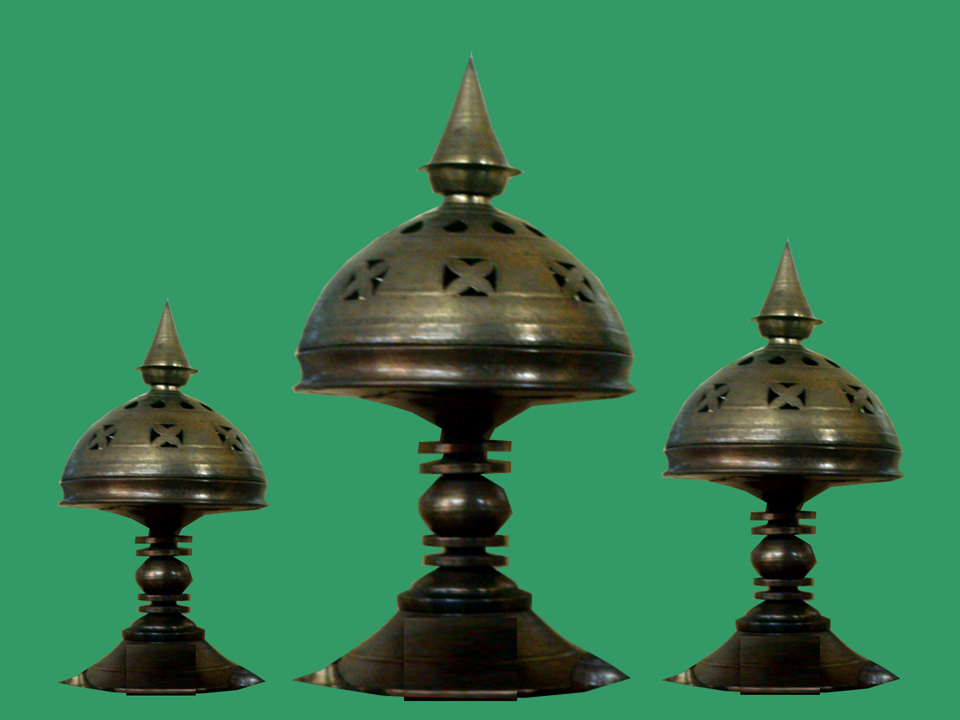
Bell metal made sorai and sophura are important parts of culture

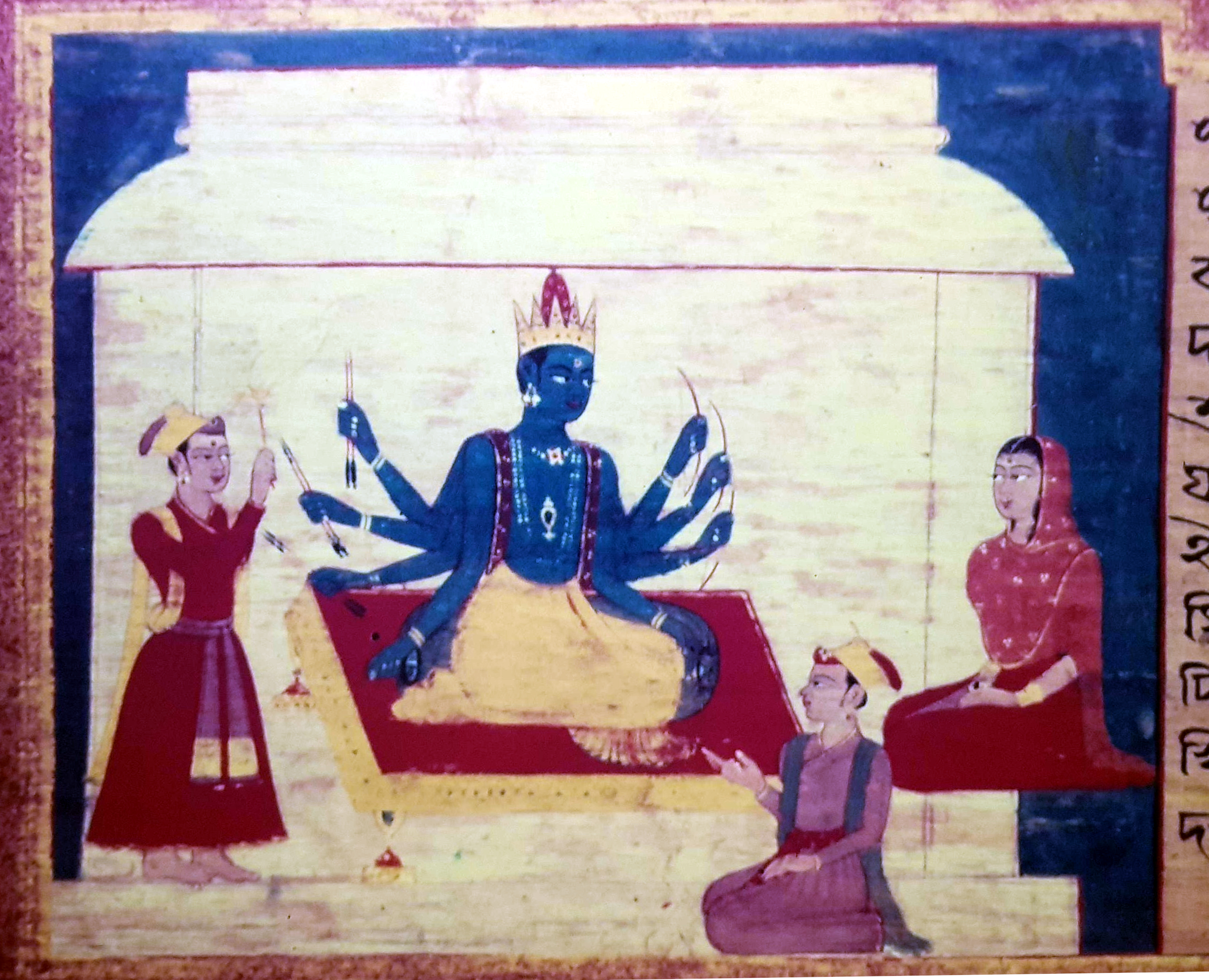
Brihat Ushaharan, an 18th-century manuscript illustration of Garhgoan school of painting

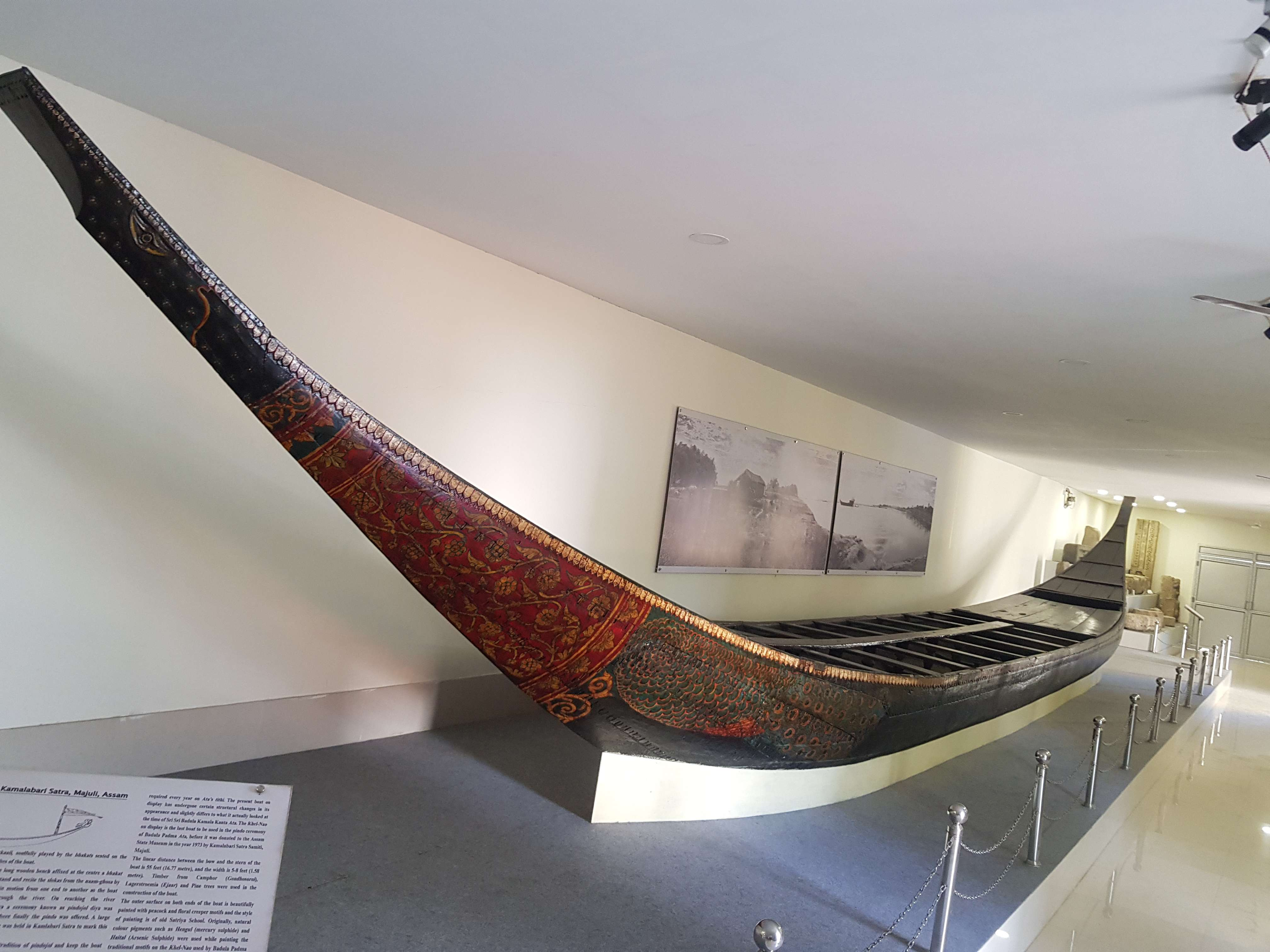
Mayurpokhyi Khel-Nao (Pleasure boat) of medieval Assam, used by Badula Ata of Kamalabari Satra

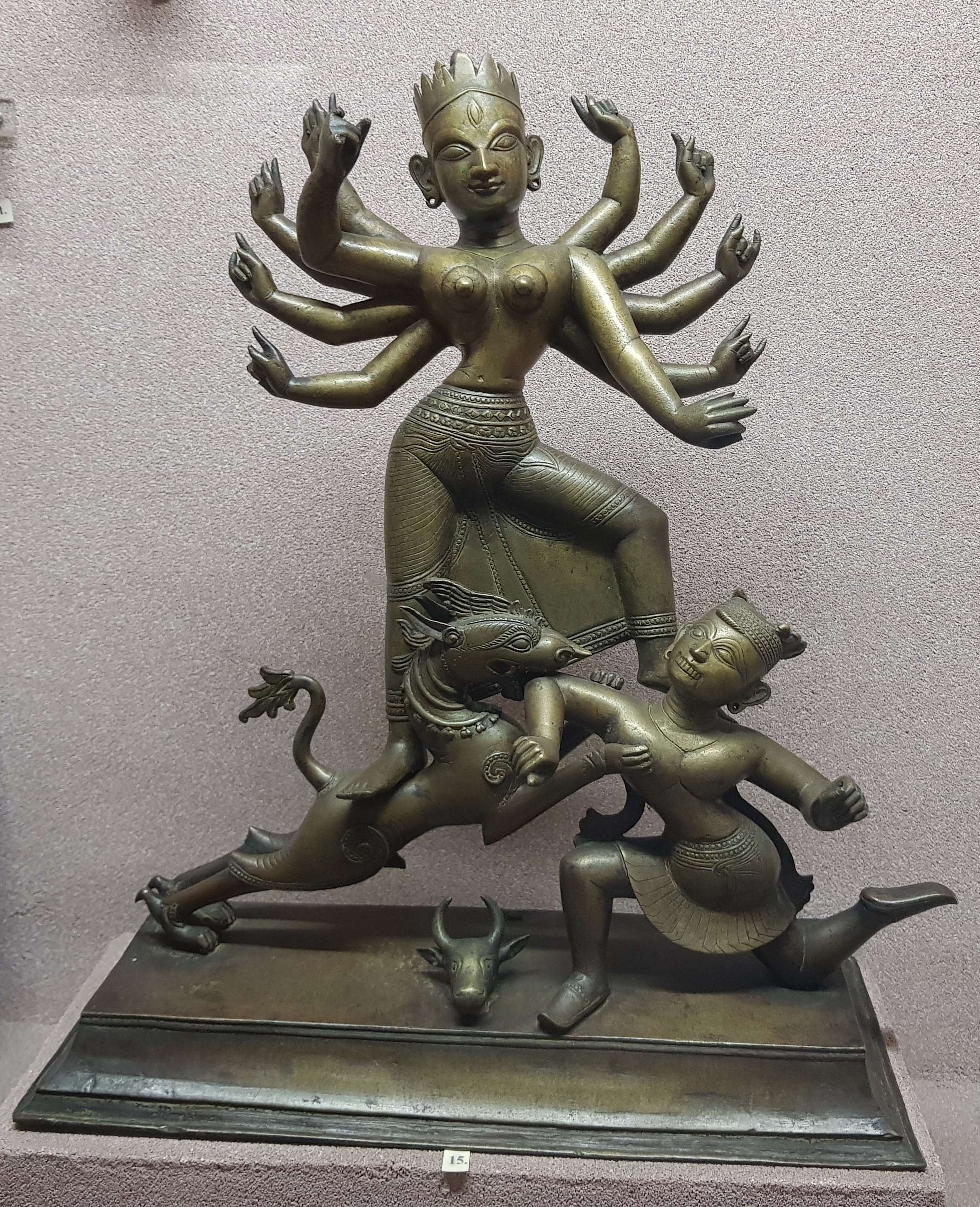
18th century Mahisamardini bronze metal sculpture

== Media ==
Print media include Assamese dailies Amar Asom, Asomiya Khabar, Asomiya Pratidin, Dainik Agradoot, Dainik Janambhumi, Dainik Asam, Gana Adhikar, Janasadharan and Niyomiya Barta. Asom Bani, Sadin and Janambhumi are Assamese weekly newspapers. The English dailies of Assam include The Assam Tribune, The Sentinel, The Telegraph, The Times of India, The North East Times, Eastern Chronicle and The Hills Times. Thekar, in the Karbi language has the largest circulation of any daily from Karbi Anglong district. Bodosa has the highest circulation of any Bodo daily from BTR. Dainik Jugasankha is a Bengali daily with editions from Dibrugarh, Guwahati, Silchar and Kolkata. Dainik Samayik Prasanga, Dainik Prantojyoti, Dainik Janakantha and Nababarta Prasanga are other prominent Bengali dailies published in the Barak Valley towns of Karimganj and Silchar. Hindi dailies include Purvanchal Prahari, Pratah Khabar and Dainik Purvoday.

Broadcasting stations of All India Radio have been established in 22 cities across the state. Local news and music are the main priority for those stations. Assam has three public service broadcasting service stations of state-owned Doordarshan at Dibrugarh, Guwahati and Silchar. The Guwahati-based satellite news channels include Assam Talks, DY 365, News Live, News18 Assam North East, North East Live, Prag News and Pratidin Time.

== Geographical indications ==
=== Boka Chaul ===
Boka Chaul was awarded the Geographical Indication (GI) status tag from the Geographical Indications Registry, under the Union Government of India, on 30 July 2018 and is valid until 24 July 2026.

Lotus Progressive Centre (LPC) and Centre for Environment Education (CEE) from Guwahati, proposed the GI registration of Boka Chaul. After filing the application in July 2018, the rice was granted the GI tag in 2023 by the Geographical Indication Registry in Chennai, making the name "Boka Chaul" exclusive to the rice grown in the region. It thus became the second rice variety from Assam after Joha rice and the 7th type of goods from Assam to earn the GI tag.

The GI tag protects the rice from illegal selling and marketing, and gives it legal protection and a unique identity.

== See also ==
- Outline of Assam – comprehensive topic guide listing articles about Assam
- List of people from Assam

== Sources ==
- Ahmed, Abu Nasar Saied; Baruah, Joydeep; Bhuyan, Ratna (2006). Election Politics in Assam: Issues, Trends, and People's Mandate. Akansha Publishing House. ISBN 978-8183700573.
- Baruah, S L (1986), A Comprehensive History of Assam, Munshiram Manoharlal
- Gogoi, Khagen (2017). Ahom warfare evolution nature and strategy (PhD). Gauhati University. hdl:10603/224778.
- Lahiri, Nayanjot (1984). "The Pre-Ahom Roots of Medieval Assam". Social Scientist. 12 (6): 60–69. doi:10.2307/3517004. ISSN 0970-0293. JSTOR 3517004. Archived from the original on 9 July 2021.
- Saikia, Yasmin (2004). Fragmented Memories: Struggling to be Tai-Ahom in India. Duke University Press. ISBN 082238616X. Archived from the original on 1 February 2023.
- Shin, Jae-Eun (2018), "Region Formed and Imagined: Reconsidering temporal, spatial and social context of Kamarupa", in Dzüvichü, Lipokmar; Baruah, Manjeet (eds.), Modern Practices in North East India: History, Culture, Representation, London & New York: Routledge
- Directorate of Information and Public Relations, Government of Assam, Assam at a Glance, archived from the original on 6 October 2007
- Goswami, G. C.; Tamuli, Jyotiprakash (2003). "Asamiya". In Cardona, George; Jain, Dhanesh (eds.). The Indo-Aryan Languages. Routledge. pp. 391–443.
- National Commission for Women (2004), Situational Analysis of Women in Assam (PDF), archived from the original (PDF) on 15 June 2007.
- Masica, Colin P. (1993), Indo-Aryan Languages, Cambridge University Press, ISBN 9780521299442, archived from the original on 1 February 2023
- National Mission on Bamboo Applications, Assam, State Profile, archived from the original on 29 September 2007
- Revenue Department, Government of Assam, Revenue Administration – Districts and Subdivisions, archived from the original on 24 July 2007
- Singh, K. S (ed) (2003) People of India: Assam Vol XV Parts I and II, Anthropological Survey of India, Seagull Books, Calcutta
- Das, Paromita (2005). "The Naraka Legends, Aryanisation and the "varnasramadharma" in the Brahmaputra Valley". Proceedings of the Indian History Congress. 66. Indian History Congress: 224–230. JSTOR 44145840.
- UNDP (2004), Chapter 2, Income, Employment and Poverty in Assam Human Development Report, 2003, Government of Assam, archived from the original on 20 February 2007
- Wandrey, C. J. (2004), "Sylhet-Kopili/Barail-Tipam Composite Total Petroleum System, Assam Geologic Province, India" (PDF), US Geological Survey Bulletin, 2208-D: 5, Bibcode:2004usgs.rept....5W, doi:10.3133/b2208D, archived (PDF) from the original on 5 June 2007
- Casson, Lionel (1989). The Periplus Maris Erythraei: Text With Introduction, Translation, and Commentary. Princeton University Press. ISBN 978-0-691-04060-8. Archived from the original on 1 February 2023.
- Khan, Sameer Ud Dowla (21 February 2018). "Amago Bhasha: In celebration of our ethnic and linguistic diversity". Dhaka Tribune.
