= Outline of Assam =

State of India

Location of Assam in India

An enlargeable map of Assam

The following outline is provided as an overview of and topical guide to Assam:

Assam – 16th largest, 15th most populous and 26th most literate state of the 28 states of the democratic Republic of India. Assam is at 14th position in life expectancy and 8th in female-to-male sex ratio. Assam is the 21st most media exposed states in India. The Economy of Assam is largely agriculture based with 69% of the population engaged in it. Growth rate of Assam's income has not kept pace with that of India's during the Post-British Era; differences increased rapidly since the 1970s. While the Indian economy grew at 6 percent per annum over the period of 1981 to 2000, the same of Assam's grew only by 3.3 percent.

== General reference ==
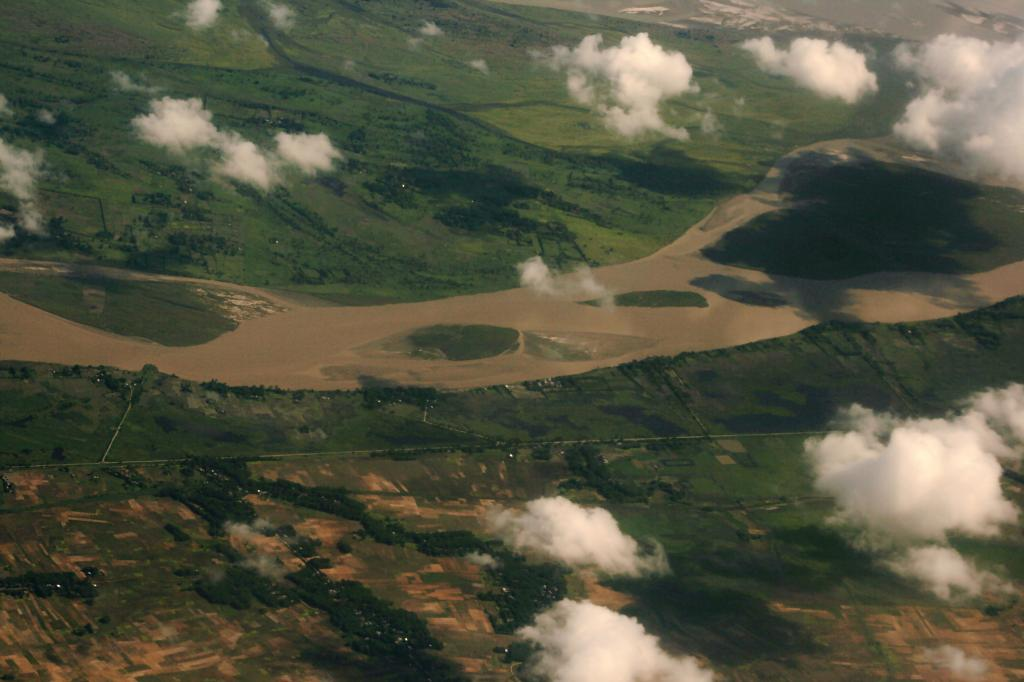
Aerial view of the Brahmaputra River

=== Names ===
- Official name: Assam
- Common name: Assam
  - Assamese: [ɔxɔm]
  - English: /əˈsæm/
    - Audio pronunciation
- Etymology of Assam
- Adjectival(s): Assamese
- Demonym(s): Assamese, Asamiya
- Abbreviations and name codes
  - ISO 3166-2 code: IN-AS
  - Vehicle registration code: AS

=== Rankings (amongst India's states) ===
- by population: 15th
- by area (2011 census): 17th
- by crime rate (Census 2021): 17th
- by gross domestic product (GDP) (2014): 18th
- by Human Development Index (HDI):
- by life expectancy at birth:
- by literacy rate:

== Geography of Assam ==
Physical geography of Assam

- Assam is: an Indian state, one of the Seven Sister States

=== Location of Assam ===
- Assam is situated within the following regions:
  - Northern Hemisphere
  - Eastern Hemisphere
    - Eurasia
      - Asia
        - South Asia
          - India
            - Northeast India
- Time zone: Indian Standard Time (UTC+05:30)

=== Environment of Assam ===
- Biodiversity of Assam
- Ecological issues in Assam
  - Rhino poaching in Assam

==== Natural geographic features of Assam ====
- Rivers of Assam
  - Brahmaputra River
  - Barak River
  - Mora Dhansiri River
  - Dhansiri River
  - Dihing River
  - River Diphlu
- Valleys in Assam
  - Brahmaputra Valley
  - Barak Valley
- River Island
  - Majuli
  - Umananda
  - Dibru-Saikhowa

==== Protected areas of Assam ====
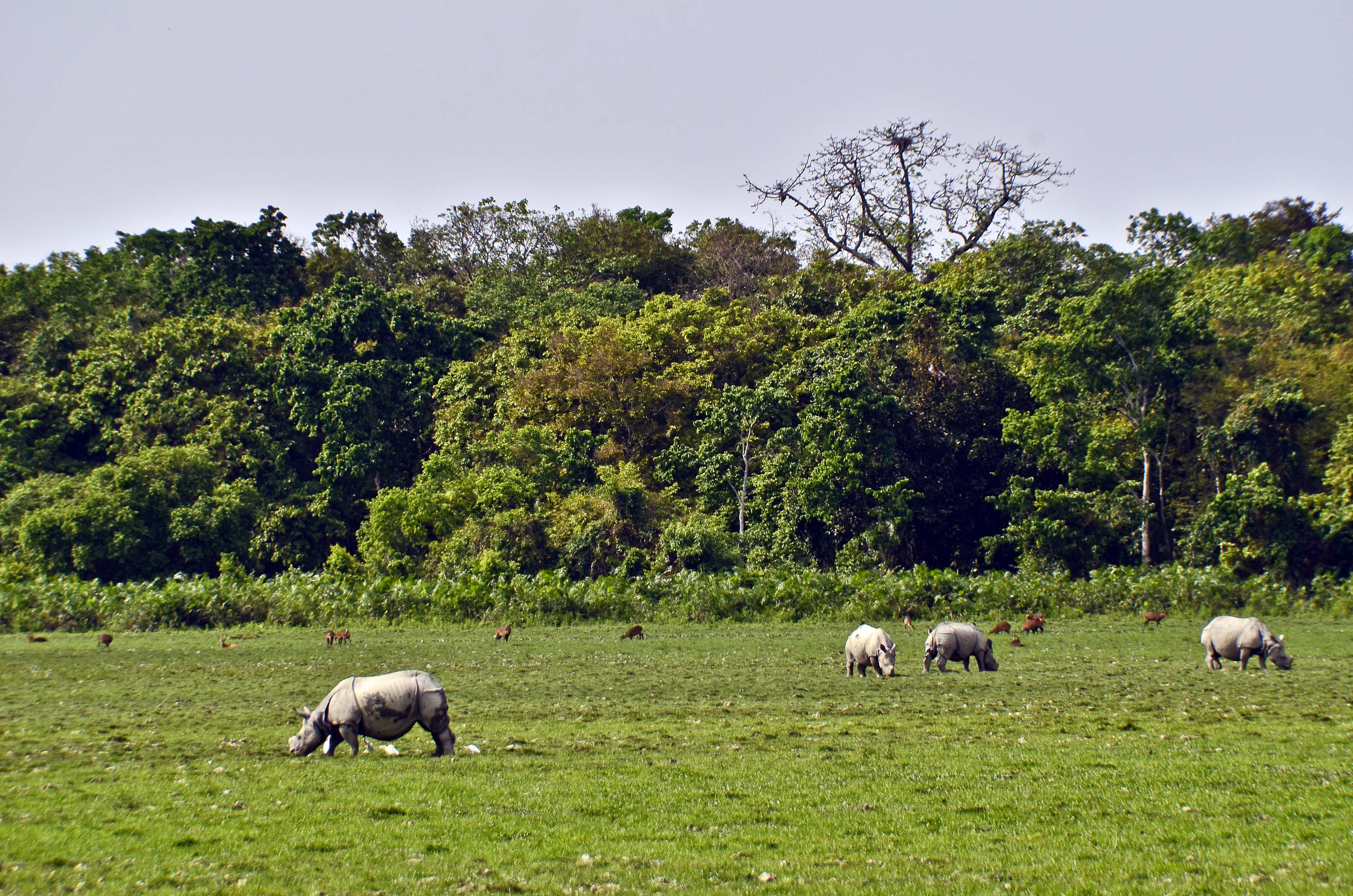
One horned Indian rhinos gazing at swamp area near Bagori range under Kaziranga National Park in Nagaon district of Assam, India.

Protected areas of Assam – Assam has five national parks (2.51% of State's geographical area) and 18 wildlife sanctuaries (1.88% of State's geographical area, including proposed) wildlife sanctuaries.

===== National Parks in Assam =====
- Kaziranga National Park
- Manas National Park
- Nameri National Park
- Dibru-Saikhowa National Park
- Orang National Park
- Dihing Patkai National Park
- Raimona National Park
- Sikhna Jwhwlao National Park

===== Wildlife sanctuaries in Assam =====
- Hoollongapar Gibbon Sanctuary
- Garampani Wildlife Sanctuary
- Bura Chapori Wildlife Sanctuary
- Bornadi Wildlife Sanctuary
- Sonai Rupai Wildlife Sanctuary
- Pobitora Wildlife Sanctuary
- Panidihing Bird Sanctuary
- Bherjan-Borajan-Padumoni Wildlife Sanctuary
- Nambor Wildlife Sanctuary
- North Karbi-Anglong Wildlife Sanctuary
- East Karbi-Anglong Wildlife Sanctuary
- Laokhowa Wildlife Sanctuary
- Chakrashila Wildlife Sanctuary
- Marat Longri Wildlife Sanctuary
- Nambor-Doigrung Wildlife Sanctuary
- Dehing Patkai Wildlife Sanctuary
- Borail Wildlife Sanctuary
- Amsang Wildlife Sanctuary

==== Administrative divisions of Assam ====
===== Divisions of Assam =====
- North Assam
- Lower Assam
- Upper Assam
- Hills and Barak Valley

===== List of districts along with the district headquarters =====
Districts of Assam

Districts of Assam – Assam had 27 districts till 15 August 2015 after which the Chief Minister of Assam Tarun Gogoi announced 5 more new districts taking the total no of districts to 35. On 8 September 2016, Assam got 33rd district as Majuli (1st river island district of India) On 23 January 2022 2 new district were added Tamulpur and Bajali district.

- Barpeta district - Barpeta
- Bongaigaon district - Bongaigaon
- Bajali district - Bajali
- Cachar district - Silchar
- Darrang district - Mangaldai
- Dhemaji district - Dhemaji
- Dhubri district - Dhubri
- Dibrugarh district - Dibrugarh
- Goalpara district - Goalpara
- Golaghat district - Golaghat
- Hailakandi district - Hailakandi
- Jorhat district - Jorhat
- Karbi Anglong district
- Karimganj district - Karimganj
- Kokrajhar district - Kokrajhar
- Lakhimpur district - North Lakhimpur
- Majuli district - Garamur
- Morigaon district - Morigaon
- Nagaon district - Nagaon
- Nalbari district - Nalbari
- Dima Hasao district - Haflong
- Sivasagar district - Sivasagar
- Sonitpur district - Tezpur
- Tinsukia district - Tinsukia
- Tamulpur district - Tamulpur
- Kamrup district - Amingaon
- Kamrup Metropolitan district - Guwahati
- Baksa district -Mushalpur
- Udalguri district -Udalguri
- Chirang district -Kajalgaon
- West Karbi Anglong district
- Bishwanath district - Bishwanath Chariali
- Hojai - Hojai
- Charaideo -Sonari
- South Salmara-Mankachar

Assam have 78 sub-divisions under 35 districts.

===== Municipalities in Assam =====
- Cities and towns in Assam
  - Capital of Assam: Dispur
  - Barpeta
  - Bongaigaon
  - Dhubri
  - Dibrugarh
  - Diphu
  - Goalpara
  - Golaghat
  - Guwahati
  - Jorhat
  - Karimganj
  - Kokrajhar.
  - Nagaon
  - North Lakhimpur
  - Sivasagar
  - Silchar
  - Tezpur
  - Tinsukia
- Cities in Assam by population

=== Demographics of Assam ===
People of Assam

==== Population demographics ====
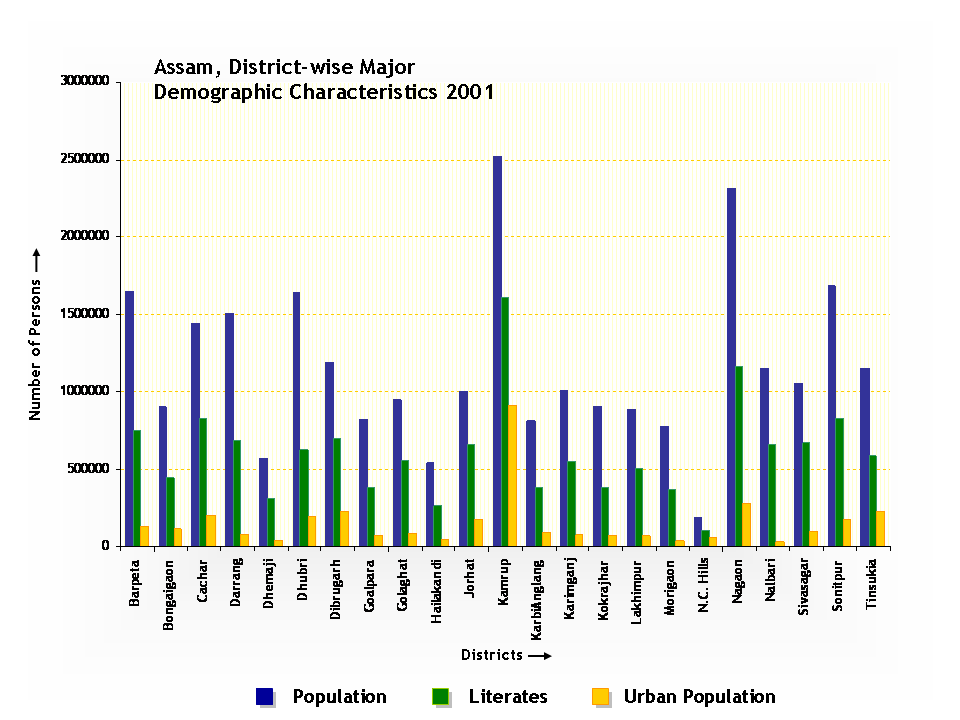
District-wise Demographic Characteristics in 2001

Population Growth
Year	Pop.	±%
1951	8,029,000	—
1961	10,837,000	+35.0%
1971	14,625,000	+35.0%
1981	18,041,000	+23.4%
1991	22,414,000	+24.2%
2001	26,656,000	+18.9%
2011	31,169,272	+16.9%
Source:Census of India; The 1981 Census could not be held in Assam. Total population for 1981 has been worked out by interpolation.

Total population of Assam was 26.66 million with 4.91 million households in 2001.

==== Religion demographics of Assam ====
Religion in Assam (2011)
1. Hinduism (61.5%)
2. Islam (34.2%)
3. Christianity (3.73%)
4. Buddhism (0.17%)
5. Jainism (0.08%)
6. Sikhism (0.06%)
7. Other or not religious (0.30%)

Religion demographics of Assam – according to the 2011 census, 61.5% were Hindus, 34.22% were Muslims. Christian minorities (3.7%) are found among Scheduled Tribe population. Other religions followed include Jainism (0.1%), Buddhism (0.2%), Sikhism (0.1%) and Animism (amongst Khamti, Phake, Aiton etc. communities).

==== Language demographics ====
Languages of Assam in 2001
1. Assamese (48.8%)
2. Bengali (27.5%)
3. Bodo (4.80%)
4. Hindi (5.88%)
5. Nepali (2.12%)
6. Mishing (1.90%)
7. Karbi (1.50%)
8. Other (8.50%)

== Government and politics of Assam ==
Politics of Assam

- Form of government: Indian state government (parliamentary system of representative democracy)
- Capital of Assam: Dispur
- Elections in Assam

=== Union government in Assam ===
- Rajya Sabha members from Assam
- Assam Pradesh Congress Committee

=== Branches of the government of Assam ===
Government of Assam

==== Executive branch of the government of Assam ====
- Head of government: Governor of Assam (nominal)
  - Governors of Assam
    - Raj Bhavan – official residence of the governor of Assam.
- Head of state: Chief Minister of Assam
  - Chief Ministers of Assam
- Departments and agencies of Assam
    - Assam Institute of Management
    - Assam State Electricity Board
    - Assam State Film (Finance and Development) Corporation Ltd.
    - Assam State Transport Corporation
    - Department of Environment and Forests, Government of Assam
    - Guwahati Metropolitan Development Authority
    - Secondary Education Board of Assam

==== Legislative branch of the government of Assam ====
- Assam Legislative Assembly (unicameral)
  - Constituencies of Assam Legislative Assembly

==== Judicial branch of the government of Assam ====
- Gauhati High Court

=== Law in Assam ===
- Human rights abuses in Assam
- Law enforcement in Assam
  - Law enforcement agencies in Assam
    - Assam Police
- Taxation
  - Assam General Sales Tax

=== Military in Assam ===
Military of India – the states of India do not have their own militaries. The government of India oversees the defense of the country and its states.

- Assam Rifles
- Assam Regiment

== History of Assam ==
History of Assam

- Assam Mail
- Timeline of Assam History

=== History of Assam, by period ===
==== Prehistoric Assam ====
- Pragjyotisha Kingdom
- Danava dynasty
- Naraka dynasty

==== Ancient Assam ====
- Davaka
- Kamarupa

==== Medieval Assam ====
- Ahom kingdom
- Chutiya Kingdom
- Kachari Kingdom
- Kamata Kingdom
- Baro-Bhuyan

==== Colonial Assam ====
- British annexation of Assam
- Burmese invasions of Assam (1817 - 1826)
- Colonial Assam (1826 - 1947)
  - Assam Province (1912 - 1947)
  - Assam Bengal Railway

==== Contemporary Assam ====
- Legislature of Assam (Since 1937)
- Undivided Assam (1947 - 1963)
- Assam separatist movements
- Assam Movement
- Assam Accord
- 2009 Assam bombings
- 2012 Assam violence
- May 2014 Assam violence
- December 2014 Assam violence
- 2016 Assam floods

=== History of Assam, by region ===
==== History of Assam, by district ====
- History of Barpeta district
- History of Bongaigaon district
- History of Cachar district
- History of Darrang district
- History of Dhemaji district
- History of Dhubri district
- History of Dibrugarh district
- History of Goalpara district
- History of Golaghat district
- History of Hailakandi district
- History of Jorhat district
- History of Karbi Anglong district
- History of Karimganj district
- History of Kokrajhar district
- History of Lakhimpur district
- History of Morigaon district
- History of Nagaon district
- History of Nalbari district
- History of Dima Hasao district
- History of Sivasagar district
- History of Sonitpur district
- History of Tinsukia district
- History of Kamrup district
- History of Kamrup Metropolitan district
- History of Baksa district
- History of Udalguri district
- History of Chirang district
- History of West Karbi Anglong district
- Bishwanath - History of Bishwanath Chariali
- History of Hojai
- History of Charaideo
- History of South Salmara-Mankachar district

==== History of Assam, by city or town ====
- History of Bongaigaon
- History of Dhubri
- History of Dibrugarh
- History of Golaghat
- History of Guwahati
- History of Jorhat
  - Timeline of Jorhat
- History of Karimganj
- History of Sivasagar
- History of Silchar
- History of Tezpur
- History of Tinsukia

=== History of Assam, by subject ===
- Assam Bengal Railway
- Assam separatist movements

== Culture of Assam ==
Culture of Assam

- Cuisine of Assam
  - Assam Tea
- Gamosa
- Languages of Assam
  - Assamese script
  - Assamese Jolpan
- Monuments in Assam
  - Monuments of National Importance in Assam
  - State Protected Monuments in Assam
- Textiles and dresses of Assam
  - Muga silk
  - Eri silk

=== Art in Assam ===
7th–8th century specimen of Assamese (Kamrupi) literature

- Cinema of Assam
  - Joymati, first Assamese motion picture
  - Assam State Film (Finance and Development) Corporation Ltd.
- Fine Arts of Assam
- Music of Assam
- Traditional crafts of Assam

==== Dance of Assam ====
- Folk dances of Assam
  - Bagurumba
  - Bihu Dance
  - Jhumur
- Ekasarana Dharma
- Borgeet
- Sattra
- Sattriya Dance

==== Literature of Assam ====
Assamese literature

- Assamese poetry
  - Assamese Poets
- Assamese writers' Pen Names
- Assamese Periodicals
- The Arunodoi (Orunodoi - 1846)
- The Hemkosh
- The Assam Tribune
- Assam Rhetorical Congress
- Buranji
- Kirtan Ghosa
- Dasham
- Namghosa
- Kotha Ramayana
- Saptakanda Ramayana

==== Music of Assam ====
Music of Assam

- Goalpariya lokageet
- Tokari geet
- Dihanaam
- Hiranaam
- Dhol
  - Gogona
- Pepa

=== Festivities in Assam ===
==== Festivals in Assam ====
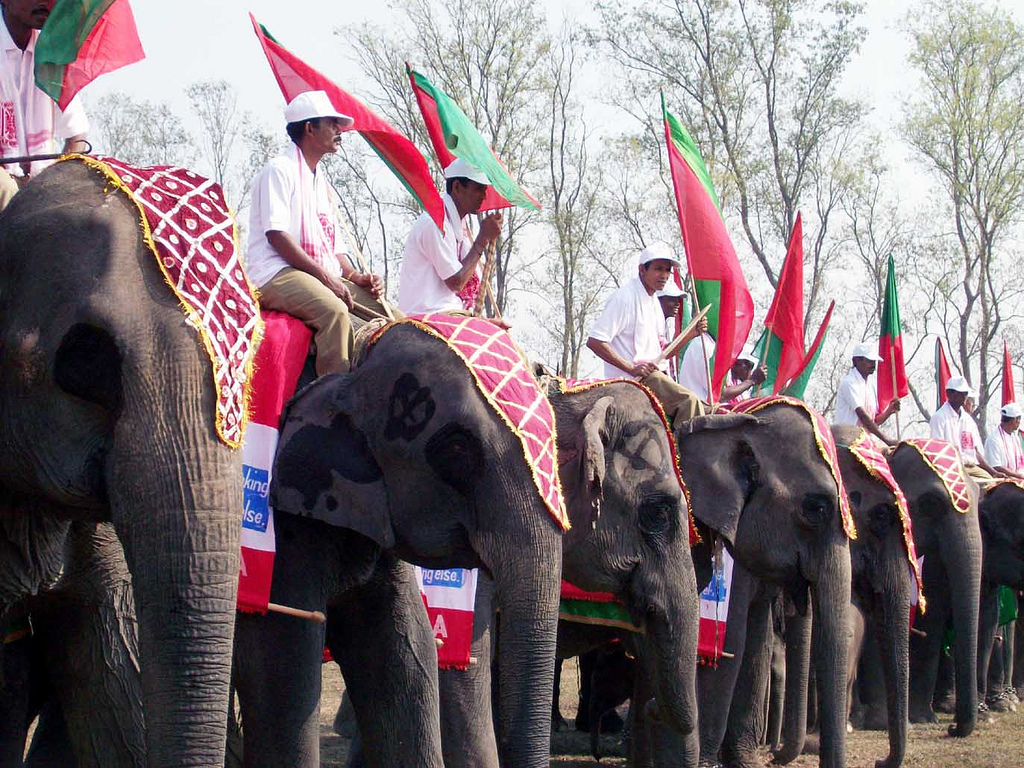
Kaziranga Elephant Festival

- Ali Ai Ligang
- Bathou Puja
- Bihu
- Brahmaputra Beach Festival
- Brahmaputra Festival
- Bwisagu
- Beshoma
- Dehing Patkai Festival
- Garja
- Hacha-kekan
- Hapsa Hatarnai
- Kaziranga Elephant Festival
- Kherai
- Magh Bihu
- Majuli Festival
- Me-Dam-Me-Phi
- Porag
- Rongker
- Sokk-erroi
- Tea Festival

==== Fairs in Assam ====
- Ambubachi Mela
- Chunbîl Melâ (Jonbeel Mela)
- Rongali Utsav

=== Languages in Assam ===
- Assamese language
- Bengali language
- Bodo language
- Nepali language
- Bishnupriya Manipuri language

=== People of Assam ===
People of Assam

- Assamese people
  - Ahom people
  - Assamese Brahmins
  - Kalitas
  - Koch Rajbongshi
  - Chutiya people
  - Na Asamiya
- Tribes of Assam
  - Tea-tribes of Assam
  - Bodo
  - Mising
  - Karbi
  - Tiwa (Lalung)
  - Deori people
  - Bodo-Kachari people
  - Naga people
  - Dimasa people
- List of people from Assam

==== Notable surnames in Assam ====
- Barua (and its variations)
- Borah
- Bharali
- Borbarua
- Borgohain
- Borpatrogohain
- Borphukan
- Burhagohain
- Chakraborty
- Choudhury (and its variations)
- Das
- Deka
- Dutta
- Gayen
- Gogoi
- Gohain
- Goswami
- Hazarika
- Kalita
- Saikia
- Sarma
- Chutia
- Sutradhar
- Kurmi

=== Religion in Assam ===
Religion in Assam

- Christianity in Assam
  - Anglican Diocese of Assam
  - Assam Baptist Convention
- Islam in Assam
- Jainism in Assam

==== Hinduism in Assam ====
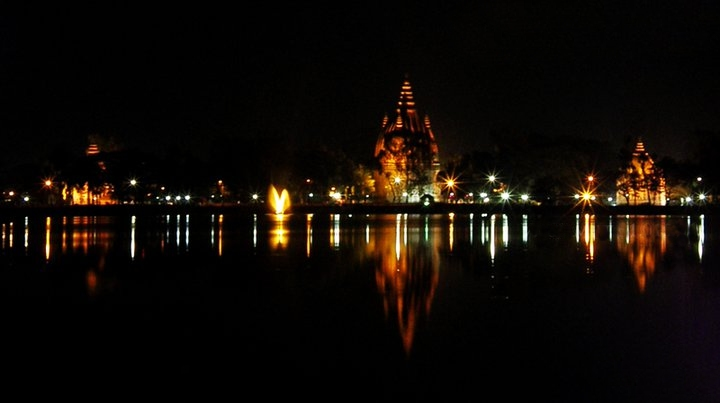
Night view of the Sivasagar lake with the three temples of Sivasagar Sivadol (highest temple in India in the middle), Vishnudol and Devidol, on its bank

Hinduism in India

- Hindu temples in Assam
  - Basistha Temple
  - Bhairabi Temple
  - Dirgheshwari temple
  - Da Parbatia
  - Hatimura Temple
  - Hayagriva Madhava Temple
  - Kamakhya Temple
  - Ketakeshwar Dewal
  - Lankeshwar Temple
  - Mahabhairav Temple
  - Mahamaya Dham
  - Navagraha temples
  - Negheriting Shiva Doul
  - Rangnath Dol
  - Rudreswar Temple
  - Sivadol
  - Sukreswar Temple
  - Ugro Tara Temple
  - Umananda Temple

=== Sports in Assam ===
Sports in Assam

- Cricket in Assam
  - Assam Cricket Association
  - Assam cricket team
  - National Sports Council of Assam Ground
- Football in Assam
  - Assam football team
  - Assam Football Association
  - Assam State Premier League

=== Symbols of Assam ===
Symbols of Assam

- State animal: One-horned rhinoceros
- State bird: White-winged wood duck
- State dance: Bihu dance
- State festival: Bihu
- State flower: Foxtail Orchids
- State language: Assamese
- State motto: Joy Aai Asom (Hail mother Assam)
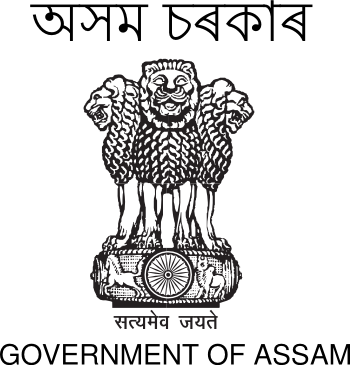
- State seal:
- State song: O Mur Apunar Desh
- State tree: Hollong (Dipterocarpus macrocarpus)

== Economy and infrastructure of Assam ==
Economy of Assam

- Energy in Assam
  - Assam State Electricity Board
- Tourism in Assam
- Transport in Assam
  - Assam State Transport Corporation
  - State highways in Assam
- Water supply and sanitation in Assam
  - Dams and reservoirs in Assam

== Education in Assam ==
Education in Assam

- Educational institutions in Assam
- Secondary Education Board of Assam
- Higher education in Assam
  - Assam Higher Secondary Education Council
  - Universities in Assam
    - State universities in Assam
      - Assam Agricultural University
      - Assam Rajiv Gandhi University of Cooperative Management
      - Assam Science and Technology University
      - Assam Women's University
      - Bodoland University
      - Cotton University
      - Dibrugarh University
      - Gauhati University
      - Krishna Kanta Handiqui State Open University
      - Kumar Bhaskar Varman Sanskrit and Ancient Studies University
      - National Law University and Judicial Academy
      - Srimanta Sankaradeva University of Health Sciences
    - Central universities in Assam
      - Assam University
      - Tezpur University
    - Private universities in Assam
      - Assam Don Bosco University
      - Assam Down Town University
      - Kaziranga University

== Health in Assam ==
- Assam Nurses Midwives & Health Visitor Council
- Hospitals in Assam
  - Gauhati Medical College and Hospital

== See also ==
- Outline of India
