= State highways in India =

Type of road in India, maintained by a state government

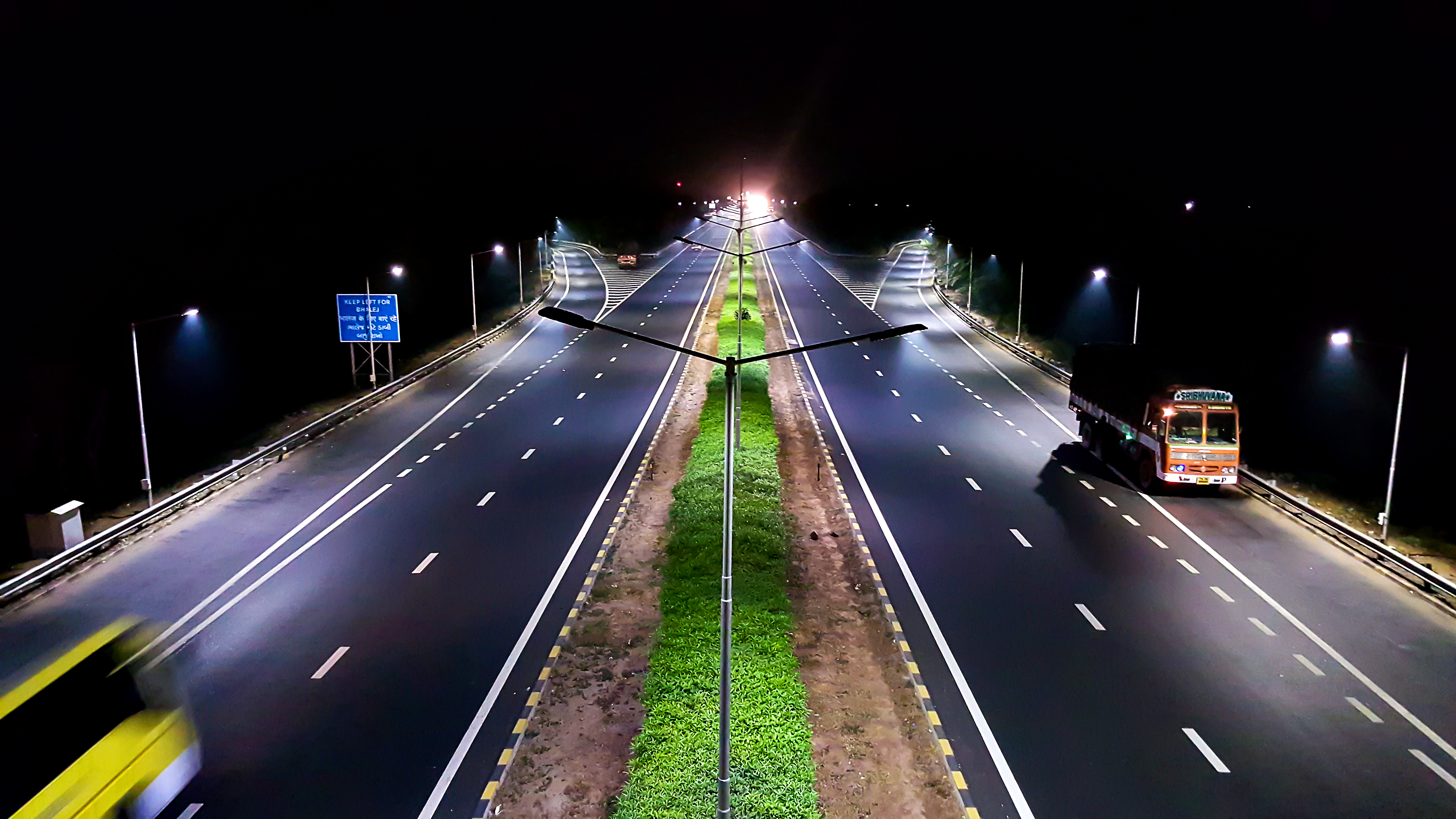
State Highway-12A, West Bengal

In India, this is the network of roads maintained by the state governments. These roads are constructed and managed by the states' Public Works Department. The state highways are usually roads that link important cities, towns and district headquarters within the state and connect them with National Highways or state highways of neighbouring states.

As of 31 March 2020, the total length of state highways was 176,166 km. As of 31 March 2016, Maharashtra had the largest share in the total length of SH roads (22.14%), followed by Karnataka (11.11%), Gujarat (9.76%), Rajasthan (8.62%) and Tamil Nadu (6.67%).

== History ==
Independent of the NHDP program, state governments have been implementing a number of state highway projects since 2000. By 2010, state highway projects worth $1.7 billion had been completed, and an additional $11.4 billion worth of projects were under implementation.

Bharatmala, a centrally-sponsored and funded road and highways project of the Government of India with a target of constructing 83,677 km (51,994 mi) of new highways, has been started in 2018. Phase I of the Bharatmala project involves the construction of 34,800 km of highways (including the remaining projects under NHDP) at an estimated cost of ₹5.35 lakh crore (US$57 billion) by 2021–22.

State Highways in India, by state and union territories
State/Union Territory	Single lane (km)	Intermediate lane (km)	Double lane (km)	Multi-lane (km)	Total (km)
Andhra Pradesh	2,092	1,001	6,902	236	10,518
Arunachal Pradesh					0
Assam					3,134
Bihar					3,766
Chhattisgarh					3,419
Delhi					
Goa					279
Gujarat					19,761
Haryana					2,523
Himachal Pradesh					1,824
Jammu and Kashmir					67
Jharkhand					1,886
Karnataka					20,738
Kerala					4,341
Madhya Pradesh					8,728
Maharashtra					33,705
Manipur					1,137
Meghalaya					1,134
Mizoram					259
Nagaland					404
Odisha					3,806
Punjab					1,393
Puducherry					637
Rajasthan					11,716
Sikkim					179
Tamil Nadu	1,743	6,586	15,267	3,389	26,985
Telangana					3,260
Tripura					689
Uttar Pradesh					8,432
Uttarakhand					1,576
West Bengal					2,991

== See also ==
- Roads in India
- New Zealand state highway network
- State highways (Italy)
