= Free State of Bengal =

Proposed country in Asia

The Free State of Bengal was a proposal to transform Bengal Province into an undivided, sovereign state at the time of the Partition of India in 1947. It sought to prevent the division of Bengal on religious grounds. The proposal originated in the pre-partition political leadership of the province, and found some cross-communal support.

A confessionalist political system was mooted for the proposed state. The proposal was not put up for a vote. The British government proceeded to partition Bengal in accordance with the Mountbatten Plan and Radcliffe Line.

== Background ==
In the first few centuries of the second millennium, the level of independence of Bengal was fought over by the governors of Bengal and by the rulers of Delhi. Bengal finally emerged as an independent polity with the establishment of the Sultanate of Bengal, formed from the unification of three principalities; Satgaon (western Bengal), Lakhnauti (northern Bengal) and Sonargaon (eastern Bengal), by Sultan Shamsuddin Ilyas Shah in 1352.

A watershed in the Bengali sultanate's history was the rise of the Sur and Mughal empires, which greatly weakened Bengal, with the two empires formally annexing Bengal in 1538 and 1576, respectively. Despite the loss of independence, a loose confederacy of fiercely independent zamindars led by Isa Khan refused to submit to Mughal hegemony, thus extending the complete conquest of Bengal to as late as the mid-17th century. The Bengal Subah emerged as the most prosperous province of the Mughal Empire, but as a result of the empire weakening, it re-emerged as an independent state under the Nawabs of Bengal from 1717 onwards. Bengal was lost to British powers after 1772, which reorganised the borders of the former Bengal Subah. The Treaty of Yandabo in 1826 facilitated the transfer of the former Bengal Subah's southeastern frontier (which stretched up to Akyab and the Kaladan River) to British Burma. Following the British annexation of Assam in 1838, the Bengali districts of Goalpara and Sylhet were transferred to the newly established North-East Frontier (later Assam Province).

The partition in 1905 reunited these districts with eastern Bengal through the formation of two new provinces: Eastern Bengal and Assam and Western Bengal. However, this was strongly protested by Bengalis, and the authorities assented to reversing this partition in 1912.

== History ==
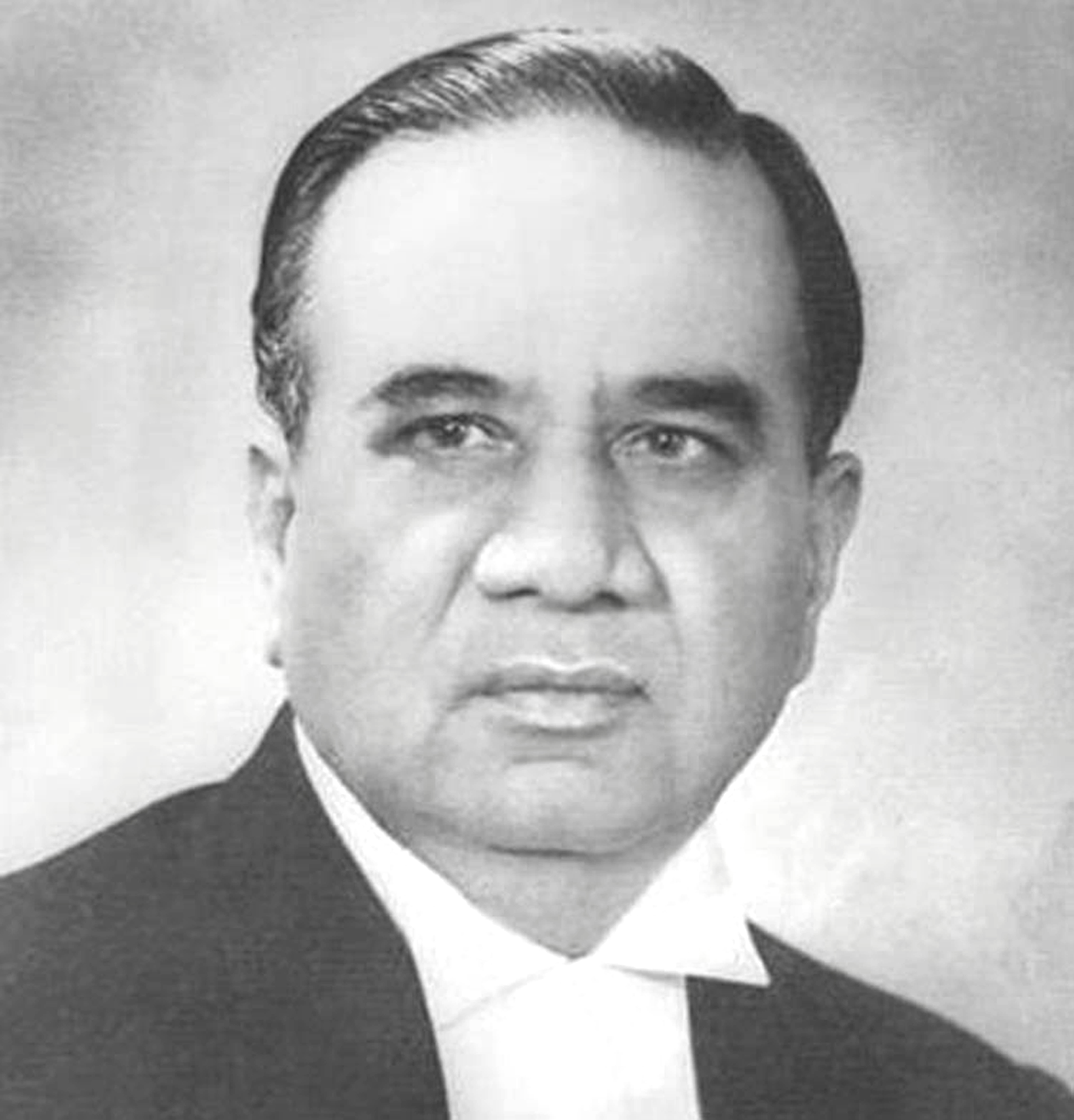
Huseyn Shaheed Suhrawardy, the last Prime Minister of Bengal

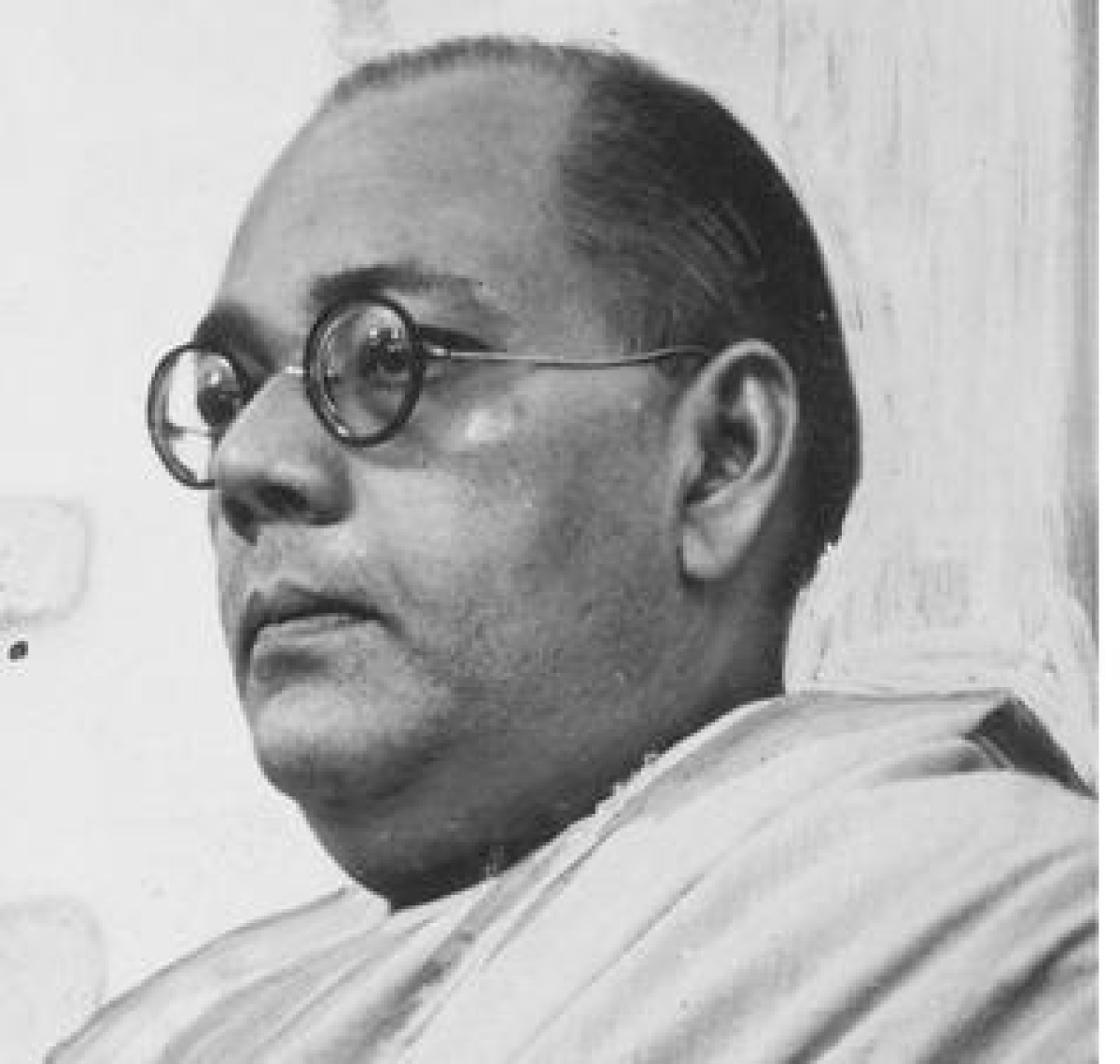
Sarat Chandra Bose in circa 1940

On 27 April 1947, Huseyn Shaheed Suhrawardy, the Prime Minister of Bengal and a Muslim League leader, addressed a press conference in New Delhi outlining his opposition to the looming partition of Bengal under the British government's plans. At the press conference, Suhrawardy made an impassioned plea for setting aside religious differences in order to create an "independent, undivided, and sovereign Bengal".

Let us pause for a moment to consider what Bengal can be if it remains united. It will be a great country, indeed the richest and the most prosperous in India capable of giving to its people a high standard of living, where a great people will be able to rise to the fullest height of their stature, a land that will truly be plentiful. It will be rich in agriculture, rich in industry and commerce and in course of time it will be one of the powerful and progressive states of the world. If Bengal remains united this will be no dream, no fantasy.

Suhrawardy, a lawyer from Midnapore, did not want to lose western Bengal to the opposing side of the Hindu-Muslim divide. The proposal elicited support from Bengali Hindu leaders Sarat Chandra Bose of the Indian National Congress, Kiran Saankar Roy (Leader of the Congress Parliamentary Party in the Bengal Assembly), and Satya Ranjan Bakshi. Prominent Bengali Muslims in support of Suhrawardy included Bengal Finance Minister Mohammad Ali Chaudhury, Bengal Revenue Minister Fazlur Rahman, Islamic scholar Shamsul Huda Panchbagi, Tippera politician Ashrafuddin Ahmad Chowdhury, Mayor of Calcutta Syed Badrudduja and Bengal Muslim League secretary Abul Hashim. For a while, the proposal was subject to significant negotiations.

On 12 May 1947, Bose and Hashim met Congress stalwart Mahatma Gandhi to discuss the United Bengal scheme. Gandhi gave an attentive hearing. Muhammad Ali Jinnah, leader of the Muslim League, was also open to the idea of an independent Bengal. On 20 May 1947, a five-point plan was outlined for a "Free State of Bengal", echoing the legacy of the name of the Irish Free State. The plan was based on a confessionalist structure, with power-sharing between Hindus and Muslims. It mirrored some of the confessionalist practices adopted in French Lebanon in 1926, where the positions of President and Prime Minister rotated among Muslims and Christians.

However, the Congress Party backtracked in its openness to the idea. On 27 May 1947, Congress leader Jawaharlal Nehru formally stated that his party would "agree to Bengal remaining united only if it remains in the Indian Union". Congress President J. B. Kripalani opposed the proposal to "save the unity of Bengal". In reply to the plea made by Ashrafuddin Chowdhury, Kripalani stated, "All that the Congress seeks to do today is to rescue as many areas as possible from the threatened domination of the League and Pakistan. It wants to save as much territory for a Free Indian Union as is possible under the circumstances. It therefore insists upon the division of Bengal and Punjab into areas for India and Pakistan respectively." Opponents included mostly Hindus in the Bengal Provincial Congress and Hindu Mahasabha, who wanted to remain part of India and didn't want to join a newly created ethnic Muslim majority state. A minority of leaders in the Bengal League favored partition and the inclusion of eastern Bengal and Assam in Pakistan. These leaders included former premier Sir Khawaja Nazimuddin.

Within the British government, there was serious consideration of the proposal. British commercial interests in Bengal required safeguards. The United States government was also briefed on the possibility of three countries emerging out of partition, including Pakistan, India, and Bengal. On 2 June 1947, British Prime Minister Clement Attlee informed the US Ambassador to the United Kingdom, Lewis Williams Douglas, that there was a "distinct possibility Bengal might decide against partition and against joining either Hindustan or Pakistan". Douglas cabled the US State Department about the meeting.

On 3 June 1947, Viceroy of India Earl Mountbatten outlined the framework principles of partition, including that in principle the partition of British India was accepted by the British Government; successor governments would be given dominion status; autonomy and sovereignty will be given to the new countries; each country will make its own constitution; princely states were given the right to either join Pakistan or India; and that Provinces can become a separate nation other than Pakistan or India. There appeared to be some popular momentum towards the concept of United Bengal. On 6 July 1947, the Sylhet referendum was held. Voters in the Sylhet division in Assam Province voted by a majority to bifurcate Sylhet from Assam and merge into Eastern Bengal.

On 20 June 1947, the Bengal Legislative Assembly met to vote on the partition of Bengal. At the preliminary joint session, the assembly decided by 126 votes to 90 that if it remained united, it should join the Constituent Assembly of Pakistan. Later, a separate meeting of legislators from West Bengal decided by 58 votes to 21 that the province should be partitioned and that West Bengal should join the Constituent Assembly of India. In another separate meeting of legislators from East Bengal, it was decided by 106 votes to 35 that the province should not be partitioned and 107 votes to 34 that East Bengal should join Pakistan in the event of partition. No vote on the United Bengal proposal was held.

== Five point plan ==
A five-point plan was outlined on 20 May 1947 after consultations with Governor Frederick Burrows. Its salient features are outlined below.

1. Bengal would be a Free State. The Free State of Bengal would decide its relations with the rest of India.
2. The Constitution of the Free State of Bengal would provide for election to the Bengal Legislature on the basis of a joint electorate and adult franchise, with reservation of seats proportionate to the population among Hindus and Muslims. The seats set aside for Hindus and Scheduled Caste Hindus would be distributed among them in proportion to their respective populations, or in such manner as may be agreed among them. The constituencies would be multiple constituencies, and the votes would be distributive and not cumulative. A candidate who got the majority of the votes of his own community cast during the elections and 25 percent of the votes of the other communities so cast, would be declared elected. If no candidate satisfied these conditions, that candidate who got the largest number of votes of his own community would be elected.
3. On the announcement by His Majesty's Government that the proposal of the Free State of Bengal had been accepted and that Bengal would not be partitioned, the present Bengal Ministry would be dissolved. A new interim Ministry would be brought into being, consisting of an equal number of Muslims and Hindus (including Scheduled Caste Hindus) but excluding the Prime Minister. In this Ministry, the Prime Minister would be a Muslim and the Home Minister a Hindu.
4. Pending the final emergence of a Legislature and a Ministry under the new constitutions, Hindus (including Scheduled Caste Hindus) and Muslims would have an equal share in the Services, including military and police. The Services would be manned by Bengalis.
5. A Constituent Assembly composed of 30 persons, 16 Muslims and 14 Hindus, would be elected by Muslim and Hindu members of the Legislature, respectively, excluding Europeans.

== Legacy ==
The United Bengal proposal has been the sole attempt by prominent Bengali leaders to establish an independent country encompassing East and West Bengal. However, since the Partition of Bengal in 1947, the region's politics have veered away from any semblance of pan-Bengali nationalism. It also became complicated with Indian support for East Pakistan's liberation as Bangladesh in 1971. Given the close Bangladesh-India relations, any notion of a pan-Bengali state is considered unrealistic. The pioneer of the United Bengal proposal, Suhrawardy, went on to become a leading statesman of Pakistan. Suhrawardy died in Beirut in 1963 in a country with a confessionalist system. In his memoirs, Sheikh Mujibur Rahman, the founder of Bangladesh and a protege of Suhrawardy, remarked, "Initially, Bengalis failed to appreciate Mr Suhrawardy's greatness. By the time they learned to value him they had run out of time".

Modern Indian nationalists discuss Bengali reunification in the context of wider Indian reunification. In the 1950s, the Calcutta-based Hindu nationalist volunteer group Sri Aurobindo Sevak Sangha included in their programme "Annulment of the ill-fated partition and reunification of India." On 4 February 1957, an East Pakistani-based newspaper, The Morning News, published an article accusing the Awami League of favoring Indian reunification, stating that "there is a party even in Pakistan which is working for reunification and it is growing in strength".

== See also ==
- Bengali nationalism
