= Shamsul Huda Panchbagi =

Bangladeshi politician

Shamsul Huda Panchbagi (Bengali: শামসুল হুদা পাঁচবাগী; 1897 – 24 September 1988) was an Islamic scholar and politician in Bangladesh. He was a two-time member of the Bengal Legislative Assembly and later founded the Emarat Party which supported the advocated for United Bengal.

== Early life and education ==
Shamsul Huda Panchbagi

Panchbagi was born in 1897, to a Bengali Muslim family in Maijbari in Gafargaon of Mymensingh. His parents were Muhammad Riaz Uddin and Umme Kulsum. He received primary education at his own home. Later, he was admitted into Rampur State Madrasa. After receiving education from there, he was admitted into Oriental College.

== Career ==
After returning to his Bengal, Panchbagi started working for the farmers and took part in movements against the British and zamindars. Panchbagi called for protest against the oppressions of zamindars. People boycotted the bazars of zamindars as a part of protest dictated by him. He also opposed their prohibition of sacrificing cow on the occasion of Eid-ul-Azha. He sacrificed a cow after Eid Prayer on the occasion of Eid-ul-Azha at Hossainpur.

Panchbagi served as a lawmaker from 1937 to 1954. He was elected as a member of the Bengal Legislative Assembly in 1937 as a Krishak Praja Party candidate. Later, he established Emarat Party in 1945. He was the president and Sanaullah was the general secretary of the party. He was re-elected as a member of the Bengal Legislative Assembly in 1946. He opposed the proposal of the formation of Pakistan. He supported United Bengal. He established a press at Panchbag. He published more than 10,000 leaflets in Bengali, English, Arabic, Urdu and Persian. He opposed the proposal of formation of Pakistan in leaflets.

Panchbagi became inactive in politics in the sixties. He supported the pro-independence fighters in the Bangladesh War of Independence. He worked to protect the women during the War of Bangladesh. He also worked to protect the minorities in 1971. He provided shelter and food to many people during the war. He also motivated the young people to take part in the War of Bangladesh.

Panchbagi was the mutawalli of Shahzadi Begum Waqf State. He was the editor and publisher of three newspapers titled Din Dunia, Hujjatul Islam and Torjumane Din. He established many educational institutions.

== Death ==
Panchbagi died on 24 September 1988 at his own home in Mymensingh at the age of 91. His grave is situated near Panchbag Jame Mosque.
