= Human rights abuses in Manipur =

Aspect of the separatist insurgency in Manipur, India

- Location of Manipur (highlighted in red)
- Location: Manipur, India
- Date: 1980s - Ongoing
- Target: Civilians and combatants
- Perpetrators: Indian security forces Separatist insurgents
- Motive: Separatism, Military clampdown

Human rights abuse is an ongoing insurgency in Manipur, a northeastern Indian state. The issue started in the 1960s due to a separatist conflict. The Indian army, paramilitary, and police personnel were sent in to mediate and prevent the ethnic disturbance. Manipur was declared a “disturbed area” by the Indian government in 1980 in the Armed Forces Special Powers Act of 1958.

The United Nations describes the 'Armed Forces Special Powers Act' as a colonial-era law that breaches contemporary international human rights standards. The UN asked the Indian government to revoke the act, saying it has no place in Indian democracy. A number of UN treaty bodies have pronounced it to be in violation of international laws as well.

== Background ==
Northeastern India is geographically and ethnically distinct from the remainder of the country, and separatist activity in the region began as early as 1954. The Manipur Insurgency began in 1964, which claimed the lives of 2,253 civilians between 1992 and 2020. Human Rights Watch has documented instances of arbitrary killings, torture, and rape by Indian security forces in the region. Anti-terrorism laws in the state have shielded security forces from being prosecuted by local residents.

Currently,⁣ 34 groups, including non-violent ones, demand independence from India. In 1999, some of these groups coalesced into an alliance called the Manipur People's Liberation Front. Of these, the three most prominent are the United National Liberation Front (UNLF), the People's Revolutionary Party of Kangleipak (PREPAK), and the PLA of Manipur. The UNLF is estimated to have 2,500 active members, the PREPAK 1,500, and the PLA 3,000.

== Armed Forces Act of 1958 ==
The Armed Forces (Special Powers) Act, 1958 was passed on 11 September 1958 by the Parliament of India. The legislation grants special powers to the Indian armed forces in regions which the act refers to as “disturbed areas”

The act has been in force in all seven northeastern states of India, and is embroiled in a decades-old violent insurgency including Manipur, for over fifty years. According to human rights organization Redress, the Indian armed forces have abused power through privileges conferred in the act by using it as a manipulative tool to conduct "killings, torture, cruel, inhuman and degrading treatment and enforced disappearances."

The act's continued application in Manipur has led to local protests, having Irom Chanu Sharmila, as one of a Manipuri civil rights activist. Sharmila has been on a longstanding hunger strike since 2 November 2000 demanding the Indian government to repeal the act. She blames for violence in Manipur and other parts of India's troubled northeast. The situation demands the strong presence of armies, as police forces aren't able to maintain law and order. Hence, the Indian parliament is still looking for a proper opportunity to lift the Act. There was another incident of a Manipuri man who was shot by a soldier of Assam Rifles in 2021. It didn't receive any national attention. But local media did cover it. The case was closed and the Assam Rifles gave compensation to the family.

== Child soldiers ==
There have been repeated reports of insurgent groups in Manipur kidnapping children to bolster their ranks with child soldiers. On 18 April 2012, for example, three teenage boys were kidnapped as they were watching a local football match.

The Manipur Alliance for Child Recruitment has denounced any kidnappings, stating "International Human Rights Law prohibits the recruitment of children below 18 years as child soldiers".

== See also ==
- 2023–2025 Manipur violence
- Insurgency in Manipur
- Insurgency in Northeast India
- Indian general election, 2014 (Manipur)
- Human rights abuses in Assam
- Human rights abuses in Jammu and Kashmir
