= List of state highways in Uttarakhand =

This is a list of state highways in Uttarakhand, India.

Highway No.	Route	Districts
1	Dehradun - Mussoorie Route	Dehradun
2	Thalisain - Chaurikhal - Chiplaghat Motor Road	Garhwal
3	Almora - Berinag - Askot Motor Road	Almora, Bageshwar, Pithoragarh
4	Khatima - Majhola Route	Udham Singh Nagar
5	Gadarpur - Dineshpur - Matkota - Haldwani Motor Road	Udham Singh Nagar, Nainital
6	Almora - Bageshwar Motor Road	Almora, Bageshwar
7	Pithoragarh - Jauljibi - Dharchula - Garthyalg Route	Pithoragarh
8	Barkot - Chakrata - Mussoorie - Chamba - Kirtinagar Route	Uttarkashi, Dehradun, Tehri
9	Lakshman Jhula - Dugadda - Raghubadhab - Dhumakot Route	Dehradun, Garhwal
10	Kathgodam - Bhimtal - Khutani - Padampur - Dhanachuli - Paharpani - Shaharfatak - Maunola - Devidhura - Lohaghat - Pancheshwar Route	Nainital, Almora, Champawat
11	Karnaprayag - Simli - Gwaldam - Bageshwar - Chaukori - Jauljibi Route	Chamoli, Bageshwar, Pithoragarh
12	Bhatrounjkhan - Ganai - Chaukhutia Route	Almora
13	Nainital - Kaladhungi - Bazpur - Doraha Motor Road	Udham Singh Nagar, Nainital
14	Khairna - Ranikhet - Ramnagar Route	Nainital, Almora
15	Uttarkashi - Ghansali - Tilwara Motor Road	Uttarkashi, Tehri, Rudraprayag
16	Barethi - Badrigad Motor Road	Uttarkashi, Tehri
17	Tyuni - Purola - Naugaon Motor Road	Dehradun, Uttarkashi
18	Chakrata - Barnigad Motor Road	Dehradun
19	Raipur - Kaddukhal Motor Road	Dehradun
20	Kalsi - Chakrata Motor Road	Dehradun
21	Haripur - Ichadi - Minas Motor Road	Dehradun
22	Herbertpur - Asan Barrage Route - Dehradun - Paonta Route	Dehradun
23	Rajpur - Kuthal Gate Route	Dehradun
24	Rishikesh - Bhaniyawala Route	Dehradun
26	Roorkee - Landaura - Laksar - Balawali Route	Haridwar
27	Roshanwala - Kudkawala - Biharigarh Route	Haridwar
28	Puhana - Jhabrera - Iqbalpur - Gurukul Narsan Route	Haridwar
29	Manglaur - Nanauta - Deoband Route	Haridwar
30	Suwakholi - Bhawan - Sarot - Chapda - Nagun Motor Road	Dehradun
31	Pauri - Devprayag - Gaja - Jajal Motor Road	Garhwal, Tehri
32	Marchula - Saraikhet - Baijro - Pokhra - Satpuli - Pauri Route	Nainital, Garhwal
33	Karnaprayag - Nauti - Paithani Motor Road	Chamoli, Garhwal
34	Rudraprayag - Pokhari - Gopeshwar Motor Road	Rudraprayag, Chamoli
35	Mayali - Guptkashi Route	Rudraprayag
37	Almora - Shaharfatak Motor Road	Almora
39	Bageshwar - Kapkot - Shama - Tejam Motor Road	Bageshwar
40	Ramnagar - Kaladhungi - Haldwani - Kathgodam - Chorgallia - Sitarganj - Bijti Motor Road	Nainital, Udham Singh Nagar
41	Nagla - Kichha Route	Udham Singh Nagar
45	Kashipur - Thakurdwara Route	Udham Singh Nagar
46	Puranpur - Madhotanda Route	Udham Singh Nagar
47	Dunda - Dhanari - Fold Motor Road	Uttarkashi
48	Mori - Sentwar - Sankri - Jakhol Motor Road	Uttarkashi
49	Tehri - Hindolakhal - Devprayag - Vyasghat - Bilkhet Motor Road	Tehri, Garhwal
50	Pauri - Khisu - Khedakhal - Khankhra Motor Road	Garhwal, Rudraprayag
51	Ghadukhal - Silogi - Gumkhal - Lansdowne - Deriakhal - Rikhanikhal - Birokhal Motor Road	Garhwal
52	Thalisain - Bungidhar - Deghat - Jainal - Manila - Dotiyal - Marchula Motor Road	Almora, Garhwal
53	Joshimath - Singhdhar - Narsingh Motor Road	Chamoli
54	Joshimath - Auli Motor Road	Chamoli
55	Diwalikhal - Bhararisain Motor Road	Chamoli
56	Banswara - Karnasil - Kyunja - Chandranagar - Mohankhal Motor Road	Rudraprayag
57	Lohaghat - Barakot - Simalkhet - Kaflikhan - Bhanoli Motor Road	Champawat, Almora
58	Bageshwar - Girechhina - Someshwar - Dwarahat - Vimandeshwar - Ida - Ranikhet Motor Road	Bageshwar, Almora
59	Suwakhan - Daudam - Chalanichhina Motor Road	Almora
60	Dangoli - Sailani - Dadimkhet - Hadbar - Dophar - Dharamghar - Kotmanya - Pankhu - Thal - Satshilling Motor Road	Bageshwar, Pithoragarh
61	Sardarnagar - Bazpur - Keshowala - Bannakheda - Bailparao - Kotabag - Kaladhungi Motor Road	Nainital, Udham Singh Nagar
62	Garjiya (Ghughutiyadhar) - Betalghat - Khairna - Suyalbari - Odakhan - Pasiyapani - Bataliya - Mukteshwar Motor Road	Nainital
63	Bhawali - Nainital - Talki - Kilbury - Pangot Motor Road	Nainital
64	Khutani - Bhawali - Dhanachuli - Patlot - Reetha Sahib - Minar - Dhunaghat - Champawat - Manch - Tamli Motor Road	Nainital, Champawat
65	Minas - Atal Motor Road	Dehradun
66	Jwalapur - Sarai - Subhashgarh - Aithal - Basedi Khadar Motor Road	Haridwar
67	Shahpur - Bhogpur - Niranjanpur - Raisi Motor Road	Haridwar
68	Bahadrabad - Dhanouri - Imlikheda - Bhagwanpur - Gagarhedi Motor Road	Haridwar
69	Lambgaon - Motna - Rajakhet - Ghansali Motor Road	Tehri
