= Brahmaputra Festival =

Religious festival in India

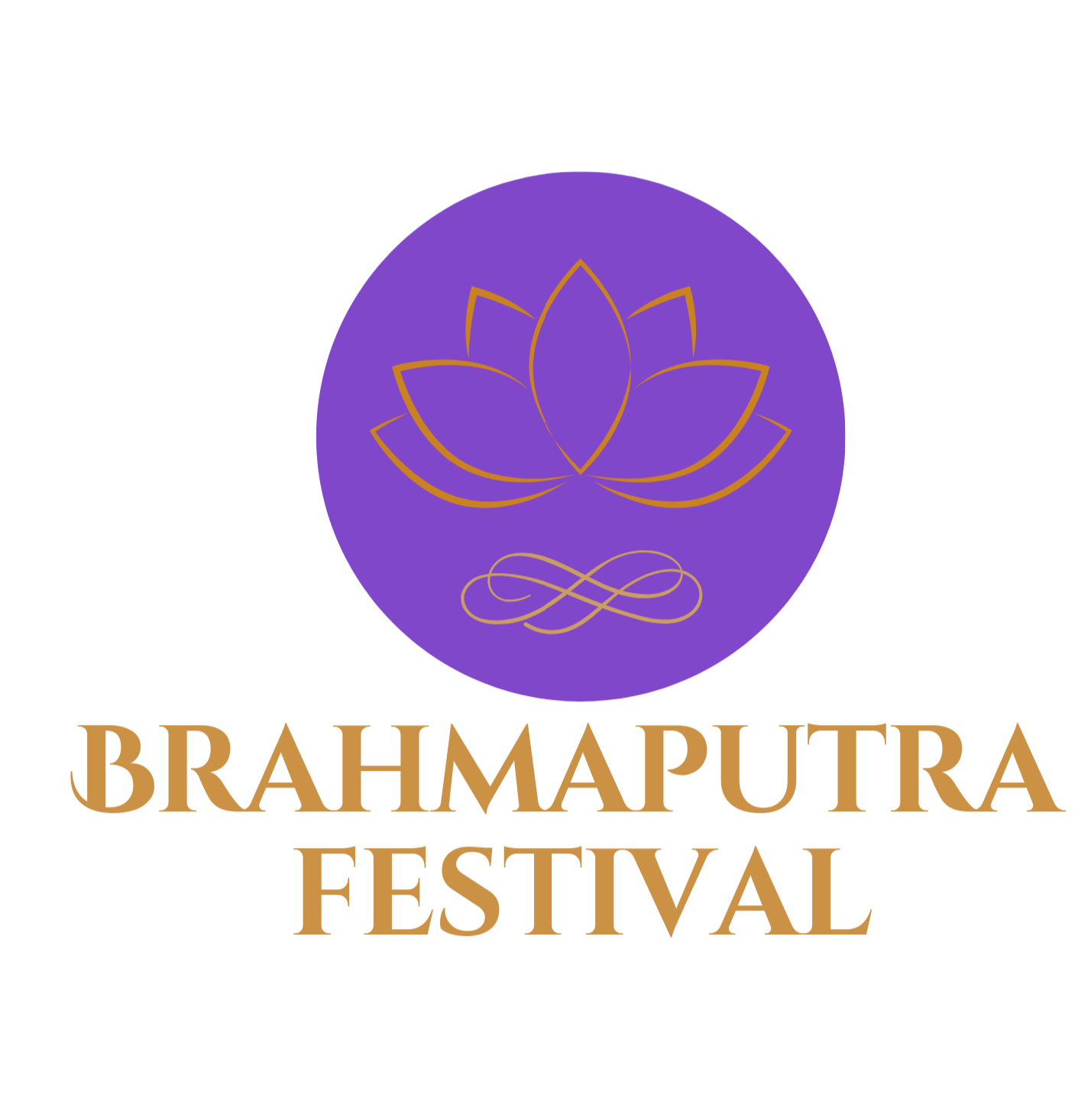
- Brahmaputra Festival logo
- Official name: Brahmaputra Festival
- Also called: Brahmaputra Music Festival
- Observed by: People of Northeast India
- Type: Cultural, Heritage, Ethnic
- Ends: Varies
- Frequency: Annually
- First time: 3–4 February, 2024

The Brahmaputra Festival is a festival held annually in Dibrugarh and Tinsukia, Assam, India. The festival celebrates the cultural heritage of the region, with music, talent shows, and exhibitions.

== Objective ==
The festival is centered on preserving the Brahmaputra river's ecosystem, and raising awareness about climate change.

== Celebration ==
The festival was first held on February 3 to 4 2024, in an open-air playground in Dibrugarh town area. The next festival is planned to be held from 19 to 29 December 2024, on the bank of the Brahmaputra River in Dibrugarh. It will feature artists and musicians from various genres, including classical, folk, rock, and pop.

There is an exhibition of products and services from local small industries, promoting tourist destinations and attractions in Assam and the Northeast, and startup companies and their products and services. There is also an exhibition of traditional Assamese handloom and handicraft products, and traditional Assamese cuisine and local delicacies are available at the festival.

In 2024, the festival will host an exchange program for the various tribes of the Northeast states of India, providing a platform for cultural exchange, knowledge sharing, and collaboration. The program will include workshops and masterclasses on traditional crafts and art forms, cultural performances and demonstrations, language and literature exchange sessions, importance of Brahmaputra as waterways and river tourism.
