= Biodiversity of Assam =

The biodiversity of Assam, a state in North-East India, makes it a biological hotspot with many rare and endemic plant and animal species. The greatest success in recent years has been the conservation of the Indian rhinoceros at the Kaziranga National Park, but a rapid increase in human population in Assam threatens many plants and animals and their habitats.

The rhinoceros, tiger, deer or chital / futukihorina (Axis axis), swamp deer or dolhorina (Cervus duvauceli duvauceli), clouded leopard (Neofelis nebulosa), hoolock gibbon, pygmy hog or nol-gahori (Porcula salvania), hispid hare, golden langur (Trachypithecus geei), golden cat, giant civet, binturong, hog badger, porcupine, and civet are found in Assam. Moreover, there are abundant numbers of Gangetic dolphins, mongooses, giant squirrels and pythons. The largest population of wild water buffalo is in Assam.

The major birds in Assam include the blue-throated barbet or hetuluka (Megalaima asiatica), white-winged wood duck or deuhnah (Asarcornis scultulata), Pallas's fish eagle or kuruwa (Haliaeetus leucoryphus), great pied hornbill or rajdhonesh (Buceros bicornis homrai), Himalayan golden-backed three-toed wood-pecker or barhoituka (Dinopium shorii shorii), and migratory pelican.

== Gallery ==
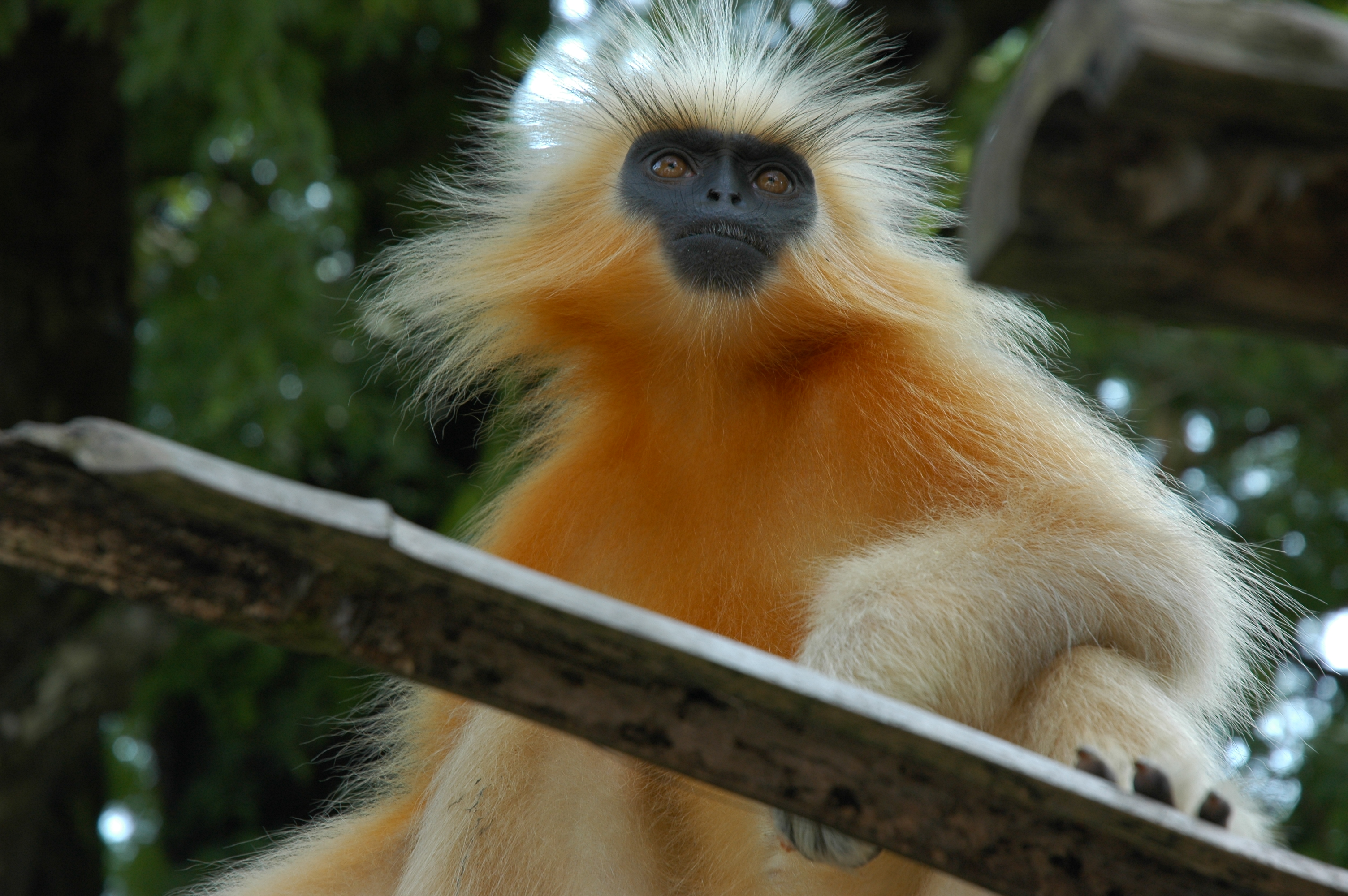
A golden langur

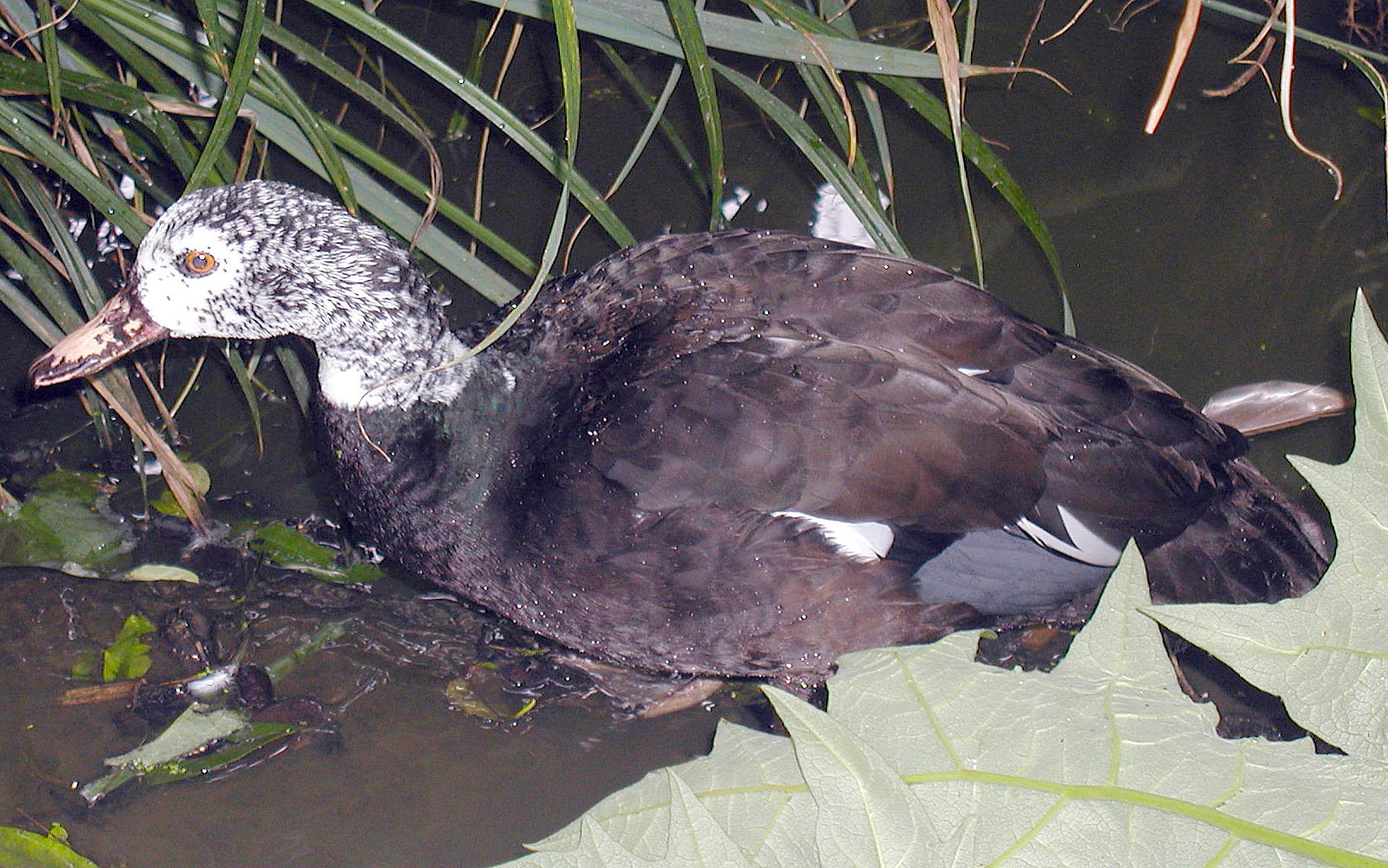
A white-winged wood duck or deuhnah

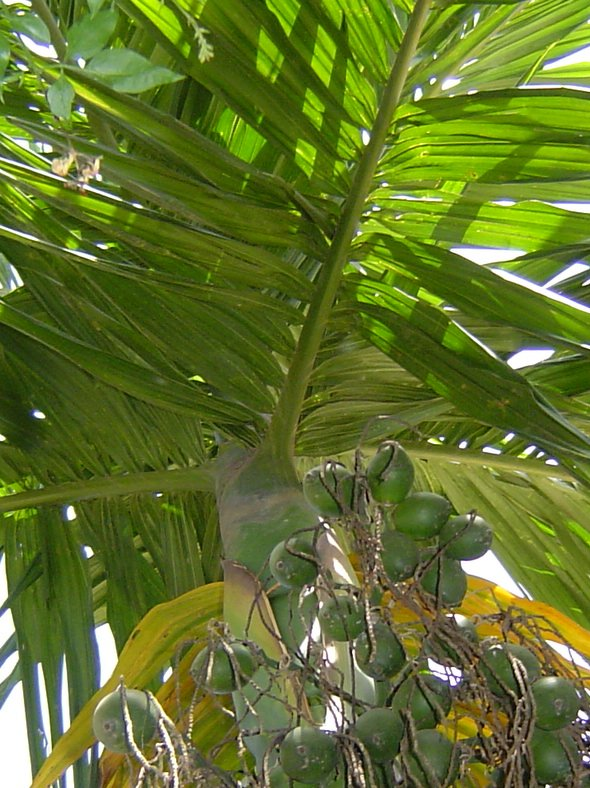
Areca nut tree or tamul goss

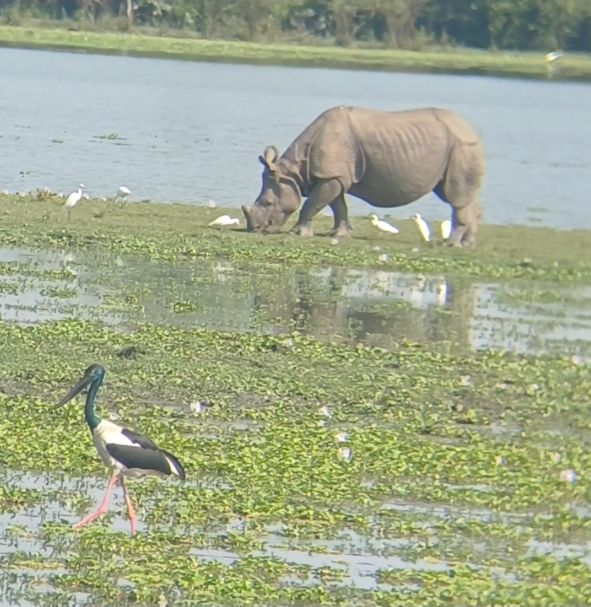
An Indian rhinoceros, with a cattle egret and black-necked stork

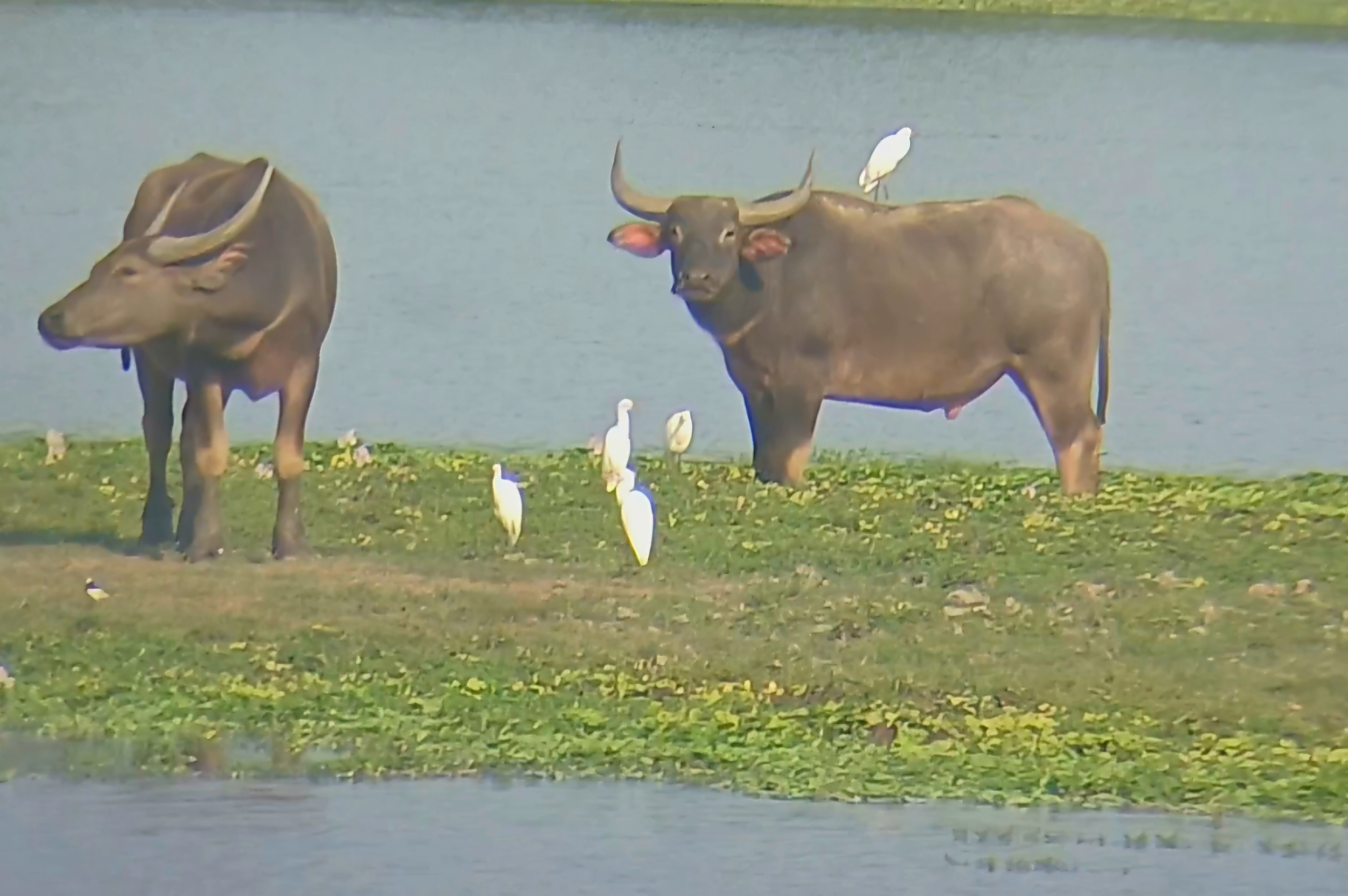
The endangered ancestors of domestic buffaloes and their symbiotic partners, cattle egrets

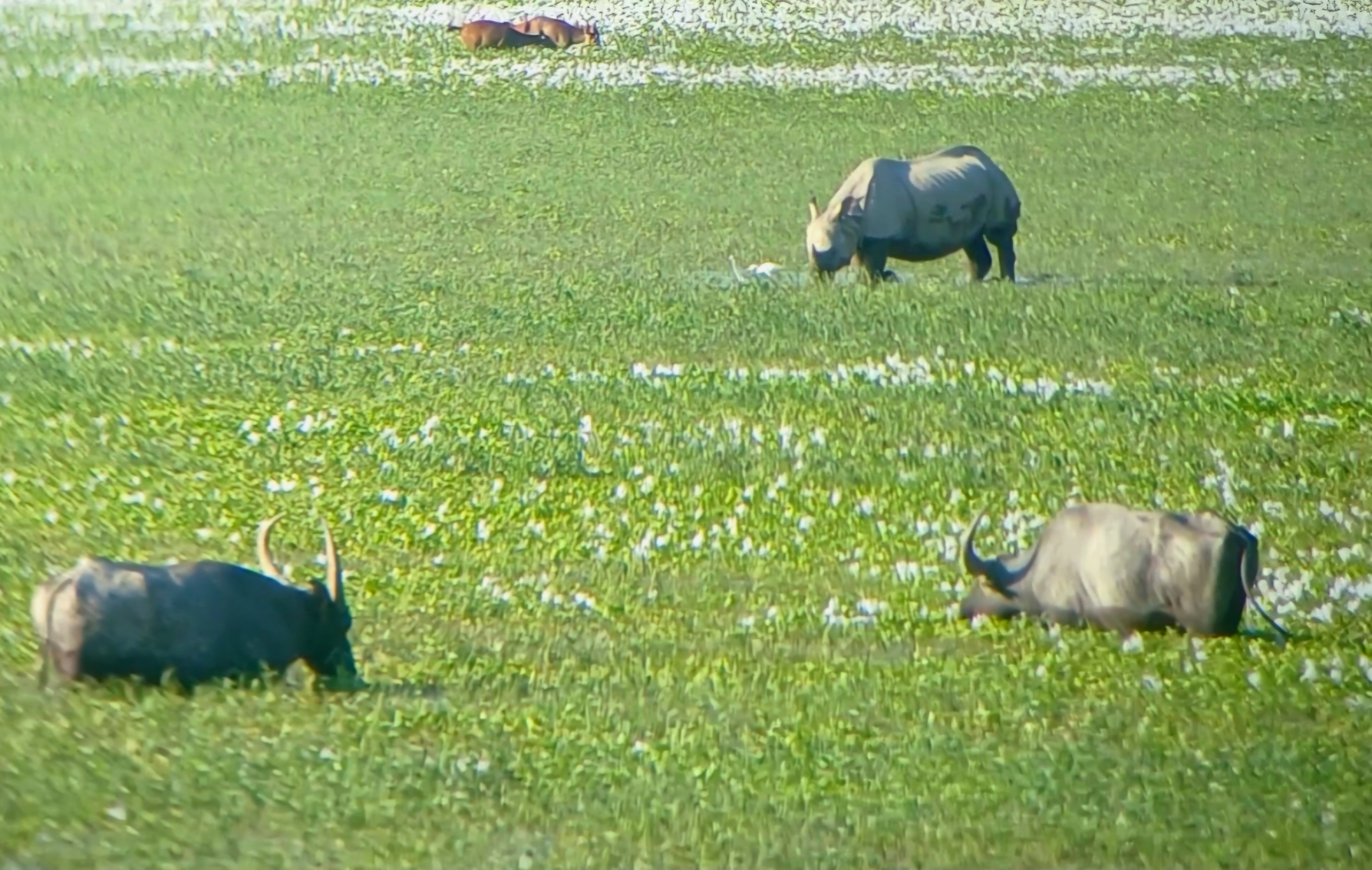
Two water buffalo, an Indian rhinoceros and two Indian hog deer in Kaziranga National Park

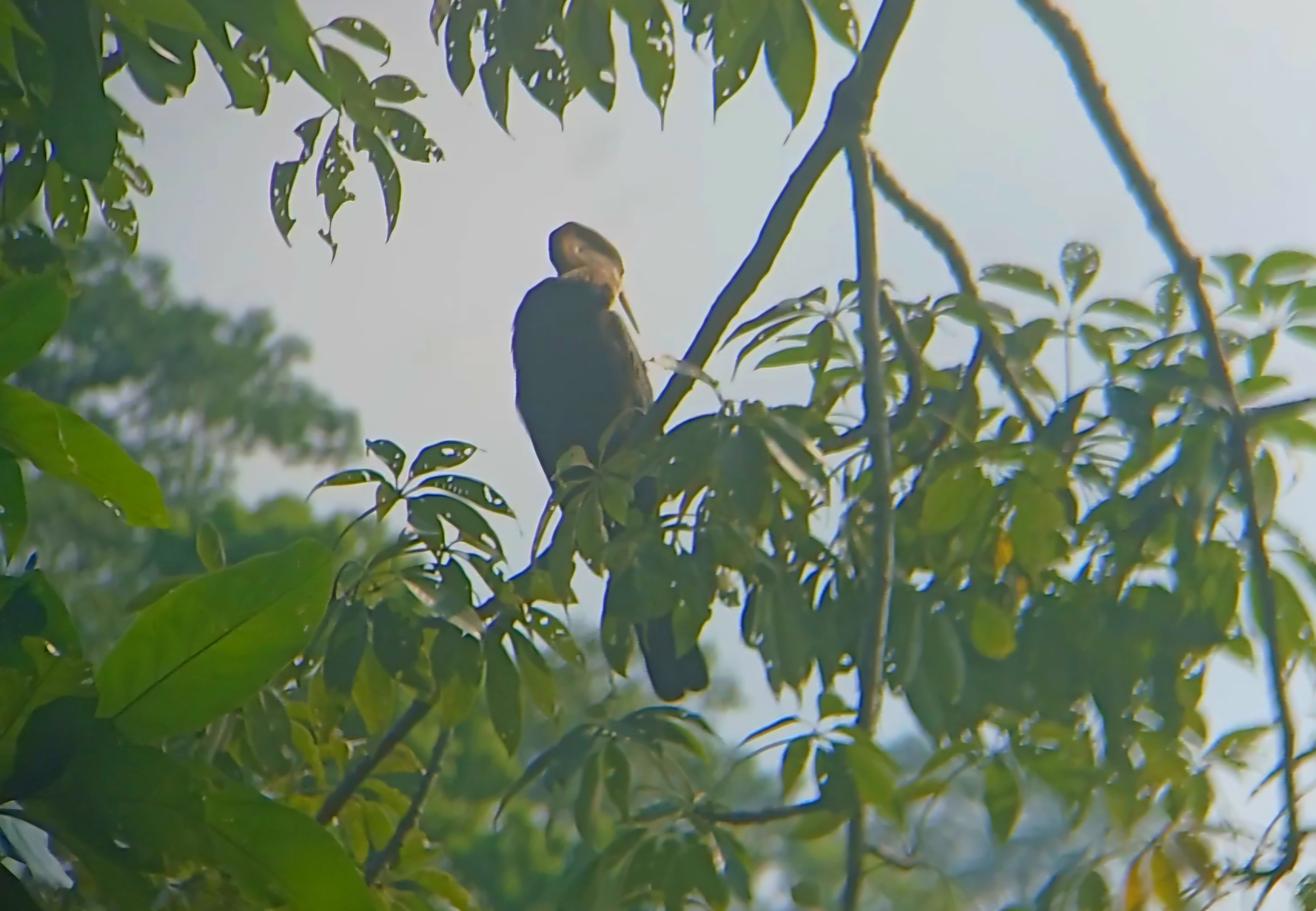
A darter by the Brahmaputra River

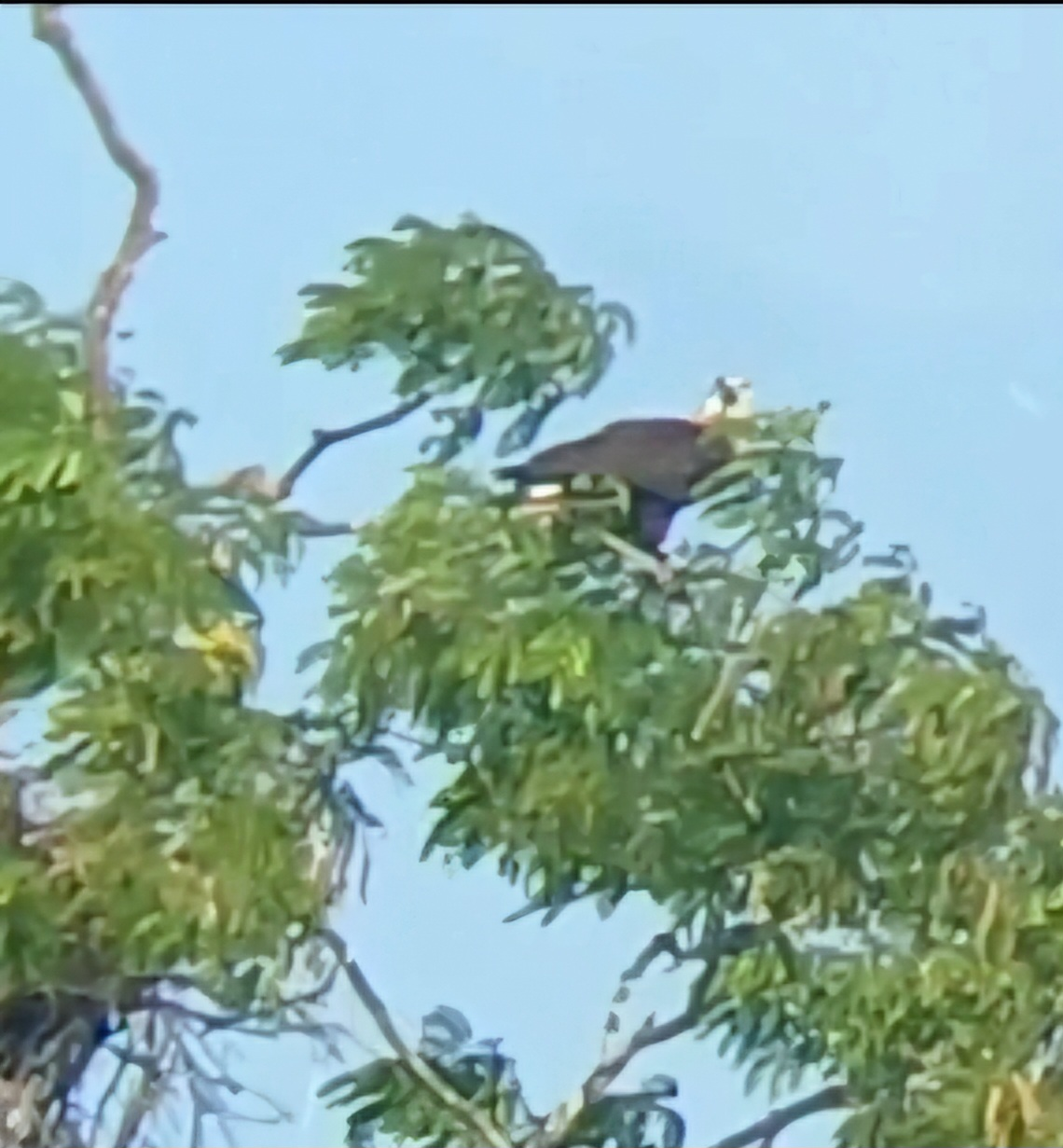
An endangered Pallas' fish eagle and its nest in its stronghold

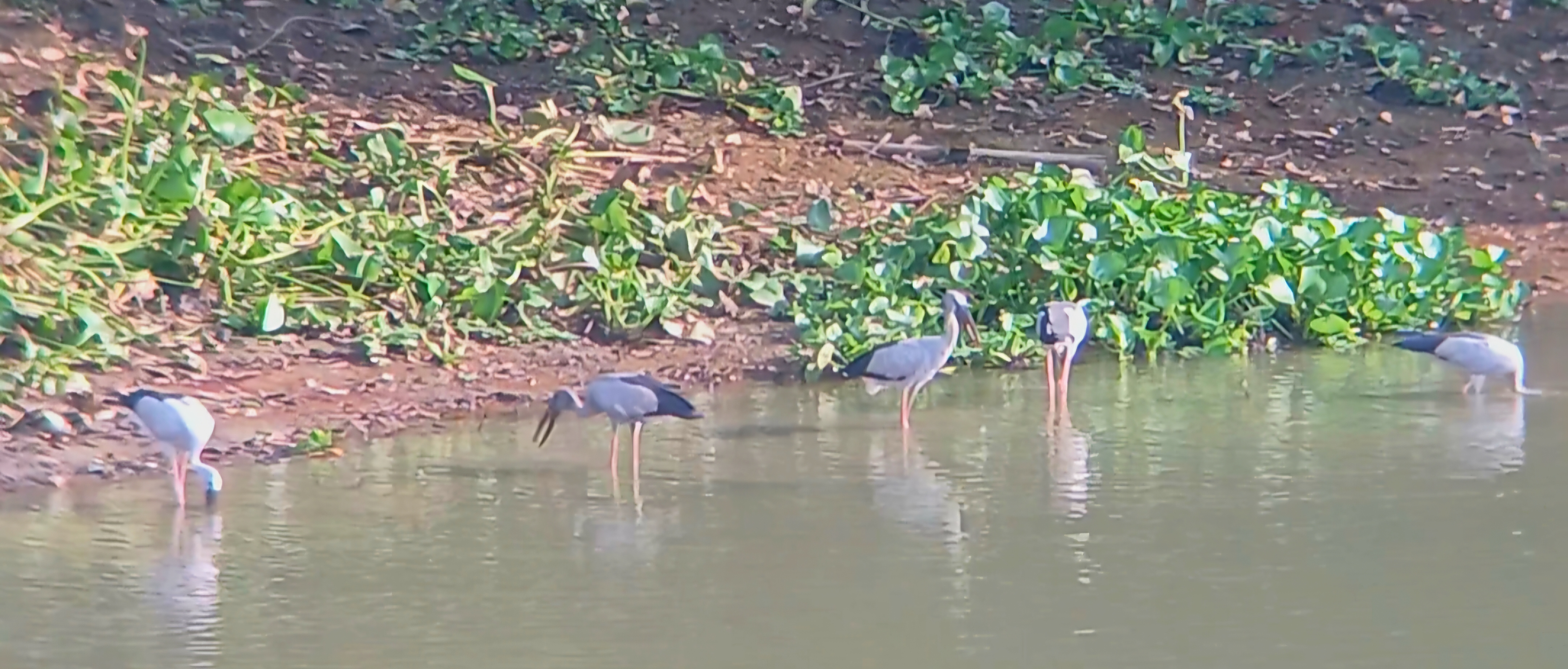
Asian openbill storks

== See also ==
- List of national parks of Assam
- List of wildlife sanctuaries of Assam
- Brahmaputra Valley semi-evergreen forests
- Physical geography of Assam
- Rhino poaching in Assam
