= Human rights abuses in Assam =

- Location of Assam (highlighted in red)
- Location: Assam, India
- Date: Ongoing
- Target: Civilians and combatants
- Perpetrators: Indian security forces Separatist insurgents
- Motive: Military clampdown

Human rights abuses in Assam have been compared to the situation of human rights abuses in other insurgency-affected areas of northeast India.

The Indian Army has conducted massive search operations in "thousands of villages in Assam" during which actions were taken against peoples that included civilians and young people of having militant sympathies. As per the Assamese villagers having sympathy for militant groups, has claimed that they have been threatened, harassed, raped, assaulted, and killed by soldiers who attempt to fright them into identifying "suspected militants. " Though proofs have been provided by the officials, the tribals claims that Arbitrary arrests and kidnappings by security forces are common in Assam. Deaths in custody have occurred due to torture as well as alleged encounters as per the allegations by locals many of whom are known to be supportive to Militant organization and have supported violence by insurgents.

A Human Rights Watch report notes that journalists and human rights activists have been arrested for falsely reporting on human rights abuses. Assam continues to be one of the forefront states where the claims of human rights abuses have been committed by India. Resultant secessionist and pro-independence movements have intensified the political situation, with widespread allegations of human rights abuses being committed by Indian security forces yet without any concrete proofs for allegations. Freedom House stated in their 2013 report on India that journalists in rural areas and regions coping with insurgencies — including Assam — are vulnerable and face pressure from both sides of the conflicts.

Recruitment of child soldiers is common by separatists. It is estimated that 9-10% of insurgent soldiers are girls alone, numbering 3000-4000 with children as young as 12 years old.

It has also been established that separatist groups, including ULFA, from Assam have joined with dissidents from Bhutan; these links culminated in Blasts in Assam in October 2008 that killed 84 people.

== See also ==
- Indian general election, 2014 (Assam)
- Insurgency in Northeast India
- Human rights abuses in Kashmir
- Human rights abuses in Jammu and Kashmir
- Human rights abuses in Manipur
- Human rights in India
