= List of state highways in Assam =

This is a list of state highways in Assam, India.

Number	Length (km)	Length (mi)	Southern or western terminus	Northern or eastern terminus	Formed	Removed	Notes
SH 1	210.2	130.6	Kamargaon - Kakadunga - Kamarbandha - Amguri (District Boundary) - Dillighat - Joypur		—	—	
SH 2	142.2	88.4	Bongaigaon - NH-31 Junction - NH-31B Junction - Santoshpur - Doalasal (Dist. Boundary) - Adabari - Amingaon (Check Gate)		—	—	
SH 3	150	93	Narengi Tiniali - Gobardhan Bazar - Bhakat Gaon - Morigaon Police Point - Barpujia - Naltali - Jagiroad - Bhakatgaon		—	—	
SH 3A	7	4.3	Jagiroad	Bhakatgaon	—	—	
SH 3B	18.4	11.4	Chamata Pathar Tinilai- Kolongpar - Mayang Tiniali		—	—	
SH 4	60.3	37.5	Mangaldoi, Police point - Golubandha - Chamrang, Bhutan Border		—	—	
SH 5	36.9	22.9	Khalishabhita - Kokrajhar (Dist. Boundary) - Phutkibari - Shefanguri		—	—	
SH 6	91.3	56.7	Simalguri - Barpeta Railway Station - Manas National Sanctuary Gate - Basbari - Kumari Kate		—	—	
SH 7	10.8	6.7	Barpeta - NH31C		—	—	
SH 8	18.2	11.3	Bhawanipur	Barpeta	—	—	
SH 9	60.9	37.8	Kalitakuchi - Bijulighat - Amrikhowa - Nagaon Market Tiniali		—	—	
SH 9A	17.4	10.8	Pathsala Barsimla Sarthebari		—	—	
SH 10	101.2	62.9	Barama - Niz Dhamdhama - Dhamdhama - Bangalipara - Paneri - Rowta		—	—	
SH 10A	24.6	15.3	Barama (Mekori Chowk) - Nikashi		—	—	
SH 11	53	33	Korim Chowk - Khoirabari - Barangajuli		—	—	
SH 12	31.7	19.7	Agia on NH-37 - Lakhimpur Town		—	—	
SH 12A	7.4	4.6	Goalpara	Solmari	—	—	
SH 13	27.4	17.0	Mission Chowk - Tangni River (Dist. Boundary) - Kharupetia		—	—	
SH 14	43.1	26.8	Bahalpur - Choraikhola - Karigaon		—	—	
SH 15	30.6	19.0	Kahibari (NH-37) - Morigaon (Dist. Boundary) - Bhakatgaon, Kolong River - Jorabari - Kahuwahati - Nagaon (Dist. Boundary) - Barduwa		—	—	
SH 16	163.4	101.5	Amsoigate - Borgaon, Forest Gate - Baithalahgsho - Doyangmukh, Diyung River, Dist Boundary - Dehangi		—	—	
SH 17	80.6	50.1	Amoni Tinaili - Kathiatoli Chariali - Kampur Town Railway Overbridge - Kampur Town Old Bus Syndicate - Raha College		—	—	
SH 18	112.1	69.7	Nagaon - Kampur Town Railway Overbridge - Baithalangsho - Hamren - Khanduli Aamei		—	—	
SH 19	81.4	50.6	Hamren, Forest Gate - Tumpring - Jamuna River -		—	—	
SH 20	173.2	107.6	Haflong Tiniali - Umrangsc(13km), Near police Station - Khandong (Meghalaya State Boundary) - Jatinga(NH-54Extension)		—	—	
SH 20A	54.1	33.6	New Sangbar	Ditakcherra, NH-54	—	—	
SH 21	41.4	25.7	Maal Pani Chariali - Lohitmukh - Kamalabari		—	—	
SH 22	45.7	28.4	Gogamukh - Bardo (Dist. Boundary) - Bomdhuni - Telija		—	—	
SH 23	46.9	29.1	Lahowal - Deohal (Dist. Boundary) - Deohal Tiniali - Tinsukia Police point		—	—	
SH 24	49.3	30.6	Deohal Tiniali (Dist. Boundary) - Madhuban Tiniali - Madhuting Gaon - Dihing Patkai - Digboi (Dist. Boundary)		—	—	
SH 25	8.3	5.2	Jagun(Siva Mandir) - Namchila, A P State boundary		—	—	
SH 26	45.7	28.4	Tingrai Tiniali - Sukanguri Gate (State Boundary) - Deomali Gate (State Boundary) - Kothalguri Tiniali)		—	—	
SH 27	56.9	35.4	Moran	Naharkatia	—	—	
SH 28	8.5	5.3	Gouripur	Dhubri	—	—	
SH 31	24.7	15.3	Jorhat - Marioni - Tsutapela Chechgate		—	—	
SH 32	49.4	30.7	Jorhat - Teliapatty - Kamargaon Tiniali - Borhola Tiniali - Nagabat (Merapani)		—	—	
SH 33	63	39	Jorhat - Teliapatty - Kamargaon (Welcome Gate) - Borhola Tiniali - Nagabat (Merapani)		—	—	
SH 34	49.8	30.9	Dergaon	Merapani	—	—	
SH 35	84.5	52.5	Kohra, Bogorijuri(IORA) - Morphulani TE Board - Rangajan(NH-39) - Golaghat(Tokani Circle)		—	—	
SH 36	71.7	44.6	Lumding (Dist. Boundary) - Rangapahar - Tilabasti (Dist. Boundary)		—	—	
SH 36A	14.9	9.3	Manja	Diphu Chowk	—	—	
SH 37	87.6	54.4	Dwarbond (NH-54) - Ghantibari - Mahur Town		—	—	
SH 38	28.3	17.6	Kakain Tiniali (NH-44) - Silchar(Manipur Basti, NH-53)		—	—	
SH 39	86.3	53.6	Rangirkhari Point(Silchar) - Borakai TE (Dwarbond) - Hailakandi(NH-154) - Rakhal Basti - Poamara(NH-44)		—	—	
SH 40	15.6	9.7	Bhagabazar(NH-54) - Mizoram State Boradar		—	—	
SH 41	14.9	9.3	Singimari Chowk	Hajo	—	—	
SH 42	41.8	26.0	Ghilamara	Butikur Tiniali	—	—	
SH 43	25.1	15.6	Laluk Bus Stand	Narayanpur Tiniali (NH-52)	—	—	
SH 44	35.4	22.0	Bokajan - Gariyal Dhobi (Dist Boundary) - Uriyamghat (BB Junior College)		—	—	
SH 45	41	25	Soibari	Borgang	—	—	
SH 46	120.2	74.7	Dudhnoi Traffic Point - Khanshabhita - Fakirganj		—	—	
SH 47	74.6	46.4	Basnaghat - Niz-Dhing - Moirabari - Bordwar Gate		—	—	
SH 48	27.3	17.0	Dibang Ghat (Sadiya) - Islampur Tiniali - Athmile Tiniali - Sunpura, Balijan River		—	—	
