= Chutia (surname) =

Chutia, Sutia and Sutiya are variants of a surname from Assam, India. It is mainly used by the Chutia people.

Notable people with the surname include:

- Joyanti Chutia (born 1948), Indian physicist
