= Kamarbandha =

Kamarbandha is a village in Golaghat district of Assam state of India. Kamarbandha is surrounded by Golaghat East Tehsil towards North, Golaghat Tehsil towards South, Kakodonga Tehsil towards East, Morongi Tehsil towards West.The nearest railway station to Kamarbandha is Kamarbandha Ali which is located in and around 0.3 kilometer distance.
