= Rongali =

Cultural festival in Guwahati, India

Rongali Utsav is a festival organised in Guwahati every year. The festival showcases tribal culture of Assam to the world.
