= Brahmaputra Beach Festival =

Open-air festival in Guwahati, India

Brahmaputra Beach Carnival
- Genre: Folk, Modern
- Begins: 15 January 2027
- Ends: 16 January 2027
- Frequency: Annually
- Locations: Guwahati, Assam
- Years active: 19XX-2004, 2012-present
- Previous event: 2026
- Next event: 2027
- Major events: Traditional music, dance, crafts, sports etc.

Brahmaputra Beach Festival or Carnival is an annual open-air festival held in Guwahati on the ravine beaches of Brahmaputra River. It is held every year in the month of January to coincides with Magh Bihu, the harvest festival in Assam.

== Objective ==
The aim of the festival is to promote indigenous culture, crafts and popularising traditional sports of Assam. It is said to be inspired from various festivals held in the southern states of India. It is a confluence of the conventional with the modern and represents the culture and tradition of the state of Assam.

== Sponsorship ==
The festival is organized by the Assam Boat Racing and Rowing Association (ABRRA) in Guwahati in collaboration with the Assam Tourism Development Corporation (ATDC).

== Events ==
During the season, the beaches are occupied to set up fairs. The festival includes various events like Beach cricket, Beach volleyball, water rafting, canoeing and wind surfing, ice skating, kayaking and Aero sports like ballooning, paragliding and hang gliding. Visitors and tourists can participate in these events and show their skills. Traditional games like elephant races, egg breaking and cock fighting are also held along with these modern and technically advanced games. Competitions like Sit and draw and kite flying are also held where children can take part. Exhibition of traditional craft is also a part of the festival.

== See also ==
- Culture of Assam
