= Physical geography of Assam =

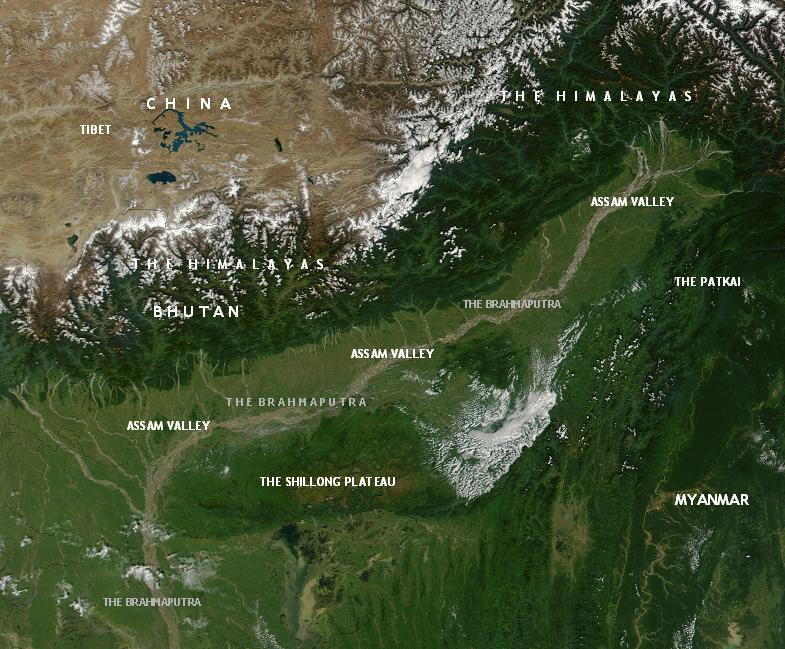
Assam Valley and Environs

This article discusses the geological origin, geomorphic characteristics, and climate of the northeastern Indian state of Assam. Extending from 89° 42′ E to 96° E longitude and 24° 8′ N to 28° 2′ N latitude, it has an area of 78,438 km^{2}, similar to that of Ireland or Austria.

== Geology ==
Plate Movements and Rise of the Himalayas

Geologically, as per the plate tectonics, Assam is in the easternmost projection of the Indian Plate, where it thrusts underneath the Eurasian Plate creating a subduction zone. It is postulated that due to the northeasterly movement of the Indian plate, the sedimentary layers of an ancient geosyncline called the Tethys (in between Indian and Eurasian Plates) were pushed upward to form the Himalayas. It is estimated that the height of the Himalayas is increasing by 4 cm each year. Therefore, Assam possesses a special geomorphic environment, with large plains and dissected hills of the South Indian Plateau system abutting the Himalayas to the north, north-east and east.

Geomorphic studies also conclude that the Brahmaputra is an antecedent river, older than the Himalayas, which has entrenched itself since they started rising. It often crosses higher altitudes in the Himalayas eroding at a greater pace than the increase in the height of the mountain range to sustain its flow. The height of the surrounding regions still increasing forming steep gorges in Arunachal.

Some say that the "flow" is usually neutral. The flow includes water, land, air, and other resources too. Entering the Assam region, the Brahmaputra becomes a braided river, and, along with its tributaries, creates the flood plain of the Brahmaputra Valley.

== Physiography ==
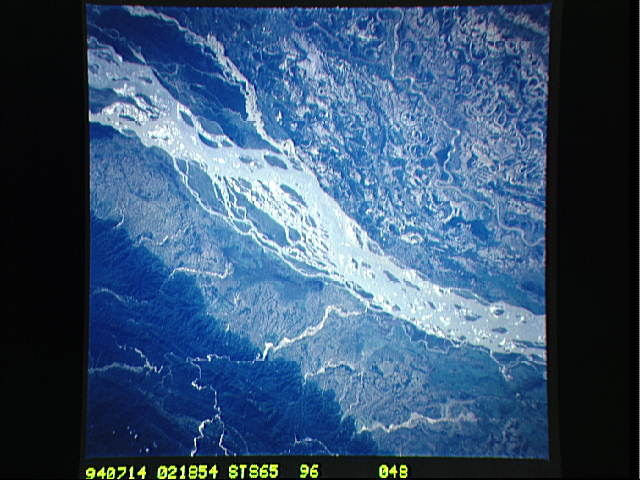
The Braided River Brahmaputra

The state of Assam comprises three physiographical divisions, namely, the Brahmaputra Valley, the Barak Valley and the Karbi-Anglong and the North-Cachar hills.

The Brahmaputra Valley in Assam is approximately 80 to 100 km wide and almost 1000 km long. The width of the river itself is 16 km at many places within the valley.

The hills of Karbi Anglong and Dima Hasao district and those in and around Guwahati and North Guwahati (along with the Khasi and Garo Hills) are originally parts of the South Indian Plateau system. These are eroded and dissected by the numerous rivers in the region. The average height of these hills in Assam varies from 300m to 400m to a maximum of about 2000m almost. There are also hills in the North Bank bordering Bhutan and Arunachal Pradesh as well as those near Burma.

The southern Barak Valley is separated by the Karbi Anglong and North Cachar Hills from the Brahmaputra Valley in Assam. The Barak originates from the Barail Range in the border areas of Assam, Nagaland, and Manipur and flowing through the district of Cachar, it converges with the Brahmaputra in Bangladesh. Barak Valley in Assam is a small valley with an average width and length of approximately 40 to 50 km.

== Mineral resources ==
Assam is endowed with petroleum, natural gas, coal, limestone and many other minor minerals such as magnetic quartzite, kaolin, sillimanites, clay and feldspar. A small quantity of iron ore is also available in western parts of Assam.

The Upper Assam districts are major reserves of oil and gas. Petroleum was discovered in Assam in 1889. It is estimated that Assam and surrounding region possess around 150 million tonnes of petroleum reserves. Presently, Assam is the 3rd largest producer of petroleum (crude) and natural gas in the country accounting for 16% and 8% respectively of the total production of this mineral in the country.

A Tertiary coal belt is located in Tinsukia, Dibrugarh, Sivasagar, Karbi Anglong and Dima Hasao districts with an estimated reserve of 370 million tonnes. Assam coal is friable in nature and has high sulfur content. It is mainly utilized by local railways, steamers, and hydro power stations. Low moisture, low volatile cooking coal has been discovered in the Hallidayga Singamari area.

Assam has rich limestone reserves. The major reserves of limestone are in Dima Hasao and Karbi Anglong districts. A total reserve of 97 million tonnes of limestone has been found in these two districts and almost half of the reserve is of cement grade. Moreover, there is an estimated reserve of 365 million tonnes of limestone near Umrangshu in Dima Hasao district. Among the minor minerals, there are quartzite reserves in the Nagaon district, kaolin reserves in Karbi Anglong and the Lakhimpur districts and sillimanite-bearing rocks in Karbi Anglong district.

== Climatic characteristics ==
With the 'Tropical Monsoon Rainforest Climate', Assam is a temperate region and experiences heavy rainfall and humidity. Winter lasts from late October to late February. The minimum temperature is 6 to 8 degrees Celsius. Nights and early mornings are foggy, and rain is scanty. Summer starts in mid May, accompanied by high humidity and rainfall. The maximum temperature is 35 to 38 degrees Celsius, but the frequent rain reduces this. The peak of the monsoons is during June. Thunderstorms and frequent storms known as Bordoisila are frequent during the afternoons during the Bihu season.

== Biogeography and biodiversity ==
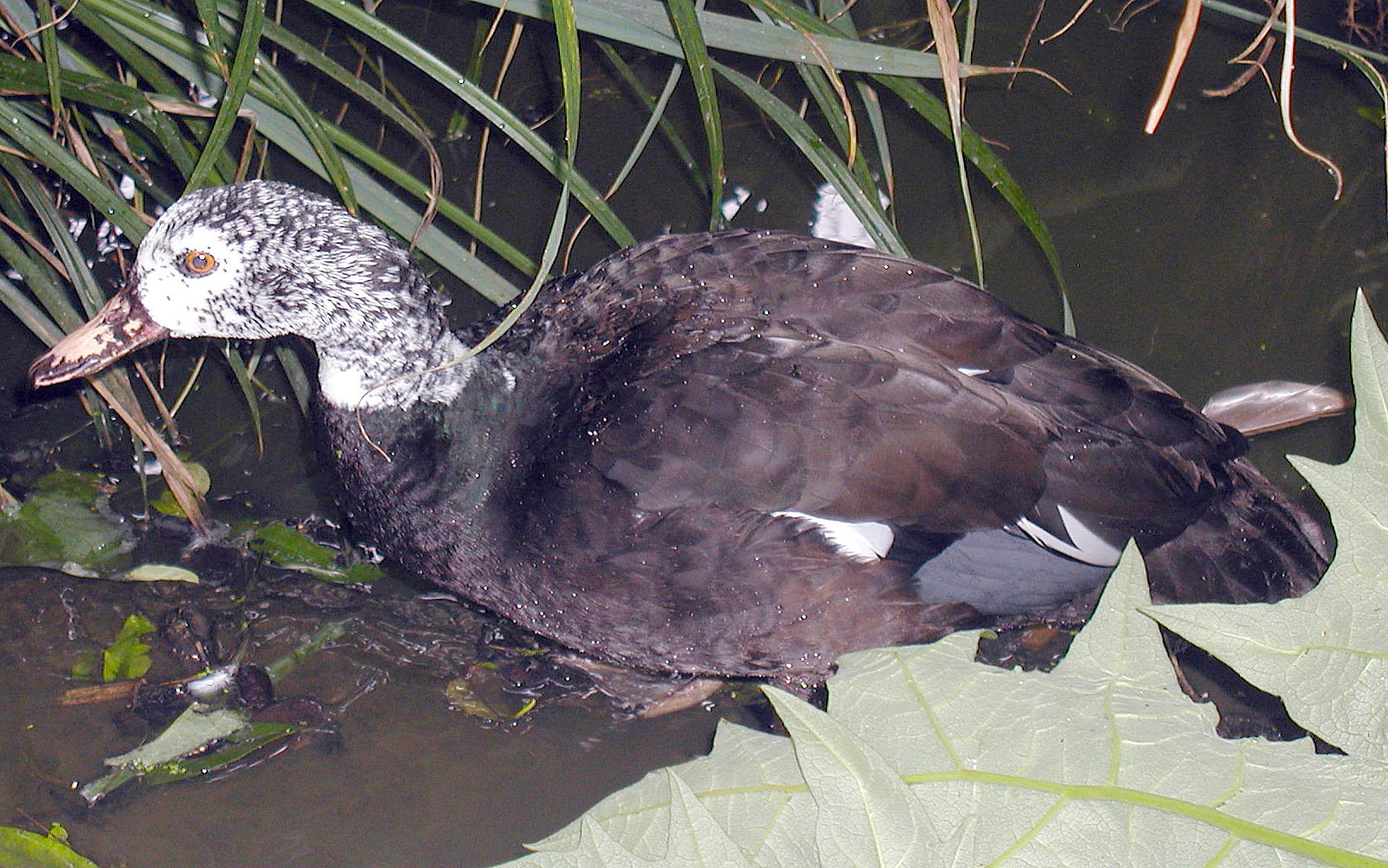
A white-winged wood duck or deuhnah

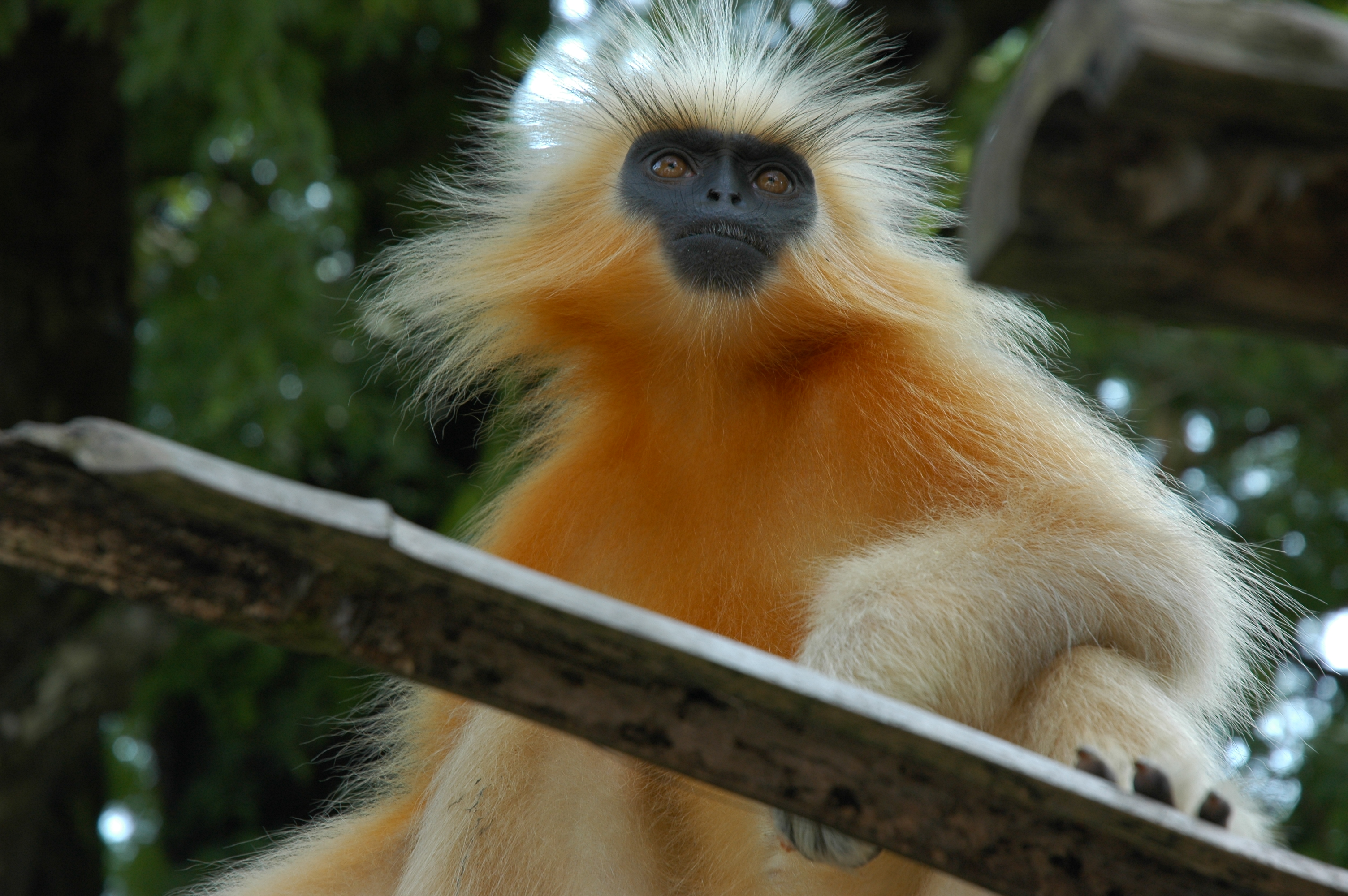
A golden langur

Assam is a part of the Biodiversity Hotspot area. There are a number of tropical rainforests in Assam, including the Dehing Patkai rainforest. Moreover, there are riverine grass lands, bamboo orchards and numerous wetland ecosystems. Many of these areas have been protected by developing national parks and reserved forests. The Kaziranga and Manas are the two World Heritage Sites in the region. The Kaziranga is the home for the rare Indian rhinoceros, while Manas is a tiger sanctuary.

Apart from the rhinoceros and the tiger, the spotted deer or chital / futukihorina (Axis axis), the swamp deer or dolharina (Cervus duvauceli duvauceli), the clouded leopard (Neofelis nebulosa), the hoolock gibbon or holoubandor, pygmy hog or nol-gahori (Sus salvanis), the wild buffalo, the hispid hare, the golden langur (Chloropsis cochinchinensis), the golden cat, the giant civet, the binturong, the hog badger, the civet cat and the porcupine are all found in the state. Moreover, there are abundant numbers of Gangetic dolphins, mongooses, giant squirrels and pythons.

A few of the major birds in Assam are: the blue-throated barbet or hetuluka (Megalaima asiatica), the white-winged wood duck or deuhnah (Cairina scultulata), the Pallas's fish eagle or kuruwa (Haliaeetus leucoryphus), the great pied hornbill or rajdhonesh (Buceros bicornis homrai), the Himalayan golden-backed three-toed woodpecker or barhoituka (Dinopium shorii shorii), and the migratory pelican.

Assam is also known for orchids and also for valuable plant species and forest products.

== Natural disasters ==
The region is also prone to natural disasters. High rainfall, deforestation, and other factors which have resulted in annual floods. These often cause widespread loss of life, livelihood and property. The region is also prone to earthquake, mild tremors are common, but strong earthquakes are rare. There have been three strong earthquakes: in 1869 the bank of the Barak sank by 15 ft. In 1897 there was a tremor which measured 8.3 on the moment magnitude scale, and another in 1950 which measured 8.6.
