= British annexation of Assam =

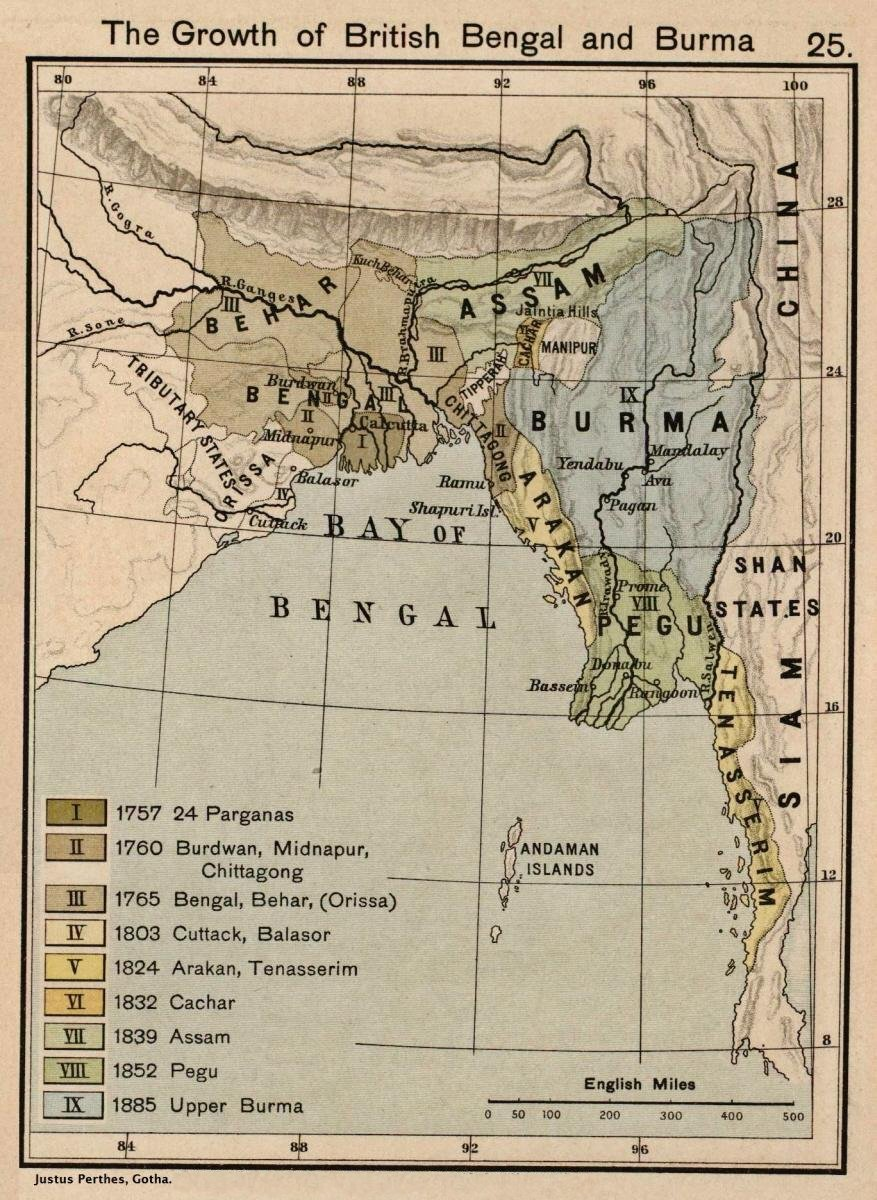
Assam annexation to British India in 1838.

The present-day state of Assam and its predecessor Undivided Assam was colonized by the East India Company and the British Raj over a period of 150 years—beginning with the Goalpara region in 1765 to drawing of the McMahon Line in 1913-1914 when the British consolidated its rule over the present-day Arunachal Pradesh.

== 1765–1824 ==
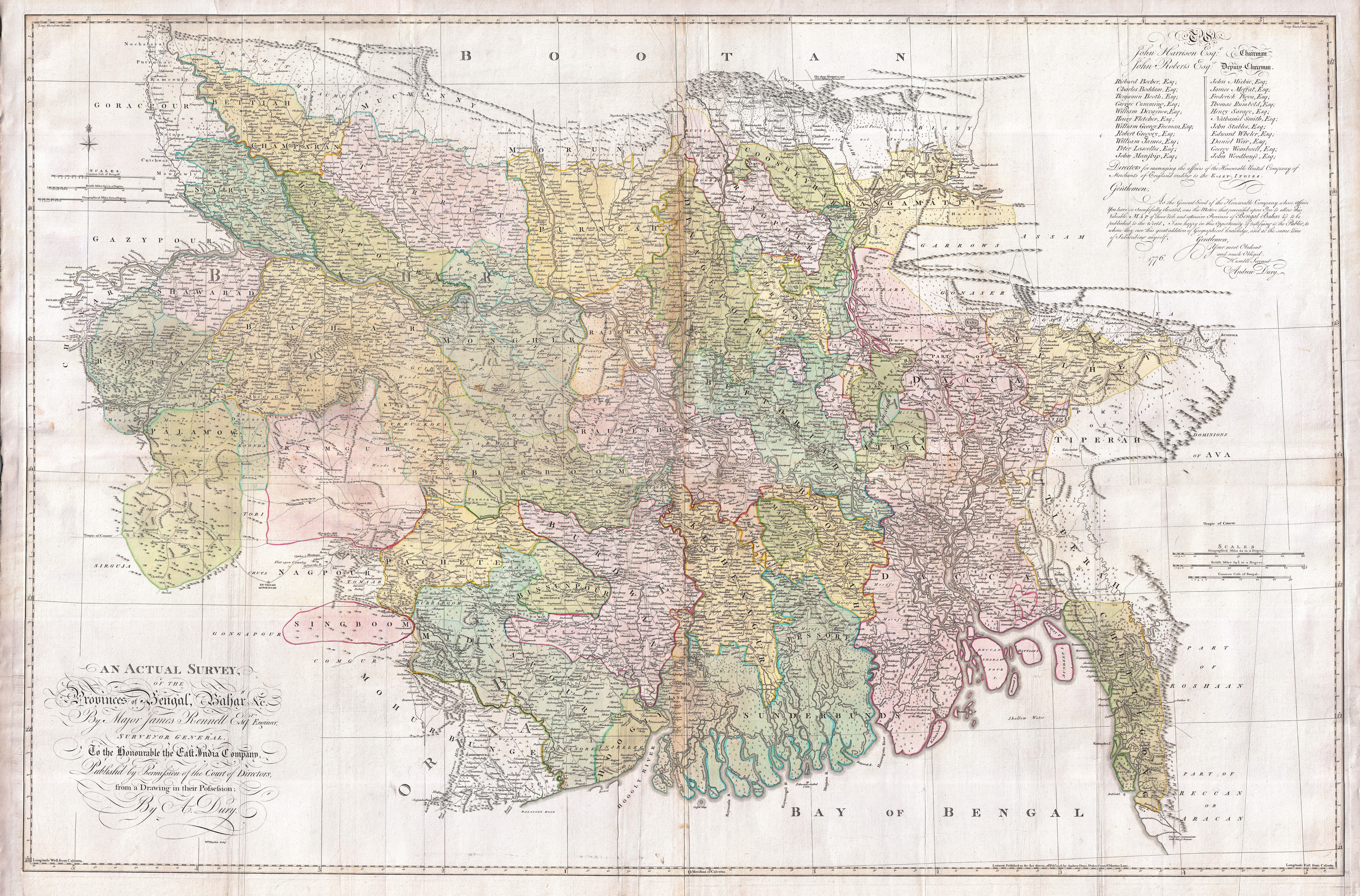
James Rennell's 1776 map shows the eastern boundary of the British controlled regions before 1824

Following the Battle of Plassey (1757), the East India Company received the Diwani of Bengal in 1765 from the Mughals, and with it a major part of the Goalpara region. The northern part, called the eastern Duars were still with Bhutan.

== 1824–1838 ==
The First Anglo-Burmese War commenced in 1824, and by March 28 the British had occupied Guwahati, when the Raja of Darrang submitted themselves to the British, who made rudimentary administrative arrangements by October 1824. The Burmese occupiers retreated from the Ahom capital of Rangpur in January 1825 and the nearly the whole of Brahmaputra Valley fell into British hands. In 1828, the Kachari kingdom was annexed under the Doctrine of Lapse after the king Govinda Chandra was killed. In 1832, the Khasi king surrendered and the British increased their influence over the Jaintia ruler. In 1833, upper Assam became a British protectorate under the erstwhile ruler of the Ahom kingdom, Purandhar Singha, but in 1838 the region was formally annexed into the British empire.
