= Arup Kumar Dey =

Indian politician (born 1984)

Arup Kumar Dey (born 1984) is an Indian politician from Assam. He is a member of the Assam Legislative Assembly from the Bijni Assembly constituency in Chirang district representing the Bharatiya Janata Party.

== Early life and education ==
Dey is from Kokrajhar, Chirang district, Assam. He is the son of the late Kalipada Dey. He completed his BA at Kokrajhar Government College, Kokrajhar which is affiliated with Gauhati University, Assam, Gauhati in 2005. He is a businessman and his wife is in government service. He declared assets worth Rs.8 crore in his affidavit with the Election Commission of India.

== Career ==
Dey won the Bijni Assembly constituency representing the Bharatiya Janata Party in the 2026 Assam Legislative Assembly election. He polled 71,708 and defeated his nearest rival, Kamal Singh Narzary of the United People's Party Liberal, by a margin of 33,927 votes.
