= Baokhungri Festival =

Annual cultural and adventure sports festival in Bodoland, Assam

- Status: Active
- Begins: 12 April
- Ends: 14 April
- Frequency: Annually
- Locations: Foothills of Baokhungri Hill, Harinaguri, Kokrajhar, Bodoland
- Country: India
- Inaugurated: 2013
- Most recent: 2026
- Organiser: Bodoland Tourism Department

Baokhungri Festival is a three-day event celebrating culture, adventure sports, and spirituality at the foothills of sacred Baokhungri Hill and in the summits near Harinaguri, Kokrajhar district, Bodoland. It is organized mainly by the Tourism Dept of the Bodoland Territorial Council (BTC), with cooperation from the Departments of Sports & Youth Welfare and Cultural Affairs. It is the biggest festival in the Bodoland Territorial Region (BTR).

The festival takes place each year in the middle of April, finishing up on the day of Sankranti, or the final day of the Chaitra month of the Hindu calendar. It signifies the beginning of Rongjali Bwisagu, the Bodo New Year, and provides a stage for promoting indigenous practices, harmony among the community, and ecotourism in the Northeast of India.

== Etymology and mythology ==
Baokhungri Hill, a peak located around 6 to 10 km (3.7 to 6.2 mi) northeast of Kokrajhar town, close to the edge of the Chakrashila Wildlife Sanctuary, is the source of the festival's name. Indigenous Bodo mythology claims that a terrible historical legend is the source of the term Baokhungri. According to local legend, Deeplai, a Bodo princess, was informed that her beloved had died in combat. She climbed the hill and gave her life at the top because she was so distraught. The phrase Baokhungri roughly translates to "the princess who offered or sacrificed herself" in Bodo.

In parallel spiritual traditions, the hill is widely revered by the Bodo community as the sacred dwelling place of Sibrai (identified with Lord Shiva) and Bwrai Bathou, alongside other local guardian deities of the Bathouism faith.

== History ==
The ceremonial ascent of Baokhungri Hill, known as Baokhungri Hajw Gakhwnai, has been observed by the Boro people for generations on the day of Sankranti as an unofficial, regional custom. To offer prayers for the coming year, devotees would ascend to the summit.

The Bodoland Territorial Council organized the event into a structured annual festival to protect these indigenous customs and increase tourism in the area. In the early 2010s, the first official edition was released. The festival's scope has expanded dramatically; its 13th edition, which took place from 12–14 April 2026, attracted thousands of tourists from both local and foreign countries, including neighboring Bhutan.

== Key rituals and events ==
=== The Sacred Hill Trek (Hajw Gakhwnai) ===
The core spiritual event takes place on the third and final day (14 April, the day of Sankranti). A mass climb up the rocky terrain of Baokhungri Hill is undertaken by thousands of pilgrims, devotees, and visitors. It is said that reaching the summit on this day will purify mental and physical barriers and bring prosperity, health, and good fortune for the approaching New Year. A deep-rooted local belief dictates that anyone who successfully completes the trek for three consecutive years on Sankranti will be blessed with long-term happiness and marital harmony.

=== Indigenous sports and competitions ===
Traditional Bodo sports, which are rarely found in popular sports formats, are preserved in large part because to the festival. Important athletic events consist of:

- Khomlainai: A traditional Bodo wrestling style that assesses both tactical grappling and physical stamina. With large cash rewards, it attracts contestants from all over the state, both male and female.
- Ghila Gelenai: An indigenous game made using the big seeds of the climber plant Ghila (Entada gigas).
- Dongfang Bukhunai: A traditional sport that revolves around tree-shifting or log-pulling competitions.
- Daobo Athing: A race on bamboo stilts that calls for exceptional speed and balance.

Modern adventure sports including cross-country cycling, half-marathons, paragliding, and hot air ballooning have been incorporated into the BTC's schedule in recent years.

=== Cultural showcases ===
A large amphitheater on the festival grounds is used for multi-community cultural performances. The main attraction is the Bwisagu Maginai, also known as the Bwisagu Dance Competition, when groups perform in time with traditional Bodo musical instruments:

- Kham: A traditional Bodo drum that is quite long.
- Sifhung: A long bamboo flute with five holes, central to Bodo folk music.
- Jotha: Rhythmic small bronze cymbals.
- Thorkha: A tempo-maintaining split bamboo clapper.

The famous Bagurumba (the butterfly dance) and the Bardwi-sikhla dance are two other well-known dances that are performed.

== Culinary and handicrafts exhibition ==
An essential component of the festival is the promotion of Bodoland's material culture. Food stalls serve authentic Bodo delicacies, most notably:

- Gwkha Gwkhwi: A Bodo traditional bitter-and-sour dish. It is primarily made from over 100 wild herbs, indigenous greens, and sometimes pork or chicken.
- Onla: A rice powder-based curry flavored with native spices and chicken or pork.
- Zumai: Traditional home-brewed rice beer used during festive hospitality.

The festival also features large commercial expos showcasing Bodo handloom textiles, specialized Dokhona weaves, cane and bamboo furniture, and indigenous clay pottery.

== See also ==
- Baokhungri Hajw Gakhwnai
- Bwisagu
- Bodo people
- Bodoland Territorial Region
- Chakrashila Wildlife Sanctuary
- Dwijing Festival
