= Bengtol =

- Nickname: BengtolBazar
- Location in Assam, India Bengtol (India)
- Coordinates: 26°38′17″N 90°28′34″E
- Country: India
- State: Assam

Languages
  - Official: Boro/Assamese
- Time zone: UTC+5:30 (IST)
- Postal code: 783394
- ISO 3166 code: IN-AS-26

Bengtol is a town in Chirang District in the Indian state of Assam. It is governed by Bengtol Gram Panchayat. The nearest city is Bongaigaon, about 25 kilometers away.

== Demographics ==
Bengtol Town or Bengtol Bazaar Town had a 2011 population of 543 of which 276 are males while 267 are females. Children age 0-6 number 77 or 14.18% of the total. Average Sex Ratio is 967, higher than other town average of 958. Child Sex Ratio 711, lower than Assam average of 962 Bengtol has a lower literacy rate compared to other towns. In 2011, the literacy rate was 69.31% compared to 72.19% of Assam. Male literacy stood at 77.92% while female literacy rate was 60.85%. Boro and Assamese are the main languages. Bengali, Nepali and Hindi are also common.

== Education ==
- Bengtol College, Bengtol
- Don Bosco Higher Secondary School
- Centre for New Learning, Bengtol
- Bengtol Higher Secondary School
- Bengtol Senior Secondary School
- Mwnsin Sibrai English School, Bengtol

== Geography ==
Patabari, Kajalgaon, and Bongaigaon are nearby towns. Aie River flows near the town.
