= Adarsha =

Adarsha or Adarshya may refer to:

- Adarsha Vidya Mandir, one of the largest secondary schools in Lalitpur, Nepal
- Adarsha Vidyalaya, school in Sahakar Nagar, Shell Colony, Chembur, Mumbai, India
- Mahendra Adarsha, town and Village Development Committee in Bara District in the Narayani Zone of south-eastern Nepal
- Paropakar Adarsha Uccha Madhyamik Vidhalaya, school, Gorkha District, Nepal
- Matuail Adarsha High School, school in Matuail, Bangladesh
- Patiya Adarsha High School, one of the oldest schools of Bangladesh

== See also ==
- Adarsh, a given name and surname
- Adarsh Nagar (disambiguation)
- Adarsh Gram Yojana (disambiguation)
