= Ajoy Kumar Ray =

Indian politician

Ajoy Kumar Ray (born 1987) is an Indian politician from Assam. He is a member of the Assam Legislative Assembly from Bijni Assembly constituency in Chirang district. He won the 2021 Assam Legislative Assembly election, representing the Bharatiya Janata Party.

== Early life and education ==
Ray is from Fulkumari village, Chirang District, Assam. He is the son of Harmohan Ray. He married Chumki Saha. He completed his B.A. in 2012 at a college affiliated with Gauhati University.

== Career ==
Ray won from Bijni Assembly constituency representing the Bharatiya Janata Party in the 2021 Assam Legislative Assembly election. He polled 45,733 votes and defeated his nearest rival, Kamal Singh Narzary of the Bodoland People's Front, by a margin of 1,003 votes. In the 2016 Assam Legislative Assembly election, he had contested the Bijni seat on a Bharatiya Gana Parishad ticket, but lost to Narzary, by a margin of 1,678 votes. He later, joined the BJP and won the 2021 election.
