= Baukungri Hajw Gakhwnai =

The "Baukungri Hajw Gakhwnai" also known as the "Trekking of Baukungri Hill" is an annual traditional spiritual and adventurous event held at Baokhungri Hill, near Harinaguri in the Kokrajhar district of the Bodoland Territorial Council ( BTC), Assam. It is held annually on the auspicious occasion of Chaitra Sankranti the final day of the Chaitra month, occurring in mid-April and signaling the beginning of Rongjali Bwisagu (the Bodo New Year).

In recent years, the Tourism Department of the BTC has transformed this traditional custom into a large-scale three-day organized event called the Baokhungri Festival. Though the central spiritual attraction continues to be the mass hill trek, the festival has expanded to include an ethnic food festival, cultural performances, and a range of traditional and contemporary adventure sports aimed at promoting ecotourism in Bodoland (BTR).

== History ==
Celebrated on a day before Bwisagu by the Bodo people the tourism department of BTC has taken up to celebrate the traditional customs as annual festival since the last five years in a grand way, by introducing various programmes and adventurous sports to attract tourists from outside or in other words through systematic and organised way.

Though it was celebrated by the Bodos in a traditional way in earlier times, in present times, thousands of people, irrespective of caste, creed and religions, throng and climb the Baukungri peak with festivity mood for welcoming the Bwisagu festival.

== Events ==
The events typically include trekking of the Baukungri Hill, an ethnic food festival, a cultural show, and adventurous and indigenous sports.

== Tourists ==
International tourists from neighbouring countries and western countries can be seen participating in the event.
