= Ultimate flying disc sport in India =

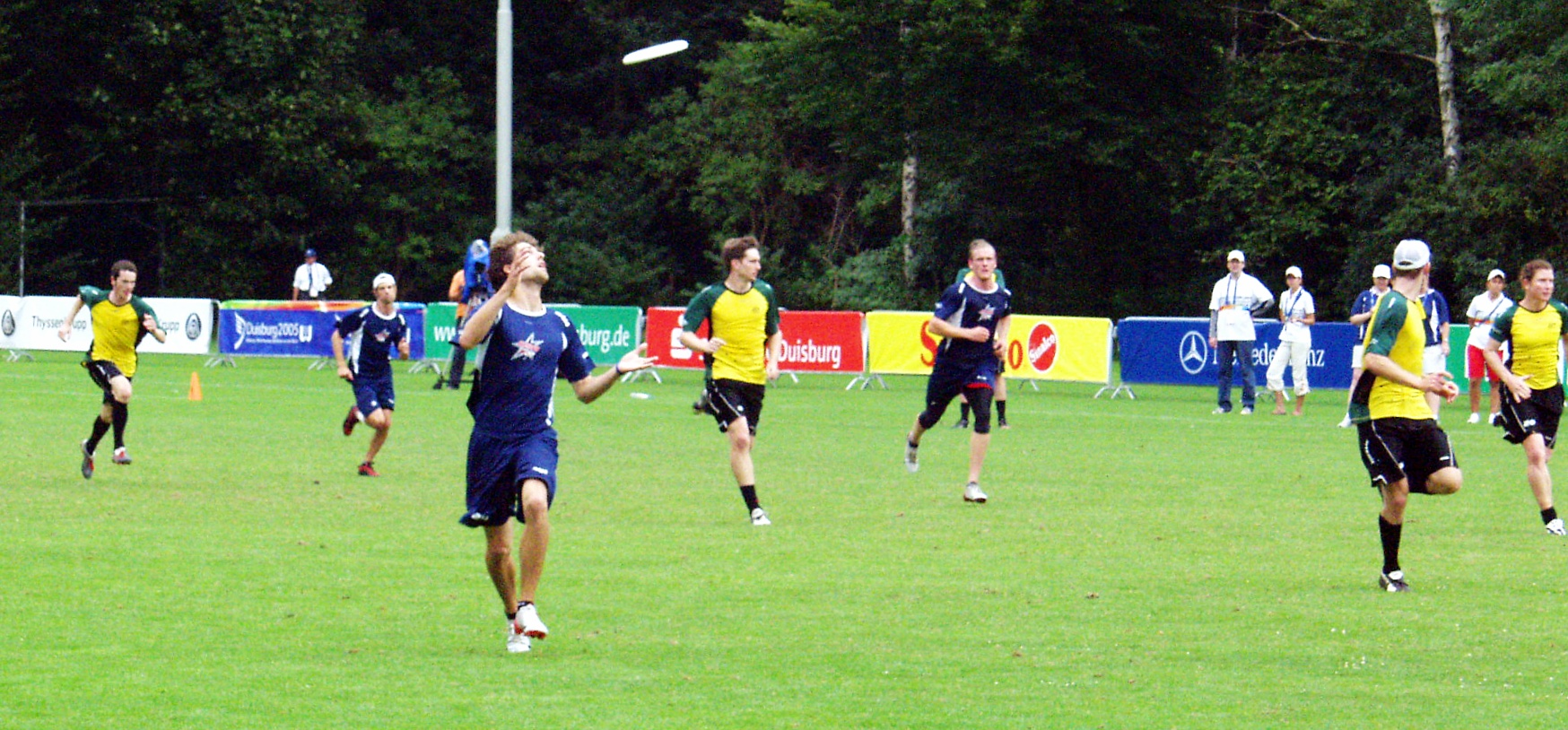
- Country: India
- Governing body: Ultimate Players Association of India
- National team: [[India national Ultimate team|India]]

Ultimate flying disc is an emerging sport in India, which is developing a culture of its own, different from the US Ultimate culture. The sport is being used as a tool to build social harmony in North-east India. Chirang in Assam is a hotspot of the sport.

In June 2025 Indian National Ultimate Frisbee mixed team won silver at the Asian Oceanic Ultimate Beach Championships (AOUBC) held at Shirahama, Japan.

== National tournaments ==
- 2018, Gujarat
- 2020, Karnataka
- 2022-2023 Championship Series Mixed National Tournament, Surat, Gujrat
- 2023 Bharat Trophy, Hyderabad
- 2024 National Championships, Surat
- 2025 National Open and Women's Championship, Bangalore
