= Dwijing Festival =

Annual river festival in Bodoland, Assam

- Status: Inactive
- Begins: December 27
- Ends: January 7
- Frequency: Annually
- Locations: Aie River, Chirang district, Assam
- Country: India
- Inaugurated: 2016–17
- Most recent: 2019–20
- Organiser: Assam Tourism Department, Assam Tourism Development Corporation, Bodoland Tourism

The Dwijing Festival, also known as the Aie River Festival, is an annual river festival held on the banks of the Aie river near the Hagrama bridge in Chirang district, Bodoland in the Indian state of Assam. The festival takes place over a period of 12 days from December 27 to January 7 every year.

== Etymology ==
The name Dwijing derives from the Bodo language (dwi - water, jing - riverbank), spoken locally. The festival is celebrated on the banks of the Aie river, which translates to 'mother' in Bodo. The river has a significant impact on the lives of the locals.

== History ==
The festival, a joint project of the Assam Tourism Department, Assam Tourism Development Corporation and Bodoland Tourism, was launched in 2016 with the objective of promoting local river tourism and highlighting the culture and customs of the Bodoland Territorial Region. The fourth and most recent edition of the festival was organized from 27 December 2019 to 7 January 2020.

== The festival ==
The festival is primarily associated with the culture of the Bodo ethnic group.

It is usually held near the Hagrama bridge, the longest rural river bridge in Assam. It features ethnic trade, culture, cuisine, tradition, games and sports, adventure activities, river rafting, helicopter rides and cultural extravaganzas, among others. It also emphasizes on underlining the beauty and cultural richness of the Bodoland Territorial Region. Multiple Bollywood celebrities have performed at the festival. The festival further aims to generate employment opportunities, provide livelihood to the locals and ameliorate economic conditions.

== See also ==
- Baokhungri Festival
- List of festivals in India
