= Bijni College =

College in Assam

- Motto: Learn, shine and live
- Type: Bachelor of Arts Bachelor of Science
- Established: 1969
- Affiliations: Bodoland University
- Principal: Dr. Birhash Giri Basumatary
- Location: Bijni, Chirang district, Assam, India
- Website: bijnicollege.ac.in

Bijni College is an undergraduate college is situated on the Indo-Bhutan border, Bijni. The college is established in the year 1969 at Bijni of Chirang district in Assam. The college is affiliated to Bodoland University.

== Departments ==
=== Arts ===
- Department of Assamese
- Department of Bengali Language
- Department of Bodo
- Department of English
- Department of Education
- Department of Economics
- Department of History
- Department of Political Science
- Department of Philosophy

=== Science ===
- Department of Botany
- Department of Chemistry
- Department of Mathematics
- Department of Physics
- Department of Zoology

== Accreditation ==
In 2017 the college has been awarded 'B+' grade by National Assessment and Accreditation Council. The college is also recognised by University Grants Commission (India).
