= Basugaon =

- Town
- Location in Assam, India Basugaon (India)
- Coordinates: 26.47°N 90.4°E
- Country: India
- State: Assam
- District: Chirang

Government
  - Body: Basugaon Municipal Board
- Elevation: 47 m (154 ft)

Population (2019)
  - Total: 27,350

Languages
  - Official: English, Assamese
- Time zone: UTC+5:30 (IST)
- PIN: 783372
- Vehicle registration: AS-26 (Chirang) AS-19 (Bongaigaon)

Basugaon (IPA:ˈbɑːsʊˌgɑ̃ʊ) is a neighbourhood of Bongaigaon UA and it falls under the Chirang District of Assam, India. It is situated approximately 180 km from Guwahati City in the western part of the Lower Assam Region. The name of this town is derived from its high bamboo plantation and bamboo market. Basically "basu" or "bash" means bamboo and "gaon" means village. That is Basugaon, 'The village of bamboo'.

== Popular temples ==
- Raja Thakur Mandir
- Sri Basudev Gauriya Math, Basugaon
- Kali Bari, chalk bazar
- Govinda Bari
- Ram Krishna Ashram
- Shiv Bari
- Pagla Bastav, Bijoygaon
- Basugaon Shasan Kali Mandir
- Durga Bari
- Satsang Kendra, Basugaon, Rajacharang
- Basugaon Bhutiapara Shive Mandir, Basugaon
- Khatal Para Shri Shri Kali mandir

== Transport ==
=== Rail ===
Basugaon falls under the Northeast Frontier Railway zone of the Indian Railways. There are two stations in Chirang District – Basugaon and Bijni. Basugaon Station is the nearest station for New Bongaigaon Jn. is considered to be the Adarsh Station of India (a railway flyover is under construction).

=== Roadways ===
National Highway 31 connects Basugaon with the states Bihar, Jharkhand and West Bengal. National Highway 37 from Goalpara in Assam to Dimapur in Nagaland traverses the entire length of Assam and connects Basugaon with almost all the major cities of Assam including the cities of Jorhat and Dibrugarh. National Highway 31C connects Basugaon to Guwahati and National Highway 37 also connects Basugaon with Guwahati.

- Basugaon-Kashikotra Road (Towards NH-)
- Basugaon-Kokrajhar Road (via Salakati)
- Basugaon-Bongaigaon Road (via Dangtol)
- Basugaon-Talguri Road (Towards NH-)

== Demographics ==
Religion in Basugaon
Religion	Percent
Hinduism	87.50%
Islam	10.07%
Christianity	2.00%
Others	0.88%

Ethnic Groups in Basugaon
Language	Percent
Assamese	40.47%
Bengali	43.83%
Others	15.70%

== Localities in Basugaon ==
- Subhas Nagar
- Chok Bazar
- Goglapara
- Bhutiapara residential area
- Ram Krishna Ashram Road
- Garu Bazar
- Nichinapara
- Nehalgaon
- Sishumangal
- Ranchaidam
- Bijoygaon
- Basugaon main road
- Basuagon Railway station road
- Basugaon town committee road
- Basugaon college road
- Vivekananda pally
- Basugaon Chariali
- Rajacharang
- East Khatal Para
- West Khatal Para
