= Diyungbra =

- Sub Division
- Location in Assam, India
- Coordinates: 25.74°N 92.915°E
- Country: India
- State: Assam
- District: Dima Hasao

Government
  - Type: Diyungbra Sub-Division

Area
  - Total: 15 km^{2} (5.8 sq mi)

Population (2011)
  - Total: 18,352
  - Density: 1,200/km^{2} (3,200/sq mi)

Languages
  - Official: Dimasa
- Time zone: UTC-5:30 (IST)
- PIN: 782448
- Telephone code: +91
- Vehicle registration: AS-08-X XXXX

Diyungbra (IPA: Di-yung-bra [Diyung means Big river and bra means branch], etymological, River mouth of Diyung; place where river Diyung and Kopili meets) is a newly created Sub-Division and an ITD Block in Dima Hasao district in the Indian state of Assam. Diyungbra is also one of the three sub-divisions of Dima Hasao District.

== Geography ==
Diyungbra is situated at bank of river Diyung and Kopili. The river Diyung that originates in Dima Hasao district joins river Kopili at Diyungbra. It is also called Diyungmukh or River mouth of Diyung by non-native speakers.

== Literacy ==
In Diyungbra block, the literacy rate stands at 53%, with 9,803 out of a total population of 18,352 being educated. Among males, the literacy rate is 60%, with 5,651 out of 9,415 males being literate, while among females, it is 46%, with 4,152 out of 8,937 females being literate. However, the downside is that the illiteracy rate in Diyungbra block is 46%, with 8,549 out of 18,352 individuals being illiterate. The male illiteracy rate is 39%, with 3,764 out of 9,415 males being illiterate, whereas among females, the illiteracy rate is 53%, with 4,785 out of 8,937 females being illiterate.

== See also ==
- List of subdivisions of Assam
