= Adarsh Nagar (disambiguation) =

Adarsh Nagar may refer to the following places in India:

== Andhra Pradesh ==
- Adarsh Nagar, a neighborhood in Visakhapatnam, Andhra Pradesh, India

== Delhi ==
- Adarsh Nagar, Delhi Assembly constituency, Delhi, India
- Adarsh Nagar metro station, Delhi, India
- Adarsh Nagar railway station, part of Delhi Suburban Railway, India

== Other places ==
- Adarsh Nagar, Rajasthan Assembly constituency, Jaipur, Rajasthan, India
- Adarshnagar railway station, Jaipur, Rajasthan, India
- Adarsh Nagar (Mumbai) metro station, Mumbai, Maharashtra, India

== See also ==
- Adarsha (disambiguation)
- Nagar (disambiguation)
