= Adarsh =

Indian male name

- Gender: Male
- Language: Sanskrit

Origin
- Origin: India
- Meaning: An ideal
- Region of origin: India

Other names
- Alternative spelling: Aadarsh
- Nickname: Aa

Adarsh (Devanagari: आदर्श ādarś) is an Indian male name that denotes "an ideal".

== Notable people ==
- Taran Adarsh, Indian film critic, journalist, editor and film trade analyst, the son of B. K. Adarsh
- Adarsh Balakrishna, Indian film actor
- Adarsh Kumar Goel, a former judge of the Supreme Court of India
- Adarsh Rathore, Indian journalist, musician and folk singer
- Adarsh Sein Anand, the 29th Chief Justice of India
- Adarsh Shastri, leader of the Aam Aadmi Party
- Adarsh Shinde (born 1988), playback singer
- Adarsh Rai, a musical artist
- Adarsh gourav, an indian film actor

== See also ==
- Adarsha (disambiguation)
