= Kalamati =

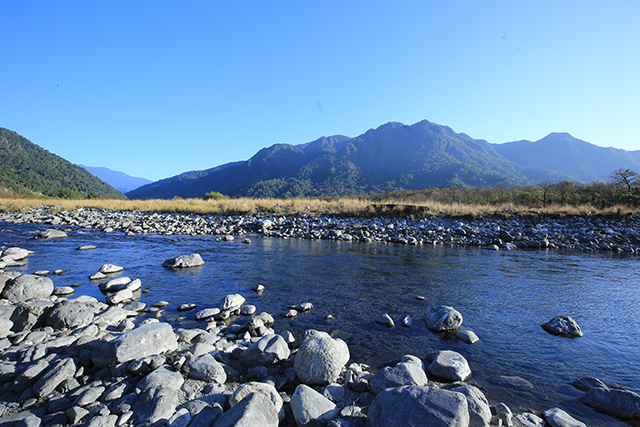
- Country: India
- State: Assam

Area
  - Total: 350 km^{2} (140 sq mi)
- Demonym: Boro/Nepali/Assamese

Languages
  - Official: Boro/Assamese
- Time zone: UTC+5:30 (IST)
- Postal code: 783393
- ISO 3166 code: IN-AS-26
- Website: chirang.assam.gov.in/tourist-place-detail/271

Kalamati is a popular picnic spot located north of Chirang district, Bodoland Territorial Region, Assam, India, and shares a border with Bhutan.

== History ==
Kala; Assamese:[ˈɔxɔm] meaning ‘color black’ and Mati meaning soil is black. Kalamati is situated on the banks of a stream.

Etymology-

Maoria Hajw (बर'/बड़ो [bɔɽo]) is known for orchids. Maoria means ‘orphan’ and Hajw means ‘hill’. There are no other hills near Maoria Hajw.

Hajw Agor literally translates to "the hills with design."During the day, it 'displays seven colors' - red, white, black, yellow, green, navy blue, and sky blue

Mwider Khor, is the elephant trapping area.The forest elephants would enter the boundary and normally get adjusted with the domestic elephants and wild elephants along with their domestic ones.

== Geography ==
Kalamati is located among the foothills of North East Indian Himalaya, south of Bhutan and north of chirang.It is one of the famous tourist destinations in Chirang District , BTR.with parts of existing districts of Kokrajhar, Bongaigaon and Barpeta.

== Flora and fauna ==
An array of flora & fauna dominates the area, with each region having specific feature. It is a hub for medicinal plants, many edible wild fruits and herbs.Golden Langur here relishes a variety of orchid and find wild dog, rhesus macaque, spotted deer, civets, leopard, porcupine, wild boar, giant squirrel, flying squirrel, and pangolin.

== The forest task protection force ==
About 2 km from the main Koilamoila market is the Forest Protection Task Force camp maintained by New Horizon, a community-based conservation NGO.

The Forest Protection Task Force is an initiative of the BTAD government to keep vigil of the forest resources in its four districts i.e. Chirang, Kokrajhar, Baksa and Udalguri.

== Eco-tourism prospect ==
Kalamati is a prospective tourist's site and there is scope for the development of Eco-tourism as an alternative livelihood for the communities. There are several trekking routes in the area, and can be entered passing via aesthetically serene surroundings. Just 3 km from Kalamati is Golthek point, the orange collection point, which is a potential tourist spot.

About 15-20 Bhutanese families camp at during the winter months for collection of oranges from the forest.

== Gallery ==
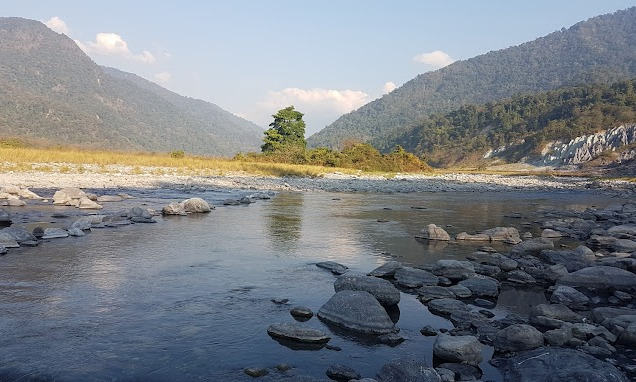
Front view kalamati

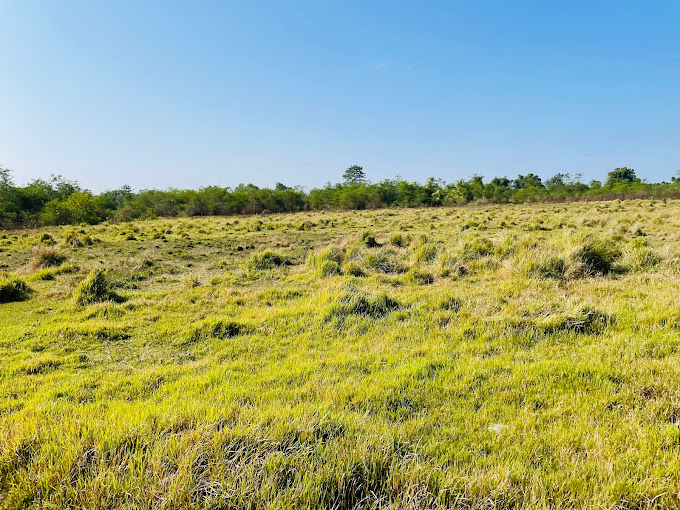
Green grass... Stream
