= Bijni Assembly constituency =

Constituency of the Assam legislative assembly in India

Bijni
- Constituency No. 20 for the Assam Legislative Assembly
- 20-Bijni within Chirang district

Constituency details
- Country: India
- Region: Northeast India
- State: Assam
- Division: Lower Assam
- District: Chirang
- Lok Sabha constituency: Kokrajhar
- Established: 1951
- Total electors: 185,551
- Reservation: None

Member of Legislative Assembly
- 16th Assam Legislative Assembly
- Incumbent Arup Kumar Dey
- Party: BJP
- Alliance: NDA
- Elected year: 2026
- Preceded by: Ajoy Kumar Ray (BJP)

Bijni State assembly constituency is one of the 126 state legislative assembly constituencies in Assam, India. It is one of the nine assembly segments that constitute the Kokrajhar Lok Sabha constituency. Since 2026, it has been represented by Arup Kumar Dey of the Bharatiya Janata Party.

Established in 1951, the constituency was redrawn during the 2023 delimitation exercise. The reconstituted constituency now includes Bijni town, and many other rural areas of the Chirang district.

Most Successful parties from Bijni Assembly Constituency Since 1952
1. IND (5 times) (33.3%)
2. INC (3 times) (20.0%)
3. BJP (2 times) (13.3%)
4. BPF (2 times) (13.3%)
5. PTCA (1 time) (6.67%)
6. JP (1 time) (6.67%)
7. PSP (1 time) (6.67%)

== Local self-governed segments ==
Bijni Assembly constituency is composed of the following local self-governed segments:

- Bijni Municipal Board
- Boro Bazar Development Block
- Manikpur Development Block
  - Bhangnamari Village Council Development Committee
  - Bijnigaon Village Council Development Committee
  - Chatianguri Village Council Development Committee
  - Dangaigaon Village Council Development Committee
  - Gargaon Bhalatol Village Council Development Committee
  - Monakocha Village Council Development Committee
  - Malipara Village Council Development Committee
  - Mongolian Village Council Development Committee
  - Poshlabari Gargaon Village Council Development Committee
  - Dewanpara Village Council Development Committee
  - Alukhunda Village Council Development Committee

== Members of the Legislative Assembly ==
Election	Member	Political Party	Tenure
2026	Arup Kumar Dey	Bharatiya Janata Party	Incumbent
2021	Ajoy Kumar Ray	Bharatiya Janata Party	2021-26
2016	Kamal Singh Narzary	Bodoland People's Front	2006-21
2011	Kamal Singh Narzary	Bodoland People's Front	2006-21
2006	Kamal Singh Narzary	Independent	2006-21
2001	Romio Brahma	Independent	2001-06
1996	Rohini Basumatary	Independent	1996-01
1991	Kamal Brahma	Independent	1991-96
1985	Ganesh Bora	Plain Tribals Council of Assam	1985-91
1983	Padmalochan Boro	Independent	1983-85
1978	Lakhyadhar Choudhury	Janata Party	1978-83
1972	Golak Chandra Patgiri	Indian National Congress	1967-78
1967	Golak Chandra Patgiri	Indian National Congress	1967-78
1962	Ram Prasad Das	Praja Socialist Party	1962-67
1952	Swami Krishnananda Brahmachari	Indian National Congress	1951-62

== Election results ==
=== 2026 ===
2026 Assam Legislative Assembly election: Bijni
Party	Candidate	Votes	%	±%
BJP	Arup Kumar Dey	71,708	43.44	▲10.75
UPPL	Kamal Singh Narzary	37,781	22.89	▼2.54
Independent	Khalilur Rahman	26,758	16.21	New entry
INC	Rajat Kanti Saha	9,456	5.73	New entry
Independent	Dimbeswar Boro	6,338	3.84	New entry
AIUDF	Musukha Basumatary	2,987	1.81	New entry
Independent	Nashir Uddin Khan	2,780	1.68	New entry
NOTA	None of the above	2,150	1.30	▲0.31
Margin of victory		33,927	20.55	▲19.83
Turnout		1,65,075	88.96	▲3.06
BJP hold		Swing		

=== 2021 ===
2021 Assam Legislative Assembly election: Bijni
Party	Candidate	Votes	%	±%
BJP	Ajoy Kumar Ray	45,733	32.69	New entry
BPF	Kamal Singh Narzary	44,730	31.97	▲7.48
UPPL	Phanin Boro	35,582	25.43	New entry
AJP	Rupam Kumar Das	9,951	7.11	New entry
NOTA	None of the above	1,388	0.99	▼0.10
Margin of victory		1,003	0.72	
Turnout		138,527	85.90	▼3.15
BJP gain from BPF		Swing		

== See also ==
- Chirang district
- Bijni
- List of constituencies of Assam Legislative Assembly
