= Patabari =

PATABARI FV
- Village
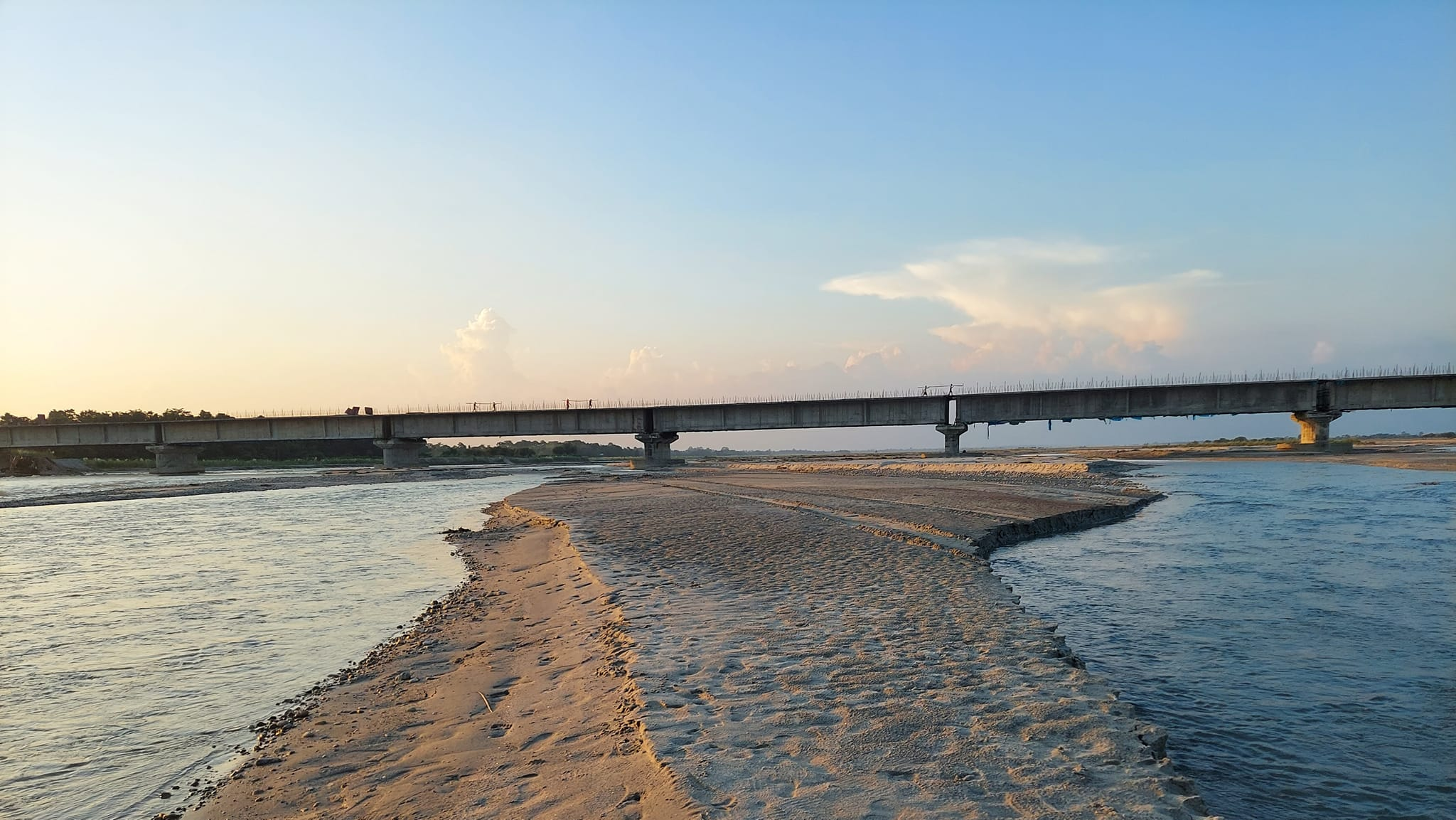
- Aie river bridge
- Nickname: Patabari Island
- Location in Assam, India PATABARI FV (India)
- Country: India
- State: Assam
- District: Chirang

Area
  - Total: 689 km^{2} (266 sq mi)

Population (As 2011 census)
  - Total: 1,148
- Demonym: Boro

Languages
  - Official: Boro
- Time zone: UTC+5:30 (IST)
- Postal code: 783394
- ISO 3166 code: IN-AS-26
- Website: Patabari.org

Patabari, commonly known as Patabari Island or Patabari Village, is located in Bengtol Subdivision, Chirang district in Assam, India. Kajalgaon and Bengtol are the district and sub-district headquarters of Patabari. The nearest city is Bongaigaon which is about 37 km away from Patabari.

== Population census ==
According to 2011 census, the number of children aged 0 to 6 in Patabari was 185, accounting for 16.11% of the total population. Patabari has a higher average sex ratio of 969 than the state average of 958. According to census data, Patabari has a child-to-female ratio of 779, which is lower than the Assam average of 962.

Patabari village has a lower literacy rate than the rest of Assam. As of 2011, the literacy rate of Patabari was 54.62%, compared to Assam's 72.19%. Male literacy in Patabari is 59.50%, while female literacy is 49.79%.

== Educational institutions ==
- Rev. Rikum Memorial English School
- Patabari High & M. E. School
- Ouguri High & ME School

== Gallery ==
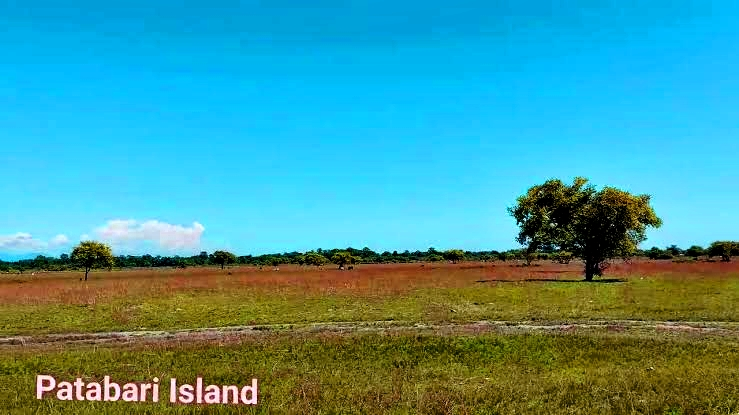

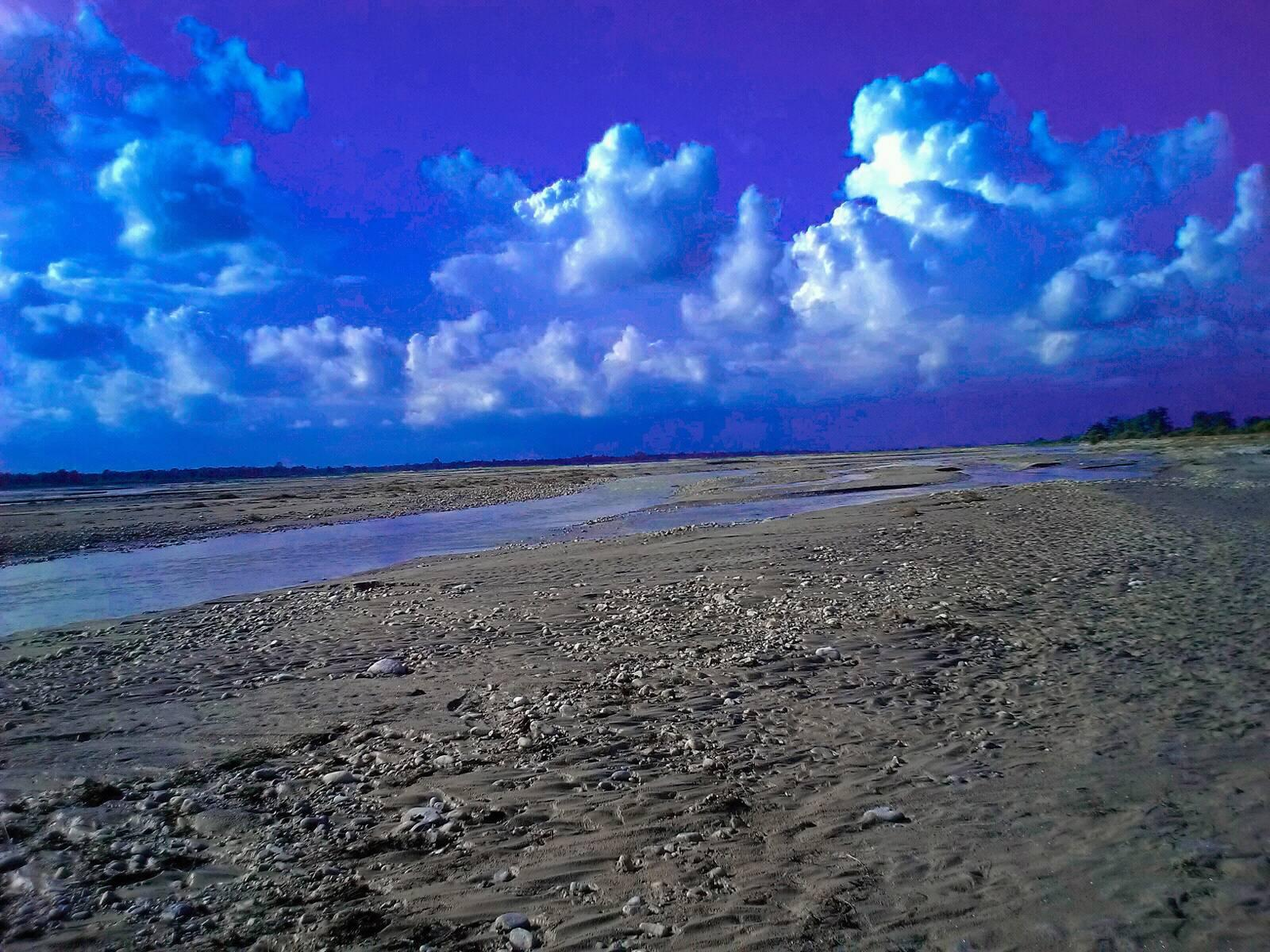

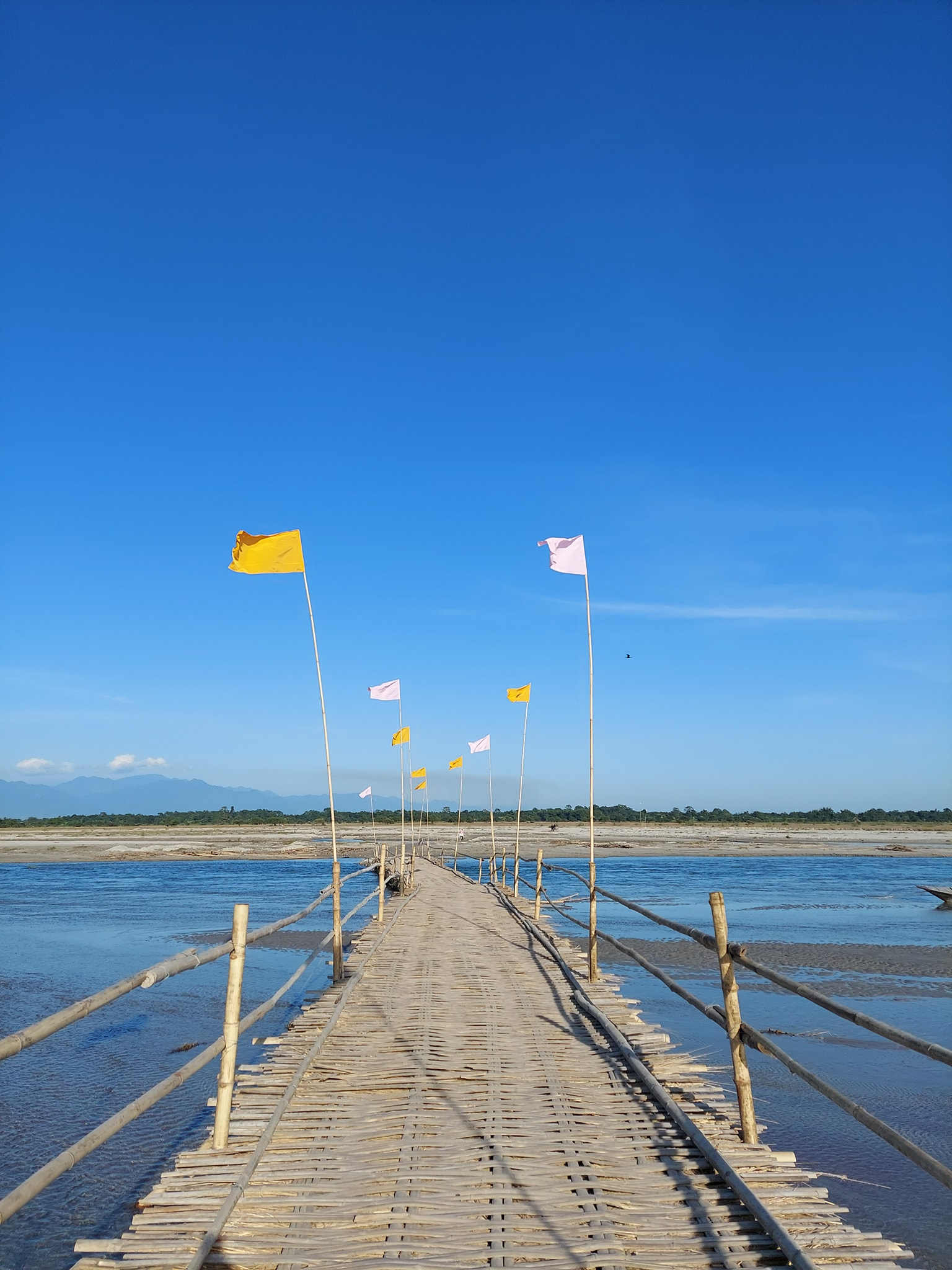

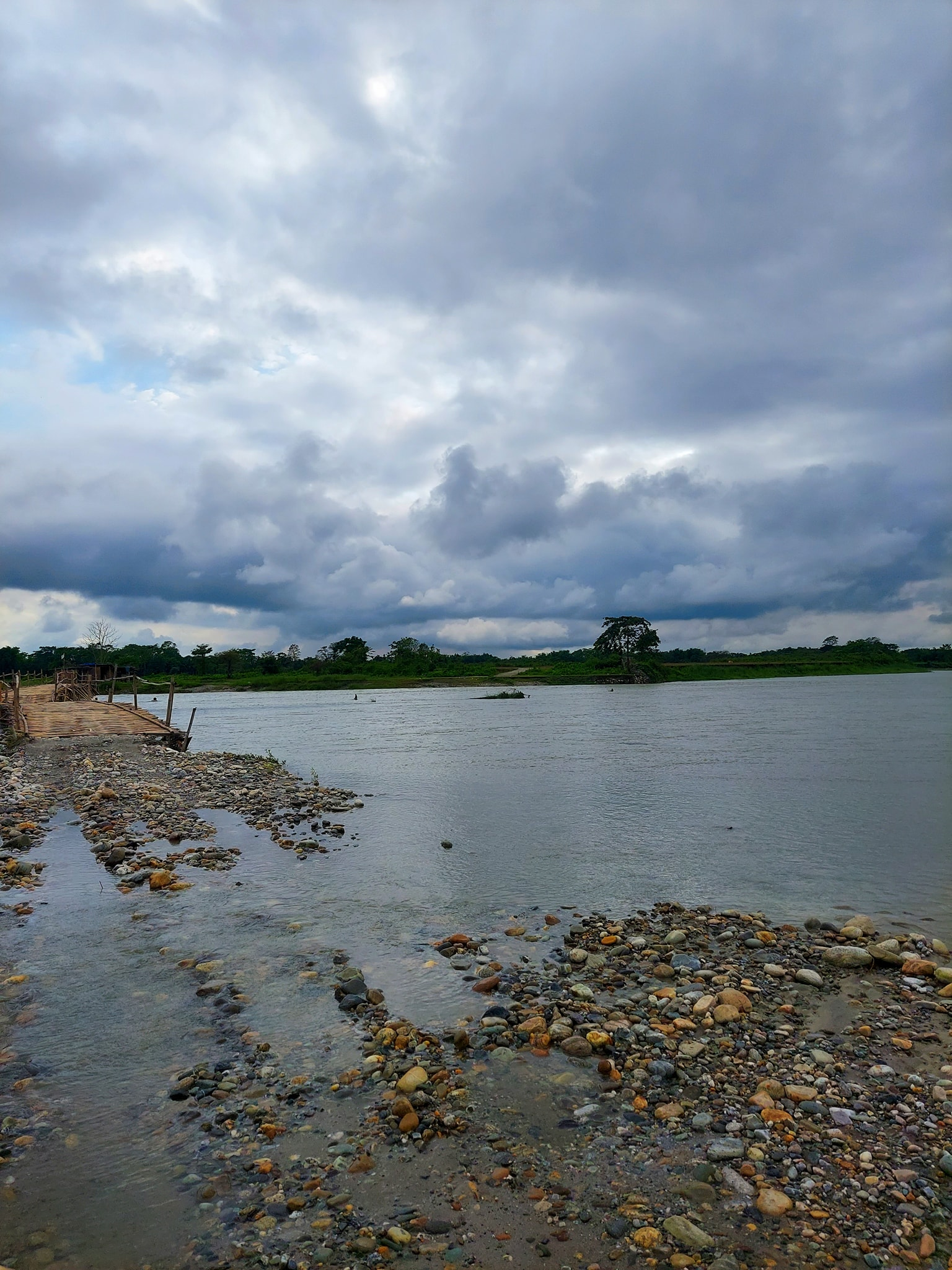
