= Bongaigaon Refinery =

Oil Refinery in Assam, India

- Interactive map of Bongaigaon Refinery
- Location: Dhaligaon, Bongaigaon, Chirang district, Assam, India; 26°30′57″N 90°31′54″E

Refinery details
- Operator: Indian Oil Corporation Limited

Bongaigaon Refinery is an oil refinery and petrochemical complex located in the town of Bongaigaon in the administrative district of Chirang in Assam, India.

== Sources ==
https://www.iocl.com/bongaigaon-refinery
