= List of subdivisions of Assam =

This is a list of administrative subdivision the state of Assam

The administrative entities that are a level below of Districts are named as Subdivisions in Assam. Since India's independence in 1947, the administrative entities of Assam have increased over a period of time. With 54 subdivisions initially, the Government of Assam incorporated 24 more subdivisions with 5 new districts on 26 January 2016, increasing the count to 78. Where the subdivisions are the administrative units, the terms, such as Tehsils or Mandals represent revenue collecting units under a district administration, and both are treated as sub–districts. Assam has 155 Tehsils, and a few fall under multiple districts, specially the districts in BTC and its surrounding. In present the total number of subdivisions are 78.

District	Headquarters	Subdivisions
Baksa	Mushalpur	Mushalpur, Salbari, Tamulpur
Bajali	Pathsala	Bajali
Barpeta	Barpeta	Barpeta, Kalgachia, Sarukhetri, Sorbhog
Biswanath	Biswanath Chariali	Biswanath Chariali, Gohpur
Bongaigaon	Bongaigaon	Bongaigaon, Manikpur, North Salmara
Cachar	Silchar ^{1}	Silchar, Lakhipur
Charaideo	Sonari	Charaideo
Chirang	Kajalgaon	Kajalgaon, Bijni
Darrang	Mangaldoi	Mangaldoi
Dhemaji	Dhemaji	Dhemaji, Jonai
Dhubri	Dhubri ^{2}	Dhubri, Bilasipara
Dibrugarh	Dibrugarh ^{3}	Dibrugarh, Moran, Naharkatiya
Dima Hasao	Haflong	Haflong, Diyungbra, Maibong
Goalpara	Goalpara ^{4}	Goalpara, Lakhipur
Golaghat	Golaghat ^{5}	Golaghat, Bokakhat, Dhansiri, Merapani
Hailakandi	Hailakandi	Hailakandi, Katlicherra
Hojai	Hojai	Hojai
Jorhat	Jorhat ^{6}	Jorhat, Titabor
Kamrup	Amingaon	Kamrup, Azara, Dakhin Kamrup, Rangia
Kamrup Metro	Guwahati ^{7A} ^{7B} ^{7C}	Guwahati, Chandrapur, Dispur, Sonapur, Azara
Karbi Anglong	Diphu	Diphu, Bokajan, Howraghat
West Karbi Anglong	Hamren	Hamren
Karimganj	Karimganj	Karimganj, Ramkrishna Nagar
Kokrajhar	Kokrajhar	Parbatjhora, Gossaigaon, Kokrajhar
Lakhimpur	North Lakhimpur	North Lakhimpur, Bihpuria Narayanpur, Dhakuakhana
Majuli	Garamur	Majuli
Morigaon	Morigaon	Morigaon
Nagaon	Nagaon ^{8}	Nagaon, Kaliabor
Nalbari	Nalbari	Nalbari, Mukalmua, Tihu
Sivasagar	Sivasagar	Sivasagar, Nazira
Sonitpur	Tezpur ^{9}	Sonitpur, Dhekiajuli
South Salmara-Mankachar	Hatsingimari	Hatsingimari
Tinsukia	Tinsukia	Tinsukia, Margherita, Sadiya
Udalguri	Udalguri	Udalguri, Bhergaon
The oldest recognised and constantly inhabited urban centres based on the earliest years of formation of the civic bodies, constituted before the Indian independence of 1947.

== Notes ==
- ^1 Formation of Silchar municipal region, 1922.
- ^2 Formation of Dhubri municipal region, 1883.
- ^3 Formation of Dibrugarh municipal region, 1873.
- ^4 Formation of Goalpara municipal region, 1875.
- ^5 Formation of Golaghat municipal region, 1920.
- ^6 Formation of Jorhat municipal region, 1909.
- ^7A Formation of Guwahati municipal region, constituted as a Town committee in 1853.
- ^7B Guwahati municipal region reconstituted under a Municipal board in 1873.
- ^7C Guwahati municipal region upgraded to a Municipal corporation in 1974.
- ^8 Formation of Nagaon municipal region, 1893.
- ^9 Formation of Tezpur municipal region, 1894.
