= Dhaligaon =

- Township
- Location in Assam, India Dhaligaon (India)
- Coordinates: 26.496866°N 90.522169°E
- Country: India
- State: Assam
- Division: Lower Assam
- District: Bongaigaon, Chirang

Languages
  - Official: Assamese, Rajbongshi
- Time zone: UTC+5:30 (IST)
- PIN: 783385
- Telephone code: 03664
- Vehicle registration: AS-26, AS-19
- Legislature type: Gaon Panchayat
- Avg. annual temperature: 26 °C (79 °F)
- Summer temperature: 38–40 °C (100–104 °F)
- Winter temperature: 28–33 °C (82–91 °F)
- Website: bongaigaon.nic.in

Dhaligaon is a Township and a neighbourhood of Bongaigaon, Chirang district, Assam, India. The refinery of Bongaigaon Refinery and Petrochemicals Limited is located in this area.
