= Bardwi Sikhla =

Boros folk dance

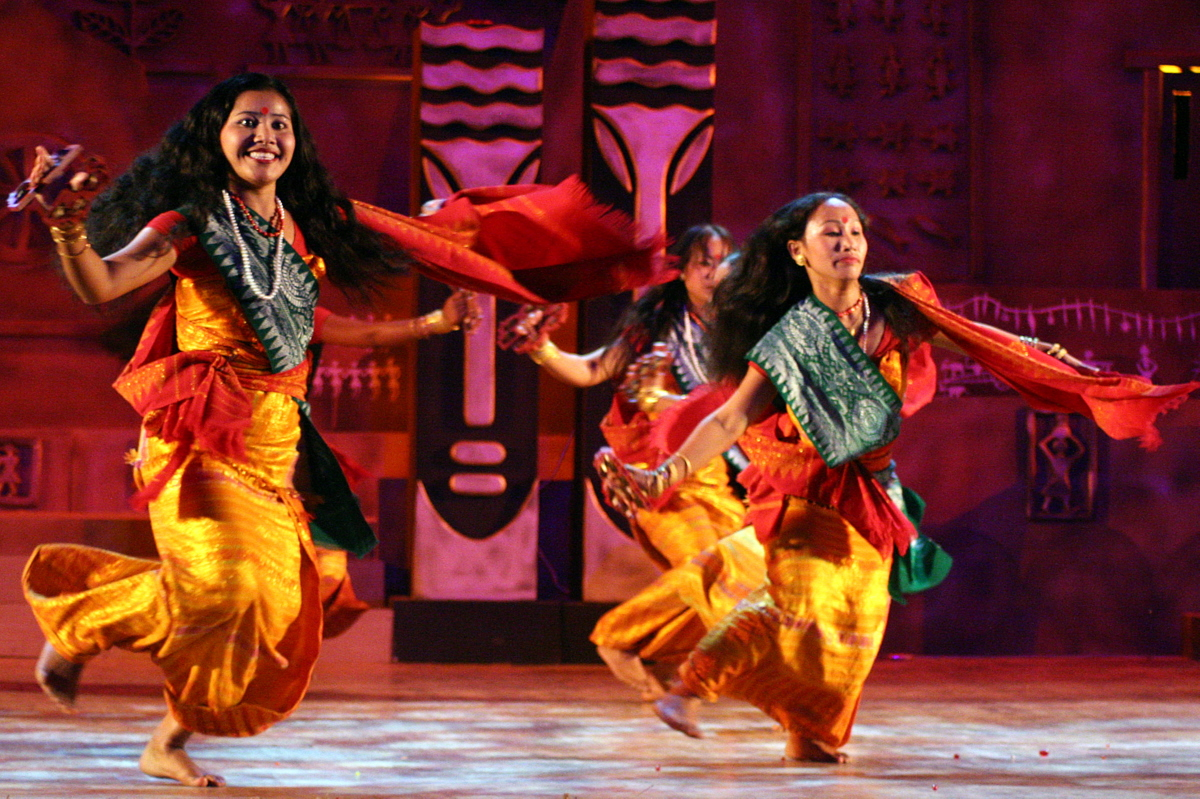
- Bodo Girls performing Bardoi Sikhla Dance
- Genre: Folk dance
- Inventor: Boro people
- Origin: Northeast India

Bardwi Sikhla is a Boro folk dance based on the folklore of a legendary fairy of the same name. The fairy has the power to control wind and water to create rain, hailstorm and thunder. She comes in the spring season and rejuvenates the surroundings. Trees and plants blossom and greenery appears everywhere. She is commemorated to welcome the monsoon by the Bwisagu festival. Bardwi Sikhla dance form is the enactment of her nature. In Assamese, Bardwi Sikhla is called Bordoisila.
