= Koila Moila =

- Village
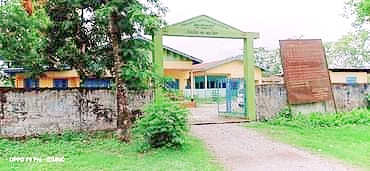

- Location within Assam Location within India
- Coordinates: 26°41′12″N 90°34′31″E
- Country: India
- State: Assam
- District: Chirang

Population
  - Total: 742 (Census 2,011)

Languages
  - Official: Boro
- Time zone: UTC+5:30 (IST)
- Postal code: 783393

Koila Moila is a village in the Chirang district of Assam state in India.It is situated 31 km away from the district headquarter of Kajalgaon and 202 km from state capital Dispur.

== Educational institutes ==
- ST Peter's E.M High school
- Zion English School
- Koila moila Junior College
- Mount Everest English School .

== Town ==
Bijni and Bongaigaon Town are the nearest to Koila Moila.
