= Jaubari, Gorkha =

Coordinates: 28°8′N 84°38′E

Jaubari जौबारी
- City
- Location in Nepal Jaubari (Nepal)
- Country: Nepal
- Zone: Gandaki Zone
- District: Gorkha District
- Constituency: Constituency no 2

Population (1991)
  - Total: 3,398
- Time zone: UTC+5:45 (Nepal Time)

Jaubari (Nepali: जौबारी) was a Village Development committee in Gorkha District in the Gandaki Zone of northern-central Nepal. At the time of the 1991 Nepal census it had a population of 3,398 and had 658 houses in the town. It is located at the western part of Gorkha district. Marichman Shrestha, former VDC chairperson, and social worker is from Jaubari-7, Gorkha. Freedom fighter late Rohini Dev Bhatta is also from the village as well as his daughter Dr. Madhabi Bhatta, who is a former commissioner of the Truth and Reconciliation Commission, Nepal. Jaubari is one of the major hubs for education and health in Gorkha District. Paropakar Adarsha Uccha Madhyamik Vidhalaya is located in Jaubari VDC of Gorkha.

== See also ==
- April 2015 Nepal earthquake
