= Aie River =

River in India

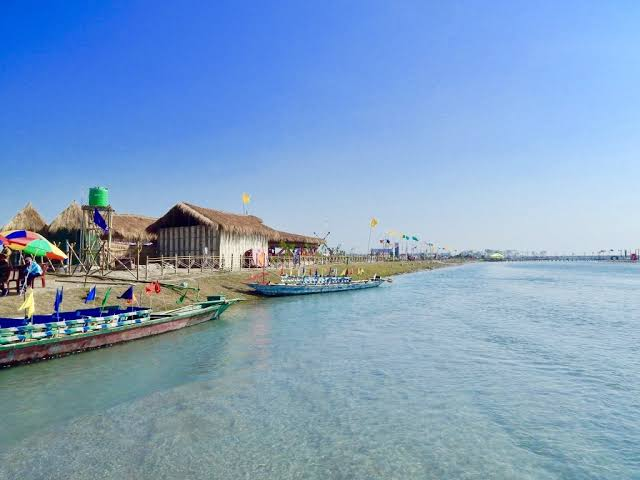
- The Dwijing Festival on the banks of Aie River

- Location within Assam Location within India
- Native name: আই নদী (Assamese)

Location
- State: Assam

Physical characteristics
- Source: Black Mountains (Bhutan)
  - location: Bhutan
  - coordinates: 26°48′11.3″N 90°40′34.2″E
- Mouth: Manas River
  - location: Bangpari, Chirang District, Assam

Basin features
- Progression: Aie River - Manas River

The Aie River is a tributary of the Manas River in the Indian state of Assam. The river originates from Black Mountains (Bhutan), flows through the Chirang district of Assam and joins Manas River at Bangpari of Chirang district. Aie means mother in Assamese language. The Dwijing Festival, which is a colorful celebration of Assam's culture, is an annual festival set on the banks of Aie river near the Hagrama bridge of Chirang district.

== Village ==
- Patabari Fv island
