= Soulmary =

Soulmary is a village in Chirang district of Assam state of India.
