= Bijni =

- town
- Location in Bijni Chirang District, India Bijni (India)
- Coordinates: 26.55667°N 90.6667°E
- Country: India
- State: Assam
- District: Chirang
- Sub-Division: Bijni

Government
  - Body: Bijni Municipal Board
- Elevation: 53 m (174 ft)

Population (2011)
  - Total: 13,257

Languages
  - Official language: Assamese, Boro
- Time zone: UTC+5:30 (IST)
- PIN: 783390
- ISO 3166 code: IN-AS
- Vehicle registration: AS-26

Bijni is a town in Chirang district under the jurisdiction of Bodoland Territorial Council which controls the districts of the Bodoland Territorial Region in the state of Assam.

== History ==
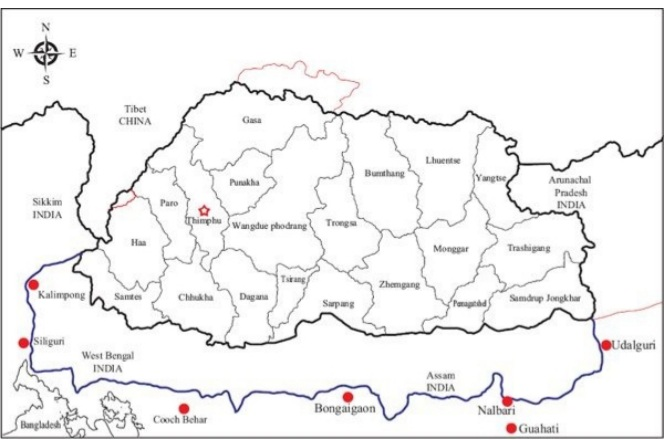
Bijni were under the Kingdom of Bhutan till the Duar War of 1865

Bijni is one of the Duars under Eastern Duars. Bijni was part of Kingdom of Bhutan from early 17th-century, for administrative purpose Bhutias divided Bijni into Bijni, Banska and Chapagur.

== Geography ==
Bijni is located on the northern bank of Brahmaputra river, at 26°31′N 90°40′E. It has an average elevation of 53 metres (173 feet). The main river in Bijni is Dolani, which currently has three bridges over it. The longest of them is the bridge between Bijni and Kawatika. The city is flanked by two bigger tributaries of the Manas River. The city also has a flyover, which cuts the road between the northern region and southern region.

== Demographics ==
As of 2011 Indian census, Bijni had a population of 13257. Males constitute 50.4% of the population and females 49.6%.

=== Religion ===
Religious Demographic in Bijni Town Committee Area (2011)
1. Hinduism (97.3%)
2. Islam (1.66%)
3. Christianity (0.84%)
4. Others (0.22%)

=== Languages ===
Languages spoken in Bijni Town Committee Area (2011)
1. Bengali (60.6%)
2. Assamese (21.2%)
3. Bodo (10.9%)
4. Hindi (6.49%)
5. Others (0.74%)

== Transport ==
Bijni railway station serves the town of Bijni.

== Politics ==
Bijni is part of Kokrajhar (Lok Sabha constituency).

== See also ==
- Bijni Vidhan Sabha
