= Adarsh Rathore =

Indian journalist and musician

Aadarsh Rathore
- Born: 12 June 1988 (age 38); Jogindernagar
- Origin: Himachal Pradesh, India
- Genres: Desi Hip Hop, Hindi, Himachali, R&B
- Occupations: Rapper, Singer, Song Writer, Journalist, Social Activist
- Years active: 2009–present
- Label: BVM Records

Aadarsh Rathore (born 12 June 1988) is an Indian journalist, musician and folk singer of Himachal Pradesh, most known for his rap song, Dhikkar Hai about the corruption in 2010 Commonwealth Games, New Delhi. He became popular in social networking sites after it was uploaded online.

Born in Joginder Nagar, Himachal Pradesh, he works as online journalist with BBC News Hindi. Earlier he was working with The Times Group. Before that he worked in a few news channels. He had initiated a campaign against the rampant corruption in CWG New Delhi. His song for the campaign was a big hit among the internet users worldwide. He bears the title to be the first rapper in a Himachali Dialect. He was appreciated for his Himachal Version of Kolaveri Di.

== Works ==
- Ase Himachali (2009)
- Aaija Ghara Jo (2009)
- Dhikkar Hai (2010)
- Shareef Mahnu (2011)
