= Adarsh Gram Yojana =

Adarsh Gram Yojana (lit. 'Model Village Scheme') may refer to these in India:

- Sansad Adarsh Gram Yojana (lit. 'Prime Minister's Model Village Scheme'), by the Parliament of India
- Pradhan Mantri Adarsh Gram Yojana (lit. 'Prime Minister's Model Village Scheme'), by the executive
