= Paropakar Adarsha Uccha Madhyamik Vidhalaya =

Shree Paropakar Adarsha Uccha Madhyamik Vidhalaya was established at 2008 Bikram Sambat. It is a fully government managed School. It lies at the educational hub Jaubari, Gandaki of Gorkha District. This school was once, the most popular school of Gorkha District. Now, more than 1000 students are currently enrolled in this school.
