= Kamal Singh Narzary =

Indian politician

Kamal Singh Narzary is a former member of the Assam Legislative Assembly, representing Bijni Vidhan Sabha constituency of Chirang district located in the Bodoland Territorial Region of Assam. He served as the MLA of Bijni from 2006 to 2021 as a member of the Bodoland People's Front party.
