= Bwisagu =

Seasonal festival of the Bodos of Assam

Bwisagu Bodo New Year
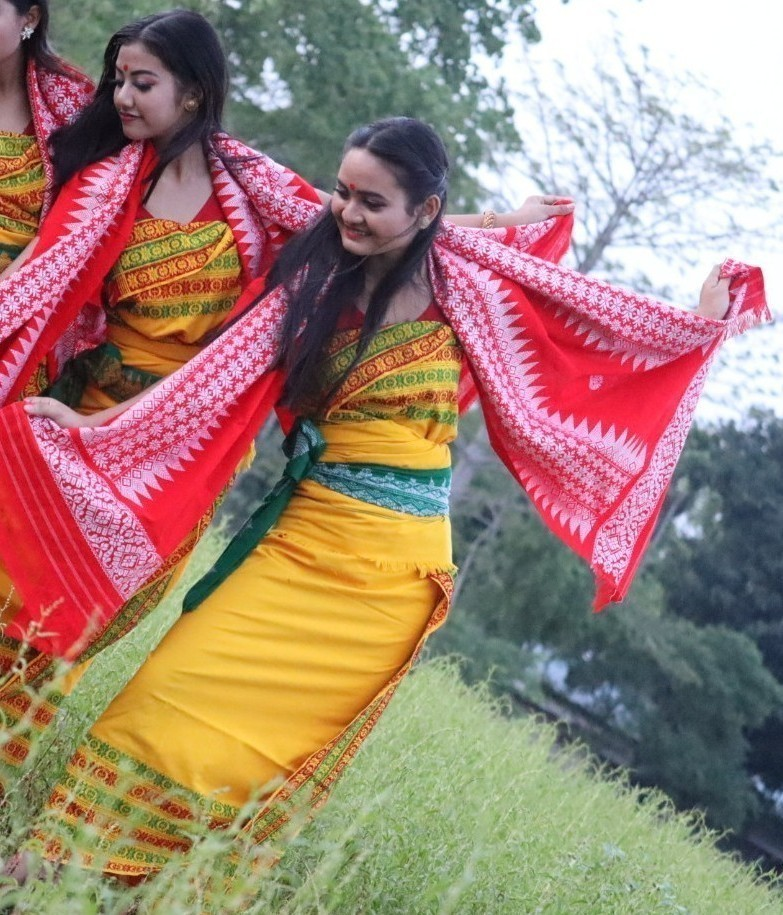
- Boro Girls performing bwisagu dance in traditional attire
- Observed by: Boros
- Type: Social, Cultural, Religious
- Significance: New Year
- Date: 1st Baisakh
- Frequency: annual
- Related to: South and Southeast Asian solar New Year

Bwisagu is one of the most popular seasonal festivals of the Bodos of Assam. This Bwisagu festival is observed at the beginning of the first month of the Boro year, around mid-April.

== Etymology ==
The Bodos call this popular festival "Bwisagu", which means the start of the new year. Bwisagu is a Boro word which originated from the word "Bwisa" that means "year" or "age" and "Agu" that means "starting" or "start".

== Celebration ==
=== Characteristics ===
The characteristics of the Bwisagu festivals can be classified as follows:

- "Gwkha-Gwkhwi Janai" or eating bitter & sour-tasting wild vegetables on the day of Sankranti, or the day before the first day of the new year.
- "Mwsou thukhwinai" or bathing of cattle
- Worshipping gods and goddesses
- Worshipping ancestors
- Merry-making and enjoyment at the beginning of the new year.

Bwisagu, as observed by Kacharis, indicates the pattern which the festival follows over several days. The first day is for the "Makhau" or "Mashau" meant for cattle, on which the cows are bathed in the river. The second day is meant for the "Mansi" or Men but starts with worshiping their gods; the third day is for "Saima" meant for dogs; the fourth day is for "Oma" meant for swine; the fifth day is for "Dao", or meant for fowl; the sixth for duck and other birds; the seventh is meant for receiving relatives and friends.

House cleaning, cattle rites, worship of Bathow and offering food to their ancestors, ruthoi of new and washed clothes, receiving and visiting relatives, friends, etc. may be said to constitute the formal part of the festival. Worshiping of Bathow is done on the second day of the festival. There is also the ceremo - eating cooked fowl with a bitter herb known as "Khungkha" or other wild vegetables with varied flavors. They also offer this to visitors.

=== Music and dance ===
Merrymaking is an integral part of this Bodo Festival. Music and dance become a regular feature. Young men play on the "Sifung" (flute), "Kham" (drum), the four-stringed "Serjã", and beat out a rhythm with a piece of split bamboo called "Thãrkhã". Girls dance in bands and play on the Jew's harp called "Gongonã" and small cymbals called "jotha".

=== Rites performed during Bwisãgu ===
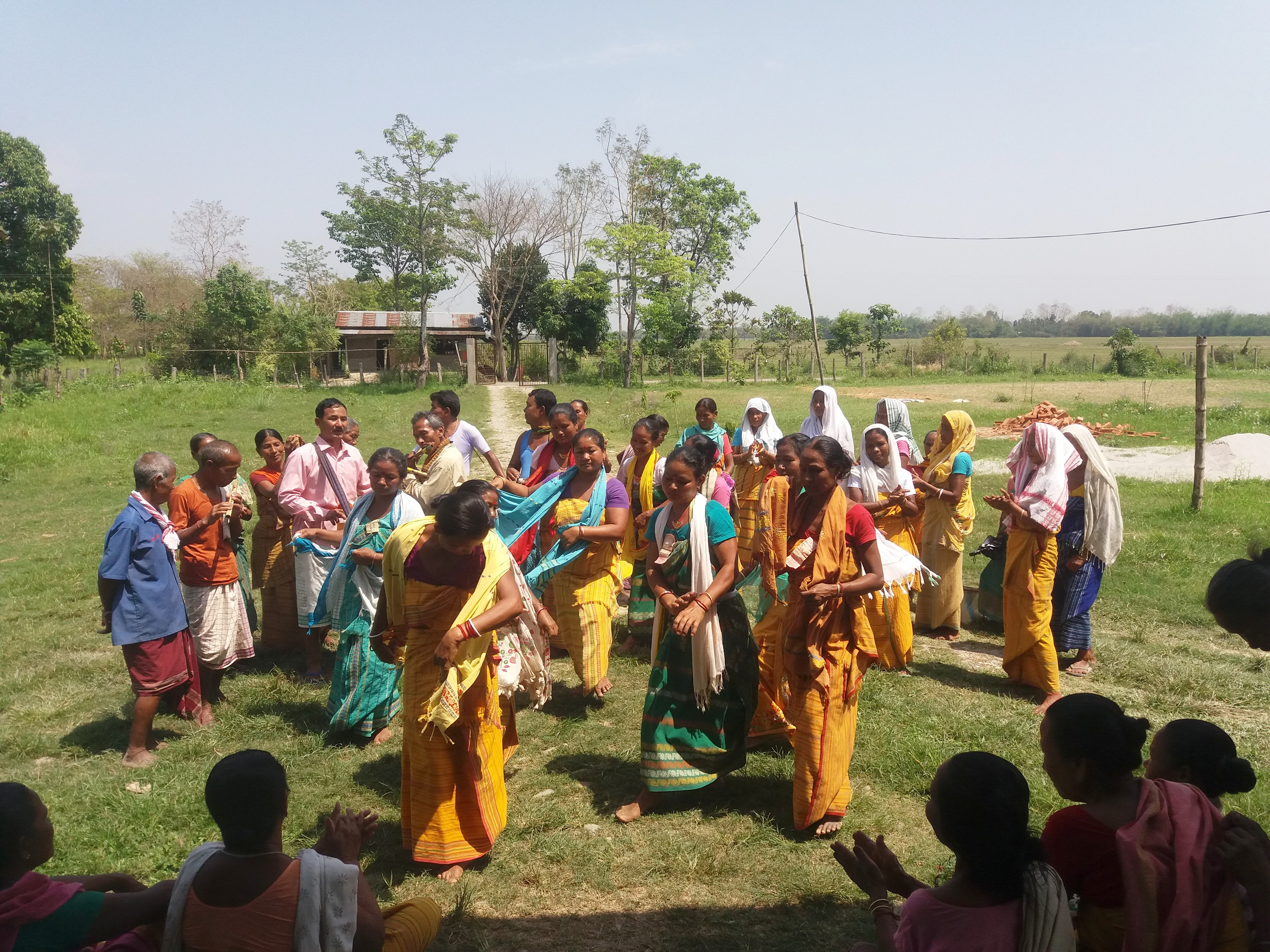
Bwisãgu dance

The Bodos perform certain rites on the occasion me the Bwisãgu festival:

- They produce a particular tune on the flute, the tune is called "Santravali". It is believed to destroy snake eggs. Because Bodos believe snakes are a foe of all creatures, annihilation of snakes is considered an act of general welfare.
- Worship the deities.
- Worship to their ancestors.
- Bid farewell to the old year.
- Pay respect to the teachers and elderly persons.
- Exchange love and affection.
- Dance and sing songs.
- Worship their god (Burãh Bãthou Mahãrãjã) with the hope of more and more production and growth of their cultivation.
- On the seventh-day bid farewell to "Bwisagu".

=== Cattle Rites during Bwisãgu ===
The last date of the month of Chaitra is called by the Bodos as the Bwisâgu for the cows or cattle. On the same day, the Bodos lead the cattle to the tank or the river for bathing. Before taking to the river or tank the cattle are offered paddy and horns and hooves are smeared with mustard oil. The body of the cow is routed with black marking with a mixture prepared from black ashes and mustard oil, using the stem of the Eri tree as the marker. The cows are also garlanded with garlands made of gourd and brinjals. Before taking them off the cowshed the owner pays respects to them. While leading the cows to the river for bathing the cowherds sing songs and beat them lightly with the "Dighalati" plant. After taking away the cows from the cowshed, the cow dunk cakes are thrown away and the shed is cleaned. The old ropes (phaga) are replaced by new ones.

== See More ==
- Bodo culture
