= Kajalgaon =

Kajalgaon Kajalgaon Town
- Town
- Location in Assam, India Kajalgaon (India)
- Coordinates: 26.474226°N 90.564443°E
- Country: India
- State: Assam
- District: Chirang

Government
  - Body: Kajalgaon Municipal Board

Languages
  - Official: Assamese, Boro
- Time zone: UTC+5:30 (IST)
- ISO 3166 code: IN-AS
- Vehicle registration: AS-26

Kajalgaon is a small town and the district headquarters of Chirang district in the Bodoland Territorial Region (BTR) of Assam. The town is created from the continuous urban area of the Bongaigaon urban agglomeration.
