= Chirang district =

- District of Assam
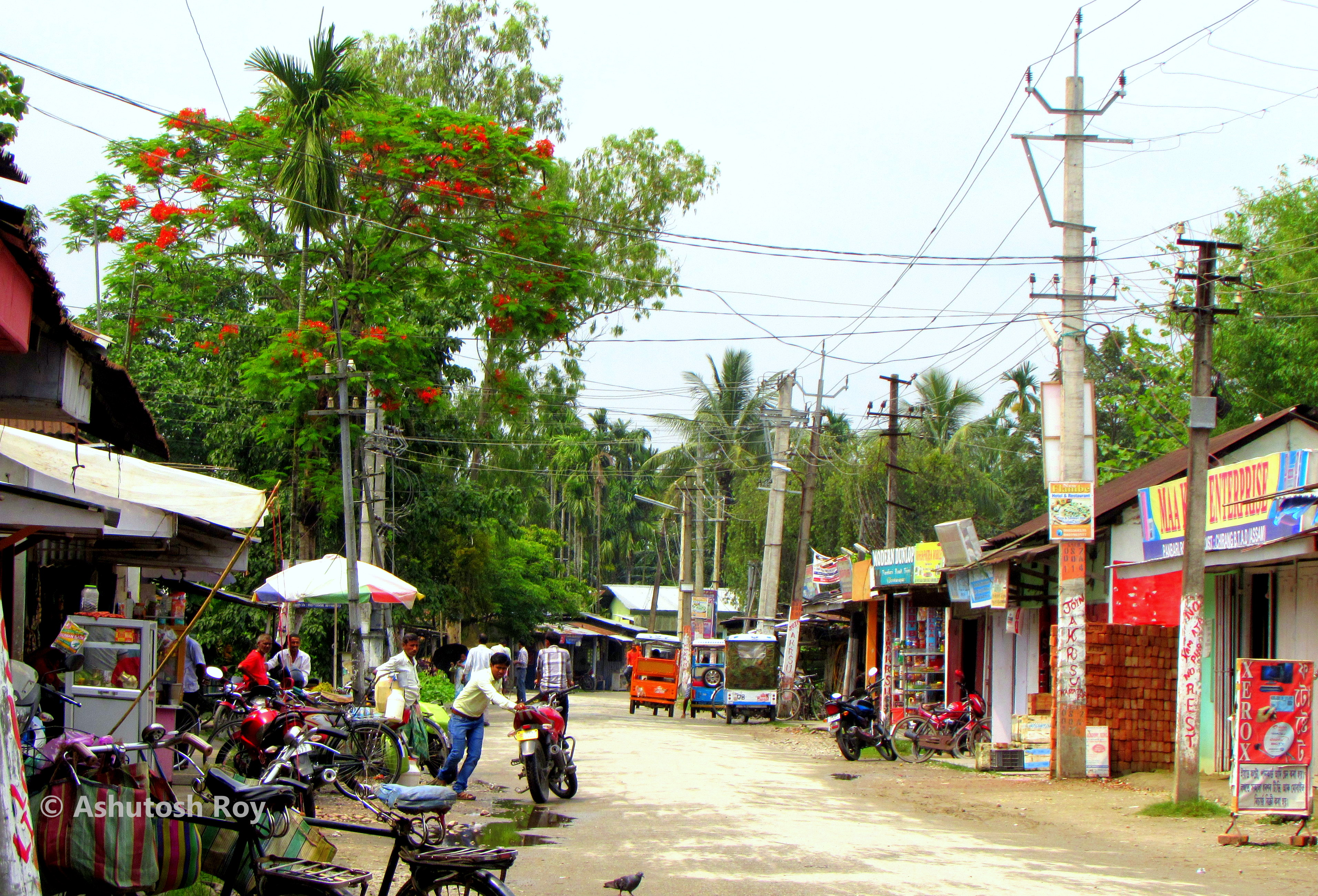
- Dewkurapaar market in Bijni
- Interactive map of Chirang district
- Coordinates (Kajalgaon): 26.58°N 90.61°E
- Country: India
- State: Assam
- Territorial Region: Bodoland
- Established: 2004
- Headquarters: Kajalgaon

Government
  - Lok Sabha constituencies: Kokrajhar (shared with Kokrajhar district)
  - Vidhan Sabha constituencies: Sidli, Bijni

Area
  - Total: 1,169.9 km^{2} (451.7 sq mi)

Population (2001)
  - Total: 482,162
  - Density: 412.14/km^{2} (1,067.4/sq mi)

Boro
- Time zone: UTC+05:30 (IST)
- Major highways: 27
- Notable educational institutions: Bengtol College; Bijni College; Basugaon College
- Website: chirang.assam.gov.in

Chirang district is an administrative district in the Bodoland Territorial Region of Assam state in the North-East of India.

== Etymology ==
The word "Chirang" has derived from Garo word – "chi" means water and "rang" means "rain".. On the other hand, most of the people regarded the word Chirang is derived from the Bodo word Chirang or Sirang. Si means life and Rang means Money.

== History ==
=== Duars ===
Chirang district falls under the Eastern Duars which includes the region between the Sankosh River and the Manas River. Guma, Bijni and Chirang Dooars are three important Dooars in Chirang district.

=== Under the Kingdom of Bhutan ===
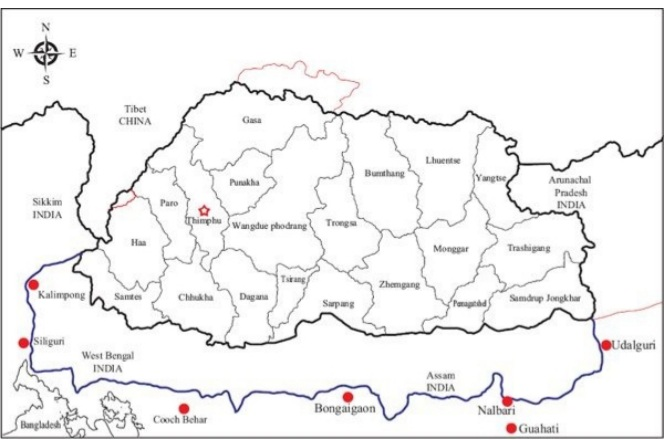
Southern Boundary of Bhutan contained the present Chirang district before the 1865 Duar War

From early 17th-century present-day Chirang district was under the control of Kingdom of Bhutan, till the Duar Wars in 1865 when British removed the Bhutanese influence and later the areas were merged to undivided Goalpara district of the Indian Union in 1949.

The Druk Desi (Dzongkha: འབྲུག་སྡེ་སྲིད་) of Bhutan appointed Paro Penlop to look after the Duars, who in turn appointed local people as Subah or Laskar, below this was an officer called Kamta who was appointed directly by the Deb Raja of Bhutan.

=== Present ===
It is a relatively new district in the Bodoland Territorial Region of Assam. Chirang district has been carved out from Bongaigaon district in 2004. Sirang was an area which is covered by valuable soil, plants, trees, flora and fauna or the things which are necessary for human life. Thus, it is a place which is important for human life or the place which is just like money or valuable for life and is later come to know Si + Rang = Sirang. After some time, the word articulated to Chirang from Sirang. And thus, the word Sirang is latter known as Chirang.

== Geography ==
Chirang is located in the lower part of Assam.It is located between longitudes 26.58°N (North) 90.61°E(East). The Chirang region has a plain geology. It additionally has undulating regions and the northern pieces of the area lie on the lower regions of Bhutan that has somewhat higher height, which is diminishing towards the southern pieces of the locale. The four sorts of soil found here are Entisols, Inceptisols, Alfisols and Ultisols. The region goes under Lower Brahmaputra Valley Agro-Climatic Zone. The environment is sub-tropical in nature with warm and sticky summer followed by dry and cool winter. The pre and post-storm months are eccentric and experience whimsical precipitation. Champabati River, Aie River and Manas River move through the area and join the Brahmaputra Waterway. Numerous different feeders, little creeks and streams course through locale.

National protected area-

- Manas National Park (Part) - protected area.

Flora and fauna-

In 1990 Chirang district became home to Manas National Park, which has an area of 500 km^{2} (193.1 mi^{2}). It shares the park with four other districts.

== Climate ==
Chirang has a moderate climate. There is a lot of rainfall in the summer, and in the winter it is quite dry again. The average annual temperature for Chirang is 33° (degrees)and there is about 248 mm of rain in a year. It is dry for 282 days a year with an average humidity of 42% and an UV-index.

== Demographics ==
Historical population
Year	Pop.	±% p.a.
1901	37,523	—
1911	48,731	+2.65%
1921	61,885	+2.42%
1931	71,977	+1.52%
1941	82,972	+1.43%
1951	90,797	+0.91%
1961	165,829	+6.21%
1971	247,085	+4.07%
1991	437,288	+2.90%
2001	433,061	−0.10%
2011	482,162	+1.08%

According to the 2011 census Chirang district has a population of 482,162, roughly equal to the nation of Suriname. This gives it a ranking of 547th in India (out of a total of 640). The district has a population density of 244 inhabitants per square kilometre (630/sq mi) . Its population growth rate over the decade 2001-2011 was 11.26%. Chirang has a sex ratio of 969 females for every 1000 males, and a literacy rate of 64.71%. 7.33% of the population lives in urban areas. Scheduled Castes and Scheduled Tribes make up 7.29% and 37.06% of the population respectively.

=== Religion ===
Religion in Chirang district (2011)
Religion	Percent
Hinduism	66.50%
Islam	22.66%
Christianity	10.32%
Other or not stated	0.52%

Hindus are the largest with 66.50%, good amount of Bodos do follow Bathouism but there is no official data predicting their numbers, they are counted under Hindus. Muslims are second with 22.66%.

=== Language ===
Languages of Chirang district (2011)
1. Boro (37.8%)
2. Bengali (28.9%)
3. Assamese (17.2%)
4. Santali (4.72%)
5. Rajbongshi (4.22%)
6. Nepali (2.51%)
7. Kurukh (1.11%)
8. Hindi (1.06%)
9. Others (2.52%)

According to the 2011 census, 37.83% of the population spoke Boro, 28.86% Bengali, 17.66% Assamese, 4.73% Santali, 4.22% Rajbongshi, 2.51% Nepali, 1.11% Kurukh and 1.06% Hindi as their first language.

== Transportation ==
Gelephu, India-Bhutan International border Gelephu, India-Bhutan crossing Gelephu is 41 km from Kajalgaon, the headquarter of Chirang, 7 km from Bongaigaon, 340 km from Siliguri.

== Tourism Gallery ==
- Kalamati

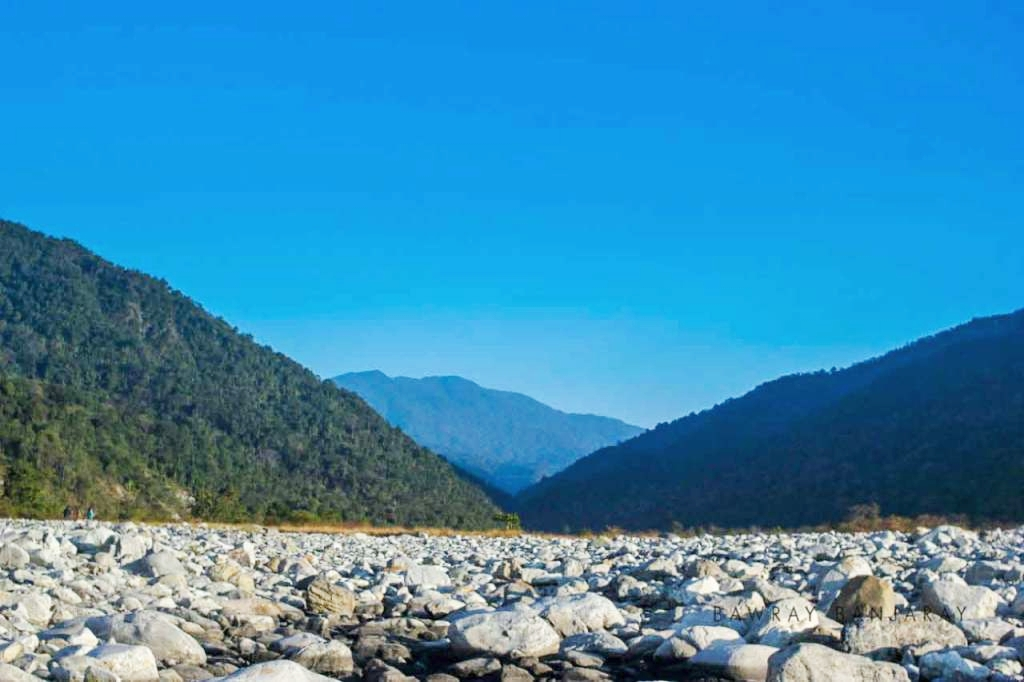
Kalamati stream

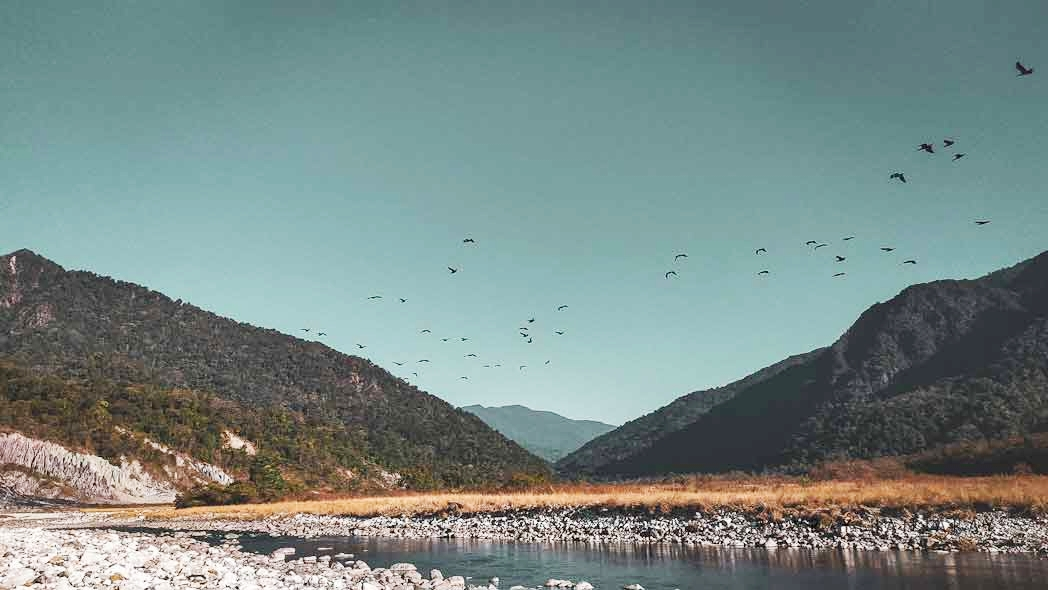
Dark view Kalamati

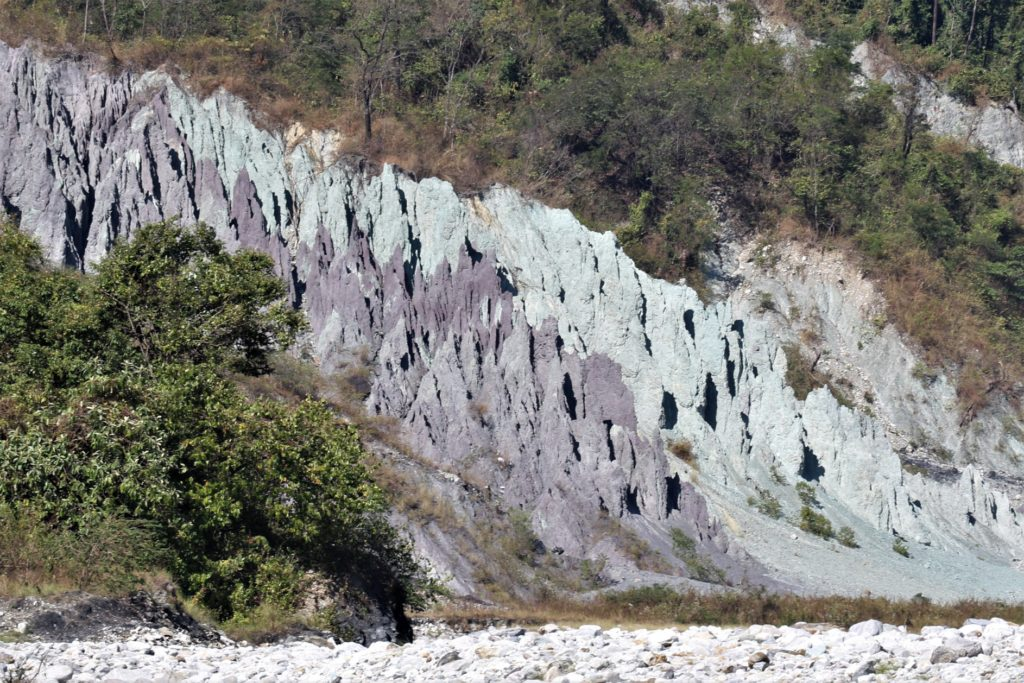
kalamati colorful hill

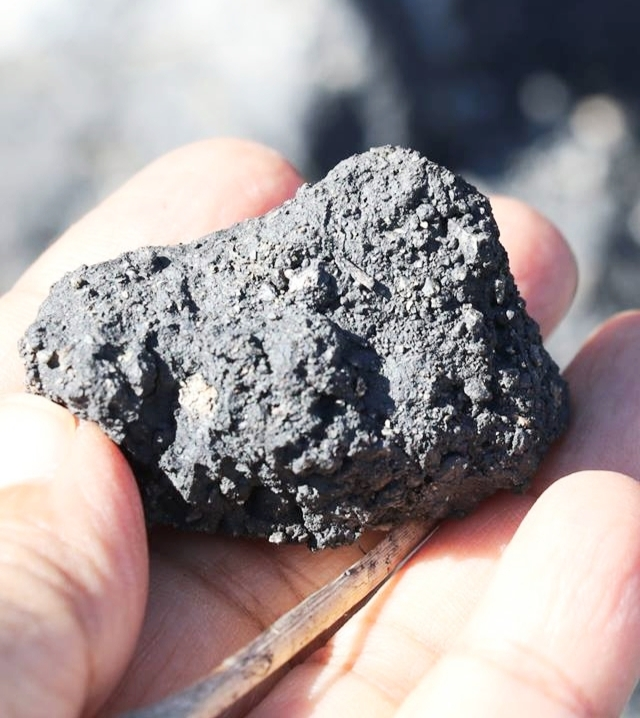
Black stone

- Mwnabili Picnic spot & Eco Tourism
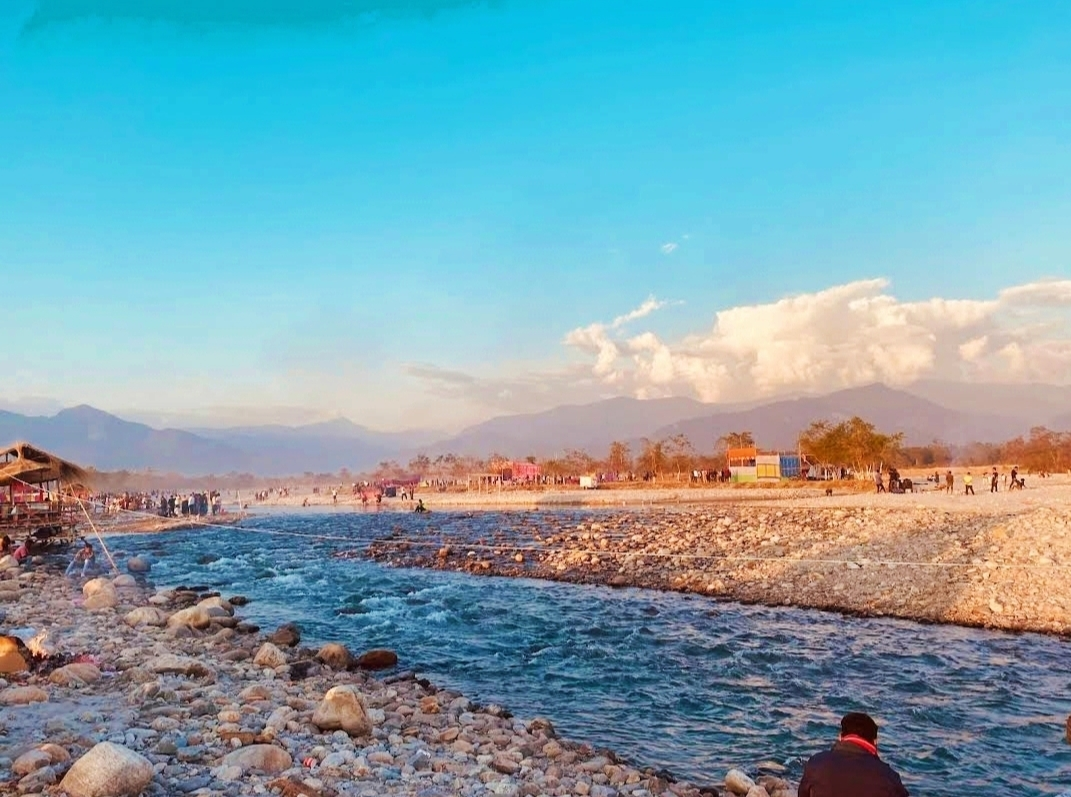
  Mwnabili Evening shadow
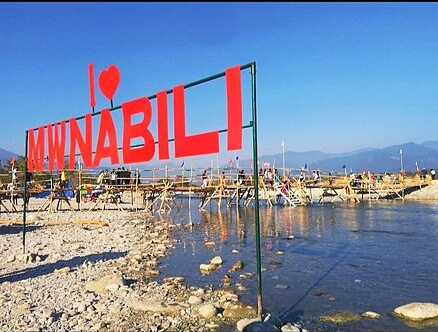
  Mwnabili picnic spot
- Nizlaguri Nizwra & Eco Tourism Picnic spot
- Aipoali Picnic Spot
- Indo-Bhutan Border Maoria Picnic spot % Eco Tourism

== Administration ==
The district has a headquarters in Kajalgaon. There are 479 revenue villages in the district.

Major Towns-

- Basugaon
- Kajalgaon
- Bijni
- Dangtola
- Kissan Bazar
- Chapaguri

Township-

- Dhaligaon
- Bongaigaon Refinery Township

Villages-

- Bengtol
- Soulmary
- Patabari (Island)
- Koila Moila
- Panbari
- Subaijhar
- Dadgari
- Gwbwr Bazar
- Laimuti F.V
- Kashikotra

== Education ==
The district has numerous colleges and higher educational institute.

Notable colleges-

- Bengtol College.
- Bijni College.
- Upendra Nath Brahma College
- Basugaon College

All the college's and higher educational institutions are Affiliated to Bodoland University.

== Industries ==
- Bongaigaon Refinery:The third refinery in Assam, located at Dhaligaon.

== Rivers ==
- Manas River
- Aie River
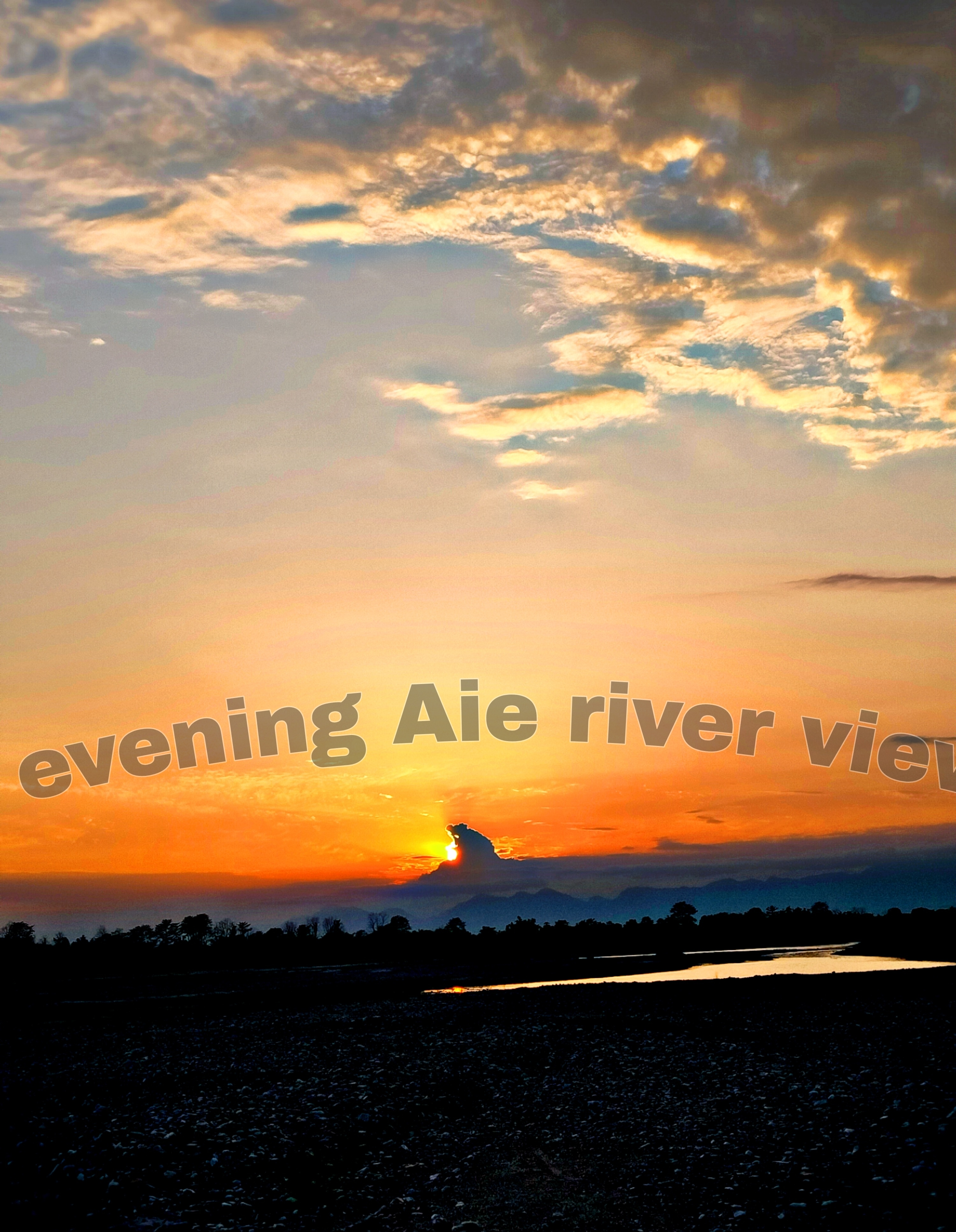
  Aie river evening shadow
- Lanker River

== Notable people ==
- Pwilao Basumatary, Boxer.
- Prem Singh Brahma, former leader of Bodo Liberation Tigers Force.
- Kamal Singh Narzary, former MLA
- Chandan Brahma, former minister of culture.

== References² ==
- Das, Smriti (1998). Assam Bhutan relations with special reference to duars from 1681 to 1949 (PhD). Guwahati University. hdl:10603/67909. Archived from the original on 16 March 2023.
- Phuntsho, Karma (2013). The History of Bhutan. Penguin Books. ISBN 9781908323583.
