= Taimur ministry =

Government of Assam, India from 1980 to 1981

- Date formed: 6 December 1980
- Date dissolved: 30 June 1981

People and organisations
- Governor: Lallan Prasad Singh
- Chief Minister: Anwara Taimur
- Member parties: Indian National Congress (I)

History
- Election: 1978
- Successor: Keshab Chandra Gogoi ministry

The Taimur ministry was the state ministry of Assam headed by Chief Minister Anwara Taimur of the Indian National Congress (I) from 6 December 1980 until its resignation on 30 June 1981. The ministry was formed after the withdrawal of President's rule imposed in the state since 12 December 1979 in the aftermath of Assam agitation against illegal foreign nationals staying in Assam under the leadership of the All Assam Students' Union (AASU) and further involvement of the United Liberation Front of Asom (ULFA) which resulted in breakdown of law and order in the state and the resignation of Chief Minister Jogendra Nath Hazarika.

Anwara Taimur of the Indian National Congress (I) was elected the chief minister, thus becoming the first and only female and Muslim to serve as chief minister of Assam. She served in the position until her resignation on 30 June 1981 and the subsequent imposition of President's rule following intensification of the agitation against illegal foreign nationals.

== Composition ==
The ministry was formed on 6 December 1980 and was sworn in into office by Governor Lallan Prasad Singh. It consisted of Chief Minister Anwara Taimur, five ministers of cabinet rank and two ministers of state. The cabinet ministers included Ramesh Chandra Saharia, Keshab Chandra Gogoi, Hiteswar Saikia, Golok Rajbanshi, A. F. Golam Osmani, while the ministers of state included Mukut Sarma and Afzalur Rahman. On 7 December, two more ministers were appointed. Dhaniram Rongpi was appointed cabinet minister while Joy Chandra Nagbanshi was appointed minister of state.

Later, Taimur was succeeded by her Finance Minister Keshab Chandra Gogoi as the state's chief minister on 13 January 1982 after the withdrawal of the president's rule in the state.

== Ministers ==
=== Cabinet Ministers ===
Portfolio	Minister	Took office	Left office	Party	Constituency
Chief Minister and also in-charge of: Department of General Administration; Department of Political; Department of Personnel and Appointments; Department of Agriculture; Department of Information and Public Relations; Department of Planning and Development; Department of Public Works; Department of Industries; Department of Revenue; Department of Cabinet Affairs; And all other departments and subjects not allocated to any other minister.	Anwara Taimur	6 December 1980	30 June 1981	INC(I)	Dalgaon
Minister of Home Affairs	Ramesh Chandra Saharia	6 December 1980	30 June 1981	IND	Panery
Minister of Finance; Minister of Judicial, Legislative and Law); Minister of Parliamentary Affairs	Keshab Chandra Gogoi	6 December 1980	30 June 1981	INC(I)	Dibrugarh
Minister of Education; Minister of Sports; Minister of Cultural Affairs; Minister of Supplies	Hiteswar Saikia	6 December 1980	30 June 1981	INC(I)	Nazira
Minister of Health and Family Welfare	Golok Rajbanshi	6 December 1980	30 June 1981	INC(I)	Rangapara
Minister of Power; Minister of Irrigation	A. F. Golam Osmani	6 December 1980	30 June 1981	INC(I)	Barkhola
Minister of Transport; Minister of Tribal Welfare	Dhaniram Rongpi	7 December 1980	30 June 1981	INC(I)	Baithalangso

=== Ministers of State ===
Portfolio	Minister	Took office	Left office	Party	Constituency
Minister of State of the Department of Flood Control; Minister of State of the Department of Forests; Minister of State of the Department of Tourism	Mukut Sarma	6 December 1980	30 June 1981	INC(I)	Nowgong
Minister of State of the Department of Panchayat and Community Development	Afzalur Rahman	6 December 1980	30 June 1981	INC(I)	Jaleswar
Minister of State of the Department of Labour	Joy Chandra Nagbanshi	7 December 1980	30 June 1981	INC(I)	Moran
