= First Saikia ministry =

Cabinet of Assam, India (1983–1985)

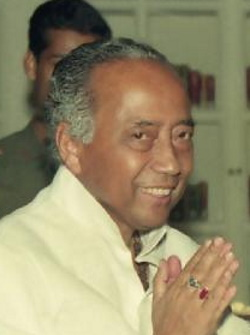
- Date formed: 28 February 1983
- Date dissolved: 23 December 1985

People and organisations
- Governor: Prakash Mehrotra; Tribeni Sahai Misra; Bhishma Narain Singh
- Chief Minister: Hiteswar Saikia
- Member party: INC
- Status in legislature: Majority 91 / 114 (80%)

History
- Election: 1983
- Outgoing election: 1985
- Predecessor: President's rule
- Successor: Mahanta I

The First ministry of Hiteswar Saikia was the Cabinet of Assam headed by Chief Minister of Assam Hiteswar Saikia that was formed after the 1983 Assam Legislative Assembly election.

== History ==
The ministry was formed after the 1983 Assam Legislative Assembly election under Chief Minister Hiteswar Saikia. The cabinet was originally composed of 13 ministers, including former Chief Ministers Anwara Taimur and Keshab Chandra Gogoi.

On 2 April 1983, 16 ministers were inducted into the Council of Ministers. On 17 May 1983, three more ministers were inducted: one cabinet minister Gobinda Chandra Langthasa, and two ministers of state, Lakhi Prasad Hazarika and Kabir Chandra Rai Pradhani. This raised the total to 32 ministers.

On 9 July 1984, the cabinet was reshuffled.

== Council of Ministers ==
=== Cabinet ===
Portfolio	Minister	Took office	Left office	Party	Constituency
Chief Minister; Minister of Home; Minister of Excise; Minister of General Administration; Minister of Tourism; Minister of Food; Minister of Civil Supplies	Hiteswar Saikia	28 February 1983	9 July 1984	INC	Nazira
Chief Minister; Minister of Administrative Reforms; Minister of Election; Minister of Excise; Minister of General Administration; Minister of Information and Publicity; Minister of Home; Minister of Passport; Minister of Personnel; Minister of Political Affairs; Minister of Printing and Stationery; Minister of Secretariat Administration; Minister of Youth Welfare; Minister of Sports; Minister of Cultural Affairs; Minister of Forest; Minister for Coordination of all Departments; All other departments not allocated to another minister	Hiteswar Saikia	9 July 1984	23 December 1985	INC	Nazira
Minister of Finance; Minister of Planning; Minister of Development	Mohammad Idris	28 February 1983	23 December 1985	INC	Rupohihat
Minister of Revenue; Minister of Industries	Keshab Chandra Gogoi	28 February 1983	23 December 1985	INC	Dibrugarh
Minister of Public Works Department; Minister of Wakfs	Anwara Taimur	28 February 1983	23 December 1985	INC	Dalgaon
Minister of Agriculture; Minister of Welfare of Plains Tribes and Backward Classes; Minister of Sericulture and Weaving	Ranendra Basumatari	28 February 1983	23 December 1985	INC	Kokrajhar West
Minister of Fisheries; Minister of Panchayat; Minister of Community Development	Upendra Das	28 February 1983	23 December 1985	INC	Boko
Minister of Forest Areas; Minister of Soil Conservation	Dhaniram Rongpi	28 February 1983	23 December 1985	INC	Baithalangso
Minister of Irrigation	Zahirul Islam	28 February 1983	23 December 1985	INC	Mankachar
Minister of Transport; Minister of Town and Country Planning	Jagannath Singh	28 February 1983	23 December 1985	INC	Udharbond
Minister of Education	Mukut Sharma	28 February 1983	23 December 1985	INC	Nowgong
Minister of Animal Husbandry; Minister of Veterinary	Jagdish Chandra Choudhury	28 February 1983	23 December 1985	INC	Silchar
Minister of Labour	Rameswar Dhanowar	28 February 1983	23 December 1985	INC	Digboi
Minister of Cooperation; Minister of Public Enterprises	Tilok Gogoi	2 April 1983	23 December 1985	INC	Teok
Minister of Agriculture	Golok Rajbanshi	2 April 1983	23 December 1985	INC	Rangapara
Minister of Health and Family Welfare	Bhumidhar Barman	2 April 1983	23 December 1985	INC	Dharmapur
Minister of Relief and Rehabilitation; Minister of Technology and Environment	Sadhan Ranjan Sarkar	2 April 1983	9 July 1984	INC	Hojai
Minister of Veterinary; Minister of Animal Husbandry; Minister of Relief and Rehabilitation; Minister of Municipal Administration	Sadhan Ranjan Sarkar	9 July 1984	23 December 1985	INC	Hojai
Minister of Parliamentary Affairs	Abdul Muhib Mazumder	2 April 1983	9 July 1984	INC	Hailakandi
Minister of Parliamentary Affairs; Minister of Judicial Affairs; Minister of Legislative Affairs; Minister of Power; Minister of Jails	Abdul Muhib Mazumder	9 July 1984	23 December 1985	INC	Hailakandi
Minister of Rural Development	Ragunath Pamegam	2 April 1983	23 December 1985	INC	Dhakuakhana
Minister of Social Welfare	Dipok Moormoo	2 April 1983	9 July 1984	INC	Lahowal
Minister of Social Welfare; Minister of Child Welfare	Dipok Moormoo	9 July 1984	23 December 1985	INC	Lahowal
Minister of Revenue	Padam Bahadur Chouhan	9 July 1984	23 December 1985	INC	Tamulpur
Minister of Home; Minister of Relief and Rehabilitation; Minister of Protocol	Abdul Muqtadir Choudhury	9 July 1984	23 December 1985	INC	Karimganj South
Minister of Transport; Minister of Char Development	Ibrahim Ali	9 July 1984	23 December 1985	INC	Baghbar
Minister of Health and Family Welfare	Lambheswar Sonowal	9 July 1984	23 December 1985	INC	Sadiya
Minister of Food; Minister of Civil Supplies	Nagen Neog	9 July 1984	23 December 1985	INC	Golaghat
Minister of Public Works Department	Munin Sarmah	9 July 1984	23 December 1985	INC	Gauhati East
Minister of Education	Luis Islari	9 July 1984	23 December 1985	INC	Sidli
Minister of Fisheries; Minister of Irrigation	Lakhi Prasad Hazarika	9 July 1984	23 December 1985	INC	Raha
Minister of Hills Plan; Minister of Twenty-Point Programme (Hills); Minister of Public Health Engineering	Dorsingh Terang	9 July 1984	23 December 1985	INC	Howraghat
Minister of Flood Control; Minister of Welfare of Plains Tribes and Scheduled Castes	Borgoram Deori	9 July 1984	23 December 1985	INC	Bihpuria

=== Junior ministers ===
Portfolio	Minister	Took office	Left office	Party	Constituency
Minister of State for Animal Husbandry; Minister of State for Veterinary; Minister of State for Panchayat; Minister of State for Community Development	Padam Bahadur Chouhan	28 February 1983	9 July 1984	INC	Tamulpur
Minister of State for Industries	Abdul Muqtadir Choudhury	2 April 1983	9 July 1984	INC	Karimganj South
Minister of State for Education	Ibrahim Ali	2 April 1983	9 July 1984	INC	Baghbar
Minister of State for Rural Development; Minister of State for Twenty-Point Programme; Minister of State for Judiciary	Tankeswar Dehingia	2 April 1983	23 December 1985	INC	Thowra
Minister of State for Power (Electricity)	Dinanath Rajkhowa	2 April 1983	9 July 1984	INC	Jorhat
Minister of State for Forest; Minister of State for Rural Electrification; Minister of State in charge of Capital Construction; Minister of State for Border Area Development	Dinanath Rajkhowa	9 July 1984	23 December 1985	INC	Jorhat
Deputy Minister of Health and Family Welfare	Lambheswar Sonowal	2 April 1983	9 July 1984	INC	Sadiya
Deputy Minister of Home; Deputy Minister of Food and Civil Supplies	Nagen Neog	2 April 1983	9 July 1984	INC	Golaghat
Deputy Minister of Irrigation; Deputy Minister of Youth Welfare and Sports; Deputy Minister of Public Health Engineering	Munin Sarmah	2 April 1983	9 July 1984	INC	Gauhati East
Deputy Minister of Public Works Department	Luis Islari	2 April 1983	9 July 1984	INC	Sidli
Deputy Minister of Welfare of Plains Tribes and Backward Classes	Kul Bahadur Chetri	2 April 1983	23 December 1985	INC	Margherita
Minister of State for Cooperation; Minister of State for Agriculture; Minister of State in charge of Other Backward Classes	Kabir Chandra Roypradhani	9 July 1984	23 December 1985	INC	Golakganj
Minister of State for Panchayat; Minister of State for Community Development	Nepal Chandra Das	9 July 1984	23 December 1985	INC	Katigora
Minister of State for Industries; Minister of State for Youth Welfare; Minister of State for Sports	Jiba Kanta Gogoi	9 July 1984	23 December 1985	INC	Khumtai
Minister of State for Labour and Employment; Minister of State for Khadi and Village Industries	Mithius Tudu	9 July 1984	23 December 1985	INC	Gossaigaon
