= Borbora ministry =

Council of Ministers of Assam (1978–1979)

- 14th Cabinet of Assam
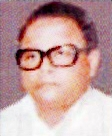
- Portrait of Chief Minister Borbora
- Date established: 12 March 1978
- Date dissolved: 4 September 1979

Leadership and composition
- Governor: Lallan Prasad Singh
- Chief Minister: Golap Borbora
- Member parties: Janata Party
- Opposition party: Indian National Congress

Formation and history
- Election: 1978
- Predecessor: Sinha ministry
- Successor: Hazarika ministry

The Borbora ministry was the state ministry of Assam headed by Chief Minister Golap Borbora of the Janata Party from 12 March 1978 until its resignation on 4 September 1979. The ministry was formed in the aftermath of the post-Emergency election in the state held in 1978 resulting in the victory of the Janata Party in the state. Borbora became the first non-Congress chief minister of the state and ousted the government of Sarat Chandra Sinha who had been in power since January 1972. The ministry remained in office until Borbora's resignation on 4 September 1979 and his subsequent replacement by Speaker of the Assembly Jogendra Nath Hazarika.

== Composition ==
The ministry was formed on 12 March 1978 and sworn in into office by Governor Lallan Prasad Singh. It consisted of Chief Minister Golap Borbora, nine ministers of cabinet rank and two ministers of state. The cabinet ministers included Dulal Baruah, Keshab Chandra Gogoi, Lakshyadhar Choudhury, Soneswar Bora, Samar Brahma Choudhury, A. F. Golam Osmani, Jagannath Singh, Lakheshwar Gohain, and Zahirul Islam. The ministers of state included Kosheswar Bora and Lilamoy Das. The ministry was expanded on 21 March 1978 and four ministers were included, two of cabinet rank and two of minister of state rank. Ramesh Mohan Kouli and Sona Ram Thaosen were appointed as cabinet ministers, while Gandhi Ram Timung and Ramani Barman were appointed as ministers of state. All the ministers except for Samar Brahma Choudhury belonged to the Janata Party, while Brahma belonged to the Plain Tribals Council of Assam.

== Ministers ==
| Portfolio | Minister | Took office | Left office | Party | Constituency |
|---|---|---|---|---|---|
| Chief Minister and also in-charge of: Department of Home; Department of Information and Public Relations; Department of General Administration; Department of Political; Department of Planning and Development; Department of Election; Department of Civil Defence; Department of Personnel and Administrative Reforms; Department of Secretariat Administration; Department of Minority Affairs; Department of Freedom Fighters; Department of Social Welfare; And all other departments and subjects not allocated to any other minister. | Golap Borbora | 12 March 1978 | 4 September 1979 | JP | Tinsukia |
| Minister of Public Works Department (Roads and Buildings); Minister of Supply; Minister of Trade and Commerce; Minister of Parliamentary Affairs; Minister of Jails | Dulal Baruah | 12 March 1978 | 4 September 1979 | JP | Jorhat |
| Minister of Finance; Minister of Judicial and Legislative (Law); Minister of Students and Youth Welfare; Minister of Sports; Minister of Tourism | Keshab Chandra Gogoi | 12 March 1978 | 4 September 1979 | JP | Dibrugarh |
| Minister of Education; Minister of Cultural Affairs | Lakshyadhar Choudhury | 12 March 1978 | 4 September 1979 | JP | Jalukbari |
| Minister of Agriculture; Minister of Co-operation | Soneswar Bora | 12 March 1978 | 4 September 1979 | JP | Golaghat |
| Minister of Forests; Minister of Livestock, Minister of Veterinary and Animal Husbandry | Samar Brahma Choudhury | 12 March 1978 | 4 September 1979 | PTC | Kokrajhar East |
| Minister of Irrigation; Minister of Power; Minister of Mines and Minerals; Minister of Wakf Property | A. F. Golam Osmani | 12 March 1978 | 4 September 1979 | JP | Barkhola |
| Minister of Labour; Minister of Industries; Minister of Public Enterprises | Jagannath Singh | 12 March 1978 | 4 September 1979 | JP | Udharbond |
| Minister of Revenue; Minister of Land Reforms; Minister of Soil Conservation | Lakheshwar Gohain | 12 March 1978 | 4 September 1979 | JP | Barhampur |
| Minister of Transport; Minister of Panchayats and Community Development; Minister of Municipal Administration; Minister of Town and Country Planning | Zahirul Islam | 12 March 1978 | 4 September 1979 | JP | Mankachar |
| Minister of Flood Control | Ramesh Mohan Kouli | 21 March 1978 | 4 September 1979 | JP | Jonai |
| Minister of Hill Areas Development; Minister of Printing and Stationery; Minister of Registration and Stamps | Golap Borbora | 12 March 1978 | 21 March 1978 | JP | Tinsukia |
| Minister of Hill Areas Development; Minister of Printing and Stationery; Minister of Registration and Stamps | Sonaram Thaosen | 21 March 1978 | 4 September 1978 | JP | Haflong |
| Minister of Sericulture and Weaving; Minister of Khadi and Village Industries | Golap Borbora | 12 March 1978 | 21 March 1978 | JP | Tinsukia |
| Minister of Sericulture and Weaving; Minister of Khadi and Village Industries | Gandhi Ram Timung | 21 March 1978 | 4 September 1978 | JP | Diphu |
| Minister of State of the Department of Health and Family Welfare; Minister of State of the Department of Excise | Kosheswar Bora | 12 March 1978 | 4 September 1979 | JP | Biswanath |
| Minister of State of the Department of Fisheries; Minister of State of the Department of Relief and Rehabilitation | Lilamoy Das | 12 March 1978 | 4 September 1979 | JP | Ratabari |
| Minister of State in the Department of Education; Minister of State in the Department of Youth Welfare | Ramani Barman | 21 March 1978 | 4 September 1979 | JP | Dharmapur |
