= Hazarika ministry =

1979 cabinet in the Indian state of Assam

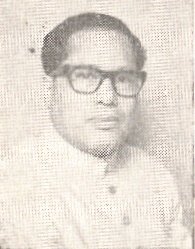
- Date established: 9 September 1979
- Date dissolved: 11 December 1979

Leadership and composition
- Governor: Lokanath Misra
- Chief Minister: Jogendra Nath Hazarika
- Member parties: Janata party
- Opposition party: Indian National Congress

Formation and history
- Predecessor: Borbora ministry
- Successor: President's rule

The Hazarika Ministry was the Cabinet of Assam headed by Chief Minister of Assam Jogendra Nath Hazarika. The Ministry lasted from 9 September 1979 to 11 December 1979.

== Ministers ==
Portfolio	Minister	Took office	Left office	Party	Constituency
Chief Minister and also in-charge of: Department of Home; Department of Political; Department of Personnel and Administrative Reforms; Department of General Administration; Department of Information and Public Relations; Department of Planning and Development; Department of Election; Department of Civil Defence; Department of Secretariat Administration; Department of Freedom Fighters; Department of Social Welfare; And all other departments and subjects not allocated to any other minister.	Jogendra Nath Hazarika	9 September 1979	11 December 1979	JP	Duliajan
Minister of Education; Minister of Cultural Affairs	Premadhar Bora	9 September 1979	11 December 1979	IND	Bihpuria
Minister of Finance; Minister of Revenue; Minister of Judicial and Legislative (Law); Minister of Students and Youth Welfare; Minister of Sports	Keshab Chandra Gogoi	9 September 1979	11 December 1979	JP	Dibrugarh
Minister of Public Works Department; Minister of Tourism; Minister of Health and Family Welfare	Tarini Mohan Barua	9 September 1979	11 December 1979	JP	Dispur
Minister of Flood Control; Minister of Minority Affairs	Zahirul Islam	9 September 1979	11 December 1979	JP	Mankachar
Minister of Irrigation; Minister of Excise	Rabindra Nath Choudhury	9 September 1979	11 December 1979	JP	Abhayapuri South
Minister of Veterinary and Animal Husbandry; Minister of Development; Minister of Town and Country Planning	Santi Ranjan Das Gupta	9 September 1979	11 December 1979	JP	Hojai
Minister of Hill Areas Development; Minister of Jails	Sonaram Thaosen	9 September 1979	11 December 1979	JP	Haflong
Minister of Forests; Minister of Sericulture and Weaving; Minister of Khadi and Village Industries	Ramesh Chandra Saharia	9 September 1979	11 December 1979	IND	Panery
Minister of Labour; Minister of Power; Minister of Mines and Minerals	Jagannath Singh	9 September 1979	11 December 1979	JP	Udharbond
Minister of Supply; Minister of Co-operation; Minister of Parliamentary Affairs	Altaf Hossain Mazumdar	9 September 1979	11 December 1979	JP	Jorhat
Minister of State for Panchayats and Community Development	Afzalur Rahman	9 September 1979	11 December 1979	JP	Jaleswar
Minister of State for Rural Development; Minister of State for Land Revenue and Reforms	Silvius Condpan	9 September 1979	11 December 1979	JP	Majbat
Minister of State for Public Health Engineering; Minister of State for Municipal Administration	Tarini Charan Das	9 September 1979	11 December 1979	JP	Bhabanipur
