= Keshab Chandra Gogoi =

9th Chief Minister of Assam

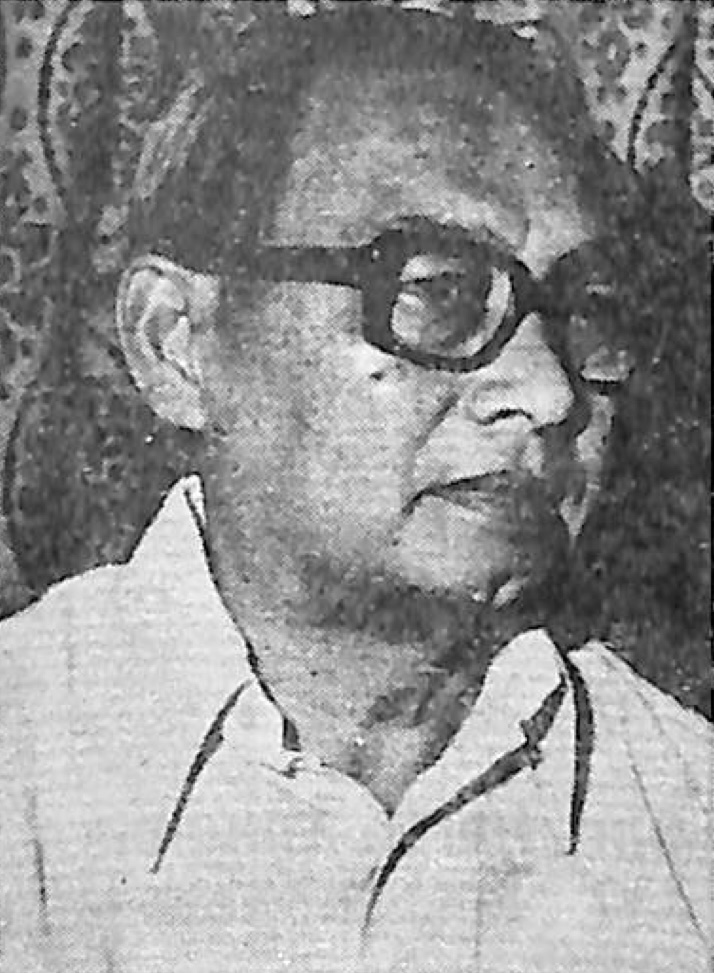
- Official portrait, c.1978–1982

9th Chief Minister of Assam
- In office 13 January 1982 – 19 March 1982
- Governor: Prakash Mehrotra
- Preceded by: Anwara Taimur (Note: President's rule from 30 June 1981 to 12 January 1982)
- Succeeded by: Hiteswar Saikia (Note: President's rule from 19 March 1982 to 27 February 1983)
Ministerial offices
Minister for Public Enterprises
In office 18 October 1991 – 27 November 1991
Chief Minister	Hiteswar Saikia
Minister for Planning and Development
In office 30 June 1991 – 18 October 1991
Chief Minister	Hiteswar Saikia
Minister for the Public Works Department
In office c.1984 – 23 December 1985
Chief Minister	Hiteswar Saikia
Minister for Revenue and Industries
In office 27 February 1983 – c.1984
Chief Minister	Hiteswar Saikia
Minister for Finance, Judicial, Legislative, Law, and Parliamentary Affairs
In office 6 December 1980 – 30 June 1981
Chief Minister	Anwara Taimur
Minister for Finance, Revenue, Law, Sports, Students and Youth Welfare
In office 9 September 1979 – 11 December 1979
Chief Minister	Jogendra Nath Hazarika
Minister for Finance, Judicial, Legislative, and Law
In office 12 March 1978 – 17 July 1979
Chief Minister	Golap Borbora

Member of Assam Legislative Assembly
- In office 21 March 1978 – 11 June 1996
- Preceded by: Ramesh Chandra Barooah
- Succeeded by: Kalyan Kumar Gogoi
- Constituency: Dibrugarh

Personal details
- Born: 29 September 1926 Sibsagar, Assam Province, British India
- Died: 5 August 1998 (aged 71) Dibrugarh, Assam, India
- Party: All India Indira Congress (Tiwari) (1996); Indian National Congress (1980–1995); Assam Janata Dal (1979–1980); Janata Party (1978–1979)
- Spouse: Shanti Gohain (m. 1951)
- Children: Anjan; Ranjan; Nirjan; Indira; Nandita
- Parent: Bhogram Gogoi (father)
- Relatives: Jogesh Chandra Gohain (father-in-law); Padma Kumari Gohain (mother-in-law)
- Education: Banaras Hindu University (BA) (LLB)
- Occupation: Politician; advocate; social worker; practitioner

Keshab Chandra Gogoi (29 September 1926 – 5 August 1998) was an Indian statesman and lawyer who served as the 9th chief minister of Assam from January to March 1982. He was the member of Assam Legislative Assembly (MLA) for Dibrugarh from 1978 to 1996. Gogoi held various ministerial positions under numerous chief ministers between 1978 and 1991, most prominently serving as finance minister under three different governments.

Born in Sibsagar to an Ahom family, Gogoi studied at Banaras Hindu University; while a student there, he participated in the Quit India movement in 1942. He began his legal career in Sibsagar in 1949, before shifting his practice to Dibrugarh in 1953. He was elected a member of the Bar Council of Assam and Nagaland in 1971, and became a senior advocate of the Gauhati High Court in 1975. At the 1978 Assam Legislative Assembly election, Gogoi was elected the MLA for Dibrugarh for the Janata Party. He was appointed the finance minister under Golap Borbora in March 1978 before he resigned after a July 1979 reshuffle. He defected to the Assam Janata Dal in 1979 and was appointed finance minister under Jogendra Nath Hazarika. In 1980, Gogoi defected to the Indian National Congress (I) where he then returned as finance minister under Anwara Taimur until president's rule was imposed in June 1981. He was considered a potential candidate for Chief Minister in both 1979 and 1981.

After the expiration of president's rule in Assam, Gogoi emerged as the frontrunner for the Congress party leadership and he was subsequently invited to form a government by governor Prakash Mehrotra in January 1982. Under his administration, he undertook the implementation of the National Rural Employment Scheme, supported the 20-point programme launched by prime minister Indira Gandhi, and released Assamese police officials who had been arrested by the previous government under Taimur. His chief ministership came amid the political instability during the Assam movement. Although generally considered softer towards the movement, he threatened to ban the All Assam Students Union (AASU), and initiated a process to identify Muslims who might have crossed from Bangladesh to Assam between 1961 and 1971. His tenure was also marked by internal party conflicts which left him without stable legislative support. Facing an opposition motion of no confidence, Gogoi resigned in March, having served for two months.

After leaving office, Gogoi was reelected as an MLA in the 1983 election and served as a cabinet minister under Hiteswar Saikia until Congress lost the 1985 election. After the party returned to power in 1991, Gogoi again served as a minister under Saikia until he was dismissed from the cabinet amid political disagreements with Saikia. After his expulsion from Congress (I) in 1995, he was nominated as the All India Indira Congress (tiwari) candidate for Dibrugarh in the 1996 election but was defeated by the INC candidate. His eighteen-year-long political career ended in 1996, and he died at the age of 71 in 1998. Gogoi's eldest son, Anjan Gogoi, went on to serve as an Air Marshal in the Indian Air Force, and his second son, Ranjan Gogoi, became the 46th chief justice of India and a member of the Rajya Sabha.

== Early life and career ==
=== Background and education ===
Gogoi was born on 29 September 1926 in the village Lanlak, in Sibsagar, Assam province. He was born into an Ahom family as the son of Bhogram Gogoi.

Gogoi attended Banaras Hindu University where he obtained a Bachelor of Arts (BA). He participated in the 1942 Quit India movement while a student of the university, and was subsequently "externed" from the university. Gogoi also studied at the Banaras Law College where he received a Bachelor of Laws (LLB). He was elected secretary and then president of the Banaras Law College union.

=== Legal career and social work ===
Gogoi began his legal practice in 1949 in Sibsagar, and then shifted his practice to the Dibrugarh district court in 1953. He was elected a Member of the Bar Council of Assam and Nagaland in 1971, and became a senior advocate of the Gauhati High Court in 1975. Gogoi also worked as a social worker before his entry to politics.

== Early political career ==
=== Janata Party (1978–1979) ===
Gogoi was elected to Assam Legislative Assembly in the 1978 election as the Janata Party candidate in Dibrugarh. He received 22,003 votes, 57.84% of the total vote, and defeated his nearest opponent by 11,930 votes. He became the minister for finance, judicial, legislative, and law under Chief Minister Golap Borbora in his cabinet. On 9 April 1979, he formally inaugurated the Agricultural Development Branch of the State Bank of India in his role as finance minister. He also urged the central government to take control of the flood system in the state following the 1979 floods. As finance minister under Borbora, he was tasked with filling the estimated ₹47.49 crore (US$4.9 million) budget deficit, which he described as a "herculean task", in a state where additional resource mobilisation was described as limited. One of the policies to help reduce the deficit was the proposed increase in the exemption limit of the agricultural income-tax from ₹8,000 (US$83) to ₹10,000 (US$100).

In July 1979, Borbora reshuffled his ministry; Gogoi was reappointed to the government. However, shortly after his reappointment, Gogoi and Jagnath Singha, resigned due to dissatisfaction with the portfolios allocation in the reshuffle. Gogoi resigned on 17 July and Singha the following day; Gogoi and other rebels staked their claim to form a ministry. They reportedly alleged that Borbora was "misusing administrative machinery and stalling developmental activities".

=== Janata Dal (1979–1980) ===
After leaving the Borbora cabinet, Gogoi defected to the Assam Janata Dal in 1979. By August 1979, he emerged as one of three potential candidates for Chief Minister along with Hiteswar Saikia, supported by Jogendra Nath Hazarika, and Tarini Mohan Barua. However, Hazarika became Chief Minister, and Gogoi subsequently returned as finance minister in Hazarika's cabinet. In December 1979, support for the Hazarika ministry declined; the Communist Party of India (CPI) had already been dissatisfied with Hazarika, and on 11 December the Congress (U) withdrew its support. Subsequently, eleven ministers and two parliamentary secretaries led by Gogoi resigned, and the Hazarika ministry collapsed. After the resignation of Hazarika, Gogoi was elected the leader of the Assam Janata Dal party.

=== Congress party (1980–1981) ===
With the 1980 Indira Gandhi wave in the Assam assembly, (Note: The 1980 Indira Gandhi wave in the Assam assembly was when an unprecedented number of MLAs defected to Congress (I). The number of Congress legislators in the assembly increased from 8 MLAs in 1978 to 45 MLAs by December 1980. A large number of the MLAs were influenced to defect by the emergence of Gandhi once again as a powerful leader.) Gogoi defected to the Indian National Congress (I) and became minister for finance, judicial, legislative, law, and parliamentary affairs in the cabinet under Anwara Taimur. He served until June 1981. As finance minister, both he and home minister Ramesh Saharia made efforts to break the deadlock by initiating discussions with student leaders over the Assam movement after receiving permission from prime minister Gandhi. As finance minister, India Today reported that he was left "gaping" after an appraisal of the state's finances as the tax realisation was less than half of what was expected, leaving him "hard-pressed" to clear the backlog of unspent funds. He presented his budget on 23 March 1981 for the 1981–82 assembly year; the budget was a ₹364,100,000 (US$3.8 million) deficit which was left uncovered, which Gogoi attributed to higher plan outlay for the year. He did not propose any further taxes in the budget. As law minister, Organiser reported that he was reluctant to appoint Abdul Muhib Mazumder as the advocate general of Assam, which Taimur was in favour of.

Amid the political instability after the Taimur government survived a motion of no confidence in April 1981, and with reported cabinet discontent over Taimur's leadership, Gogoi was widely speculated as a potential leadership candidate. On 15 April, India Today argued that he was not yet a "serious challenger" due to his recent defection from Janata party to Congress (I), which they suggested meant he had not built a "rapport" with partymen, but reported that Gogoi "may be a man to watch in the future".

== Chief Ministership (1982) ==
=== Appointment ===
==== Background ====
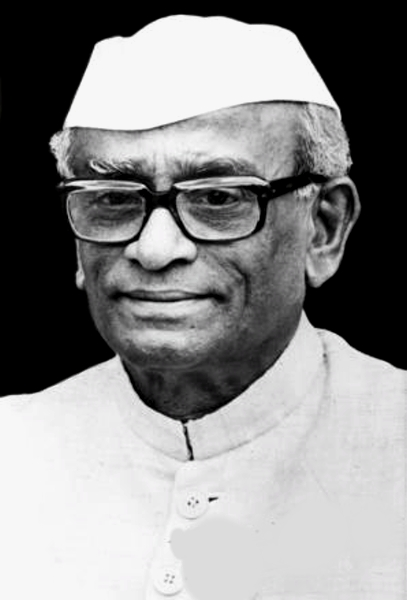
Neelam Sanjiva Reddy (pictured) had imposed President's rule in Assam in June 1981.

President's rule had been imposed in Assam in June 1981 when the government of Anwara Taimur failed to get the Assam appropriation bill passed by the assembly. President Neelam Sanjiva Reddy issued a proclamation revoking president's rule imposed on Assam on 30 June 1981, and then extending for another term of six months. Immediately after the fall and resignation of the Taimur government, a group of parties entitled the "left democratic front" or Left Democratic Alliance (LDA), consisting of twelve parties including the Congress (U), Janata Party, and the Assam Janata Party, emerged. They expressed their interest in forming a government led by either former chief minister Sarat Chandra Sinha or former chief minister Golap Borbora. The governor of Assam, Prakash Mehrotra, however declined to allow the formation of a government by the left democratic front on the grounds that there was a lack of evidence of support amongst MLAs. Taimur was still leader of the Assam Congress legislature party, and claimed the support of fifty-one party members to form a government, but she was advised by central leaders of the party to wait. After this, two candidates for the chief ministership remained; Gogoi and Jogendra Nath Hazarika. On 8 December 1981, Hazarika, with four of his supporters, approached Congress (I) and offered to support it in a coalition government but the offer was rejected.

Gogoi was described as a "long-term aspirant" for the office of chief minister, having previously been considered and speculated as a candidate in 1979, and in 1981. He claimed that if he was elected leader of the Assam Congress legislature party, he would be able to secure the support of the Plain Tribals Council of Assam (PTCA) and tea garden group, whom Taimur had previously allegedly antagonised. The party high command disagreed and advised him to develop a grassroots organisation before forming a government, but due to mounting opposition Taimur resigned as party leader on 9 January 1982.

==== Selection and appointment ====
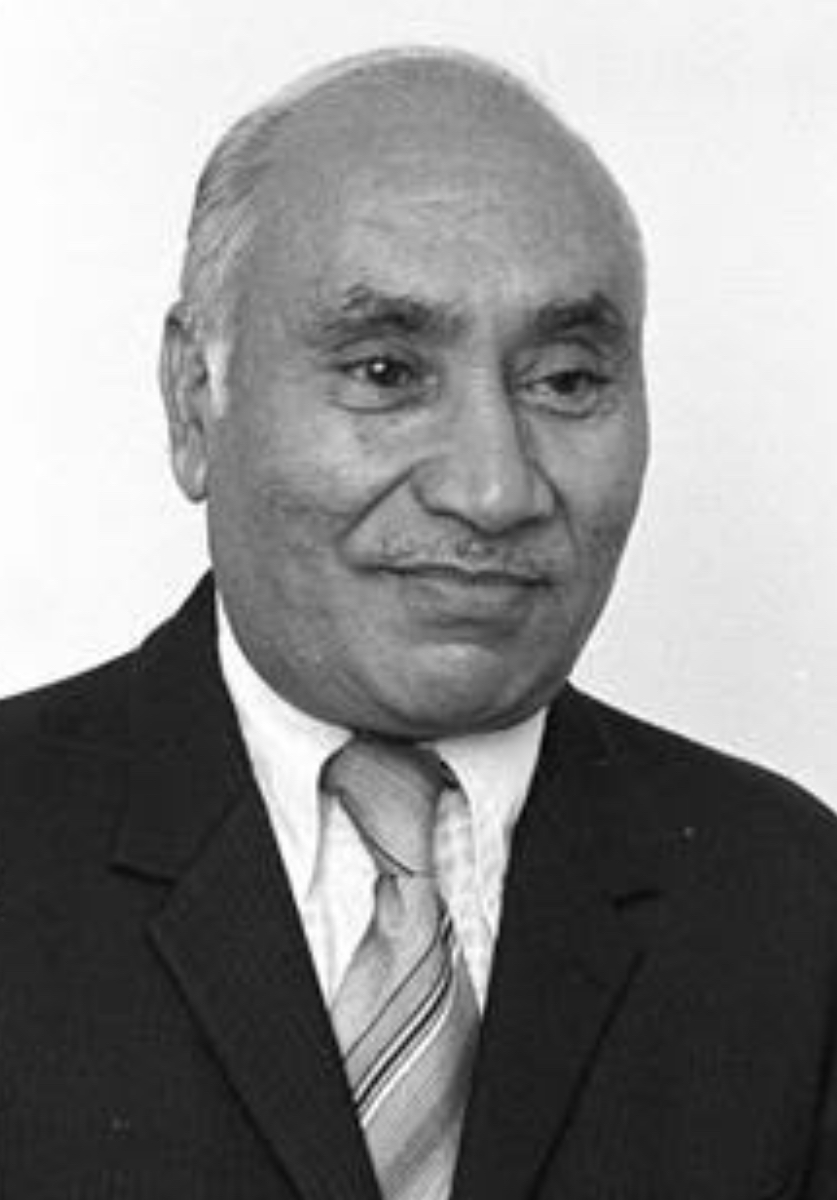
Prakash Mehrotra (pictured) appointed Gogoi as Chief Minister.

Taimur proposed Gogoi for the leadership, as did other potential leadership candidate Hiteswar Saikia. The Taimur camp had previously encouraged Saikia to contest Gogoi's claim, but an opinion poll before the final selection showed there were only eight backers of Saikia among the thirty-five Congress members assembled, while twenty-four supported Gogoi and three remained neutral. Just before his selection, four supporters of Taimur resigned from the party. Saikia dropped out of the race on health grounds. Economic and Political Weekly reported that the party high command had "finally opted" for Gogoi as he "appeared to be the most acceptable and least controversial choice". On 11 January, he was unanimously elected leader of the Assam Congress legislature party, with Congress (I) general secretary Rajendra Kumari Bajpai as the observer. Gogoi told the press on 12 January that he had backing of sixty-three out of one-hundred and twenty-five members of the Assembly, and submitted the list to the governor the same day. Gogoi was sworn in as chief minister of Assam by Mehrotra at Raj Bhavan on 13 January 1982, ending 197 days of president's rule in Assam.

In response to criticism of governor Mehrotra by the opposition over alleged partisanship in the appointment of Gogoi and bypassing of the appointment of an LDA government, Gogoi stated that "the governor has his own methods to assess the situation and I think he has been very fair." He was given six weeks by Mehrotra to convene the Assembly and prove he commanded a majority.

=== Cabinet ===
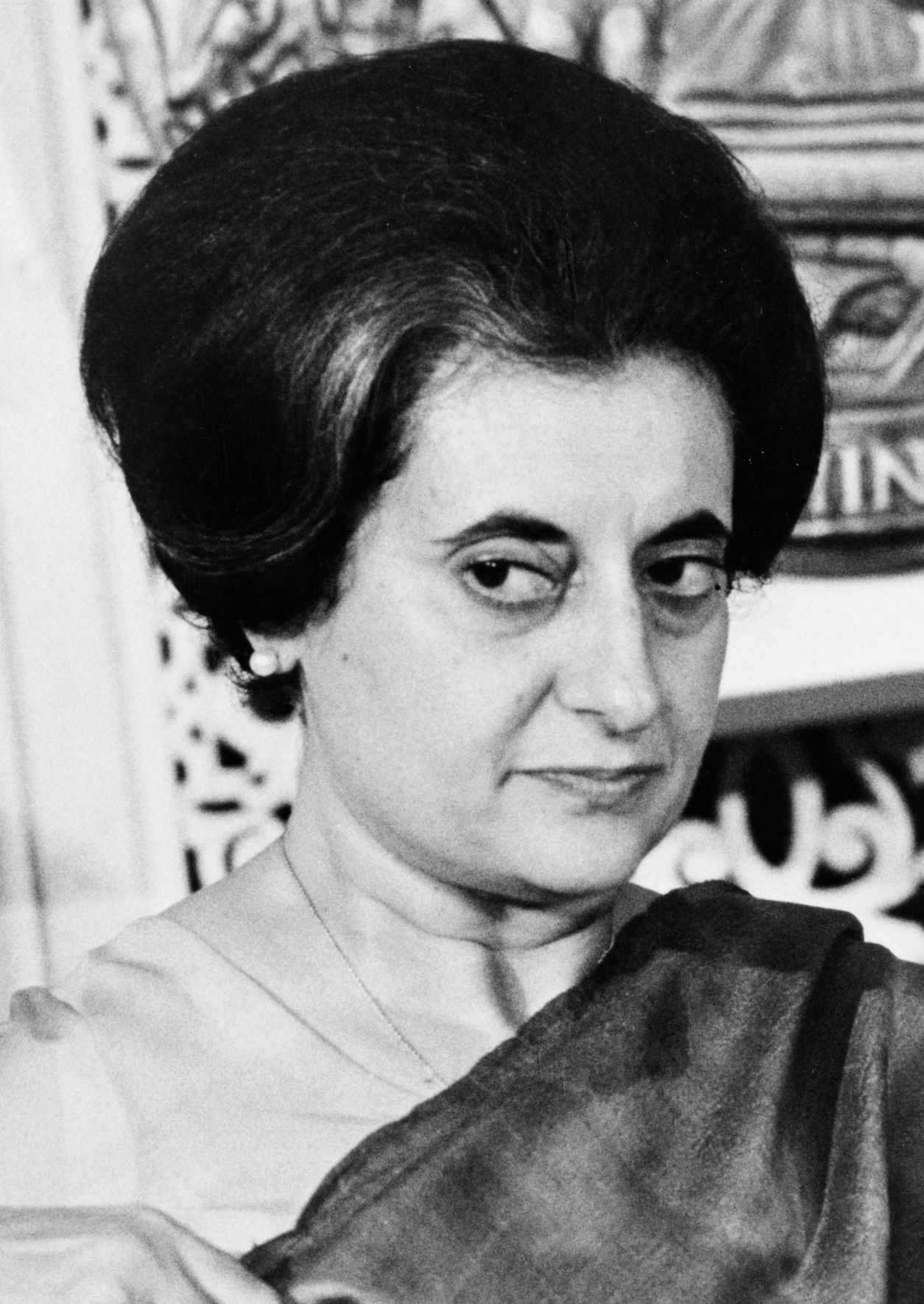
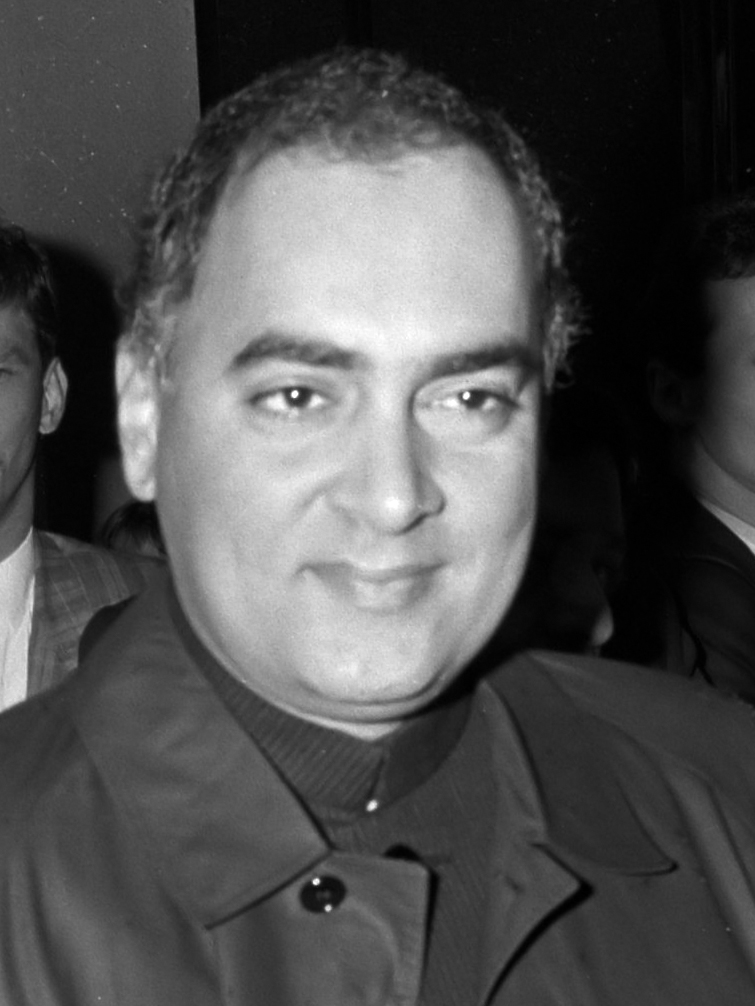
Gogoi travelled twice to Delhi to approve his cabinet with prime minister Indira Gandhi and Rajiv Gandhi (both pictured).

After his swearing-in, Gogoi travelled twice to Delhi to approve his cabinet minister lists with Indira Gandhi and Rajiv Gandhi. He began allocating portfolios to his cabinet on 23 January. Gogoi allocated himself the ministries of home, administration reforms, public relations, khadi and village industries, rural development, public works, tourism and all other departments not allocated. Gogoi appointed Mohammad Idris as his finance minister, and Janata MLA Rabindra Nath Choudhury as the irrigation, fisheries and scheduled castes and tribal welfare minister. Gogoi's former leadership rival Hiteswar Saikia was appointed education and cultural affairs minister, while Ramesh Chandra Saharia was given the portfolios of revenue and food. Altaf Hussain Mazumdar was appointed judicial and legislative affairs minister, and Santi Ranjan Das Gupta became the agriculture, town and country planning minister. Jagannath Singh, who had resigned along with Gogoi from the Borbora cabinet in 1979, was given the portfolios of industry and public enterprises, while former Taimur cabinet minister Golok Rajbanshi was appointed minister for power, mines, minerals and parliamentary affairs. Zahirul Islam was given municipal administration and community development. Gogoi additionally appointed two ministers of state, A. N. Akram Hussain and Padam Bahadur Chouhan, and one deputy minister, Mohammed Fokhrul Islam.

There were several changes to the Gogoi ministry. The first was when Sonaram Thaosen and Dhaniram Rongpi were sworn in as cabinet ministers on 30 January. They were included in Gogoi's initial cabinet list, but not allocated portfolios or sworn in until 30 January. The second change came with the death of revenue minister Ramesh Chandra Saharia on 8 February 1982. The final change was an expansion of his ministry on 8 March; Gogoi appointed Congress MLAs Ranendra Narayan Basumatari, Joy Chandra Nagbanshi, and Plain Tribals Council of Assam (PTCA) MLA Samar Brahma Choudhury, to cabinet. Kaliram Dekaraja and Aklius Tirkey were appointed ministers of state.

=== Tenure ===
==== Policies ====
After his appointment as chief minister, Gogoi announced that his government's policy would "not be very different from the previous government's", and stated that there would "be no reshuffle of officials". He also announced that his administration would prioritise "the solution of the foreigners issue and the maintenance of law and order", as well as the "implementation of the prime minister's 20-point programme." Following his appointment, Indira Gandhi expressed support for his chief ministership.

As chief minister, Gogoi emphasised the implementation of the National Rural Employment Scheme, and the 20-point programme launched by prime minister Indira Gandhi. His administration also undertook the release of senior ethnic Assamese police officials who had been arrested by the previous government under Anwara Taimur.

==== Assam agitation ====
Gogoi's tenure came amidst Assam agitation, a popular uprising demanding the deportation of foreigners, led by the All Assam Students Union (AASU) and All Assam Gana Sangram Parishad (AAGSP). He was generally considered soft towards the movement; under his chief ministership, there was relatively less use of force in the administration of Assam during the agitation period. Despite this, the installation of another Congress government was resented by the AASU and opposition parties, and a bandh call on 18 January 1982 caused a large response in the Brahmaputra valley. Shortly afterwards, on 26 January, a call was given to observe a "people's curfew" on Republic Day. As part of the "curfew", Republic Day functions were boycotted and people remained in their homes. Gogoi subsequently accused both the AASU and the AAGSP of "secessionist acts", and threatened to ban both organisations. He told a news conference in January that demonstrators had pulled down the Indian national flag at eighteen different locations and harassed numerous people as part of the "curfew" protest. The AASU denied Gogoi's "secessionist" label against them.

=== Instability and resignation ===
==== Legislative support ====
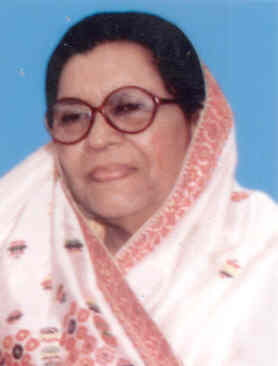
Anwara Taimur (pictured) began to oppose Gogoi's leadership.

After Gogoi was appointed chief minister, he consistently faced instability in his government, especially due to internal conflicts within the party. Taimur was described as "virtually leading a revolt against him"; in order to keep up with her, Gogoi turned to opposition MLAs for support. The foreigners issue also began to cause dissatisfaction in Gogoi's leadership within his party. He initiated a process to identify muslims who might have crossed from Bangladesh into Assam between 1961 and 1971. This created dissent amongst muslims in the party, including Golam Osmani and Afzalur Rahman, who left the party, reducing the strength of Congress (I) in the assembly.

Mehrotra eventually reversed his decision on making a government have to face the assembly quickly to prove its majority, but the budget session was due. In the time leading up to the first assembly meeting, Gogoi reportedly found it "tough", and struggled in his attempts to keep maintaining the support of opposition MLAs. On the day before the assembly session on 14 March 1982, which was meeting after a year, there were disagreements over the level of support in the legislature between Congress (I) and the LDA. Gogoi claimed the support of 62 MLAs, while the LDA claimed the support of 63.

==== Resignation ====
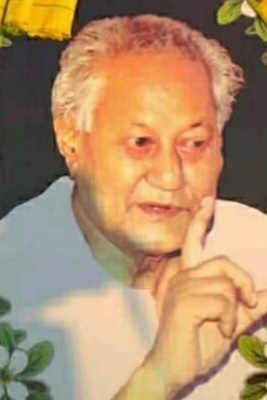
Gogoi wanted to prevent opposition leader Sarat Chandra Sinha (pictured) from forming a government.

Due to the conflicting claims over levels of support in the assembly, the LDA moved a motion of no confidence against 65-day-old Gogoi ministry on 17 March. The censure motion was moved against Gogoi jointly by opposition leader Sarat Chandra Sinha, Golap Borbora, Hemen Das, Promode Gogoi, Zainal Abedin, Premadhar Bora and Ramesh Mohan Kouli. The speaker, Sheikh Chand Mohammad, admitted the motion and fixed the discussion for 18 March. After realising he failed to secure the required numbers to survive the motion, Gogoi tendered in his resignation to the governor, and the speaker then adjourned the house sine die.

A new government may have been formed by the LDA after the resignation of Gogoi, but he advised the governor to dissolve the assembly. When asked about this recommendation, he stated "I had no other alternative. If I did not make such a recommendation then the governor would have had no other alternative but to allow the opposition to form a ministry." He also expressed sadness over the decision, saying that he felt sorry for the members of his party who had "suddenly become ordinary people". On 19 March, president Neelam Sanjiva Reddy issued a proclamation which dissolved the legislative assembly and brought the state under president's rule.

=== Assessment ===
Gogoi himself attributed the downfall of his ministry to Taimur. After the ministry collapsed, Gogoi stated "the ministry would not have toppled if Taimur had not worked against me. Just when five Janata MLAs were about to support me, Taimur stepped up her fight against me and they became shy as they could not support somebody who faced so much opposition within his own party."

Bhawani Singh assessed in 1984 that Gogoi's minority ministry (and also Taimur's) "needed external props to survive" which "sharpened the strife and tension" in the state, but that Gogoi (differing to Taimur) "made good his exit" from the chief ministership. Babulal Fadia asserted that Gogoi may have had a longer tenure as chief minister had the budget session not been due.

== Post-Chief Ministership ==
=== Career under Saikia (1983–1991) ===
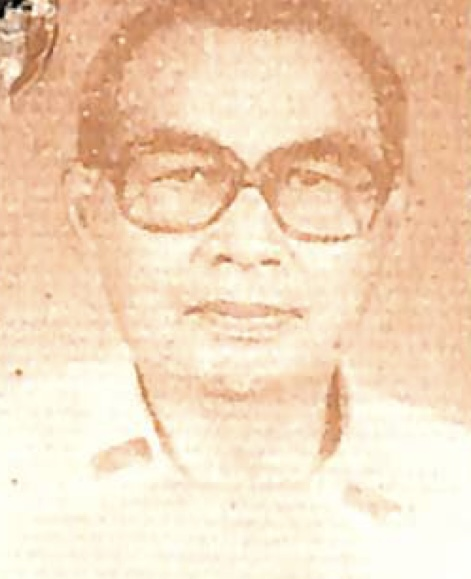
Official assembly portrait, c. 1985

In the 1983 Assam Legislative Assembly election, he was reelected, polling 4,905 votes as the Congress candidate in Dibrugarh. He was the revenue and industries minister and later the Public Works Department (PWD) minister in the Hiteswar Saikia cabinet from 1983 to 1985. As PWD minister, he led the dissidents in the Saikia cabinet over the delay in the setting up of tribunals for illegal immigrants who had entered Assam, which Gogoi reportedly made political "capital" from.

In the 1985 Assam Legislative Assembly election, Gogoi won 24,100 votes, 44.87% of the total vote and he was reelected in Dibrugarh, defeating his nearest opponent by 4,055 votes. In the 1991 election, he obtained 20,278 votes, 42.38% of the total vote. He was reelected with a majority of 9,070 votes. He was made minister for Planning and Development in the second Hiteswar Saikia ministry on 30 June 1991.

=== Final political years (1991–1996) ===
Following the kidnapping of fourteen officials by the United Liberation Front of Asom (ULFA) in July 1991, the government under Saikia launched operation rhino to rescue the hostages. Saikia's actions drew criticism from Gogoi and caused conflict between the two, which led to Gogoi publicly criticising Saikia's handling of the hostage crisis on 2 October 1991. The issue caused Gogoi to grow increasingly frustrated with Saikia's leadership. He went on to heavily criticise Saikia, stating that Saikia had a "dictatorial style of functioning" and "short-sighted policies" to tackle ULFA. Gogoi further alleged that all cabinet ministers, except for a few favoured by the chief minister, were being "deliberately sidelined" by Saikia and that he had "virtually usurped all powers".

On 18 October 1991, Gogoi moved from his position as planning and development minister, and was instead given charge of Public Enterprises. On 27 November, Saikia dismissed Gogoi from the cabinet for "anti-party activities".

Gogoi was expelled from the Indian National Congress (INC) on 3 March 1995 for alleged anti-party activities for a period of 6 years. He remained MLA for Dibrugarh until 1996, where he sought reelection as the All India Indira Congress (tiwari) candidate but finished fourth in the election, losing his seat to INC candidate Kalyan Kumar Gogoi.

== Electoral history ==
Year	Constituency	Party	Votes	%	Opponent		Result	Margin
1978	Dibrugarh	JP	22,003	57.84%	Lakshi Prasad Dutta	INC	Won	11,930
1983	Dibrugarh	INC	4,905	91.96%	Ramesh Chandra Barooah	IC(S)	Won	4,651
1985	Dibrugarh	INC	24,100	44.87%	Ananta Handique	IND	Won	4,055
1991	Dibrugarh	INC	20,278	42.38%	Bhaskar Bora	AGP	Won	9,070
1996	Dibrugarh	AIIC(T)	3,863	6.98%	Kalyan Kumar Gogoi	INC	Lost	18,660

== Personal life ==
=== Activities, religion and interests ===
Gogoi was an Assamese Hindu, and resided in Khalihamari, Dibrugarh.

In several of his Who's Who profiles at the state legislature throughout his career, Gogoi listed some of his hobbies and interests as indoor games, social work, playing badminton, reading books, gardening and cultivation. He also listed one of his social activities as being the president of the District Bar Association.

=== Marriage and family ===
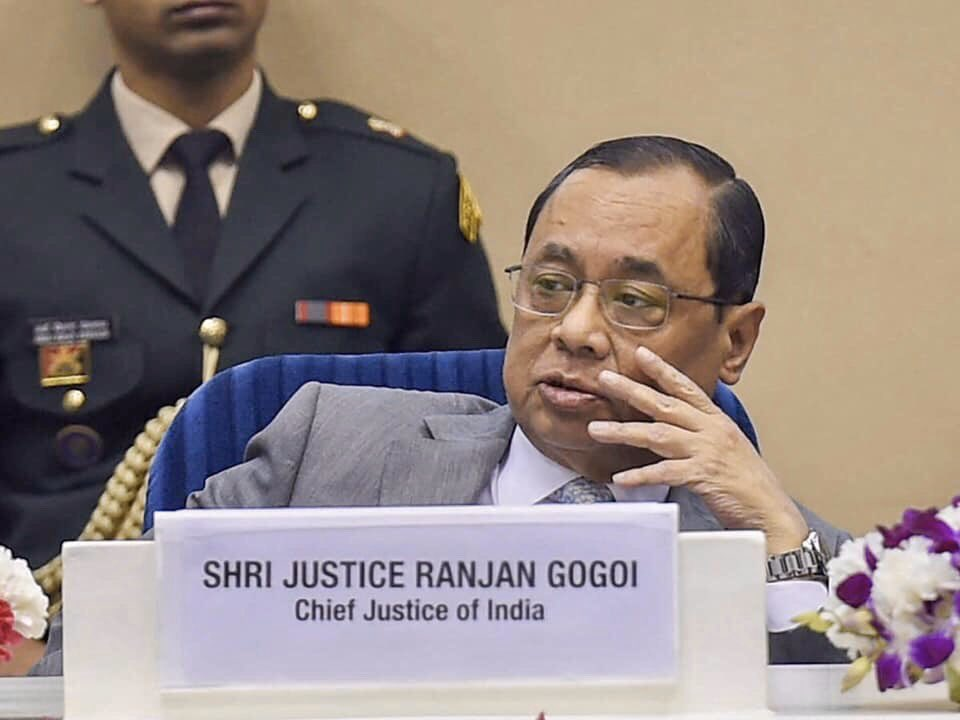
Gogoi's second son Ranjan (pictured) became the 46th Chief Justice of India

He married Smt Shanti Priya Gogoi (née Gohain; 30 August 1934 – 9 April 2021) in 1951, and they had five children: Anjan Gogoi, Ranjan Gogoi, Nirjan Gogoi, Indira Gogoi and Nandita Hazarika. Shanti Gogoi was the daughter of Jogesh Chandra Gohain and Padma Kumari Gohain, both of whom were politicians. Padma Kumari Gohain was the member of the Assam Legislative Assembly for Moran and was a minister in the Bimala Prasad Chaliha and Mahendra Mohan Choudhury cabinets.

Gogoi's eldest son, Anjan Gogoi, served as an Air Marshal in the Indian Air Force (IAF). His second son, Ranjan Gogoi, was the 46th chief justice of the Supreme Court of India and later was appointed a member of the Rajya Sabha. His youngest son, Nirjan, became a consultant urologist in the United Kingdom, and his two daughters, Indira and Nandita, served as members of the Assam civil service.

During the childhood of his two elder sons, both Anjan and Ranjan wished to attend the Sainik School in Goalpara, but Keshab Gogoi said that only one could go. As both brothers wanted to go, Keshab Gogoi told them to decide via a coin toss. Anjan won the coin toss, and went to the Sainik School in 1964, which culminated in his IAF career. Ranjan attended Don Bosco school in Dibrugarh and later studied at St. Stephen's College, Delhi, before later pursuing a legal career.

In 1982, when the future law minister Abdul Muhib Mazumder asked Keshab Gogoi if his son, Ranjan, would become a politician like him, Gogoi replied that Ranjan would not emulate him, but had the potential to become Chief Justice of India (CJI). Over four decades later, Ranjan became the CJI in October 2018, the first holder of the office from Northeast India.

== Death ==
Keshab Chandra Gogoi died on 5 August 1998 in Dibrugarh, at the age of 71. He was survived by his wife, children and grandchildren. His widow, Shanti Gogoi, survived him by over two decades, before dying in April 2021.

== In popular culture ==
Keshab Chandra Gogoi was referenced in the 1-crore question on the Indian game show Kaun Banega Crorepati in 2019; the answer of the question was Ranjan Gogoi. The question was: the father of which Chief Justice of India was once a Chief Minister of an Indian state?

== See also ==
- Political families of Assam
- List of chief ministers from the Indian National Congress
