= Second Saikia ministry =

Government of Assam, India (1991–1996)

- Date formed: 30 June 1991
- Date dissolved: 22 April 1996

People and organisations
- Governor: Lokanath Misra
- Chief Minister: Hiteswar Saikia
- Member party: INC
- Status in legislature: Majority 66 / 126 (52%)
- Opposition party: Asom Gana Parishad

History
- Election: 1991
- Legislature term: 5 years
- Predecessor: President's rule
- Successor: Barman Ministry

The Second Ministry of Hiteswar Saikia was the Cabinet of Assam headed by Chief Minister of Assam Hiteswar Saikia that was formed after the 1991 Assam Legislative Assembly election. The 36 member Congress ministry included 21 Cabinet Ministers and 15 Ministers of State. The election was held between 6 and 8 June 1991 and this led to the formation of the 9th Assam Legislative Assembly. Saikia was sworn in as Chief Minister on 30 June 1991 by Governor Lokanath Misra. The ministry was dissolved following the death of Chief Minister Hiteswar Saikia on 22 April 1996.

== Ministers ==
Name	Constituency	Portfolio	Party
Hiteswar Saikia; Chief Minister	Nazira	Chief Minister	INC
Cabinet Ministers
Keshab Chandra Gogoi	Dibrugarh	Planning; Development	INC
Anwara Taimur	Dalgaon	Agriculture; Tourism	INC
Golok Rajbanshi	Rangapara	PWD; Parliamentary Affairs	INC
Mukut Sharma	Nowgong	Revenue; Land reforms	INC
Gobinda Chandra Langthasa	Haflong	Deputy Chief Minister; Hills area development (HAD); Hill plan; Registration; Stamps; Health; Family welfare	INC
Zahirul Islam	Mankachar	Irrigation	INC
Bijit Saikia	Tezpur	Industries	INC
Afzalur Rahman	Jaleswar	Panchayat; Community Development	INC
S. S. Ojha	Tinsukia	Transport; Khadi; Village industries	INC
Dileswar Tanti	Doom Dooma	Labour	INC
Bargaram Deuri	Bihpuria	Welfare of plain tribes, Scheduled Castes and other backward communities; Sericulture; Weaving	INC
Nakul Das	Mangaldoi	Veterinary	INC
Nagen Neog	Golgahat	Cooperation; Border Areas Development	INC
Kulbahadur Chetri	Margherita	Social Welfare	INC
Silvius Condpan	Majbat	Employment; Fisheries	INC
Haren Bhumij	Lahowal	Flood control; Science and Technology; Environment	INC
Dinesh Prasad Goala	Lakhipur	Power	INC
Bhumidhar Barman	Barkhetry	Education	INC
Ardhendu Kumar Dey	Hojai	Food; Civil supplies	INC
Devanand Konwar	Thowra	Law; Municipal Administration	INC
Ministers of State
Abu Saleh Najmuddin	Badarpur	Home; Health; Education	INC
Gomeswar Pegu	Jonai	Revenue	INC
Ismail Hussain	Barpeta	Agriculture	INC
Boloram Nag	Kaliabor	Labour	INC
Indra Gogoi	Lakhimpur	Flood control; Youth; Sports	INC
Gautam Roy	Katlicherra	Panchayat; Community Development; Rural Development	INC
Jagat Patgiri	Dudhnai	Welfare of Plain Tribals; Sericulture; Weaving	INC
Anwar Hussain	Bilasipara East	Planning; Development; Finance	INC
Debesh Chakraborty	Lumding	Relief; Rehabilitation; Social welfare	INC
Mohibul Haque	Dhubri	Border area; Power; Rural electrification	INC
Sarat Barkotoky	Sonari	PWD; Printing; Secondary education	INC
Gopi Das	Boko	Forests and Fisheries	INC
Chittaranjan Patowary	Gauhati East	Transport	INC
Nurul Hussain	Samaguri	Cooperation	INC
Gautam Bora	Batadroba	Health; Family Welfare	INC
Rashidul Haque	Rupohihat	Minority affairs; Veterinary	INC

=== Changes ===
- On 18 October 1991, Planning and Development Minister Kesab Chandra Gogoi was given charge of Public Enterprise while Law Minister Shri Devanand Konwar was given the additional charge of Power, Planning and Development.
- On 25 November 1991, Minister of State for Transport Chittaranjan Patowary was dismissed. On 27 November, Minister for Public Enterprises Kesab Chandra Gogoi was dismissed for alleged anti-party activities.
- On 22 April 1995, the ministry was reshuffled, with no ministers being dismissed and no ministers being inducted. Golok Rajbanshi was divested of his portfolio and given power, non-convention energy, law whilst retaining parliamentary affairs. Mukut Sharma retained tourism and was given the additional portfolio of education. Devanand Konwar was divested of the law, power and municipal administration portfolios and given revenue and land reforms.
