= Ramesh Chandra Barooah =

Indian politician from Assam state

Speaker of Assam Legislative Assembly
- In office 22 March 1972 – 20 March 1978
- Deputy: Golok Rajbanshi
- Preceded by: Mahi Kanta Das
- Succeeded by: Jogendra Nath Hazarika

Minister for Supply, Excise, Trade and Commerce
- In office 11 November 1970 - 17 January 1972
- Chief Minister: Mahendra Mohan Choudhury

Cabinet Minister, Government of Assam
- In office 1967 - 1970
- Chief Minister: Bimala Prasad Chaliha

Member of Assam Legislative Assembly
- In office 1961 - 21 March 1978
- Preceded by: Nilmoni Barthakur
- Succeeded by: Keshab Chandra Gogoi
- Constituency: Dibrugarh

Personal details
- Born: 1 July 1912
- Died: Unknown
- Party: Indian National Congress
- Spouse: Purnima Barooah (m. 1945)
- Children: 4

Ramesh Chandra Barooah (1 July 1912- died) was an Indian politician from the state of Assam. He was a member of Assam Legislative Assembly for Dibrugarh. He was twice a cabinet minister, as well as becoming speaker of the assembly in 1972.

== Education and personal life ==
Barooah was educated at Dibrugarh, Gauhati and Calcutta. He had a B.L. He married Shrimati Purnima Barooah in 1945 and they had two sons and two daughters.

== Political career ==
Barooah was the Indian National Congress candidate for the newly created constituency of Dibrugarh in the 1957 Assam Legislative Assembly election. He received 6351 votes, losing to communist candidate Nilamoni Barthakur.

In 1961, there was a by-election in Dibrugarh. Barooah was again the Indian National Congress candidate for the constituency. He received 6522 votes, defeating Nilamoni Barthakur by 2550 votes.

In the 1962 Assam Legislative Assembly election, Barooah sought reelection in Dibrugarh. He received 11588 votes, defeating his nearest Communist opponent by 5150 votes.

In the 1967 Assam Legislative Assembly election, Barooah again sought reelection as the Indian National Congress candidate in Dibrugarh. He received 8480 votes, defeating his nearest opponent by 2532. In 1967, Chief Minister Bimala Prasad Chaliha constituted his ministry for the second time and Barooah was made a cabinet minister. He served until the end of the ministry. After Mahendra Mohan Choudhury formed his ministry, Barooah was made minister for Supply, Trade, Commerce and Excise and he served until the end of the ministry.

In the 1972 Assam Legislative Assembly election, Barooah sought reelection in Dibrugarh. He received 18669 votes, easily defeating his nearest opponent by 16143 votes. Barooah was appointed Speaker of Assam Legislative Assembly on 22 March 1972. During his tenure, he chaired the debate of the first, second and third motion of no-confidence against the ministry of Sarat Chandra Sinha.

Barooah did not seek reelection in the 1978 Assam Legislative Assembly election. The Congress candidate in the election was defeated by Janata Party candidate Keshab Chandra Gogoi, who later became Chief Minister of Assam.

Barooah was also Chairman (Governing Body) of Assam Medical College.

== Tributes ==
In 2017, Barooah’s 104th birth anniversary was observed. An art competition for school students was organized at Dibrugarh Government Higher Secondary and Multipurpose Girls’ School. The competition was inaugurated by Indeswar Khaund, who lit the traditional lamp and paid floral tributes to Barooah. Sarat Barkotoky gave a brief description on Barooah’s life, in the presence of Barooah’s family.

In 2019, the 107th birth anniversary of Barooah was celebrated in Dibrugarh. The ceremonial lamp was lit by his niece, Ila Dowerah.
