= Santi Ranjan Das Gupta =

Indian politician

Cabinet Minister, Government of Assam
- In office 13 January 1982 – 8 February 1982
- Chief Minister: Keshab Chandra Gogoi

Cabinet Minister, Government of Assam
- In office 9 September 1979 – 11 December 1979
- Chief Minister: Jogendra Nath Hazarika

Member of Assam Legislative Assembly
- In office 1985 – 1991
- Preceded by: Sadhan Ranjan Sarkar
- Succeeded by: Ardhendu Kumar Dey
- Constituency: Hojai
- In office 1978 – 1983
- Preceded by: Idris Ali Fakir
- Succeeded by: Sadhan Ranjan Sarkar
- Constituency: Hojai

Personal details
- Party: Independent; Janata Party

Santi Ranjan Das Gupta was an Indian politician from Assam who served as a cabinet minister in 1979 and in 1982. He was the Member of Assam Legislative Assembly (MLA) for Hojai from 1978 to 1983 and again from 1985 to 1991.

== Political career ==
Das Gupta was elected in MLA for Hojai for the Janata party at the 1978 election. He served as a cabinet minister under Jogendra Nath Hazarika and Keshab Chandra Gogoi. He was not a candidate in the 1983 election, but won as an independent candidate in the 1985 election.
