= Yarenjungla Longkumer =

Gauhati High Court judge

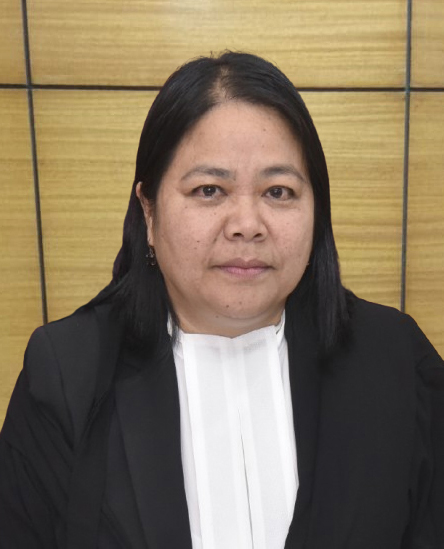

Additional Judge of the Gauhati High Court
- Incumbent
- Assumed office 17 February 2025
- Nominated by: D. Y. Chandrachud
- Appointed by: Droupadi Murmu

Personal details
- Born: 15 January 1968 Kohima, Nagaland.

Yarenjungla Longkumer is the first Naga woman to be elevated as a high court judge from Nagaland. She follows Golmei Gaiphulshillu Kabui, a former judicial officer who became the first Naga woman judge of the Manipur High Court from Manipur's tribal communities in 2023.

== Early life ==
Yarenjungla Longkumer was born on 15 January 1968 at Kohima. She completed her matriculation studies in 1983 from Little Flower School in the town. Thereafter, she obtained her BA (hons.) from Lady Shri Ram College in New Delhi in 1988. She completed her LLB from Campus Law Center under Delhi University in 1992 and enrolled in the Bar Council of Northeast India in November 1992.

== Career ==
=== Judicial officer ===
Longkumer was the top-ranked candidate recruited to Grade-I of the higher judiciary through an examination conducted by the Gauhati High Court in 2013. As a judicial officer she worked at the District and Session Court in Dimapur and Kohima, courts with highest case pendency. She served as the Registrar of the Kohima Bench of the Gauhati High Court and later appointed as the Secretary (Judicial) in the Law and Department of the Government of Nagaland.

=== Gauhati High Court judge ===
In May 2023, the Gauhati High Court collegium recommended her appointment as a high court judge to the Supreme Court of India. Thereafter, in January 2024, the members of its collegium, then consisting of Justices Dhananjaya Y. Chandrachud, Sanjiv Khanna, and Bhushan Ramkrishna Gavai, recommended her elevation to the Government of India. She was appointed as an additional judge of the Gauhati High Court on 17 February 2025 by the President of India. Her appointment remains for two years from the day she assumes the office. She is stationed at the Kohima Bench of the high court since then.
