= Rabindra Nath Choudhury =

Indian politician (born 1934)

Cabinet Minister, Government of Assam
- In office 13 January 1982 – 19 March 1982
- Chief Minister: Keshab Chandra Gogoi

Cabinet Minister, Government of Assam
- In office 9 September 1979 – 11 December 1979
- Chief Minister: Jogendra Nath Hazarika

Member of Assam Legislative Assembly
- In office 1978 – 1983
- Preceded by: Constituency established
- Succeeded by: Ratneswar Sarkar
- Constituency: Abhayapuri South

Personal details
- Born: 1 May 1934 (age 92)
- Party: Janata Party
- Other political affiliations: Independent
- Spouse: Nibrhani Choudhury
- Children: 5

Rabindra Nath Choudhury (born 1 May 1934) is an Indian politician and lawyer from Assam who served as a cabinet minister in 1979 and 1982. He was the Member of Assam Legislative Assembly (MLA) for Abhayapuri South from 1978 to 1983.

== Early life and career ==
Rabindra Nath Choudhury was born on 1 May 1934. He practised law at District Judges Court in Dhubri.

== Political career ==
Choudhury was elected in MLA for Abhayapuri South in 1978. He served as a cabinet minister under Jogendra Nath Hazarika and Keshab Chandra Gogoi. He stood as an independent in 1985 for the constituency but lost.

== Personal life ==
Choudhury married Nibrhani Choudhury and they had five children together.
