= Kalyan Kumar Gogoi =

Indian politician from Assam

Member of Assam Legislative Assembly
- In office 12 June 1996 – 19 May 2006
- Preceded by: Keshab Chandra Gogoi
- Succeeded by: Prasanta Phukan
- Constituency: Dibrugarh

Personal details
- Born: c.1944 Naharkatiya, Dibrugarh district, Assam
- Died: 30 September 2016 (aged 70) ABC Colony, Guwahati
- Party: Indian National Congress (1996-2016)
- Children: 3
- Parent: Moheswar Gogoi (father)
- Education: Dibrugarh Hanumanbax Surajmall Kanoi College
- Occupation: Politician

Kalyan Kumar Gogoi (c. 1944- 30 September 2016) was an Indian politician from the state of Assam. He was a former member of Assam Legislative Assembly for Dibrugarh. He was a member of the Indian National Congress from 1996. He was a dentist before his entry to politics.

== Early life and education ==
Gogoi was born in 1944 in Naharkatiya to the late Moheswar Gogoi. Gogoi was an alumnus of Dibrugarh Hanumanbax Surajmall Kanoi College. He obtained his degree in Dental Medicine from Dr R Ahmed Dental College, Kolkata.

== Political career ==
Gogoi joined Indian National Congress in 1996. He was the Indian National Congress candidate for Dibrugarh in the 1996 Assam Legislative Assembly election. He received 22523 votes, 40.72% of the total vote. He defeated his nearest opponent, an AGP candidate, by 5992 votes. He also defeated the incumbent MLA of Dibrugarh and former Chief Minister of Assam Keshab Chandra Gogoi who came 4th in the election.

In the 2001 Assam Legislative Assembly election, Gogoi sought reelection in Dibrugarh. He received 40675 votes, 67.57% of the total vote, defeating his nearest opponent by 25961 votes.

In the 2006 Assam Legislative Assembly election, Gogoi sought reelection in Dibrugarh. He received 28249 votes, losing to BJP candidate and the current MLA of Dibrugarh, Prasanta Phukan.

In the 2011 Assam Legislative Assembly election, Gogoi was again the Indian National Congress candidate for Dibrugarh. He received 26897 votes, 31.9% of the total vote, coming second to Prasanta Phukan by 19609 votes.

== Personal life and death ==
Gogoi and his wife had 3 daughters. He continued his social activities until his death.

Gogoi died at 12.45 AM on 30 September 2016, after suffering a massive heart attack. He died at his residence in ABC Colony, Guwahati and was survived by his wife, 3 daughters, sons in law, grandchildren and admirers. He died the same day as former minister and former Moran MLA Joy Chandra Nagbanshi. Assam Pradesh Congress Committee President, Ripun Bora, offered his condolences on twitter. His body was carried to his residence in Seujpur, Dibrugarh for his last rites.
