= 1991 Assam Legislative Assembly election =

Legislative Assembly election in Assam, India

- 6 and 8 June 1991

126 seats in the Assam Legislative Assembly 64 seats needed for a majority
- Registered: 11,892,170
- Turnout: 74.67%
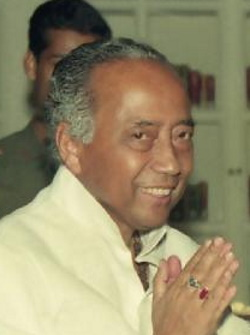

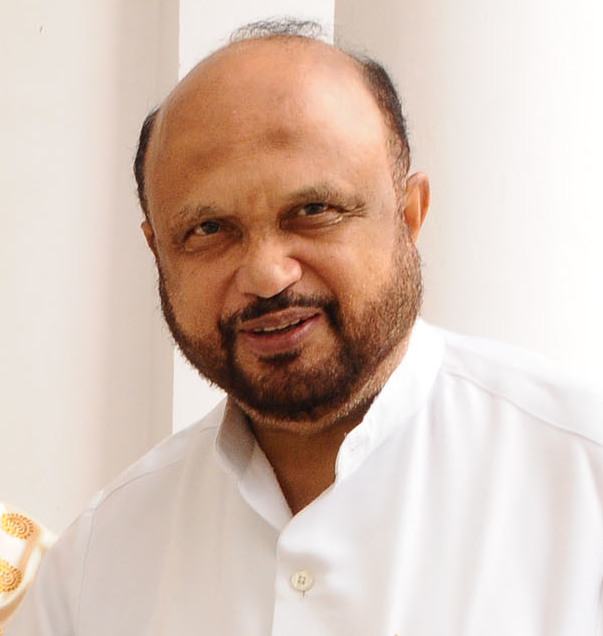
	Majority party	Minority party
Leader	Hiteswar Saikia	Prafulla Kumar Mahanta
Party	INC	AGP
Seats before	26	92
Seats won	66	19
Seat change	▲40	▼73
Popular vote	29.35%	17.93%
CM before election
President's Rule
Elected CM
Hiteswar Saikia
INC

Elections to the Assam Legislative Assembly were held in June 1991 to elect members of 126 constituencies in Assam, India. The Indian National Congress won the popular vote and a majority of seats and Hiteswar Saikia was appointed as the Chief Minister of Assam for his second term. The number of constituencies was set as 126, by the recommendation of the Delimitation Commission of India.

== Background ==
The Asom Gana Parishad was a constituent member of the Third Front Union Government of India formed in 1989. However, the Assam state executive headed by the Asom Gana Parishad was subsequently dismissed by the Government of India. President's rule was imposed in the state and the Indian Army was tasked with executing Operation Bajrang against the United Liberation Front of Assam.

The elections were fought amidst tense ethnic and sectarian relations. An unnamed legislator associated with the Asom Gana Parishad declared before the elections that:

The electorate in Assam will, however, keep a sharp eye on AGP's stand on the foreigners issue — so far its silence over this vexed problem was understandable. The stigma of fouling up the Indian Constitution. As a consequence thereof, they cannot talk of scrapping the part of the Assam accord. But the issue cannot be left hanging either. The immigrant vote bank is a treasure chest for any political party. The AGP can ill afford to disregard it. It is here that the BJP factor once again comes to the fore. The BJP has made the problem even more complex. It has sought to divide the immigrants into two clear cut sections strictly on religious grounds. The non-Muslims immigrating into India which mainly includes the Hindus and of course the Chakmas, are termed as refugees and are to be given shelter here. On the other hand, the Muslim immigrants are deemed as aliens and are to be detected and deported. This typical stand of the BJP makes little sense and in all likelihood it fails to make any impact on the electorate in Assam. However, there is another face of it. Reports of fundamentalism gaining ground in Assam and in the forthcoming hustings forces of pan-Islamic groups and those subscribing to Hindutva might play dominant roles. Though examples of anything communal making impact on the Assamese are rare, the time has come for the law enforcing authorities to expect the best but prepare for the worst. Prospects of the BJP improving the position in the Barak Valley are bright. There, of course, the question of the Bengali Hindus asserting their right for the sake of their identity is at stake. The Nepalis as well as the Chakmas coming to India in search of greener pastures, have added another dimensions to this festering problem. The peculiar stand of the government of Assam vis-à-vis the infiltration issue is diabolic to say the least. While the surrounding states have pushed the Chakmas out of their borders, all of them have taken refuge in Assam. Steps have been taken to deport them in batches to Bangladesh, but still many of them remain. Some of them even refuse to return to Bangladesh for fear of persecution from the illegal settlers there. Unless things are really sorted out in Bangladesh and also in Nepal the foreigners issue will surely remain a potential area for the political parties to make fresh forays. To sum up, the Assembly elections in Assam will be one of the most explosive ones in recent years. The strength of the opposition parties vis-à-vis the ruling Congress (I) will mark a new point in the state politics. Even the viability of the regional parties will be on test. Though the Left parties are trying to form a united front against the Congress but nothing concrete has yet emanated.

== Result ==
Party	Votes	%	Seats	+/–
Indian National Congress	2,455,302	29.35	66	▲41
Asom Gana Parishad	1,499,911	17.93	19	New
Bharatiya Janata Party	548,271	6.55	10	New
Natun Asom Gana Parishad	456,209	5.45	5	New
Janata Dal	398,623	4.77	1	New
Communist Party of India (Marxist)	321,926	3.85	2	0
Communist Party of India	206,541	2.47	4	▲4
Autonomous State Demand Committee	133,280	1.59	4	New
Indian Congress (Socialist) – Sarat Chandra Sinha	120,927	1.45	0	▼4
United Reservation Movement Council of Assam	109,578	1.31	0	New
United Minorities Front	108,620	1.30	0	New
Plain Tribals Council of Assam	88,496	1.06	0	New
Others	126,062	1.51	0	0
Independent	1,791,086	21.41	15	▼77
Total	8,364,832	100.00	126	0
Valid votes	8,364,832	94.33		
Invalid/blank votes	502,807	5.67		
Total votes	8,867,639	100.00		
Registered voters/turnout	11,892,170	74.57		
Source: ECI

== Elected members ==
Constituency	Reserved for (SC/ST/None)	Member	Party
Ratabari	SC	Ram Payare Rabidas	Bharatiya Janata Party
Patharkandi	None	Madhusudan Tewari	Bharatiya Janata Party
Karimganj North	None	Mission Ranjan Das	Bharatiya Janata Party
Karimganj South	None	Pranab Kumar Nath	Bharatiya Janata Party
Badarpur	None	Abu Saleh Najmuddin	Indian National Congress
Hailakandi	None	Chittendra Nath Mazumder	Bharatiya Janata Party
Katlicherra	None	Gautam Roy	Indian National Congress
Algapur	None	Sahidul Alam Chodhary	Asom Gana Parishad
Silchar	None	Samarendra Nath Sen	Bharatiya Janata Party
Sonai	None	Badrinarayan Singh	Bharatiya Janata Party
Dholai	SC	Parimal Suklabaidya	Bharatiya Janata Party
Udharbond	None	Jagannath Singh	Indian National Congress
Lakhipur	None	Dinesh Prasad Goala	Indian National Congress
Barkhola	None	Abdul Matin Mazumdar	Janata Dal
Katigora	None	Kali Ranjan Deb	Bharatiya Janata Party
Haflong	ST	Gobinda Chandra Langthasa	Indian National Congress
Bokajan	ST	Monsing Rongpi	Autonomous State Demand Committee
Howraghat	ST	Babu Rongpi	Autonomous State Demand Committee
Diphu	ST	Dipendra Rongpi	Autonomous State Demand Committee
Baithalangso	ST	Holiram Terang	Autonomous State Demand Committee
Mankachar	None	Zahirul Islam	Indian National Congress
Salmara South	None	Dewan Joynal Abedin	Independent
Dhubri	None	Dhruba Kumar Sen	Bharatiya Janata Party
Gauripur	None	Md. Mohidul Haque	Indian National Congress
Golakganj	None	Alauddin Sarkar	Communist Party of India
Bilasipara West	None	Giasuddin Ahmed	Communist Party of India
Bilasipara East	None	Anowar Hussin	Indian National Congress
Gossaigaon	None	Tajendra Narzary	Independent
Kokrajhar West	ST	Parameswar Brahma	Independent
Kokrajhar East	ST	Pramila Rani Brahma	Independent
Sidli	ST	Khiren Borgoyary	Independent
Bongaigaon	None	Phani Bhusan Choudhury	Asom Gana Parishad
Bijni	None	Kamal Brahma	Independent
Abhayapuri North	None	Bhupen Roy	Asom Gana Parishad
Abhayapuri South	SC	Chandan Kumar Sarkar	Indian National Congress
Dudhnai	ST	Jagat Patgiri	Indian National Congress
Goalpara East	None	Ratneshwar Das	Indian National Congress
Goalpara West	None	Nazmul Hoque	Independent
Jaleswar	None	Afzalur Rahman	Indian National Congress
Sorbhog	None	Samsul Hoque	Indian National Congress
Bhabanipur	None	Milan Boro	Independent
Patacharkuchi	None	Krishna Kanta Lahkar	Independent
Barpeta	None	Ismail Hussain	Indian National Congress
Jania	None	Asahaque Ali	Independent
Baghbar	None	Dildar Rezza	Indian National Congress
Sarukhetri	None	Nizamuddin Khan	Communist Party of India
Chenga	None	Liakat Ali Khan	Independent
Boko	SC	Gopinath Das	Indian National Congress
Chaygaon	None	Kamala Kalita	Asom Gana Parishad
Palasbari	None	Jatin Mali	Asom Gana Parishad
Jalukbari	None	Bhrigu Kumar Phukan	Natun Asom Gana Parishad
Dispur	None	Atul Bora	Asom Gana Parishad
Gauhati East	None	Chitta Ranjan Patowari	Indian National Congress
Gauhati West	None	Ramendra Narayan Kalita	Natun Asom Gana Parishad
Hajo	None	Badan Baruah	Natun Asom Gana Parishad
Kamalpur	None	Hiteswar Deka	Natun Asom Gana Parishad
Rangiya	None	Thaneswar Baro	Asom Gana Parishad
Tamulpur	None	Derhagra Musha	Independent
Nalbari	None	Nagen Sarma	Asom Gana Parishad
Barkhetry	None	Bhumidhar Barman	Indian National Congress
Dharmapur	None	Chandra Mohan Patowary	Independent
Barama	ST	Pani Ram Rabha	Natun Asom Gana Parishad
Chapaguri	ST	Suren Swargiary	Asom Gana Parishad
Panery	None	Karendra Basumatari	Independent
Kalaigaon	None	Jew Ram Boro	Independent
Sipajhar	None	Zoii Nath Sarmah	Asom Gana Parishad
Mangaldoi	SC	Nakul Chandra Das	Indian National Congress
Dalgaon	None	Anwara Taimur	Indian National Congress
Udalguri	ST	Jaman Singh Brahma	Indian National Congress
Majbat	None	Silvius Condpan	Indian National Congress
Dhekiajuli	None	Hiranya Bora	Indian National Congress
Barchalla	None	Rudra Parajuli	Indian National Congress
Tezpur	None	Bijit Saikia	Indian National Congress
Rangapara	None	Golok Rajbanshi	Indian National Congress
Sootea	None	Kushal Sahu	Indian National Congress
Biswanath	None	Nurjamal Sarkar	Indian National Congress
Behali	None	Barnabash Tantee	Indian National Congress
Gohpur	None	Kosheswar Barua	Indian National Congress
Jagiroad	SC	Bubul Das	Asom Gana Parishad
Marigaon	None	Munin Mahanta	Communist Party of India
Laharighat	None	Samsul Huda	Indian National Congress
Raha	SC	Gahin Chandra Das	Asom Gana Parishad
Dhing	None	Muzibar Rahman	Indian National Congress
Batadroba	None	Goutom Bora	Indian National Congress
Rupohihat	None	Rashidul Haque	Indian National Congress
Nowgong	None	Mukut Sarma	Indian National Congress
Barhampur	None	Prafulla Kumar Mahanta	Asom Gana Parishad
Samaguri	None	Nurul Hussain	Indian National Congress
Kaliabor	None	Boloram Nag	Indian National Congress
Jamunamukh	None	Abdul Jalil Ragibi	Indian National Congress
Hojai	None	Ardhendu Kumar Dey	Indian National Congress
Lumding	None	Debesh Ch. Chaakroborty	Indian National Congress
Bokakhat	None	Bhupen Bhuyan	Indian National Congress
Sarupathar	None	Binod Gowal	Asom Gana Parishad
Golaghat	None	Nagen Neog	Indian National Congress
Khumtai	None	Jiba Kanta Gogoi	Indian National Congress
Dergaon	SC	Hem Prakash Narayan	Indian National Congress
Jorhat	None	Hitendra Nath Goswami	Asom Gana Parishad
Majuli	ST	Padmeswar Doley	Asom Gana Parishad
Titabar	None	Mahendra Bora	Indian National Congress
Mariani	None	Rupam Kurmi	Indian National Congress
Teok	None	Renu Poma Rajkhowa	Asom Gana Parishad
Amguri	None	Anjan Dutta	Indian National Congress
Nazira	None	Hiteshwar Saikia	Indian National Congress
Mahmara	None	Lakhi Prasad Borgohain	Indian National Congress
Sonari	None	Sarat Barkotoky	Indian National Congress
Thowra	None	Devananda Konwar	Indian National Congress
Sibsagar	None	Promod Gogoi	Communist Party of India
Bihpuria	None	Borgaram Deori	Indian National Congress
Naoboicha	None	Moni Kumar Subba	Indian National Congress
Lakhimpur	None	Indra Gogoi	Indian National Congress
Dhakuakhana	ST	Bharat Chandra Narah	Asom Gana Parishad
Dhemaji	ST	Dilip Kumar Saikia	Asom Gana Parishad
Jonai	ST	Gomeswar Pegu	Indian National Congress
Moran	None	Joy Chandra Nagbanshi	Indian National Congress
Dibrugarh	None	Keshab Gogoi	Indian National Congress
Lahowal	None	Haren Bhumij	Indian National Congress
Duliajan	None	Aniya Gogoi	Indian National Congress
Tingkhong	None	Prithibi Majhi	Indian National Congress
Naharkatia	None	Sasha Kamal Handique	Communist Party of India
Chabua	None	Upendra Sanatan	Indian National Congress
Tinsukia	None	Shio Sambhu Ojha	Indian National Congress
Digboi	None	Rameswar Dhanowar	Indian National Congress
Margherita	None	Kulbahadur Chetri	Indian National Congress
Doom Dooma	None	Dileswar Tanti	Indian National Congress
Sadiya	None	Debendra Nath Baruah	Indian National Congress

== See also ==
- List of constituencies of the Assam Legislative Assembly
- 1991 elections in India
