= Maniram Dewan-Piyali Barua Flyover =

Maniram Dewan-Piyali Barua Flyover, also known as AT Road Flyover, is a 1.27-kilometre long flyover in Jorhat, Assam, India. It is the third and currently the longest flyover in the city of Jorhat, built above the AT Road and connects Baruah Chariali with Bhogdoi Bridge. The flyover aims to address the issue of traffic congestion at AT Road and improve the connectivity between the eastern and western parts of the city. The flyover was inaugurated on 11 March 2026 by the Chief Minister of Assam Himanta Biswa Sarma.

== History ==
The construction of the flyover was announced in December 2022 by the Chief Minister of Assam Himanta Biswa Sarma due to the concerns raised regarding the rising traffic in the city of Jorhat. The estimated cost for the construction of the flyover was 150 crores, although by the time of completion the cost escalated to 178 crores.
