= Padam Bahadur Chouhan =

Indian politician (born 1948)

Minister of State for Animal Husbandry, Veterinary, Panchayat and Community Development
- In office 28 February 1983 – 23 December 1985
- Chief Minister: Hiteswar Saikia

Minister of State for Transport and Tourism
- In office 23 January 1982 – 19 March 1982
- Chief Minister: Keshab Chandra Gogoi

Member of Assam Legislative Assembly
- In office 1978–1985
- Preceded by: Ambarish Lahari
- Succeeded by: Bhaben Narji
- Constituency: Tamulpur

Personal details
- Born: 23 October 1948 (age 77)
- Party: Indian National Congress; Janata Party
- Spouse: Radhika Chouhan
- Children: 2
- Occupation: Politician

Padam Bahadur Chouhan (born 23 October 1948) is an Indian politician from the state of Assam who served as a Minister of State in 1982 and from 1983 to 1985, and was Member of Assam Legislative Assembly (MLA) for Tamulpur from 1978 to 1985.

== Early and personal life ==
Chouhan was born on 23 October 1948. He married Radhika Chouhan, and they had two children.

== Political career ==
Chouhan was appointed Minister of State for Transport and Tourism under Keshab Chandra Gogoi in 1982. He was elected the MLA for Tamulpur in 1978 for the Janata Party, and then for Congress in 1983. He then became Minister of State for Animal Husbandry, Veterinary, Panchayat and Community Development under Hiteswar Saikia.
