= Mohammed Fokhrul Islam =

Indian politician (born 1939)

Deputy Minister of Education
- In office 23 January 1982 – 19 March 1982
- Chief Minister: Keshab Chandra Gogoi

Member of Assam Legislative Assembly
- In office 1978–1983
- Preceded by: Biswanath Upadhyaya
- Succeeded by: Moin Uddin
- Constituency: Patharkandi

Personal details
- Born: 1 October 1939 (age 86)
- Party: Independent
- Spouse: Meherunnesa Laskar
- Children: 3
- Occupation: Politician

Mohammed Fokhrul Islam (born 1 October 1939) is an Indian politician and teacher from the state of Assam who served as Deputy Minister of Education in 1982 and Member of Assam Legislative Assembly (MLA) for Patharkandi from 1978 to 1983.

== Early and personal life ==
Islam was born on 1 October 1939. He married Meherunnesa Laskar, and they had two sons and one daughter.

== Career ==
Islam became a teacher in 1959 for the Silchar government. He was elected the MLA for Patharkandi in 1978 as an independent. Islam was appointed Deputy Minister of Education under Keshab Chandra Gogoi in 1982.
