= Thaneswar Boro =

Indian politician (1938/1939–2024)

Thaneswar Boro (1938/1939 – 17 May 2024) was an Indian Asom Gana Parishad politician from Assam. Boro was elected to the Assam Legislative Assembly from Rangiya. He was a former President of Asom Gana Parishad. He was a Cabinet Minister in the First Mahanta ministry. In 2016, he founded a new political outfit called Asom Gana Parishad (Anchalik). Boro died from heart disease on 17 May 2024, at the age of 85.
