= Prasanta Phukan =

Indian politician

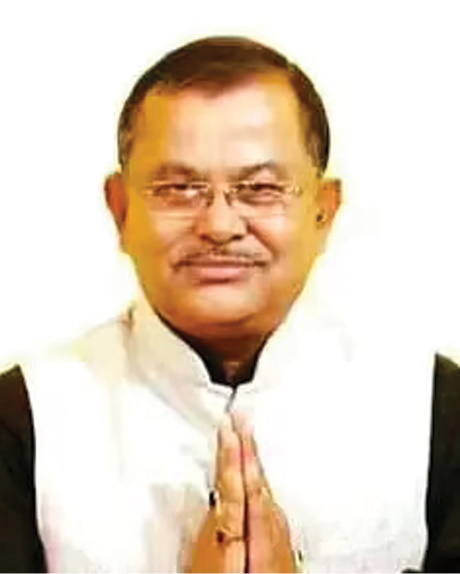

Cabinet Minister, Government of Assam
- Incumbent
- Assumed office 9 December 2024
- Chief Minister: Himanta Biswa Sarma
- Departments: Power; Skill, Employment and Entrepreneurship; Medical Education and Research (Ayushman Bharat)
- Preceded by: Nandita Garlosa (Power); Jayanta Malla Baruah (Skill)

Chairman, Assam Industries Development Corporation
- In office 3 November 2021 – 9 December 2024
- Succeeded by: Topon Kumar Gogoi

Member, Assam Legislative Assembly
- Incumbent
- Assumed office 2006
- Preceded by: Kalyan Kumar Gogoi
- Constituency: Dibrugarh

Personal details
- Born: 23 July 1954 (age 71) Dibrugarh
- Party: Bharatiya Janata Party
- Spouse: Jyoti Phukan (m. 1987)
- Children: 2
- Parent(s): Late Nabin Ram Phukan (Father); Jyotika Phukan (Mother)

Prasanta Phukan (born 23 July 1954) is a Bharatiya Janata Party politician from Assam. He has been elected in Assam Legislative Assembly election in 2006, 2011, 2016 and 2021 from Dibrugarh. He is the incumbent MLA of Dibrugarh. In 2021, Prasanta Phukan won the Assam Legislative Assembly Election with a margin of 38005 votes. He was the Chairperson of the Managing Committee of Assam Medical College and Hospital, Dibrugarh, before he resigned.
