= Golap Borbora =

6th Chief Minister of Assam

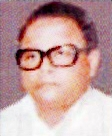

6th Chief Minister of Assam
- In office 12 March 1978 – 4 September 1979
- Deputy: Dulal Baruah
- Preceded by: Sarat Chandra Sinha
- Succeeded by: Jogendra Nath Hazarika

Member of Assam Legislative Assembly
- In office 1978–1983
- Preceded by: Paramananda Gogoi
- Succeeded by: Rajendra Nath Phukon
- Constituency: Tinsukia

Member of Parliament, Rajya Sabha
- In office 3 April 1968 - 2 April 1974
- Constituency: Assam

Personal details
- Born: Golap Chandra Borbora; 29 August 1926 Golaghat, Assam, British India
- Died: 19 March 2006 (aged 79) Guwahati, Assam, India
- Party: Janata Party
- Spouse: Ajalitara Borbora
- Children: 4
- Relatives: Sibamoni Bora (daughter-in-law)

Golap Chandra Borbora (29 August 1926 – 19 March 2006) was an Indian politician who served as the sixth chief minister of Assam from 1978 to 1979. He was the first person outside the Indian National Congress to hold the office. Borbora was a member of Rajya Sabha from 1968 to 1974 and Member of Assam Legislative Assembly (MLA) for Tinsukia from 1978 to 1983.

== Early life and education ==
He was born in Golaghat and had his early schooling in Tinsukia and then studied at the University of Calcutta. His parents were Komol Borbora (an executive officer from Indian Oil Corporation Limited, Digboi) and Puniyaprova Borbora. His father later left his job due to official issues (a long strike in the company). He had ten siblings, one of whom was Renu Saikia, who later became famous as a prolific actress in the Assamese film industry.

== Early political involvement ==
Borbora was a follower of Ram Manohar Lohia and Jai Prakash Narayan and was imprisoned several times during the freedom movement. He had been an active trade unionist from the early days of his political career. He led peasant movements, trade union movements, and went to jail many times. He had been imprisoned nine times in different parts of India since Independence and the last time he was jailed was for 19 months during Emergency.

== Later career and imprisonment ==
In free India he was arrested in 1975 for opposing Indira Gandhi's regime in the emergency in 1975 and spent 18 months in Tihar Jail.

== Chief Ministership ==
=== Appointment ===
Golap Borbora became the State unit president of the Janata Party in 1977 after his release from Tihar jail and led the party to victory with 53 seats and was unanimously elected. He succeeded Sarat Chandra Sinha as Chief Minister. He was elected the first non-Congress Chief Minister of Assam in 1978. He was elected for the Tinsukia constituency, succeeding Paramananda Gogoi.

=== Cabinet ===
Appointments to the cabinet of Borbora included Dulal Chandra Baruah as deputy chief minister and Keshab Chandra Gogoi as finance minister.

=== Domestic policy ===
The Janata Party Government led by Borbora lasted for 18 months only. However, many think that the government did not last long as he had tried to stop influx of illegal immigrants from neighboring countries and also to demonopolize the liquor trade in tea garden belts. His government exempted land revenue for farmers up to 10 bighas and ordered fee exemptions to school students up to HSLC level and all girls up to high school level. The government also introduced free medical treatment in all the government hospitals and allowed free movement of foods-grains within the state.

=== Resignation ===
The Borbora government did not have a majority in the assembly, but worked with the support of the 12-member Communist Party of India (Marxist) (CPI-M), the four-member Plain Tribals Council of Assam (PTCA), and three independents.

Borbora resigned in September 1979. Borbora was succeeded by Jogendra Nath Hazarika.

== Post-Chief Ministership ==
Borbora remained MLA of Tinsukia until 1983. He was succeeded by Rajendra Nath Phukon.

== Personal life ==
He was a non-smoker but a "paan and chai addict". He was married to Ajalitara Borbora, and they had four sons including Pankaj Borbora who is associated with the Bharatiya Janata Party.

== Death ==
He died in 2006. He was 83 and was suffering with old age ailments. He spent his last years away from active politics. He was also an office bearer of the North East Frontier Railway Employees' Union and other labour organisations and was also associated with several social and educational institutions.

== Legacy ==
=== Commemorative efforts ===
As an attempt to commemorate the contributions of Borbora, College Students Welfare Committee, an N.G.O has instituted the C.S.W.C Golap Borbora Scholarship Programme that extends scholarship assistance to meritorious students. The same organisation also hosts the annual C.S.W.C Golap Borbora Memorial Lecture. The organisation was presided by Abhinav P Borbora, the grandson of Golap Borbora.
