= Chief Minister of Assam =

Leader of the executive branch of Government of Assam

- Emblem of Assam

- Flag of India

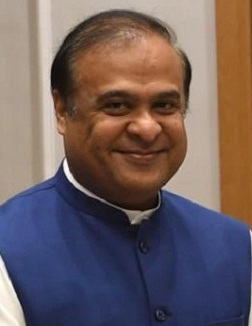
- Incumbent; Himanta Biswa Sarma since 10 May 2021
- Chief Minister's Office; Government of Assam
- Type: Leader of the Executive
- Status: Head of government
- Abbreviation: CMoAssam
- Member of: Legislative Assembly; State Cabinet
- Reports to: Governor of Assam; Assam Legislative Assembly
- Residence: Guwahati
- Seat: State Secretariat, Dispur
- Appointer: Governor of Assam; by convention based on appointees ability to command confidence in the Legislative Assembly
- Term length: At the confidence of the assembly; Chief Minister's term is for five years and is subject to no term limits.
- Precursor: Premier of Assam
- Inaugural holder: Gopinath Bordoloi
- Formation: 26 January 1950 (76 years ago)
- Deputy: Deputy Chief Minister of Assam
- Salary: ₹160,000 (US$1,700
- Website: https://cm.assam.gov.in/

The Chief Minister of Assam, an Indian state, is the head of the government of Assam. As per the Constitution of India, the governor is the state's de jure head, but de facto executive authority rests with the chief minister. Following elections to the Assam Legislative Assembly, the governor usually invites the party (or coalition) with a majority of seats to form the government. The governor appoints the chief minister, whose council of ministers are collectively responsible to the assembly. Given that he has the confidence of the assembly, the Chief Minister's term is for five years and is subject to no term limits. Chief Minister also serves as Leader of the House in the Legislative Assembly.

Since 1946, Assam has had 17 chief ministers. Ten of them belonged to the Indian National Congress, including Gopinath Bordoloi, the first chief minister of Assam, and Anwara Taimur, India's first female Muslim chief minister. Congress party's continuous rule in the state was brought to an end when Golap Borbora led the Janata party to victory in the 1978 elections. Borbora consequently became the first non-Congress chief minister of the state. Prior to that, Borbora was also the first non-Congress leader to be elected to the Rajya Sabha from the state. Congressman Tarun Gogoi is the longest-serving officeholder, having served for 15 years between 2001 and 2016. Sarbananda Sonowal became the first chief minister from the Bharatiya Janata Party, when he was sworn in on 24 May 2016. On 9 May 2021, Himanta Biswa Sarma was announced as the 15th chief minister of Assam.

== Oath as the state chief minister ==
The chief minister serves five years in the office. The following is the oath of the Deputy chief minister of state:

I, <Name of Chief Minister>, do swear in the name of God/solemnly affirm that I will bear true faith and allegiance to the Constitution of India as by law established, that I will uphold the sovereignty and integrity of India, that I will faithfully and conscientiously discharge my duties as a Minister for the State of () and that I will do right to all manner of people in accordance with the Constitution and the law without fear or favour, affection or ill-will.

Oath of Secrecy

"I, [Name], do swear in the name of God / solemnly affirm that I will not directly or indirectly communicate or reveal to any person or persons any matter which shall be brought under my consideration or shall become known to me as a Minister for the State of [Name of State] except as may be required for the due discharge of my duties as such Minister.Moi, [Apunar Naam], iaswaror namot sapun loisu / drirhatare protigya korisu je, moi bidi dara sthapit Bharatborkhor songbidhanor proti sosa sroddha aru loyalty (anugotya) poson korim; moi Bharatborkhor sarbobhoumotto (sovereignty) aru अखंडता (akhandata) রক্ষা (rokshya) korim; moi [Rajyor Naam] rajyor mukhyamantri rupe mor kortobbyobur nispokhopathwabe, bhay-bhiti, ror-alor ba bhed-bhab nohowakoi, hokolubur manuhor proti songbidhan aru ain onuhori nyaipurnobhabe palon korim." 2. Oath of Secrecy (Goponiyator Sapun) "Moi, [Apunar Naam], iaswaror namot sapun loisu / drirhatare protigya korisu je, [Rajyor Naam] rajyor mukhyamantri rupe mor bibeosonalyi ona ba moi gumpua jikunu bikhoy, mor kortobbyobur huthurube palon koribloi proyojon huwar bahi, porokhyo ba protokhyobhabe kunu byokti ba byoktisokolok olopwru prokhash nokorim ba jonablloi nidiw."

== List of Prime ministers Assam Province (1937-50) ==
Under the Government of India Act 1935, a bicameral legislature was set up with a legislative assembly and a legislative council. The premier of Assam was the head of the government and leader of the legislative assembly of Assam Province.

# (Note: A parenthetical number indicates that the incumbent has previously held office.)	Portrait	Name	Constituency	Term of office			Assembly	Party (Note: This column only names the chief minister's party. The state government he heads may be a complex coalition of several parties and independents; these are not listed here.) (coalition)
1		Muhammed Saadulah	Kamrup (South)	1 April 1937	19 September 1938	1 year, 171 days	1st Provincial (1937 election)	Assam Valley Party (INC)
2		Gopinath Bordoloi	Kamrup Sadar (South)	19 September 1938	17 November 1939	1 year, 59 days	1st Provincial (1937 election)	Indian National Congress
(1)		Muhammed Saadulah	Kamrup (South)	17 November 1939	24 December 1941	2 years, 37 days	1st Provincial (1937 election)	Assam Valley Party (AIML)
-	-	Vacant (Governor's Rule)	-	25 December 1941	24 August 1942	242 days	Dissolved	N/A
(1)		Muhammed Saadulah	Kamrup (South)	25 August 1942	11 February 1946	3 years, 170 days	1st Provincial (1937 election)	Assam Valley Party (AIML)
(2)		Gopinath Bordoloi	Kamrup Sadar (South)	11 February 1946	25 January 1950	3 years, 349 days	2nd Provincial (1946 election)	Indian National Congress

== List of chief ministers of Assam (1950-present) ==
Note: ^{†} Died in office

# (Note: A parenthetical number indicates that the incumbent has previously held office.)	Portrait	Name (Birth-Death)	Ministry	Constituency	Term of office			Assembly	Party (Note: This column only names the chief minister's party. The state government he heads may be a complex coalition of several parties and independents; these are not listed here.)
1		Gopinath Bordoloi (1890 – 1950)		Kamrup Sadar South	26 January 1950	5 August 1950^{[†]}	191 days	2nd Provincial (1946 election)	Indian National Congress
2		Bishnuram Medhi (1888 – 1981)	Medhi l	Hajo	9 August 1950	5 March 1952	7 years, 141 days	2nd Provincial (1946 election)	Indian National Congress
2		Bishnuram Medhi (1888 – 1981)	Medhi ll	Hajo	5 March 1952	27 February 1957	7 years, 141 days	1st (1952 election)	Indian National Congress
2		Bishnuram Medhi (1888 – 1981)	Medhi lll	Hajo	27 February 1957	28 December 1957	7 years, 141 days	2nd (1957 election)	Indian National Congress
3		Bimala Prasad Chaliha (1912 – 1971)	Chaliha l	Badarpur	28 December 1957	22 March 1962	12 years, 318 days	2nd (1957 election)	Indian National Congress
3		Bimala Prasad Chaliha (1912 – 1971)	Chaliha ll	Sonari	22 March 1962	16 March 1967	12 years, 318 days	3rd (1962 election)	Indian National Congress
3		Bimala Prasad Chaliha (1912 – 1971)	Chaliha lll	Sonari	16 March 1967	11 November 1970	12 years, 318 days	4th (1967 election)	Indian National Congress
4		Mahendra Mohan Choudhry (1908 – 1982)	Choudhry Ministry	Gauhati East	11 November 1970	31 January 1972	1 year, 81 days	4th (1967 election)	Indian National Congress
5		Sarat Chandra Sinha (1914 – 2005)	Sinha Ministry	Bilasipara East	31 January 1972	12 March 1978	6 years, 40 days	5th (1972 election)	Indian National Congress
6		Golap Borbora (1926 – 2006)	Borbora Ministry	Tinsukia	12 March 1978	9 September 1979	1 year, 181 days	6th (1978 election)	Janata Party
7		Jogendra Nath Hazarika (1924 – 1998)	Hazarika Ministry	Duliajan	9 September 1979	12 December 1979	94 days	6th (1978 election)	Janata Party
–		Vacant (Note: When President's rule is in force in a state, its council of ministers stands dissolved. The office of chief minister thus lies vacant. At times, the legislative assembly also stands dissolved.) (President's rule)		N/A	12 December 1979	6 December 1980	360 days	6th (1978 election)	N/A
8		Anwara Taimur (1936 – 2020)	Taimur Ministry	Dalgaon	6 December 1980	30 June 1981	206 days	6th (1978 election)	Indian National Congress
–		Vacant (President's rule)		N/A	30 June 1981	13 January 1982	197 days	6th (1978 election)	N/A
9		Keshab Chandra Gogoi (1926 – 1998)		Dibrugarh	13 January 1982	19 March 1982	65 days	6th (1978 election)	Indian National Congress
–		Vacant (President's rule)		N/A	19 March 1982	27 February 1983	345 days	Dissolved	N/A
10		Hiteswar Saikia (1934 – 1996)	Saikia I	Nazira	27 February 1983	24 December 1985	2 years, 300 days	7th (1983 election)	Indian National Congress
11		Prafulla Kumar Mahanta (b.1952)	Mahanta l	Nowgong	24 December 1985	28 November 1990	4 years, 339 days	8th (1985 election)	Asom Gana Parishad
–		Vacant (President's rule)		N/A	28 November 1990	30 June 1991	214 days	Dissolved	N/A
(10)		Hiteswar Saikia (1934 – 1996)	Saikia II	Nazira	30 June 1991	22 April 1996^{[†]}	4 years, 297 days	9th (1991 election)	Indian National Congress
12		Bhumidhar Barman (1931 – 2021)	Barman	Barkhetri	22 April 1996	15 May 1996	23 days	9th (1991 election)	Indian National Congress
(11)		Prafulla Kumar Mahanta (b.1952)	Mahanta II	Barhampur	15 May 1996	18 May 2001	5 years, 3 days	10th (1996 election)	Asom Gana Parishad
13		Tarun Gogoi (1936 – 2020)	Gogoi I	Titabor	18 May 2001	29 May 2006	15 years, 6 days	11th (2001 election)	Indian National Congress
13		Tarun Gogoi (1936 – 2020)	Gogoi II	Titabor	29 May 2006	13 May 2011	15 years, 6 days	12th (2006 election)	Indian National Congress
13		Tarun Gogoi (1936 – 2020)	Gogoi III	Titabor	13 May 2011	24 May 2016	15 years, 6 days	13th (2011 election)	Indian National Congress
14		Sarbananda Sonowal (b.1962)	Sonowal	Majuli	24 May 2016	10 May 2021	4 years, 351 days	14th (2016 election)	Bharatiya Janata Party
15		Himanta Biswa Sarma (b.1969)	Sarma I	Jalukbari	10 May 2021	12 May 2026	5 years, 169 days	15th (2021 election)	Bharatiya Janata Party
15		Himanta Biswa Sarma (b.1969)	Sarma II	Jalukbari	12 May 2026	Incumbent	5 years, 169 days	16th (2026 election)	Bharatiya Janata Party

== Statistics ==
=== List by chief minister ===
#	Chief Minister	Party	Term of office	
#	Chief Minister	Party	Longest tenure	Total tenure
1	Tarun Gogoi	INC	15 years, 6 days	
2	Bimala Prasad Chaliha	INC	12 years, 318 days	
3	Prafulla Kumar Mahanta	AGP	5 years, 3 days	9 years, 342 days
4	Hiteswar Saikia	INC	4 years, 297 days	7 years, 232 days
5	Bishnuram Medhi	INC	7 years, 141 days	
6	Sarat Chandra Sinha	INC	6 years, 40 days	
7	Himanta Biswa Sarma	BJP	5 years, 169 days	
8	Sarbananda Sonowal	BJP	4 years, 351 days	
9	Golap Borbora	JP	1 year, 181 days	
10	Mahendra Mohan Choudhry	INC	1 year, 81 days	
11	Anwara Taimur	INC	206 days	
12	Gopinath Bordoloi	INC	191 days	
14	Jogendra Nath Hazarika	JP	94 days	
13	Keshab Chandra Gogoi	INC	65 days	
15	Bhumidhar Barman	INC	23 days	

=== Timeline ===
Fraction of time of holding Chief minister's office by party (as of 23 August 2026)
1. Indian National Congress (67.3%)
2. Bharatiya Janata Party (13.4%)
3. Asom Gana Parishad (13.0%)
4. Janata Party (2.29%)
5. President's Rule (3.99%)

== See also ==
- List of current Indian chief ministers
- List of governors of Assam
- List of Assam ministries
