= Golok Rajbanshi =

Indian politician (1925–2001)

Leader of the Opposition Assam Legislative Assembly
- Chief Minister: Prafulla Kumar Mahanta

Cabinet Minister, Government of Assam
- In office 30 June 1991 – 21 April 1996
- Chief Minister: Hiteswar Saikia

Cabinet Minister, Government of Assam
- In office 27 February 1983 – 23 December 1985
- Chief Minister: Hiteswar Saikia

Minister for Electricity, Mines, Parliamentary Affairs and Animal Husbandry
- In office 13 January 1982 – 19 March 1982
- Chief Minister: Keshab Chandra Gogoi

Cabinet Minister, Government of Assam
- In office 6 December 1980 – 30 June 1981
- Chief Minister: Anwara Taimur

Deputy Speaker of the Assam Legislative Assembly
- In office 6 April 1972 – 3 March 1978
- Speaker: Ramesh Chandra Barooah
- Preceded by: R.N. Sen
- Succeeded by: Sheikh Chand Mohammad

Member of Assam Legislative Assembly
- In office 3 March 1978 – 12 June 1996
- Preceded by: constituency established
- Succeeded by: Bhimananda Tanti
- Constituency: Rangapara
- In office 15 March 1972 – 3 March 1978
- Preceded by: Biswadeb Sarma
- Succeeded by: constituency abolished
- Constituency: Balipara

Personal details
- Born: 25 January 1925
- Died: 27 March 2001 (aged 76)
- Party: Indian National Congress
- Other political affiliations: Congress Socialist Party (until 1956)
- Spouse: Smti Lily Rajbanshi
- Children: 3
- Parent: Siddhiram Rajbanshi (father)
- Education: Gauhati University
- Occupation: Politician

Golok Chandra Rajbanshi (25 January 1925 – 27 March 2001) was an Indian politician from the state of Assam who served as Leader of the Opposition in the Assam Legislative Assembly. He also served as deputy speaker of the assembly from 1972 to 1978 and was a member of Assam Legislative Assembly once for Balipara and four times for Rangapara constituencies. He was also a cabinet minister four times throughout his political career.

== Early life and education ==
Rajbanshi was born on 25 January 1925 in Jamuguri to the late Siddhiram Rajbanshi. He had a B.A and LLB from Gauhati University. He joined Tezpur Bar in 1956. He was a member of the Congress Socialist Party until 1956 when he resigned. He was associated with Students Congress Young Socialist League, Civil Liberties Association, Bharat Sevak Samaj, Cooperative Union I.N.T.U.C and many other organisations. He married Lily Rajbanshi and they had 2 sons and 1 daughter. He enjoyed fishing and tiger catching by net and drama and social work. He visited London in England, West Germany, Italy, France and Switzerland.

== Political career (1972–1996) ==
=== Early political career ===
Rajbanshi was the Indian National Congress candidate for Balipara in the 1972 Assam Legislative Assembly election. He received 18538 votes, and became MLA of the constituency. He was made deputy speaker and served until 1978.

=== Rangpara MLA and ministership ===
Rajbanshi was the Indian National Congress candidate for the newly established constituency of Rangapara in the 1978 Assam Legislative Assembly election. He received 16100 votes, 42.88% of the total vote and became MLA of the constituency. He defeated his nearest opponent by 5798 votes. He was made cabinet minister under Anwara Taimur. He was later inducted into the Keshab Chandra Gogoi cabinet as minister for electricity, mines, parliamentary affairs and animal husbandry.

In the 1983 Assam Legislative Assembly election, he received 10920 votes, 53.89% of the total vote. He was reelected, defeating his nearest opponent by 6367 votes. Following the formation of the first Hiteswar Saikia ministry, he was inducted into the cabinet.

In the 1985 Assam Legislative Assembly election, Rajbanshi sought reelection as the Indian National Congress candidate for Rangapara. He received 17084 votes, 34.36% of the total vote, defeating his nearest opponent by 7407 votes. He was made Leader of the Opposition in Assam Legislative Assembly.

=== Motion of no-confidence against the Mahanta ministry ===
In early 1990, Rajbanshi moved a motion of no-confidence against the Prafulla Kumar Mahanta ministry for its alleged inaction against the United Liberation Front of Assam activists and failures on other fronts. The motion was discussed on 2 and 3 April 1990. Moving the debate Rajbanshi stated that Assamese youths were joining the ULFA because Asom Gana Parishad (AGP) had failed to fulfil the aspirations of the people. Rajbanshi said that AGP’s wrong policies had darkened the future of the Assamese people. Rajbanshi alleged that an AGP MLA had demanded the Chief Minister’s resignation.

Chief Minister Prafulla Kumar Mahanta said that Congress had no right to criticise his government as they too had committed many misdeeds while in power. He refuted allegations that the AGP government had neglected Scheduled castes and tribes and said that his government had spent crores each year for the development of these communities and was filling up the vacancies in jobs reserved for them which the previous government had never attempted. Referring to the allegations of financial mismanagement, Mahanta said it was easy to level such charges but it was not possible to do away with rules which were in operation since independence and which were the main reasons for the financial crisis in the state. He said that the AGP government had provided jobs to 20000 youths despite recommendations from the ninth financial commission against it. In response to the corruption allegations, Mahanta said his government had never hidden facts from the public and whenever there had been allegations even against ministers they were enquired into. Mahanta stated that despite charges in the press, none of his ministers were involved in the ULFA. He said that his government held all-party meetings to combat extremism in Assam and sought the views of all political parties in this regard.

The motion was defeated by voice-vote.

=== Later years as MLA ===
In the 1991 Assam Legislative Assembly election, he received 30516 votes, 50.14% of the total vote. He defeated his nearest opponent by 17613 votes and was reelected. He was inducted into the Hiteswar Saikia cabinet. He did not seek reelection in Rangapara after serving as MLA for 18 years, and he was succeeded by the Congress candidate Bhimananda Tanti.

== Death ==
Rajbanshi died at his residence on 27 March 2001, at the age of 76.

== Positions held ==
- 1972: Member, Assam Legislative Assembly
- 1972: Deputy Speaker, Assam Legislative Assembly
- 1978: Member, Assam Legislative Assembly
- 1980: Cabinet Minister, Government of Assam
- 1982: Cabinet Minister, Government of Assam
- 1983: Member, Assam Legislative Assembly
- 1983: Cabinet Minister, Government of Assam
- 1985: Member, Assam Legislative Assembly
- Leader of the Opposition, Assam Legislative Assembly
- 1991: Member, Assam Legislative Assembly
- 1991: Cabinet Minister, Government of Assam
