= First Mahanta ministry =

Cabinet of Assam, India (1985–1990)

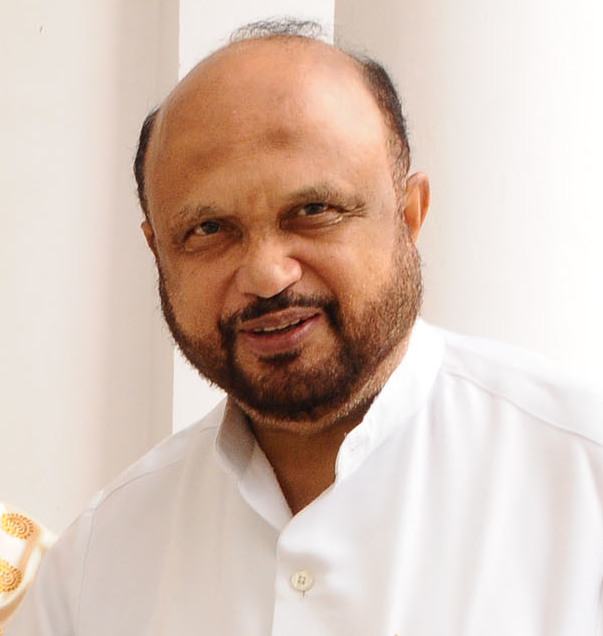
- Date formed: 24 December 1985
- Date dissolved: 28 November 1990

People and organisations
- Governor: Bhishma Narain Singh; Hari Dev Joshi; Anisetti Raghuvir; Devi Das Thakur
- Chief Minister: Prafulla Kumar Mahanta
- Member party: AGP
- Opposition party: Indian National Congress

History
- Election: 1985
- Legislature term: 5 years
- Predecessor: Saikia I
- Successor: President's rule

The First Ministry of Prafulla Kumar Mahanta was the Cabinet of Assam headed by Chief Minister of Assam Prafulla Kumar Mahanta that was formed after the 1985 Assam Legislative Assembly election. Mahanta became the youngest Chief Minister in India and was sworn in at the Nehru Stadium on 24 December 1985 by Governor Bhishma Narain Singh, the youngest Governor in India. The first cabinet consisted of Mahanta along with 13 cabinet ministers and 7 ministers of state. The ministry was reshuffled in 1986 and 1988.

== Ministers ==
Name	Portfolio	Party
Cabinet Ministers
Prafulla Kumar Mahanta; Chief Minister	Personnel; Finance; Accord Implementation; Administration; Forest; Health; Election; Planning and Development; Cultural Affairs; Sports and Youth Welfare; Other departments not allotted specifically	AGP
Bhrigu Kumar Phukan	Home; Political; General Administration; Publicity; Jails; Printingand Stationery; Excise; Tourism	AGP
Lalit Chandra Rajkhowa	Food and Civil Supplies; Transport Corporation; Rural Development	AGP
Atul Bora	Public Works Department; Town and Country Planning	AGP
Brindaban Goswami	Education; Science; Technology; Environment	AGP
Thaneswar Boro	Revenue; Registration; Stamps; Relief; Rehabilitation	AGP
Bharat Narah	Flood Control; Irrigation; Welfare of Plains and Tribal Areas	AGP
Digen Bora	Industry; Power; Mines; Minerals; Public Health Engineering	AGP
Surendra Nath Medhi	Law; Justice; Legislative; Judicial	AGP
Nagen Sarma	Veterinary; Handloom; Textiles; Sericulture; Weaving	AGP
Bargi Prasad Telenga	Labour; Employment	AGP
Sahidul Alam Choudhury	Administration; Wagf Properties; Haj Committee	AGP
Chandra Arandhara	Panchayat and Community Development	AGP
Nilamoni Das	Agriculture; Fisheries	AGP
Ministers of State
Dipen Tanti	Transport and Labour	AGP
Pradip Gogoi	Parliamentary Affairs	AGP
Anirudha Singh Choudhury	Relief and Rehabilitation; Backward Classes	AGP
Rekha Rani Das Boro	Women; Social Welfare; Handloom; Textile; Sericulture; Weaving	AGP
Jatin Mali	Health; Family and Child Welfare	AGP
Padmeswar Doley	Industries; Power; Mines; Minerals	AGP
Moti Das	Agriculture; Fisheries	AGP
