= Prakash Mehrotra =

Indian politician

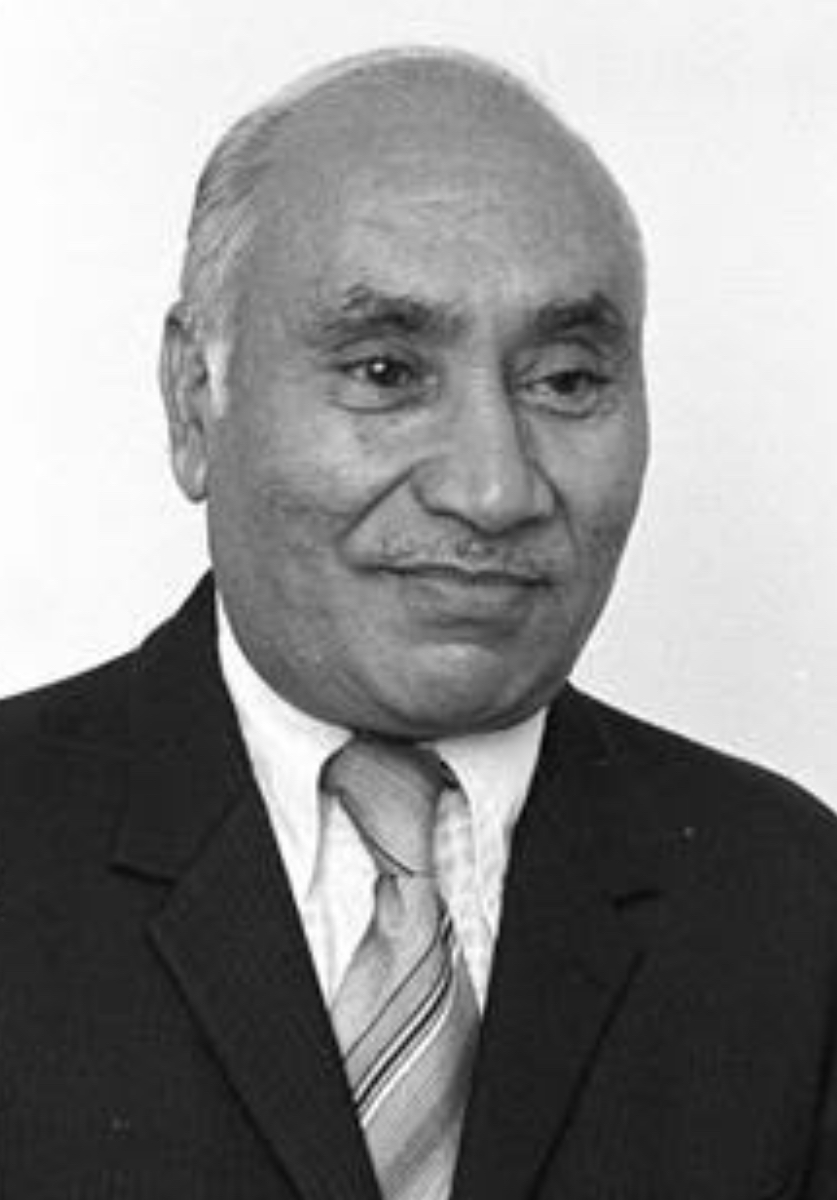
Prakash Mehrotra

Prakash Mehrotra (26 February 1925 – 7 March 1988) was an Indian politician from the Indian National Congress. He was member of Rajya Sabha, the upper house of the Parliament of India, representing the state of Uttar Pradesh from 3 April 1976 to 9 August 1981. He served as the Governor of Assam and of Meghalaya (10 August 1981 – 28 March 1984). He also served as the Indian High Commissioner to the United Kingdom. He was married to Preeti Mehrotra and had 4 daughters and 1 son, Ravi Prakash Mehrotra who is an eminent lawyer in the Supreme Court of India.
