= Sonaram Thaosen =

Indian politician

Minister for Soil Conservation, Printing, Stationery, Registration, and Stamps
- In office 30 January 1982 – 19 March 1982
- Chief Minister: Keshab Chandra Gogoi

Member of Assam Legislative Assembly
- In office 1978–1983
- Preceded by: J.B. Hagjer
- Succeeded by: Gobinda Chandra Langthasa
- Constituency: Haflong

Personal details
- Born: c.1922 Maibang, Assam, India
- Party: Janata Party
- Spouse: Dhausmaidi Thaosen
- Children: 10

Sonaram Thaosen (c. 1922 – unknown) was an Indian politician from Assam who was Member of Assam Legislative Assembly (MLA) for Haflong, and a cabinet minister.

== Early life ==
Thaosen was born in 1922 in Maibang.

== Political career ==
Thaosen was elected MLA of Haflong in 1978. He served as Minister for Soil Conservation, Printing and Stationery, Registration and Stamps under Keshab Chandra Gogoi.

== Personal life ==
Thaosen was married to Dhausmaidi Thaosen, and they had five sons and five daughters together.
