= A. F. Golam Osmani =

Indian politician

Member of parliament of Lok Sabha
- In office 1998–2009
- Preceded by: Uddhab Barman
- Succeeded by: Ismail Hussain
- Constituency: Barpeta

Member of the Assam Legislative Assembly
- In office 1978–1982

Personal details
- Born: 1 April 1933 Cachar district, Assam
- Died: 31 March 2009 (aged 75) All India Institute of Medical Sciences, New Delhi
- Party: INC
- Spouse: Jahanara Osmani
- Children: 2 sons and 1 daughter
- As of 17 February, 2012

A. F. Golam Osmani (1 April 1933 – 31 March 2009) was an Indian politician and a member of the 14th Lok Sabha of India. He represented the Barpeta constituency of Assam and was a member of the Indian National Congress (INC). He died on 31 March 2009 at the All India Institute of Medical Sciences (AIIMS) in New Delhi. He had been suffering from lung cancer.

He was earlier a member of the 12th and 13th Lok Sabha. During 1978-1982 he was elected twice to Assam Legislative Assembly.
