= Jogendra Nath Hazarika =

7th Chief Minister of Assam

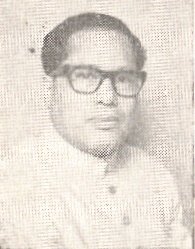

7th Chief Minister of Assam
- In office 9 September 1979 – 11 December 1979
- Governor: Lallan Prasad Singh
- Preceded by: Golap Borbora
- Succeeded by: Anwara Taimur (Note: President's rule between 12 December 1979 and 5 December 1980)

Member of Parliament, Lok Sabha
- In office 17 April 1952 – 27 December 1970
- Preceded by: Constituency established
- Succeeded by: Robindranath Kakoti
- Constituency: Dibrugarh, Assam

Speaker of Assam Legislative Assembly
- In office 21 March 1978 – 4 September 1979
- Preceded by: Ramesh Chandra Barooah
- Succeeded by: Sheikh Chand Mohammad

Member of Assam Legislative Assembly
- In office 1978–1985
- Preceded by: Constituency established
- Succeeded by: Amiya Gogoi
- Constituency: Duliajan

Personal details
- Born: 9 September 1924 Tengakhat Mawza, Assam, British India
- Died: 1998 (aged 73–74) Assam, India
- Party: Asom Janata Dal
- Other political affiliations: Janata Party; Indian National Congress
- Spouse: Beena Hazarika
- Children: 1
- Occupation: Politician; lawyer

Jogendra Nath Hazarika (9 September 1924 – 1998) was an Indian politician who served as the 7th chief minister of Assam from September to December 1979.

== Early life and education ==
Hazarika was born in September 1924 in Tengakhat Mawza, Lakhimpur District (now Dibrugarh District) in Assam. His family were Sonowal Kacharis. He attended school in his home town, and in 1946 he graduated from Ripon College. He subsequently obtained a Master of Arts (MA) from the University of Calcutta in 1950 and an L.L.B in 1952 from the Calcutta law college.

== Legal career ==
Hazarika joined Dibrugarh district bar in 1952. He joined the Assam High Court bar and Supreme Court Bar in 1962.

== Early political career ==
Hazarika was elected to the Lok Sabha, the lower house of the Parliament of India, from the Dibrugarh constituency in Assam in 1951, 1957, 1962 and 1967. He served as Parliamentary Secretary to the Prime Minister Jawaharlal Nehru from August 1952 to May 1962 in the Ministry of External Affairs.

Hazarika was the founding president of Assam Pradesh Congress Committee (APCC) from 1969 to 1974. He defected to the Janata Party in 1977.

He was a Member of the Assam Legislative Assembly (MLA) from 1978 to 1985, and Speaker of the Assam Legislative Assembly between 1978 and 1979.

== Chief Ministership (1979) ==
=== Appointment ===
The controversy that led to fall of the Borbora ministry led to Hazarika along with sixteen other dissidents forming the breakaway Assam Janata Dal, while others formed the Janata (S). Hazarika led a 17-member breakaway of the Assam Janata Dal party which formed a government.

=== Resignation ===
On 7 November 1979, a motion of no confidence was moved against the Hazarika ministry by Nagen Baruah, former chief minister Golap Borbora, and Jiban Bora. In response to the motion, Hazarika assured that his government would attempt to eliminate anomalies in the revision of electoral rolls, and said that all foreign nationals would be deported from Assam through constitutional and legal procedures. During the discussions on the motion of no confidence, seven MLAs (six belonging to the Janata (S) and one from the PDF) withdrew their support for the Hazarika ministry. The motion was declared lost by voice vote.

Amidst continued discontent with the Hazarika ministry, the Congress (U) withdrew their support. After this, eleven ministers and two parliamentary secretaries led by finance minister Keshab Chandra Gogoi resigned, and the Hazarika ministry subsequently collapsed. On 12 December, president Neelam Sanjiva Reddy brought the state under president's rule. Hazarika was succeeded as leader of the Janata Dal by Keshab Chandra Gogoi.

== Personal life ==
Hazarika was married to Beena Hazarika and they had one son together.

== See also ==
- 1st Lok Sabha
- 2nd Lok Sabha
