= Anwara Taimur =

8th Chief Minister of Assam

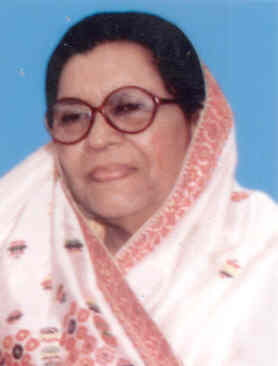

8th Chief Minister of Assam
- In office 6 December 1980 – 30 June 1981
- Governor: Lallan Prasad Singh
- Preceded by: President's rule Jogendra Nath Hazarika
- Succeeded by: President's rule Keshab Chandra Gogoi

Member of Parliament, Rajya Sabha
- In office 3 April 2004 – 2 April 2010
- Constituency: Assam
- In office 25 November 1988 – 8 May 1990
- Nominated by: Ramaswamy Venkataraman
- Appointed by: Shankar Dayal Sharma
- Constituency: Nominated
Assam state government positions
Minister of Agriculture
In office 1991–1996
| Chief Minister | Hiteswar Saikia |
Minister of Public Works
In office 1983–1985
| Chief Minister | Hiteswar Saikia |
Minister of Education
In office 1975–1978
| Chief Minister | Sarat Chandra Singha |
Member of the Assam Legislative Assembly
In office 1991–1996
| Preceded by | Abdul Jabbar |
| Succeeded by | Abdul Jabbar |
| Constituency | Dalgaon |
In office 1978–1985
| Preceded by | Hashimuduin Ahmed |
| Succeeded by | Abdul Jabbar |
| Constituency | Dalgaon |
In office 1972–1978
| Preceded by | Md. Matlibuddin |
| Succeeded by | Anil Das |
| Constituency | Mangaldoi |

Personal details
- Born: 24 November 1936 Assam Province, British India
- Died: 28 September 2020 (aged 83) Australia
- Party: All India United Democratic Front (2011–2020)
- Other political affiliations: Indian National Congress (before 2011)
- Spouse: Md. Muhibuddin Tainur
- Parent: Syed Yusef Ali (father)
- Education: Aligarh Muslim University

Syeda Anwara Taimur (24 November 1936 – 28 September 2020) was an Indian politician who was Chief Minister of Assam from 6 December 1980 to 30 June 1981. She was a leader of the Indian National Congress in Assam and a member of the All India Congress Committee (AICC).

== Personal life ==
She graduated from Aligarh Muslim University with economics honors.

Anwara was a lecturer in Economics at the Devicharan Barua Girls' College, Jorhat in 1956.

== Political career ==
She is the only female and Muslim Chief Minister of Assam in the history of the state. She was Chief Minister of Assam from 6 December 1980 to 30 June 1981. In Indian history also, Syeda Anwara Taimur was the first Muslim woman Chief Minister of any state. Her term as chief minister ended when the state was put under President's rule for six months.

From 1983 to 1985 she was the PWD minister of the same state.

She was an elected member of the Assam Assembly (MLA) in 1972, 1978, 1983, and 1991. In 1988 she was nominated to the Indian Parliament (Rajya Sabha). In 1991 she was appointed to the post of minister for agriculture in Assam.

Anwara joined All India United Democratic Front in 2011. Anwara is among the notable names not included in the final draft of 2018 National Register of Citizens (NRC), for which, she later clarified that her family members may not have applied to get her name included in the list.

== Death ==
Taimur died on 28 September 2020 due to cardiac arrest in Australia, where she stayed with her son for her last four years.

== Positions held ==
| Year | Description |
|---|---|
| 1972–1978 | Elected to 5th Assam Assembly: Cabinet Minister - Education (1975–78) |
| 1978–1983 | Elected to 6th Assam Assembly: 8th Chief Minister of Assam (1980–81) |
| 1983–1985 | Elected to 7th Assam Assembly: Cabinet Minister - Public Works |
| 1988–1990 | Nominated to Rajya Sabha |
| 1991–1996 | Elected to 9th Assam Assembly: Cabinet Minister - Agriculture, Haj and Wakf Property |
| 2004–2010 | Elected to Rajya Sabha: Chairperson - Committee on Papers Laid on the Table (2004–10); Member - Committee on Urban Development (2004–10); Member - Committee on Empowerment of Women (2004–10); Member - General Purposes Committee (2004–10); Member - Consultative Committee for the Ministry of Health and Family Welfare (2004–10); Vice President - India-Bangladesh Parliamentary Friendship Group (2005–10); Member - National Advisory Committee of Minority Department (2006–10) |

== Notes ==
Encyclopaedia of Scheduled Tribes in India: In Five Volumes by P. K. Mohanty Page 124.

Rajya Sabha
| Preceded by NA | Member of Parliament for Rajya Sabha (Nominated); 25 November 1988 – 8 May 1990 | Succeeded by NA |
| Preceded by NA | Member of Parliament for Rajya Sabha (Assam); 3 April 2004 – 2 April 2004 | Succeeded by NA |
Political offices
| Preceded by President's Rule | Chief Minister of Assam; 6 December 1980 – 30 June 1981 | Succeeded by President's Rule |
