= Dibrugarh Assembly constituency =

Constituency of the Assam legislative assembly in India

Dibrugarh
- Constituency No. 88 for the Assam Legislative Assembly

Constituency details
- Country: India
- Region: Northeast India
- State: Assam
- District: Dibrugarh
- Lok Sabha constituency: Dibrugarh
- Established: 1957 (69 years ago)
- Reservation: None
- Elected year: 2026

Dibrugarh is one of the 126 assembly constituencies of Assam a north east state of India. Dibrugarh is also part of Dibrugarh Lok Sabha constituency.

== Dibrugarh Assembly constituency ==
Following are details on Dibrugarh Assembly constituency-

- Country: India.
- State: Assam.
- District: Dibrugarh district.
- Lok Sabha Constituency: Dibrugarh Lok Sabha/Parliamentary constituency.
- Assembly Categorisation: Urban constituency.
- Literacy Level: 76.22%.
- Eligible Electors as per 2021 General Elections: 1,50,174 Eligible Electors. Male Electors:74,243. Female Electors:75,931 .
- Geographic Co-Ordinates: 27°33'49.7"N 94°56'44.9"E.
- Total Area Covered:436 square kilometres.
- Area Includes: Jamirah and Dibrugarh mouzas in Dibrugarh thana in Dibrugarh sub-division, of Dibrugarh district of Assam.
- Inter State Border :Dibrugarh.
- Number Of Polling Stations: Year 2011–161, Year 2016–161, Year 2021–116.

== Members of the Legislative Assembly ==
Following is the list of past members representing Dibrugarh Assembly constituency in Assam Legislature.

Election	Name	Party
2026	Prasanta Phukan	Bharatiya Janata Party
2021	Prasanta Phukan	Bharatiya Janata Party
2016	Prasanta Phukan	Bharatiya Janata Party
2011	Prasanta Phukan	Bharatiya Janata Party
2006	Prasanta Phukan	Bharatiya Janata Party
2001	Kalyan Kumar Gogoi	Indian National Congress
2001 (By-election)	Kalyan Kumar Gogoi	Indian National Congress
1996	Kalyan Kumar Gogoi	Indian National Congress
1991	Keshab Chandra Gogoi	Indian National Congress
1985	Keshab Chandra Gogoi	Indian National Congress
1983	Keshab Chandra Gogoi	Indian National Congress
1978	Keshab Chandra Gogoi	Janata Party
1972	Ramesh Chandra Barooah	Indian National Congress
1967	Ramesh Chandra Barooah	Indian National Congress
1962	Ramesh Chandra Barooah	Indian National Congress
1961 (By-election)	Ramesh Chandra Barooah	Indian National Congress
1957	Nilmoni Barthakur	Communist Party of India

== Election results ==
=== 2026 ===
2026 Assam Legislative Assembly election: Dibrugarh
Party	Candidate	Votes	%	±%
BJP	Prasanta Phukan	106803	67.79	
AJP	Mainak Patra	34760	22.06	
NOTA	NOTA	4284	2.72	
Margin of victory		72043		
Turnout		157546		
Rejected ballots				
Registered electors				
BJP hold		Swing		

=== 2021 ===
2021 Assam Legislative Assembly election: Dibrugarh
Party	Candidate	Votes	%	±%
BJP	Prasanta Phukan	68,762	60.43	−0.19
INC	Rajkumar Nilanetra Neog	30757	27.03	
AJP	Ajit Borgohain	11062	9.72	
NOTA	NOTA	1845	1.62	+0.56
Independent	Kamal Hazarika	755	0.66	
Asom Songrami Mancha	Syed Mahshinur Rahman	601	0.53	
Majority		38005	32.97	
BJP hold		Swing		
