= 2001 Assam Legislative Assembly election =

Indian state election

- 10 May 2001

126 seats in the Assam Legislative Assembly 64 seats needed for a majority
- Registered: 14,439,167
- Turnout: 75.1%
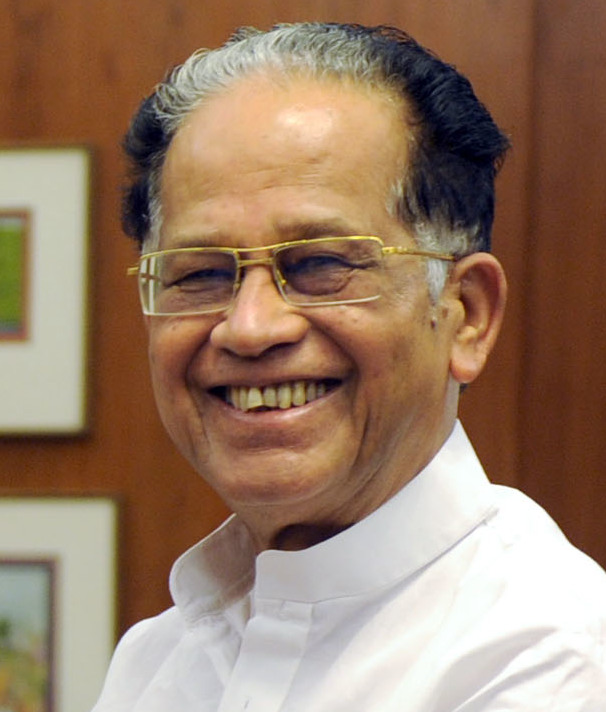

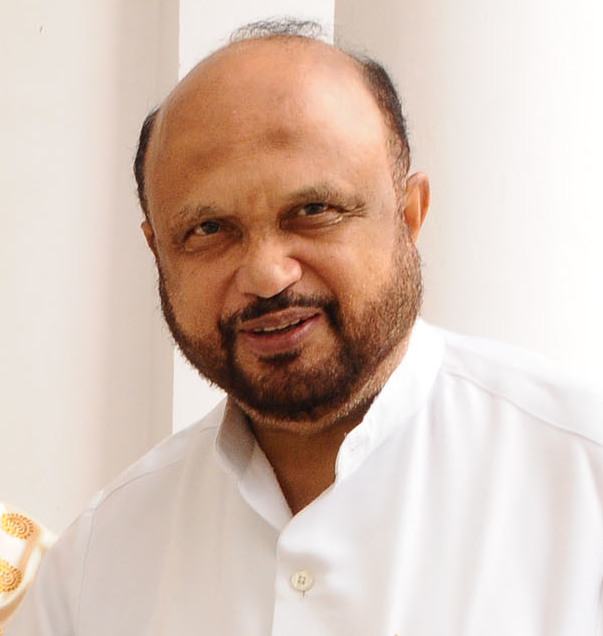
	Majority party	Minority party
Leader	Tarun Gogoi	Prafulla Kumar Mahanta
Party	INC	AGP
Last election	34	59
Seats won	71	20
Seat change	▲37	▼39
Percentage	39.75%	20.02%
CM before election
Prafulla Kumar Mahanta
AGP
Elected CM
Tarun Gogoi
INC

Elections to the Assam Legislative Assembly were held in 2001 to elect members of 114 constituencies in Assam, India. The Indian National Congress won the popular vote and a majority of seats and Tarun Gogoi was appointed as the Chief Minister of Assam. The number of constituencies was set as 126, by the recommendation of the Delimitation Commission of India.

After the elections, the incumbent Member of Parliament for Kaliabor, Tarun Gogoi, became the Chief Minister of Assam. His brother, Dip Gogoi, the winner from Titabar assembly constituency, resigned from his seat in order that Tarun Gogoi could win the assembly seat in the by-election. Dip Gogoi later fought and won the by-election for the, now vacant, Kaliabor Lok Sabha seat.

== Background ==
In the 1996 elections, a five-party electoral alliance headed by the Asom Gana Parishad formed the government. Between 1997 and 2001, the insurgency in Assam led to 1548 deaths, including 333 security personnel. The mass-killings of Hindi-speaking migrants by the United Liberation Front of Assam (ULFA) became a political and security issue. In December 2000, the Union Government of India headed by the National Democratic Alliance (NDA) authorised the Indian army to execute military operations against the ULFA. In April 2001, the Asom Gana Parishad ruling in Assam, and the Bharatiya Janata Party heading the federal NDA-led Union Government of India, formed an electoral alliance against the Indian National Congress.

== Schedule ==
Event	Date
Date for Nominations	16 April 2001
Last Date for filing Nominations	23 April 2001
Date for scrutiny of nominations	24 April 2001
Last date for withdrawal of candidatures	26 April 2001
Date of poll	10 May 2001
Date of counting	13 May 2001

== Parties and alliances ==
Party	Flag	Symbol	Leader	Seats
Indian National Congress			Tarun Gogoi	126

National Democratic Alliance
Party	Flag	Symbol	Leader	Seats
Asom Gana Parishad			Prafulla Kumar Mahanta	77
Bharatiya Janata Party			Narayan Chandra Borkataky	46 (Note: Friendly contest on 13 seats between BJP and other alliance partners.)
All Bodo Students Union				11 (Note: ABSU Contested as Independent.)
Autonomous State Demand Committee (United)				5
Total				126+13

== Result ==
Party	Votes	%	Seats	+/–
Indian National Congress	4,230,676	39.75	71	▲37
Asom Gana Parishad	2,130,118	20.02	20	▼39
Bharatiya Janata Party	995,004	9.35	8	▲4
Nationalist Congress Party	267,173	2.51	3	▲1
Autonomous State Demand Committee	118,610	1.11	2	▼3
Samajwadi Party	109,822	1.03	1	New
Samata Party	83,815	0.79	1	New
All India Trinamool Congress	58,361	0.55	1	New
Communist Party of India (Marxist)	189,349	1.78	0	▼2
Communist Party of India	116,889	1.10	0	▼3
Autonomous State Demand Committee (Progressive)	98,032	0.92	0	New
United Minorities Front, Assam	43,712	0.41	0	▼2
People's Democratic Front (India)	35,147	0.33	0	New
Others	88,626	0.83	0	0
Independents	2,076,653	19.51	19	▲8
Total	10,641,987	100.00	126	▲4
Valid votes	10,641,987	98.26		
Invalid/blank votes	188,628	1.74		
Total votes	10,830,615	100.00		
Registered voters/turnout	14,439,167	75.01		
Source: ECI

=== Result by constituency ===
Assembly Constituency		Winner				Runner Up				Margin
#	Name	Candidate	Party	Votes	%	Candidate	Party	Votes	%	Margin
1	Ratabari (SC)	Rathish Ranjan Choudhury	IND	22322	33.4	Sambhu Sing Mallah	BJP	20809	31.1	1513
2	Patharkandi	Monilal Gowala	INC	46443	53.4	Shukhendu Shekhar Dutta	BJP	20178	23.2	26265
3	Karimganj North	Mission Ranjan Das	BJP	45429	46.4	Rashid Ahmed Choudhury	UMFA	28108	28.7	17321
4	Karimganj South	Siddique Ahmed	SAP	31639	38.3	Abdul Muqtadir Choudhury	INC	28280	34.2	3359
5	Badarpur	Jamal Uddin Ahmed	AITC	30471	40.6	Dipak Deb	BJP	28563	38.1	1908
6	Hailakandi	Sahab Uddin Choudhury	IND	35629	42.2	Mrityunjoy Chakraborty	IND	26805	31.7	8824
7	Katlicherra	Gautam Roy	INC	48069	55.2	Misbahul Islam Laskar	IND	13378	15.4	34691
8	Algapur	Sahidul Alam Choudhury	AGP	48144	57.6	Maharam Ali Mazumder	INC	32264	38.6	15880
9	Silchar	Bimolangshu Roy	BJP	45308	48.9	Kamalendu Bhattacharjee	INC	45237	48.9	71
10	Sonai	Anwar Hussain Laskar	SP	28523	33.9	Kutub Ahmed Mazumder	INC	23064	27.4	5459
11	Dholai (SC)	Parimal Suklabaidya	BJP	26284	34.7	Kamakhya Prasad Mala	IND	22930	30.3	3354
12	Udharbond	Ajit Singh	INC	30657	43.5	Joy Prakash Tewari	BJP	26668	37.8	3989
13	Lakhipur	Dinesh Prasad Goala	INC	36570	45.3	Reena Singh	BJP	26815	33.2	9755
14	Barkhola	Misbahul Islam Laskar	INC	34530	48.0	Trailakshya Bhusan Nath	BJP	31025	43.1	3505
15	Katigorah	Kali Ranjan Deb	BJP	28766	36.27	Prodip Nandy	INC	22184	27.97	6582
16	Haflong (ST)	Gobinda Chandra Langthasa	INC	33781	45.44	Prakanta Warisa	ASDC(P)	43731	29.29	12003
17	Bokajan (ST)	Jagat Sing Engti	ASDC(U)	23748	34.82	Hidhinath Rongpi	INC	20459	30.00	3289
18	Howraghat (ST)	Dharamsing Teron	ASDC(U)	27058	39.10	Rabi Kumar Phangcho	ASDC(P)	20825	30.09	6233
19	Diphu (ST)	Bidya Sing Engleng	INC	32244	33.38	Babu Rongpi	ASDC(U)	25143	26.03	7101
20	Baithalangso (ST)	Rupon Sing Ronghang	INC	39446	41.81	Haliram Terang	ASDC(U)	38469	40.77	977
21	Mankachar	Hosenara Islam	NCP	35699	36.45	Motiur Rohman Mondal	IND	32010	32.68	3689
22	Salmara South	Wazed Ali Choudhury	INC	47329	59.18	Dewan Joynal Abedin	IND	27183	33.99	20146
23	Dhubri	Nazibul Umar	INC	45113	51.21	Dhruba Kumar Sen	BJP	36847	31.54	17331
24	Gauripur	Banendra Mushahary	AGP	50624	51.12	Mohibul Hoque	INC	47332	47.80	3292
25	Golakganj	Dinesh Chandra Sarkar	BJP	48808	51.26	Alauddin Sarkar	CPI	25039	26.30	23769
26	Bilasipara West	Ali Akbar Miah	AGP	23801	29.93	Hatem Ali Choudhury	INC	21576	27.13	2225
27	Bilasipara East	Prasanta Kumar Baruah	AGP	38380	38.19	Mozibar Rahman	INC	28816	28.67	9564
28	Gossaigaon	Mithius Tudu	INC	61504	54.92	Bibhuti Bhusan Brahma	IND	40337	36.02	21167
29	Kokrajhar West (ST)	Hemendra Nath Brahma	IND	74971	71.51	Lahendra Basumatary	IND	12544	11.96	62427
30	Kokrajhar East (ST)	Pramila Rani Brahma	IND	90553	81.91	Charan Narzary	INC	14358	12.99	76195
31	Sidli (ST)	Matindra Basumatary	IND	82876	72.61	Andrias Hajoary	PDF	16550	14.50	66326
32	Bongaigaon	Phani Bhusan Choudhury	AGP	52814	61.52	Rajeswar Choudhury	INC	25954	30.23	26860
33	Bijni	Romio Brahma	IND	34449	46.09	Dhiresh Barman	INC	18267	24.44	16182
34	Abhayapuri North	Bhupen Roy	AGP	34241	43.30	Abdul Hai Nagori	IND	32774	41.45	1467
35	Abhayapuri South (SC)	Chandan Kumar Sarkar	INC	45318	50.02	Rabin Banikya	AGP	41685	46.01	3633
36	Dudhnai (ST)	Pranoy Rabha	INC	45417	51.54	Akan Rabha	AGP	33256	37.74	12161
37	Goalpara East	Shadeed Mazumder	NCP	36766	38.88	Jyotish Das	AGP	24166	25.55	12600
38	Goalpara West	Sheikh Shah Alam	NCP	27098	35.70	Abu Bakkar Siddique Jotdar	INC	13994	18.43	13104
39	Jaleswar	Aftabuddin	INC	36444	53.03	Afzalur Rahman	SAP	19849	28.88	16595
40	Sorbhog	Samsul Hoque	IND	31890	32.90	Anilananda Pathak	BJP	27819	28.70	4071
41	Bhabanipur	Sarbananda Choudhury	INC	33974	44.65	Milan Baro	IND	28409	37.34	5565
42	Patacharkuchi	Pabindra Deka	IND	16586	21.98	Manoranjan Das	IND	16487	21.85	99
43	Barpeta	Ismail Hussain	INC	46326	45.95	Kumar Deepak Das	AGP	46133	45.76	193
44	Jania	Asahaque Ali	INC	27401	33.73	A. Jalil Talukdar	IND	23995	29.54	3406
45	Baghbor	Dilder Rezza	INC	38537	57.69	Md. Raham Ali	AGP	17164	25.70	21373
46	Sarukhetri	Tara Prasad Das	IND	34782	37.97	Nizam Uddin Khan	CPI(M)	19895	21.72	14887
47	Chenga	Sukur Ali Ahmed	INC	24686	39.80	Liakat Ali	IND	23719	38.24	967
48	Boko (SC)	Gopinath Das	INC	56177	56.66	Jyoti Prasad Das	AGP	56177	33.08	23379
49	Chaygaon	Rana Goswami	INC	50675	57.48	Kamala Kanta Kalita	AGP	37482	42.52	13193
50	Palasbari	Pranab Kalita	IND	30943	37.30	Jatin Mali	AGP	30308	36.54	635
51	Jalukbari	Himanta Biswa Sarma	INC	45054	46.76	Bhrigu Phukan	NCP	35035	36.36	10019
52	Dispur	Robin Bordoloi	INC	46871	36.92	Atul Bora	IND	43492	34.26	3379
53	Gauhati East	Pankaj Bora	INC	47713	53.31	Biraj Kumar Sarma	AGP	31766	35.49	15947
54	Gauhati West	Hemanta Talukdar	INC	36471	35.26	Manoj Ram Phookun	BJP	36471	30.87	4547
55	Hajo	Haren Das	INC	40726	48.91	Nurul Hussain	AGP	30306	36.40	10420
56	Kamalpur	Uttara Kalita	AGP	37520	42.47	Satyabrat Kalita	IND	14545	16.46	22975
57	Rangia	Bhubaneswar Kalita	BJP	33308	35.09	Ananta Deka	CPI(M)	31560	33.25	1748
58	Tamulpur	Biswajit Daimary	IND	56017	53.21	Padum Chauhan	INC	39163	37.20	16854
59	Nalbari	Madan Kalita	INC	45125	47.47	Alaka Sarma	AGP	30489	32.07	14636
60	Barkhetry	Bhumidhar Barman	INC	64748	66.86	Pulakesh Barua	IND	64748	29.76	35925
61	Dharmapur	Nilamani Sen Deka	INC	37674	50.64	Chandra Mohan Patowary	AGP	36223	48.69	1451
62	Barama (ST)	Paniram Rabha	INC	34331	39.04	Nageswar Choudhury	IND	26079	29.65	8252
63	Chapaguri (ST)	Tijen Basumatary	IND	64427	70.30	Suren Swargiary	IND	7354	8.02	57073
64	Panery	Kamali Basumatari	IND	37956	51.46	Mridula Saharia	INC	21035	28.52	16921
65	Kalaigaon	Nathu Ram Boro	IND	27493	30.00	Mukul Saikia	INC	24412	26.64	3081
66	Sipajhar	Zoii Nath Sarmah	AGP	45978	49.24	Binanda Kumar Saikia	INC	45764	49.01	214
67	Mangaldoi	Basanta Das	INC	46443	44.15	Hiren Kumar Das	AGP	35467	33.72	10976
68	Dalgaon	Abdul Jabbar	AGP	45860	45.38	Anwara Taimur	INC	29131	28.82	16729
69	Udalguri (ST)	Rihon Daimary	IND	30170	38.39	Jaman Singh Brahma	INC	27847	35.43	2323
70	Majbat	Karendra Basumatary	IND	42234	57.45	Silvius Condpan	INC	28186	38.34	14048
71	Dhekiajuli	Joseph Toppo	AGP	40394	50.24	Hiranya Bora	INC	35551	44.21	4843
72	Barchalla	Tanka Bahadur Rai	INC	26567	35.79	Prafulla Goswami	AGP	17455	23.51	9112
73	Tezpur	Brindaban Goswami	AGP	30030	38.61	Robindra Kumar Goswami	INC	29036	37.33	994
74	Rangapara	Bhimananda Tanti	INC	40043	51.28	Rishilal Upadhyaya	INC	17464	22.36	22579
75	Sootea	Praneswar Basumatary	INC	43559	48.67	Padma Hazarika	AGP	42794	47.82	765
76	Biswanath	Nurjamal Sarkar	INC	39399	48.55	Prabin Hazarika	INC	35951	44.30	3448
77	Behali	Ranjit Dutta	BJP	33348	50.65	Barnabash Tanti	INC	19819	30.10	13529
78	Gohpur	Ripun Bora	INC	58850	53.23	Ganesh Kutum	AGP	48864	44.19	9986
79	Jagiroad (SC)	Bubul Das	AGP	53652	52.71	Bibekananda Dalai	INC	47380	46.55	6272
80	Marigaon	Jonjonali Baruah	INC	37521	42.07	Munin Mahanta	INC	20368	22.84	17153
81	Laharighat	Nazrul Islam	INC	45523	55.99	Woli Ullah	BJP	34636	42.60	10887
82	Raha (SC)	Ananda Ram Baruah	INC	47700	47.14	Umesh Das	BJP	32972	32.59	14728
83	Dhing	Idris Ali	INC	49703	53.06	Md. Muzibur Rahman	SP	36340	38.80	13363
84	Batadroba	Gautam Bora	INC	35078	43.53	Khagen Bordoloi	BJP	21762	27.00	13316
85	Rupohihat	Sarifa Begum	INC	37745	42.65	Md. Abdul Aziz	AGP	37210	42.04	535
86	Nowgong	Girindra Kumar Baruah	AGP	37099	43.48	Nripen Goswami	INC	37099	33.40	8603
87	Barhampur	Prafulla Kumar Mahanta	AGP	38590	44.63	Chitralekha Phukan	INC	33203	38.40	5387
88	Samaguri	Rakibul Hussain	INC	38022	48.91	Atul Kumar Sarma	AGP	34636	44.55	3386
89	Kaliabor	Gunin Hazarika	AGP	32293	46.65	Simanchal Digal	INC	31757	45.88	536
90	Jamunamukh	Khalilur Rahman Chowdhury	AGP	47255	55.53	Abdul Jalil Ragibi	INC	37614	44.20	9641
91	Hojai	Ardhendu Kumar Dey	INC	51048	47.54	Ramaprasad Sahu	BJP	44887	41.80	6161
92	Lumding	Sushil Dutta	BJP	28631	33.34	Maya Chakraborty	INC	27273	31.75	1358
93	Bokakhat	Jiten Gogoi	IND	33595	49.07	Bhupendra Nath Bhuyan	INC	25650	37.47	7945
94	Sarupathar	Alius Tirkey	INC	50038	44.22	Binod Gowala	AGP	43234	38.20	6804
95	Golaghat	Ajanta Neog	INC	52134	55.14	Atul Bora	AGP	41204	43.58	10930
96	Khumtai	Jiba Kanta Gogoi	INC	32012	45.87	Probin Kumar Gogoi	AGP	29511	42.28	2501
97	Dergaon (SC)	Hemprakash Narayan	INC	44311	52.79	Sushila Hazarika	AGP	36899	43.96	7412
98	Jorhat	Hitendra Nath Goswami	AGP	39421	49.52	Padma Nath Sarma	INC	33380	41.93	6041
99	Majuli (ST)	Rajib Lochan Pegu	INC	22608	31.61	Padmeswar Deley	IND	20208	28.25	2400
100	Titabar	Dip Gogoi	INC	33804	44.86	Hemanta Kalita	AGP	25141	33.37	8663
101	Mariani	Rupam Kurmi	INC	23010	37.16	Binode Gogoi	AGP	20177	32.58	2833
102	Teok	Membor Gogoi	INC	34462	49.98	Renupoma Rajkhowa	AGP	18628	27.02	15834
103	Amguri	Anjan Dutta	INC	40779	55.50	Prodip Hazarika	AGP	30379	41.34	10400
104	Nazira	Hemoprova Saikia	INC	44170	68.19	Cheniram Borgohain	CPI	8666	13.38	35504
105	Mahmara	Sarat Saikia	INC	44770	64.63	Hiranya Kumar Konwer	AGP	21851	31.54	22919
106	Sonari	Sarat Barkotoky	INC	59554	67.25	Babul Khatoniar	BJP	24613	27.79	34941
107	Thowra	Devanand Konwar	INC	24976	43.91	Kushal Dowari	IND	12720	22.36	12256
108	Sibsagar	Pranab Kumar Gogoi	INC	30919	41.18	Pranabjit Chaliha Ramu	IND	17957	23.92	12962
109	Bihpuria	Premadhar Bora	IND	20944	27.73	Borgoram Deuri	INC	19672	26.04	1272
110	Naoboicha	Sultan Sadik	IND	29813	31.07	Moniram Pathari	AGP	22105	23.04	7708
111	Lakhimpur	Utpal Dutta	AGP	39936	46.59	Indra Gogoi	INC	39252	45.80	684
112	Dhakuakhana (ST)	Bharat Narah	INC	41190	42.77	Deben Pegu	BJP	35414	36.77	5776
113	Dhemaji (ST)	Dilip Kumar Saikia	AGP	31166	29.25	Sumitra Patir	INC	30685	28.79	481
114	Jonai (ST)	Pradan Baruah	INC	55116	45.64	Bhubon Pegu	IND	38954	32.26	16162
115	Moran	Sarbananda Sonowal	AGP	27777	42.64	Jibontara Ghatowar	INC	26927	41.33	850
116	Dibrugarh	Kalyan Kumar Gogoi	INC	40675	67.57	Ajit Chaliha	BJP	14714	24.44	25961
117	Lahowal	Prithibi Majhi	INC	41806	68.52	Rebati Phukan	BJP	14124	23.15	27682
118	Duliajan	Rameswar Teli	BJP	34335	50.75	Amiya Gogoi	INC	26740	39.53	7595
119	Tingkhong	Atuwa Munda	INC	31743	45.37	Anup Phukan	AGP	31339	44.79	404
120	Naharkatia	Pranati Phukan	INC	42765	65.94	Kusumbar Tairai Gogoi	AGP	12730	19.63	30035
121	Chabua	Raju Sahu	INC	34801	47.65	Bhaben Baruah	AGP	20749	28.41	14052
122	Tinsukia	Rajendra Prasad Singh	INC	35496	51.49	Shio Shambhu Ojha	BJP	23412	33.96	12084
123	Digboi	Rameswar Dhanowar	INC	35418	60.22	Bhaben Sharma	BJP	17764	30.20	17654
124	Margherita	Pradyut Bordoloi	INC	48377	57.07	Debojit Boruah	BJP	22759	26.85	25618
125	Doomdooma	Dileswar Tanti	INC	52846	77.93	Pratap Tanty	AGP	14968	22.07	37878
126	Sadiya	Jagadish Bhuyan	AGP	35748	45.26	Bolin Chetia	INC	35552	45.02	196

== See also ==
- List of constituencies of the Assam Legislative Assembly
- 2001 elections in India
