= Bismita Gogoi =

Indian politician

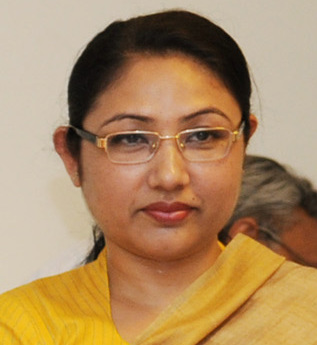
- Gogoi in 2015

Minister of State (Independent Charge), Assam
- In office 26 January 2015 – 24 May 2016
- Chief Minister: Tarun Gogoi
- Departments: Handloom, Textiles and Sericulture; Cultural Affairs; Backward Castes Welfare
- Preceded by: Pranati Phukan (Handloom, Cultural Affairs); Rajib Lochan Pegu (BC Welfare)
- Succeeded by: Ranjit Dutta (Handloom); Naba Kumar Doley (Cultural Affairs); Pramila Rani Brahma (BC Welfare)

Member, Assam Legislative Assembly
- In office 13 May 2011 – 19 May 2016
- Preceded by: Probin Gogoi
- Succeeded by: Mrinal Saikia
- Constituency: Khumtai

Personal details
- Born: 1 January 1972 (age 54) Moran, India
- Party: Bharatiya Janata Party (since 2024); Indian National Congress (until 2024)
- Spouse: Rupak Gogoi (m. 1997; died 2005)
- Parent(s): Tokheswar Saikia (father); Ahalya Saikia (mother)
- Relatives: Jiba Kanta Gogoi (father-in-law)
- Education: Dibrugarh University
- Occupation: Politician

Bismita Gogoi (née Saikia; born 1 January 1972) is an Indian politician from the state of Assam who served as the Minister of State for Cultural Affairs from 2015 to 2016. A member of the Indian National Congress prior to 2024, Gogoi was the member of Assam Legislative Assembly for Khumtai from 2011 to 2016.

Gogoi was born in Moran, Assam. She later did M.A and LLB at Dibrugarh University. She was married to Rupak Gogoi in 1997. Her husband, who was killed in 2005, was the son of Jiba Kanta Gogoi, who also served as MLA of Khumtai three times and became a minister of state, cabinet minister and later speaker.

Gogoi was elected as MLA for Khumtai in 2011. She was inducted into the Third Tarun Gogoi ministry and made Minister of Cultural Affairs, Handloom, Textile, Sericulture and Backward Classes Welfare following a cabinet reshuffle. During her tenure, she brought Sustainable Urbanism International to try to make Majuli a UNESCO World Heritage Site. She also oversaw the completion of the Bhupen Hazarika memorial. She unsuccessfully sought reelection for Khumtai in 2016 and 2021. In 2018, she was appointed General Secretary of All India Mahila Congress. She joined the Bharatiya Janata Party (BJP) in 2024.

== Early life and education ==
Bismita Gogoi was born on 1 January 1972 to the late Tokheswar Saikia and the late Ahalya Saikia. She was born in Moran. She is M.A in Sociology (1996) from Dibrugarh University. She has also completed LLB from RKB Law College under Dibrugarh University in the year 1999.

== Personal life ==
=== Social activities and interests ===
Gogoi is a Trustee of J.K.G. Memorial welfare Trust and is an advisor to a local NGO, Bandhan and Khumtai Gramin Unnayan Mancha. She enjoys doing voluntary services, reading books and handicrafts. She also enjoys watching the news.

=== Marriage and death of Rupak Gogoi ===
She married Rupak Kumar Gogoi on 12 December 1997. Her husband was the son of Jiba Kanta Gogoi, who also was MLA for Khumtai and became speaker and a minister. They had no children.

On 11 February 2005, at 8.30 pm, Rupak Gogoi travelled to his tea garden Govindapur. The labourers were expecting their three weeks worth of payment however when Gogoi came with wages for one week, the labourers turned furious. They attacked and killed him. After the incident 250 labourers surrendered themselves at Numaligarh Police Outpost. Police also arrested 8 labourers later and the total number of accused went up to 258 . After investigation, the police filed charges against 79 accused. Before the trial, 9 of the accused had died leaving the number of accused to 70.

On 27 June 2012, the court announced that 57 of the 70 accused were to be acquitted. The remaining 13 were given life imprisonment. Bismita Gogoi expressed satisfaction at the decision.

== Political career ==
=== Early political career ===
In the 2011 Assam Legislative Assembly election, Gogoi was the Indian National Congress candidate for Khumtai. She secured 41123 votes, defeating her nearest opponent by 18389 votes and became MLA for Khumtai, succeeding Probin Gogoi. She was one of 14 female candidates to win in the election.

When Chief Minister Tarun Gogoi was constituting his third ministry, she along with several other newly elected MLAs, expressed their wishes that they did not want to be in the ministerial race. She said "I am happy to be in the assembly only and I am not in any kind of race. All I want is guidance from my seniors".

In January 2012, Gogoi was one of 5 MLAs from Assam who were part of a team organised by Rahul Gandhi, to help congress candidates in Uttar Pradesh. She attended an orientation discourse by Jitendra Singh, before she went to her allocated constituency, Akbarpur.

On 23 January 2013, she attended the inauguration of a new building of Athkhelia Namghar. On 29 May, she was present at the public meeting held on the occasion of laying the foundations of Khumtai Model Hospital and Khumtai-Lengera Chapori Road.

=== Culture Minister ===
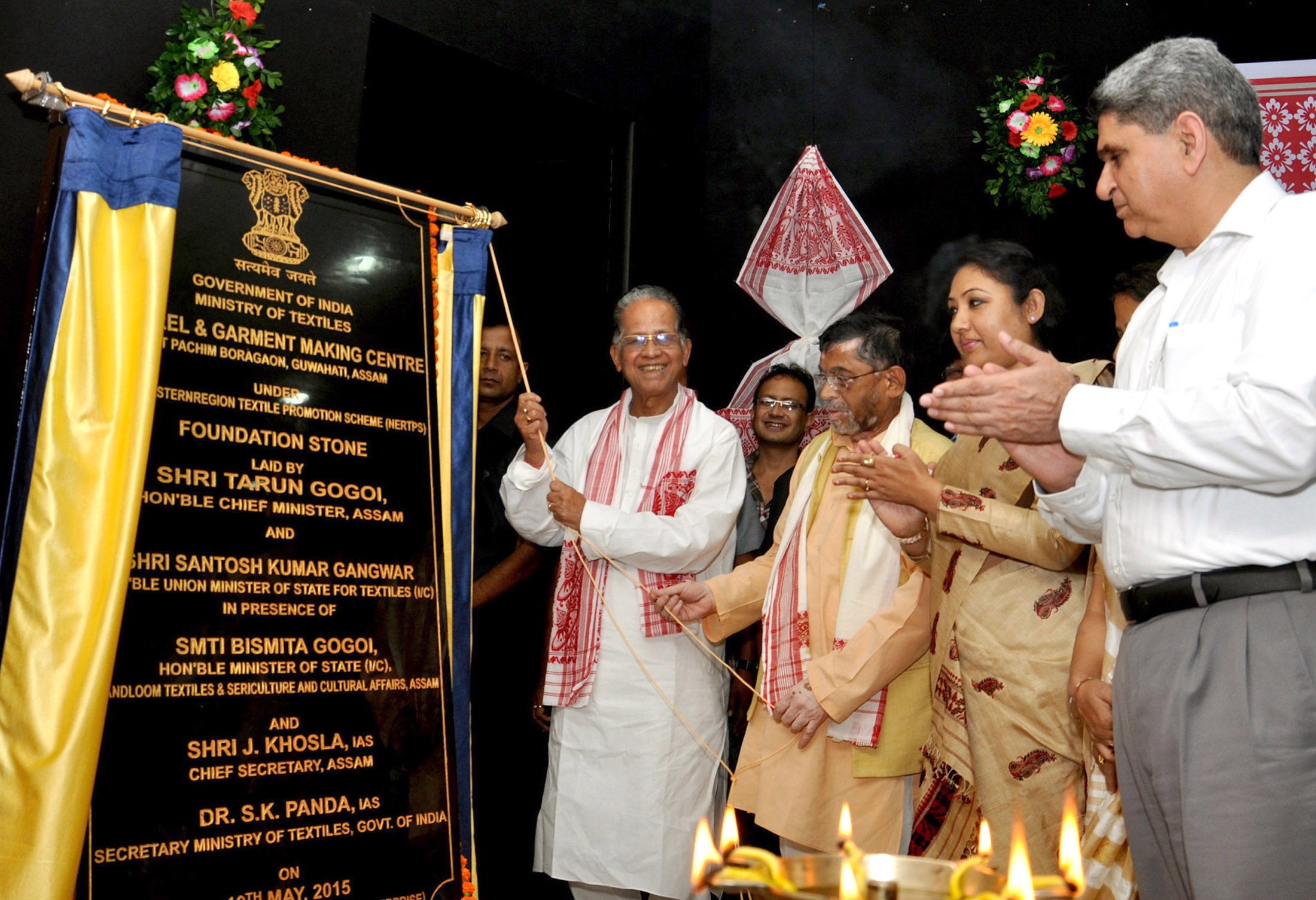
Bismita Gogoi, with Chief Minister Tarun Gogoi and Textiles minister Santosh Gangwar unveiling a plaque for an apparel and garment making centre in Guwahati, on 19 May 2015

Following a cabinet reshuffle in the Tarun Gogoi ministry, Bismita Gogoi was made Minister of state for Cultural Affairs, Handloom, Textile, Sericulture and Backward Classes Welfare (with independent charge), succeeding Pranati Phukan. Gogoi was sworn in by Governor Padmanabha Acharya on the 23 January 2015 at Raj Bhavan.

Following the death of Indra Bania, he was laid to rest with full state honours, and Gogoi mourned the actor's death.

In June 2015, after the government response to artist pension scheme was said to fail to include colleagues who died unsung, Gogoi stated "We already have a pension scheme that is given out monthly and one at a time. There are so many artists in Assam. We want to help those who have excelled in an art form."

After the ASI prepared dossiers in 2004, 2008, and 2012 to try to make Majuli a UNESCO world heritage site, who were all rejected, Gogoi said that the state government would find a new consultant to prepare a new dossier. Gogoi therefore tried to bring in Sustainable Urbanism International. The Union Minister for water resources, Uma Bharati, criticised the state government for delaying the preparation of a dossier for Majuli. Gogoi responded by saying "The process to put forward Majuli's candidature as a Unesco World Heritage Site has already begun. A team from Sustainable Urbanism visited Majuli between December 3 and 6. Such processes take time. The ASI has said it will not be involved as Majuli is not its property."

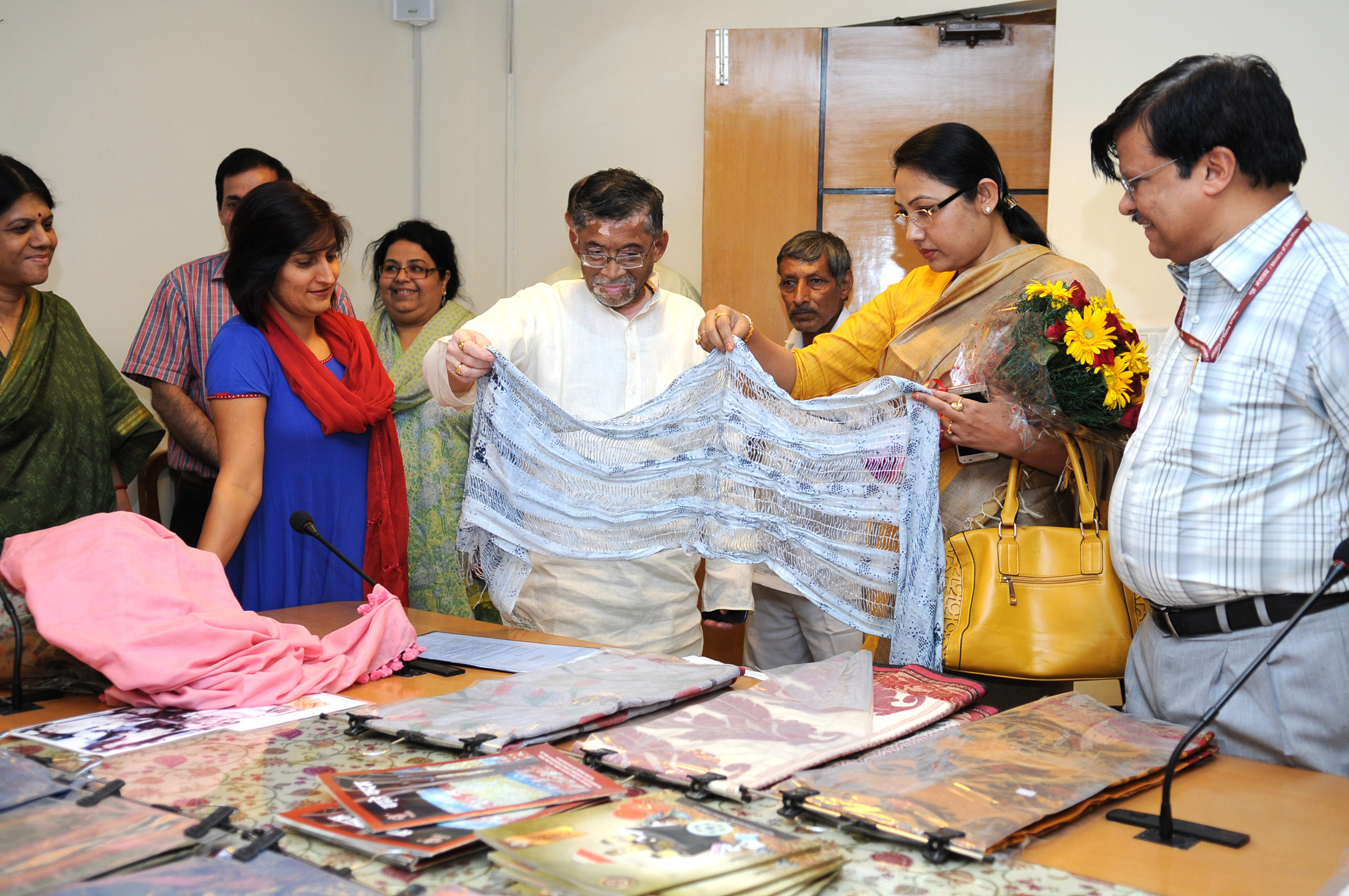
Gogoi with Santosh Gangwar, visiting an exhibition on handloom products on 6 May 2015

In August 2015, Gogoi replied to the confusion over the construction of the memorial of Khagen Mahanta. She stated "His family members want the plot of land to be developed into a park. They said they would like to design it. We can go forward with the project once it is formulated by his family."

In November 2015, on the 4th anniversary of the death of Bhupen Hazarika, Gogoi unveiled the much-awaited Bhupen Hazarika memorial. Paying tribute to him, she stated "We have dedicated his memorial site to the people. Today, we are honouring him. The presence of so many people proves that he is alive."

On 25 November 2015, she attended the celebration of Lachit Diwas. During the event, dignitaries placed floral tributes on the statue of Lachit Borphukan.

She also helped introduce Mumai Tamuly Barbarua Karna Sanskriti Abhijan, an entrepreneurial scheme which she ran for 3 years.

In the 2016 Assam Legislative Assembly election, she sought reelection in Khumtai. She polled 40763 votes, 39.09% of the total vote. She lost to BJP candidate and the current MLA for Khumtai, Mrinal Saikia, by 16874 votes. She was one of 10 cabinet ministers who lost in the 2016 Assam Legislative Assembly Election.

=== Post-Ministerial career ===
On 12 November 2017, she took part in a protest along with many members of the Indian National Congress including Tarun Gogoi, Ripun Bora, Ajanta Neog and Rakibul Hussain for the disclosure of the contents of the framework agreement signed by the Centre and the National Socialist Council of Nagaland.

On 20 January 2018, she was appointed General Secretary of All India Mahila Congress in Assam.

On 23 September 2020, Gogoi took part in a protest against the passing of the farm bills while also demanding the withdrawal of the suspension of 8 Rajya Sabha MPs.

==== 2021 election ====
Gogoi lost in the 2021 Assam Legislative Assembly Election against BJP candidate Mrinal Saikia. She criticised the election commission for the violence in the election. She stated "election is not above human life. If anyone can't give life, he also has no right to take other's life," while pointing at the BJP's Khumtai MLA Mrinal Saikia. Gogoi alleged that the Election Commission is yet to take any action against incidents of elected-related violence reported on a daily basis in her constituency.

She obtained 38522 votes, 33.14% of the total vote. She again lost to Mrinal Saikia, by 27133 votes.

==== Defection to BJP ====
In April 2022, it was speculated by the media that Gogoi would defect to BJP in the presence of Prime Minister Narendra Modi, but this did not end up occurring.

On 27 January 2024, Gogoi resigned from the Indian National Congress in a letter to Bhupen Bora. The following day on 28 January, she defected to BJP.

== Positions held ==
- 2011: Member, Assam Legislative Assembly
- 2015: Minister of state (Independent Charge), Government of Assam
- 2018: General Secretary, All India Mahila Congress
