= Dhiraj Gowala =

Indian politician (born 1982)

Dhiraj Gowala (born 1982) is an Indian politician from the northeastern state of Assam. He is a member of the Assam Legislative Assembly from the Titabor Assembly constituency in Jorhat district representing the Bharatiya Janata Party.

== Early life and education ==
Gowala is from Titabor, Joorhat district, Assam. He is the son of Premo Gowala. He studied Class 12 at Mariani College and passed the examinations conducted by Assam Higher Secondary Education Council (AHSEC) in 2004. He runs his own business. He declared assets worth Rs.85 lakhs in his affidavit to the Election Commission of India.

== Career ==
Gowala won the Titabor Assembly constituency representing the Bharatiya Janata Party in the 2026 Assam Legislative Assembly election. He polled 78,743 votes and defeated his nearest rival, Pran Kurmi of the Indian National Congress, by a margin of 23,315 votes.
