= Bishnu Prasad =

Indian politician

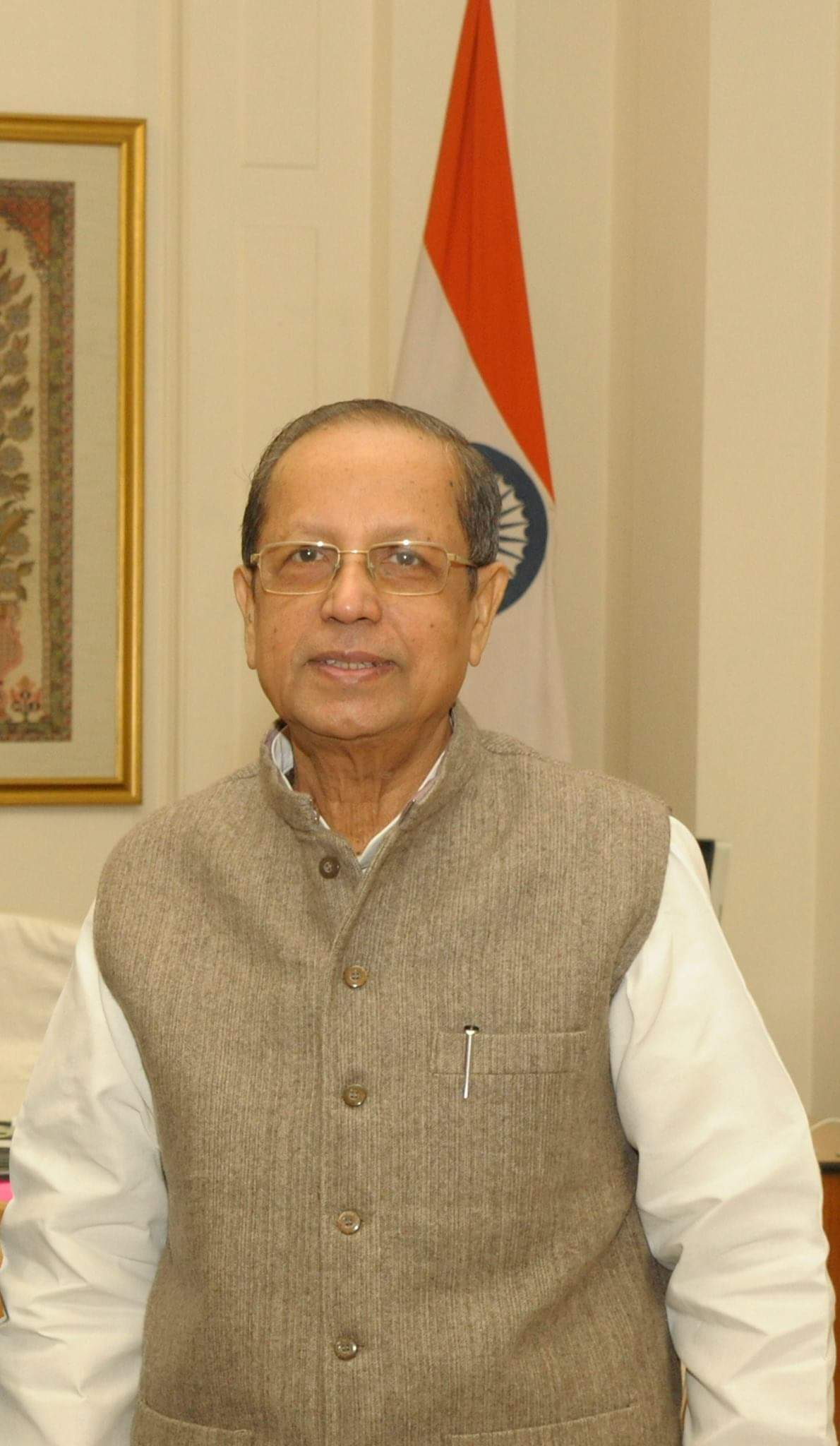

Member of Parliament, Lok Sabha
- In office 1980-1984
- Preceded by: Bedabrata Barua
- Succeeded by: Bhadreswar Tanti
- Constituency: Kaliabor Constituency, Assam

Personal details
- Born: Assam
- Party: Indian National Congress
- Spouse: Priti
- Children: 2 sons and a daughter
- Education: Gauhati University

Bishnu Prasad is an Indian politician. He was elected to the Lok Sabha, lower house of the Parliament of India from the Kaliabor Constituency of Assam as a member of the Indian National Congress. He was elected to, Assam Legislative Assembly from Samaguri (Vidhan Sabha constituency) in 1972 & was the Minister for Industry, Power, Irrigation, Flood Control, Trade and Commerce and Cooperative, Assam (1972–76); Chairman, Assam Financial Corporation, 1981–83; Chairman, Estimates Committee, Assam, Legislative Assembly, 1976–78. He was also the Chairman National Commission for Linguistic Minorities in India Government of India, a Constitutional Office under Article 350-B of the Constitution, 1988–90. He was a Member, Governing Body, Indian Council of World Affairs; Member, Governing Council, Indian Law Institute, New Delhi. Further he was the National Vice President, India-Russia Friendship Society.

== Political life ==
He was General Secretary, 1967–69 and President, 1969–74, of Assam Pradesh Youth Congress. Thereafter, he was General Secretary, 1978–1983, & Vice President, 1983-2020 of Assam Pradesh Congress Committee. He is a Member of All India Congress Committee since 1972.

== Early life ==
He did his matriculation from Nagaon Government High School and Graduated from Cotton College and his post graduation M.A. & LL B from Gauhati University.

He was the founder General Secretary of Cotton College Hostel Boarders Association, 1961 & founder General Secretary of Assam Non-party Student's Association, 1960. He is an Advocate and had joined the Gauhati High Court in the year 1969 and subsequently joined the Supreme Court of India in the year 1985. He is a Member of the Indian Arbitration Council.

== Writings ==
His writings have appeared in dailies and literary journals since 1960 and he has authored 2 books "Modar Phular Gondh", 1974 & "Smriti Aru Chinta", 1990.
