= Nilima Devi =

Indian politician (born 1965)

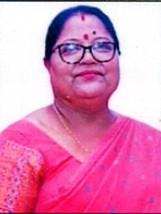

Cabinet Minister, Assam
- Incumbent
- Assumed office 5 June 2026
- Chief Minister: Himanta Biswa Sarma
- Departments: Animal Husbandry and Veterinary; Fisheries
- Preceded by: Himanta Biswa Sarma

Member, Assam Legislative Assembly
- Incumbent
- Assumed office 4 May 2026
- Preceded by: Basanta Das
- Constituency: Mangaldai

Personal details
- Party: Bharatiya Janata Party

Nilima Devi (born 1965) is an Indian politician from Assam. She is a Member of the Legislative Assembly from Mangaldai Assembly constituency in Darrang district representing the Bharatiya Janata Party.

Devi is from Darrang district, Assam. She completed her graduation in 2013 at K.K. Handique State Open University. She is the wife of Mahesh Chandra Sarma, a retired government employee.

Devi became an MLA for the first time winning the 2026 Assam Legislative Assembly election from Mangaldai Assembly constituency representing the Bharatiya Janata Party. She polled 1,00,078 votes and defeated her nearest rival, Rijumoni Talukdar of the Indian National Congress, by a margin of 23,936 votes.
