= Chandan Kumar Sarkar =

Indian politician

- চন্দন কুমাৰ সৰকাৰ
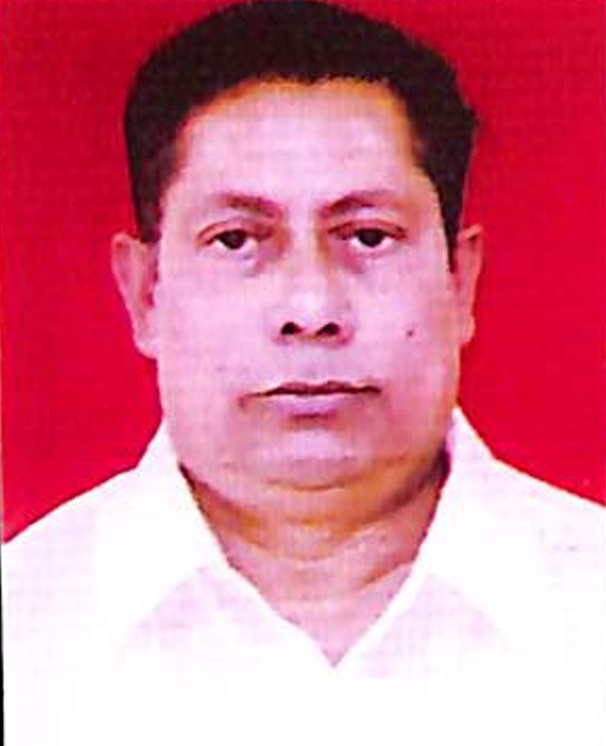

Cabinet Minister, Assam
- In office 26 January 2015 – 24 May 2016
- Chief Minister: Tarun Gogoi
- Departments: Irrigation; Soil Conservation
- Preceded by: Nilamani Sen Deka
- Succeeded by: Ranjit Dutta (Irrigation); Pramila Rani Brahma (Soil Conservation)

Member, Assam Legislative Assembly for Abhayapuri South
- In office 1991–1996
- Preceded by: Ratneswar Sarkar
- Succeeded by: Rabin Banikya
- In office 2001–2006
- Preceded by: Rabin Banikya
- Succeeded by: Rabin Banikya
- In office 2011–2016
- Preceded by: Rabin Banikya
- Succeeded by: Ananta Kumar Malo

Personal details
- Died: 19 November 2018 (aged 65) Lower Assam Hospital, Bongaigaon
- Party: Indian National Congress
- Spouse: Swapna Rani Sarkar
- Children: 3, including Pradip
- Occupation: Politician and Businessman

Chandan Kumar Sarkar (died 19 November 2018) was an Indian politician from the state of Assam. He served as the Minister of Irrigation and Soil Conservation in the Third Tarun Gogoi Ministry from 2015 to 2016. He was a member of the Assam Legislative Assembly from Abhayapuri South constituency from 1991 to 1996, 2001 to 2006 and again from 2011 to 2016. His son Pradip Sarkar is the current MLA from Abhayapuri South Assembly constituency.

== Early life and education ==
Sarkar was the son of late Bijoy Chandra Sarkar. He studied at Chakla Higher Secondary School, completing his H.S.L.C. in 1974.

== Political career ==
Sarkar was the Indian National Congress candidate for Abhayapuri South in the 1991 state election. He received 22311 votes, 32.58% of the total vote.

In the 1996 Assam Legislative Assembly election, Sarkar received 16977 votes, 22.24% of the total vote. He lost to AGP candidate Rabin Banikya by 26572 votes.

In the 2001 Assam Legislative Assembly election, he received 45318 votes, 50.02% of the total vote and again became MLA of Abhayapuri South. He defeated Banikya by 3633 votes.

In the 2006 Assam Legislative Assembly election, he received 26638 votes and again lost to Banikya by 4034 votes.

In the 2011 Assam Legislative Assembly election he was the Indian National Congress candidate again for Abhayapuri South, he defeated his nearest opponent by 15899 votes. On 23 January, in a cabinet reshuffle, Sarkar was made minister for Irrigation and Soil Conservation in the Tarun Gogoi cabinet.

In the 2016 Assam Legislative Assembly election, he lost to Ananta Kumar Malo by 191 votes. He was one of 10 cabinet ministers who lost in the election.

== Personal life and death ==
Sarkar and his wife had 2 sons and 1 daughter. His son Pradip, also became an MLA for Abhayapuri South, in 2021.

On 19 November 2018, Sarkar suffered a cardiac arrest in Bongaigaon. He was rushed to a hospital where he later died.

Several politicians paid tribute to Sarkar such as Ripun Bora, Himanta Biswa Sarma and Chief Minister Sarbananda Sonowal. Sonowal said “As a minister of the previous Congress government, Sarkar had rendered valuable services, which would always be remembered by the people and his death is an irreparable loss to society.”
