= Titabor Assembly constituency =

Constituency of the Assam legislative assembly in India

Titabor
- Constituency No. 102 for the Assam Legislative Assembly

Constituency details
- Country: India
- Region: Northeast India
- State: Assam
- District: Jorhat
- Lok Sabha constituency: Jorhat
- Established: 1951
- Reservation: None

Titabor Assembly constituency is one of the 126 assembly constituencies of Assam a north east state of India. Titabar is part of Jorhat Lok Sabha constituency.

== Members of the Legislative Assembly ==
Election	Member	Party affiliation
1952	Sarju Prasad Singh	All People's Party
1957	Sarbeswar Bardoloi	Indian National Congress
1962	Sarbeswar Bardoloi	Indian National Congress
1967	D. Sarmah	Indian National Congress
1972	Joy Chandra Bora	Indian National Congress
1978	Giridhar Thengal	Communist Party of India
1983	Joy Chandra Bora	Indian National Congress
1985	Deba Kumar Bora	Independent politician
1991	Mahendra Bora	Indian National Congress
1996	Hemanta Kalita	Asom Gana Parishad
2001	Dip Gogoi	Indian National Congress
2001^	Tarun Gogoi	Indian National Congress
2006	Tarun Gogoi	Indian National Congress
2011	Tarun Gogoi	Indian National Congress
2016	Tarun Gogoi	Indian National Congress
2021	Bhaskar Jyoti Baruah	Indian National Congress
2026	Dhiraj Gowala	Bharatiya Janata Party

== Election results ==
=== 2026 ===
2026 Assam Legislative Assembly election: Titabor
Party	Candidate	Votes	%	±%
BJP	Dhiraj Gowala	78,743	47.51	
INC	Pran Kurmi	55,428	33.44	
Independent	Bhaskar Jyoti Baruah	27,203	16.41	
AAP	Pallab Saikia	1,876	1.13	
NOTA	NOTA	2,489	1.5	
Margin of victory				
Turnout		165,739		
Rejected ballots				
Registered electors				
BJP gain from INC		Swing		

=== 2021 ===
2021 Assam Legislative Assembly election: Titabar
Party	Candidate	Votes	%	±%
INC	Bhaskar Jyoti Baruah	64,303	52.89	−1.75
BJP	Hemanta Kalita	50,924	41.89	+2.66
AJP	Sailendra Kumar Hazarika	3,885	3.2	N/A
Independent	Dilip Gogoi	901	0.74	+0.07
NOTA	None of the above	1,562	1.28	−0.24
Majority		13,379	11.00	−4.41
Turnout		1,21,575	77.65	−5.78
INC hold		Swing		

=== 2016 ===
2016 Assam Legislative Assembly election: Titabar
Party	Candidate	Votes	%	±%
INC	Tarun Gogoi	62,025	54.64	−19.48
BJP	Kamakhya Prasad Tasa	44,530	39.23	+34.41
CPI	Kula Das	2,413	2.12	−1.40
BVM	Biren Gogoi	1,332	1.17	N/A
Independent	Dilip Gogoi	763	0.67	−1.34
Independent	Smritirekha Shyam	715	0.62	N/A
NOTA	None of the above	1,726	1.52	N/A
Majority		17,495	15.41	−46.00
Turnout		1,13,504	83.43	+11.35
INC hold		Swing		

=== 2011 ===
2011 Assam Legislative Assembly election: Titabar
Party	Candidate	Votes	%	±%
INC	Tarun Gogoi	65,418	74.12	+8.97
AGP	Montu Moni Dutta	11,219	12.71	N/A
BJP	Kaminish Deori	4,257	4.82	−1.44
CPI	Kula Das	3,108	3.52	−13.02
Independent	Dilip Gogoi	1,775	2.01	N/A
AITC	Biren Gogoi	927	1.05	N/A
AIUDF	Subodh Dutta	905	1.03	N/A
NCP	Manashi Bordoloi	648	0.73	N/A
Majority		54,199	61.41	+12.80
Turnout		88,257	72.08	+1.27
INC hold		Swing		

=== 2006 ===
Assam Legislative Assembly election, 2006: Titabar
Party	Candidate	Votes	%	±%
INC	Tarun Gogoi	56,957	65.15	
CPI	Kula Das	14,456	16.54	
AGP(P)	Hemanta Kalita	10,536	12.05	
BJP	Karabi Chakraborty	5,469	6.26	
Majority		42,501	48.61	
Turnout		87,418	70.81	
INC hold		Swing		

== See also ==
- Titabar
- List of constituencies of Assam Legislative Assembly
