= Jaleswar Assembly constituency =

Jaleswar Assembly constituency may refer to

- Jaleswar, Assam Assembly constituency
- Jaleswar, Odisha Assembly constituency
