= Jiba Kanta Gogoi =

Indian politician

Minister for Finance and Municipal Administration
- In office 1992–1996
- Chief Minister: Hiteswar Saikia

Speaker of Assam Legislative Assembly
- In office 29 July 1991 – 9 December 1992
- Deputy: Debesh Chandra Chakravorty
- Preceded by: Pulakesh Barua
- Succeeded by: Debesh Chandra Chakravorty

Minister of State for Industries, Sports and Youth Welfare
- In office 1984–1985
- Chief Minister: Hiteswar Saikia

Member of Assam Legislative Assembly
- In office 25 May 2001 – 2 July 2002
- Preceded by: Probin Gogoi
- Succeeded by: Probin Gogoi
- Constituency: Khumtai
- In office 28 July 1991 – 11 June 1996
- Preceded by: Probin Gogoi
- Succeeded by: Probin Gogoi
- Constituency: Khumtai
- In office 1983 – 28 December 1985
- Preceded by: Nogen Borua
- Succeeded by: Probin Gogoi
- Constituency: Khumtai

Personal details
- Born: 23 April 1941
- Died: 2 July 2002 (aged 61) Guwahati, Assam, India
- Party: Indian National Congress
- Spouse: Bandana Gogoi
- Children: 2
- Relatives: Bismita Gogoi (daughter in law)
- Occupation: Politician

Jiba Kanta Gogoi (23 April 1941 – 2 July 2002) was an Indian National Congress politician from Assam. He served as Speaker of the Assam Legislative Assembly and twice as minister in the Hiteswar Saikia cabinets.

== Early life ==
Jiba Kanta Gogoi was born on 23 April 1941, to Sambhu Ram Gogoi and Joya Gogoi.

== Education and early career ==
Gogoi had a degree in law. He was the editor of the Assam Express, Sadiniya Nagarik, The Weekly Express and Natun Asomiya before his entry to politics. He also authored a number of books, including novels, poetry collections and travelogues.

== Political career ==
Gogoi was the Indian National Congress candidate for the constituency of Khumtai in the 1983 Assam Legislative Assembly Election. He received 934 votes, 94.63% of the total vote. He defeated his nearest opponent by 881 votes and became MLA of the constituency. He was inducted into the first Hiteswar Saikia cabinet as a minister of state for Industries, Sports and Youth Welfare.

Gogoi sought reelection in Khumtai in the 1985 Assam Legislative Assembly Election. He received 16427 votes, 31.54% of the total vote. He lost to AGP candidate, Probin Gogoi, by 15740 votes.

In the 1991 Assam Legislative Assembly election, Gogoi was again the Indian National Congress candidate for Khumtai. He obtained 19544 votes, 36.66% of the total vote. He defeated his nearest opponent, incumbent MLA Probin Gogoi, by 3087 votes. He was appointed speaker of Assam Legislative Assembly on 29 July 1991. After Zoii Nath Sarma tabled a motion of no confidence against the second Hiteswar Saikia ministry, Gogoi fixed the discussion for the 17 September 1991. After the army was deployed to deal with the ULFA, Opposition members demanded there be a discussion on the deployment of the army, which led to much disruption in the house. Gogoi, after finding no alternative, adjourned the house sine dine, which meant the motion of no confidence couldn’t be taken up for disposal. He also chaired the second motion of no-confidence against the Hiteswar Saikia ministry. He served as speaker until the 9 December 1992. After the end of his speakership, he was made minister for Finance and Municipal Administration and served until the end of the ministry.

In the 1996 Assam Legislative Assembly election, Gogoi did not receive the Congress nomination.

In the 2001 Assam Legislative Assembly election, Gogoi was again the Congress candidate for Khumtai. He received 32012 votes, 45.87% of the total vote and again became MLA for Khumtai. He defeated Probin Gogoi by 2501 votes.

== Personal life and death ==
Gogoi was married to Bandana Gogoi and they had two sons together. His son Rupak Gogoi was killed in 2005. Rupak was married to Bismita Gogoi, who also became the Member of the Assam Legislative Assembly for Khumtai.

Jiba Kanta Gogoi died after a prolonged illness on 2 July 2002. He, at the time, was still a sitting Congress MLA. Many politicians went to the residence of Gogoi and paid tribute by placing wreaths on his body. Chief Minister Tarun Gogoi, Speaker Prithibi Majhi and Assam Pradesh Congress Committee President Pawan Singh Ghatowar, all expressed grief at the loss of Gogoi.
