= Pradip Sarkar =

Pradip Sarkar or Pradeep Sarkar may refer to:

- Pradip Sarkar (Assam politician), an Indian politician
- Pradip Sarkar (West Bengal politician), an Indian politician
- Pradeep Sarkar (1955–2023), Indian film director
