= Nijanur Rahman =

Indian politician

Nizanur Rahman

Member of the Assam Legislative Assembly
- Incumbent
- Assumed office 2016
- Preceded by: Banendra Mushahary
- Constituency: Gauripur

Personal details
- Born: Assam, India
- Party: All India United Democratic Front

Nizanur Rahman is an All India United Democratic Front politician from Assam. He was elected to the Assam Legislative Assembly in the 2016 election from Gauripur constituency.
