= Gauripur Assembly constituency =

Assembly constituency of Assam

Coordinates: 26.09°N 89.96°E

Gauripur
- Constituency No. 7 for the Assam Legislative Assembly

Constituency details
- Country: India
- Region: Northeast India
- State: Assam
- Division: Lower Assam
- District: Dhubri
- Lok Sabha constituency: Dhubri
- Established: 1957
- Reservation: None

Member of Legislative Assembly
- 16th Assam Legislative Assembly
- Incumbent Abdus Sobahan Ali Sarkar
- Party: Indian National Congress
- Elected year: 2026

Gauripur Assembly constituency is one of the 126 constituencies of the Assam Legislative Assembly. Gauripur is part of the Dhubri Lok Sabha constituency.

== Members of Legislative Assembly ==
Year	Winner	Party
1957	Prakritish Chandra Barua	Independent politician
1962	Syed Ahmed Ali	Indian National Congress
1967	Mohammad Azad Ali	Praja Socialist Party
1972	Syed Ahmed Ali	Indian National Congress
1978	Mohammad Azad Ali	Janata Party
1983	Joynal Abedin	Indian National Congress
1985	Aniruddha Singha Chowdhury	Independent politician
1991	Mohibul Haque	Indian National Congress
1996	Banendra Mushahary	Independent politician
2001	Banendra Mushahary	Asom Gana Parishad
2006	Mohibul Haque	Independent politician
2011	Banendra Mushahary	Bodoland People's Front
2016	Nijanur Rahman	All India United Democratic Front
2021	Nijanur Rahman	All India United Democratic Front
2026	Abdus Sobahan Ali Sarkar	Indian National Congress

== Election result ==
=== 2026 ===
2026 Assam Legislative Assembly election: Gauripur
Party	Candidate	Votes	%	±%
INC	Abdus Sobahan Ali Sarkar	182,971	61.12	+61.12
AIUDF	Nijanur Rahman	63,874	21.34	−39.73
AGP	Mehetabul Haque	33,142	11.07	N/A
RD	Abul Miah	12,467	4.16	N/A
RPI(A)	Saidur Rahman Sarkar	447	0.15	N/A
RUC	Firuzul Islam	432	0.14	N/A
CPI	Sheikh Monshur Rahman	2,352	0.79	N/A
Independent	Afzal Hossain	1,222	0.41	N/A
Independent	Jabbar Ali	601	0.20	N/A
NOTA	None of the above	1,845	0.62	−0.34
Majority		119,097	39.78	−8.63
Turnout		299,353		
Registered electors				
INC gain from AIUDF		Swing		

=== 2021 ===
2021 Assam Legislative Assembly election: Gauripur
Party	Candidate	Votes	%	±%
AIUDF	Nijanur Rahman	112,194	61.07	+14.41
BJP	Banendra Mushahary	63,349	34.48	New
NOTA	None of the above	1,758	0.96	+0.07
Independent	Abdur Rezzak Hossain	1,758	0.96	New
Majority		48,845	26.59	+24.30
Turnout		1,83,727	89.17	−0.63
Registered electors		2,05,588		
AIUDF hold		Swing		

=== 2016 ===
2016 Assam Legislative Assembly election: Gauripur
Party	Candidate	Votes	%	±%
AIUDF	Nijanur Rahman	73,423	45.66	+17.74
BPF	Banendra Mushahary	53,512	33.27	−7.16
INC	Sushil Roy	23,102	14.36	−7.00
Independent	Sukumar Roy	5,420	3.37	N/A
NOTA	None of the above	1,447	0.89	N/A
Majority		19,911	12.39	−0.12
Turnout		1,60,797	89.80	+3.88
Registered electors		1,79,042		
AIUDF gain from BPF		Swing		

=== 2011 ===
2011 Assam Legislative Assembly election: Gauripur
Party	Candidate	Votes	%	±%
BPF	Banendra Mushahary	53,849	40.43	
AIUDF	Nijanur Rahman	37,190	27.92	
INC	Mahibul Haque	28,444	21.36	
AGP	Ashok Roy Pradhani	4,136	3.11	
Independent	Nurul Islam Sheikh	2,531	1.90	
AITC	Zahirul Hoque	2,315	1.74	
BJP	Biswajit Roy	2,258	1.70	
Majority		16,659	12.51	
Turnout		1,33,189	85.92	
Registered electors		1,55,015		
BPF gain from Independent		Swing		
