= Chandmama =

Village in Assam, India

Chandmama is a village in Barpeta district, in the Indian state of Assam. It is located in the southwest corner of the district, which has its headquarters in Barpeta. The village is divided into three parts: Chandmama Pather, Chandmama K, and Chandmama Gaon.

== History ==
According to the Kalika Puran and Bongbhashi, the village was established in 1205. It was originally named Chandmimi (an Assamese word meaning "small moon"). It was later renamed Chandmama by Muslims with roots in East Bengal.

== Demographics ==
The village's population is primarily Muslim, descended from people from the Pabna and Mymensingh districts of British India. They have now fully integrated into the indigenous Assamese culture. The village has a large population of 282,747, with 140,747 males and the remainder females.

== Notable people ==
- Ala Baksha Sarkar (Freedom fighter)
- Taimuddin Haji (Freedom fighter)
- Ayan Pramanik
- Majitullah Sarkar
- Rahim Baksha Dewani
- Jahar Akand
- Haji Mahiruddin
- Bahaj Uddin Akand
- Alhaj Golam Mowla Baksha (Freedom fighter)
- Sahab Uddin Ahmed
- Haji Jahabaksha Bhuyan
- Haji Alabaksha (Freedom fighter)
- Prof Hazrat Bakshi
- Dr. Arifur Rahman

== Education ==
There are more than ten government lower primary schools and more than ten upper primary schools currently operating in the village.
