= Raju Sahu =

Indian politician from Assam

Member of the Assam Legislative Assembly
- In office 2001–2016
- Preceded by: Bhaben Baruah
- Succeeded by: Binod Hazarika
- Constituency: Chabua

Personal details
- Party: Indian National Congress
- Education: Tinsukia College
- Profession: Politician

Raju Sahu is an Indian politician from Assam. He was elected three times as a Member of the Legislative Assembly from Chabua constituency, as a member of the Indian National Congress, in the 2001, 2006, and 2011 Assam Legislative Assembly elections.
