= Basanta Das =

Former Cabinet Minister of Assam

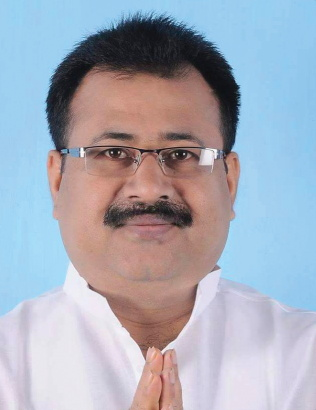
- Official portrait

Cabinet Minister, Assam
- In office 26 January 2015 – 24 May 2016
- Chief Minister: Tarun Gogoi
- Departments: Fisheries; Water Resources; Scheduled Castes Welfare
- Preceded by: Self (Fisheries); Rajib Lochan Pegu (Water Resources, SC Welfare)
- Succeeded by: Parimal Suklabaidya (Fisheries); Keshab Mahanta (Water Resources)

Minister of State (Independent Charge), Assam
- In office 26 January 2015 – 24 May 2016
- Chief Minister: Tarun Gogoi
- Departments: Fisheries; Information and Public Relations; Printing and Stationery
- Preceded by: Nurjamal Sarkar (Fisheries); Rakibul Hussain (IPR, Printing)
- Succeeded by: Self (Fisheries); Tarun Gogoi (IPR, Printing)

Member, Assam Legislative Assembly
- In office 2021–2016
- Preceded by: Gurujyoti Das
- Constituency: Mangaldoi
- In office 2011–2016
- Preceded by: Hiren Kumar Das
- Succeeded by: Gurujyoti Das
- In office 2001–2006
- Preceded by: Hiren Kumar Das
- Succeeded by: Hiren Kumar Das

Personal details
- Party: Bharatiya Janata Party (2026–present)
- Other political affiliations: Indian National Congress (2001–2026)
- Education: Darrang College

Basanta Das is an Indian National Congress politician from Assam. He has been elected to the Assam Legislative Assembly representing the Mangaldoi constituency. He also served as a cabinet minister in the Third Tarun Gogoi Ministry (from 2011-2016), overseeing the following ministries:

- Ministry of Fisheries
- Ministry of Printing
- Ministry of Stationery and Information
- Ministry of Public Relations
- Ministry of Water Resources
- Ministry of Scheduled Castes Welfare

On 5 March 2026, after having been suspended from the Congress, Das joined the Bharatiya Janata Party in time for the 2026 Assam Legislative Assembly election.
