= Chabua–Lahowal Assembly constituency =

Constituency of the Assam legislative assembly in India

Coordinates: 27.48°N 95.17°E

Chabua
- Constituency No. 121 for the Assam Legislative Assembly

Constituency details
- Country: India
- Region: Northeast India
- State: Assam
- District: Dibrugarh
- Lok Sabha constituency: Lakhimpur
- Established: 1978
- Reservation: None
- Elected year: 2021

Chabua Assembly constituency was one of the 126 assembly constituencies of Assam Legislative Assembly. Chabua formed part of the Lakhimpur Lok Sabha constituency.

This constituency was renamed to Chabua–Lahowal in 2023.

== Members of Legislative Assembly ==
Election	Member	Party
1978	Jnan Gogoi	Janata Party
1983	Upendra Sanatan	Indian National Congress
1985	Bhuban Barua	Independent
1991	Upendra Sanatan	Indian National Congress
1996	Bhaben Baruah	Asom Gana Parishad
2001	Raju Sahu	Indian National Congress
2006	Raju Sahu	Indian National Congress
2011	Raju Sahu	Indian National Congress
2016	Binod Hazarika	Bharatiya Janata Party
2021	Ponakan Baruah	Asom Gana Parishad

== Election results ==
=== 2026 ===
2026 Assam Legislative Assembly election: Chabua-Lahowal
Party	Candidate	Votes	%	±%
BJP	Binod Hazarika	89202	60.75	
INC	Pranjal Ghatowar	38288	26.08	
JMM	BHUPEN SINGH MURARI	13265	9.03	
NOTA	NOTA	3820	2.6	
Margin of victory		50914		
Turnout		146834		
Rejected ballots				
Registered electors				
BJP gain from INC		Swing		

=== 2021 ===
2021 Assam Legislative Assembly election: Chabua
Party	Candidate	Votes	%	±%
AGP	Ponakan Baruah	53,554	41.4	N/A
INC	Ajoy Phukan	34,824	26.92	−6.28
Independent	Priyanka Neog	16,700	12.91	N/A
Independent	Bhaben Baruah	11,793	9.12	N/A
Independent	Lawrance Nag	3,926	3.04	N/A
RLSP	Prakash Tanti	2,761	2.13	N/A
LJP	Ananta Hazarika	2,463	1.9	N/A
NOTA	None of the above	3,332	2.58	
Majority		18,730	14.48	−12.14
Turnout		1,29,353	77.95	−7.69
Registered electors		1,65,934		
AGP gain from BJP		Swing		

=== 2016 ===
2016 Assam Legislative Assembly election: Chabua
Party	Candidate	Votes	%	±%
BJP	Binod Hazarika	69,531	59.82	
INC	Raju Sahu	38,597	33.20	
CPI(ML)L	Debnath Majhi	2,516	2.16	
Independent	Rabin Chandra Kachari	1,315	1.13	
Independent	Utpal Kakoti	1,252	1.07	
NOTA	None of the above	3,012	2.59	
Majority		30,934	26.62	
Turnout		1,16,223	85.64	
Registered electors		1,35,705		
BJP gain from INC		Swing		
