= Jagiroad Assembly constituency =

Constituency of the Assam legislative assembly in India

Jagiroad
- Constituency No. 52 for the Assam Legislative Assembly

Constituency details
- Country: India
- Region: Northeast India
- State: Assam
- District: Morigaon
- Lok Sabha constituency: Nagaon
- Established: 1978
- Reservation: SC

Member of Legislative Assembly
- 16th Assam Legislative Assembly
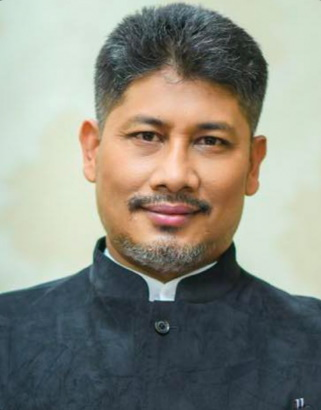
- Incumbent Pijush Hazarika
- Party: Bharatiya Janata Party
- Elected year: 2026

Jagiroad Assembly constituency is one of the 126 assembly constituencies of Assam Legislative Assembly. Jagiroad forms part of the Nagaon Lok Sabha constituency and is reserved for the Scheduled Caste candidates.

== Members of Legislative Assembly ==
Election	Name	Party
1978	Prasad Chandra Dalai	Indian National Congress
1983	Prasad Chandra Dalai	Indian National Congress
1985	Motiram Das	Asom Gana Parishad
1991	Bubul Das	Asom Gana Parishad
1996	Bubul Das	Asom Gana Parishad
2001	Bubul Das	Asom Gana Parishad
2006	Bibekananda Dalai	Indian National Congress
2011	Bibekananda Dalai	Indian National Congress
2016	Pijush Hazarika	Bharatiya Janata Party
2021	Pijush Hazarika	Bharatiya Janata Party
2026	Pijush Hazarika	Bharatiya Janata Party

== Election results ==
=== 2026 ===
2026 Assam Legislative Assembly election: Jagiroad
Party	Candidate	Votes	%	±%
BJP	Pijush Hazarika	155,129	70.64	▲
INC	Bubul Das	61,545	28.03	▼
NOTA	None of the above	2926	1.33	▲
Margin of victory		93,584		
Turnout		219,600		
Registered electors				
BJP hold		Swing		

=== 2021 ===
2021 Assam Legislative Assembly election: Jagiroad
Party	Candidate	Votes	%	±%
BJP	Pijush Hazarika	106,643	53.54	(−)1.44
INC	Swapan Kumar Mandal	77,239	38.78	(+)0.21
AJP	Bubul Das	12,815	6.43	
Bharatiya Gana Parishad	Sukanta Mazumdar	903	0.45	
NOTA	None of the above	1,595	0.8	(+)0.14
Margin of victory		29,404		
Turnout		1,99,195	83.38	(−)1.3
BJP hold		Swing		

=== 2016 ===
2016 Assam Legislative Assembly election: Jagiroad
Party	Candidate	Votes	%	±%
BJP	Pijush Hazarika	94,550	55	
INC	Bibekananda Dalai	66,224	39	
AIUDF	Putul Das	7,192	4	
AITC	Dilip Das	1,357	1	
NOTA	None of the above	1,142		
Margin of victory		28,326		
Turnout				
BJP gain from INC		Swing		

=== 2011 ===
2011 Assam Legislative Assembly election: Jagiroad
Party	Candidate	Votes	%	±%
INC	Bibekananda Dalai	67,659		
AGP	Bubul Das	33,211		
BJP	Sailesh Das	26,376		
AIUDF	Bhaba Kanta Bharali	11,636		
AITC	Jugal Kishore Saikia	2,076		
Margin of victory				
Turnout				
INC hold		Swing		

=== 2006 ===
2006 Assam Legislative Assembly election: Jagiroad
Party	Candidate	Votes	%	±%
INC	Bibekananda Dalai	37,786		
AGP	Premananda Das	25,612		
Asom Gana Parishad Pragtisheel	Bubul Das	20,101		
Independent	Lakshmi Das	18,344		
Independent	Swapan Kumar Mandal	12,565		
LJP	Atul Hazarika	1,195		
Margin of victory				
Turnout				
INC gain from AGP		Swing		

=== 2001 ===
2001 Assam Legislative Assembly election: Jagiroad
Party	Candidate	Votes	%	±%
AGP	Bubul Das	53,652		
INC	Bibekananda Dalai	47,380		
JD(S)	Dipak Kumar Das	754		
Margin of victory				
Turnout				
AGP hold		Swing		

== See also ==
- Morigaon district
- List of constituencies of Assam Legislative Assembly
