= Ananta Kumar Malo =

Indian politician

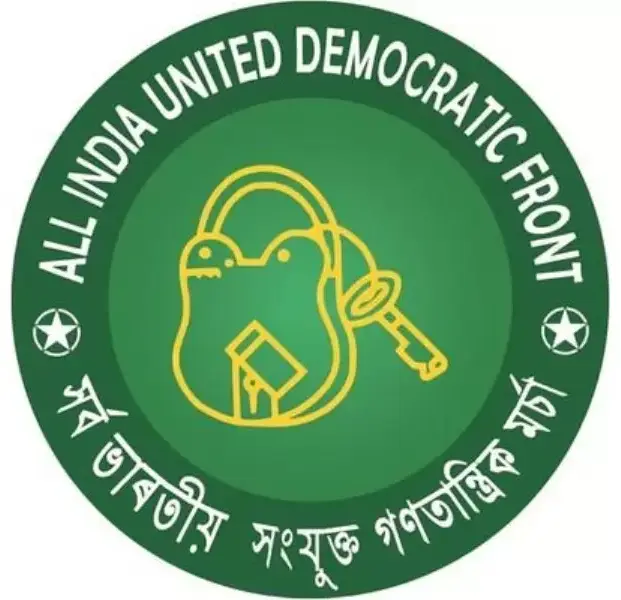

Member of Assam Legislative Assembly
- In office 2016–2021
- Preceded by: Chandan Kumar Sarkar
- Succeeded by: Pradip Sarkar
- Constituency: Abhayapuri South

Personal details
- Born: 1962 (age 63–64)
- Citizenship: India
- Party: All India United Democratic Front
- Parent: Makhan Chandra Malo (Father)
- Education: Dhupguri High School, Jalpaiguri, West Bengal, India(10th Pass)
- Occupation: Politician
- Profession: Businessman

Ananta Kumar Malo (born 1962) is an Indian businessman and politician from Assam, who is affiliated with the All India United Democratic Front. He was elected in the Assam Legislative Assembly representing Abhayapuri South constituency from 2016 to 2021.
