= Ashwini Roy Sarkar =

Indian politician

Ashwini Ray Sarkar
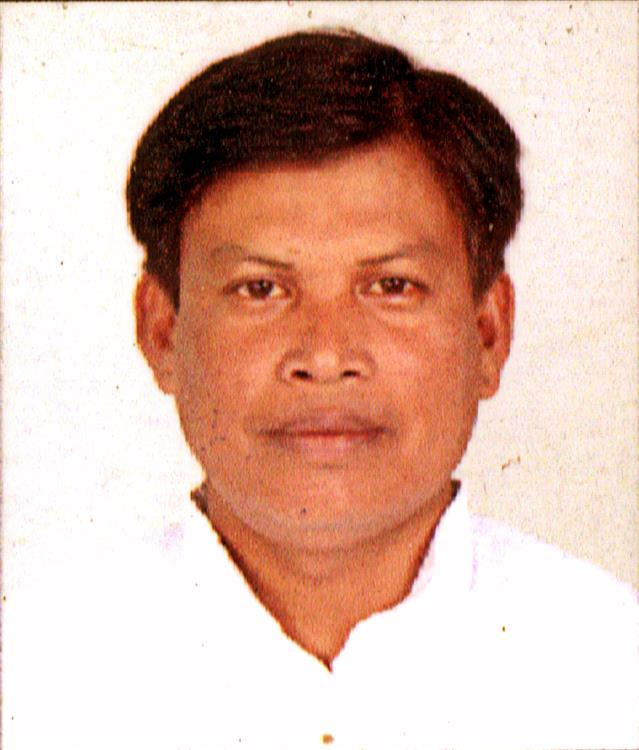
- Official portrait

Cabinet Minister, Assam
- Incumbent
- Assumed office 5 June 2026
- Chief Minister: Himanta Biswa Sarma
- Departments: Social Justice and Empowerment; Soil Conservation; Welfare of Minorities and Development
- Preceded by: Himanta Biswa Sarma

Member, Assam Legislative Assembly
- Incumbent
- Assumed office 4 May 2026
- Preceded by: Abdus Sobahan Ali Sarkar
- In office 19 May 2016 – 2 May 2021
- Preceded by: Abu Taher Bepari
- Succeeded by: Abdus Sobahan Ali Sarkar
- Constituency: Golakganj

Personal details
- Born: 30 June 1972 (age 54)

Ashwini Ray Sarkar is a Bharatiya Janata Party politician from Assam. He currently serves as a cabinet minister in the Government of Assam. He was elected to the Assam Legislative Assembly in the 2016 elections and 2026 elections from Golakganj constituency.
