= Kaliabor Lok Sabha constituency =

Former Lok Sabha constituency in Assam

Coordinates: 26.53°N 93.09°E

Kaliabor
- Former Lok Sabha constituency

Constituency details
- Country: India
- Region: Northeast India
- State: Assam
- Established: 1967
- Abolished: 2023

Kaliabor was one of the 14 Lok Sabha constituencies in Assam state in north-eastern India. After the delimitation, the constituency's the name was changed to Kaziranga and the area was also changed.

== Assembly segments ==
Kaliabor Lok Sabha constituency was composed of the following assembly segments:

Constituency number	Name	Reserved for (SC/None)	District
83	Dhing	None	Nagaon
84	Batadroba	None	Nagaon
85	Rupohihat	None	Nagaon
88	Samaguri	None	Nagaon
89	Kaliabor	None	Nagaon
93	Bokakhat	None	Golaghat
94	Sarupathar	None	Golaghat
95	Golaghat	None	Golaghat
96	Khumtai	None	Golaghat
97	Dergaon	SC	Golaghat

== Members of Parliament ==
Year	Winner	Party
1967	Bedabrata Barua	Indian National Congress
1971	Bedabrata Barua	Indian National Congress
1977	Bedabrata Barua	Indian National Congress
1980	Bishnu Prasad	Indian National Congress
1984	Bhadreswar Tanti	Asom Gana Parishad
1991	Tarun Gogoi	Indian National Congress
1996	Keshab Mahanta	Asom Gana Parishad
1998	Tarun Gogoi	Indian National Congress
1999	Tarun Gogoi	Indian National Congress
2002^	Dip Gogoi	Indian National Congress
2004	Dip Gogoi	Indian National Congress
2009	Dip Gogoi	Indian National Congress
2014	Gourav Gogoi	Indian National Congress
2019	Gourav Gogoi	Indian National Congress

^ by poll

== Election results ==
=== General elections 2019 ===
2019 Indian general elections: Kaliabor
Party	Candidate	Votes	%	±%
INC	Gourav Gogoi	786,092	55.18	+17.21
AGP	Moni Madhab Mahanta	5,76,098	40.44	+33.75
Independent	Jiten Gogoi	18,344	1.29	+0.58
NOTA	None of the above	15,913	1.12	+0.06
Majority		2,09,994	14.74	+6.69
Turnout		14,24,795	82.12	+2.01
INC hold		Swing		

=== General elections 2014 ===
2014 Indian general elections: Kaliabor
Party	Candidate	Votes	%	±%
INC	Gourav Gogoi	4,43,315	37.97	−7.28
BJP	Mrinal Kumar Saikia	3,49,441	29.93	+29.93
AIUDF	Bijoy Kumar Tiru	2,31,295	19.81	−0.91
AGP	Dr. Arun Kumar Sarma	78,132	6.69	−22.74
Independent	Binod Gogoi	9,583	0.82	−0.16
Independent	Montu Saikia	9,133	0.78	+0.78
Independent	Jiten Gogoi	8,271	0.71	+0.71
AITC	Samsul Alam	6,538	0.56	+0.56
CPI(ML)L	Arup Kumar Mahanta	5,433	0.47	+0.47
Independent	Rahmat Ullah	4,985	0.43	+0.43
AIFB	Mithual Kumar	2,966	0.25	+0.25
AAP	Jinti Gogoi	2,584	0.22	+0.22
Independent	Sahaba Ahmed	2,411	0.21	+0.21
NOTA	None of the above	12,403	1.06	
Majority		93,874	8.05	−7.77
Turnout		11,67,391	80.11	
INC hold		Swing		

=== General elections 2009 ===
2009 Indian general elections: Kaliabor
Party	Candidate	Votes	%	±%
INC	Dip Gogoi	4,34,676	45.24	
AGP	Gunin Hazarika	2,82,687	29.42	
AUDF	Siraj Uddin Ajmal	1,98,983	20.71	
Majority		1,51,989	15.89	
Turnout		9,60,563	71.24	
INC hold		Swing		

== See also ==
- Kaziranga Lok Sabha constituency
- List of constituencies of the Lok Sabha
- Nagaon district
