= Dinesh Chandra Sarkar =

Indian politician

Dinesh Chandra Sarkar is a Bharatiya Janata Party politician from Assam. He was elected to the Assam Legislative Assembly in the 2001 elections from Golakganjt constituency.
