= Titabor =

Titabor Titabor
- Town
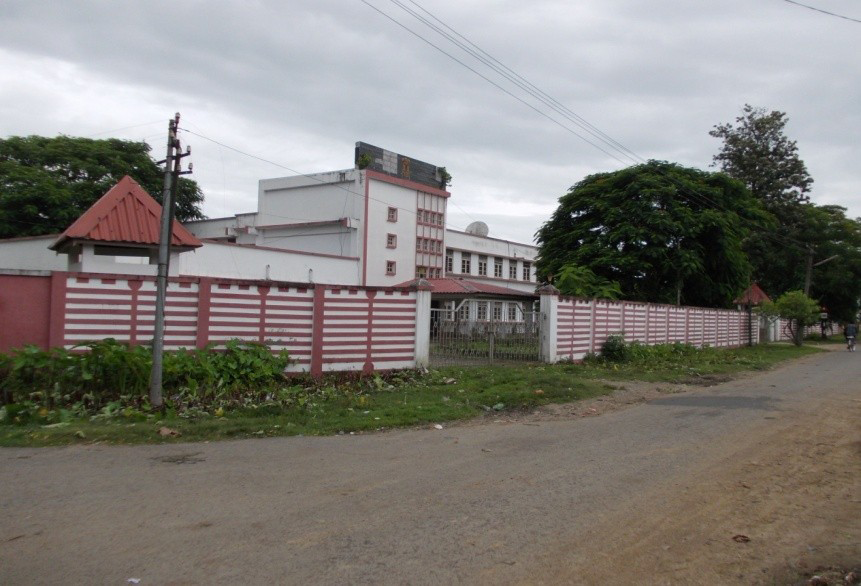

- Location in Assam, India Titabor (India)
- Coordinates: 26.60°N 94.20°E
- Country: India
- State: Assam
- District: Jorhat
- Elevation: 172 m (564 ft)

Population (2021)
  - Total: 135,256

Languages
  - Official: Assamese
- Time zone: UTC+5:30 (IST)
- PIN: 785630
- Telephone code: 0376
- Vehicle registration: AS 03

Titabor (/ˌtiːtəˈbɔːr/) is a town in the Jorhat district of Assam in India. It is about 20 km away from Jorhat City. It is one of the highly greeny places of Assam, surrounded by different tea-estates. The town serves as the administrative headquarters of the Thengal Kachari Autonomous Council.

== Geography ==
Titabar is located at 26.60°N 94.20°E. and has an average elevation of 172 m (564 ft).

== Demographics ==
In the 2001 Indian census, the Titabor subdivision had a population of 110,224. Males constitute 55% of the population and females 45%. Titabor has an average literacy rate of 81%, higher than the national average of 59.5%: male literacy is 84%, and female literacy is 77%; 11% of the population is under 6 years of age.

== Transport ==
Titabor is well connected by road and railways. Na Ali and Gar Ali connect the town with Jorhat. Buses and mini vans are daily ply from Jorhat to Titabor. For long distance, ASTC and other private bus transportation service operate direct bus from Titabor to Guwahati via Jorhat. It has a railway station on Lumding-Dibrugarh section under the Tinsukia railway division of Northeast Frontier Railway. The nearest airport is Jorhat Airport.

== Place of interests ==
Thengal Bhawan

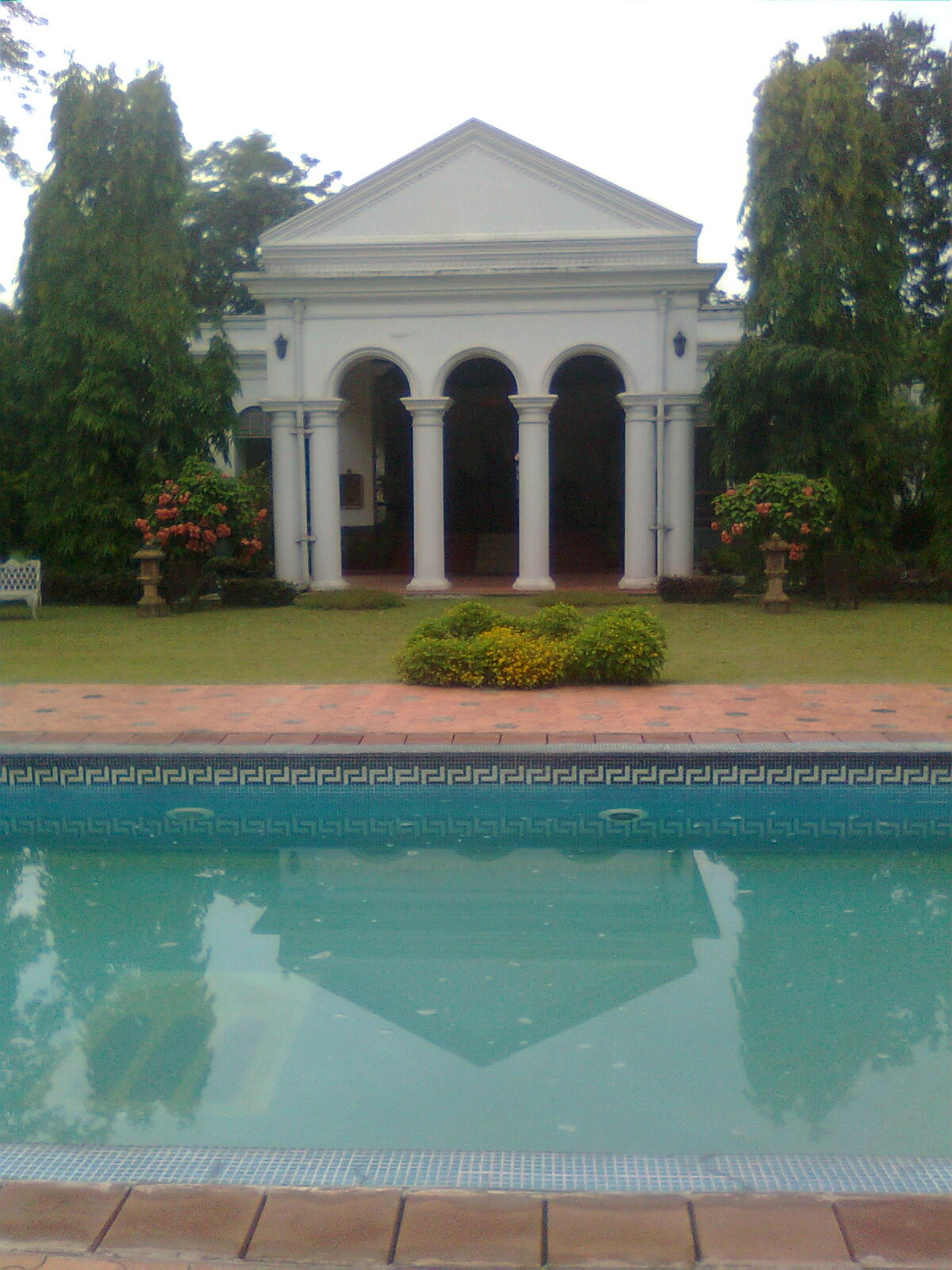
Thengal Bhawan

The Thengal Bhawan is Located at Jalukonibari in Titabor, was built in 1880 by Raibahadur Siva Prasad Barooah. In 1929, he published a weekly Assamese newspaper. Later, he established his printing press and office at Thengal Bhawan and managed to publish a daily newspaper, Dainik Batori. It was the first Assamese daily newspaper. The Thengal Bhawan is now used as a guest house.

Thengal Cultural Centre and Museum

The Thengal Cultural Centre and Museum is located at Balijan Gaon. The museum is preserving the age old traditions, culture and heritage of the Thengal-Kachari community. It also has the amusement facilities for children.

Tea Gardens

There are many tea gardens in Titabar area in radius of apprx 20-25 km. In the west there are some of the oldest tea gardens like Narayanpur Panbari Tea Estate, Saraipani Tea Estate, Bukaholla Tea Estate, Duflating Tea Estate, Kachajan Tea Estate, Letekujan Tea Estate etc.

== Politics ==
The Titabor subdivision is part of the Jorhat (Lok Sabha constituency). The current MP from Jorhat is Gaurav Gogoi of INC.

The previous MLA from Titabar (Vidhan Sabha constituency) was Tarun Gogoi, the former Chief Minister of Assam - he has been in this seat since 2001 till he died on 23 November 2020. Bhaskar Jyoti Baruah of INC is the incumbent MLA of this constituency. He is a Graduate from the St.Edmunds College, Shillong.

== Education ==
Pragjyotika Academy, situated in the heart of Titabor, is a secondary school. Concept Junior College is another private educational institute of the town. Titabar has also some famous educational institutions like Nanda Nath Saikia College, Mihiram Saikia Higher Secondary School, Titabar Town High School, Jawahar Navodaya Vidyalaya, Jorhat and AEWT Group of Institutions (Assam Pharmacy Institute and Assam Nursing Institute) . It also has the Regional Agricultural Research Station, Sericulture Training Institute and District Institute of Education and Training, Jorhat.

== Notable people ==
- Late Ashok Saikia, 1971 batch IAS officer of Assam-Meghalaya Cadre, Joint Secretary (PMO) in the Atal Bihari Vajpayee Government
- Siva Prasad Barooah, tea planter, philanthropist, politician
- Bijoy Krishna Handique, former MP
- Hemendra Prasad Barooah, entrepreneur, tea planter and philanthropist
- Satyendra Nath Borkataki, ICS and former diplomat, historian
- Shrinjan Rajkumar Gohain, Indian Chess Player
- Tarun Gogoi, former Chief Minister of Assam
- Jageswar Sarmah, litterateur and scholar
- Hirendra Nath Dutta, Sahitya Akademi Award winner poet
