= Golakganj Assembly constituency =

Constituency of the Assam legislative assembly in India

Coordinates: 26.11°N 89.83°E

Golakganj
- Constituency No. 6 for the Assam Legislative Assembly

Constituency details
- Country: India
- Region: Northeast India
- State: Assam
- District: Dhubri
- Lok Sabha constituency: Dhubri
- Established: 1951
- Reservation: None

Member of Legislative Assembly
- 16th Assam Legislative Assembly
- Incumbent Ashwini Roy Sarkar
- Party: Bharatiya Janata Party
- Alliance: National Democratic Alliance
- Elected year: 2026

Golakganj Assembly constituency is one of the 126 constituencies of the Assam Legislative Assembly in India. Golakganj is part of the Dhubri Lok Sabha constituency.

== Members of Legislative Assembly ==
Year	Winner	Party
1952	Santosh Barua	Indian National Congress
1957	Bhuban Chandra Prodhani	Indian National Congress
1962	Sarat Chandra Sinha	Indian National Congress
1967	K. C. Roy Pradhani	Independent politician
1972	K. C. Roy Pradhani	Independent politician
1978	Alauddin Sarkar	Communist Party of India
1983	K. C. Roy Pradhani	Indian National Congress
1985	Dalim Ray	Independent politician
1991	Alauddin Sarkar	Communist Party of India
1996	Alauddin Sarkar	Communist Party of India
2001	Dinesh Chandra Sarkar	Bharatiya Janata Party
2006	Abu Taher Bepari	Indian National Congress
2011	Abu Taher Bepari	Indian National Congress
2016	Ashwini Roy Sarkar	Bharatiya Janata Party
2021	Abdus Sobahan Ali Sarkar	Indian National Congress
2026	Ashwini Roy Sarkar	Bharatiya Janata Party

== Election results ==
=== 2026 ===
2026 Assam Legislative Assembly election: Golakganj
Party	Candidate	Votes	%	±%
BJP	Ashwini Roy Sarkar	110,533	56.88	+13.74
INC	Kartik Chandra Ray	79,751	41.04	−7.92
AIUDF	Jamsher Talukdar	2,485	1.28	+1.28
RUC	Jakir Hussain	423	0.22	+0.03
NOTA	None of the above	1,120	0.58	−0.06
Majority		30,782	15.84	+10.02
Turnout		194,312	94.14	+4.14
BJP gain from INC		Swing	7.92	

=== 2021 ===
2021 Assam Legislative Assembly election: Golakganj
Party	Candidate	Votes	%	±%
INC	Abdus Sobahan Ali Sarkar	89,870	48.96	+6.72
BJP	Ashwini Roy Sarkar	79,171	43.14	−3.06
Independent	Abu Taher Bepari	10,431	5.68	New
NOTA	None of the above	1,172	0.64	+0.03
AITC	Sahidur Rahman	1,114	0.61	New
Independent	Nilimoy Prodhani	1,030	0.56	New
AJP	Atikur Rahman	410	0.22	New
RUC	Mominur Alom	343	0.19	New
Majority		10,699	5.82	+1.86
Turnout		1,83,541	90	−1.23
Registered electors		2,03,940		+15.17
INC gain from BJP		Swing	2.76	

=== 2016 ===
2016 Assam Legislative Assembly election: Golakganj
Party	Candidate	Votes	%	±%
BJP	Ashwini Roy Sarkar	74,644	46.20	+5.22
INC	Abdus Sobhan Ali Sarkar	68,253	42.24	−1.71
AIUDF	Safer Ali Ahmed	16,843	10.42	−1.08
Independent	Jalaluddin Khan	814	0.50	N/A
NOTA	None of the above	1,001	0.61	N/A
Majority		6,391	3.96	+0.99
Turnout		1,61,555	91.23	+3.84
Registered electors		1,77,078		+14.66
BJP gain from INC		Swing	2.25	

=== 2011 ===
2011 Assam Legislative Assembly election: Golakganj
Party	Candidate	Votes	%	±%
INC	Abu Taher Bepari	59,320	43.95	
BJP	Ashwini Roy Sarkar	55,312	40.98	
AIUDF	Safer Ali Ahmed	15,522	11.50	
AGP	Santosh Kumar Sarkar	1,879	1.39	
AITC	Jalaluddin Khan	1,575	1.16	
Independent	Ali Hussain	1,360	1.00	
Majority		4,008	2.97	
Turnout		1,34,968	87.39	
Registered electors		1,54,433		
INC hold		Swing		
