= Moinuddin Ahmed =

Indian politician

Member of Assam Legislative Assembly

Assembly Member for Jaleshwar
- Incumbent
- Assumed office 2011

Moinuddin Ahmed is an All India United Democratic Front politician from Assam.

== Early life ==
Ahmed was born in 1971 to a Muslim family in Dhubri, Goalpara. He was the son of Kefayat Ali. Ahmed holds Bachelor of Laws, Master of Arts and Bachelor of Education degrees.

== Career ==
He was elected to the Assam Legislative Assembly in the 2011 election from Jaleswar constituency.
