= Ponakan Baruah =

Indian politician

Member of Assam Legislative Assembly
- In office 21 May 2021 – 2026
- Preceded by: Binod Hazarika
- Constituency: Chabua (Vidhan Sabha constituency)

Personal details
- Born: 20 January Chabua
- Party: Asom Gana Parishad
- Spouse: Mousumi Phukan
- Education: DDR College, Chabua
- Profession: Politician

Ponakan Baruah is an Indian politician and member of Asom Gana Parishad from Assam. He is an MLA elected to the Assam Legislative Assembly from the Chabua constituency in the 2021 election.
