= Mangaldai Assembly constituency =

Assembly constituency of Assam

Mangaldai
- Constituency No. 50 for the Assam Legislative Assembly

Constituency details
- Country: India
- Region: Northeast India
- State: Assam
- District: Darrang
- Lok Sabha constituency: Darrang–Udalguri
- Established: 1951
- Reservation: None

Member of Legislative Assembly
- 16th Assam Legislative Assembly
- Incumbent Nilima Devi
- Party: Bharatiya Janata Party
- Alliance: National Democratic Alliance
- Elected year: 2026
- Preceded by: Basanta Das

Mangaldai Assembly constituency (formerly known as Mangaldoi) is one of 126 assembly constituencies of the Assam Legislative Assembly. Mangaldai is part of the Darrang–Udalguri Lok Sabha constituency.

== Members of Legislative Assembly ==
Election	Member	Party affiliation
1952	Purandar Sarma	Indian National Congress
1957	Dandi Ram Dutta	Indian National Congress
1962	Dandi Ram Dutta	Indian National Congress
1967	Md. Matlibuddin	Independent
1972	Syeda Anwara Taimur	Indian National Congress
1978	Anil Das	Janata Party
1983	Kartik Sarkar	Indian National Congress
1985	Nilamoni Das	Independent
1991	Nakul Chandra Das	Indian National Congress
1996	Hiren Kumar Das	Asom Gana Parishad
2001	Basanta Das	Indian National Congress
2006	Hiren Kumar Das	Asom Gana Parishad
2011	Basanta Das	Indian National Congress
2016	Gurujyoti Das	Bharatiya Janata Party
2021	Basanta Das	Indian National Congress
2026	Nilima Devi	Bharatiya Janata Party

== Election results ==
=== 2026 ===
2026 Assam Legislative Assembly election: Mangaldai
Party	Candidate	Votes	%	±%
BJP	Nilima Devi	100,078	54.77	+11.72
INC	Rijumoni Talukdar	76,142	41.67	−13.43
AITC	Harekrishna Deka	1,961	0.5	
AIUDF	Azizur Rahman	907	1.07	
SUCI(C)	Ajit Acharjya	796	0.44	
NOTA	NOTA	1,853	1.01	
Margin of victory		23,936	13.10	
Turnout		182,716		
Rejected ballots				
Registered electors				
BJP gain from INC		Swing	-0.33	

=== 2021 ===
2021 Assam Legislative Assembly election: Mangaldai
Party	Candidate	Votes	%	±%
INC	Basanta Das	111,386	55.10	+26.20
BJP	Gurujyoti Das	87,032	43.05	+1.74
AJP	Gakul Baruah	2,746	1.36	
NOTA	NOTA	1,567	0.77	
Margin of victory		24,354	12.05	−0.46
Turnout		202,144	90.50	+1.66
Rejected ballots				
Registered electors		223,368		+11.65
INC gain from BJP		Swing	+13.79	

=== 2016 ===
2016 Assam Legislative Assembly election: Mangaldoi
Party	Candidate	Votes	%	±%
BJP	Gurujyoti Das	73,423	41.31	+31.98
INC	Basanta Das	51,378	28.90	−16.46
AIUDF	Hiren Kumar Das	48,417	27.24	−1.67
Independent	Jitendra Sarkar	953	0.53	N/A
LJP	Bhupen Chandra Das	874	0.49	N/A
Independent	Arjun Chandra Das	841	0.47	N/A
Independent	Jagadish Chandra Sarkar	466	0.26	N/A
NOTA	None of the above	1,384	0.77	N/A
Majority		22,045	12.41	−4.04
Turnout		1,77,736	88.84	+10.56
Registered electors		200,056		+7.10
BJP gain from INC		Swing	-4.01	

=== 2011 ===
2011 Assam Legislative Assembly election: Mangaldoi
Party	Candidate	Votes	%	±%
INC	Basanta Das	65,440	45.36	
AIUDF	Mahendra Das	41,717	28.91	
AGP	Hiren Kumar Das	21,215	14.70	
BJP	Nripendra Mohan Das	13,460	9.33	
Independent	Surama Das	2,447	1.70	
Majority		23,723	16.45	
Turnout		1,44,279	78.28	
Registered electors		186,789		
INC gain from AGP		Swing		
