= Gurujyoti Das =

Indian politician

Member of Assam Legislative Assembly
- In office 2016–2021
- Preceded by: Basanta Das
- Succeeded by: Basanta Das
- Constituency: Mangaldai

Personal details
- Born: Mangaldai, India
- Party: Bharatiya Janata Party
- Spouse: Leena Das
- Occupation: MLA of Assam Legislative Assembly (nominated) in 2016, Politician, Businessman
- Nickname: Gitu

Gurujyoti Das is an Indian politician who has served as an MLA from the Mangaldai constituency in Assam. He has been elected in Assam Legislative Assembly election in 2016 from Mangaldoi constituency.
