= Mrinal Saikia =

Indian politician

Member of Assam Legislative Assembly
- Incumbent
- Assumed office 19 May 2016
- Preceded by: Bismita Gogoi
- Constituency: Khumtai

Personal details
- Born: 28 July 1966 (age 59) Golgahat
- Party: Bharatiya Janata Party
- Parent: Khageswari Saikia (Mother)

Mrinal Saikia (born July 28, 1966, in Golaghat, Assam) is a Bharatiya Janata Party politician from Assam. He has been elected in Assam Legislative Assembly election in 2016 from Khumtai constituency. Saikia was a former activist of the United Liberation Front of Asom.
