= Bedabrata Barua =

Indian politician (b. 1928)

Minister of State of Law and Justice Government of India
- In office 1969–1970
- Prime Minister: Indira Gandhi

Member of Parliament, Lok Sabha
- In office 1967-1980
- Succeeded by: Bishnu Prasad
- Constituency: Kaliabor Constituency, Assam

Personal details
- Born: 14 July 1928
- Died: 14 April 2026 (aged 97)
- Party: Indian National Congress

Bedabrata Barua (14 July 1928 – 14 April 2026) was an Indian politician. He was elected to the Lok Sabha, the lower house of the Parliament of India, from the Kaliabor Constituency of Assam in 1967, 1971 and 1977 as a member of the Indian National Congress. He was a Union Deputy Minister of Law, Justice & Company Affairs.
