= Abdul Jabbar (Dalgaon politician) =

Indian politician (1931–2025)

Abdul Jabbar (1931 – 5 October 2025) was an Indian Asom Gana Parishad politician from Assam. He was elected to the Assam Legislative Assembly from Dalgaon constituency in the 1985, 1991 and 2001 elections. Jabbar died on 5 October 2025, at the age of 94.
