= Khumtai Assembly constituency =

Constituency of the Assam legislative assembly in India

Khumtai
- Constituency No. 106 for the Assam Legislative Assembly

Constituency details
- Country: India
- Region: Northeast India
- State: Assam
- District: Golaghat
- Lok Sabha constituency: Kaziranga
- Established: 1978
- Reservation: None

Member of Legislative Assembly
- 16th Assam Legislative Assembly
- Incumbent Mrinal Saikia
- Party: Bharatiya Janata Party
- Elected year: 2026

Khumtai Assembly constituency is one of the 126 assembly constituencies of Assam Legislative Assembly. Khumtai forms part of the Kaziranga Lok Sabha constituency.

== Members of Legislative Assembly ==
Election	Member	Party affiliation
1978	Nogen Barua	Janata Party
1983	Jiba Kanta Gogoi	Indian National Congress
1985	Probin Kumar Gogoi	Independent
1991	Jiba Kanta Gogoi	Indian National Congress
1996	Probin Kumar Gogoi	Independent
2001	Jiba Kanta Gogoi	Indian National Congress
2002^	Probin Kumar Gogoi	Asom Gana Parishad
2006	Probin Kumar Gogoi	Asom Gana Parishad
2011	Bismita Gogoi	Indian National Congress
2016	Mrinal Saikia	Bharatiya Janata Party
2021	Mrinal Saikia	Bharatiya Janata Party
2026	Mrinal Saikia	Bharatiya Janata Party

^ Indicates Bye-Elections

== Election results ==
=== 2026 ===
2026 Assam Legislative Assembly election: Khumtai
Party	Candidate	Votes	%	±%
BJP	Mrinal Saikia	91,127	62.43	
INC	Roselina Tirkey	32,715	22.41	
JMM	Amit Nag	17,090	11.71	
NOTA	NOTA	2,146	1.42	
Margin of victory		58412		
Turnout		145,976		
Rejected ballots				
Registered electors				
BJP hold		Swing		

=== 2021 ===
2021 Assam Legislative Assembly election: Khumtai
Party	Candidate	Votes	%	±%
BJP	Mrinal Saikia	65,655	56.49	+1.25
INC	Bismita Gogoi	38,522	33.14	−5.93
NOTA	None of the above	1,399	1.2	−0.03
Majority		27,133	23.35	+7.18
Turnout		1,16,233	82.28	
Registered electors		1,41,259		
BJP hold		Swing		

=== 2016 ===
2016 Assam Legislative Assembly election: Khumtai
Party	Candidate	Votes	%	±%
BJP	Mrinal Saikia	57,637	55.24	
INC	Bismita Gogoi	40,763	39.07	
NOTA	None of the above	1,286	1.23	
Majority		16,874	16.17	
Turnout		1,04,322	86.73	
Registered electors		1,20,283		
BJP gain from INC		Swing		
