= Dip Gogoi =

Indian politician

Member of Parliament, Lok Sabha
- In office 4 March 2002 – 16 May 2014
- Preceded by: Tarun Gogoi
- Succeeded by: Gaurav Gogoi
- Constituency: Kaliabor

Member of the Assam Legislative Assembly
- In office 13 May 2001 – 18 May 2001
- Preceded by: Hemanta Kalita
- Succeeded by: Tarun Gogoi
- Constituency: Titabor

Personal details
- Born: 17 December 1951 (age 74) Jorhat, Assam, India
- Party: Indian National Congress
- Spouse: Mitali Gogoi
- Relatives: Tarun Gogoi (brother)
- Education: University of Dibrugarh
- As of 30 August, 2012

Dip Gogoi (Assamese: দীপ গগৈ; born 17 December 1951) is an Indian politician from Assam who was a Member of Parliament, Lok Sabha from Kaliabor Lok Sabha constituency from 2002 to 2014. He was also the member of the Assam Legislative Assembly from Kaliabor constituency in 2001 and is a member of the Indian National Congress. He is the brother of former Chief Minister of Assam, Tarun Gogoi.

== Background ==
Dip Gogoi was educated at Dibrugarh University and graduated with a B.Sc. degree. He is married to Mitali Gogoi.

== Political career ==
Gogoi has served one term as a Member of the Legislative Assembly (MLA). He was elected to the Assam state assembly from the Titabar constituency in 2001 but vacated the seat a few months later for his brother Tarun Gogoi. Gogoi has since served three terms as a Member of Parliament (MP) from the Lok Sabha. He was elected from Kaliabor in the 2002 by-elections (seat vacated by his brother) and was re-elected in 2004 and 2009. Gogoi is a member of the Indian National Congress.
