= Bubul Das =

Indian politician

Member of Assam Legislative Assembly
- In office 1991–2006
- Preceded by: Motiram Das
- Succeeded by: Bibekananda Dalai
- Constituency: Jagiroad

Personal details
- Party: Indian National Congress
- Other political affiliations: Asom Gana Parishad

Bubul Das is an Indian politician from Assam. He has been elected in Assam Legislative Assembly election three times in 1996 to 2006 from Jagiroad constituency.
