= Pradip Sarkar (Assam politician) =

Indian politician

Member of the Assam Legislative Assembly
- Incumbent
- Assumed office 21 May 2021
- Preceded by: Ananta Kumar Malo
- Constituency: Abhayapuri South

Personal details
- Party: Indian National Congress
- Spouse: Anamika Sarkar
- Parent: Chandan Kumar Sarkar (Father) Swapna Rani Sarkar (Mother)
- Occupation: Politician and Businessman

Pradip Sarkar is an Indian politician serving as the member of the Assam Legislative Assembly from Abhayapuri South since 2021, having defeated AGP's Purnendu Banikya. He is a member of the Indian National Congress. His father, Chandan Sarkar was also MLA and minister in the Government of Assam and his mother, Swapna Rani Sarkar was chairman of Abhayapuri Town Committee.
