= Abdus Sobahan Ali Sarkar =

Assam politician

Member of Assam Legislative Assembly
- In office 21 May 2021 – 4 May 2026
- Preceded by: Ashwini Roy Sarkar
- Succeeded by: Ashwini Roy Sarkar
- Constituency: Golakganj

Personal details
- Born: 1976 (age 49–50) Golakganj, Dhubri district, Assam
- Party: Indian National Congress

Abdus Sobahan Ali Sarkar is an Indian politician from the state of Assam. He was elected to the Assam Legislative Assembly from Golakganj in the 2021 Assam Legislative Assembly election as a member of the Indian National Congress.
