= Hemanta Kalita =

Indian politician

Member of Assam Legislative Assembly
- In office 1996–2001
- Preceded by: Mahendra Bora
- Succeeded by: Dip Gogoi
- Constituency: Titabar

Personal details
- Born: Hemanta Kalita
- Party: Bharatiya Janata Party
- Other political affiliations: Asom Gana Parishad
- Profession: Politician

Hemanta Kalita is a Bharatiya Janata Party politician from Assam, India. He was elected in Assam Legislative Assembly election in 1996 from Titabar constituency. Formerly, he was with Asom Gana Parishad.
