= Jaleswar, Assam Assembly constituency =

Jaleswar
- Constituency No. 12 for the Assam Legislative Assembly

Constituency details
- Country: India
- Region: Northeast India
- State: Assam
- District: Goalpara
- Lok Sabha constituency: Dhubri
- Established: 1978
- Reservation: None

Member of Legislative Assembly
- 16th Assam Legislative Assembly
- Incumbent Aftabuddin
- Party: Indian National Congress
- Alliance: Asom Sonmilito Morcha
- Elected year: 2026

Jaleswar Assembly constituency is one of 126 assembly constituencies of the Assam Legislative Assembly in the northeastern state of Assam, India. Jaleswar is part of the Dhubri Lok Sabha constituency.

== Members of Legislative Assembly ==
- 1978: Afzalur Rahman, Janata Party
- 1983: Afzalur Rahman, Indian Congress (Socialist) - Sarat Chandra Sinha
- 1985: Afzalur Rahman, Independent
- 1991: Afzalur Rahman, Indian National Congress
- 1996: Afzalur Rahman, Indian National Congress
- 2001: Aftabuddin Mollah, Indian National Congress
- 2006: Afzalur Rahman, Loko Sanmilon
- 2011: Moin Uddin Ahmed, All India United Democratic Front
- 2016: Sahab Uddin Ahmed, All India United Democratic Front
- 2021: Aftabuddin Mollah, Indian National Congress
- 2026: Aftabuddin Mollah, Indian National Congress

== Election results ==
=== 2026 ===
2026 Assam Legislative Assembly election: Jaleswar
| Party | Candidate | Votes | % | ±% |
|---|---|---|---|---|
| INC | Aftabuddin | 162,174 | 69.19 | +18.44 |
| AIUDF | Sheikh Shah Alam | 52,486 | 22.39 | −13.69 |
| AGP | Abu Sha Shadi Hossain | 12,954 | 5.53 | New |
| AITC | Arif Akhtar Ahmed | 1,776 | 0.76 | −0.47 |
| NOTA | NOTA | 1,286 | 0.55 | −0.10 |
| Margin of victory | | 1,09,688 | 46.80 | +32.13 |
| Turnout | | 2,34,379 | 96.28 | +2.84 |
| Rejected ballots | | | | |
| Registered electors | | | | |
| INC hold | | Swing | +2.37 (Note: Two-party swing) | |

=== 2021 ===
2021 Assam Legislative Assembly election: Jaleswar
| Party | Candidate | Votes | % | ±% |
|---|---|---|---|---|
| INC | Aftabuddin | 76,026 | 50.75 | +45.63 |
| AIUDF | Dr. Reza Ma Amin | 54,046 | 36.08 | −7.59 |
| BJP | Osman Goni | 14,053 | 9.38 | +0.39 |
| AITC | Khurshid Mirza Ashikur Rahman | 1,847 | 1.23 | |
| AJP | Roshidul Hoque | 915 | 0.61 | |
| Independent | Akhiruzzaman Mollah | 754 | 0.5 | |
| Independent | Mujaharul Islam | 626 | 0.42 | |
| SUCI(C) | Osman Goni Mollah | 566 | 0.38 | −0.21 |
| NOTA | NOTA | 970 | 0.65 | +0.17 |
| Majority | | 21,980 | 14.67 | +9.48 |
| Turnout | | 1,49,447 | 93.44 | −0.11 |
| Registered electors | | 1,59,937 | | +16.27 |
| INC gain from AIUDF | | Swing | +7.08 (Note: One-party swing) | |

=== 2016 ===
2016 Assam Legislative Assembly election: Jaleswar
| Party | Candidate | Votes | % | ±% |
|---|---|---|---|---|
| AIUDF | Sahab Uddin Ahmed | 56,003 | 43.67 | |
| Independent | Aftab Uddin Mollah | 49,341 | 38.48 | |
| BJP | Abdur Rahim Zibran | 11,535 | 8.99 | |
| INC | Abul Fazal Nasir Uddin Mollah | 6,567 | 5.12 | |
| BRP | Abdul Wahab Sheikh | 1,433 | 1.11 | |
| SUCI(C) | Abdus Salam | 761 | 0.59 | |
| Independent | Innas Ali | 690 | 0.53 | |
| NOTA | None of the above | 627 | 0.48 | |
| Majority | | 6,662 | 5.19 | |
| Turnout | | 1,28,225 | 93.53 | |
| Registered electors | | 1,37,096 | | |
| AIUDF hold | | Swing | | |
