= Aftabuddin =

Indian politician

Aftabuddin Mollah
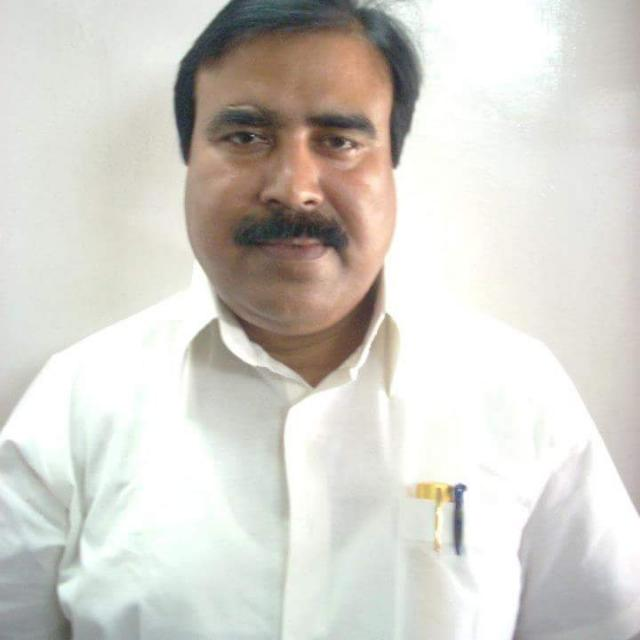

MLA of Jaleswar Vidhan Sabha Constituency
- Incumbent
- Assumed office 21 May 2021
- Preceded by: Sahab Uddin Ahmed
- Constituency: Jaleswar
- In office 2001–2006
- Preceded by: Afzalur Rahman
- Succeeded by: Moin Uddin Ahmed
- Constituency: Jaleswar

Personal details
- Born: Goalpara District, Assam
- Party: Indian National Congress
- Spouse: Nazma Begum
- Children: • Nur Mehdi Hasan Mollah • Nur Mehboob Shakhil Mollah • Nur Masud Habib Mollah • Asifa Junnar Mollah
- Parent: Lt. Alhaz Tahaj Uddin Mollah(father)

Aftab Uddin Mollah, also known as Aftabuddin, is an Indian National Congress politician from Assam. He served as a member of Assam Legislative Assembly for the Jaleswar constituency from 2001 to 2006.
