= Afzalur Rahman =

Indian politician (1942–2021)

MLA of Jaleswar Vidhan Sabha Constituency
- In office 2006–2011
- Preceded by: Aftabuddin Mollah
- Succeeded by: Moin Uddin Ahmed

Panchayat and Rural Development Minister of Assam
- In office 1991–1996

MLA of Jaleswar Vidhan Sabha Constituency
- In office 1978–2001
- Preceded by: Office Established
- Succeeded by: Aftabuddin Mollah

Personal details
- Born: 1942 Goalpara District, Assam
- Died: 11 February 2021 (aged 78–79)
- Party: Loko Sanmilon Party
- Other political affiliations: Janata Party (1978-1983); Indian Congress (Socialist) - Sarat Chandra Sinha(1983-1985); Indian National Congress(1991-2001)

Afzalur Rahman (1942 - 11 February 2021) was an Indian politician and MLA from 39 no. Jaleswar Vidhan Saba in 1978 from the Janata Party, in 1983 as an independent, in both 1991 and 1996 from the Indian National Congress and in 2006 from Loko Sanmilon Party. He was also Panchayat Minister of Assam.
