= Abhayapuri South Assembly constituency =

Constituency of the Assam legislative assembly in India

Coordinates: 26.33°N 90.67°E

Abhayapuri South
- Former constituency No. 35 for the Assam Legislative Assembly

Constituency details
- Country: India
- Region: Northeast India
- State: Assam
- District: Bongaigaon
- Lok Sabha constituency: Barpeta
- Established: 1978
- Abolished: 2023
- Reservation: SC

Abhayapuri South Assembly constituency was one of the 126 constituencies of the Assam Legislative Assembly, in Assam, northeastern India.

Abhayapuri South (constituency number 35) was one of the 3 constituencies located in Bongaigaon district. It was reserved for scheduled castes.

This constituency was abolished in 2023.

Abhayapuri South was part of Barpeta Lok Sabha constituency along with 9 other assembly segments, namely, Bongaigaon and Abhayapuri North in this district, Patacharkuchi, Barpeta, Jania, Baghbar, Sarukhetri and Chenga in Barpeta district and Dharmapur in Nalbari district.

== Town Details ==
Following are the details of Abhayapuri South:

- Country: India.
- State: Assam.
- District: Bongaigaon
- Lok Sabha Constituency: Barpeta.
- Assembly Categorisation: Rural.
- Literacy Level: 69.74%.
- Eligible Electors as per 2021 General Elections: 206,843 Eligible Electors. Male Electors:91,211. Female Electors:83,652.
- Geographic Co-Ordinates: 26°17’36.2"N 90°34’36.1"E.
- Total Area Covered: 435 square kilometres.
- Area Includes: Abhayapuri thana [excluding the villages specified in item (15) of the Appendix] in Goalpara sub-division of Bongaigaon district of Assam.
- Inter State Border : Bongaigaon.
- Number of Polling Stations: Year 2011–206, Year 2016–240, Year 2021–35.

== Members of Legislative Assembly ==
- 1978: Rabindra Nath Choudhury, Janata Party.
- 1985: Ratneswar Sarkar, Independent.
- 1991: Chandan Kumar Sarkar, Indian National Congress.
- 1996: Rabin Banikya, Asom Gana Parishad.
- 2001: Chandan Kumar Sarkar, Indian National Congress.
- 2006: Rabin Banikya, Asom Gana Parishad.
- 2011: Chandan Kumar Sarkar, Indian National Congress.
- 2016: Ananta Kumar Malo, All India United Democratic Front.

Year	Member	Party
2021	Pradip Sarkar	Indian National Congress

== Election results ==
=== 2016 ===
2016 Assam Legislative Assembly election: Abhayapuri South
Party	Candidate	Votes	%	±%
AIUDF	Ananta Kumar Malo	51,525	32.50	+3.29
INC	Chandan Kumar Sarkar	51,334	32.38	−9.86
AGP	Rabin Banikya	50,957	32.14	+10.42
Independent	Nirmalendu Banikya	1,602	1.01	N/A
RPI(A)	Ashok Dutta	1,304	0.82	N/A
Jan Congress Party	Dhiren Majumdar	694	0.43	N/A
NOTA	None of the above	1,113	0.70	N/A
Majority		191	0.12	−12.91
Turnout		1,58,529	90.95	+5.81
Registered electors		1,74,303		
AIUDF gain from INC		Swing		

=== 2011 ===
2011 Assam Legislative Assembly election: Abhayapuri South (SC)
Party	Candidate	Votes	%	±%
INC	Chandan Kumar Sarkar	51,510	42.24	
AIUDF	Bijay Das	35,621	29.21	
AGP	Dhrubajyoti Banikya	26,485	21.72	
BJP	Dinesh Sarkar	2,998	2.46	
AITC	Kaustav Kumar Das	2,628	2.15	
Independent	Ashok Dutta	1,211	0.99	
BPF	Bimal Chandra Das	996	0.82	
Lok Bharati	Mohadev Das	510	0.42	
Majority		15,889	13.03	
Turnout		1,21,959	85.14	
INC gain from AGP		Swing		
