= Sahab Uddin Ahmed =

Indian politician (born 1963)

Member of Assam Legislative Assembly
- In office 2016–2021
- Preceded by: Moin Uddin Ahmed
- Succeeded by: Aftabuddin Mollah
- Constituency: Jaleswar

Personal details
- Born: 12 March 1963 (age 63) Katarihara, Goalpara, Assam, India
- Party: All India United Democratic Front
- Spouse: Roushanara Khatun
- Children: 1 (daughter)
- Parent: Mobarak Ali (father) Delvanu Nessa (mother)

Sahab Uddin Ahmed (born 12 March 1963) is an All India United Democratic Front politician from Assam, India. He was elected to the Assam Legislative Assembly in the 2016 elections from Jaleswar constituency.
