= Hiren Kumar Das =

Indian politician

Hiren Kumar Das is an Asom Gana Parishad politician from Assam. He was elected to the Assam Legislative Assembly in the 1996 and 2006 elections from Mangaldoi constituency.
