= Bhaskar Jyoti Baruah =

Indian politician

Bhaskar Jyoti Baruah is an Indian politician from Assam. He was elected to the Assam Legislative Assembly from Titabar in the 2021 Assam Legislative Assembly election as a member of the Indian National Congress.
