= Banendra Mushahary =

Indian politician

Banendra Mushahary is a Bharatiya Janata Party politician from Assam. He was elected in Assam Legislative Assembly election in 1996 to 2001 and 2011 from Gauripur constituency.

He joined Bharatiya Janata Party on 29 December 2020.

He was previously a member of Asom Gana Parishad.
