= Rabin Banikya =

Indian politician (died 2022)

Rabin Banikya (died 11 November 2022) was an Indian politician from Asom Gana Parishad from Assam.

He was elected in Assam Legislative Assembly election in 1996 and 2006 for the Abhayapuri South constituency.
