= Bhadreswar Tanti =

Indian politician

Bhadreswar Tanti is an Indian politician. He was elected as a Member of Parliament to the lower house of Indian state from Kaliabor Lok Sabha constituency in Assam in 1984. He was a member of the Asom Gana Parishad. Later he joined Bharat Vikas Morcha.
