= Bhaben Baruah =

Indian politician

Bhaben Baruah is an Asom Gana Parishad politician from Assam. He was elected in the Assam Legislative Assembly election in 1985 and 1996 from Chabua constituency.
