= Tarun Gogoi =

13th Chief minister of Assam (1936–2020)

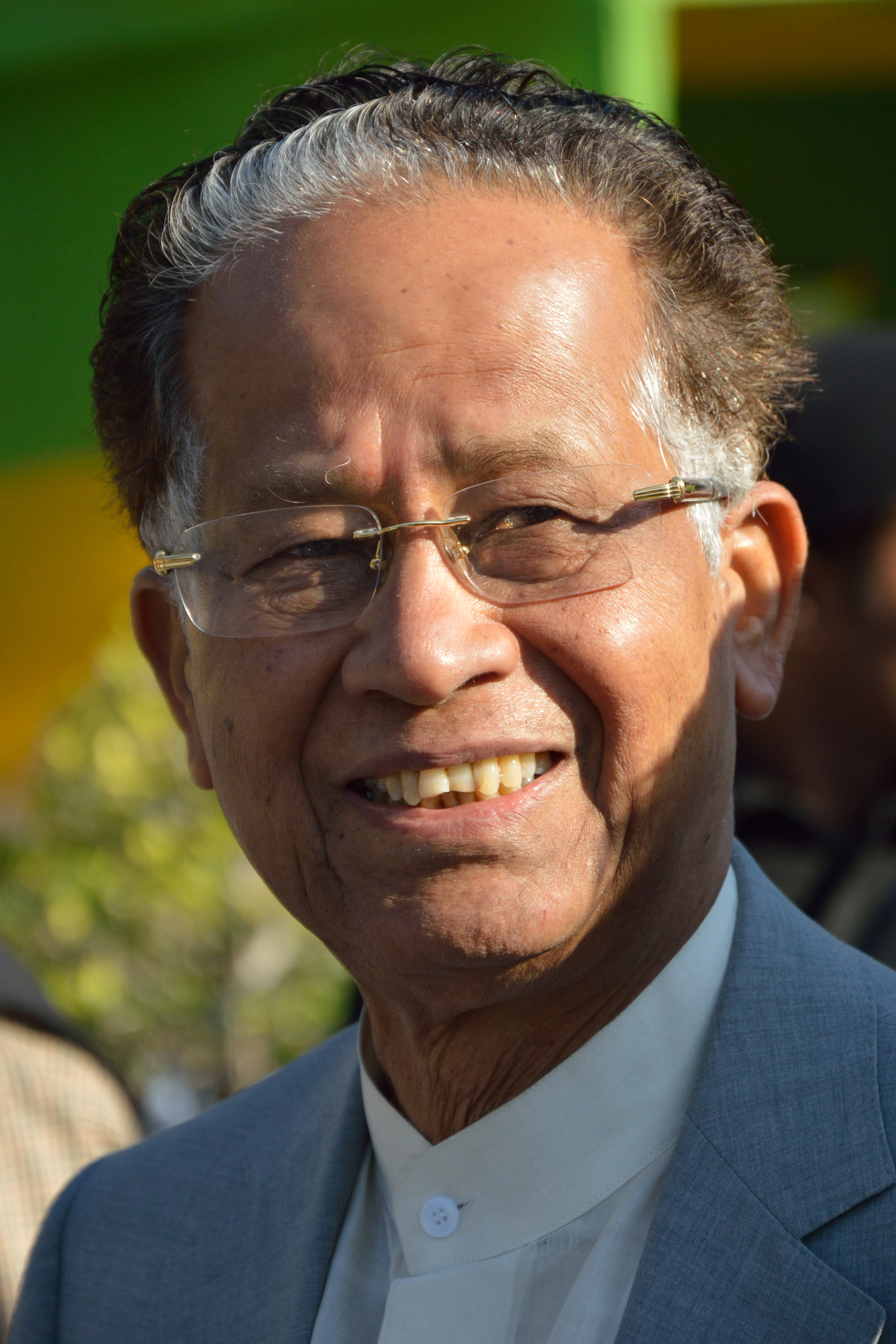
- Gogoi in 2013

13th Chief Minister of Assam
- In office 18 May 2001 – 24 May 2016
- Governor: Srinivas Kumar Sinha; Arvind Dave; Ajai Singh; Shiv Charan Mathur; K. Sankaranarayanan; Syed Sibtey Razi; Janaki Ballabh Patnaik; Padmanabha Acharya
- Preceded by: Prafulla Kumar Mahanta
- Succeeded by: Sarbananda Sonowal

Minister of State (Independent Charge) for Food Processing Industries, Government of India
- In office 17 January 1993 – 13 September 1995
- Prime Minister: P. V. Narasimha Rao
- Preceded by: Giridhar Gamang
- Succeeded by: Kamakhya Prasad Singh Deo

Member of Parliament, Lok Sabha
- In office 10 March 1998 – 13 May 2001
- Preceded by: Keshab Mahanta
- Succeeded by: Dip Gogoi
- Constituency: Kaliabor
- In office 22 June 1991 – 12 May 1996
- Preceded by: Bhadreswar Tanti
- Succeeded by: Keshab Mahanta
- Constituency: Kaliabor
- In office 26 March 1971 – 31 December 1984
- Preceded by: Rajendranath Barua
- Succeeded by: Parag Chaliha
- Constituency: Jorhat

Member of Assam Legislative Assembly
- In office 20 September 2001 – 23 November 2020
- Preceded by: Dip Gogoi
- Succeeded by: Bhaskar Jyoti Baruah
- Constituency: Titabar
- In office 10 May 1996 – 28 February 1998
- Preceded by: Kul Bahadur Chetri
- Succeeded by: Pradyut Bordoloi
- Constituency: Margherita

Personal details
- Born: 1 April 1936 Rangajan Tea Estate, Assam Province, British India (present-day Assam, India)
- Died: 23 November 2020 (aged 84) Guwahati, Assam, India
- Party: Indian National Congress
- Spouse: Dolly Gogoi (m. 1972)
- Children: Chandrima; Gaurav
- Relatives: Dip Gogoi (brother); Ganesh Gogoi (maternal uncle)
- Education: Gauhati University (LLB)
- Occupation: Lawyer; Politician
- Awards: Padma Bhushan (2021; posthumous)
- Website: assamassembly.gov.in/tarun-gogoi.html

Tarun Gogoi (11 October 1936 – 23 November 2020) was an Indian politician and lawyer who served as the 13th Chief Minister of Assam from 2001 to 2016. He was the longest serving Chief Minister of Assam. He was a member of the Indian National Congress. He is the father of Deputy Leader of the Opposition of the Lok Sabha, Gaurav Gogoi.

Gogoi was a member of the Assam Legislative Assembly from 2001 to until his death in 2020 from Titabar constituency and from Margherita constituency from 1996 to 1998. He was the member of Lok Sabha representing Kaliabor from 1991 to 1996 and again from 1998 to 2001 and Jorhat constituency from 1971 to 1984. He was also Minister of State (Independent Charge) for Food and Processing Industries in the P. V. Narasimha Rao ministry from 1993 to 1995. He was posthumously awarded the Padma Bhushan, India's third-highest civilian honour, in 2021.

== Early life ==
Tarun Gogoi was born on 1 April 1936 into an Tai-Ahom family at Rangajan Tea Estate, erstwhile Sibsagar District, now the Jorhat District of Assam. His father, Kamaleshwar Gogoi was a medical practitioner at Rangajan Tea Estate. His mother, Usha Gogoi, was the younger sister of the Assamese poet Ganesh Gogoi. He is the elder brother Dip Gogoi, who also served as Member of Parliament for Kaliabor and Member of Assam Legislstive Assembly for Titabar.

He began his primary education at No. 26 Rangajan Nimna Buniyadi Vidyalaya (lower foundation school), before moving on to Jorhat Madrassa School (through class IV), and Bholaguri High School (through class VI). He passed his Higher Secondary School Certificate (HSLC) exam from the Jorhat Government High School, before graduating from the Jagannath Barooah College. He obtained his Bachelor of Laws (LLB) degree from Gauhati University.

== Political career ==
Gogoi started his political career as a member of the municipal board at Jorhat in 1968 before being elected to the Fifth Lok Sabha in 1971 from Jorhat. He represented Jorhat in Lok Sabha through the next two terms until 1985. He represented Kaliabor in the Tenth Lok Sabha between 1991 and 1996, and the Twelfth and Thirteenth Lok Sabha between 1998 and 2001. He quit the Thirteenth Lok Sabha, mid-term, to assume office as the Chief Minister of Assam in 2001, serving a total of six terms as a member of parliament.

During his second term in the Lok Sabha, he was elected as a Joint Secretary of the All India Congress Committee (AICC) in 1976, under Congress leader and Prime Minister, Indira Gandhi. He later served as a General Secretary of the AICC, from 1985 to 1990, under Congress leader and Prime Minister, Rajiv Gandhi. He served in the Union Cabinet of India under Prime Minister, P. V. Narasimha Rao, as the Union Minister of State in the Ministry of Food Processing Industries between 1991 and 1996. He was a member of the Committee on Government Assurances, Consultative Committee, Union Ministry of Petroleum and Natural Gas, and Committee on External Affairs in the Tenth Lok Sabha. In the Thirteenth Lok Sabha he was a member of the Committee on Railways. Appreciators believe that during his tenure as the chief minister, he is credited with ending militant insurgency and mitigating violence in addition to improving the state's fiscal condition.

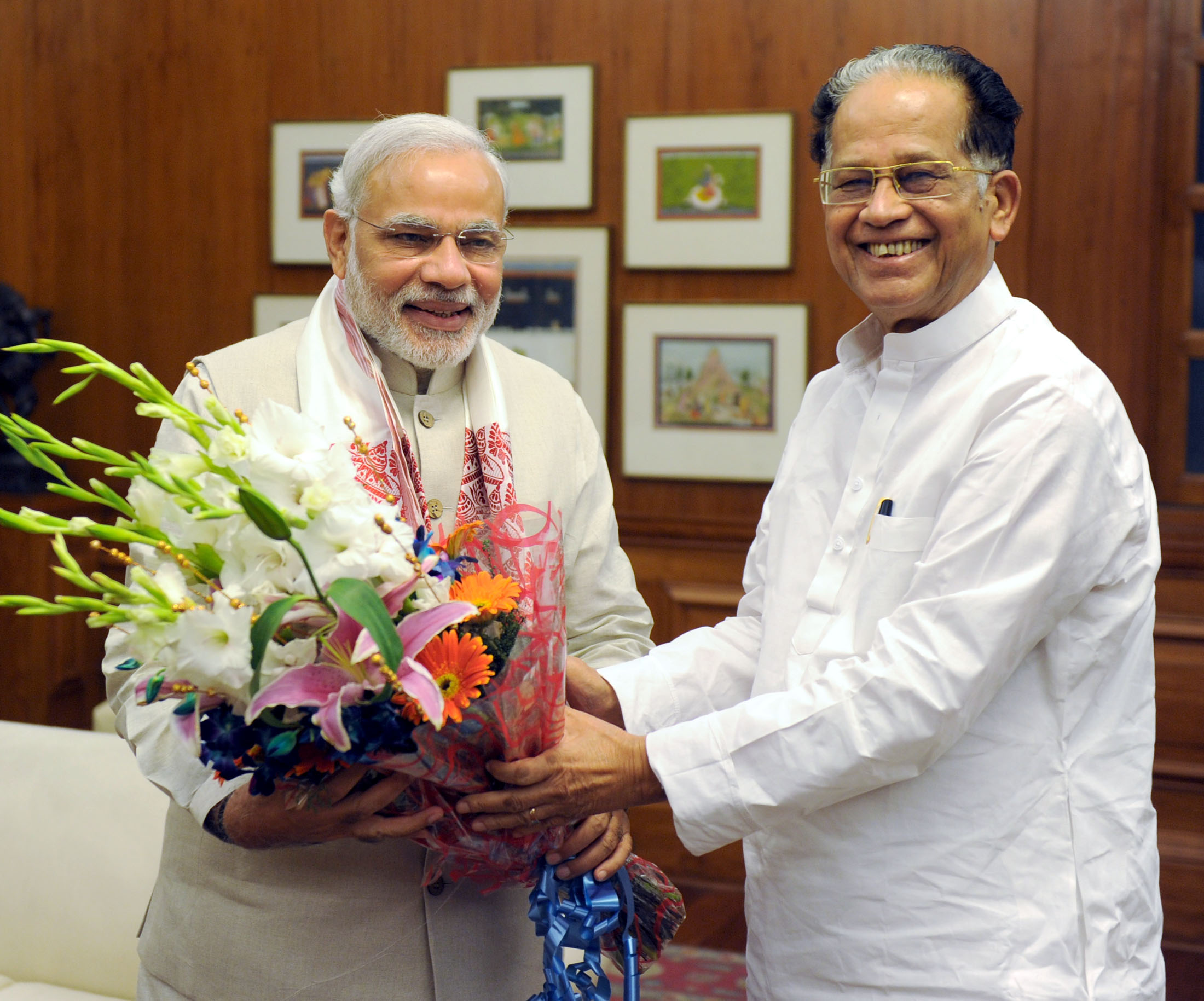
Gogoi with Prime Minister Narendra Modi on 29 October 2014

He served as the President of the Assam Pradesh Congress Committee (APCC) between 1986 and 1990, before being appointed as the President again in 1996. Through has state legislative career he served four terms as a Member of Legislative Assembly (MLA). He first represented the Margherita constituency between 1996 and 1998, and the Titabar constituency since 2001.

=== Chief Ministership ===
==== First term ====
Gogoi lead the Indian National Congress in the 2001 Assam Legislative Assembly election, with congress securing 70 seats in the Assembly. On 18 May 2001, Gogoi was unanimously elected leader of the Congress legislative party and was sworn in as the Chief Minister of Assam. He succeeded the Asom Gana Parishad government led by Prafulla Kumar Mahanta. Gogoi was faced with the onerous task of bringing the state out of the morass of militant violence and financial instability characterised by a huge debt burden with even government employees not receiving their salaries on time. During the ministry self employment schemes to counter terrorism, the Police Commission for smooth functioning of administration of State, the Chief Vigilance Commission to prevent corruption and the right to information bill were all established.

On 6 August 2003, a motion of no-confidence was filed against the ministry of Gogoi jointly by AGP, BJP and ASDC.

Initiating the discussion, Brindaban Goswami said that the people of Assam had brought the Congress to power expecting a clean and transparent Government. But, the present Government had drowned into several corruption scandals. He also referred to the ethnic conflict between the Demasa-Hmar group and alleged that the law and order situation had worsened in the last two years. Consequently, innocent people had been killed. Opposition parties were not allowed to function freely and even the party office of BJP was ransacked by miscreants in broad daylight. He further alleged that the Government had not taken any steps for the detection and deportation of foreigners.

In his reply, Gogoi described all the allegations made against him and his Ministry as baseless. Gogoi said that the AGP had no right to criticise the present Government as they had ruined the socio-economic condition of State when it was in power. The present Government had tried to improve the conditions and had succeeded to some extent. The Central Government had sanctioned more funds to the State for rural development and the public distribution system. He gave a detailed description of the increase in the tax collection, revenue collection and per capita income and said the State was making progress on diverse fronts. The Government had been trying its best to prevent corruption. Regarding the law and order situation, he said the situation had returned to normal and an initiative had been taken for discussion with the Demasa-Hmar and other extremist groups. The motion was debated on 8 August 2003 and was defeated by voice-vote.

Assam's GSDP at constant (1999-2000) prices increased 5.33 percent annually between 2002 and 2007.

==== Second term ====
Gogoi again led Congress in the 2006 Assam Legislative Assembly Election and Congress received 53 seats, 9 less than the 64 needed for a majority, Gogoi's initiative in this direction paid dividends with the Congress returning to power for the second consecutive term, albeit with lesser seats, and formed the government in alliance with its coalition partner Bodoland People's Front (BPF). During the ministry the law-and-order situation abruptly improved and the financial condition of the state improved. Gogoi gave importance to implementation of the schemes of the Central Government by different departments of the state. He also gave importance for industrialization of the state. He also took initiative to solve the insurgency problems of Assam through negotiation.

Assam's real GSDP increased 6.78 percent annually between 2007 and 2012.

==== Third term ====
In the 2011 Assam Legislative Assembly election, Gogoi again led the congress party. Congress received 78 seats with an increased majority of 25 seats. Stemming from dissent within the party that saw 32 MLAs resign, he could not get the Indian National Congress to victory in the 2016 legislative assembly elections. Sarbananda Sonowal from the Bharatiya Janata Party went on to win the elections and become the chief minister.

Assam's real GSDP at constant (2011–12) prices increased approximately 7.6 percent annually between 2012 and 2016.

=== Political legacy ===
In his career as the chief minister of Assam, Tarun Gogoi is credited with having brought the many militant outfits operating in the state including the United Liberation Front of Asom (ULFA) to the negotiating table and mitigating militant insurgency within the state. It is noted that when he started his tenure, militant insurgency was at the peak in the State with multiple bomb blasts in Guwahati triggered by ULFA, riots and violent demands for accession in the Bodoland Territorial Region, and militant attacks on Hindi speakers. By the time he ended his tenure as the chief minister, an improved law and order and a relatively violence-free tenure were considered his legacy.

He is also credited with improving the state's fiscal position, getting the state out from close to bankruptcy, and engineering an economic turnaround in the implementation of various state government-led relief schemes, particularly for the rural areas. His initiation of development projects in the state is credited with having stopped the flight of capital out of the state.

Updating of the National Register of Citizens for Assam began during his tenure as the chief minister.

Gogoi was posthumously included in the list of Padma Bhushan awardees, India's third-highest civilian honour, for 2021.

== Personal life ==
=== Family and interests ===
Gogoi married Dolly Gogoi, a post-graduate in zoology from Gauhati University, on 30 July 1972. The couple have two children, a daughter, Chandrima Gogoi, an MBA, and a son, Gaurav Gogoi, a member of parliament from Kaliabor. His son holds a degree in Public administration from the New York University. His profile at the state legislature has him marked as a hobby Golfer.

Gogoi visited several countries in his lifetime, and by 2014 had made 18 official foreign trips since 2001. Countries Gogoi visited included Indonesia, Singapore, Canada, the UK, Italy, Sri Lanka, the US, China, Switzerland, France, Bhutan, Bangladesh, Spain, Belgium, South Korea, Japan, Vietnam and Thailand.

=== Health ===
He had had multiple heart surgeries during the latter part of his second term as the chief minister, including Bypass surgery, Aortic valve replacement, and a procedure to artificially enlarge the aorta, at Mumbai's Asian Heart Institute. He had an additional surgery just before the elections for his third term in 2011, to replace his Artificial cardiac pacemaker. Gogoi had gone on to lead his party to a third term victory, recovering from these health issues.

== Death and funeral ==
=== Illness and death ===
Gogoi tested positive for COVID-19 on 25 August 2020. He was admitted to the Guwahati Medical College and Hospital on 26 August. On 31 August, after a sudden fall in oxygen saturation level, he was given a blood plasma transplant and was later stable. On 16 September, Gogoi tested negative for COVID. On 24 September, he was later readmitted to the ICU following post-COVID-19 complications.

On 25 October, Gogoi was discharged from hospital, though Health Minister Himanta Biswa Sarma stated his further treatment would continue at his official residence. Gogoi was hospitalised again on 2 November after he complained of breathing problems the previous night and was immediately shifted to the ICU to put him on NIV because of high ammonia levels, a week after he had been discharged.

On 21 November, Gogoi suffered a multi-organ failure and was on dialysis with his blood pressure fluctuating, and was put on ventilator support. His son Gaurav, along with Chief Secretary Jishnu Barua rushed to visit him. Gogoi's daughter, Chandrima arrived from the US on 21 November in Guwahati and arrived at GMCH on 22 November to visit Gogoi.

On 23 November 2020, at 5:34 PM, Gogoi was pronounced dead at the Gauhati Medical College and Hospital due to COVID-19 induced complications and multiple organ failure, aged 84. His wife, Dolly, his son Gaurav and daughter Chandrima, were all at his side among other relatives.

=== Reaction ===
Many political figures and leaders including Prime Minister Narendra Modi, President Ram Nath Kovind, Vice President Venkaiah Naidu, Rahul Gandhi, Congress President Sonia Gandhi, former Prime Minister Manmohan Singh, Congress leader in Rajya Sabha Mallikarjun Kharge, Commerce minister Piyush Goyal, Home Minister Amit Shah, Finance Minister Nirmala Sitharaman and Defence Minister Rajanath Singh all expressed condolences. Former and incumbent chief ministers also paid tribute including Zoramthanga, N. Biren Singh, Mamata Banerjee, B. S. Yediyurappa, Amarinder Singh, Arvind Kejriwal, Ashok Gehlot, M. K. Stalin, Akhilesh Yadav, Sharad Pawar, Shivraj Singh Chouhan, Chief Minister of Assam Sarbananda Sonowal and Bhumidhar Barman. Many other politicians including MPs, state legislators and state ministers also offered their tributes. In a statement, Chief Minister Sarbananda Sonowal said:

"I am deeply saddened by the demise of former chief minister Tarun Gogoi. With his death, the state has lost an experienced, capable and efficient political leader. The people of Assam will always remember his committed service and contributions to the state. His sense of humour, amiable and outspoken nature attracted everyone. He set high ethical values in the field of politics with his simple life-style and contributed profusely in strengthening democratic values in the country"

— Sarbananda Sonowal, 23 November 2020

=== Funeral ===
Gogoi's body was kept at Srimanta Sankardeva Kalakshetra, a cultural institution in Guwahati, for people to pay their respects. On 23 November, Sarbananda Sonowal announced a three-day state mourning for Gogoi while visiting Gogoi's remains. On 25 November, Congress Leader Rahul Gandhi visited Guwahati to pay tribute to Gogoi and meet with Gogoi's family. The funeral procession with Gogoi's mortal remains began on 26 November from Sankardeb Kalakshetra, a cultural centre in Guwahati, where his body was kept for viewing since 24 November. The remains were first taken to his official residence. Then his remains were taken to a church at Six Mile in Guwahati, then to one at Naamghar at Zoo Road after which he was taken to Burha Jame Masjid at Ambari and then to Ugratara temple near Latasil before his cremation. This was done as per Gogoi's wishes.

On 26 November, the funeral rites were performed with full state honours at the Nabagraha Cremation ground in Guwahati. Gaurav Gogoi, lit the pyre after performing the rituals. Gogoi's wife Dolly, daughter Chandrima, daughter-in-law Elizabeth, and other family members placed sandalwood on the pyre before it was lit by Gaurav. Many politicians were present, including Chief Minister Sarbananda Sonowal, Finance Minister Himanta Biswa Sarma, state BJP President Ranjeet Kumar Dass and state Congress president Ripun Bora.

== Positions ==
Sources

- 1968: Member, Municipal Board, Jorhat.
- 1971: Elected to 5th Lok Sabha.
- 1976: Joint Secretary, All India Congress Committee.
- 1977: Re-elected to 6th Lok Sabha (2nd term).
- 1983: Re-elected to 7th Lok Sabha (3rd term).
- 1983: Joint Secretary All India Congress Committee (AICC(I)).
- 1985: General Secretary, All India Congress Committee (AICC(I)).
- 1986–1990: President, Pradesh Congress Committee (P.C.C.(I)), Assam.
- 1991–1993: Union Minister of State (Independent Charge) Ministry of Food.
- 1993–1995: Union Minister of State (Independent Charge). Ministry of Food Processing Industry.
- 1993–1995: Member, Assam Legislative Assembly.
- 1997–1998: Elected as Member of ALA.
- 1998–99: Member, Committee on Government Assurances.
- 1998–99: Member, Committee on External Affairs.
- 1998–99: Member, Consultative Committee, Ministry of Petroleum and Natural Gas.
- 1998: Re-elected to 12th Lok Sabha (5th term).
- 1999: Re-elected to 13th Lok Sabha (6th term).
- 1999–2000: Member, Committee on Railways.
- 18 May 2001: Assumed the Office of Chief Minister, Assam. (1st Term)
- Sept-2001: Elected as Member of ALA.
- 11 May 2006: Elected as Member of ALA.
- 14 May 2006: Assumed the Office of Chief Minister, Assam. (2nd Term)
- 13 May 2011: Elected as Member of ALA.
- 18 May 2011: Assumed the Office of Chief Minister, Assam. (3rd Term)
- 19 May 2016: Elected as MLA from 100 Titabar LAC.

Lok Sabha
Preceded by Rajendranath Barua	Member of Parliament for Jorhat; 1971–1984	Succeeded by Parag Chaliha
Preceded by Bhadreswar Tanti	Member of Parliament for Kaliabor; 1991–1996	Succeeded by Keshab Mahanta
Preceded by Keshab Mahanta	Member of Parliament for Kaliabor; 1998–2001	Succeeded by Dip Gogoi
Political offices
Preceded by Prafulla Kumar Mahanta	Chief Minister of Assam; 17 May 2001 – 24 May 2016	Succeeded by Sarbananda Sonowal
