= Probin Kumar Gogoi =

Indian politician

Probin Gogoi was an Asom Gana Parishad politician from Assam, India. He was elected to the Assam Legislative Assembly in the 1985, 1996, 2002 and 2006 election, specifically to the Khumtai constituency. He was the minister of sports and civil supply in the Prafulla Kumar Mahanta cabinet during its first term in 1995.

He died on 12 October 2016 at Guwahati Medical College Hospital, Guwahati, after a prolonged illness. He was 66.
