= Department of Agriculture and Horticulture (Assam) =

Government department in Assam

- কৃষি আৰু উদ্যান শস্য বিভাগ (Assamese)
- State emblem of Assam

Department overview
- Formed: 1950; 76 years ago
- Jurisdiction: Government of Assam
- Headquarters: Block, 1st Floor, Janata Bhawan (Civil) Dispur, Guwahati-781006
- Minister responsible: Pijush Hazarika, Minister
- Department executives: Aruna Rajoria, IAS, Commissioner and Secretary; Tej Prasad Bhusal, ACS, Secretary
- Child agencies: Directorate of Agriculture; Directorate of Horticulture and Food Processing; Assam Seeds Corporation Limited; Assam Seed and Organic Certification Agency; Assam State Agriculture Marketing Board; State Agriculture Management and Extension Training Institute; Assam Small Farmers' Agri Business Consortium
- Website: Official website

The Department of Agriculture and Horticulture (Assamese: কৃষি আৰু উদ্যান শস্য বিভাগ) is a department in the state government of Assam, India which is responsible for the administration and promotion of agriculture in the state, regulation of agrarian services, ensuring food security and food processing, and improving livelihoods of the farming community.

The department is headed by a minister usually of cabinet rank, or the Minister of Agriculture, currently Atul Bora who has been in office since 24 May 2016.

== History ==
The history behind the creation of the Department of Agriculture in Assam dates back to April 1882 during the colonial rule. The department was responsible for conducting crop-cutting experiments on winter rice, mustard and sugarcane cultivation in the state to assess the productivity of land preparation and assessment proposals during settlement.

In 1893, an Agricultural Conference was held in Shimla and based on the recommendations of the conference, the British Government deputed Sir E. Buck to Assam in 1895 to discuss and implement the conference's recommendations in Assam. Buck advocated the appointment of an agricultural expert to ascertain agricultural defects and introduce agricultural improvements. In 1897, B. C. Basu, a Deputy Collector in Bengal, was appointed as assistant director.

In 1905, following the partition of Bengal and the subsequent creation of the Eastern Bengal and Assam province, the Department of Agriculture was separated in 1907 to form the Department of Land Records and Agriculture. Assam became a separate province again in 1912 and the Department of Land Records and Agriculture continued to exist until 1922. In 1923, the Department of Agriculture, Cooperation and Industries was established.

Following India's independence in 1947 and the subsequent formation of the state government under the chief ministership of Gopinath Bordoloi, the Department of Agriculture was formed in the state. Omeo Kumar Das was appointed as the state's first agriculture minister. Since then, the department has existed.

== Organisation ==
The Department of Agriculture and Horticulture is the nodal agency and is administered through two directorates and five specialised agencies:

=== Directorate of Agriculture ===
The Directorate of Agriculture (Assamese: কৃষি সঞ্চালকালয়) is responsible for the formulation and implementation of the state's agrarian policies and programmes aimed at achieving rapid agricultural growth through optimum utilisation of land, water, soil and plant resources and implementation of beneficiary-oriented schemes for the economic upliftment of the farmers. The directorate also establishes farmer-dependent coordination in implementing and providing technological knowledge to the farming community through agricultural extension services.

The directorate is also responsible for creating assured irrigation facilities for farmers through minor irrigation schemes, promoting the use of farmer-friendly bio-fertilisers, encouraging farmers to minimise pesticide use, and controlling environmental pollution through integrated pest management. It also monitors soil health, educates farmers on soil and water conservation technologies, undertakes measures to provide agricultural credit and crop insurance, helps the farmers in getting remunerative returns for their produce, and implements flood and drought relief programmes. It also contributes towards the economic empowerment of women and the eradication of rural poverty.

The directorate is responsible for overseeing the implementation of the following schemes and projects:

- Pradhan Mantri Kisan Samman Nidhi
- Mukhya Mantri Krishi Sa Sajuli Yozana
- National e-Governance Plan-Agriculture (NeGP-A)
- National Food Security Mission (NFSM)
- National Mission for Sustainable Agriculture (NMSA)
- National Mission on Agriculture Extension Technology (NMAET)
- National Mission on Oil Seeds and Oil Palm (NMOOP)
- Pradhan Mantri Fasal Bima Yojana (PMFBY)
- Pradhan Mantri Krishi Sinchayee Yojana (PMKSY)
- Rashtriya Krishi Vikash Yojana (RKVY)
- Rural Infrastructure Development Fund (RIDF)
- Chief Minister Samagra Gramya Unnayan Yojana (CMSGUY)

=== Directorate of Horticulture and Food Processing ===
The Directorate of Horticulture and Food Processing (Assamese: উদ্যান শস্য আৰু খাদ্য প্ৰক্ৰিয়াকৰণ সঞ্চালকালয়) is responsible for the formulation and implementation of policies and programmes aimed at achieving rapid growth of the horticultural sector and ensuring an increase in area coverage to increase production and productivity of horticultural crops by transferring technology. It also undertakes all possible measures to ensure a timely and adequate supply of quality planting materials and motivates farmers to minimise the use of chemicals and adopt organic farming practices.

The directorate also aims to increase the production and productivity of fruit crops, vegetable crops, and spice crops and ensure good health and augment market and marketing facilities.

The Directorate of Horticulture and Food Processing is responsible for the implementation of the following schemes and projects:

- Bee Keeping Scheme
- Coconut Development Scheme
- Horticulture Mission for North East and Himalayan States (HMNEH)
- Pradhan Mantri Krishi Sinchayee Yojana -Per Drop More Crop (PMKSY-PDMC)
- Mission Organic Value Chain Development in Assam (MOVCDA)
- Pradhan Mantri Fasal Bima Yojana (PMFBY)
- Rashtriya Krishi Vikash Yojana (RKVY)
- SASMIRA Scheme for Agro-Textile
- State Plan Scheme

=== Assam Seeds Corporation Limited ===
The Assam Seeds Corporation Limited (Assamese: অসম বীজ নিগম লিমিটেড) (ASCL) was established in 1967 to provide unique services for the production of all kinds of high-yielding varieties of seeds to the farmers and other customers at a fair price. It also produces foundation seeds from breeder seed on its own farm, which are then procured from the Assam Agricultural University.

=== Assam Seed and Organic Certification Agency ===
The Assam Seed and Organic Certification Agency (Assamese: অসম বীজ আৰু জৈৱিক প্ৰমাণীকৰণ সংস্থা) (ASOCA) was established on 1 January 1985 as an autonomous body of the Government of Assam under the Seed Act 1966 and was registered under the Societies Registration Act, 1860. The agency recognises varieties of seeds eligible for seed certification and publishes and maintains lists indicating the names of such varieties and kinds.

=== Assam State Agricultural Marketing Board ===
The Assam State Agricultural Marketing Board (Assamese: অসম ৰাজ্যিক কৃষি বিপণন ব’ৰ্ড) (ASAMB) was established under the Assam Agricultural Produce Market (AAPM) Act 1972 to provide for better regulation of buying and selling of agricultural produce and the establishment of a market for agricultural produce in the state of Assam. The board is responsible for the coordination of the working of the market committees for the development of the market and market areas and state level planning of the development of agricultural produce and markets.

=== State Agriculture Management and Extension Training Institute ===
The State Agriculture Management and Extension Training Institute (Assamese: ৰাজ্যিক কৃষি ব্যৱস্থাপনা আৰু সম্প্ৰসাৰণ প্ৰশিক্ষণ প্ৰতিষ্ঠান) (SAMETI) is the state-level nodal training institute of Tripura, established under the scheme "Support to State Extension Programme for Extension Reform" in the year 2011 at Krishi Bhavan Campus, Khanapara, Guwahati. The institution is autonomous in nature, with greater flexibility in structure and functioning, and is responsible for human resource development and capacity building of extension functionaries of different line departments on scientific extension management.

=== Assam Small Farmers' Agri Business Consortium ===
The Assam Small Farmers' Agri Business Consortium (Assamese: অসম ক্ষুদ্ৰ কৃষকৰ কৃষি ব্যৱসায় সংঘ) (ASFAC) was established on 1 October 2001 and was registered under the Societies Registration Act, 1860 on 24 December 2001. The agency functions to catalyse agro industrial growth in different parts of Assam based on principles of ecological sustainability, economic efficiency and social equity, and undertakes programmes for employment generation, growth and diversification of agriculture and other food based industries to increase food production and export of food products.

== Ministers ==
| Portrait | Minister (Birth-Death) Constituency | Term of office | | | Political party | Ministry | Chief Minister |
| Portrait | Minister (Birth-Death) Constituency | From | To | Period | Political party | Ministry | Chief Minister |
|---|---|---|---|---|---|---|---|
| | Ali Haider Khan আলী হায়দৰ খান (1896–1963); MLA for Sylhet South | 1 April 1937 | 4 February 1938 | | United Muslim Party | Saadulah l | Muhammed Saadulah |
| Standing (l to r) J.J.M. Nichols-Roy, Syed Sir Mohammad Saadullah, Abdul Matin Chaudhury | Abdul Matin Chaudhury আব্দুল মতিন চৌধুৰী (1895–1948); MLA for Sylhet Sadar | 5 February 1938 | 18 September 1938 | 7 months,13 days | All-India Muslim League | Saadulah l | Muhammed Saadulah |
| Seated (l to r) Rohini Kumar Choudhury, Munawar Ali, Akshay Kumar Das | Akshay Kumar Das অক্ষয় কুমাৰ দাস (1903–19); MLA for Sunamganj | 19 September 1938 | 17 November 1939 | 1 year,1 month,29 days | Constitutionalist Party | Bordoloi l | Gopinath Bordoloi |
| Seated (l to r) Rohini Kumar Choudhury, Munawar Ali, Akshay Kumar Das | Munawwar Ali মুনৱ্বৰ আলী (1896–1963); MLA for Assembly constituency | 17 November 1939 | 24 December 1941 | 2 years,1 month,7 days | All-India Muslim League | Saadulah ll | Muhammed Saadulah |
| | Naba Kumar Dutta নবা কুমাৰ দত্ত (); MLA for Assembly constituency | 25 August 1942 | 23 March 1945 | 2 years,6 months,26 days | Assam United Party | Saadulah lll | Muhammed Saadulah |
| | Rupnath Brahma ৰূপনাথ ব্ৰহ্ম (1902–1968); MLA for Sidli | 23 March 1945 | 11 February 1946 | 10 months,19 days | Tribal League | Saadulah lll | Muhammed Saadulah |
| Seated beside Rupnath Brahma from Right side | Abdul Matlib Mazumdar আব্দুল মতলিব মজুমদাৰ (1890–1980); MLA for Hailakandi | 11 February 1946 | 15 August 1947 | 1 year,6 months,4 days | Indian National Congress | Bordoloi ll | Gopinath Bordoloi |
| Seated beside Rupnath Brahma from Right side | Abdul Matlib Mazumdar আব্দুল মতলিব মজুমদাৰ (1890–1980); MLA for Hailakandi | 15 August 1947 | 26 January 1950 | 2 years,5 months,11 days | Indian National Congress | Bordoloi ll | Gopinath Bordoloi |
| | Omeo Kumar Das ওমেও কুমাৰ দাস (1895–1975); MLA for Dhekiajuli North | 26 January 1950 | 5 August 1950 | 2 years, 61 days | Indian National Congress | Bordoloi | Gopinath Bordoloi |
| | Omeo Kumar Das ওমেও কুমাৰ দাস (1895–1975); MLA for Dhekiajuli North | 9 August 1950 | 27 March 1952 | 2 years, 61 days | Indian National Congress | Medhi I | Bishnuram Medhi |
| | Ram Nath Das ৰাম নাথ দাস; MLA for Jorhat North | 28 March 1952 | 21 April 1957 | 5 years, 24 days | Indian National Congress | Medhi II | Bishnuram Medhi |
| | Moinul Hoque Choudhury মইনুল হকে চৌধুৰী (1923–1976); MLA for Silchar East | 21 April 1957 | 27 December 1957 | 9 years, 329 days | Indian National Congress | Medhi III | Bishnuram Medhi |
| | Moinul Hoque Choudhury মইনুল হকে চৌধুৰী (1923–1976); MLA for Silchar East | 27 December 1957 | 1 March 1962 | 9 years, 329 days | Indian National Congress | Chaliha I | Bimala Prasad Chaliha |
| | Moinul Hoque Choudhury মইনুল হকে চৌধুৰী (1923–1976); MLA for Silchar East | 1 March 1962 | 16 March 1967 | 9 years, 329 days | Indian National Congress | Chaliha II | Bimala Prasad Chaliha |
| | Lakshmi Prasad Goswami লক্ষ্মী প্ৰসাদ গোস্বামী MLA for Jamunamukh | 16 March 1967 | 11 November 1970 | 3 years, 240 days | Indian National Congress | Chaliha III | Bimala Prasad Chaliha |
| | Ataur Rahman Choudhury অতৌৰ ৰহমান চৌধুৰী MLA for Chenga | 11 November 1970 | 31 January 1972 | 1 year, 81 days | Indian National Congress | Choudhry | Mahendra Mohan Choudhry |
| | Upendra Das উপেন্দ্ৰ দাস; MLA for Rangamati | 31 January 1972 | 12 October 1974 | 2 years, 254 days | Indian National Congress | Sinha | Sarat Chandra Sinha |
| | Mohammad Umaruddin মহম্মদ উমাৰুদ্দিন; MLA for Dhubri | 12 October 1974 | 12 March 1978 | 3 years, 151 days | Indian National Congress | Sinha | Sarat Chandra Sinha |
| | Soneswar Boro সোণেশ্বৰ বড়ো MLA for Golaghat | 12 March 1978 | 4 September 1979 | 1 year, 176 days | Janata Party | Borbora | Golap Borbora |
| | Santi Ranjan Das Gupta শান্তি ৰঞ্জন দাস গুপ্তা MLA for Hojai | 9 September 1979 | 11 December 1979 | 93 days | Janata Party | Hazarika | Jogendra Nath Hazarika |
Position vacant during this interval
| | Anwara Taimur আনোৱাৰা টাইমুৰ (1936–2020); MLA for Dalgaon | 6 December 1980 | 30 June 1981 | 206 days | Indian National Congress | Taimur | Anwara Taimur |
Position vacant during this interval
| | Santi Ranjan Das Gupta শান্তি ৰঞ্জন দাস গুপ্তা MLA for Hojai | 13 January 1982 | 19 March 1982 | 65 days | Janata Party | Keshab | Keshab Chandra Gogoi |
Position vacant during this interval
| | Ranendra Narayan Basumatary ৰানেন্দ্ৰ নাৰায়ণ বসুমতাৰী MLA for Kokrajhar West | 28 February 1983 | 23 December 1985 | 2 years, 298 days | Indian National Congress | Saikia I | Hiteswar Saikia |
| | Nilamoni Das নীলামণি দাস; MLA for Mangaldoi | 24 December 1985 | 28 November 1990 | 4 years, 339 days | Asom Gana Parishad | Mahanta I | Prafulla Kumar Mahanta |
Position vacant during this interval
| | Anwara Taimur আনোৱাৰা টাইমুৰ (1936–2020); MLA for Dalgaon | 30 June 1991 | 14 May 1996 | 4 years, 319 days | Indian National Congress | Saikia II | Hiteswar Saikia |
| | Anwara Taimur আনোৱাৰা টাইমুৰ (1936–2020); MLA for Dalgaon | 30 June 1991 | 14 May 1996 | 4 years, 319 days | Indian National Congress | Barman | Bhumidhar Barman |
| | Chandra Mohan Patowary চন্দ্ৰ মোহন পাটোৱাৰী (born 1955); MLA for Dharmapur | 15 May 1996 | 17 May 2001 | 5 years, 2 days | Asom Gana Parishad | Mahanta II | Prafulla Kumar Mahanta |
| | Ardhendu Kumar Dey অৰ্ধেন্দু কুমাৰ দে (1938–2022); MLA for Hojai | 17 May 2001 | 21 May 2006 | 5 years, 4 days | Indian National Congress | Tarun I | Tarun Gogoi |
| | Pramila Rani Brahma প্ৰমিলা ৰাণী ব্ৰহ্ম (born 1951); MLA for Kokrajhar East | 21 May 2006 | 18 May 2011 | 4 years, 362 days | Bodoland People's Front | Tarun II | Tarun Gogoi |
| | Nilamani Sen Deka নীলামণি সেন ডেকা (born 1953); MLA for Dharmapur | 30 May 2011 | 26 January 2015 | 3 years, 241 days | Indian National Congress | Tarun III | Tarun Gogoi |
| | Rakibul Hussain ৰকিবুল হুছেইন (born 1964); MLA for Samaguri | 26 January 2015 | 24 May 2016 | 1 year, 119 days | Indian National Congress | Tarun III | Tarun Gogoi |
| | Atul Bora অতুল বৰা (born 1960); MLA for Bokakhat | 25 May 2016 | Incumbent | 10 years, 109 days | Asom Gana Parishad | Sonowal | Sarbananda Sonowal |
| | Atul Bora অতুল বৰা (born 1960); MLA for Bokakhat | 25 May 2016 | Incumbent | 10 years, 109 days | Asom Gana Parishad | Sarma I | Himanta Biswa Sarma |
| | Himanta Biswa Sarma হিমন্ত বিশ্ব শৰ্মা (born 1969); MLA for Jalukbari (Chief Minister) | 12 May 2026 | 5 June 2026 | 24 days | Bharatiya Janata Party | Sarma II | Himanta Biswa Sarma |
| | Pijush Hazarika পিজুশ হাজৰিকা (born 1977); MLA for Jagiroad | 5 June 2026 | Incumbent | 98 days | Bharatiya Janata Party | Sarma II | Himanta Biswa Sarma |

== See also ==
- Government of Assam
- Ministry of Agriculture and Farmers' Welfare
- Department of Agriculture Development & Farmers' Welfare (Kerala)
- Ministry of Agriculture (Maharashtra)
- Department of Agriculture (Tamil Nadu)
- Department of Agriculture (West Bengal)
