= 1946 Assam Legislative Assembly election =

1946 provincial election in British India

- 1946

All 108 seats to the Assam Legislative Assembly 55 seats needed for a majority
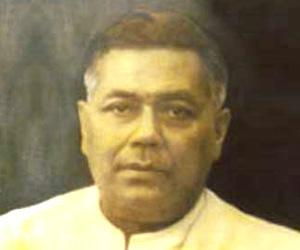

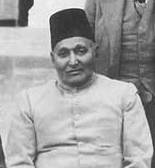
	First party	Second party
Leader	Gopinath Bordoloi	Muhammed Saadulah
Party	INC	AIML
Leader's seat	Kamrup Sadar (South)	Kamrup (South)
Last election	33	4
Seats won	58	31
Seat change	▲25	▲27
Premier before election
Muhammed Saadulah
AIML
Premier
Gopinath Bordoloi
INC

Elections were held to the Assam Legislative Assembly in 1946.

== History ==
After Congress won a majority of seats in the election, Gopinath Bordoloi formed a ministry.

== Results ==
Party or group	Seats won
Indian National Congress	58
All-India Muslim League	31
Europeans	9
Independents	7
Others	3
Total	108

== Elected members ==
Constituency	Member
South Sylhet (West)	Abala Kanta Gupta
Dhubri (North)	Raja Ajit Narayan Dev
Sunamganj (Reserved)	Akshay Kumar Das
Indian Planting (Surma Valley)	Baidyanath Mookerjee
Sylhet Sadar (South Reserved)	Basanta Kumar Das
Kamrup Sadar (South)	Beliram Das
Mangaldoi (North Reserved)	Bipin Chandra Medhi
Dibrugarh (Central)	Bhadra Kanta Gogoi
Hailakandi	Bidyapati Singha
Tezpur (East)	Bijoy Chandra Bhagavati
Dibrugarh (West)	Bijoy Chandra Saikia
Sibsagar (West)	Bimala Prasad Chaliha
Kamrup Sadar (Central)	Bishnuram Medhi
Golaghat (South)	Dandeswar Hazarika
Jorhat (North)	Debeswar Sarmah
Nalbari	Gauri Kanta Talukdar
Sylhet Sadar (North)	Gopesh Chandra Pal
Kamrup Sadar (South)	Gopinath Bordoloi
Nowgong (West)	Haladhar Bhuyan
Indian Planting (Assam Valley)	Harendra Nath Sarma
Goalpara (North-West)	Hareswar Das
Jorhat (South)	Harinarayan Baruah
North Lakhimpur	Hem Chandra Hazarika
Habiganj (North Reserved)	Jagat Bandhu Sircar
Sunamganj	Jatindra Nath Bhadra
Barpeta (North)	Kameswar Das
Karimganj (East)	Kamini Kumar Sen
Nowgaon (North-East Reserved)	Khagendra Nath Samaddar
Dibrugarh (East)	Laksheswar Borooah
Kamrup Sadar (South)	Lakshmidhar Borah
Barpeta	Mahendra Mohan Choudhury
Nowgong (South-East)	Motiram Bora
Goalpara (South-East)	Manisankar Basumatari
Silchar (Reserved)	Nibaran Chandra Laskar
Habiganj (South)	Nirendra Nath Dev
Tezpur (West)	Omeo Kumar Das
Indian Commerce and Industry	Prabhudayal Himatsingka
Mangaldoi (North-East)	Purandar Sarma
Nowgong (North-East)	Purna Chandra Sarma
Sibsagar (East)	Purnananda Chetia
South Sylhet (East)	Purnendu Kishore Sen Gupta
Karimganj (West)	Rabindra Nath Aditya
Golaghat (North)	Rajendra Nath Barua
Jorhat (North Reserved)	Ram Nath Das
Karimganj (East Reserved)	Ramesh Chandra Das Choudhury
Dhubri (South)	Santosh Kumar Barua
Dhubri (Central)	Sarat Chandra Sinha
Silchar	Satindra Mohan Dev
Kamrup Sadar (North)	Siddhi Nath Sarma
Habiganj (North)	Suresh Chandra Biswas
Habiganj (South-East)	Muhammad Abdullah
Dhubri (West)	Abdul Majid Ziaosh Shams
Dhubri (South)	Muhammad Abdul Kasham
Sunamganj (South)	Abdul Bari Choudhury
South Sylhet (Central)	Dewan Abdul Basith
Kamrup (North)	Abdul Hai
Sylhet Sadar (Central)	Abdul Hamid
Sunamganj (West)	Abdul Khaleque Ahmed
Goalpara (East)	Abdul Kuddus Khan
Karimganj (Central)	Md. Abdul Latif
Darrang	Abdul Matin Chaudhuri
Hailakandi	Abdul Matlib Mazumdar
Sylhet Sadar (East)	Abdur Rasheed
Sylhet Sadar (South)	Dewan Abdur Rob Choudhury
Barpeta	Syed Abdur Rouf
Nowgong (East)	Afazuddin Ahmed
South Sylhet (East)	Md. Ali Haidar Khan
Sibsagar	Emran Husain Choudhury
Sylhet Sadar (North)	Ibrahim Ali
Karimganj (West)	M. Idris Ali
Sunamganj (West)	Md. Mafiz Choudhury
Silchar	Makabbir Ali Mazumdar
South Sylhet (West)	Mayeenuddin Ahamed Choudhury
Dhubri (North)	Md. Mased Ali
Habiganj (South-West)	Mudabbir Hussain Choudhuri
Karimganj (South)	Md. Mufazzal Hussin
Sunamganj (Central)	Munawwar Ali
Habiganj (South-West)	Nasir-ud-Din Ahmed
Goalpara (West)	Md. Nazmal Haque
Habiganj (South-West)	Nurul Hussain Khan
Nowgong (West)	Muhammad Roufique
Kamrup (South)	Muhammad Saadulla
Lakhimpur	Sayidur Rahman
Sylhet Sadar (West)	Dewan Taimur Raza Choudhury
European Planting	J. C. Horwood
European Commerce and Industry	E. S. Kaye
European Planting	E. W. B. Kenny
European Planting	G. Kydd
European Planting	H. A. Munro
European Planting	R. A. Palmer
European Planting	W. D. Rutherfurd
European Planting	C. G. Terrell
European	A. Whittaker
Women's (Shillong)	Bonely Khongmen
Biswanath (Labour, Darrang District)	Binode Kumar J. Sarwan
Nazira (Labour, Sibsagar District)	Chanoo Kheria
Tinsukia (Labour, Lakhimpur District)	Dalbir Singh Lohar
Kamrup (Tribal, Plains)	Dharanidhar Basumatari
Nowgong (Tribal, Plains)	Dhirsingh Deuri
Srimangal (South Sylhet)	Jiban Santal Labou
Backward Areas (Hills)	J. J. M. Nichols Roy
Lakhimpur and Majuli (Tribal, Plains)	Karka Doley Miri
Mikir Hills (Backward Areas, Hills)	Khorsing Terang
Jowai (Backward Areas, Hills)	Larsingh Khyrien
Garo Hills (South, Backward Areas, Hills)	Mody Marak
Garo Hills (South, Backward Areas, Hills)	Moniram Marak
Indian Christian	P. M. Sarwan
Goalpara (Tribal, Plains)	Rupnath Brahma
