= List of Assam ministries =

This is a list of the state cabinets of Assam from the time of the British Raj to the present day.

== List ==
No.	Name	Formed	Ended	Election	Party	System	Ref.
1	Saadulah I	1937	1938	1937	AVP	Parliamentary	
2	Bordoloi I	1938	1939	1937	INC	Parliamentary	
3	Saadulah II	1939	1941	1937	AVP	Parliamentary	
4	Saadulah III	1942	1946	1937	AVP	Parliamentary	
5	Bordoloi II	1946	1950	1946	INC	Parliamentary	
6	Bordoloi III	1950	1950		INC	Parliamentary	
7	Medhi I	1950	1952		INC	Parliamentary	
8	Medhi II	1952	1957	1952	INC	Parliamentary	
9	Medhi III	1957	1957	1957	INC	Parliamentary	
10	Chaliha I	1957	1962	1957	INC	Parliamentary	
11	Chaliha II	1962	1967	1962	INC	Parliamentary	
12	Chaliha III	1967	1970	1967	INC	Parliamentary	
13	Choudhry	1970	1972	1967	INC	Parliamentary	
14	Sinha	1972	1978	1972	INC	Parliamentary	
15	Borbora	1978	1979	1978	JP	Parliamentary	
16	Hazarika	1979	1979	1978	JP	Parliamentary	
17	Taimur	1980	1981	1978	INC	Parliamentary	
18	Keshab	1982	1982	1978	INC	Parliamentary	
19	Saikia I	1983	1985	1983	INC	Parliamentary	
20	Mahanta I	1985	1990	1985	AGP	Parliamentary	
21	Saikia II	1991	1996	1991	INC	Parliamentary	
22	Barman	1996	1996	1991	INC	Parliamentary	
23	Mahanta II	1996	2001	1996	AGP	Parliamentary	
24	Tarun I	2001	2006	2001	INC	Parliamentary	
25	Tarun II	2006	2011	2006	INC	Parliamentary	
26	Tarun III	2011	2016	2011	INC	Parliamentary	
27	Sonowal	2016	2021	2016	BJP	Parliamentary	
28	Sarma I	2021	2026	2021	BJP	Parliamentary	
29	Sarma II	2026	-	2026	BJP	Parliamentary	

== See also ==
- Chief Minister of Assam
