= Bordoloi ministry (Assam) =

1950 cabinet in the Indian state of Assam

- 6th Cabinet of Assam
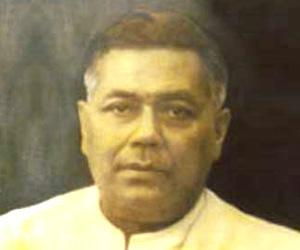
- Date formed: 26 January 1950
- Date dissolved: 5 August 1950

People and organisations
- Governor: Sri Prakasa; Jairamdas Daulatram
- Chief Minister: Gopinath Bordoloi
- Member parties: INC

History
- Predecessor: Bordoloi II (Note: (provincial government))
- Successor: Medhi I

The Bordoloi ministry was the Cabinet of Assam headed by Chief Minister of Assam Gopinath Bordoloi formed following the adoption of the Constitution of India. The Ministry lasted from 26 January 1950 until the death of Bordoloi on 5 August 1950.

== History ==
The ministry was formed following the adoption of the Constitution of India on 26 January.

== Ministers ==
=== Cabinet ===
Name	Party
Gopinath Bordoloi Chief Minister	INC
Cabinet Ministers
Bishnuram Medhi	INC
Abdul Muhib Mazumder	INC
James Joy Mohan Nichols Roy	INC
Ram Nath Das	INC
Omeo Kumar Das	INC
Rupnath Brahma	INC
