= Bordoloi ministry =

Bordoloi ministry may refer to these cabinets of Assam, India headed by Gopinath Bordoloi as chief minister:

- First Bordoloi ministry (Assam Province) (1938–1939)
- Second Bordoloi ministry (Assam Province) (1946–1950)
- Bordoloi ministry (Assam) (1950)
