= Bhimbor Deori =

Indian tribal leader belonging to the Deori tribe (1903-1947)

Janneta Bhimbor Deori
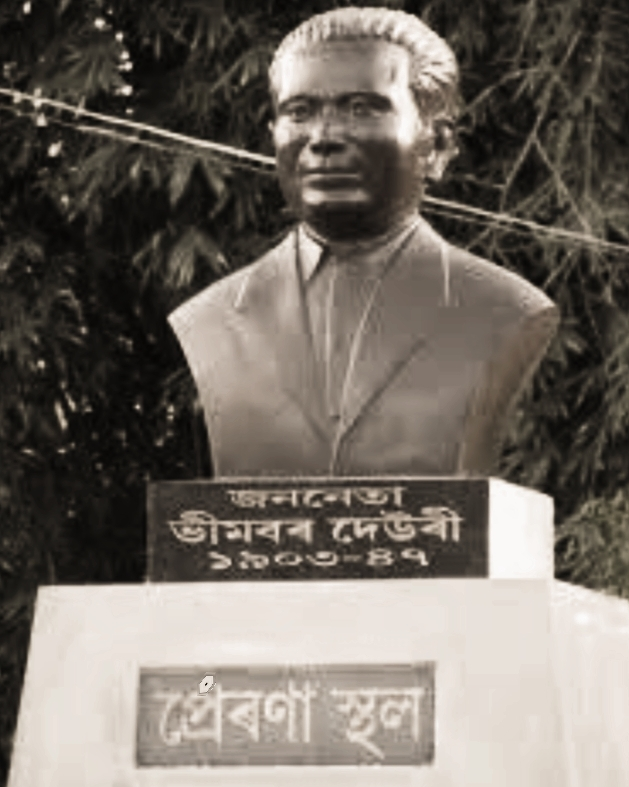

Cabinet Minister ,Assam
- In office 8 July 1946 – 12 April 1947
- Prime Minister: Gopinath Bordoloi
- Departments: Forests; Labour
- Preceded by: Munawwar Ali (Forests); Surendranath Buragohain (Labour)
- Succeeded by: Rupnath Brahma (Forests); Omeo Kumar Das (Labour)

Member, Assam Legislative Council
- In office 1939–1947
- Preceded by: ?
- Succeeded by: Post Abolished
- Constituency: Nominated

Personal details
- Party: Independent

Bhimbor Deori (Assamese: ভীমবৰ দেওৰী;16 May 1903 – 30 November 1947) was an Indian tribal leader,lawyer,politician belonging to the Deori tribe from the state of Assam.

Deori was one of the main architects of the “Khasi Darbar Hall Resolutions” created on 21–23 March 1945. In these resolutions, indigenous leaders of different ethnic identities resolved to restore their independent homelands against what they termed Indian occupation. His father's name is Godaram Deori and his mother's name is Bajoti Deori

Deori helped found the General Secretary of Assam Backward Plains Tribal League in 1933. He stated that the government was not justified in stopping the remission of land revenue. He worked to ensure that indigenous Assamese people be allotted land pattas. While criticizing improper mass literacy campaigns during the Assam Legislative Council budget session on 9 to 13 March 1943. With his team effort Assam province was included in Republic of India. By refusing British viceroy's plan to include in to the Pakistan.

In 1946,after the 1946 Indian provincial elections,he was appointed Minister for Forests and Labour in the pre-independence Assam Cabinet on July 8, 1946, serving under Premier Gopinath Bordoloi's Second Bordoloi ministry (Assam Province). However, his ministerial tenure was tragically cut short due to failing health he resigned in 12 April 1947. He died on November 30, 1947, at the age of 44, just months after securing independence.
