= Mushahary =

Mushahary is a Boro surname. Notable people with the surname include:

- Banendra Mushahary, Indian politician
- Rajendra Mushahary, Indian politician
- Bhaskar Mushahary, Indian civil servant, IAS 1980 Batch
- Ruprekha Mushahary, entrepreneur, social worker, poet, writer, blogger and expert in Assamese and Bodo cuisine
- Sonali Mushahary, media person
