= Second Medhi ministry =

1952 cabinet in the Indian state of Assam

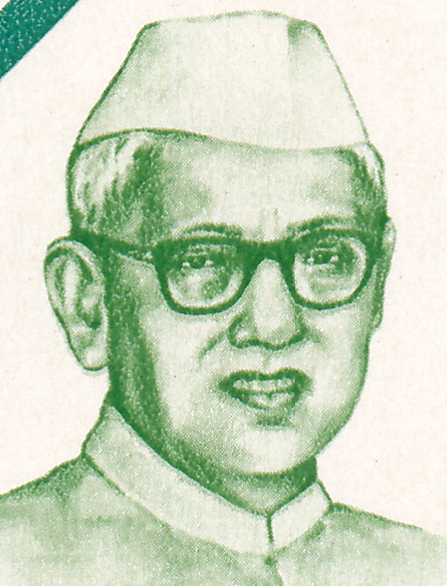
- Date formed: 1952
- Date dissolved: 21 April 1957

People and organisations
- Governor: Jairamdas Daulatram; Fazl Ali
- Chief Minister: Bishnuram Medhi
- Member parties: INC

History
- Election: 1952
- Outgoing election: 1957
- Predecessor: Medhi I
- Successor: Medhi III

The Second Medhi ministry was the Cabinet of Assam headed by Chief Minister of Assam Bishnuram Medhi. The Ministry lasted from 1952 to 21 April 1957.

== Ministers (July 1956) ==
Name	Portfolios	Constituency	Party
Bishnuram Medhi Chief Minister	Appointment; Home; Confidential; Tribal Areas; Development (Community Projects) (National Extension Service); Welfare and Development of Tribes living in Plains and Hills; Coordination of five-year plan; Development of the state; Election; Social Welfare Organisation; Coordination of all departments	Hajo	INC
Cabinet Ministers
Motiram Bora	Finance; Revenue; Relief and rehabilitation; Mines and minerals; Distribution of land; Land reforms	Marigaon Dhing	INC
Siddhinath Sarmah	Public Works; Embankment and drainage; Flood protective measures (irrigation and transport); Nationalisation of transport; Cooperative and rural developments	Rangiya	INC
Omeo Kumar Das	Labour and labour welfare; Education; Development of backward areas; Welfare of backward classes; Publicity	Dhekiajuli North	INC
Baidyanath Mookerjee	Supply; Procurement and consumer goods; Textile; Housing; General administration; Planning and development; Trade and commerce; Major industries; Judicial	Ratabari Patharkandi	INC
Rupnath Brahma	Medical department; Public health; Cottage industries; Sericulture and weaving	Kokrajhar Sidli	INC
Ramnath Das	Printing and stationery; Secretariat administration; Forest; Legislative (excluding election); Electricity; Agriculture; Food; Land reclamation	Jorhat North	INC
James Joy Mohan Nichols Roy	Excise; Jails; Registration and stamps	Shillong	INC
Abdul Muhib Mazumder	Local Self-Governance; Veterinary; Livestock	Hailakandi	INC
Deputy Ministers
Hareswar Das	Revenue; Relief; Rehabilitation	North Salmara	INC
Purnananda Chetia	Labour and labour welfare; Education	Sonari	INC
Mohikanta Das	Parliamentary affairs; Community development projects; Community national extension blocks; Veterinary; Local self-government	Barchalla	INC
Joybhadra Hagjer	Public works department; Transport; Cooperative		
