= First Chaliha ministry =

Cabinet of Assam, India (1957–1962)

- Date formed: 27 December 1957
- Date dissolved: 1 March 1962

People and organisations
- Governor: Saiyid Fazl Ali (until 22 Aug 1959); Chandreswar Prasad Sinha (23 Aug–14 Oct 1959); S. M. Shrinagesh (14 Oct 1959 – 12 Nov 1960); Vishnu Sahay (12 Nov 1960 – 13 Jan 1961); Vishnu Sahay (13 Jan 1961 – 7 Sep 1962)
- Chief Minister: Bimala Prasad Chaliha
- Member parties: Indian National Congress

History
- Election: 1957
- Outgoing election: 1962
- Predecessor: Third Medhi ministry
- Successor: Second Chaliha ministry

The First Chaliha ministry was the state ministry of Assam headed by Chief Minister Bimala Prasad Chaliha of the Indian National Congress from 27 December 1957 and served until the 1962 Assembly election. Bimala Prasad Chaliha replaced chief minister Bishnuram Medhi on 27 December 1957 to become the state's third chief minister.

The ministry remained in office until the party's re-election in 1962 and after the formation of the government for a second term under the leadership of chief minister Bimala Prasad Chaliha.

== Composition ==
The ministry was formed on 27 December 1957 and sworn in into office by Governor Saiyid Fazl Ali. It consisted of Chief Minister Bimala Prasad Chaliha, eight cabinet ministers and three deputy ministers. The cabinet ministers included Fakhruddin Ali Ahmed, Debeswar Sarmah, Rupnath Brahma, Kamakhya Prasad Tripathi, Hareswar Das, Mahendra Nath Hazarika, Moinul Hoque Choudhury, and Williamson A. Sangma; while the deputy ministers were Girindra Nath Gogoi, Biswadev Sarma, and Larsingh Khyriem. Four others were appointed as parliamentary secretaries, which included A. Thanglura, Pu Lalmawia, Lalit Kumar Doley, and Sai Sai Terang.

Of among the ministers, Fakhruddin Ali Ahmed and Moinul Hoque Choudhury would later go on to become cabinet ministers in the union government under prime minister Indira Gandhi. Fakhruddin Ali Ahmed would later become the 5th President of India in 1974. Another minister, Williamson A. Sangma later served as the inaugural Chief Minister of Meghalaya in 1972.

== Ministers ==
=== Cabinet Ministers ===
Portfolio	Minister	Took office	Left office	Party	Constituency
Chief Minister and also in-charge of: Department of Appointments; Department of Political; Department of General Administration; Department of Secretariat Administration; Department of Relief and Rehabilitation; Minority Commission; Department of Co-operation; And all other departments and subjects not allocated to any other minister.	Bimala Prasad Chaliha	28 December 1957	1 March 1962	INC	Badarpur
Minister of Finance; Minister of Community Projects and National Extension Service Blocks; Minister of Local Self Government; Minister of Judicial and Legislative	Fakhruddin Ali Ahmed	28 December 1957	1 March 1962	INC	Jania
Minister of Public Works Development (Roads and Buildings); Minister of Jails; Minister of Education	Debeswar Sarmah	28 December 1957	1 March 1962	INC	Jorhat
Minister of Medical and Public Health; Minister of Printing and Stationery; Minister of Registration and Stamps	Rupnath Brahma	28 December 1957	1 March 1962	INC	Kokrajhar
Minister of Planning and Development; Minister of Statistics; Minister of Labour; Minister of Town and Country Planning; Minister of Industries; Minister of Power (Electricity); Minister of Trade and Commerce	Kamakhya Prasad Tripathi	28 December 1957	1 March 1962	INC	Biswanath
Minister of Revenue; Minister of Forests; Minister of Excise	Hareswar Das	28 December 1957	1 March 1962	INC	North Salmara
Minister of Rural Development (Panchayats); Minister of Sericulture and Weaving; Minister of Khadi and Village Industries Boards	Mahendra Nath Hazarika	28 December 1957	1 March 1962	INC	Nowgong
Minister of Agriculture; Minister of Pisciculture; Minister of Veterinary and Livestock; Minister of Supply (Consumer Goods and Textile); Minister of Parliamentary Affairs; Minister of Flood Control and Irrigation; Minister of Co-operatives	Moinul Hoque Choudhury	28 December 1957	1 March 1962	INC	Silchar East
Minister of Tribal Areas; Minister of Publicity and Information; Minister of Transport	Williamson A. Sangma	28 December 1957	1 March 1962	INC	Phulbari

=== Deputy Ministers ===
Portfolio	Minister	Took office	Left office	Party	Constituency
Deputy Minister in the Department of Public Works Department (Roads and Buildings); Deputy Minister in the Department of Local Self-Government	Girindra Nath Gogoi	28 December 1957	1 March 1962	INC	Sibsagar
Deputy Minister in the Department of Co-operatives; Deputy Minister in the Department of Labour; Deputy Minister in the Department of Political Sufferers	Biswadev Sarma	28 December 1957	1 March 1962	INC	Balipara
Deputy Minister in the Department of Agriculture; Deputy Minister in the Department of Cottage and Village Industries	Larsingh Khyriem	28 December 1957	1 March 1962	INC	Jowai

=== Parliamentary Secretaries ===
Portfolio	Minister	Took office	Left office	Party	Constituency
Parliamentary Secretary in the Department of Community Projects; Parliamentary Secretary in the Department of Transport	A. Thanglura	28 December 1957	1 March 1962	INC	Aijal West
Parliamentary Secretary in the Department of Tribal Areas; Parliamentary Secretary in the Department of Printing and Stationery; Parliamentary Secretary in the Department of Publicity and Information	Pu. Lalmawia	28 December 1957	1 March 1962	INC	Aijal East
Parliamentary Secretary in the Department of Forests; Parliamentary Secretary in the Department of Tribal Areas; Parliamentary Secretary in the Department of Social Welfare	Lalit Kumar Doley	28 December 1957	1 March 1962	INC	Moran
Parliamentary Secretary in the Department of Relief and Rehabilitation	Sai Sai Terang	28 December 1957	1 March 1962	INC	Mikir Hills East
