= Second Bordoloi ministry (Assam Province) =

1946 cabinet in the Indian state of Assam

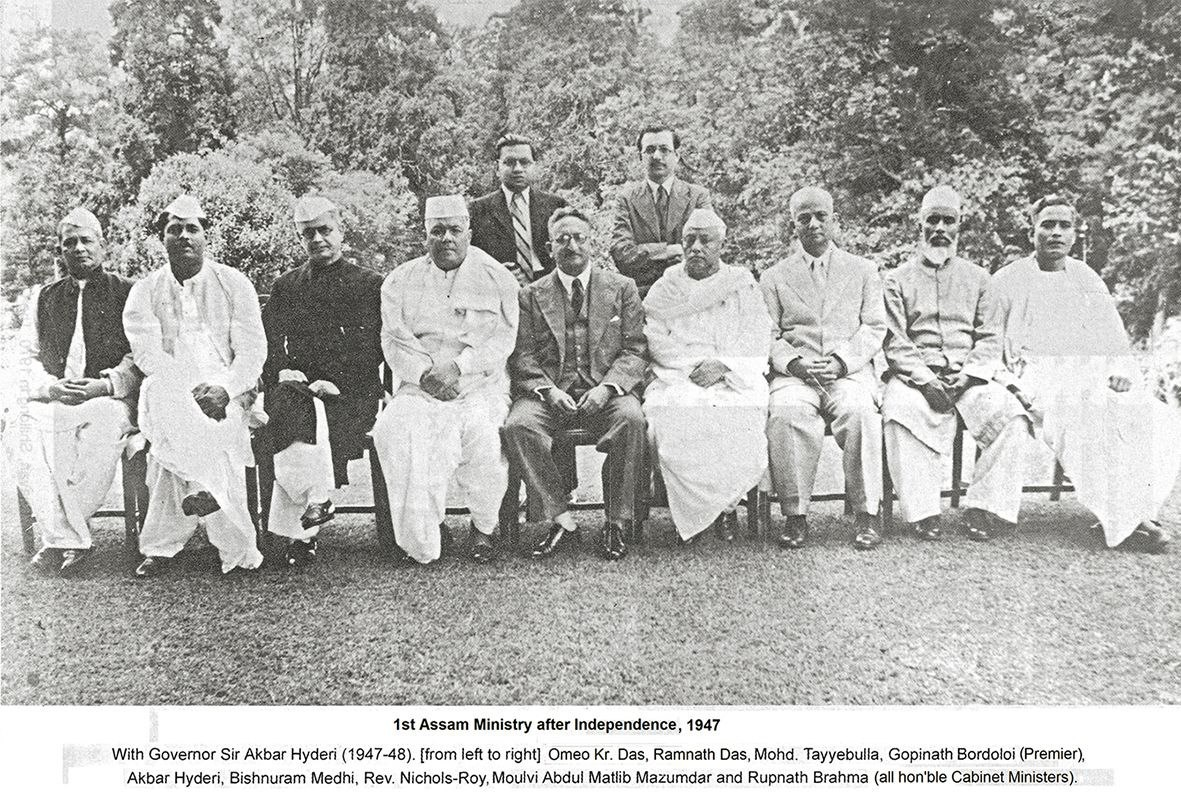
- Date formed: 11 February 1946
- Date dissolved: 25 January 1950

People and organisations
- Governor: Andrew Clow; Frederick Chalmers Bourne; Henry Foley Knight; Andrew Clow; Muhammad Saleh Akbar Hydari; Ronald Lodge
- Prime Minister: Gopinath Bordoloi
- Member parties: INC

History
- Election: 1946
- Predecessor: Saadulah III
- Successor: Bordoloi ministry

The Second Bordoloi provincial government, was the Cabinet of Assam province headed by Prime Minister of Assam Gopinath Bordoloi. The Ministry lasted from 11 February 1946 until 25 January 1950, when the Bordoloi ministry was formed.

== History and changes ==
Muhammed Saadulah resigned on 10 February 1946 following the 1946 elections. Abdul Kalam Azad had held discussions with Saadulah to explore the possibility of forming a ministry of the Indian National Congress with the All-India Muslim League but Saadulah rejected the proposal.

The Bordoloi government assumed office on 11 February 1946, and originally consisted of six members. Bhimbor Deori, a nominated member of Assam Legislative Council, and Abdur Rasheed were appointed ministers on 23 September 1946. Deori resigned on 12 April 1947 on health grounds, and on the same day his father-in-law, Rupanath Brahma inherited his portfolios.

A new cabinet was formed following the independence of India. Basanta Kumar Das, Baidyanath Mookherjee and Abdur Rasheed were dropped from the previous ministry as Sylhet had decided to join Pakistan.

On 9 May 1949, Muhammad Tayabulla was appointed a minister but he resigned on 21 January 1950.

== Ministers (1946) ==
=== Cabinet ===
Name	Portfolios	Party
Gopinath Bordoloi Chief Minister	Appointment; Education; Transport; Publicity; Legislative	INC
Cabinet Ministers
Basanta Kumar Das	Home; Judicial; Legislative; Registration; General Departments	INC
Bishnuram Medhi	Finance; Revenue	INC
Abdul Matlib Mazumder	Agriculture; Local self-government; Veterinary	INC
Baidyanath Mookherjee	Supply; Reconstruction; Mechanically propelled vehicles; Jail departments	INC
James Joy Mohan Nichols Roy	Public Works Department	INC
Ram Nath Das	Public Health; Medical; Excise	INC
Bhimbor Deori	Labour; Forest	INC
Abdur Rasheed	Industries; Cooperative departments; Muslim education	INC
Parliamentary Secretary to the Chief Minister
Purnananda Chetia		INC

== Ministers (1947) ==
=== Cabinet ===
Name	Portfolios	Party
Gopinath Bordoloi Chief Minister	Home; Education; Transport; Industries; Cooperation	INC
Cabinet Ministers
Bishnuram Medhi	Finance; Revenue; Legislative	INC
James Joy Mohan Nichols Roy	Public Works Department	INC
Ram Nath Das	Public Health; Medical; Electricity	INC
Rupnath Brahma	Forest; Judicial; Registration	INC
Omeo Kumar Das	Food; Supply; Labour	INC
Md. Tayyebulla	Excise; Publicity; Jails	INC
Abdul Muhib Mazumder	Local self-government; Agriculture; Veterinary	INC
