= Third Medhi ministry =

1957 cabinet in the Indian state of Assam

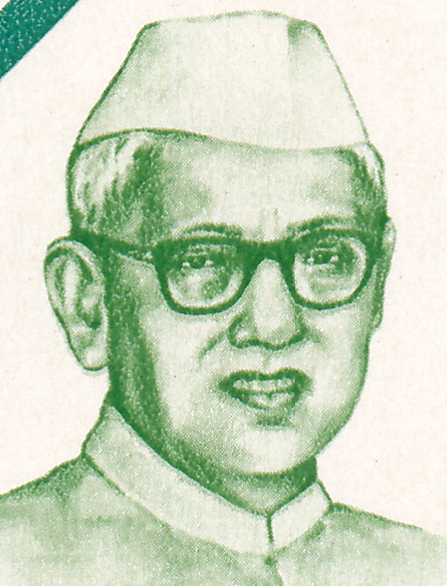
- Date formed: 22 April 1957
- Date dissolved: 27 December 1957

People and organisations
- Governor: Fazl Ali
- Chief Minister: Bishnuram Medhi
- Member parties: INC
- Opposition party: PSP

History
- Election: 1957
- Predecessor: Medhi II
- Successor: Chaliha I

The Third Medhi ministry was the Cabinet of Assam headed by Chief Minister of Assam Bishnuram Medhi. The Ministry lasted from 22 April 1957 to 27 December 1957.

== History ==
On 22 April, the new cabinet was sworn in at Raj Bhavan in Shillong. It originally consisted of nine ministers (including Medhi) and seven deputy ministers. The four newcomers to the cabinet were Debeswar Sarma, K. P. Tripathi, Moinul Huq Chaudhury, and Chatra Singh Teron.

Medhi appointed Usha Barthakur, marking the first time a woman served in an Assam ministry since 23 March 1957. However, Barthakur would leave office following Medhi's resignation on 27 December 1957.

== Ministers ==
Name	Portfolios	Constituency	Party
Bishnuram Medhi Chief Minister	General administration; Appointments; Tribal areas; Social Welfare; Community Projects	Hajo	INC
Cabinet Ministers
Debeswar Sarmah	Finance; Supply	Jorhat	INC
Motiram Bora	Home; Education	Laharighat	INC
Siddhinath Sarmah	Public Works; Transport; Rural development; Local self-government	Rangiya	INC
K. P. Tripathi	Labour and labour welfare; Development and planning; Major industries; Electricity; Cottage industries; Sericulture; Weaving	Biswanath	INC
Hareswar Das	Revenue; Relief and rehabilitation; Settlement of Town lands	North Salmara	INC
Rupnath Brahma	Forests; Medical and public health; Judicial; Legislative; Printing and stationery	Kokrajar	INC
Moinul Huq Chaudhury	Food and agriculture; Veterinary; Pisciculture; Cooperation department	Silchar East	INC
Chatra Singh Teron	Excise; Prohibition; Jail; Registration; Stamps; Tribal Welfare; Development of Backward Areas	Mikir Hills West	INC
Deputy Ministers
Purnananda Chetia	Local self-governance; Education	Sonari	INC
Mohikanta Das	Community projects; Veterinary; Livestock	Barchalla	INC
Indreswar Khaund	Cooperative; Cottage industries; Sericulture; Weaving; Transport	Bogdung	INC
Usha Barthakur	Social Welfare; Rural development; Maternity; Child welfare	Samaguri	INC
Girindra Nath Gogoi	Revenue; Relief; Rehabilitation	Sibsagar	INC
Ghanashyam Das	Medical; Public Health; Forest	North Salmara	INC
Mahendra Nath Hazarika	Khadi and village industries board; Cottage industries	Nowgong	INC
