= Sonabarighat =

Coordinates: 24.756°N 92.834°E

Sonabarighat is a town in Sonai, Cachar district, in Assam, India. The birthplace of the late Moinul Hoque Choudhury is situated at the tri-junction of the Aizawl-Sonai-Silchar road.

Bengali and Meitei (Manipuri) are the official languages of this place.

The town has a primary health center in the market, along with a government higher secondary school.
