= Pushpalata Das =

Member of Parliament, Rajya Sabha
- In office 1951–1961
- Constituency: Assam

Member of Assam Legislative Assembly
- In office 1967–1972
- Preceded by: Omeo Kumar Das
- Succeeded by: Hiranya Bora
- Constituency: Dhekiajuli

Personal details
- Born: 27 March 1915 North Lakhimpur, Assam, India
- Died: 9 November 2003 (aged 88) Kolkata, West Bengal, India
- Spouse: Omeo Kumar Das (m. 1942; died 1975)
- Children: 1
- Parents: Rameswar Saikia; Swarnalata
- Awards: Padma Bhushan; Tamrapatra Freedom Fighter Award

Pushpalata Das (1915–2003) was an Indian independence activist, social worker, Gandhian and legislator from the north-east Indian state of Assam. She was a member of Rajya Sabha from 1951 to 1961, a member of the Assam Legislative Assembly and of the working committee of the Indian National Congress. She served as the chairperson of the Assam chapters of the Kasturba Gandhi National Memorial Trust and Khadi and Village Industries Commission. The Government of India awarded her the country's third highest civilian honour, the Padma Bhushan, in 1999, for her contributions to society.

== Early life ==
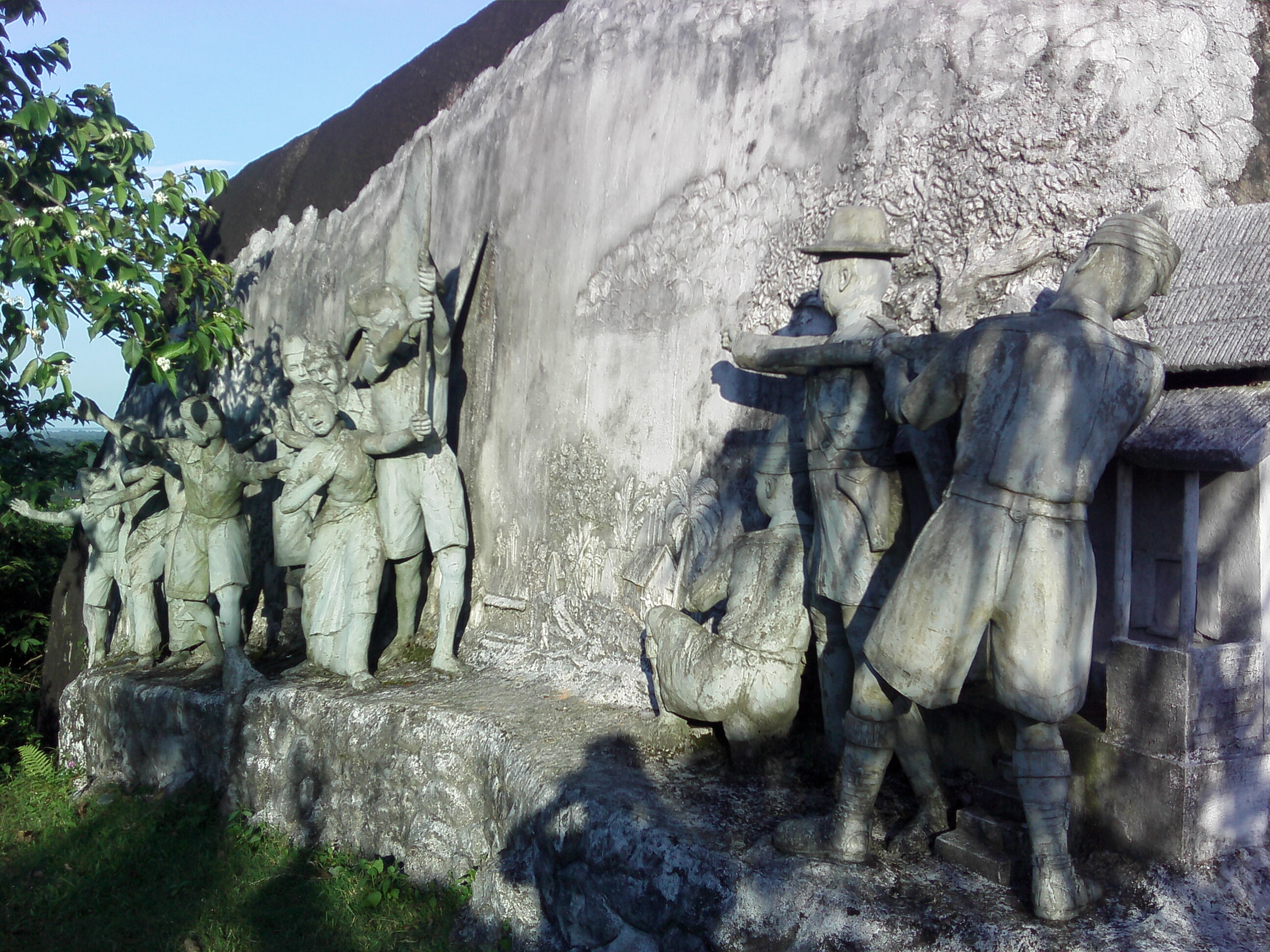
A sculpture at Kanaklata Udyan showing the police shooting of 1942

Born on 27 March 1915 to Rameswar Saikia and Swarnalata in North Lakhimpur in Assam, Das did her schooling at Panbazar Girls High School. She started her political activities from school days and was the secretary of an organization by name, Mukti Sangha. In 1931, she and her comrades organized a protest against the hanging of the revolutionary, Bhagat Singh by the British Raj and was expelled from school.

She continued her studies as a private student and passed the matriculation examination in 1934, after which she joined Benaras Hindu University to complete her intermediate course. Later, she graduated from Andhra University and secured post-graduate degree from the same university in 1938. Subsequently, she enrolled herself for studies in law at Earle Law College, Guwahati where continued her student politics; she was the secretary of the college union in 1940. It was during this time, Gandhiji called for Individual Satyagraha, as a part of civil disobedience movement and as a precursor to the Quit India Movement which would be launched two years later, and Das participated in the movement. She was incarcerated which effectively cut short her law studies.

== Political life ==
Due to her association with the National Planning Committee as a member of its Women Sub Committee, Das moved to Mumbai that year and stayed there for two years. Her activities gave her opportunities to work alongside Mridula Sarabhai and Vijaya Laxmi Pandit as well as Omeo Kumar Das, then sitting member of the Assam Legislative Assembly, whom she married in 1942. She returned to Assam after her marriage and formed two organizations, Shanti Bahini and Mrityu Bahini.

In September 1942, Das and her comrades of Mrityu Bahini led a protest to the local police station holding the National Flag of India and it was at this procession, the police opened fire which led to the death of her colleague, Kanaklata Barua. By that time, she had already become a member of the All India Congress Committee and the convener of the women's wing of the Assam Congress Committee and reportedly worked to get Assam out of the grouping with East Pakistan.

After the Indian independence in 1947, Das couple focused their activities in Dhekiajuli in Assam which Omeo Kumar Das represented in Assam Legistalive Assembly for successive terms from 1951 to 1967. Pushpalata Das herself was nominated to the Rajya Sabha in 1951 and held the position 1961. It was during this period she led the 1957 election campaign of Chandraprava Saikiani from Bajali constituency. Later, she was elected to the Congress Working Committee in 1958 and the next year, she visited a number of East European countries as a member of the parliamentary delegation. In 1967, she contested from Dhekiajuli when her husband vacated the constituency, winning the election representing Indian National Congress After the death of her husband on 23 January 1975, Das withdrew from parliamentary politics, concentrating for more social service. She served as the chairperson of the Assam chapter of the All India Khadi Board and chaired the state boards of Bhudan and Gramdan initiatives. She was also associated with the Central Social Welfare Board and served as a member of the women's section of the Congress Planning Committee and the East India wing of the Censor Board of India. She edited the Assamese magazine, Jayanti and headed the Assam branch of the Kasturba Gandhi National Memorial Trust for a certain period of time. She also published one book, Rajarama Sukla rashtriyaatma varcasva evam krtitva, san 1898-1962, released in 1976.

== Award and honours ==
The Government of India honored her with Tamrapatra Freedom Fighter Award but she declined it saying she participated in the Indian freedom struggle without expecting returns. In 1999, the government awarded her the third highest civilian honor of the Padma Bhushan. Towards the later days of her life, she suffered from age-related illnesses and had to be moved to a Woodlands Nursing Home in Kolkata, where she died on 9 November 2003, at the age of 88, survived by her daughter, Nandini and her husband, Sasanka Dutta.

== See also ==
- Mridula Sarabhai
