= James Joy Mohan Nichols Roy =

Christian minister and politician in Meghalaya, India (1884–1959)

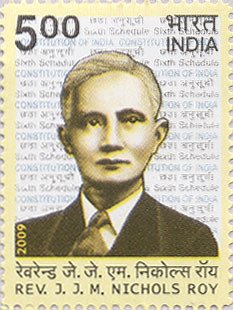
- 2009 commemorative stamp

Minister for Excise, Jails, Registration and stamps
- In office 1952 – 22 April 1957
- Chief Minister: Bishnuram Medhi
- Preceded by: himself
- Succeeded by: Rupnath Brahma; Chatra Singh Teron

Minister for Medical, Health, Excise and Jails
- In office 9 August 1950 – 1952
- Chief Minister: Bishnuram Medhi
- Preceded by: Ram Nath Das
- Succeeded by: Rupnath Brahma

Minister for the Public Works Department
- In office 11 February 1946 – 5 August 1950
- Prime Minister: Gopinath Bordoloi
- Preceded by: Sayidur Rahman
- Succeeded by: Ram Nath Das

Minister for Local self-government and Medicine (Note: Local Self-government and excise from 1 April 1937 to 4 February 1938)
- In office 1 April 1937 – 18 September 1938
- Prime Minister: Muhammed Saadulah
- Preceded by: Office established
- Succeeded by: Kamini Kumar Sen

Member of Assam Legislative Assembly
- In office 1957 – 1962
- Constituency: Cherrapunji
- In office 1937 – 1957
- Constituency: Shillong

Personal details
- Born: 12 June 1884 Mawsyiarwait, Shella confederacy, Meghalaya, India
- Died: 1 November 1959 (aged 75)
- Party: Indian National Congress
- Other political affiliations: Independent; Progressive Party
- Spouse: Evelyn Nichols-Roy
- Occupation: Christian minister, politician

James Joy Mohan Nichols Roy (12 June 1884 – 1 November 1959) was an Indian Christian minister and politician from what is now the state of Meghalaya. Before the independence of India he agitated for autonomy of the tribal peoples of northeast India. After independence this was enshrined in the Sixth Schedule of the Constitution of India through his efforts.

== Early years ==
James Joy Mohan Nichols Roy was born on 12 June 1884 at Mawsyiarwait, Shella confederacy, now in the East Khasi Hills district of Meghalaya, India. His father was U Khan Than Roy, a manual day laborer from Khapmaw in what was then Shillong State. His great uncle was U Tirot Singh of Nongkhlaw Syiemship. He attended Lba High School, but his education was disrupted by the 1897 Assam earthquake. His house was not badly damaged, but his parents chose to move to Jasir for greater safety.

Nichols Roy adopted the Christian faith in 1898, a year after the earthquake. He joined the Church of God, a Christian denomination that originated in the United States, and later became a leading member. Nichols Roy was admitted to Shillong government High School in 1899. He went to university in Kolkata, and earned a B.A. in 1904.

Rev. Nichols Roy founded the United Fruit Company in 1918, a joint stock cooperative for tribal people. Activities included planting orange trees, selling fruit juice, processing orange squash, operating a motor transport company and an indigenous bank, and importing essential goods from the plains to the hill people.

== Pre-independence politics ==
In 1921 Nichols Roy was appointed to the Assam Governor's Council as the first representative of tribal people. As a member of the Governor's Council he initiated acts against consuming opium, smoking tobacco and drinking alcoholic and other intoxicating drinks. He was one of the founders of the Assam Christian Council (today NEICC) in 1937.

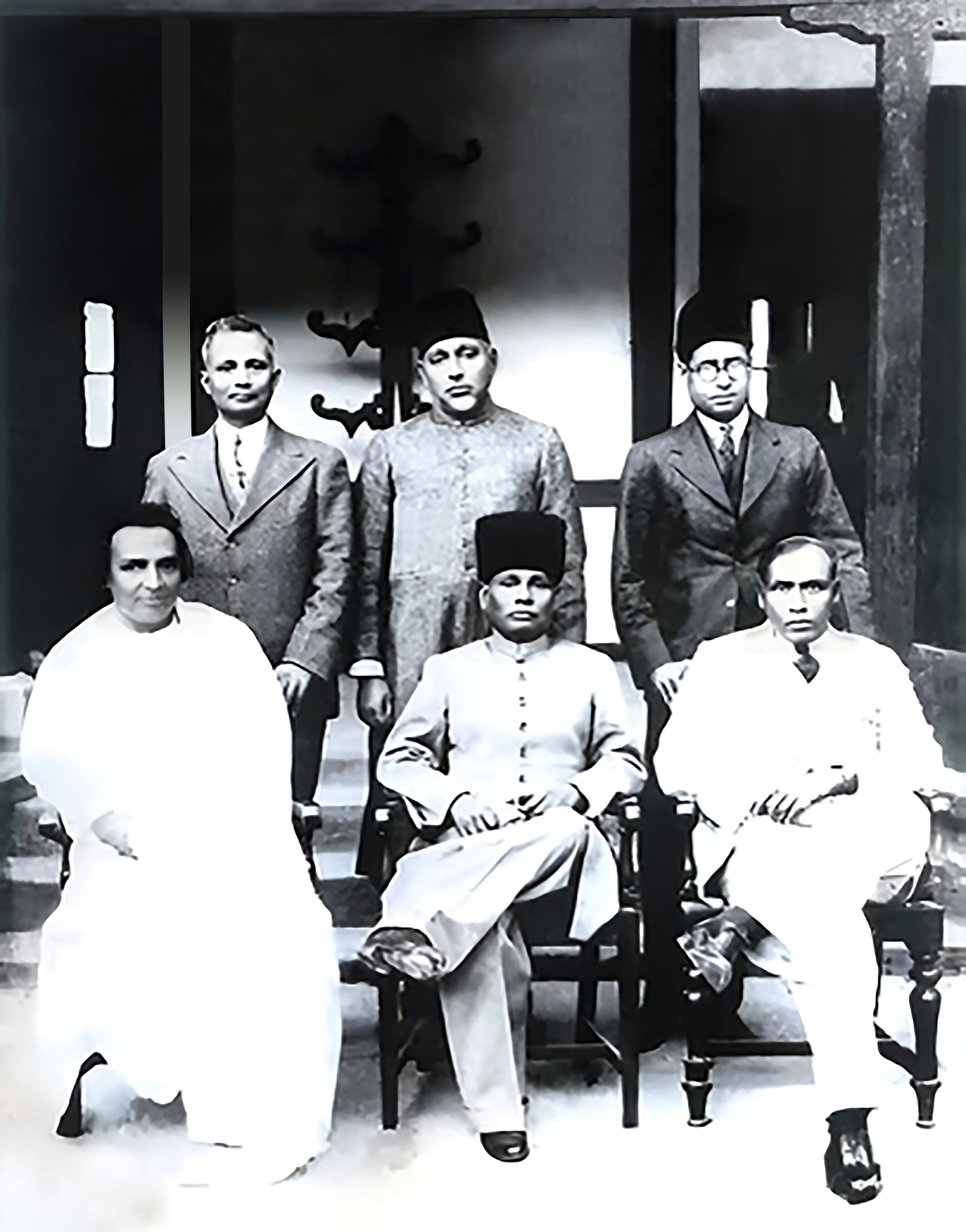
After swearing-in of 2nd coalition Saadulah ministry, February 1938, Standing (l to r) Nichols Roy, Muhammed Saadulah, Abdul Matin Chaudhury. Seated (l to r) Rohini Kumar Chaudhuri, Munawar Ali, Akshay Kumar Das

Nichols Roy was elected to the Assam Legislative Assembly in 1937. He was a minister in the Assam coalition cabinets of 1 April 1937 – 4 February 1938 and 5 February 1938 – 18 September 1938. Despite serving under Muhammed Saadulah in these two ministries, Nichols Roy was opposed to the efforts by the Muslim League to make Assam part of Pakistan. He was more naturally aligned with the Congress Party. He was again a minister in the Congress cabinet of 11 February 1946 – 14 August 1947.

When the political structure of independent India was being discussed, the British were inclined to keep the tribal people of the Excluded and Partially Excluded areas separate from the plainspeople, but Indians such as Rohini Kumar Chaudhuri wanted them to be part of a unified state of Assam so they could be assimilated into the plains culture. The leaders of the hill people disagreed, and wanted to retain separation from the non-tribal people. Nichols Roy, leader of the Khasi people, was the most prominent member of the educated elite, pushing for autonomy of the hill districts of Assam at time of independence.

Nichols Roy influenced Jawaharlal Nehru to create the Khasi Jaintia National Federation State Conference (KJFSC), a regional party in Meghalaya's Khasi-Jaintia hills, which aimed for autonomous government among tribal people throughout northeast India. Nichols Roy's Khasi National Conference communicated with similar organizations such as the Garo National Conference, Mizo Union and Naga National Council. In response, the constitutional plan defined District Councils to look after tribal affairs in the hill districts, to which the chiefs would be subordinate.

== Constituent Assembly ==
Nichols Roy was elected as a Congress Party member for Assam in the Constituent Assembly, where he stood up for tribal rights and autonomy. Nichols Roy made important contributions to the Constituent Assembly, and was one of a handful of Hill Tribe leaders to become national figures. He was largely responsible for the Sixth Schedule of the Constitution of India. This schedule provides for tribal areas in Assam, Meghalaya, Tripura and Mizoram to be administered as autonomous districts or regions. Nichols Roy and Gopinath Bordoloi asserted that the schedule would prevent alienation, promote development and protect tribal populations from exploitation. Laws passed by the special governments in the schedule areas would usually require the governor's assent, so the Union would remain in control.

K.M. Munshi proposed that the constitution should state, "Any conversion from one religion to another of any person brought about by fraud, coercion or undue influence or of a minor under the age of 18 shall not be recognised by law." Speaking against this proposal, Nichols Roy said,

When a boy feels that he is called by God to adopt a different faith, no law should prevent him from doing that. The conscience of those youths who want to change their religion and adopt another religion from a spiritual standpoint should not be prevented from allowing these youths to exercise their right to change their legal status and change their religion... I myself was converted when I was about fifteen years old when I heard the voice of God calling me. I was ready to lose anything on earth. I was ready to suffer death even. I did not care for anything save to obey and follow the voice of God in my soul. Why should a youth who has such a call of God be prevented by law from changing his religion and calling himself by another name when he feels before God that he is influenced by the spirit of God to do that and is ready even to sacrifice his life for that? This part of the amendment about minors is absolutely wrong when we consider it from the spiritual standpoint. From the standpoint of conscience I consider that it is altogether wrong not to allow a youth from the age of twelve to eighteen to exercise his own conscience before God. It will oppress the consciences of the youths who want to exercise their religious faiths before God.

== Post-independence ==
Nichols Roy was a member of the Bordoloi government of Assam after independence, but became alienated from the Congress party due to its dominance by middle class Assamese. He turned to supporting the Hill State Movement, with its goal of forming a separate state of Khasi, Jaintia and Garo peoples. Nichols Roy died on 1 November 1959. The Government of India issued a 500 Paise commemorative stamp in his honor on 12 June 2009.

== Publications ==
- J. J. M Nichols Roy (1937), Speech on the spirit of Christ
- J. J. M Nichols Roy (1958), Speech on Christianity : at the Ramkrishna Centenary Meeting
- J. J. M Nichols Roy (1979), Ka jingkha thymmai ka mynsiem (in Khasi)
- J. J. M Nichols Roy (1982), Ki jingrwai shem mynsiem (in Khasi)
- James Joy Mohan Nichols Roy (1997), O. L. Snaitang (ed.), Memoirs of Life and Political Writings of the Hon'ble Rev. J.J.M. Nichols-Roy, Contributor: M. M. Jacob, Shrolenson Marbaniang

== See also ==
- Hill tribes of Northeast India

== Sources ==
- "J.J.M. Nichols Roy", Constitution of India, Centre for Law & Policy Research, archived from the original on 6 October 2021
- J.J.M. Nichols Roy, Khasi Hills Autonomous District Council
- Kumar, Nikhlesh (May–August 2005), "Identity Politics in the Hill Tribal Communities in the North-Eastern India", Sociological Bulletin, 54 (2), Indian Sociological Society: 195–217, doi:10.1177/0038022920050203, JSTOR 23620497, S2CID 147920779
- M. Afzal Wani (April–December 2000), "Freedom of Conscience: Constitutional Foundations and Limits", Journal of the Indian Law Institute, 42 (2/4, Constitutional Law Special Issue), Indian Law Institute: 289–313, JSTOR 43953816
- Pritam Baruah; Nicolas M. Rouleau (2011), "Democracy, Representation, and Self-Rule in the Indian Constitution", Verfassung und Recht in Übersee / Law and Politics in Africa, Asia and Latin America, 44 (2), Nomos Verlagsgesellschaft mbH: 177–195, JSTOR 43239606
- Profile 3: Rev.J.J.M. Nichols Roy, Church of God Meghalaya & Assam, 17 November 2017
- "Rev. J. J. M. Nichols-Roy", iStampGallery.com, 12 June 2009
- Shibani Kinkar Chaube (Autumn 1975), "Interethnic Politics in Northeast India", International Review of Modern Sociology, 5 (2): 193–200, JSTOR 41421530
- Shibly, Atful Hye (2011), Abdul Matin Chaudhury (1895–1948): Trusted Lieutenant of Mohammad Ali Jinnah, Juned Ahmed Choudhury, ISBN 9789843323231, OCLC 708358349
- Udayon Misra (2017). Burden of History: Assam and the Partition—Unresolved Issues. Oxford University Press. ISBN 978-0-19-909157-7.
