= Second Chaliha ministry =

1962 cabinet in the Indian state of Assam

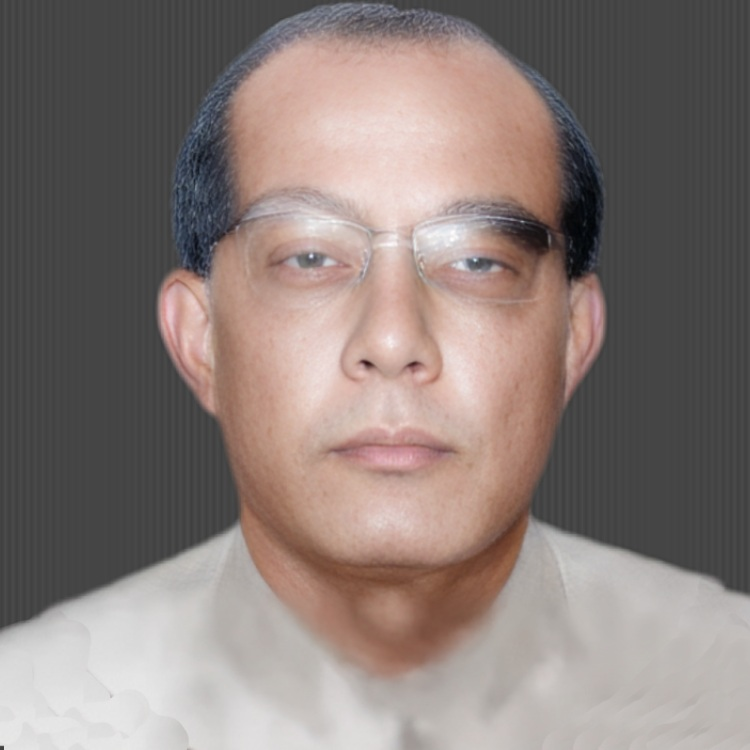
- Date formed: 22 March 1962
- Date dissolved: 16 March 1967

People and organisations
- Governor: S. M. Shrinagesh; Vishnu Sahay
- Chief Minister: Bimala Prasad Chaliha
- Member parties: INC
- Opposition party: AHL

History
- Election: 1962
- Outgoing election: 1967
- Predecessor: Chaliha I
- Successor: Chaliha III

The Second Chaliha ministry was the Cabinet of Assam headed by Chief Minister of Assam Bimala Prasad Chaliha. The Ministry lasted from 22 March 1962 to 1967.

== History ==
Komol Kumari Barua was appointed a Minister of State on 23 April 1966, becoming the third female Assamese minister.

== Ministers ==
Portfolio	Minister	Took office	Left office	Party	Constituency
Chief Minister and also in-charge of: Department of Appointments; Department of Home; Department of Political; General Administration Department; Secretariat Administration Department; Department of Information and Publicity; Department of Minority Affairs; Department of Public Works (Roads and Buildings); All other departments not allocated to any other minister.	Bimala Prasad Chaliha	1 March 1962	16 March 1967	INC	Sonari
Minister of Finance; Minister of Law; Minister of Panchayats; Minister of Community Projects; Minister of Wakf Property	Fakhruddin Ali Ahmed	1 March 1962	2 April 1966	INC	Jania
Minister of Power (Electricity); Minister of Industries (including Cottage Industries); Minister of Planning and Development; Minister of Town and Country Planning; Minister of Labour; Minister of Statistics	Kamakhya Prasad Tripathi	1 March 1962	16 March 1967	INC	Biswanath
Minister of Revenue; Minister of Transport; Minister of Forests; Minister of Political Sufferers	Siddhinath Sarma	1 March 1962	16 March 1967	INC	Rangiya
Minister of Education; Minister of Co-operation; Minister of Tourism	D. K. Barooah	1 March 1962	16 March 1967	INC	Samaguri
Minister of Health; Minister of Excise; Minister of Printing and Stationery	Baidyanath Mookerjee	1 March 1962	16 March 1967	INC	Ratabari
Minister of Agriculture; Minister of Pisciculture; Minister of Veterinary and Livestock; Minister of Flood Control and Irrigation; Minister of Parliamentary Affairs	Moinul Hoque Choudhury	1 March 1962	16 March 1967	INC	Silchar East
Minister of Supply; Minister of Trade and Commerce; Minister of Registration and Stamps; Minister of Relief and Rehabilitation	Rupnath Brahma	1 March 1962	16 March 1967	INC	Sidli
Minister of Khadi and Village Industries; Minister of Sericulture and Weaving; Minister of Jails	Mahendra Nath Hazarika	1 March 1962	16 March 1967	INC	Raha
Minister of Tribal Areas; Minister of Welfare of Backward Classes; Minister of Municipal Administration; Minister of Social Welfare	Chatrasing Teron	1 March 1962	16 March 1967	INC	Mikir Hills West

=== Ministers of State ===
Portfolio	Minister	Took office	Left office	Party	Constituency
Minister of State for Public Works (Roads and Buildings)	Girindra Nath Gogoi	1 March 1962	16 March 1967	INC	Sibsagar
Minister of State for Revenue	Radhika Ram Das	1 March 1962	16 March 1967	INC	Palasbari
Minister of State for Community Projects; Minister of State for Tribal Areas; Minister of State for Welfare of Backward Classes; Minister of State for Power (Electricity)	Emonsingh Sangma	1 March 1962	16 March 1967	INC	Phulbari

=== Deputy Ministers ===
Portfolio	Minister	Took office	Left office	Party	Constituency
Deputy Minister of Tribal Areas; Deputy Minister of Welfare of Backward Classes; Deputy Minister of Cooperatives; Deputy Minister of Forests	Lalit Kumar Doley	1 March 1962	16 March 1967	INC	Dhakuakhana
Deputy Minister of Education; Deputy Minister of Social Welfare	Komol Kumari Barua	23 April 1966	16 March 1967	INC	Katonigaon
Deputy Minister of Panchayats; Deputy Minister of Community Projects	Devendra Nath Hazarika	1 March 1962	16 March 1967	INC	Saikhowa

=== Parliamentary Secretary ===
Portfolio	Minister	Took office	Left office	Party	Constituency
Parliamentary Secretary for Relief and Rehabilitation	Sai Sai Terang	1 March 1962	16 March 1967	INC	Mikir Hills East
