= First Medhi ministry =

1950 cabinet in the Indian state of Assam

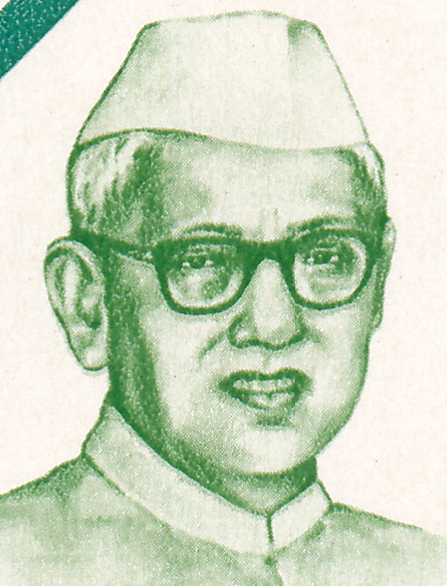
- Date formed: 9 August 1950
- Date dissolved: 1952

People and organisations
- Governor: Jairamdas Daulatram
- Chief Minister: Bishnuram Medhi
- Member parties: INC

History
- Outgoing election: 1952
- Predecessor: Bordoloi
- Successor: Medhi II

The First Medhi ministry was the Cabinet of Assam headed by Chief Minister of Assam Bishnuram Medhi. The Ministry lasted from 9 August 1950 to 1952.

== Composition ==
The Ministry consisted of 8 cabinet ministers (including chief minister) and two deputy ministers.

== Ministers ==
=== Cabinet ===
| Name | Portfolios | Constituency | Party |
|---|---|---|---|
| Bishnuram Medhi Chief Minister | Appointment; Home; Transport; Publicity; Legislative | Hajo | INC |
Cabinet Ministers
| James Joy Mohan Nichols Roy | Medical; Health; Excise; Jails | Shillong | INC |
| Ramnath Das | Public works department | Jorhat North | INC |
| Rupnath Brahma | Forest; Judicial; Registration; General | Kokrajhar Sidli | INC |
| Abdul Muhib Mazumder | Local self-government; Veterinary | Hailakandi | INC |
| Omeo Kumar Das | Labour; Agriculture; Education; Welfare of backward tribes | Dhekiajuli North | INC |
| Motiram Bora | Finance; Revenue; Relief and rehabilitation | Marigaon Dhing | INC |
| Mahendra Mohan Choudhury | Procurement; Supply; Textile; Cooperative; Rural development; Village industries; Publicity | Barpeta | INC |

=== Deputy ministers ===
Deputy Ministers
| Hareswar Das | North Salmara | INC |
| Purnananda Chetia | Sonari | INC |
