= Omeo Kumar Das Institute of Social Change and Development =

Indian research institute

- অমিয় কুমাৰ দাস সামাজিক পৰিৱৰ্তন আৰু উন্নয়ন প্ৰতিষ্ঠান
- Type: Education and Research institute
- Established: 1989 (37 years ago)
- Parent institution: Indian Council of Social Science Research
- Director: Saswati Choudhury
- Location: Tripura Road, Jayanagar, Beltola, Guwahati, Assam, India; 26.12120°N 91.80523°E
- Campus: Urban
- Acronym: OKDISCD
- Website: okd.in

Omeo Kumar Das Institute of Social Change and Development is an autonomous Institute situated in Guwahati, Assam. It was established in 1989 under the joint initiative of Government of Assam and Indian Council of Social Science Research (ICSSR), New Delhi. It promotes and coordinates research on problems and processes of social transformation and development of Assam and other States of the North Eastern region of India.

== History ==
Formerly the instruction was known as the Institute for Social Change and Development, the Government of Assam renamed it after the first Education Minister of Assam, Omeo Kumar Das in 1995 as a mark of respect towards him on his birth centenary. The Chief Minister of Assam, Sri Tarun Gogoi, laid the foundation stone of the Institute on 13 April 2005 and inaugurated the building on 20 February 2009.

== Programmes ==
- PhD Programme
- Post Graduate Certificate Course on North East India Studies
- Research Methodology Course
- Computer Application Course
- Ph.D. Fellowship Programme
- Visiting Fellows Programme
- Training programmes
- Data Consultancy
- Lectures Seminars and Workshops
