= Assam Legislative Council =

Legislature of Assam, India (1913–1947(

- Assam

Type
- Type: Upper house
- Term limits: 6 years

History
- Established: 1935
- Disbanded: 1947
- Seats: 21 – 22

Elections
- Voting system: Proportional representation, First past the post and Nominations

The Assam Legislative Council was the unicameral legislature of Assam in India from 1913 to 1935 and then the upper house of the bicameral legislature from 1935 to 1947, when it was disbanded by the India (Provincial Legislatures) Order, 1947, and the Assam Legislative Assembly became unicameral.

In July 2013 the Legislative Assembly passed a bill to recreate the Legislative Council.

== List of MLCs (1935–1947) ==
List of Members of Assam Legislative Council
Portrait	MLC	Party	Term
	Manick Chandra Barooah	Assam Association	1908-1915
	Rai Bahadur Bhuban Ram Das	Assam Association	1910-1912
	Rai Bahadur Ghanashyam Barua	Assam Association	
	Kuladhar Chaliha	Indian National Congress	1923-1929
	Pramathesh Barua	Swaraj Party	
	Padmanath Gohain Baruah	Ahom Association	1913-?
Choudhury seated from left corner	Rohini Kumar Chaudhuri	Hindu People's Party	
	Bhimbor Deori	Tribal League	1939-1947
	Kamala Prasad Agarwala	Indian National Congress	1940-1947
	Prabhat Chandra Barua		
	Jogesh Chandra Borgohain	Indian National Congress	1930s
	Basanta Kumar Das	Indian National Congress	1926–1930
	Moulvi Muhammad Amiruddin	Indian National Congress	
	Maulavi Faiznur Ali	Indian National Congress	1924-1929
	Khan Bahadur Ghulam Mustafa Chaudhury	All-India Muslim League	
	Rai Bahadur Dulal Chandra Deb		1906-1912
	Zubaida Ataur Rahman		
	Syed Abdul Majid		1921-?
