= Purnananda Chetia =

Indian politician

Member of Parliament, Rajya Sabha
- In office 3 April 1964 – 2 April 1970
- Constituency: Assam
Ministerial offices
Deputy Minister for Local self-governance and Education
In office 22 April 1957 – 27 December 1957
Chief Minister	Bishnuram Medhi
Preceded by	Mohikanta Das (local self-governance)
Succeeded by	Girindra Nath Gogoi
Deputy Minister for Labour, Labour welfare and Education
In office 9 August 1950 – 21 April 1957
Chief Minister	Bishnuram Medhi
Preceded by	Office established
Succeeded by	himself (education)
Parliamentary Secretary to the Chief Minister
In office 11 February 1946 – 15 August 1947
Chief Minister	Gopinath Bordoloi

Member of Assam Legislative Assembly
- In office 1951 – 1962
- Preceded by: Constituency established
- Succeeded by: Bimala Prasad Chaliha
- Constituency: Sonari
- In office 1946 – 1947

Personal details
- Born: 22 February 1907
- Died: Unknown
- Party: Indian National Congress
- Spouse: Annadabala Devi
- Children: 4
- Parent: Ramakanta Chetia (father)
- Education: Cotton College
- Profession: Politician

Purnananda Chetia (22 February 1907 – unknown) was an Indian politician from Assam who served as a Member of the Rajya Sabha from 1964 to 1970.

== Life and family ==
Purnananda Chetia was born on 22 February 1907, (Note: Some sources note his year of birth as 1905.) the son of Ramakanta Chetia. He was educated at Sibsagar Government English High School, and earned a Bachelor of Arts from Cotton College.

He was married to Annadabala Chetia and they had three sons and one daughter together.

== Career ==
Chetia became a Member of Assam Legislative Assembly in 1946. In 1951, he was elected to the assembly for the constituency of Sonari. He served as a minister in the Government of Assam in 1951, and from 1952 to 1957.

Chetia was elected to the Rajya Sabha in 1964, and served until 1970.

== See also ==
- List of Rajya Sabha members from Assam
