= Dalbir Singh Lohar =

Indian freedom fighter

Dalbir Singh Lohar was an Indian freedom fighter and political leader from Assam. He played a significant role in the Indian independence movement and holds the distinction of being the first Gorkha to win an assembly election in independent India.

== Early life and involvement in freedom struggle ==
Dalbir Singh Lohar actively participated in the Indian freedom struggle under the guidance of the Indian National Congress. He was deeply inspired by Mahatma Gandhi's philosophy of non-violence and truth. During Gandhi's visit to Assam in 1921, Lohar joined the Congress-led procession in Dibrugarh and became involved in the Satyagraha movement initiated by Gandhi.

In 1941, during the third phase of the Satyagraha campaign, he was expelled from Assam due to his active involvement in the struggle.

== Role as a labor leader ==
After India's independence, Dalbir Singh Lohar emerged as a popular labour leader. He closely worked with the Assam Provincial Congress and the Indian National Trade Union Congress (INTUC). From 1964 to 1968, he served as the central president of the Assam Chah Mazdoor Sangha (Assam Tea Workers Union).

== Political career ==
Lohar's political career began after India gained independence. He became the first Gorkha to win an assembly election in independent India, representing the interests of the working class and the Gorkha community in Assam.

== Legacy ==
Dalbir Singh Lohar's contributions to the freedom struggle and labour rights movement have been widely recognised. The Assam government has instituted the "Freedom Fighter Dalbir Singh Lohar Excellence Award" in his honour.

On the occasion of his 53rd death anniversary, a special program was presented by Doordarshan Kendra (DDK) Dibrugarh to commemorate his life and legacy.

== See also ==
Indian Independence Movement

Gorkha Community in India

Assam Tea Workers Movement
