= Second Mahanta ministry =

Cabinet of Assam, India from 1996 to 2001

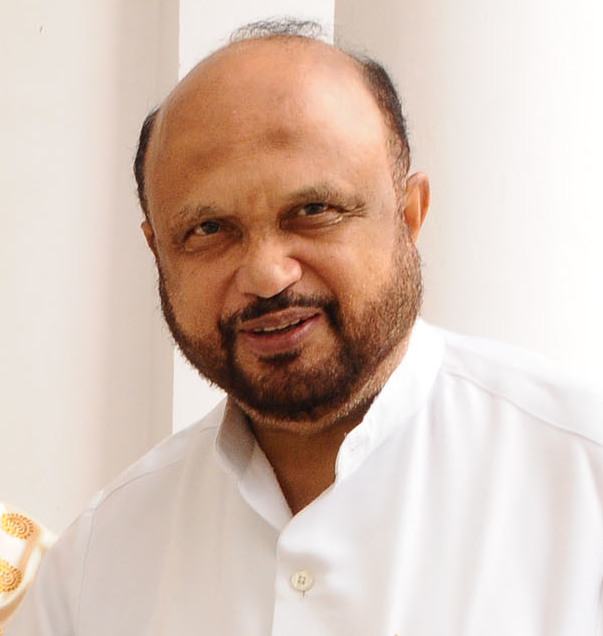
- Date formed: 15 May 1996
- Date dissolved: 17 May 2001

People and organisations
- Head of state: Lokanath Misra; Srinivas Kumar Sinha
- Head of government: Prafulla Kumar Mahanta
- Member parties: AGP; CPI; IND
- Opposition party: Indian National Congress

History
- Election: 1996
- Outgoing election: 2001
- Legislature term: 5 years
- Predecessor: Barman Ministry
- Successor: Tarun Gogoi I

The Second Ministry of Prafulla Kumar Mahanta was the Cabinet of Assam headed by Chief Minister of Assam Prafulla Kumar Mahanta that was formed after the 1996 Assam Legislative Assembly election. The results of the election were announced on 22 April 1996 and this led to the formation of the 10th Assam Legislative Assembly. Mahanta, along with his council of ministers, was sworn in as Chief Minister on 15 May 1996.

== Ministers ==
| Name | Constituency | Portfolio | Party |
|---|---|---|---|
| Prafulla Kumar Mahanta Chief Minister | Barhampur | Home; Finance; General Administration; Any departments not allocated to others | AGP |
Cabinet Ministers
| Atul Bora | Dispur | Public Works | AGP |
| Nagen Sarma | Nalbari | Forest | AGP |
| Pradip Hazarika | Amguri | Transport | AGP |
| Sahidul Alam Choudhury | Algapur | Panchayat; Rural development | AGP |
| Digen Bora | Batadroba | Food and Civil supplies | AGP |
| Thaneswar Bora | Rangiya | Higher Education | AGP |
| Promode Gogoi | Sibasagar | Flood control | CPI |
| Jatin Mali | Palasbari | Elementary Education | AGP |
| Abdul Muhib Mazumder | Hailakandi | Irrigation | IND |
| Phani Bhusan Choudhury | Bongaigaon | Labour and Employment | AGP |
| Biraj Kumar Sarma | Gauhati East | Municipal Administration | AGP |
| Surendra Nath Medhi | Bhabanipur | Veterinary | AGP |
| Zoii Nath Sarmah | Sipajhar | Revenue | AGP |
| Chandra Mohan Patowary | Dharmapur | Agriculture | AGP |
| Gunin Hazarika | Kaliabor | Industry | AGP |
| Kamala Kanta Kalita | Chaygaon | Health | AGP |
| Rekha Rani Das Boro | Barama | Social Welfare | AGP |
Ministers of State
| Utpal Dutta | Lakhimpur | Social Welfare; Mines; Minerals | AGP |
| Ramendra Narayan Kalita | Gauhati West | Sericulture | AGP |
| Abdul Rouf | Jania | Science; Technology | UMF |
| Akon Rabha | Dudhnai | Soil Conservation | AGP |
| Abdul Jabbar | Dalgaon | Char areas development; Wakf Board | AGP |
| Hiranya Konwar | Mahmara | Veterinary; Animal Husbandry | AGP |
| Bulbul Das | Jagiroad | Fisheries | AGP |
| Rajendra Mushahary | Gossaigaon | Plains tribes | AGP |
| Bhaben Baruah | Chabua | Health; Family welfare | AGP |
| Joseph Toppo | Dhekiajuli | Labour; Employment | AGP |
