= Barman ministry =

1996 cabinet in the Indian state of Assam

- 21th Cabinet of Assam
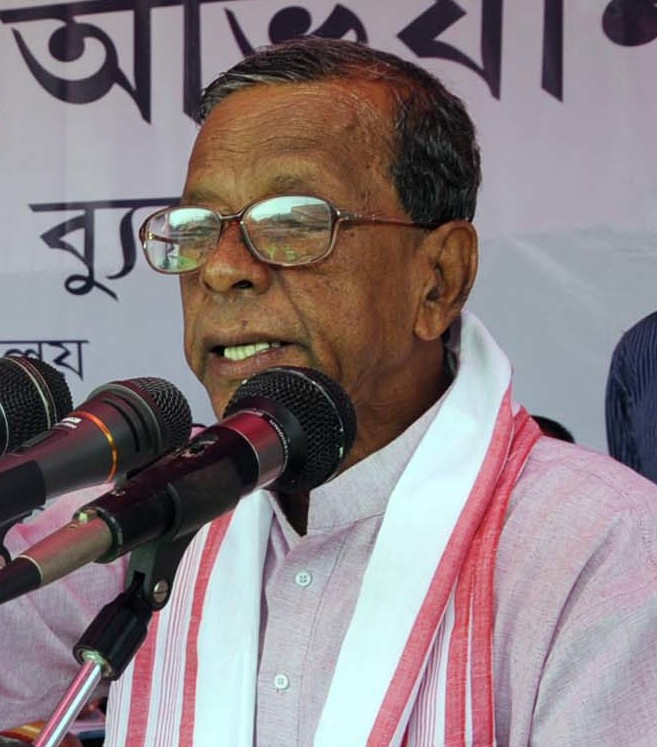
- Date formed: 22 April 1996
- Date dissolved: 14 May 1996

People and organisations
- Governor: Lokanath Misra
- Chief Minister: Bhumidhar Barman
- Member parties: INC
- Opposition party: Asom Gana Parishad

History
- Outgoing election: 1996
- Legislature term: 5 years
- Predecessor: Saikia II
- Successor: Mahanta II

The Barman Ministry was the Cabinet of Assam headed by Chief Minister of Assam Bhumidhar Barman that was formed following the death of Chief Minister Hiteswar Saikia. The ministry had 11 Cabinet ministers along with 3 ministers of state. The ministry was dissolved following the 1996 Assam Legislative Assembly election, which resulted in the formation of the Second Mahanta Ministry. Barman was the shortest serving Chief Minister of Assam, with a tenure of 22 days.

== History ==
On 22 April 1996, incumbent Chief Minister Hiteswar Saikia died at the age of 61. Saikia had been Chief Minister since the 1991 election, in which Congress gained a clear majority in the Assam Legislative Assembly by winning 65 out of the 125 seats. Saikia had been campaigning for the 1996 election days before his death, despite doctors insisting he take rest. Saikia's tenure as Chief Minister was marked by allegations of corruption and nepotism, and four motions of no confidence had been filed against the cabinet which all were negated. Saikia's unexpected death had a great impact, with the AGP Leader Prafulla Kumar Mahanta stating that "Saikia leaves a great void" and that Saikia "had the state under a spell." The uncertainty following his death stemmed largely from the ongoing violence and division within the state at the time.

Hours after Saikia's death, the Congress leadership chose then Health Minister Bhumidhar Barman as the new caretaker Chief Minister. This followed the contingency plan created by Prime Minister P. V. Narasimha Rao, who had been in Assam after the deterioration in Saikia's death. Rao lent his plane to Saikia for his treatment in New Delhi, delaying his return and then spending the night in Guwahati talking to members of his party in the event of Saikia's death. Barman's appointment was seen as for continuity as the Congress did not have a leader that was able to match the stature of Saikia. It was considered difficult for Rao to find a long-term replacement for Saikia as neither of his Union Ministers Santosh Mohan Dev and Matang Sinh were regarded as suitable for the position. Due to the limited options, Rao settled on Barman as Chief Minister. Barman's political image at the time was dominated by his survival of 3 assassination attempts by the UFLA, despite most his ministerial career under Saikia being overshadowed by Saikia. However, there were other potential candidates considered for Saikia's position, including senior congressman such as Golok Rajbanshi, Jiba Kanta Gogoi, Hiranya Bora, Tarun Gogoi and Saikia's widow Hemoprova Saikia.

Barman was sworn in as Chief Minister on 22 April 1996. Appointments to his cabinet included the former Chief Minister Anwara Taimur.

In the 1996 Assam Legislative Assembly election, held on 27 April 1996, the AGP-ASDC, CPI, CPI (M), and UPP alliance secured an absolute majority in the assembly with AGP winning 58 seats and Congress winning 34. Days before Saikia had died, he admitted that he feared about the prospects of Congress. The Congress defeat was attributed largely due to the AGP resurgence, voting desertions and the tenure and loss of Hiteswar Saikia. Senior congressman Golok Rajbanshi claimed that "Saikia and his sycophants finished off the party." Among the congress MLAs who were defeated in the election were the incumbent Chief Minister Barman along with former Chief Minister Anwara Taimur. Mahanta went onto form his second ministry and was sworn in as Chief Minister on 15 May.

== Ministers ==
Name	Constituency	Party
Bhumidhar Barman Chief Minister	Barkhetry	INC
Cabinet Ministers
Anwara Taimur	Dalgaon	INC
Mukut Sarma	Nowgong	INC
Gobinda Chandra Langthasa	Haflong	INC
Zahirul Islam	Mankachar	INC
Bijit Saikia	Tezpur	INC
Dileswar Tanti	Doom Dooma	INC
Ardhendu Kumar Dey	Hojai	INC
Silvius Condpan	Majbat	INC
Nagen Neog	Golgahat	INC
Devanand Konwar	Thowra	INC
Dinesh Prasad Goala	Lakhipur	INC
Ministers of State
Sarat Barkotoky	Sonari	INC
Nurul Hussain	Samaguri	INC
Goneswar Pegu	Jonai	INC
