= Third Saadulah ministry =

1942 cabinet in the Indian province of Assam

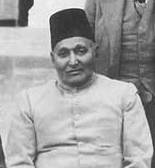
- Date formed: 25 August 1942
- Date dissolved: 11 February 1946

People and organisations
- Governor: Andrew Clow
- Prime Minister: Muhammed Saadulah
- Member parties: Assam Valley Party; All-India Muslim League

History
- Predecessor: Governor's Rule
- Successor: Bordoloi II

The Third Saadulah provincial government was the Cabinet of Assam Province headed by Prime Minister of Assam Muhammed Saadulah. The first cabinet was an All-India Muslim League government from 25 August 1942 to 23 March 1945, and then a coalition cabinet from 23 March 1945 to 11 February 1946.

== History ==
Section 93 was revoked on 25 August 1942 (revoking Governor's Rule), and the third ministry of Saadulah was sworn-in by Governor Andrew Clow. Following the resignation of Agriculture minister Naba Kumar Dutta, Saadulah announced on 22 March 1945 that the whole ministry would resign and be reshuffled.

== Ministers ==
=== First Cabinet ===
From 25 August 1942 to 23 March 1945.

Name	Portfolios	Party
Muhammed Saadulah Chief Minister	Home; Transport; Supplies	Muslim league
Cabinet Ministers
Munawwar Ali	Revenue; Forest	Muslim league
Muddabbir Hussain Chaudhuri	Civil Defence; Legislative	Muslim league
Sayidur Rahman	Education; Public Works Department	Muslim league
Abdul Matin Chaudhury	Finance	Muslim league
Hirendra Chandra Chakrbatti	Local self-government; Excise; Labour	Assam United Party
Mavis Dunn	Medical; Public Health	Assam United Party
Mahendra Nath Saikia	Industries; Cooperative	Assam United Party
Rupnath Brahma	General; Judicial; Registration	Assam United Party
Naba Kumar Dutta	Agriculture; Veterinary	Assam United Party

== Ministers ==
=== Second Cabinet ===
From 23 March 1945 to 11 February 1946.

Name	Portfolios
Muhammed Saadulah Chief Minister	Home department; Supplies; Publicity
Cabinet Ministers
Munawwar Ali	Forest; General department
Baidya Nath Mukherji	Finance; Registration; Mechanically Propelled Vehicles
Rohini Kumar Chaudhuri	Revenue; Judicial; Legislative
Muddabbir Hussain Chaudhuri	Medical; Public health
Surendra Nath Burhagohain	Excise; Local self-government; Labour
Sayidur Rahman	Jails
Akshay Kumar Das	Industries; Cooperation
Abdul Matin Chaudhury	Public Works Department; Construction
Rupnath Brahma	Agriculture; Veterinary
