= Moulvi Muhammad Amiruddin =

Indian politician

Moulvi Muhammad Amiruddin Mukhtar

Deputy Speaker of the Assam Legislative Assembly
- In office 7 April 1937 – 2 March 1946

Personal details
- Born: Kalikajhari, Mikirbeta, Morigaon district, Assam

Moulvi Muhammad Amiruddin was an Indian politician from Assam. He was the first Deputy Speaker of the Assam Legislative Assembly from 7 April 1937 to 2 March 1946.

He is from Kalikajari, a small village in Morigaon. He was active in the freedom struggle and went to prison many times.

He was elected from the then Nowgong Mohammedan East constituency as an independent candidate. He took a stand against Muslim League and reportedly supported the then premier Gopinath Bordoloi, who prevented a ploy to merge Assam with Pakistan.

In 2018, many of his close family members, including his grand nephew Rafikul Islam, were termed as 'foreigners' by the Foreigners’ Tribunal in Assam as part of the National Register of Citizens.
