= D. Basumatari =

Indian politician

Dharanidhor Basumatari

Member of Parliament, Lok Sabha
- In office 1957-1977
- Succeeded by: Charan Narzary
- Constituency: Kokrajhar, Assam

Personal details
- Born: 1914 Dalaigaon, Goalpara district, Assam, British India
- Party: Indian National Congress
- Spouse: Narmada Basumatari
- Children: 4 sons

Dharanidhor Basumatari was an Indian politician. He was elected to the Lok Sabha, lower house of the Parliament of India, from the Kokrajhar constituency in Assam in 1957, 1962, 1967 and 1971 as a member of the Indian National Congress. He was a member of the Constituent Assembly of India.
