= Rupnath Brahma =

Bodo poet, politician and religious scholar (1902–1968)

Member of Parliament, Lok Sabha
- In office 4 March 1967 – March 1971
- Preceded by: D. Basumatari
- Succeeded by: D. Basumatari
- Constituency: Kokrajhar
Ministerial offices
Minister for Supply, Trade, Commerce, Registration, Stamps, Relief and Rehabilitation
In office 22 March 1962 – 1967
| Chief Minister | Bimala Prasad Chaliha |
| Preceded by | Moinul Hoque Choudhury |
| Succeeded by | Satindra Mohon Dev |
Minister for the Medical department, Public Health, Cottage industries, Sericulture and weaving (Note: Medical and Public Health, Printing, Stationery, Registration and Stamps from 1957 to 1962. Forests, Medical and public health, Judicial, Legislative, Printing and stationery from April to December 1957)
In office 1952 – 21 March 1962
| Chief Ministers | Bishnuram Medhi; Bimala Prasad Chaliha |
| Preceded by | James Joy Mohan Nichols Roy |
| Succeeded by | Baidyanath Mookerjee |
Minister for the Forest, Judicial, Registration and General Affairs
In office 12 April 1947 – 1952
| Chief Ministers | Gopinath Bordoloi; Bishnuram Medhi |
| Preceded by | Bhimbor Deori |
| Succeeded by | Baidyanath Mookerjee |
Minister for Agriculture and Veterinary
In office 23 March 1945 – 11 February 1946
| Prime Minister | Muhammed Saadulah |
| Preceded by | Naba Kumar Dutta |
| Succeeded by | Abdul Matlib Mazumder |
Minister for General and Judicial Affairs
In office 25 August 1942 – 23 March 1945
| Prime Minister | Muhammed Saadulah |
| Preceded by | Muddabbir Hussain Chaudhuri |
| Succeeded by | Munawwar Ali |
Minister for the Forest (Note: Forests and Registration until 17 November 1939)
In office 19 September 1938 – 24 December 1941
| Prime Minister | Gopinath Bordoloi; Muhammed Saadulah |
| Preceded by | Rohini Kumar Chaudhuri |
| Succeeded by | Munawwar Ali |

Member of Assam Legislative Assembly
- In office 1937 – 1967
- Preceded by: Constituency established
- Succeeded by: Uttam Brahma
- Constituency: Sidli

Personal details
- Born: 15 June 1902 Kokrajhar, Assam, India
- Died: 23 January 1968 (aged 66) Kokrajhar, Assam, India
- Spouse(s): Damayanti Brahma (m. 1920, died) Swarnamoyee Brahma (m. 1958)
- Children: 10
- Parent: Dhajendra Brahma (father)
- Education: Cotton College
- Occupation: Poet, Politician, Social worker

Rupnath Brahma (Assamese: ৰূপনাথ ব্ৰহ্ম;15 June 1902– 23 January 1968) was a Bodo poet, politician and religious scholar in Assam who served as a Member of the Lok Sabha and Cabinet Minister of Assam serving continuously from 1937-1967)

== Early life ==
He was born on 15 June 1902 at Owabari village of Kokrajhar district to Dhajendra Brahma.

== Career ==
He is credited with helping establish Brahma Dharma. His poems were mostly mystic in character. He was also first minister from the Bodos. The Rupnath Brahma Inter-State Bus Terminal in Guwahati is named after him.

== Personal life and death ==
He died on 23 January 1968.

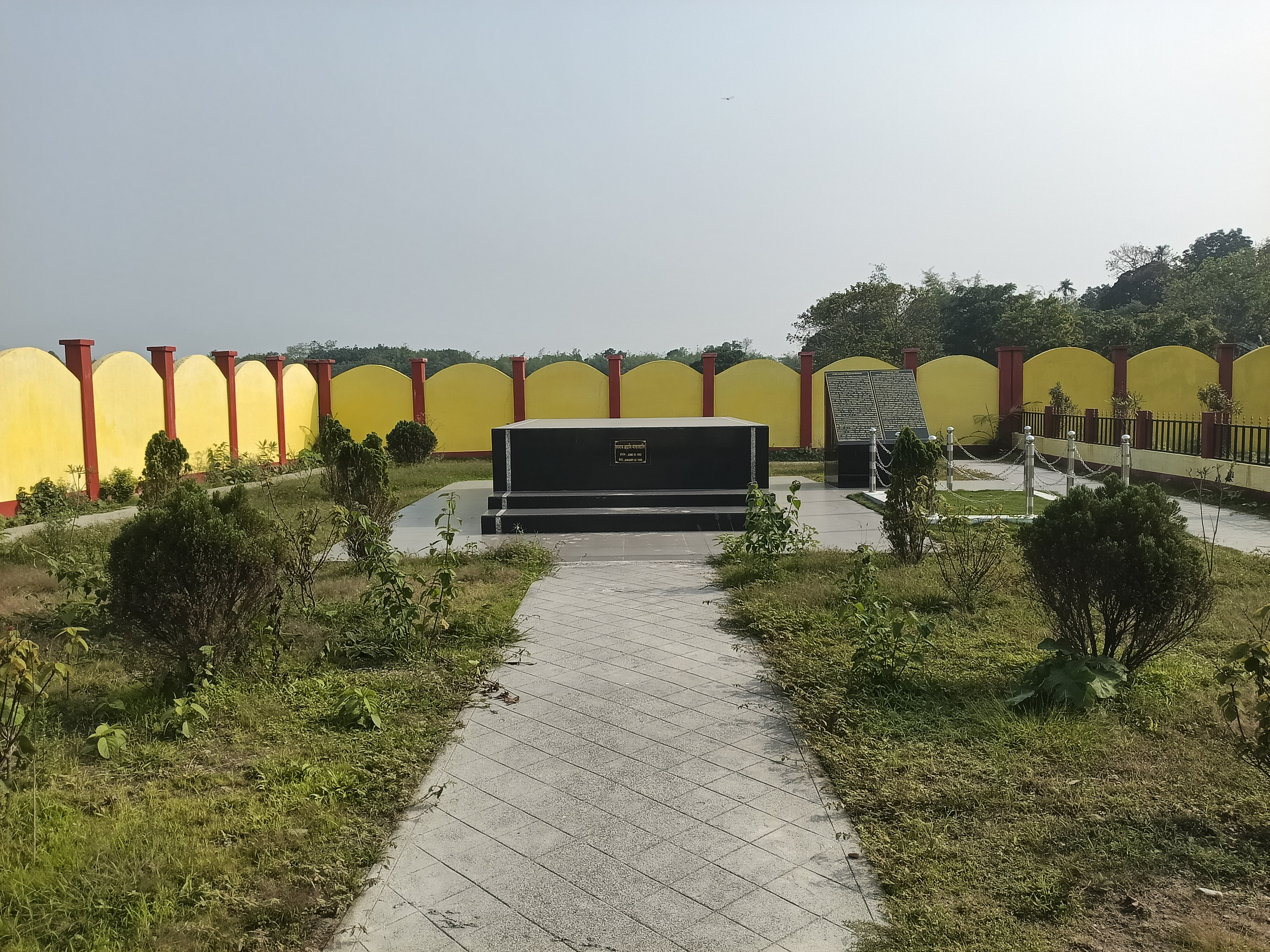
Grave of Rupnath Brahma in Owabari, Kokrajhar
