= Omeo Kumar Das =

Indian social worker, writer and politician

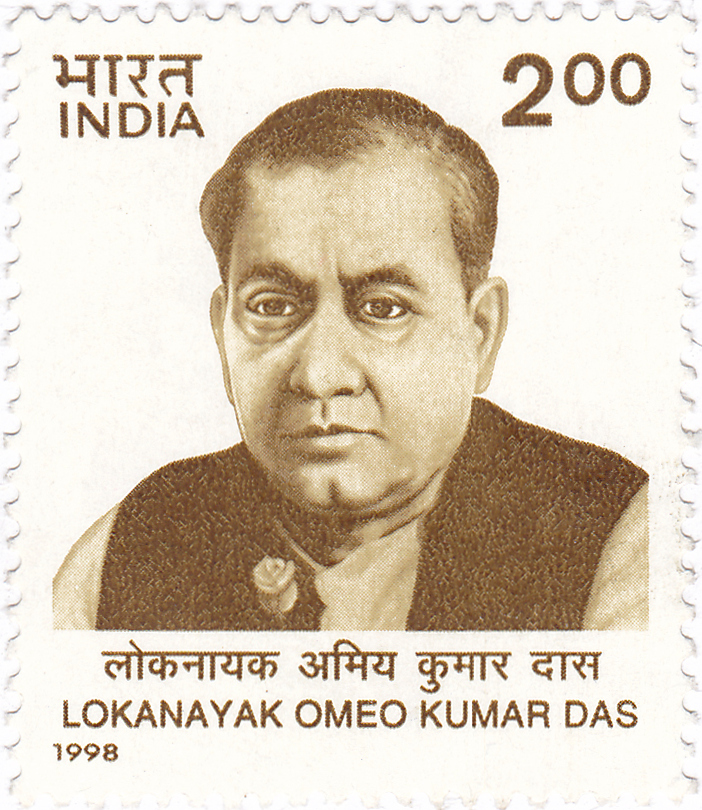

Minister for Labour, Agriculture, Education and Welfare of backward tribes (Note: As Minister for Labour and labour welfare Education, Development of backward areas, Welfare of backward classes and Publicity from 1952 to 1957)
- In office 9 August 1950 – 21 April 1957
- Chief Minister: Bishnuram Medhi
- Preceded by: Abdul Muhib Mazumder
- Succeeded by: K. P. Tripathi

Minister for Food, Supply and Labour
- In office 15 August 1947 – 5 August 1950
- Prime Minister: Gopinath Bordoloi
- Preceded by: Bhimbor Deori; Baidyanath Mookherjee
- Succeeded by: Mahendra Mohan Choudhry

Member of Assam Legislative Assembly
- In office 1937 – 1967
- Preceded by: Constituency established
- Succeeded by: Pushpalata Das
- Constituency: Dhekiajuli

Personal details
- Born: 21 May 1895 Nagaon, Assam, India
- Died: 23 January 1975 (aged 79) Guwahati, Assam, India
- Spouse: Pushpalata Das (m. 1942)
- Children: 1
- Occupation: Indian independence activist Social reformer Translator; Educationist
- Awards: Padma Bhushan

Omeo Kumar Das (21 May 1895 – 23 January 1975), popularly addressed as Lok Nayak, was an Indian social worker, Gandhian, educationist, writer and statesman. He held various ministerial portfolios such as Education, Labour and Food and Civil Supplies, during various periods, in the state of Assam. He translated The Story of My Experiments with Truth, the autobiography of Mahatma Gandhi, into Assamese language and contributed to the implementation of Tea Plantation Workers' Provident Fund in the state. The Government of India awarded him the third highest civilian honour of the Padma Bhushan, in 1963, for his contributions to society. India Post honoured Das by issuing a commemorative stamp on him on 15 May 1998.

== Early life ==
Das was born on 21 May 1895 at Nagaon district in the Northeast Indian state of Assam and his schooling was at Tezpur High School, Tezpur. He did his higher education at Cotton College, Guwahati and City College, Calcutta during which time he was reported to have been attracted to the activities of Indian independence activists such as Gopal Krishna Gokhale and Bal Gangadhar Tilak and started getting involved in student politics.

== Political life ==
He was one of the leaders of the Civil disobedience movement of 1930 in Assam and was jailed many times during the freedom struggle. He successfully contested the Assam Legislative Assembly and the Constituent Assembly elections of 1937 and 1945 respectively and, after the Indian independence, he represented Dhekiajuli Assembly constituency for three consecutive terms, 1951, '57 and '62. During these periods, he served as minister in various portfolios. It was during his tenure as the Labour minister, that the Workers' Provident Fund for the labourers of the tea plantations was instituted, an initiative reported to be among first such instances in Asia. As the minister of Education, his contributions were noted in the implementation of basic education scheme in Assam. He also served as the minister of Food and Civil Supplies for a period of time.

== Literary work ==
Das is credited with the publication of several books, including Mor Satya Aneshwanar Kahini, an Assamese language translation of The Story of My Experiments with Truth, the autobiography of Mahatma Gandhi. Gandhijir Jiboni, Mahatma Gandhik Aami Kidore Bujilu and Asomot Mahatma are some of his other works. He was involved with the activities of several social and Gandhian organisations such as Harijan Sevak Sangh, Bharatiya Adim Jati Sevak Sangha, Bharat Sevek Samaj, Gandhi Smarak Nidhi, Kasturba Smarak Nidhi and Assam Seva Samiti and was a part of their social activities like campaign against substance abuse and rehabilitation of patients afflicted with leprosy and tuberculosis.

== Awards and honours ==
The Government of India included him in the 1993 Republic Day honours list for the civilian award of the Padma Bhushan. He died on 23 January 1975, aged 81, survived by his wife, Pushpalata Das, renowned freedom activist and parliamentarian, and their daughter. Omeo Kumar Das Institute of Social Change and Development (OKD), Guwahati, an autonomous institution funded by the Indian Council of Social Science Research (ICSSR), was named after Das, on his birth centenary in 1995. India Post issued a commemorative postage stamp on him in 1998. A college at Dhekiajuli has been named, Lokonayak Omeo Kumar Das College, in his honour.

== See also ==
- Chandraprava Saikiani
- Pushpalata Das
- Kushal Konwar
- List of people on the postage stamps of India
