= Rajendra Mushahary =

Indian politician

Rajendra Mushahary is an All India Trinamool Congress politician from Assam. He was elected to the Assam Legislative Assembly in the 1985 and 1991 elections from Gossaigaon constituency.
