= Moinul Hoque Choudhury =

Indian politician (1923-1976)

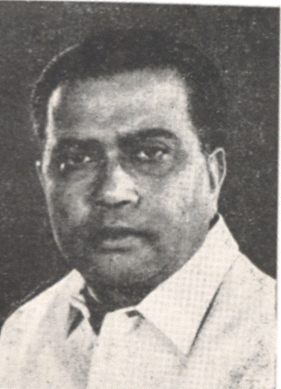

Union Minister of Industrial Development
- In office 18 March 1971 – 22 July 1972
- Prime Minister: Indira Gandhi
- Deputy: Ghanshyam Oza
- Preceded by: Dinesh Singh
- Succeeded by: Chidambaram Subramaniam

Member of Parliament, Lok Sabha
- In office 13 March 1971 – 13 February 1976
- Preceded by: Jahan Uddin Ahmed
- Succeeded by: Ahmed Hussain
- Constituency: Dhubri

Cabinet Minister, Assam
- In office 22 April 1957 – 16 March 1967
- Chief Minister: Bishnuram Medhi; Bimala Prasad Chaliha
- Departments: Food and Agriculture; Veterinary; Pisciculture; Co-operation; Parliamentary Affairs; Flood Control and Irrigation

Member, Assam Legislative Assembly
- In office 1952–1971
- Constituency: East Sonai/Sonai

Personal details
- Born: 23 May 1923 Sonabarighat, Cachar, Assam
- Died: 13 February 1976 (aged 52) Delhi
- Party: Indian National Congress
- Other political affiliations: Muslim League (before 1951)
- Spouse: Rashida Haque Choudhury
- Education: Cotton College, Guwahati; Murari Chand College, Sylhet; Presidency College Kolkata; Aligarh Muslim University

Moinul Hoque Choudhury (Bengali: মঈনুল হক চৌধুরী, Bengali pronunciation: [moinul hɔk tʃoudʱuri]; 13 May 1923 – 13 February 1976) was an Indian politician from Assam. A five-time MLA, he was the Minister of Commerce and Industrial Development during the Indira Gandhi regime in 1971. He is also known as the Industrial Reformer of the Barak Valley.

== Biography ==
Moinul Choudhury was born on 13 May 1923 in a well-off Bengali Muslim family of Sonabarighat in Cachar district of Assam. He was born to mother Mona Bibi and father Montajir Ali. His father Montazir Ali was educated, and was always concerned about getting his son well educated. Choudhury took his primary education from ME School of Sonabraighat. He passed Matriculation from Silchar Government HS School and later joined Cotton College, Guwahati/Murari Chand College of Sylhet and passed +2 in 1942.

He graduated with History Honors from Presidency College of Calcutta in 1944. In the Presidency, he defeated Sheikh Mujibur Rahman in the college election. He pursued MA in History securing first class first position from Aligarh Muslim University in 1946. This was when he joined Muslim League and took part in the Indian independence movement. He was also the general secretary of youth front of Muslim League on the national level. In 1947, he obtained LLB from Aligarh Muslim University. In a meeting with Mohammed Ali Jinnah, Moinul Hoque Choudhury represented Barak Valley. Inspired by the ideals of Netaji Subhas Chandra Bose and Moulana Abul Kalam Azad, Hoque joined the freedom struggle. Following India's independence and the partition of India, he joined Indian National Congress under the influence of Fakaruddin Ali Ahmed.

To start off his career, Moinul Hoque Choudhury joined the Bar Association of Silchar in 1948 and later in 1950, he joined active politics as a member of local board in 1950 and was a nominated member of Silchar Municipality in the same year. He became a member of Assam Legislative Assembly in 1952 from East Sonai constituency. Moinul Hoque became a cabinet minister (agriculture) in 1957 after being elected for the second time from the same constituency. On being elected for the third term in 1962, he became the leader of the Congress legislature in the assembly in addition to being a cabinet minister. In 1967. He was elected for the fourth time as MLA from Sonai Constituency, but was abstained from ministerial portfolio following a feud with Bimala Prasad Chaliha. He was selected as chairman of national Haj Committee in the same year. He entered the national politics in 1971 by returning to the parliament from Dhubri and was offered the ministry of industry under the Government of India.

There have been many in Barak valley who have been hugely influenced and inspired by him, particularly the Muslim men. His own younger brother Nurul Hoque also became MLA from Sonai .

== Work ==
The improvement of road and communication system, construction of embankments in Cachar to facilitate agriculture, establishment of All India Radio, Silchar Medical College, Veterinary school, Hindustan Paper Mill at Panchgram, Sugar Mill at Anipur, the Regional Engineering College now upgraded as NIT are some of his works.

== Timeline ==
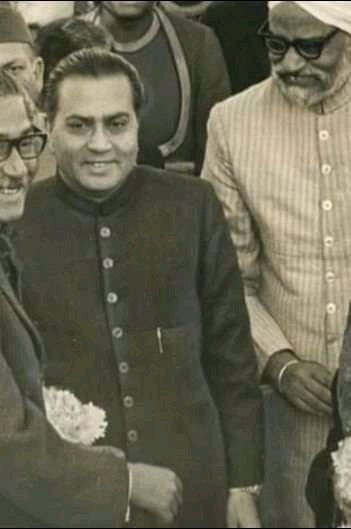
Moinul Hoque Choudhury seen with President of Bangladesh Sheikh Mujibur Rahman in Delhi on 11 January 1972.

- 13 May 1923: Born in Sonabarighat of Sonai, Silchar
- 1940: Passed Matriculation from Silchar Government HS School
- 1942: Passed +2 from Cotton College, Gauhati
- 1944: Completed graduation in History Honours from Presidency College, Kolkata
- 1946: Pursued MA in history from Aligarh Muslim University, joined Muslim League, took part in the freedom struggle of India.
- 1947: Obtained LLB from Aligarh Muslim University
- 1948: Joined Bar Association of Silchar
- 1950: Elected as member of local board
- 1951: Joined Indian National Congress
- 1952: Elected as MLA from Sonai Constituency, and member of Public Accounts Committee and Text Book
- 1957: Elected for the second time MLA from Sonai Constituency, won a ministerial portfolio, agriculture
- 1961: Attended UNO General Convention as one of the delegates from India
- 1962: Elected for the second time as a minister from Sonai constituency
- 1967: Elected for the fourth time as MLA from Sonai Constituency, but unfortunately was abstained from ministerial portfolio * following a feud with Bimala Prasad Chaliha, selected as chairman of national Haj Committee.
- 1968: Went on a pilgrimage to holy Mecca and Madina
- 1971: Elected as MP from Dhubri constituency in a by-election and won ministerial portfolio of Industrial Development
- 1976: Died in AIIMS, Delhi on 13 February aged 52.
