= Munawwar Ali =

Pakistani politician

Speaker of the East Bengal Legislative Assembly
- In office 1947–1948
- Preceded by: office established
- Succeeded by: Abdul Karim

Personal details
- Born: 1884 Sylhet District, North-East Frontier Province, British India
- Died: 11 December 1951 (aged 66–67)
- Party: EBML
- Other political affiliations: APML (1937–1947)
- Relatives: Mahmud Ali (nephew); D. M. H Obaidur Raza Chowdhury (nephew)
- Education: Muhammadan Anglo-Oriental College
- Profession: Lawyer

Munawwar Ali (1891–1951) was a Pakistani politician, lawyer, and poet.

== Early life ==
Ali was born in 1884 in Sylhet District of the North-East Frontier Province (later renamed Assam Province), British India (present-day Sunamganj District, Bangladesh). After completing his secondary education from a local school and higher secondary education from Presidency College, he obtained a Bachelor of Arts degree from Meerut College in 1907 and a Bachelor of Law degree from Muhammadan Anglo-Oriental College in 1909. In 1913, he became a member of the Indian Red Cross Society and served the wounded soldiers during the Balkan Wars. He continued his service as its member until 1919.

== Career ==
In 1919, he was elected a member of the Assam Legislative Assembly. During this time, he played a role in protecting the rights of Bengali Muslim migrants in his province. He served as the chairman of the Sunamganj Municipality from 1921 to 1937. In 1930, he was appointed chairman of the Assam Muslim League (Shafi) and held the position for five years. In 1937, he became a member of the All-India Muslim League (AIML). From 1938 to 1942 and again in 1944, he served as provincial minister in Assam. In 1946, he was appointed secretary of the parliamentary party of the Assam Provincial Muslim League (APML). In 1947, he campaigned in support of voting for joining Pakistan in the Sylhet referendum. After the independence of Pakistan, his tenure as a member of the Assam Legislative Assembly ended, and he became a member of the East Bengal Legislative Assembly. In 1947, he was elected Speaker of the East Bengal Legislative Assembly.

== Poetry ==
Ali was also a poet. His poetry collections include:

- Jilwa, 1942
- Bangla Amparar Kabyanubad, 1950

== Death, family and legacy ==
Ali died of a heart attack on 11 December 1951. He had six sons and two daughters. His father was Musaraf Ali, lawyer and co-founder of the Cachar Native Joint Stock Company. Politician D. M. H Obaidur Raza Chowdhury, and politician Mahmud Ali were his nephews. A book on his life titled Ek Alokito Bektitta Munawwar Ali, containing articles by multiple authors, has been published by Sompadona Parishad.
