= Gopinath Bordoloi =

Indian politician (1890–1950)

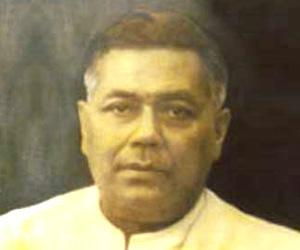
- Official Portrait, 1946

1st Chief Minister of Assam
- In office 11 February 1946 – 5 August 1950
- Preceded by: Office Established
- Succeeded by: Bishnu Ram Medhi

Chairman of North-East Frontier Tribal Areas and Assam Excluded & Partially Excluded Areas Sub-Committee
- Leader: Vallabhbhai Patel
- Preceded by: Office Established

Personal details
- Born: 6 June 1890 Raha, Assam, British India
- Died: 5 August 1950 (aged 60) Guwahati, Assam, India
- Party: Indian National Congress
- Spouse: Surawala Bordoloi
- Education: Cotton University; University of Calcutta
- Occupation: Politician, writer
- Awards: Bharat Ratna (1999)

Gopinath Bordoloi (6 June 1890 – 5 August 1950) was an Indian politician and independence activist who served as the 1st Chief Minister of Assam from 1946 to his death in 1950. He was also the chairman of North-East Frontier Tribal areas and Assam Excluded and Partially Excluded Areas Sub-Committee. He was a follower of the Gandhian principle of non-violence as a political tool. Bordoloi was posthumously given the title of Lokpriya (transl. beloved of the people) by the Governor of Assam Jairamdas Daulatram.

== Early life and education ==
Gopinath Bordoloi was born on 6 June 1890 in Raha, Nagaon district, Assam, as the third child of Buddheswar and Praneswari Bordoloi. His father, Buddheswar, was a government medical officer.His mother, Praneswari, died when he was twelve years old. After his mother's death, he was raised by his widowed elder sister and his father. He left Raha at a young age to complete his early schooling in Guwahati, which was his family's ancestral home as well as the premier city of Assam. He remained in Guwahati for his first two years of university, studying at Cotton College and completing his I.A. degree in 1909. In 1909 he left Guwahati to study at the Calcutta University-affiliated Scottish Church College, from which he received his B.A. degree in 1911. He studied at Calcutta University afterwards, obtaining an M.A. degree in history in 1914 and a B.L. degree in 1915.

After completing his education, Bordoloi returned to Guwahati and became headmaster of Sonaram High School. He passed the law examination while in Guwahati, and in 1917 he started his legal practice in the city. During his early legal career, he came under the influence of Tarun Ram Phookan, who became an early mentor of his.

== Political life ==
=== Early political career ===
Bardoloi and Phookan both began their political careers in the autumn of 1920, and the two became among the first leaders of the Assam Pradesh Congress Committee (APCC) when it was founded in June 1921, alongside Nabin Chandra Bardoloi. Gopinath was greatly influenced by Phookan and Nabhin Chandra's politics.

While attending the meeting of 36th Indian National Congress (INC), Ahmedabad in 1921 as a spokesman of the APCC, Bordoloi was able to talk with Mohandas Gandhi for several hours. During Gandhi's visit to Assam in 1921, Bardoloi became a spiritual and political protégée of Gandhi.

In 1924, Bardoloi became a member of the Local Board of the Kamrup district and a member of the Guwahati Municipality Board, eventually becoming chairman of the latter from 1934 to 1938. For the 41st Indian National Congress in 1926, Bardoloi was elected to be an assistant general secretary for the Assam Congress. Bardoloi attended the 1929 Lahore session of the INC, but was greatly displeased with the INC's decision to boycott the legislative councils. Though he did not cut off ties with the INC like Phookan and Rohini Kumar Chaudhury did, he did resign from his position as president of the Guwahati District Congress Committee on 27 February 1930 in protest. Phookan, Chaudhury, and Bardoloi issued a joint statement expressing their opposition to the INC's Council boycott, believing that members of the INC should remain in the legislative councils to oppose the passage of repressive measures. He was once more elected to the presidency of the Guwahati District Congress Committee on 6 April 1930 however. He soon after was offered membership in the Working Committee of the APCC, which had just recently come under the leadership of Bishnuram Medhi.

When the Civil Disobedience movement began in 1930, Medhi faced imminent imprisonment for his involvement in the movement. Medhi asked Bordoloi to replace him as president of the APCC given this, but Bordoloi refused, which consequently put the APCC into a period of difficulties after Medhi's arrest. Bordoloi would afterwards refrain from participating in the second phase of the Civil Disobedience movement. His refusal to take the mantle of presidency or to participate in the 1932-1934 phase of the Civil Disobedience movement resulted in many radicals in the INC harboring a grudge against him, which would persist for the rest of Bordoloi's life. Around this time, Bordoloi became involved in the recently revived Assam Association, which advocated for the creation of a separate High Court and University for Assam.

In 1934, Bardoloi joined Gandhi during his visit to the Dalit community in Guwahati, resulting in Bardoloi becoming aware of the poor conditions the Dalits lived under in the city. Bardoloi, in his role as the new Chairman of the Guwahati Municipality Board, then began work to alleviate some of these poor conditions. After Gandhi's visit to Assam, local social workers set up the All Assam Harijan Sevak Sangha under the leadership of Pitambar Deva Goswami. Bardoloi, as Chairman, contributed funds and men to aid the organisation.

Soon after, Bardoloi also became a leader of the Rastra Bhasa Prachar Samiti in Assam, which worked to popularise Hindi education in the province.

Congress ended their boycott of legislative councils in its 1936 Lucknow session, and decided to compete in the 1937 Indian provincial elections. Bardoloi decided to run in the 1937 elections as an INC candidate, and was successfully elected to the Assam Legislative Assembly from the South Guwahati Constituency. The INC won 33 seats out of 108, and on 22 February 1937 Bardoloi was elected the leader of the Assam Congress Legislative Party. The INC, under their policy of non-acceptance of office, did not attempt to form government however. Syed Muhammad Saadulla was consequently invited by the Governor of Assam to become Premier of Assam. Bardoloi became unhappy with the Saadulla's Ministry's policies, particularly its budget, criticising its provisions for the funding of the British Indian Army and the bureaucracy. The Saadulla Ministry, which had only a bare working majority and faced a hostile opposition in the INC, had many of its bills shot down in the legislature. To improve the legislative performance of his Ministry, Saadulla joined the All-India Muslim League to gain the support of Muslim members of the House, resigned, and then reconstituted his cabinet on 5 February 1938, now with the support of 58 members in the House.

About four months later, the INC had altered its policy of non-acceptance of office, and then moved to form Ministries in provinces where it held a majority. The INC in Assam was later able to secure the support of an additional 15 members, including nine Muslims and six Hindus, bringing the party only four more members away from securing a majority. Bordoloi then began attempts to oust Saadulla, hoping to force him out by a direct vote of no-confidence, urging the Governor to summon an early session of the Legislature so that the INC may bring said vote to the floor.

=== Premier of Assam (September 1938 – November 1939) ===
Bordoloi's efforts to oust Saadulla succeeded in September 1938 when, according to Subhas Chandra Bose, eleven Muslim members from the Surma Valley signed a statement agreeing to support a no-confidence motion against Saadulla. The motion was afterwards put against Saadulla, and rather than face the vote, he decided to resign. Bordoloi afterwards sought to form a coalition Ministry with the support of 60 members of the House, and was then invited to the Government House to speak with Governor Robert Reid. He then spoke with Maulana Abul Kalam Azad and Bose on the telephone, requesting they come to Shillong immediately. On 20 September, Muslim and European members of the Assembly sent in multiple no-confidence motions against Bardoloi, though these were ruled out as Bardoloi and his Ministry had not yet assumed office. Later that day, Bardoloi's cabinet, including five Hindus and three Muslims, took their oaths of office and allegiance, and Bardoloi became Premier of Assam. The first meeting of the Bardoloi Coalition Cabinet was met with huge crowds, who gave cheers and shouts of Bande Mataram. Shortly after the first meeting though, 56 members of the Opposition, led by F. W. Hockenhull, MLA from the European Planting constituency, unanimously resolved to oppose Bardoloi's government. The Opposition alleged that INC did not truly have the support of 60 members as Bordoloi claimed, but rather had only 52 supporters, making them a minority government. Abiding by their resolution, on 21 September the 56 members of the Opposition, including the leaders of the European Group, the United People's Party, the United Muslim Party, the Muslim League group, and the Progressive Nationalist groups submitted 56 no-confidence motions against the Bordoloi Ministry to the Governor, requesting he summon the House immediately. The European group had taken on this more militant anti-Congress attitude largely due to the arrival of an official of the Tea Planters' Association.

Bardoloi later informed the Governor that he indeed could no longer claim a majority at the moment, as the eleven Muslim MLAs from the Surma Valley had changed their mind after Saadulla's resignation and now no longer supported Bardoloi's government. Despite this, the Governor allowed Bardoloi to continue his efforts to form a Ministry. A. K. Fazlul Huq, then Chief Minister of Bengal, supporting the Opposition against Bardoloi, stated that "The question of the Ministry in Assam is now an all-India one, and affects Muslims all over India". Huq called on the Muslims of Assam to make no coalition with the INC.

Bardoloi, a few days after becoming Premier of Assam, embarked on a week-long tour of the province. From Shillong, he, accompanied by Rupnath Brahma, went to Guwahati, Dhubri, and Goalpara. He then set about getting the eleven Muslim MLAs from the Surma Valley to once more support him. While the Opposition declared that after the resignation of Saadulla they were able to consolidate the Muslims, including the eleven from the Surma Valley, against the INC, Bose and Bardoloi conversely declared that these eleven were being kept "under strict guard" and that they had been put under physical restraints, which prevented them from acting as free men. Bardoloi stated that he planned to meet with the eleven and secure their support before December, when the House was set to meet.

In the subsequent weeks, Bardoloi worked to win the support of stragglers in the Assembly. When the House met on 1 December 1938, a no-confidence motion was presented against the Bardoloi Cabinet. The Opposition accused the government of various things, including but not limited to failing to secure an adequate land revenue reduction, including "inefficient members without any following in the Cabinet", being responsible for communal riots, and depriving some MLAs of their freedom of movement. The Europeans had their own criticism of the government, accusing them of attacking the European-controlled industries of Assam. The government's supporters countered by stating that they had done everything in their power to fulfill their election pledges. After two and a half hours of debate, the motion was defeated by 54 votes to 50, with one abstention. Thus Bardoloi's coalition government was able to continue its rule.

The Bardoloi Government, during its fourteen months in power, passed a variety of bills, including an act prohibiting the opium trade, the Agricultural Income Tax Bill, and an act for jail administration reform. The Agricultural Income Tax Bill received staunch opposition from the European group, as the bill called for a tax on the profits of the tea industry, and 84% of tea estates in the Assam Valley were under the control of the European managing agency houses, but it passed despite this. The Government also passed various other comparatively more minor acts, including one to equalise the rating system, one to protect the property of wards from their creditors, one to enable women to be elected to municipal committees, and one to allow well-behaved convicts to be released on probation. The Government, however, as Reginald Coupland put it, "was gravely handicapped from the outset by lack of revenue—each year's budget showed a deficit—and a constructive social policy was on that account alone impracticable". The Government was also limited in how much they could accomplish due to only having a period of fourteen months in power. As a result, Bardoloi's Government was unable to do much in the way of agrarian reform. The Government increased the reduction in land-dues by, in some cases, one-half, decreased the salaries of ministers, and released political prisoners in the Province, but struggled to fulfill other aspects of the INC's electoral programme.

In 1939, after Viceroy of India, the Marquess of Linlithgow, declared war on Germany on India's behalf, the Congress Working Committee called upon Congress Ministries across India to resign. Bardoloi, heeding this call, resigned, and Saadulla consequently returned to form his own government.

=== Post-Premiership ===
The INC afterwards began a satyagraha campaign to turn public opinion against India's involvement in the Second World War. Bardoloi joined this campaign, and on 26 November 1940 he left Assam to meet Gandhi at his Sevagram Ashram in Wardha. After meeting with Gandhi, Bardoloi returned to Assam and embarked on a satyagraha campaign in front of the Deputy Commissioner's Court in Guwahati before a crowd of 10,000. Bardoloi was consequently arrested and sentenced to one year in prison, though was released on 18 June 1941 due to his health.

On 28 July 1941, Saadulla announced his Land Development Scheme, which included provisions for the opening up of reserve forests and waste lands to immigrants. This displeased many in the Assam Congress, and the majority of them consequently became favourable towards a return of the INC to the legislature. Bardoloi visited Gandhi in Wardha to discuss the issue, and in the autumn of 1941, Bardoloi reportedly obtained permission from INC leadership to once more participate in parliamentary politics. In December, Rohini Kumar Chaudhury, who was the Saadulla Ministry's Education Minister, announced his resignation and formed a new party. This was sparked by internal friction within Saadulla's Government over student protests in Guwahati which called for the removal of the Deputy Commissioner of Guwahati; Saadulla was against the removal of the Deputy Commissioner, whereas Chaudhury was in favour. A few days later, Saadulla and the other ministers in his government resigned. The Governor of Assam consequently invited Bardoloi to become Premier and form a Ministry. Bardoloi, however, refused office. He stated that he and his party would support Chaudhury should he become Premier, but would not cooperate on matters of the war effort and would not vote for expenditure towards the war. The Governor then interviewed Chaudhury, who claimed that he could successfully work with the Opposition to carry out war measures should he be made Premier, though the Governor was unconvinced. After Saadulla declined to form another government, the Governor took over the administration of Assam, stating that he would not accept any Ministry which would not fully participate in the war.

After the beginning of the Japanese occupation of Burma in 1942, many war evacuees from Burma and Malaya arrived in Assam. Bardoloi and other INC workers consequently worked to organise santi senas in the province to aid the refugees. In August of that year, the All India Congress Committee, in a meeting in Bombay, called for the immediate withdrawal of Britain from India, marking the beginning of the Quit India Movement. The colonial government quickly moved to arrest prominent Congress leaders, including Bardoloi, and the INC was declared unlawful. Bardoloi remained incarcerated in Dhubri until 26 January 1944 due to his poor health, namely his eye trouble and high blood pressure. He was allowed to go to Calcutta for medical treatment, but afterwards was kept interned in Guwahati.

After the conclusion of his internment, Bardoloi decided to attend the November session of the Assam Assembly. By March 1945, the INC's ranks had grown to 18 members within the Assembly, and with the Saadulla Ministry becoming unstable due to dissensions within his Government, he formed an agreement with Bardoloi to secure the INC's support for his government. The terms of this agreement included the release of political prisoners and the termination of all arrest orders on political leaders, the ending of the ban on public assembly, the scrapping of the Land Development Scheme, and the handing over of the administration of the Revenue Department to Chaudhury. The Saadulla Ministry thus resigned on 23 March, and returned soon after with tacit Congress support.

On 31 May, the government's ban on the Assam Congress was lifted. In July 1945, INC leadership instructed Bardoloi, then leader of the INC in the Assam Legislative Assembly, to withdraw his support from the Saadulla Ministry and to form a Congress Ministry in Assam afterwards if it became necessary. He consequently withdrew his support, with Bardoloi's cited reason being the Saadulla Government's violation of a prior agreement which provided for the release of all political prisoners, stating "although the agreement was that they should be released after an examination of their cases, no one has been released till now". Saadulla rejected this, stating "I maintain that the Government has virtually fulfilled all that I agreed to do", and accusing Bardoloi of being "not a free agent", adding that "whatever is ordered by your party and the Congress High Command you have to obey implicitly".

The Assam Assembly was soon after dissolved on 1 October 1945 in the prelude to the 1946 Indian provincial elections. After the elections, the INC under Bardoloi's leadership was able to secure the support of 61 members out of 103, securing a majority. The new Bardoloi Ministry was sworn in on 11 February 1946.

== Cabinet commission and Bordoloi's role ==
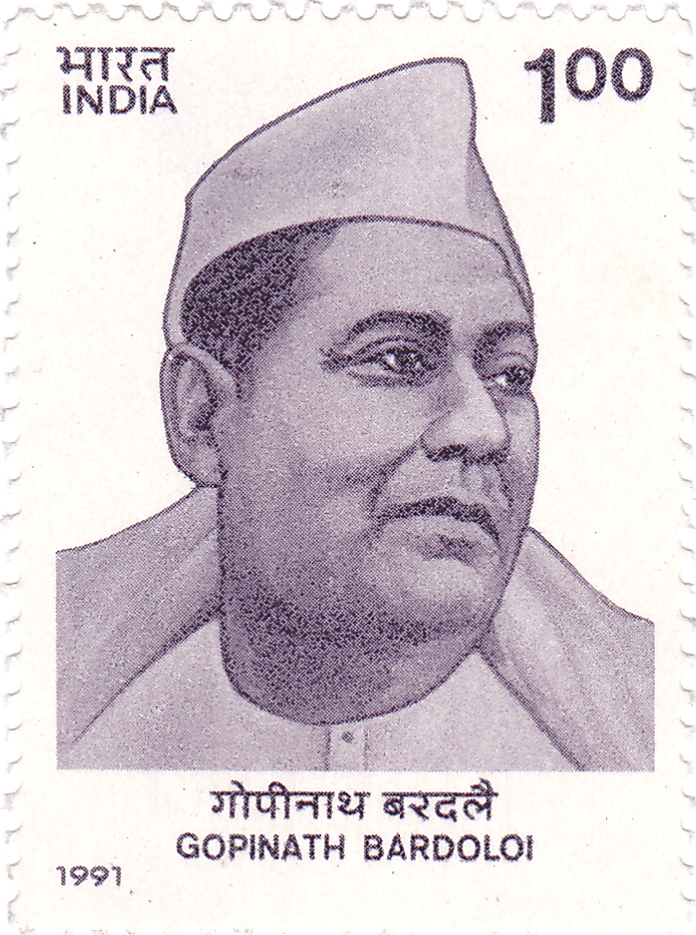
Bordoloi on a 1991 stamp of India

The British Government formed the Cabinet Mission of 1946 to discuss the demands for Indian Independence. The members held meetings with the Congress and the Muslim League in Shimla and Delhi. Their plan included grouping of states into 3 categories for selecting the candidates to form the constitutional body with Assam and Bengal in third group. Gopinath Bordoloi sensed the ominous sign for Assam in the plan as the inclusion would mean the local representatives will become minority in comparison to Bengal. That would be devastating for rights of people of Assam.

The Assam Pradesh Congress Committee decided to go against the grouping plan. Gopinath Bordoloi told the Indian National Congress working committee, Cabinet committee and the Viceroy that the representatives of Assam will form the Constitution of Assam themselves and will decide whether to join the group or not among themselves. Subsequently, the Cabinet commission announced that the grouping will be mandatory for every state and they may later withdraw from the group if they want. This further complicated the situation. Bordoloi met the Indian National Congress leaders to discuss it with no result. He then, with the Assam Congress Committee, decided to start mass agitation in Assam. Only after this, the Indian National Congress working committee advised them to pass a unanimous decision in Assembly. Later, the members of the Assembly suggested a working formula in which ten representatives from Assam would form their own constitution without joining any group and would merge with national committee to form the Indian constitution.

In 1947, Lord Mountbatten took over as new Viceroy. He held separate meetings with the Muslim League, Congress and Mahatma Gandhi. They decided to go for Partition as a permanent solution instead of grouping. India and Pakistan became separate independent countries.

Thus, Gopinath Bordoloi played a major role in securing the future of Assam which would have been included in East Pakistan otherwise.

== Contribution as Chief Minister ==
After India's Independence, he worked closely with Sardar Vallabhbhai Patel to secure the sovereignty of Assam against China on one hand and Pakistan on the other. He also helped to organise the rehabilitation of millions of Hindu refugees who had fled East Pakistan due to widespread violence and intimidation in the aftermath of Partition. His work formed the basis for ensuring communal harmony, democracy and stability which effectively kept Assam secure and progressive right up to the 1971 Bangladesh Liberation War. He was instrumental in establishing Gauhati University, High Court of Assam, Assam Medical College, Assam Veterinary College, etc. Gopinath Bordoloi was also a gifted writer. He wrote several books like Annasaktiyog, Shreeramachandra, Hajrat Mohammad, and Budhhadeb while in jail. Throughout his life, he was a stern believer in Gandhian principles. He led a simple life in spite of being a Chief Minister. He died on 5 August 1950.

== Awards and recognition ==
Former Prime Minister Atal Bihari Vajpayee conferred upon him the Bharat Ratna posthumously in 1999. A life-size statue of Bordoloi was unveiled on 1 October 2002 in the Parliament House by the President of India, A.P.J. Abdul Kalam.

== Bibliography ==
- Nirode Kumar Barooah: Gopinath Bardoloi, 'The Assam Problem' and Nehru's Centre. Bhabani Books 2010, ISBN 978-9380390536
