= Bishnuram Medhi =

2nd Chief Minister of Assam

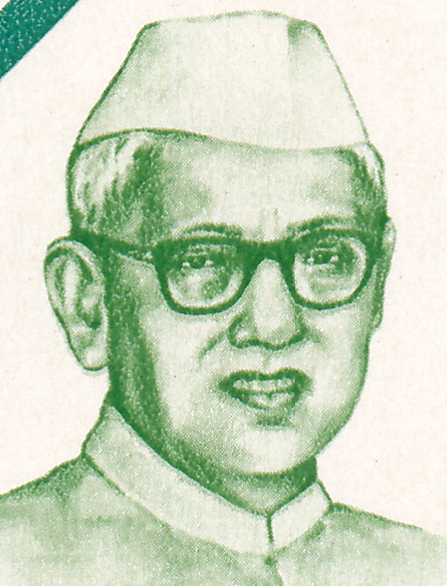
- Medhi on a 1989 stamp of India

5th Governor of Madras State
- In office 24 January 1958 – 4 May 1964
- Chief Minister: K. Kamaraj; M. Bhaktavatsalam
- Preceded by: A. J. John
- Succeeded by: Jayachamarajendra Wadiyar

2nd Chief Minister of Assam
- In office 9 August 1950 – 27 December 1957
- Governor: Jairamdas Daulatram; Fazal Ali
- Preceded by: Gopinath Bordoloi
- Succeeded by: Bimala Prasad Chaliha

Member of Assam Legislative Assembly
- In office 1967 - 1972
- Preceded by: Mahendra Mohan Choudhury
- Succeeded by: Renuka Devi Barkataki
- Constituency: Hajo
- In office 1951 - 1958
- Preceded by: constituency established
- Succeeded by: Mahendra Mohan Choudhury
- Constituency: Hajo

Personal details
- Born: 24 April 1888 Hajo, Assam Province, British India
- Died: 21 January 1981 (aged 92)
- Party: Indian National Congress
- Spouse: Nirmala Medhi

Bishnuram Medhi (24 April 1888 – 21 January 1981) was an Indian politician and freedom-fighter who served as the Chief Minister of Assam from 1950 to 1957 and Governor of Madras State from January 1958 till May 1964.

== Early life ==
Bishnuram Medhi was born to poor Assamese peasants, Sonaram and Alehi, of Hajo, near Gauhati, on 24 April 1888. He was a very bright student. Bishnuram studied at Cotton Collegiate School in Gauhati (now Guwahati) and completed his matriculation in 1905. His forefathers settled in Hajo in the early 18th century from the erstwhile Koch Kingdom, Cooch Behar state via Barpeta and were given the charge of "Medhi" in the famous Hayagriva Madhava Temple of Hajo. One prominent person of Hajo, late Holiram Medhi, became an Extra Assistant Commissioner under British Rule after studying at Gauripur, in the English School run by the Jaminder of Gauripur as there was no other school in Assam, at that time, imparting modern English education. Perseverance for education of Late Holiram Medhi perhaps enthused child Bishnuram to dream big and pursue higher studies himself which was very uncommon in those days. On completion of his schooling, he joined Presidency College, then affiliated with the University of Calcutta, and completed his post graduation in organic chemistry from Dhaka University in 1911. His close friend was famous Bengali industrialist, founder of Power Tools And Appliances Co. Ltd. Nagendra Nath Das. Bishnuram pursued his studies in law and was called to the bar in 1914.

== Indian Independence Movement ==
Bishnuram joined the Indian National Congress in the 1920s and participated in the Non-Cooperation Movement. In 1926, he was appointed Joint-Secretary of the Reception Committee of the Pandu session of the Indian National Congress. In 1930, Bishnuram was elected President of the Assam Provincial Congress.

Bishnuram Medhi assisted and played crucial role with Gopinath Bordoloi in securing Assam for India and preventing from being a part of East Pakistan under grouping during India's Independence.

== Post-independence politics ==
When provincial autonomy was introduced in 1935, Bishnuram served as the finance minister in Gopinath Bordoloi's cabinet. In 1950, Bishnuram was elected Chief Minister of Assam and served from 1950 to 1957. As the Chief Minister, Medhi understood the gravity of the illegal influx from Bangladesh posing serious threat to the local population. He took stern action against illegal settlers which made him unpopular amongst few powerful members of his own party who considered the settlers as prominent vote bank.

Medhi also advocated for strong action against the rebelling Nagas. He was a teetotaller and strict disciplinarian as an individual and also in public life. During his time, Naga insurgency was gaining momentum under Angami Zapu Phizo. It is believed that initiative to divide the Naga leaders by the Government machineries led to the killing of another charismatic Naga leader Sakhrie in 1956 by Phizo group. It was also rumoured that Bishnuram's personal dislike for some of the tribal customs added fuel to the rebellion in the hilly areas of Assam. Certainly, Bishnuram disapproved activities of the communists, publicly deplored them and announced award of Ten Thousand on Bishnu Prasad Rabha, another legendary son of Assam and rebel leader of the communist movement in Assam. He was equally suspicious on the activities of the Christian Missionaries and their role in fermenting secessionist activities in the hill districts of undivided Assam.

Bishnuram's political adversaries, including many luminaries of Assam, labelled charges against him to the High Command anticipating erosion of political support for his hard measures against illegal settlers and Naga Rebellion. His relation with late Fakhruddin Ali Ahmed and other leaders slowly turned sour and eventually Bishnuram Medhi was taken out from Assam as the Governor of Madras in spite of being a popular public leader. His dedication, simplicity, honesty and love for Assam and India was legendary. He is known as the Iron Man of Assam.

It's no wonder that after departure of Bishnuram from the political scenario of Assam, rampant illegal influx from Bangladesh took place on political patronage for which Bishnuram was a stumbling block. It took considerable time for the successor of Bishnuram, Late B P Chaliha, to appreciate the influx problem and take some steps during his third stint as Chief Minister. After his return from Madras, Bishnuram again became member of Legislative Assembly, yet he was not considered by his party for any sensitive post. Perhaps his love for his state and no nonsense approach became a misfit in the changed political equation. From 1958 to 1964, Bishnuram served as the Governor of Madras.

== Death ==
Bishnuram Medhi had a long eventful life which came to an end on 21 January 1981 at the age of 92. He did not have any children. As per his wish, his home at Hajo was converted into Shishu Kalyan Kendra (children welfare centre) while the other house in Latasil, Guwahati, was made a children library under Bishnu Nirmala Trust. His wife, Nirmala Medhi, was a devoted and pious lady. It is said that Nirmala Medhi, an expert weaver herself, took hand weaving tools to Madras Rajbhawan. One Tamil gentleman saw the Late Nirmala Medhi weaving the traditional Assamese Gamocha and appreciating the tremendous business potential, started producing Gamocha in Madras in large scale and thus Gamocha from Madras (Tamil Nadu) started selling in Assam.
