= Second Saadulah ministry =

1939 cabinet in the Indian province of Assam

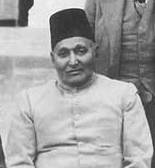
- Date formed: 17 November 1939
- Date dissolved: 24 December 1941

People and organisations
- Governor: Robert Reid
- Prime Minister: Muhammed Saadulah
- Member parties: Assam Valley Party; All-India Muslim League

History
- Predecessor: Bordoloi I
- Successor: Governor's Rule

The Second Saadulah provincial government was the Cabinet of Assam Province headed by Prime Minister of Assam Muhammed Saadulah from 1939 to 1941.

== History ==
Following the resignation of the Bordoloi government, Muhammed Saadulah formed a coalition government. The previous government had resigned in objection to the Second World War, but Saadulah was a support of the British.

In December 1941, Congress leaders including Bordoloi were released from prison and became determined to remove Saadulah from his position.

In protest against a government circular for the participation of students in a War Fund Exhibition, around 2500 students of Cotton College staged a protest at Guwahati Judge Field on 6 December. Police attacked students with a lathi charge. Numerous schools and colleges were on three-day sympathy strikes in Assam, as well as in Calcutta. Education Minister Rohini Kumar Chaudhuri resigned on 9 December in protest against the police action.

Before his resignation, Rohini Kumar Chaudhuri had entered into a secret pact with Bordoloi in which Congress would support Chaudhuri in a forming a stable government but would be neutral in matters related to the war effort. Another condition in the agreement was that the executive officers responsible for the lathi charge would be suspended. President of Assam Pradesh Congress Committee Muhammad Tayabulla opposed Bordoloi in this agreement, having voiced his disapproval of Chaudhuri's association with the War front, but Bordoloi persisted.

On 9 December, the same day as Chaudhuri's resignation, five independent members (allied to Congress) tabled motions of no-confidence against the Saadulah government, and three of the motions were moved. Saadulah was determined to continue on, but with more legislators leaving him, he was left with no option but to resign. Saadulah announced the resignation of his cabinet on 12 December.

Governor Robert Reid met Bordoloi on 18 December and asked him to form a government, but Bordoloi stated that he was unable to do so and voiced his support for Chaudhuri, and Bordoloi also made it clear that his support for the war would be limited". Reid was not supportive of this suggestion; he later had a discussion with Chaudhuri which made it "indisputably clear" to him that a ministry reliant on the support of Congress would be unstable, most prominently when a matter of war was concerned.

Reid instead contemplated reinstalling Saadulah but Saadulah was unable to command a majority. He also explored forming an "all-party" government whose focus would be for the purpose of and during the war, but was unsuccessful. Consequently, with Reid having explored numerous other possibilities, Governor's rule was declared on 25 December.

Chauduri felt that he could have formed his ministry, but it would have relied on the support of Congress. Both Reid and his successor Andrew Clow refused to accept a ministry which would have been formed on its support from a party which did not support the war effort.

== Ministers (1941) ==
=== Cabinet ===
Name	Portfolios
Muhammed Saadulah Prime Minister	Home
Cabinet Ministers
Rohini Kumar Chaudhuri	Education; Prisons
Munawwar Ali	Agriculture; Veterinary
Hirendra Chandra Chakravarty	Medical; Public health
Muddabbir Hussain Chaudhuri	Judicial; Local self-government
Mahendra Nath Saikia	Excise
Abdul Matin Chaudhury	Public Works; Labour
Sayidur Rahman	Finance; Revenue; Legislation
Mavis Dunn	Registration; Industries; Cooperative
Rupnath Brahma	Forest

=== Parliamentary secretaries ===
Name	Portfolios
B.K.J. Sarwan	Labour
Benjamin Ch. Momin	Hills tribal
Kalachand Roy	Scheduled caste
Dhirsing Deuri	Plains tribal
