= First Saadulah ministry =

1937 cabinet in the Indian province of Assam

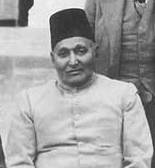
- Date formed: 1 April 1937
- Date dissolved: 19 September 1938

People and organisations
- Governor: Robert Reid; Henry Joseph Twynam
- Prime Minister: Muhammed Saadulah
- Member parties: Assam Valley Party; All-India Muslim League

History
- Election: 1937
- Successor: Bordoloi I

The First Saadulah provincial government was the first Cabinet of Assam Province headed by Prime Minister of Assam Muhammed Saadulah from 1937 to 1938. The government was formed following the 1937 Indian provincial elections, and consisted of two coalition-cabinets.

== History ==
Following the Government of India Act 1935 and the 1937 Indian provincial elections, the Indian National Congress won 33 out of the 108 seats in the house and formed the largest party. However, since non-acceptance on forming a ministry was a Congress policy, Muhammed Saadulah formed a coalition ministry.

In September 1938, the government faced pressure for its communal policies and its neglect of the "people of the soil", and in order to avoid a defeat in a motion of no-confidence, Saadulah resigned.

== Ministers (1937) ==
=== Cabinet ===
The first coalition cabinet lasted from 1 April 1937 to 4 February 1938.

Name	Portfolios	Party
Muhammed Saadulah Prime Minister	Home; Finance; Public Works Department	All-India Muslim league
Cabinet Ministers
Abu Nasar Muhammad Waheed	Education	United Muslim Party
James Joy Mohan Nichols Roy	Local self-government; Excise	Progressive Party (Assam)
Rohini Kumar Chaudhuri	Revenue; Judicial; General	United People's Party
Ali Haider Khan	Agriculture; Industries; Cooperative societies; Registration	United Muslim Party

== Ministers (1938) ==
=== Cabinet ===
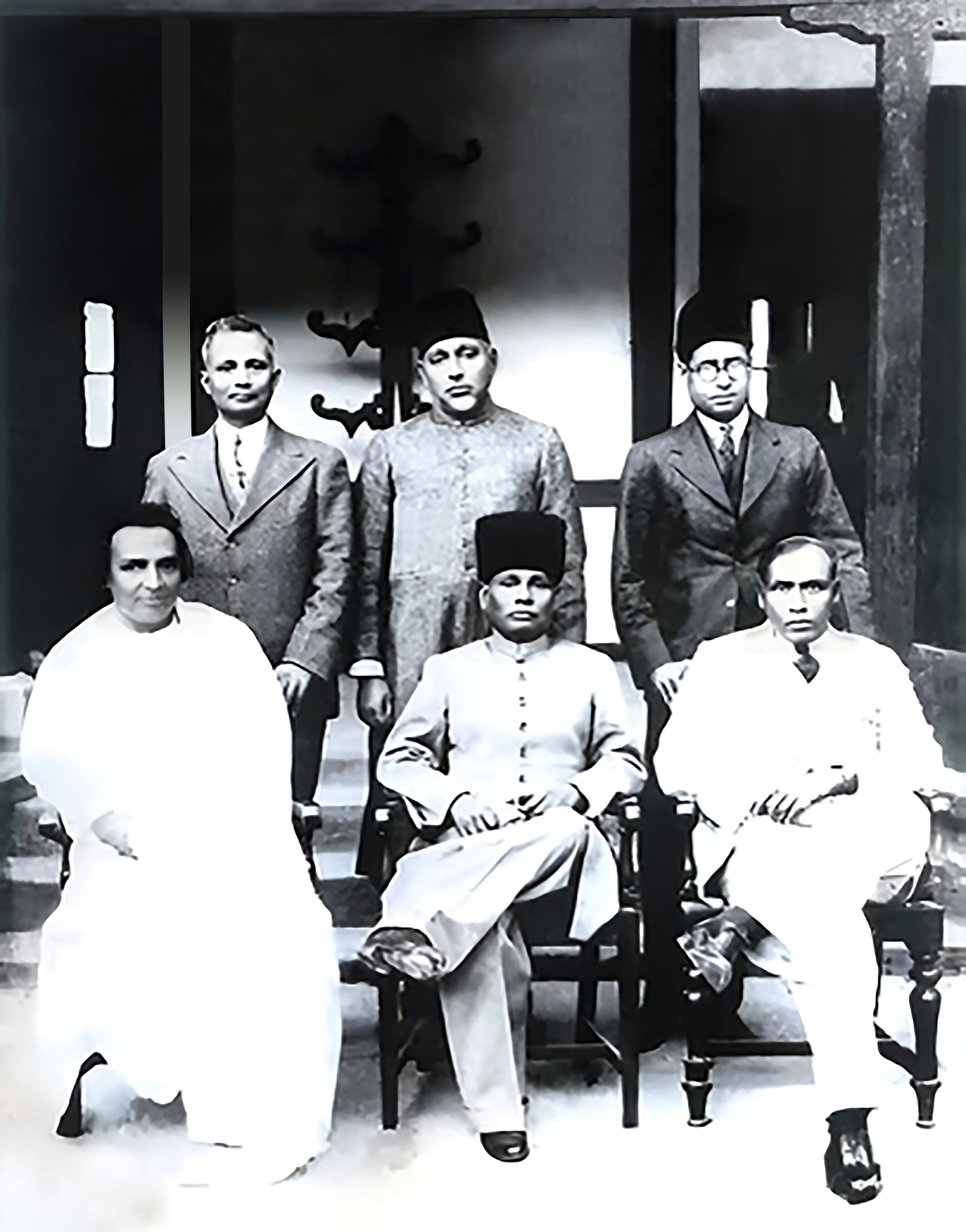
Swearing-in of 2nd Coalition Saadulluh Ministry at Shillong. Standing (l to r) J.J.M. Nichols-Roy, Syed Sir Mohammad Saadullah, Abdul Matin Chaudhury. Seated (l to r) Rohini Kumar Choudhury, Munawar Ali, Akshay Kumar Das.

The second coalition cabinet lasted from 5 February 1938 to 18 September 1938. There were no Parliamentary Secretaries.

Name	Portfolios	Party
Muhammed Saadulah Prime Minister	Finance; Home; Public Works	All-India Muslim league
Cabinet Ministers
James Joy Mohan Nichols Roy	Local self-government; Medicine	Progressive Party (Assam)
Rohini Kumar Chaudhuri	Revenue; Forest	Hindu People's Party
Munawwar Ali	Education; Excise	All-India Muslim league
Abdul Martin Choudhury	Agriculture; Industries; Cooperative societies; Judicial	All-India Muslim league
Akshay Kumar Das	Registration; Legislative; General department; Hindu; Kaibartta (scheduled caste)	Constitutionalist
