= Political families of Assam =

List of Indian political families based in Assam

This article is a list of political families in the Indian state of Assam.

== Ajmal family ==
- Badruddin Ajmal — Member of Parliament, Lok Sabha (2009–2024), Member of Assam Legislative Assembly (2006–2009)
  - Abdur Rahman Ajmal (son of Badruddin) — Member of Assam Legislative Assembly (2011–2016)
  - Abdur Rahim Ajmal (son of Badruddin) — Member of Assam Legislative Assembly (2014–2021)
- Sirajuddin Ajmal (brother of Badruddin) — Member of Assam Legislative Assembly (2021–present), Member of Parliament, Lok Sabha (2014–2019)

== Borbora—Bora family ==
- Golap Borbora — 6th Chief Minister of Assam (1978–1979), Member of Parliament, Rajya Sabha (1968–1974), Member of Assam Legislative Assembly (1978–1983)
  - Sibamoni Bora (daughter-in-law of Golap)— Member of Assam Legislative Assembly (2021–2026)
- Kiran Bora (father of Sibamoni) — Member of Assam Legislative Assembly (1983–1985)

== Bordoloi family ==
- Gopinath Bordoloi — 1st Chief Minister of Assam (1950)
  - Robin Bordoloi (son of Gopinath) — Minister of State, Member of Assam Legislative Assembly (2001–2016)

== Barman family ==
- Bhumidhar Barman — 12th Chief Minister of Assam (1996), Cabinet Minister (1973–1978, 1991–1996, 2001–2016), Member of Assam Legislative Assembly (1973–1978, 1991–1996, 2001–2016)
  - Diganta Barman (son of Bhumidhar) — Member of Assam Legislative Assembly (2021–2026)

== Bhattacharyya family ==
- Gaurishankar Bhattacharyya — Leader of the Opposition, Member of Assam Legislative Assembly (1952–1962)
  - Siddhartha Bhattacharya (son of Gaurishankar) — Minister of Law and Justice (2018–2021), Member of Assam Legislative Assembly (2016–present)

== Chakravarty family ==
- Bijoya Chakravarty — Union Minister of State for Water Resources (1999–2004), Member of Parliament, Lok Sabha (1999–2004, 2009–2019), Member of Parliament, Rajya Sabha (1986–1992)
  - Suman Haripriya (daughter of Bijoya) — Member of Assam Legislative Assembly (2016–present)

== Choudhury family ==
- Phani Bhusan Choudhury — Member of Parliament, Lok Sabha (2024–present), Minister for Food (2018–2021), Member of Assam Legislative Assembly (1985–2024)
- Diptimayee Choudhury (wife of Phani) — Member of Assam Legislative Assembly (2024–present)

== Chaudhuri family ==
- Rohini Kumar Chaudhuri — Cabinet Minister, Member of Parliament, Lok Sabha (1952–1955), Member of Assam Legislative Assembly
  - Prabin Kumar Chaudhuri (son of Rohini) — Minister for Transport, Printing, Stationery, Tourism and Veterinary (1970–1972), Minister of State for Transport and Parliamentary Affairs (1967–1970), Member of Assam Legislative Assembly (1962–1975)

== Das family ==
- Omeo Kumar Das — Cabinet Minister (1947–1957), Member of Assam Legislative Assembly (1937–1967)
- Pushpalata Das (wife of Omeo) — Member of Parliament, Rajya Sabha (1951–1961), Member of Assam Legislative Assembly (1967–1972)

== Das—Neog family ==
- Rebati Das — Member of Assam Legislative Assembly (1972–1978)
  - Ajanta Neog (daughter of Rebati) — Minister of Finance (2021–present), Minister of Law (2015–2016), Minister of Jails (2006–2008), Member of Assam Legislative Assembly (1996–2020, 2021–present)
  - Nagen Neog (husband of Ajanta) — Minister for Rural Development, Member of Assam Legislative Assembly (1983–1985, 1991–1996)

== Dev family ==
- Santosh Mohan Dev — Minister of Heavy Industries and Public Enterprises (2005–2008), Member of Parliament, Lok Sabha (1980–1998, 1999–2009)
- Bithika Dev (wife of Santosh) — Member of Assam Legislative Assembly (2006–2011)
  - Sushmita Dev (daughter of Santosh and Bithika) — Member of Parliament, Rajya Sabha (2021–2023, 2024–present), Member of Parliament, Lok Sabha (2014–2019), Member of Assam Legislative Assembly (2011–2014)

== Goala family ==
- Dinesh Prasad Goala — Member of Assam Legislative Assembly (1983–2014)
  - Rajdeep Goala — Member of Assam Legislative Assembly (2014–2021)

== Gogoi family (Girindra Nath) ==
- Girindra Nath Gogoi — Minister of State (Independent Charge) (1957–1962), Member of Assam Legislative Assembly (1951–1967)
  - Pranab Kumar Gogoi (son of Girindra Nath)— Speaker of Assam Legislative Assembly (1991–1992), Member of Assam Legislative Assembly (2001–2020)

== Gogoi family (Jiba Kanta) ==
- Jiba Kanta Gogoi — Speaker of Assam Legislative Assembly (1991–1992), Minister of Finance (1992–1996), Member of Assam Legislative Assembly (1983–1985, 1991–1996, 2001–2001)
  - Bismita Gogoi (daughter-in-law of Jiba Kanta) — Minister of State (Independent Charge) for Cultural Affairs (2011–2016), Member of Assam Legislative Assembly (2011–2016)

== Gogoi family (Tarun) ==
- Tarun Gogoi — 13th Chief Minister of Assam (2001–2016), Member of Parliament, Lok Sabha from Assam (1971–1984, 1991–1996, 1998–2001), Member of Assam Legislative Assembly (1996–1998, 2001–2020)
  - Gaurav Gogoi (son of Tarun) — Deputy Leader of the Opposition in Lok Sabha (2024–present), Member of Parliament, Lok Sabha (2014–present)
- Dip Gogoi (brother of Tarun) — Member of Assam Legislative Assembly (2001–2001), Member of Parliament, Lok Sabha (2002–2014)

== Gohain—Gogoi family ==
- Jogesh Chandra Gohain — Member of Assam Legislative Assembly (1937–1944)
- Padma Kumari Gohain (wife of Jogesh) — Minister for Social Welfare, Sericulture and Weaving (1970–1972), Member of Assam Legislative Assembly (1957–1972)
  - Keshab Chandra Gogoi (son-in-law of Jogesh and Padma) — 9th Chief Minister of Assam (1982), Cabinet Minister (1978–1979, 1979–1981, 1983–1985, 1991), Member of Assam Legislative Assembly (1978–1996)
    - Ranjan Gogoi (son of Kesab) — 46th Chief Justice of India (2018–2019), Member of Parliament, Rajya Sabha (2020–2026)

== Hoque Choudhury family ==
- Moinul Hoque Choudhury — Union Minister of Commerce and Industrial Development (1971–1972), Member of Parliament, Lok Sabha (1971–1976), Member of Assam Legislative Assembly (1952–1971)
- Rashida Haque Choudhury (wife of Moinul) — Union Minister of State for Social Welfare (1979–1980), Member of Parliament, Lok Sabha (1977–1979)
- Nurul Haque Choudhury (brother of Moinul) — Member of Assam Legislative Assembly (1972–1978, 1983–1985)

== Islam family ==
- Zahirul Islam — Minister for Municipal administration and Community development, Member of Assam Legislative Assembly (1962–1972, 1978–1985, 1991–1996)
- Hosenara Islam (wife of Zahirul) — Member of Assam Legislative Assembly (2001–2006)
  - Zabed Islam (son of Zahirul and Hosenara) — Member of Assam Legislative Assembly (2011–2016)

== Kurmi family ==
- Rupam Kurmi — Minister for Employment and Craftsmanship (2001–2004), Member of Assam Legislative Assembly (1991–2004)
  - Rupjyoti Kurmi (son of Rupam) — Member of Assam Legislative Assembly (2006–present)

== Mahanta family ==
- Prafulla Kumar Mahanta — 11th Chief Minister of Assam (1985–1990, 1996–2001), 1st Governor of Mizoram (1987–1989), Member of Assam Legislative Assembly (1985–2021)
- Joyasree Goswami Mahanta (wife of Prafulla)— Member of Parliament, Rajya Sabha (1999–2001)

== Narah family ==
- Bharat Narah — Cabinet Minister (1985–1990, 1995–1996, 2001–2011, 2012–2016), Member of Assam Legislative Assembly (1985–2011, 2021–present)
- Ranee Narah (wife of Bharat) — Union Minister of State of Tribal Affairs (2012–2014), Member of Parliament, Rajya Sabha (2016–2022), Member of Parliament, Lok Sabha (1998–2004, 2009–2014)

== Nazrul family ==
- Nazrul Islam — Cabinet Minister (2002–2016), Member of Assam Legislative Assembly (1996–2021)
  - Asif Mohammad Nazar — Member of Assam Legislative Assembly (2021–present)

== Purkayastha family ==
- Kabindra Purkayastha — Minister of State for Communications (1998–1999), Member of Parliament, Lok Sabha (1991–1996, 1998–1999, 2009–2014)
  - Kanad Purkayastha (son of Kabindra) — Member of Parliament, Rajya Sabha (2025–present)

== Rajkhowa family ==
- Lalit Chandra Rajkhowa — Minister for Food (1985–1990), Member of Assam Legislative Assembly (1985–1991)
- Renupoma Rajkhowa (wife of Lalit)— Deputy Speaker of Assam Legislative Assembly (1999–2001), Member of Assam Legislative Assembly (1991–2001, 2016–present)

== Roy family ==
- Santosh Kumar Roy — Member of Assam Legislative Assembly (1972–1978)
  - Gautam Roy (son Santosh) — Minister of Social Welfare (2001–2005, 2015–2016), Member of Assam Legislative Assembly (1985–2016)
  - Mandira Roy (wife of Gautam) — Member of Assam Legislative Assembly (2013–2016)
    - Rahul Roy (son of Gautam and Mandira) — Member of Assam Legislative Assembly (2006–2011)

== Saikia—Gogoi family ==
- Hiteswar Saikia — 10th Chief Minister of Assam (1983–1985, 1991–1996), 1st Governor of Mizoram (1987–1989), Member of Assam Legislative Assembly (1972–1988)
- Hemoprova Saikia — (wife of Hiteswar)— Minister for Sericulture, Handloom, and Textiles (2001–2006), Member of Assam Legislative Assembly (1996–2006)
  - Debabrata Saikia (son of Hiteswar and Hemoprova) — Leader of the Opposition (2021–2026), Member of Assam Legislative Assembly (2011–2026)
- Membor Gogoi (brother-in-law of Hiteswar) — Member of Assam Legislative Assembly (2001–2016)

== Sarkar family ==
- Chandan Kumar Sarkar — Minister for Irrigation and Soil Conservation (2015–2016), Member of Assam Legislative Assembly (1991–1996, 2001–2006, 2011–2016)
  - Pradip Sarkar (son of Chandan) — Member of Assam Legislative Assembly (2021–present)

== Sarma family (Nagen) ==
- Nagen Sarma — Minister for the Public Works Department, Member of Assam Legislative Assembly (1985–2000)
- Alaka Sarma (wife of Nagen) — Member of Assam Legislative Assembly (2001–2001, 2006–2011)

== Sarma family (Mukut) ==
- Mukut Sarma — Cabinet Minister, Member of Assam Legislative Assembly (1978–1985, 1991–1996)
  - Rupak Sarma (nephew of Mukut)— Member of Assam Legislative Assembly (2016–present)

== Tirkey family ==
- Aklius Tirkey — Member of Assam Legislative Assembly (1978–1983, 2001–2006, 2011–2016)
  - Roselina Tirkey (daughter of Atlius) — Member of Assam Legislative Assembly (2016–2021)

== See also ==
- Political families of India
