= 1937 Assam Legislative Assembly election =

1937 provincial election in British India

- January 1937

All 108 seats to the Assam Legislative Assembly 55 seats needed for a majority
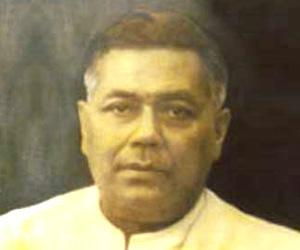
	First party
Leader	Gopinath Bordoloi
Party	INC
Last election	New
Seats won	32
Prime Minister before election
Office established
Prime Minister of Assam
Muhammed Saadulah
Independent

The first elections for the Assam Legislative Assembly were held in 1937 as mandated by the Government of India Act 1935.

== History ==
After the implementation of the Government of India Act 1935 and the 1937 Indian provincial elections, the Indian National Congress won 32 out of the 108 seats in the newly formed Assam Legislative Assembly and formed the largest party. The party had a non-acceptance policy on forming a ministry was a Congress policy, and Muhammed Saadulah subsequently formed a coalition ministry instead.

== Results ==
Party	Seats won
Indian National Congress	32
Muslim Independents	30
Non-Congress Hindus	9
All-India Muslim League	4
No party affiliation	33
Total	108

== Elected members ==
Constituency	Member
Kamrup (South)	Muhammad Saadulla
Sylhet Sadar (Central)	Abu Nasr Muhammad Waheed
Shillong (Backward class)	J. J. M. Nichols-Ray
Kamrup Sadar (South)	Rohini Chaudhuri
South Sylhet (East)	Muhammad Ali Haidar Khan
Dhubri (North General)	Kumar Ajit Narayan Dev
Sunamganj (Reserved)	Akshay Kumar Das
Silchar (General)	Arun Kumar Chanda
Surma Valley Indian Planting	Baidyanath Mookherjee
Sylhet Sadar (South)	Basanta Kumar Das
Kamrup Sadar (South Reserved)	Beliram Das
Sibsagar	Bhuban Chandra Gogoi
Habiganj (North Reserved)	Bipin Behari Das
Mangaldai (South Reserved)	Bipin Chandra Medhi
South Sylhet (West)	Dakshinaranjan Gupta Chaudhuri
Jorhat (North General)	Debeswar Sharmah
Barpeta (South General)	Ghanasyam Das
Nalbari (General)	Gauri Kanta Talukdar
Kamrup Sadar (South)	Gopinath Bordoloi
Nowgong (General West)	Haladhar Bhuyan
Sylhet Sadar (North)	Harendra Narayan Chaudhury
Hailakandi (General)	Hitendra Chandra Chakravarty
Sibsagar (East General)	Jadav Prasad Chaliha
Dhubri (Central General)	Jogendra Narayan Mandal
Goalpara (South-East General)	Jogendra Chandra Nath
Kamrup Sadar (Central General)	Jogendra Nath Barua
Dibrugarh (West General)	Jogesh Chandra Gohain
Silchar (Reserved)	Kalachand Roy
Barpeta (North General)	Kameswar Das
Karimganj (East General)	Kamini Kumar Sen
Sunamganj (General)	Karuna Sindhu Roy
Indian Commerce and Industry	Kedarmal Brahmin
Jorhat (South General)	Krishna Nath Sarma
Karimganj (West General)	Khirode Chandra Deb
Dibrugarh (Central General)	Laksheswar Borooah
South Sylhet (East)	Lalit Mohan Kar
Tezpur (East General)	Mahadev Sarma
Nowgong (General)	Mohendra Nath Saikia
Nowgong (General South)	Mahi Chandra Bora
Assam Valley Indian Planting	Naba Kumar Dutta
Tezpur (West General)	Omeo Kumar Das
Goalpara (North-West General)	Paramananda Das
Habiganj (South)	Promode Chandra Dutta
Mangaldai (South General)	Purandar Sarma
Nowgong (General)	Purna Chandra Sarma
Dibrugarh (East General)	Rajani Kanta Baruah
Golaghat (North)	Rajendra Nath Baruah
Jorhat (North General/Reserved)	Ramnath Das
Golaghat (South General)	Sankar Chandra Barua
Dhubri (South)	Santosh Kumar Barua
North Lakhimpur (General)	Sarbeswar Barua
Habiganj (North)	Shibendra Chandra Biswas
Kamrup Sadar (North General)	Siddhi Nath Sarma
South Sylhet (Central)	Abdul Aziz
Sunamganj (South Muhammadan)	Abdul Bari Choudhury
Dhubri (South)	Abdul Hamid Khan
Karimganj (Central Muhammadan)	Hazi Abdul Majid Choudhury
Sylhet Sadar (East)	Abdul Matin Choudhury
Habiganj (South-East)	Abdur Rahman
Barpeta (Muhammadan)	Sayed Abdul Rouf
Sylhet Sadar (North)	Md. Abdus Salam
Sunamganj (East)	Dewan Muhammad
Habiganj (North-West)	Dewan Ali Raja
Goalpara (East)	Mohammad Amjad Ali
Nowgong (East Muhammadan)	Mohammad Amiruddin
Habiganj (South-East)	Ashrafuddin Md. Choudhury
Darrang (Muhammadan)	Badaruddin Ahmed
Sylhet Sadar (West)	Dewan Eclimur Roza Choudhury
Kamrup (North)	Fakhruddin Ali Ahmed
Dhubri (West)	Ghyasuddin Ahmed
Dhubri (North Muhammadan)	Jhanuddin Ahmed
Sibsagar (Muhammadan)	Keramet Ali
Goalpara (West)	Matior Rahman Mia
Sunamganj (West)	Muhammad Maqbul Hussain Choudhury
Sibsagar (Muhammadan)	Mahamud Ali
Karimganj (West Muhammadan)	Mabarak Ali
Habiganj (North-East)	Mudabbir Hussain Choudhury
Sylhet Sadar (South)	Mafizur Rahman
Sunamganj (Central Muhammadan)	Munawwar Ali
Hailakandi (Muhammadan)	Muzarrof Ali Laskar
Silchar (Muhammadan)	Aanwar Ali Barbhuiya
South Sylhet (West)	Naziruddin Ahmed
Nowgong (Muhammadan)	Sheikh Osman Ali Sadagar
Lakhipur (Muhammadan)	Sayidur Rahman
European Planting	A. B. Beddow
European Planting	A. F. Bendall
European Planting	J. R. Clayton
European Commerce and Industry	W. R. Faull
European	W. Fleming
European Planting	L. J. Godwin
European Planting	D. B. H. Moore
European Planting	R. A. Palmer
Women's (Shillong)	Mavis Dunn
Garo Hills (North)	Benjamin Chandra Momin
Jorhat (Labour)	Bhairab Chandra Das
Doom Dooma (East Labour)	Bideshi Pan Tanti
Thakurbari	Binode Kumar J. Sarwan
Nowgong (Tribal)	Dhirsing Deuri
Jowai (Backward Area)	L. Gotphoh
Indian Christian	C. Goldsmith
Garo Hills (North)	Jobang D. Marak
Lakhimpur (Tribal)	Karka Dalay Miri
Mikir Hills	Khorsing Terang
Silchar (Labour)	P. Parida
Kamrup Backward Tribal (Plains)	Rabi Chandra Kachari
Goalpara (Tribal)	Rupnath Brahma
Karimganj (East Reserved General)	Balaram Sirkar
European Planting	F. W. Hockenhull
