= Mahendra Mohan Choudhry ministry =

1970 cabinet in the Indian state of Assam

- Date formed: 11 November 1970
- Date dissolved: 31 January 1972

People and organisations
- Governor: Braj Kumar Nehru
- Chief Minister: Mahendra Mohan Choudhry
- Member parties: INC
- Opposition party: AHL

History
- Predecessor: Chaliha III
- Successor: Sinha ministry

The Mahendra Mohan Choudhry ministry was the Cabinet of Assam headed by Chief Minister of Assam Mahendra Mohan Choudhry. The Ministry lasted from 11 November 1970 to 31 January 1972.

== Ministers ==
=== Cabinet ===
Name	Portfolios	Constituency	Party
Mahendra Mohan Choudhry Chief Minister	Appointments; Home; Political; General Administration; Secretariat; Statistics; Minority Affairs; Education; Elections; Flood Control; Irrigation; Students; Youth Welfare; General coordination; Any other portfolio not allocated to other ministers	Gauhati East	INC
Cabinet Ministers
Kamakhya Prasad Tripathy	Finance; Planning; Development; Town and country planning; Information; Public relations	Biswanath	INC
Biswadev Sarma	Power; Mines and Minerals; Industries (including Cottage industries)	Balipara	INC
Lakshmi Prasad Goswami	Revenue	Jamunamukh	INC
Mohendra Nath Hazarika	Jails; Khadi and Village industries; Fisheries; Political sufferers	Bokani	INC
Ramesh Chandra Barooah	Supply; Excise; Trade and commerce; Municipal administration	Dibrugarh	INC
Chatrasing Teron	Health; Family planning	Howraghat	INC
Joy Bhadra Hagjer	Tribal areas’ development; Cultural affairs	Haflong	INC
Altaf Hussain Mazumdar	Public Works Department (Buildings and Roads)	Barkhola	INC
Ataur Rahman	Agriculture; Livestock; Panchayats and community development; Parliamentary affairs	Chenga	INC
Padma Kumari Gohain	Social Welfare; Sericulture; Weaving	Moran	INC
Prabin Kumar Choudhury	Transport; Printing; Stationery; Tourism; Veterinary	Boko	INC
Ranendra Basumatari	Forests; Backward Classes	Udalguri	INC
A. Thanglura	Social conservation; Registration; Stamps	Aijal West	INC
Syed ahmed Ali	Flood control; Irrigation and Wakfs	Dhubri	INC
Jogen Saikia	Relief and rehabilitation; Law; Cooperation; Municipal administration	Jorhat	INC

=== Junior ===
Ministers of State
Devendra Nath Hazarika	Saikhowa	INC
Syed ahmed Ali	Dhubri	INC
Chatra Gopal Karmakar	Sarupathar	INC
Durgeswar Saikia	Thowra	INC
Paramananda Gogoi	Tinsukia	INC
Jagannath Singha	Udharbond	INC
Sadhan Ranjan Sarkar	Lumding	INC
Sarat Goswami	Raha	INC
Deputy Ministers
Golak Chandra Patgiri	Bijni	INC
Dandi Ram Dutta	Kalaigaon	INC
Sai Sai Terang	Bokajan	INC
