= First Bordoloi ministry (Assam Province) =

1938 cabinet in the Indian state of Assam

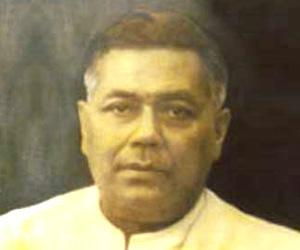
- Date formed: 19 September 1938
- Date dissolved: 17 November 1939

People and organisations
- Governor: Henry Joseph Twynam; Robert Reid
- Prime Minister: Gopinath Bordoloi
- Member parties: INC

History
- Predecessor: Saadulah I
- Successor: Saadulah II

The First Bordoloi provincial government, was the Cabinet of Assam Province headed by Prime Minister of Assam Gopinath Bordoloi. The government lasted from 19 September 1938 to 17 November 1939.

== History ==
Following the resignation of the Saadulah government, the Congress-coalition Bordoloi government was formed. However, following the outbreak of the Second World War, which Congress refused to be a part of, the government resigned.

== Ministers ==
=== Cabinet ===
Name	Portfolios	Party
Gopinath Bordoloi Premier	Home; Education	INC
Cabinet Ministers
Akshay Kumar Das	Excise; Agriculture	INC
Ram Nath Das	Public Health; Medical	INC
Kamini Kumar Sen	Local self-government; Judicial; General	INC
Rupnath Brahma	Forests; Registration	INC
Fakhruddin Ali Ahmed	Finance; Revenue	INC
Mahmud Ali	Cooperation; Industries	INC
Ali Haidur Khan	Public Works	INC
