= Third Chaliha ministry =

1967 cabinet in the Indian state of Assam

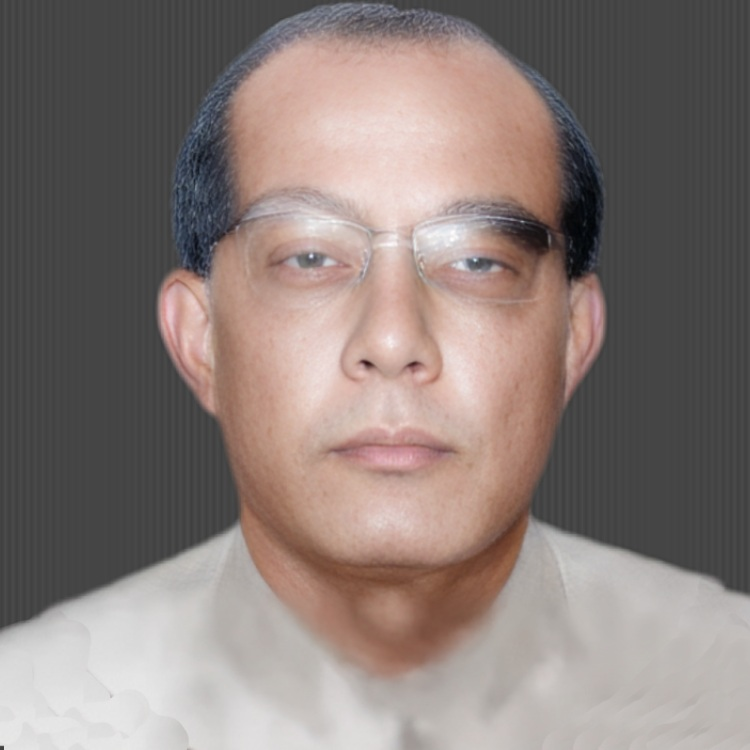
- Date formed: 16 March 1967
- Date dissolved: 11 November 1970

People and organisations
- Governor: Vishnu Sahay; Braj Kumar Nehru
- Chief Minister: Bimala Prasad Chaliha
- Member parties: INC
- Opposition party: AHL

History
- Election: 1967
- Predecessor: Chaliha II
- Successor: Choudhry ministry

The Third Chaliha ministry was the Cabinet of Assam headed by Chief Minister of Assam Bimala Prasad Chaliha. The Ministry lasted from 1967 to 11 November 1970.

== Ministers ==
=== Cabinet ===
Name	Portfolios	Constituency	Party
Bimala Prasad Chaliha Chief Minister	Home; Political; General Administration; Secretariat Administration; Information and Public Relations; Minority Affairs; Tourism; Town and Country Planning; Municipal Administration; Transport; Statistics; Other portfolios not allocated to other ministers	Sonari	INC
Cabinet Ministers
Kamakhya Prasad Tripathy	Finance; Labour	Biswanath	INC
Biswadev Sarma	Power (Electricity); Mines and Minerals; Industries (and Cottage industries)	Balipara	INC
Chatrasing Teron	Tribal areas; Backward classes; Soil conservation	Howraghat	INC
Joy Bhadra Hagjer	Education	Haflong	INC
Mahendra Mohan Choudhry	Revenue; Forests; Flood control; Irrigation; Parliamentary Affairs	Gauhati East	INC
Ramesh Chandra Barooah	Supply; Excise; Trade and commerce	Dibrugarh	INC
Lakshmi Prasad Goswami	Agriculture; Veterinary and Livestock; Panchayat (including development and cooperation)	Jamunamukh	INC
Satindra Mohon Dev	Health; Relief and Rehabilitation; Registration and stamps; Printing and stationery	Silchar	INC
Mohendra Nath Hazarika	Jails; Khadi and village industries; Sericulture and weaving; Fisheries	Bokani	INC
Abdul Matlib Mazumdar	Law; Political sufferers; Social Welfare	Hailakandi	INC
Ministers of State
Syed Ahmed Ali	Education; Wakf property	Dhubri	INC
Padma Kumari Gohain	Social Welfare; Relief; Rehabilitation	Moran	INC
Prabin Kumar Choudhury	Transport; Parliamentary Affairs	Boko	INC
Devendra Nath Hazarika	Community development; Panchayat	Saikhowa	INC
Altaf Hussain Mazumdar	Public Works (roads and buildings) Department	Barkhola	INC
Ranendra Basumatari	Revenue; Forests; Welfare of Backward Classes	Udalguri	INC
Deputy Ministers
Sai Sai Terang	Tribal Areas; Welfare of Backward Classes	Bokajan	INC
Dandi Ram Dutta	Agriculture; Flood control; Irrigation	Kalaigaon	INC
