= Michael Keane =

Michael or Mike Keane may refer to:

- Michael Keane (economist) (born 1961), American-born economist
- Michael Keane (footballer, born 1982), former Irish footballer
- Michael Keane (footballer, born 1993), English footballer
- Michael Keane (governor) (1874–1937), British colonial administrator in India
- Michael Keane (hurler) (1933–2002), Irish hurler
- Mike Keane (born 1967), retired Canadian ice hockey player
- Michael Keane, a video game character in Grand Theft Auto IV
- Michael Keane, per historical anecdote, a blind Irish harp player at Fort Oswego

== See also ==
- Michael Keen (disambiguation)
