= Jahan Uddin =

Jahan Uddin may refer to:

- Jahan Uddin (cricketer)
- Jahan Uddin (politician)
