= Anjan Gogoi =

Indian Air Force officer

Air Marshal Anjan Kumar Gogoi PVSM, VSM, AVSM
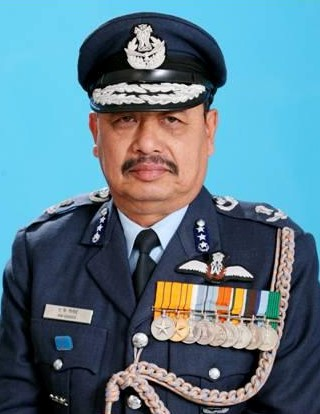

Member of the North Eastern Council
- In office 2020–2023
- Nominated by: Ram Nath Kovind

Air Officer Commanding-in-Chief South Western Air Command
- In office 1 January 2011 – 28 February 2013
- Chief of Air Staff: Pradeep Vasant Naik; Norman Anil Kumar Browne
- Preceded by: Dinesh Chandra Kumaria
- Succeeded by: Daljit Singh

Director General Air Operations
- In office 1 June 2009 – 31 December 2010
- Chief of Air Staff: Pradeep Vasant Naik
- Preceded by: Paramjit Singh Bhangu
- Succeeded by: Daljit Singh

Personal details
- Born: February 1953 (age 73) Dibrugarh, Assam, India
- Spouse: Leena Gogoi
- Children: 2
- Parents: Keshab Chandra Gogoi; Shanti Priya Gogoi
- Relatives: Ranjan Gogoi (brother); Padma Kumari Gohain (grandmother); Jogesh Chandra Gohain (grandfather)
- Education: Devi Ahilya Vishwavidyalaya
- Awards: Param Vishisht Seva Medal; Vishisht Seva Medal; Ati Vishisht Seva Medal

Military service
- Allegiance: India
- Branch/service: Indian Air Force
- Years of service: 2 June 1973 – 28 February 2013
- Rank: Air Marshal
- Commands: South Western Air Command; No. 108 Squadron
- Service number: 13382

Air Marshal Anjan Kumar Gogoi, PVSM, VSM, AVSM (born February 1953) is an Indian retired Air Force officer who served as Air Officer Commanding-in-Chief (AOC-in-C) of the South Western Air Command from 2011 to 2013 and as a Member of the North Eastern Council (NEC) from 2020 to 2023.

Born in Dibrugarh, Gogoi is the eldest son of former chief minister of Assam Keshab Chandra Gogoi. He attended Sainik School in Goalpara and the National Defence Academy. In 1973, he was commissioned into the Indian Air Force (IAF) a fighter-stream pilot. In a career that spanned nearly four decades, he held various command appointments, including of the No. 108 Squadron IAF from 1992 to 1994. He served as Station Commander of the 35 wing at Suratgarh from 1999 to 2001, during Operation Safed Sagar in the Kargil War.

Gogoi was promoted to Air Vice Marshal in 2006, and was the Assistant Chief of Air Staff (operations) from 2008 to 2009. He was promoted to Air Marshal in 2009, and served as Director General Air Operations 2009 to 2010. Gogoi served as the AOC-in-C of the South Western Air Command from 2011 until his retirement in 2013. After his retirement from the IAF, he was nominated to serve a term of three years as a member of the NEC in 2020.

== Early life and education ==
=== Birth and family background ===
Anjan Kumar Gogoi was born in February 1953 in Dibrugarh, the eldest child and first son of Keshab Chandra Gogoi and Shanti Priya Gogoi. His father, Keshab Chandra, was a politician and lawyer who served as Chief Minister of Assam in 1982. Gogoi has two younger brothers and two younger sisters: Ranjan, Nirjan, Indira, and Nandita. His younger brother, Ranjan, went on to serve as the 46th Chief Justice of India and as a member of the Rajya Sabha.

=== Education ===
During Gogoi's childhood, when both he and his younger brother Ranjan were old enough to go to school, their father Keshab Chandra Gogoi said only one of them could go to the Sainik School in Goalpara. As both brothers wished to go, Keshab Chandra Gogoi told them to decide via a coin toss. Anjan won the coin toss, and went to the Sainik School in 1964. Gogoi attended the 41st National Defence Academy as a cadet in December 1971.

Gogoi underwent the Air Combat Simulator Instructors Course in the United Kingdom, the Higher Command Course at Army War College in Mhow, and the Executive National Security Programme in South Africa. He earned a Master of Philosophy in Defence and Management Studies from Devi Ahilya Vishwavidyalaya.

== Air force career ==
=== Early career (1973–1998) ===
Gogoi was commissioned into the Indian Air Force on 2 June 1973 as a fighter-stream pilot. He later completed the Defence Services Staff College as a squadron leader on 25 November 1985 in Wellington. He was promoted to Wing commander on 1 June 1991. He then served as the Commander of the No. 108 Squadron IAF from 20 January 1992 to 3 January 1994 in Adampur. He was promoted to Group Captain on 9 August 1996, and was appointed the Command Air Defence Officer of the Eastern Air Command on 1 May 1998.

=== Later career (1999–2009) ===
Gogoi served as the Station Commander of the 35 wing at Suratgarh from 21 June 1999 to 2 May 2001, during Operation Safed Sagar in the Kargil War. He served as Air Officer Commanding of the 18 wing at Pathankot from 11 March 2002 to 2 November 2003. He was promoted to Air Commodore on 27 March 2002, and from 3 November 2003 to 31 October 2006, he served as the Principal Director of offensive operations at Air Headquarters in Delhi. He was promoted the Air Vice Marshal on 1 November 2006, and then was the Air Officer commanding of the 2 Air Defence Control Centre in Gandhinagar. He was then the Assistant Chief of Air Staff (operations) from 1 March 2008 to 31 May 2009.

=== Air Marshal (2009–2013) ===
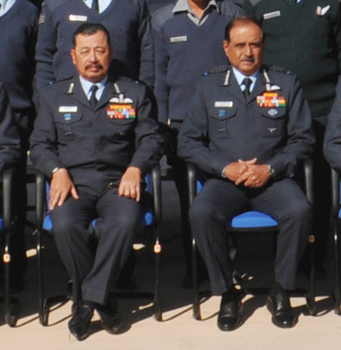
Gogoi (left) with Chief of the Air Staff N.A.K. Browne (right) on 7 January 2013.

Gogoi was promoted to Air Marshal on 1 June 2009, and was Director General Air Operations from 1 June 2009 to 31 December 2010. He lastly served as the Air Officer Commanding-in-Chief (AOC-in-C) of the South Western Air Command from 1 January 2011 until his retirement on 28 February 2013. During his tenure as AOC-in-C, honorary Group Captain and cricketeer Sachin Tendulkar was given permission to fly from Pune.

Gogoi is also a qualified flying instructor and fighter combat leader.

== Post-Air force career ==
=== Activities and roles ===
In retirement, Gogoi became President of the Socio Educational Welfare Association (SEWA), an NGO founded by his mother, after her retirement in 2016. He continued in the position until February 2021, when he was succeeded by his sister Nandita. (Note: Nandita became president of SEWA in March 2021.) He has since participated in events with the organisation, including its silver jubilee anniversary in 2025 with Arunachal Pradesh Governor Kaiwalya Trivikram Parnaik in Dibrugarh.

In a 2015 interview with Firstpost, Gogoi called for more than the two new Rafale squadrons, and argued that the dwindling number of IAF fighters was worrying.

=== NEC (2020–2023) ===
In January 2020, Gogoi was nominated a Member of the North Eastern Council (NEC) for a period of three years by the President of India. As NEC member, he participated in meetings with different stakeholders on Northeastern Tourism policy in February 2020, visited the North East Cane and Bamboo Development Council (NECBDC) office in December 2021, and visited the North Eastern Space Applications Centre in March 2022. He also briefed Union minister Jitendra Singh of the projects undertaken by the council in December 2020, and also accompanied Singh for the inauguration of the integrated bamboo treatment plant at the premises of the NECBDC.

== Personal life ==
Gogoi is married to Leena Gogoi, and together they have one son and one daughter.

Gogoi is a "keen golfer", and has interests in reading and in music.

== Honours and awards ==
Gogoi was awarded the Vishisht Seva Medal on 26 January 2002, and the Ati Vishisht Seva Medal on 26 January 2005.

Gogoi was awarded the Param Vishisht Seva Medal on 25 January 2012 on Republic Day for his "rendering service of the most exceptional order". He was presented the medal by President Pratibha Patil at Rashtrapati Bhavan on 17 April 2012.

Param Vishisht Seva Medal	Ati Vishisht Seva Medal	Vishisht Seva Medal

== See also ==
- List of serving marshals of the Indian Air Force
- Political families of Assam

Military offices
Preceded by Dinesh Chandra Kumaria	Director General Air Operations; 2009 - 2010	Succeeded by Daljit Singh
Preceded by Paramjit Singh Bhangu	Air Officer Commanding-in-Chief South Western Air Command; 2011 - 2013	Succeeded by Daljit Singh
