= Lakshmi Kanta Saikia =

Indian politician

Member of the Assam Legislative Assembly
- In office 1972–1978
- Preceded by: Dandi Ram Dutta
- Succeeded by: Nagen Sarma
- Constituency: Kalaigaon

Personal details
- Party: Indian National Congress

Lakshmi Kanta Saikia is an Indian politician. He was elected to the Assam Legislative Assembly from Kalaigaon in the 1972 Assam Legislative Assembly election as a member of the Indian National Congress.
