= Jogesh Chandra Gohain =

Indian politician (died 1944)

Member of Assam Legislative Assembly
- In office 1937–1944
- Constituency: Dibrugarh West

Personal details
- Died: 1944
- Party: Indian National Congress (until 1940)
- Spouse: Padma Kumari Gohain
- Children: 5, including Shanti Gogoi
- Relatives: Keshab Chandra Gogoi (son-in-law); Ranjan Gogoi (grandson); Anjan Gogoi (grandson)

Jogesh Chandra Gohain (died 1944), also referred to as Jogesh Chandra Borgohain, (Note: Contemporary sources refer to him as Jogesh Chandra Gohain, while later sources refer to him as Jogesh Chandra Borgohain.) was an Indian statesman who served as Member of Assam Legislative Assembly (MLA) for Dibrugarh West from 1937 until his death.

== Background ==
Gohain was described as an "Ahom elite", and obtained a Bachelor of Laws (BL) degree.

== Political career ==
Gohain was elected for the Indian National Congress as Member of Assam Legislative Assembly for Dibrugarh West in the 1937 election. As an MLA, Gohain along with Daulat Chandra Gohain, "repeatedly" asserted that the Ahoms were an "inseparable part" of Assamese society, and the upliftment of Ahoms would be beneficial for the society of Assam.

In 1940, Gohain resigned from the Congress party and subsequently acted as an independent member of the assembly supporting the cause of the Ahoms, specifically to support the demand of a "separate electorate" for the Ahoms.

== Family ==
Gohain was secondly married to Padma Kumari Gohain, who later became an MLA and cabinet minister. Together they had three sons and one daughter. Their only daughter, Shanti Gogoi, was married to Chief Minister Keshab Chandra Gogoi. Gohain's grandchildren included Air Marshal Anjan Gogoi, and the 46th Chief Justice of India, Ranjan Gogoi.

== Death ==
Gohain was a diabetic, and was suffering from a wound that did not heal. He was unable to secure a life-saving dose of penicillin as the stock in Dibrugarh had been diverted to help the army fighting in the Second World War, and died in 1944.

== See also ==
- Political families of Assam
