= Michael Keen =

Michael Keen may refer to:

- Michael John Keen (1935–1991), geoscientist
- Mike Keen (1940–2009), footballer

== See also ==
- Michael Keane (disambiguation)
