= Baby Begum =

Indian politician (born 1981)

Member of the Legislative Assembly (MLA) from Dhubri
- Incumbent
- Assumed office 2026
- Parliamentary group: Indian National Congress
- Constituency: Dhubri
- Majority: 68,661 votes

Baby Begum (born 1981) is an Indian politician from Assam. She is a Member of the Legislative Assembly from Dhubri Assembly constituency in Dhubri district representing the Indian National Congress.

== Early life and education ==
Begum is from Dhubri, Assam. She married Aynal Hoque, a cultivator. She studied arts at H.N. Seminary High School, Bagribari and passed the Class 12 examinations in 2002 under Assam Higher Secondary Education council. She runs her own business.

== Career ==
Begum became an MLA winning the 2026 Assam Legislative Assembly election from Dhubri Assembly constituency representing the Indian National Congress. She polled 1,18,362 votes and defeated her nearest rival, Nazrul Hoque of the All India United Democratic Front, by a margin of 68,661 votes.
