= Mahendra Mohan Rai Choudhury =

Indian politician

Mahendra Mohan Rai Choudhury is an Asom Gana Parishad politician from Assam. He was elected to the Assam Legislative Assembly in the 1985, 1996 and 2011 elections from the Kalaigaon constituency.
