= Prabin Kumar Chaudhuri =

Indian politician (1918–1975)

Minister for Transport, Printing, Stationery, Tourism and Veterinary
- In office 11 November 1970 – 31 January 1972
- Chief Minister: Mahendra Mohan Choudhry

Minister of State for Transport and Parliamentary Affairs
- In office 1967 – 1970
- Chief Minister: Bimala Prasad Chaliha

Member of Assam Legislative Assembly
- In office 1962 – 16 November 1975
- Preceded by: Radha Charan Choudhury
- Succeeded by: Umesh Chandra Das
- Constituency: Boko

Personal details
- Born: 6 August 1918
- Died: 16 November 1975 (aged 57)
- Party: Indian National Congress
- Parent: Rohini Kumar Chaudhuri (father)
- Occupation: Politician

Prabin Kumar Chaudhuri (6 August 1918 – 16 November 1975) was an Indian politician who served as Minister for Transport, Printing, Stationery, Tourism and Veterinary from 1970 to 1972. He previously served as Minister of State for Transport and Parliamentary Affairs from 1967 to 1970. He was the Member of Assam Legislative Assembly for Boko from 1962 until his death in 1975.

== Early life and education ==
Chaudhuri was born on 6 August 1918, the son of Congress leader Rohini Kumar Chaudhuri. He was educated in Gauhati and Shillong.

== Political career ==
Chaudhuri was elected for Boko in the 1962 election. He was appointed Minister of State for Transport and Parliamentary Affairs in the Third Chaliha ministry. He later was promoted to the cabinet as Minister for Transport, Printing, Stationery, Tourism and Veterinary, and served in the position from 1970 to 1972.

== Death ==
Chaudhuri died on 16 November 1975 at the age of 57.
