= Padma Kumari Gohain =

Indian stateswoman (1913–1987)

Minister for Social Welfare, Sericulture and Weaving
- In office 11 November 1970 – 31 January 1972
- Chief Minister: Mahendra Mohan Choudhry
- Preceded by: Abdul Matlib Mazumdar
- Succeeded by: Uttam Chandra Brahma

Minister of State for Social Welfare, Relief and Rehabilitation
- In office 1967 – 1970
- Chief Minister: Bimala Prasad Chaliha

Member of Assam Legislative Assembly
- In office 1957 – 1972
- Preceded by: Ghana Kanta Gogoi
- Succeeded by: Tarun Chandra Chutia
- Constituency: Moran

Personal details
- Born: Padmavati Kumari Gohain; 24 February 1913 Shillong, Assam, India
- Died: 1987 (aged 74)
- Party: Indian National Congress
- Other political affiliations: Independent
- Spouse: Jogesh Chandra Gohain (died 1944)
- Children: 4, including Shanti Gogoi
- Parents: Siddheswar Gohain (father); Subhadra Aideau (mother)
- Relatives: Rajeswar Singha (fourth great-grandfather); Keshab Chandra Gogoi (son-in-law); Ranjan Gogoi (grandson); Anjan Gogoi (grandson) Shrinjan Rajkumar Gohain (grandson)
- Occupation: Stateswoman; social worker; author

Padmavati Kumari Gohain (24 February 1913 – 1987) was an Indian stateswoman, social worker, writer, and descendant of the Ahom dynasty who served as Minister for Social Welfare, Sericulture and Weaving from 1970 to 1972. She previously served as Minister of State for Social Welfare, Relief and Rehabilitation from 1967 to 1970. A member of the Indian National Congress, she was the Member of Assam Legislative Assembly for Moran for three terms from 1957 to 1972.

Gohain was the first post-independence female cabinet minister in Assam, the only woman to contest every general election from 1946 to 1967, the first woman to contest for a general Assam assembly seat, (Note: In 1946, four other women contested for the seat reserved for women in Shillong. Gohain was the only woman to contest for a general seat, in Dibrugarh West) and one of the first female MLAs in Assam. She was the mother-in-law of Chief Minister Keshab Chandra Gogoi, and maternal grandmother of Chief Justice Ranjan Gogoi.

== Ancestry and family ==
Padma Kumari Gohain was the daughter of Siddheswar Gohain and Subhadra Aideau. Her father was the son of Srimat Gohain and grandson of Indunath Gohain, Sarumelia Raja. Indunath Gohain was the son of Bijoy Barmura Gohain, grandson of Ratneswar, Tipam Raja, and great-grandson of Ahom King Rajeswar Singha. This made Padma Kumari Gohain the fourth-great-granddaughter of King Rajeswar Singha. Her grandfather, Srimat, was also a first cousin of Ahom King Purandar Singha.

Gohain's brothers were Kumudeswar Gohain, Vice Principal of Moran High School, Sureswar Gohain, Director of Education in Assam and Nagaland, and Debaswar Gohain, an advocate. Her sister Nilopadmani was married to an excise superintendent, and her sister Purobala was married to an IPS officer.

== Early life and education ==
Padmavati Kumari Gohain was born on 24 February 1913 in Shillong. She received an education in the Tai language until matriculation level.

== Political career ==
Gohain began her political career by becoming the first female member of the Dibrugarh local board. She unsuccessfully contested the 1946 Assam election as an independent candidate for the Dibrugarh West constituency, having polled 839 votes out of 8,018. In 1951, she contested the Moran assembly constituency as the Indian National Congress candidate (Note: Some sources not that Gohain contested as an independent candidate until she was successfully elected. This article follows the Election India source which states she was the Congress candidate in 1951.) and received 7,955 votes, but was defeated by independent candidate Ghana Kanta Gogoi. In the 1957 Assam Legislative Assembly election, she was elected with 20,525 votes as the Congress MLA for Moran. She was reelected at the 1962 Assam Legislative Assembly election with 9,796 votes. At the 1967 Assam Legislative Assembly election, she won 9,037 votes and was reelected.

In 1967, Gohain was appointed Minister of State for Social Welfare, Relief and Rehabilitation in the third Chaliha ministry. In 1970, she was promoted to Cabinet as Minister for Social Welfare, Sericulture and Weaving under Mahendra Mohan Choudhry, serving until 1972. She left politics in the same year.

== Literary works ==
In 1935, Gohain published her work Madhuri, which was a collection of short stories. In 1952, she published her novel Hindu Nari.

== Personal life and death ==
Gohain married freedom fighter and politician Jogesh Chandra Gohain (died 1944), who was a MLC in the late 1930s. They had three sons and one daughter together. Their only daughter was social activist Shanti Gogoi, who married future Chief Minister of Assam Keshab Chandra Gogoi. Gohain was also the maternal grandmother of Chief Justice of India Ranjan Gogoi.

Gohain died in 1987, at the age of 74.
