= Dhruba Kumar Sen =

Indian politician

Dhruba Kumar Sen is a Bharatiya Janata Party politician from Assam, India. He created history by being elected in the Assam Legislative Assembly in 1991 from Dhubri constituency. He was the only BJP MLA in the Brahmaputra valley at that time. He was also the past 3 times president of Dhubri District. Till now he is the only MLA from Bharatiya Janata party in Dhubri constituency and one of the veteran leaders of BJP Assam Pradesh.
