= Shanti Gogoi =

Indian social activist and writer (1933–2021)

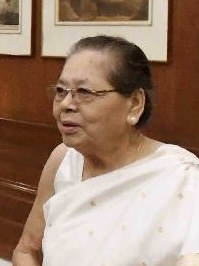
- Gogoi in 2018
- Born: Shanti Priya Gohain; 30 August 1933
- Died: 9 April 2021 (aged 87); New Delhi, India
- Occupations: Social worker; writer
- Known for: Social activism; founder of SEWA
- Spouse: Keshab Chandra Gogoi (m. 1951; died 1998)
- Children: Anjan; Ranjan; Nirjan; Indira; Nandita
- Parents: Jogesh Chandra Gohain; Padma Kumari Gohain

Shanti Priya Gogoi (née Gohain; 30 August 1933 (Note: Some sources note her year of birth as 1934. This article uses the year of birth corresponding to sources which mark her birth anniversary.) – 9 April 2021) was an Indian social activist and writer. She was the founder of the Socio Educational Welfare Association (SEWA), a non-governmental organisation aimed at helping marginalised communities, and served as its first president from 2000 to 2016. She authored numerous books, and served as the president of Sadou Asom Lekhika Samaroh Samiti.

== Early life ==
Gogoi was born on 30 August 1933, the only daughter of Jogesh Chandra Gohain and Padma Kumari Gohain. Her father was a Member of Assam Legislative Assembly, while her mother became a Member of Assam Legislative Assembly and later a cabinet minister. She had three brothers.

== Social work ==
Gogoi founded the Socio Educational Welfare Association (SEWA) in 2000, a non-governmental organisation, to facilitate the well-being of marginalised communities.

In 2020, during the COVID-19 pandemic, Gogoi donated ₹100,000 (US$1,000) to PM CARES Fund, a fund established by Prime Minister Narendra Modi to help fight the pandemic in India. She handed over the cheque to Dibrugarh deputy commissioner Pallav Ghopal Jha on 10 April.

== Literary work and awards ==
In 1999, she released her first book Jugma Jiwanar Huwaroni. This was followed by Europor Mitha Huworon in 2009, Padmakumari Gohainr Rosonahombhar in 2003, and Sintar Jilikoni in 2012. In 2013, she was awarded the Labanya Hazarika Adarsha Matri Award for her literary work.

In September 2018, Gogoi released her autobiography, Huworonir Rongin Paat, at a programme in Dibrugarh, which was unveiled by former Assam Sahitya Sabha president Nagen Saikia. Saikia described the book as a collection of "sweet memories" and true experiences of "past revel feelings" of Gogoi. Saikia also asserted that the book was devoid of "any exaggerations" and "pretensions".

Gogoi was also the president of Sadou Asom Lekhika Samaroh Samiti (a women's writer association), and an advisor to Mahila Samiti.

== Marriage and family ==
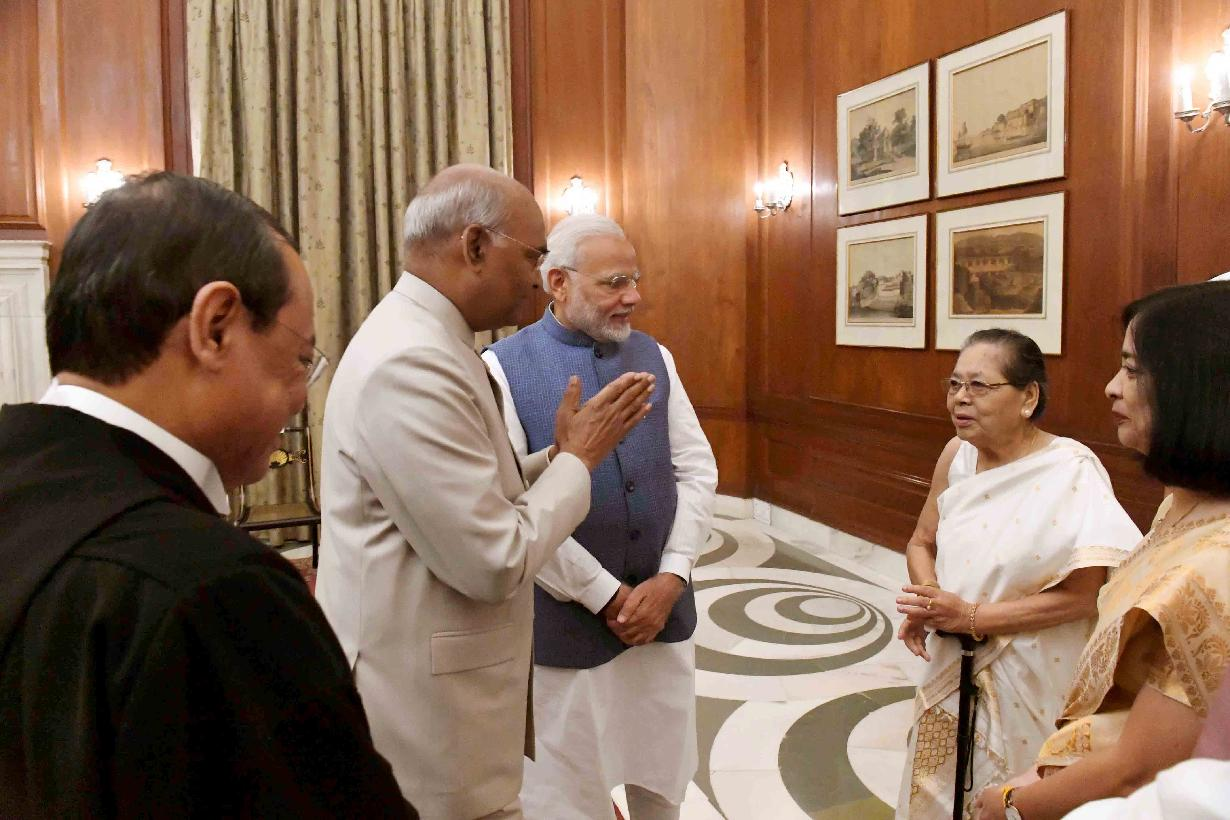
Gogoi with President Ram Nath Kovind, Prime Minister Narendra Modi, and daughter-in-law Rupanjali and her son Ranjan at his inauguration on 3 October 2018.

Gogoi married Keshab Chandra Gogoi in 1951, who was a politician and lawyer who later became Chief Minister of Assam. They remained married until his death in 1998. Together they had five children: Anjan, Ranjan, Nirjan, Indira, and Nandita. Anjan became an Air Marshal in the Indian Air Force, while Ranjan became the 46th chief justice of India. Her son Nirjan worked as a consultant urologist in the United Kingdom, while her daughters Indira and Nandita both served in the Assam Civil Service. Anjan succeeded Shanti Gogoi as president of SEWA in 2016, before Nandita became president in 2021.

== Death and funeral ==
Shanti Gogoi died in the early hours of the morning on 9 April in New Delhi on 9 April 2021. She had been undergoing treatment for illness at Escorts Hospital for several days prior. She was survived by her children and grandchildren. Chief Minister of Assam Sarbananda Sonowal visited her residence and offered floral tributes to her. Cabinet ministers Keshab Mahanta ahd Atul Bora also offered tributes to Gogoi.

Her mortal remains were brought to her Khalihamari residence in Dibrugarh on 9 April, where her son Ranjan carried out her last rites.

== Legacy ==
To mark her 88th birthday anniversary in August 2021, SEWA organised a covid-relief programme in Dibrugarh where multi-purpose financial assistance of ₹3,000 (US$31) was provided to covid affected families. The programme was attended by dignitaries including Gogoi's children Ranjan and Nandita, as well as writer Nagen Saikia. Partha Pratim Boriagi at the event described Gogoi as a "visionary" who worked towards the upliftment of the poor, while Dr Partha Ganguly described the initiatives she took for helping marginalised communities. Several other initiatives were undertaken by SEWA during the programme on her birth anniversary.

In August 2023, her 89th birth anniversary was observed in Dibrugarh. Her son, Ranjan, distributed food to students of Gabrupathar LP School, while a public meeting was held in Dibrugarh to commend the efforts of SEWA. Sudakhina Das delivered a speech on the contribution of Gogoi to the literary field and her social work.

On the silver jubilee anniversary of SEWA in 2025, Arunachal Pradesh Governor Kaiwalya Trivikram Parnaik paid tribute to Gogoi. Parnaik praised her vision and compassion, as well as her lifelong contribution to social reform and women's empowerment.
