= No. 108 Squadron IAF =

No. 108 Squadron
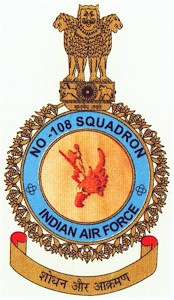
- Active: 20 November 1959–29 December 2017
- Country: Republic of India
- Branch: Indian Air Force
- Role: Fighter
- Garrison/HQ: Pathankot AFS
- Nickname: "Hawkeyes"
- Mottos: Shodan Aur Aakraman; Search and Strike

No. 108 Squadron (Hawkeyes) was a fighter squadron of Indian Air Force. The squadron was equipped with MiG-21M and was based at Pathankot Air Force Station. The squadron was number plated in December 2017.

== History ==
The Hawk, with its keen eyesight, symbolizes the search and acquisition of the target. The lightning and the battle axe denote an immediate response and the power of the strike. The Hawkeye squadron was formed on 20 November 1959 at Halwara. The squadron was initially equipped with Vampire aircraft and was assigned the role of Army Cooperation and photo-Reconnaissance.

The squadron was number plated in December 2017.

=== Assignments ===
- Liberation of Goa
- Indo-Pakistani War of 1965
- Indo-Pakistani War of 1971

== Aircraft ==
Aircraft types operated by the squadron:

| Aircraft type | From | To | Air base |
|---|---|---|---|
| de Havilland Vampire | December 1959 | December 1968 | AFS Halwara |
| Sukhoi Su-7 | December 1968 | July 1973 | |
| MiG-21 M | July 1973 | 29 December 2017 | AFS Adampur |

== Commanding officers ==
| From | To | Service number | Rank and name | Location | Photo |
|---|---|---|---|---|---|
| 07 Dec 59 | 15 Apr 62 | 3650 F(P) | Squadron Leader Keshava Prasad Misra | Halwara | |
| 16 May 62 | 12 May 65 | 3881 F(P) | Squadron Leader Robert Arnold Weir | Halwara/ Pathankot | |
| 13 May 65 | 26 May 65 | 4673 GD(P) | Squadron Leader Nuggehalli Krishnaswamy Ramprasad | Bagdogra | |
| 27 Jun 65 | 10 Dec 67 | 4582 F(P) | Squadron Leader Eric Lionel Allen | Pathankot/ Bagdogra/ | |
| 11 Dec 67 | 19 Nov 68 | 4608 F(P) | Squadron Leader Dilip Shankar Jog | Bareilly | |
| 20 Nov 68 | 16 Jul 72 | 4489 F(P) | Wing Commander Balchandra Shankar Deshmukh | Bareilly | |
| 17 Jul 72 | 21 May 73 | 4899 F(P) | Wing Commander Onkar Singh Wadhawan | Bareilly | |
| 22 May 73 | 17 Jul 75 | 4736 F(P) | Wing Commander Rajendra Kumar Dhawan | Adampur | |
| 18 Jul 75 | 05 Feb 76 | 5178 F(P) | Wing Commander Mohan Murdeshwar | Adampur | |
| 06 Feb 76 | 13 Jul 76 | 5060 F(P) | Wing Commander Thupakulu Narasimhulu Bhavani Shankar | Adampur | |
| 14 Jul 76 | 22 Oct 78 | 5596 F(P) | Wing Commander Viney Kapila | Adampur | |
| 23 Oct 78 | 14 Jan 80 | 6748 F(P) | Wing Commander Philip Rajkumar | Adampur | |
| 15 Jan 80 | 5 May 82 | 7415 F(P) | Wing Commander Kumarendra De | Adampur/ Bhatinda | |
| 6 May 82 | 28 Jun 82 | 8444 F(P) | Wing Commander Prabhat Chandra Prasad | Adampur | |
| 26 Jul 82 | 28 Feb 85 | 8186 F(P) | Wing Commander Ashley Malcolm Rodriques | Adampur | |
| 28 Feb 85 | 20 Apr 87 | 11296 F(P) | Wing Commander James Arun Benjamin | Adampur | |
| 28 Apr 87 | 01 Jan 88 | 11592 F(P) | Wing Commander Adhip Banerjee | Adampur | |
| 11 Jan 88 | 04 Jan 90 | 12218 F(P) | Wing Commander Ashok Vishwanath Bhagwat | Adampur | |
| 04 Jan 90 | 20 Jan 92 | 12403 F(P) | Wing Commander Kanwar Dalinderjit Singh | Adampur | |
| 20 Jan 92 | 03 Jan 94 | 13382 F(P) | Wing Commander Anjan Kumar Gogoi | Adampur | |
| 03 Jan 94 | 18 Sep 95 | 13911 F(P) | Wing Commander Motilal Nalluri | Adampur | |
| 18 Sep 95 | 24 Nov 97 | 15036 F(P) | Wing Commander Narinder Pal Singh | Adampur | |
| 24 Nov 97 | 10 Jan 00 | 15206 F(P) | Wing Commander Harjinder Jit Singh Jallawalla | Pathankot | |
| 10 Jan 00 | 15 Jul 02 | 16559 F(P) | Wing Commander Sanjeev Narayan Deshpande | Pathankot | |
| 15 Jul 02 | 27 Jun 04 | 17343 F(P) | Wing Commander Mohan Kumar Rao | Pathankot | |
| 28 Jun 04 | 13 Aug 06 | 18561 F(P) | Wing Commander Balkrishnan Balachandran | Pathankot | |
| 04 Aug 08 | 9 May 10 | 21505 F(P) | Wing Commander Ganapathiraju Srinivas | Bhuj/ Nal | |
| 22 Sep 14 | 03 Mar 16 | 23987 F(P) | Wing Commander Rahul Mathur | Nal | |
| 04 Mar 16 | 03 Jul 16 | 23987 F(P) | Group Captain Rahul Mathur | Nal | |
