= Rasul Hoque =

Indian political figure

MLA of Dhubri Vidhan Sabha Constituency
- In office 2006–2011
- Preceded by: Nazibul Umar
- Succeeded by: Jahan Uddin

Personal details
- Party: All India United Democratic Front

Rasul Hoque is an All India United Democratic Front politician from Assam, India. In 2006 he was elected as MLA of Dhubri Vidhan Sabha Constituency in Assam Legislative Assembly.
