= Najrul Hoque =

Indian politician

Member of Assam Legislative Assembly
- In office 2016–2026
- Preceded by: Jahan Uddin
- Succeeded by: Baby Begum
- Constituency: Dhubri

Personal details
- Born: 31 January 1970 (age 56) Sagolia, Assam
- Party: All India United Democratic Front

Najrul Hoque (Bengali: নজরুল হক, Bengali pronunciation: [nɔdʒrul ɦɔk]; born 31 January 1970 in Sagolia, Assam) is an All India United Democratic Front politician from Assam. He was elected to the Assam Legislative Assembly in the 2016 election from Dhubri constituency.
