= Nagaon (village) =

- Village
- Location in Assam, India Nagaon (India)
- Coordinates: 26.30°N 91.10°E
- Country: India
- State: Assam
- Region: Western Assam
- District: Barpeta

Government
  - Body: Gram panchayat
- Elevation: 51 m (167 ft)

Languages
  - Official: Assamese
- Time zone: UTC+5:30 (IST)
- PIN: 781309; 781311
- Vehicle registration: AS
- Website: barpeta.nic.in

Nagaon is a village and mouza (tehsil) in Barpeta district, situated in the north bank of the river Brahmaputra.

== Transport ==
The village is near Hajo Doulashal road (National Highway 427) and connected to nearby towns and cities like Barpeta, Hajo and Guwahati with regular buses and other modes of transportation.

== Notable people ==
- Mahendra Mohan Choudhry, former Governor of Punjab and former Chief Minister of Assam.

== See also ==
- Tukrapara
- Tupamari
