= Rohini Kumar Chaudhuri =

Indian politician

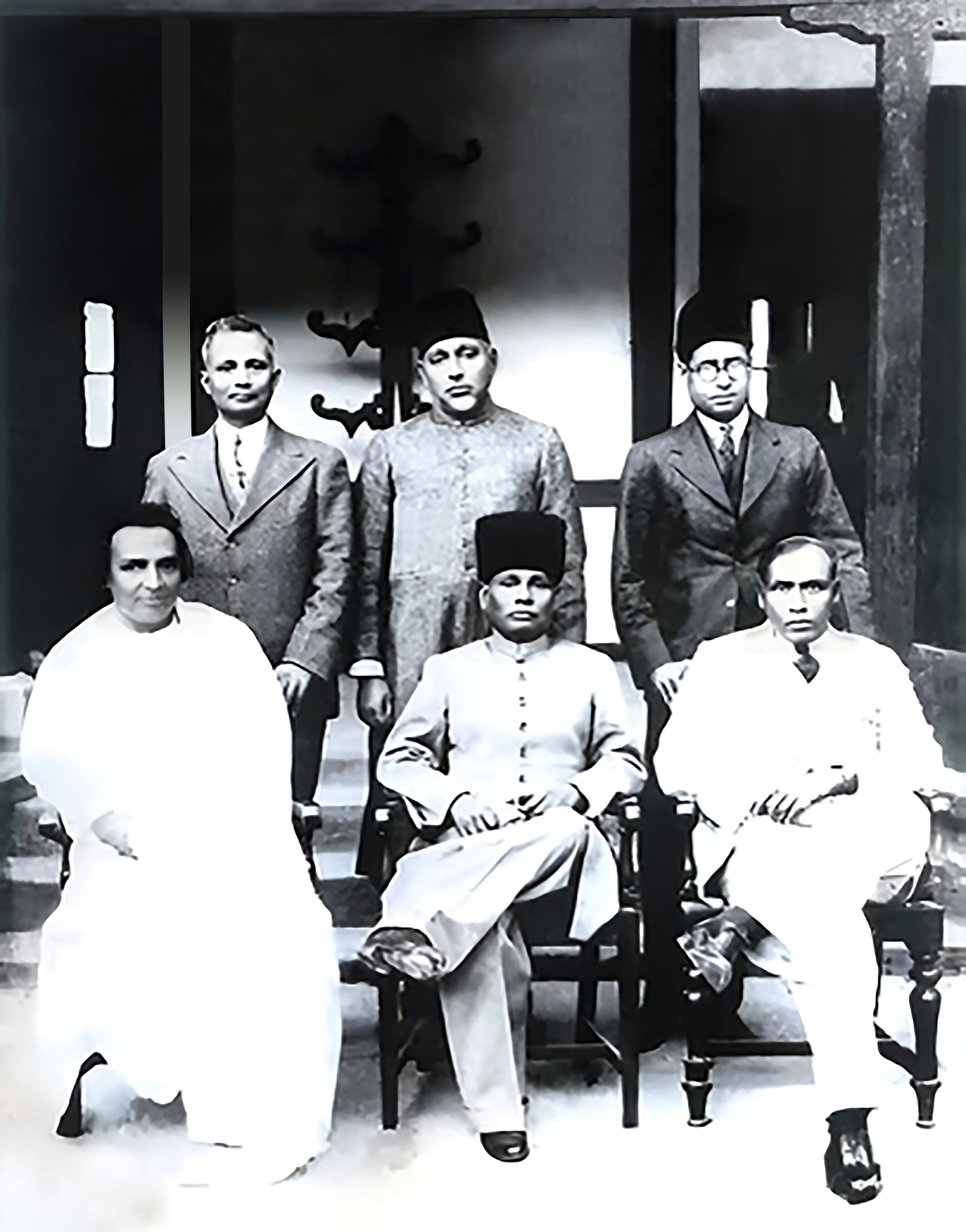
- R.Choudhury seated from left corner

Member of Parliament, Lok Sabha
- In office 17 April 1952 – 16 December 1955
- Preceded by: Seat established
- Succeeded by: Devendra Nath Sarma
- Constituency: Gauhati, Assam

Minister for Revenue, Judicial and Legislative Affairs
- In office 23 March 1945 – 11 February 1946
- Chief Minister: Muhammed Saadulah
- Preceded by: Rupnath Brahma; Munawwar Ali; Muddabbir Hussain Chaudhuri
- Succeeded by: Basanta Kumar Das

Minister for Education and Prisons
- In office 17 November 1939 – 24 December 1941
- Chief Minister: Muhammed Saadulah
- Preceded by: Gopinath Bordoloi (education portfolio)
- Succeeded by: Sayidur Rahman

Minister for Revenue and Forest
- In office 5 February 1938 – 18 September 1938
- Chief Minister: Muhammed Saadulah
- Preceded by: himself
- Succeeded by: Fakhruddin Ali Ahmed; Rupnath Brahma

Minister for Revenue, Judicial and General Affairs
- In office 1 April 1937 – 4 February 1938
- Chief Minister: Muhammed Saadulah
- Preceded by: Office established
- Succeeded by: himself Abdul Matin Chaudhury

Personal details
- Born: 2 April 1899 Barpeta, Assam Province
- Died: 16 December 1955 (aged 56)
- Party: Indian National Congress
- Children: Prabin Kumar Chaudhuri

Rohini Kumar Chaudhuri (or Chaudhury, 2 April 1899 – 16 December 1955) was an Indian politician. He was a Member of Parliament, representing Gauhati, Assam in the Lok Sabha the lower house of India's Parliament as a member of the Indian National Congress. He was also a member of the Constituent Assembly of India.

== Early life ==
Rohini Kumar Chaudhuri was born in Kamrup, Assam on 2 May 1889. Chaudhuri attended Government High Schools in Nowgong, Gauhati, Dhubri in Assam and went on to obtain degrees in Arts and Law from the Scottish Church College, Presidency College and Ripon College. Later he became a Senior Advocate in the Supreme Court of India.

He became a member of the Assam legislature from 1927 to 1945.
