= Nicholas Beatson-Bell =

Scottish colonial administrator and governor in British India

The Rev. Sir Nicholas Dodd Beatson-Bell KCSI KCIE (19 June 1867 – 12 February 1936) was a Scottish colonial administrator, civil servant and later Anglican priest.

== Biography ==
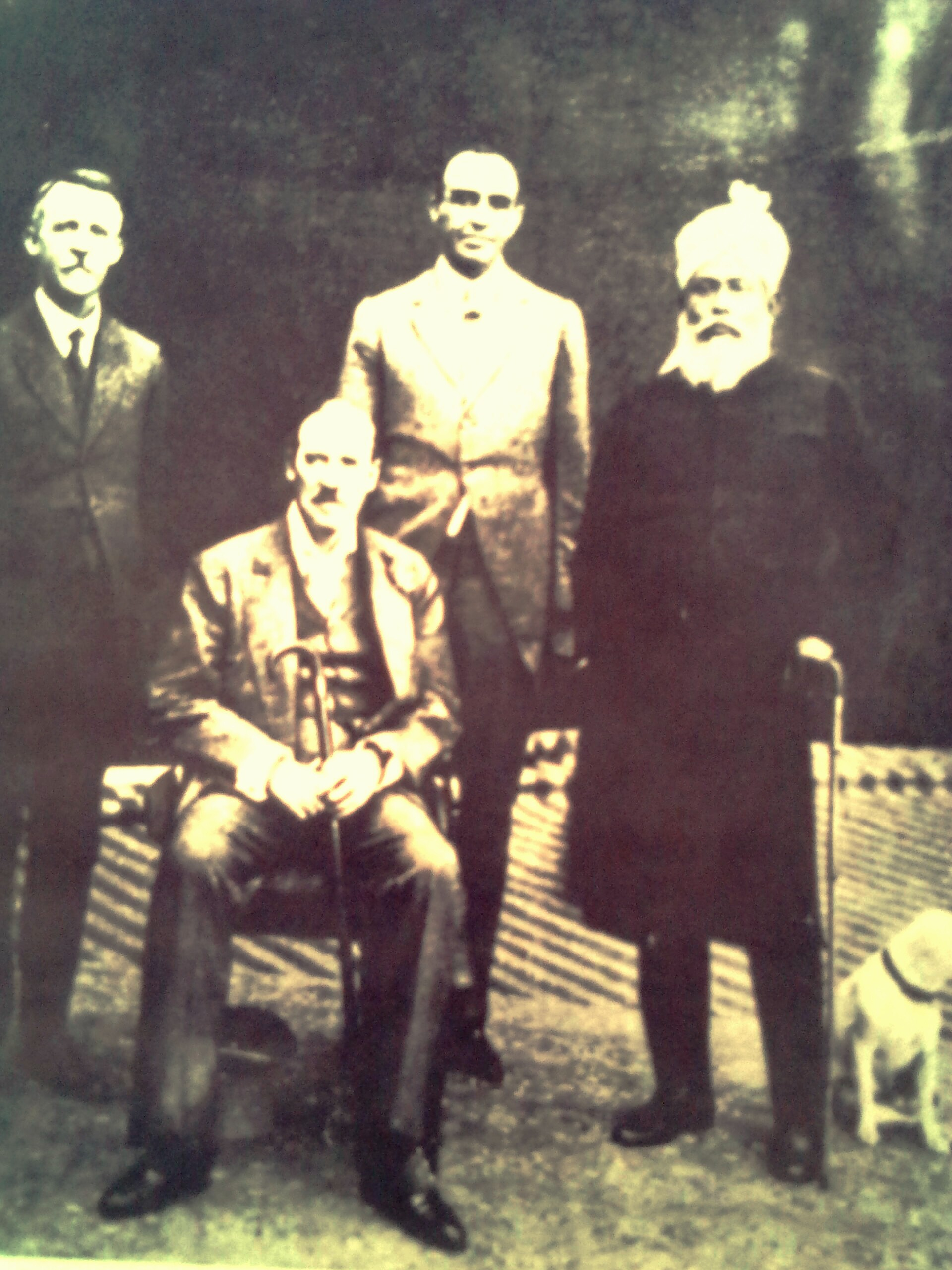
Beatson-Bell standing second from right

Nicholas Beatson-Bell was born in Aberdour, Scotland, the son of Andrew Beatson Bell, who was Sheriff-Substitute of Fife. He studied at Edinburgh Academy and Balliol College, Oxford, under the tutelage of Sir William Markby.

He served in the Indian Civil Service. On 7 December 1914 he was made a member of the Council of the Governor of Bengal. In 1918 he was made Chief Commissioner of Assam, and became the first Governor of Assam on 3 January 1921. He was succeeded by William Sinclair Marris three months later. He was made a Knight Commander of the Order of the Indian Empire in the 1919 New Year Honours and a Knight Commander of the Order of the Star of India in the 1921 New Year Honours.

Syed Mujtaba Ali noted in his memoir পাদটীকা that Rev. Beatson-Bell used to refer to himself as নন্দদুলাল বাজায় ঘণ্টা (lit. Nanda Dulal beats on bell) and was very fond of his three-legged dog. He used to spend Rs. 75 per month to look after the dog, which was around thrice the salary of a typical secondary school teacher at that time.

He left the Civil Service to do missionary work in a small Bengal village. In 1921, Beatson-Bell was ordained a deacon by the bishop of Calcutta, and in 1922 he was ordained priest at York in 1920 by Archbishop Cosmo Gordon Lang. He returned home to be curate of Whitby, and then became a country vicar. He was the vicar of Cornish Hall End in Braintree, Essex, where he died from a heart attack at the age of 68.

Beatson-Bell married Jeannie Arbuthnott, daughter of John Campbell Arbuthnott CIE of the Colonial Civil Service and Jeannie Sinclair Hamilton, in Shillong on 21 November 1911. Together they had two daughters.
