= Debomoy Sanyal =

Indian politician

Bharatiya Janata Party candidate for Dhubri, Assam (2014 Indian general election)
- Election date 12 April 2014
- Opponent: Badruddin Ajmal (AIUDF)
- Incumbent: Badruddin Ajmal

Personal details
- Political party: Bharatiya Janata Party

Debomoy Sanyal is a Bharatiya Janata Party politician from Assam. He was fielded as the BJP candidate from the Dhubri constituency in the 2014 Indian general election.
