= Akshay Kumar Das =

Pakistani politician

Minister of Economic Affairs of East Pakistan
- In office 26 September 1955 – 12 September 1956

Commerce Minister of East Pakistan
- In office 05 November 1957 – November 16, 1957

Finance Minister of East Pakistan
- In office December 16, 1957 – 7 December 1958

Member of the National Assembly of Pakistan
- In office 1947–1954

Personal details
- Born: 1903
- Died: Unknown

Akshay Kumar Das (Bengali: অক্ষয় কুমার দাস; born 1903) was a Bengali Hindu politician of Pakistan, who served as a representative of East Pakistan in both the First and Second Constituent Assemblies, and held multiple ministries across the 1950s in governments formed by different political parties.

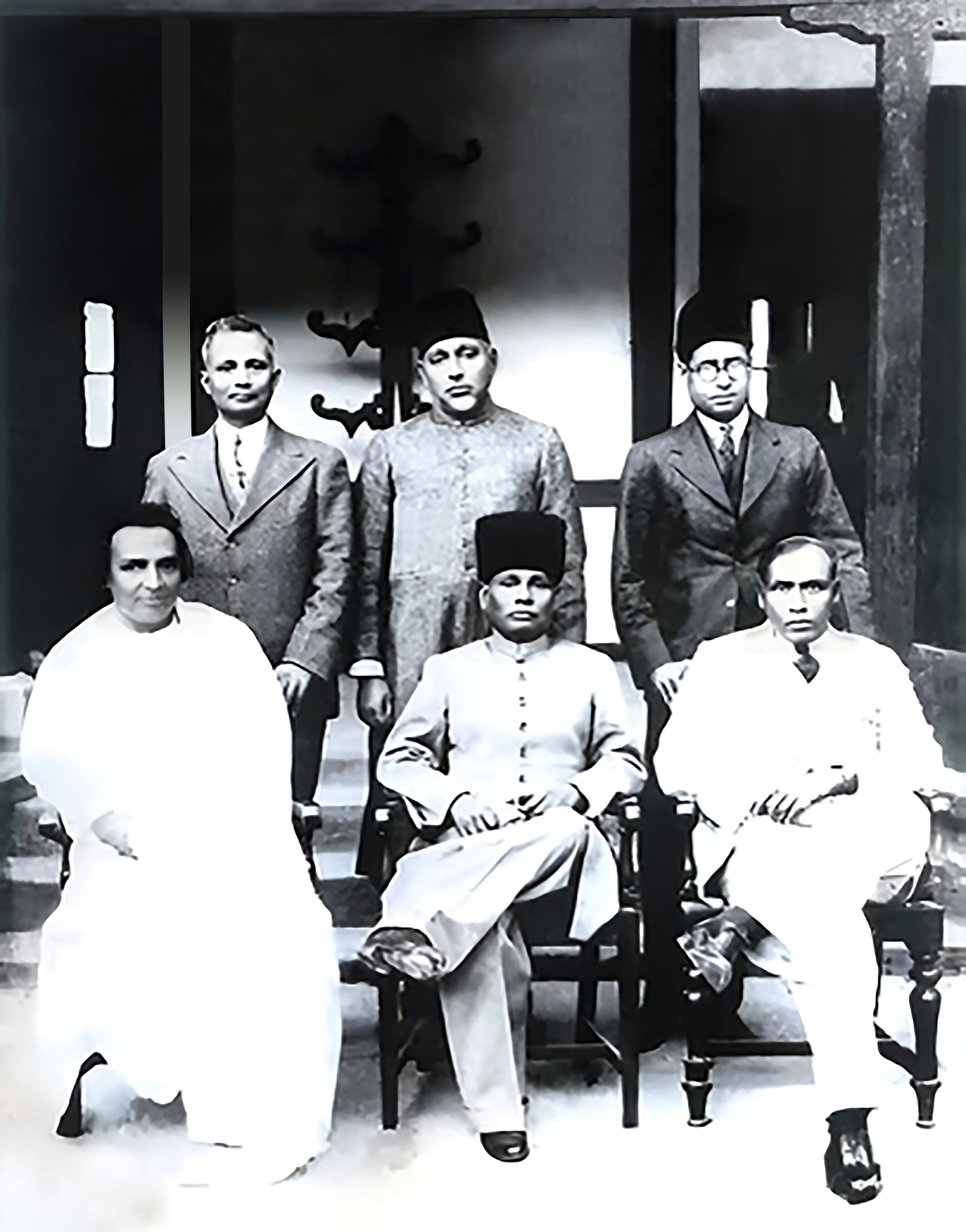
After swearing-in of 2nd coalition Saaduluh ministry, February 1938, Standing (l to r) J J M Nichols-Roy, Muhammed Saadulah, Abdul Matin Chaudhury. Seated (l to r) Rohini Kumar Chaudhuri, Munawar Ali, Das

Das was born at Sullah, Sylhet in 1903. He was a lawyer by training, and practiced at the local court before joining politics. In the 1937 Assam Provincial Assembly Elections, he filed his nomination from Sunamganj, a dual-member constituency, (Note: In these constituencies —surpassing a threshold percentage of Scheduled Caste (SC) voters—, all Hindu candidates were enrollable as candidates but a seat was reserved for Scheduled Caste (SC) in addition to the usual seat. Both the seats were electable through the same election under the one person, one vote system. The highest ranked SC candidate was declared winner to the "reserved" seat while whoever else polled the most (or second-most, in case the highest ranked SC candidate won the election) staked claim to the "general" seat. Only four SC candidates were allowed to run for election per constituency; otherwise, a primary election was held for the SC electorate to sieve out the top four candidates among all the SC contenders.) from the Constitutionalist Party. Das won the reserved seat, unopposed. (Note: On the overall, he was defeated by Karuna Sindhu Roy, a member of the Communist Party of India.) In February 1938, he was appointed as the Minister of Law in the Second Ministry of Muhammed Saadulah, as All India Muslim League entered into new coalitions to preserve power. Nonetheless, as the government fell in September with Congress poaching off coalition partners, Das switched sides to become the Minister of Excise and Agriculture under the premiership of Gopinath Bordoloi. In 1939, with Congress governments resigning across India in protest against United Kingdom's unilateral decision to enroll Indian forces in World War II, Assam United Party — an amalgamation of Muslim League with all shades of parties opposed to Congress — formed a successful coalition under Saadulah; however, Das was left out from the cabinet. The Government fell again in December 1941 but after about seven months of Governor's Rule, Saadulah managed to regain the numbers; yet again, Das was not inducted in the cabinet. In March 1945, Congress came to an understanding with the Muslim League and formed an unprecedented coalition government with virtually no opposition; Das was brought back to the ministry and assigned the portfolios of Industries and Cooperative Development.

In the 1946 elections, he was re-elected unopposed but as a member of the Congress. (Note: Again, on the overall, he was defeated by Jatindra Bhadra of Congress.) He was subsequently elected (Note: The Cabinet Mission Plan had reserved one seat in the Constitution Assembly per million people of a province. These seats were distributed among Muslims, Sikhs, and General (Hindus and others) category in proportion to their share of population in the province and were to be elected by legislators of the particular community. Assam Province was allotted ten seats, of which seven were reserved for General category and the rest for Muslims.) by the Assembly to represent Assam at the Constituent Assembly of India. Das opposed Partition — unlike many of his Dalit compatriots — and lobbied for the inclusion of Sylhet in India but chose to stay in Pakistan after the referendum went against him, becoming a member of the Constituent Assembly of Pakistan. In Pakistan, he became the President of East Bengal Scheduled Castes Federation in the aftermath of Jogendra Nath Mandal's departure to India (1950) and gained significant political mileage.

In the 1954 East Bengal Legislative Assembly election, Das was re-elected from his seat. In September 1955, he was appointed as the Minister of State for Economic Affairs by Prime Minister Chaudhry Muhammad Ali where he continued until the government fell in September 1956. In October 1957, I. I. Chundrigar (from Muslim League) formed government and appointed him as the Minister of State for Caste Affairs but his government fell within 2 months. Feroz Khan Noon (Republican Party) formed the next government in December, 1957 and had Das appointed as the Minister of State for Finance.
