= Assam Valley Party =

- Abbreviation: AVP
- President: Muhammed Saadulah
- Founded: 1937
- Dissolved: 1946
- Ideology: Social Justice
- Colours: Green
- ECI status: State Party
- Seats in Assam Province(1946): 31 / 108

Assam Valley Party was founded by Muhammed Saadulah, the first Prime Minister of Assam in 1937. It was the second largest political party after Indian National Congress during 1937–1946 in Assam. It formed government three times in Assam Province, in 1937, 1939 and in 1942.

== Prime Minister of Assam ==
| No | Name | Image | Term(s) | Party | Governor | Viceroy |
|---|---|---|---|---|---|---|
| 1 | Sir Syed Muhammad Saadulla | | 1 April 1937-21 August 1938 | Assam Valley Party (coalition with INC) | Robert Neil Reid | The Marquess of Linlithgow |
| 2 | Sir Syed Muhammad Saadulla | | 17 November 1939 - 25 December 1941 | Assam Valley Party (coalition with AIML) | Robert Neil Reid Sir Andrew Gourlay Clow | The Marquess of Linlithgow; The Viscount Wavell |
| 3 | Sir Syed Muhammad Saadulla | | 24 August 1942 – 11 February 1946 | Assam Valley Party (coalition with AIML) | Robert Neil Reid Sir Andrew Gourlay Clow | The Marquess of Linlithgow; The Viscount Wavell |
