= Jahan Uddin (politician) =

Indian politician

MLA of Dhubri Vidhan Sabha Constituency
- In office 2011–2016
- Preceded by: Rasul Hoque
- Succeeded by: Najrul Hoque

Personal details
- Party: All India United Democratic Front

Jahan Uddin is an Indian politician. In 2011 he was elected as MLA of Dhubri Vidhan Sabha Constituency in Assam Legislative Assembly. He is an All India United Democratic Front politician.
