= Dhubri Assembly constituency =

Assembly constituency of Assam

Coordinates: 26.02°N 89.97°E

Dhubri
- Constituency No. 8 for the Assam Legislative Assembly

Constituency details
- Country: India
- Region: Northeast India
- State: Assam
- Division: Lower Assam
- District: Dhubri
- Lok Sabha constituency: Dhubri
- Established: 1951
- Reservation: None

Member of Legislative Assembly
- 16th Assam Legislative Assembly
- Incumbent Baby Begum
- Party: Indian National Congress
- Alliance: Asom Sonmilito Morcha
- Elected year: 2026

Dhubri Assembly constituency is one of the 126 constituencies of the Assam Legislative Assembly. Dhubri is part of the Dhubri Lok Sabha constituency.

== Dhubri Assembly constituency ==
The following are the details of Dhubri Assembly constituency:

- Country: India.
- State: Assam.
- District: Dhubri district.
- Lok Sabha Constituency: Dhubri Lok Sabha constituency.
- Area Includes: Dhubri Municipal Board, Birsing Jarua Dev. Block (Part), Gauripur Dev. Block (Part), Rupshi Dev. Block (Part).

== Members of the Legislative Assembly ==
| Year | Member | Party |
|---|---|---|
| 1952 | Tamijuddin Prodhani | Indian National Congress |
| 1957 | Tamijuddin Prodhani | Indian National Congress |
| 1962 | Md. Umaruddin | Indian National Congress |
| 1967 | S. A. Ali | Indian National Congress |
| 1972 | Md. Umaruddin | Indian National Congress |
| 1978 | Md. Umaruddin | Indian National Congress |
| 1983 | Md. Umaruddin | Indian National Congress |
| 1985 | Mosiruddin Sheikh | Indian National Congress |
| 1991 | Dhruba Kumar Sen | Bharatiya Janata Party |
| 1996 | Nazibul Umar | Indian National Congress |
| 2001 | Nazibul Umar | Indian National Congress |
| 2006 | Rasul Hoque | All India United Democratic Front |
| 2011 | Jahan Uddin | All India United Democratic Front |
| 2016 | Najrul Hoque | All India United Democratic Front |
| 2021 | Najrul Hoque | All India United Democratic Front |
| 2026 | Baby Begum | Indian National Congress |

== Election results ==
=== 2026 ===
2026 Assam Legislative Assembly election: Dhubri
| Party | Candidate | Votes | % | ±% |
|---|---|---|---|---|
| INC | Baby Begum | 118,362 | 53.64 | +44.00 |
| AIUDF | Nazrul Hoque | 49,701 | 22.52 | −47.72 |
| BJP | Uttam Prasad | 49,654 | 22.50 | −3.63 |
| RPI(A) | Omar Ali Sk. | 970 | 0.44 | N/A |
| SUCI(C) | Shahana Aktar | 577 | 0.26 | N/A |
| NOTA | None of the above | 1,386 | 0.63 | +0.02 |
| Majority | | 68,661 | 31.12 | −12.99 |
| Turnout | | 220,650 | 92.68 | +2.71 |
| Registered electors | | | | |
| INC gain from AIUDF | | Swing | -16.60 | |

=== 2021 ===
2021 Assam Legislative Assembly election: Dhubri
| Party | Candidate | Votes | % | ±% |
|---|---|---|---|---|
| AIUDF | Najrul Hoque | 123,913 | 70.24 | +29.88 |
| BJP | Dr. Debamoy Sanyal | 46,100 | 26.13 | +3.84 |
| Independent | Rasul Hoque | 2,126 | 1.21 | −1.10 |
| AJP | Azad Ali Sheikh | 1,704 | 0.97 | N/A |
| NOTA | None of the above | 1,069 | 0.61 | −0.10 |
| Majority | | 77,813 | 44.11 | +28.26 |
| Turnout | | 176,423 | 89.97 | +1.88 |
| Registered electors | | 196,081 | | +13.63 |
| AIUDF hold | | Swing | | |

=== 2016 ===
2016 Assam Legislative Assembly election: Dhubri
| Party | Candidate | Votes | % | ±% |
|---|---|---|---|---|
| AIUDF | Najrul Hoque | 60,933 | 40.36 | −2.74 |
| Independent | Nazibul Umar | 36,847 | 24.41 | N/A |
| BJP | Dr. Debamoy Sanyal | 33,648 | 22.29 | +7.67 |
| INC | Abedur Zaman | 13,126 | 8.69 | −28.43 |
| Independent | Rasul Hoque | 3,486 | 2.31 | New |
| NOTA | None of the above | 1,069 | 0.71 | N/A |
| Majority | | 24,086 | 15.95 | +9.97 |
| Turnout | | 150,954 | 87.48 | +5.64 |
| Registered electors | | 172,563 | | +12.86 |
| AIUDF hold | | Swing | | |

=== 2011 ===
2011 Assam Legislative Assembly election: Dhubri
| Party | Candidate | Votes | % | ±% |
|---|---|---|---|---|
| AIUDF | Jahan Uddin | 53,937 | 43.10 | |
| INC | Nazibul Umar | 46,455 | 37.12 | |
| BJP | Dr. Debamoy Sanyal | 18,301 | 14.62 | |
| AGP | Abu Adil Md. Enamul Haque | 2,948 | 2.36 | |
| AITC | Faizul Haque | 1,475 | 1.18 | |
| NCP | Roushon Zamir Alfaruque | 1,339 | 1.07 | |
| SUCI(C) | Kazi Jamiruddin Ahmed | 686 | 0.55 | |
| Majority | | 7,482 | 5.98 | |
| Turnout | | 1,25,141 | 81.84 | |
| Registered electors | | 1,52,899 | | |
| AIUDF hold | | Swing | | |
