= Abdul Matin Chaudhury =

Pakistani Bengali politician from Sylhet

Moulvi Abdul Matin Chaudhury
- আব্দুল মতিন চৌধুরী عبدالمتین چودھری
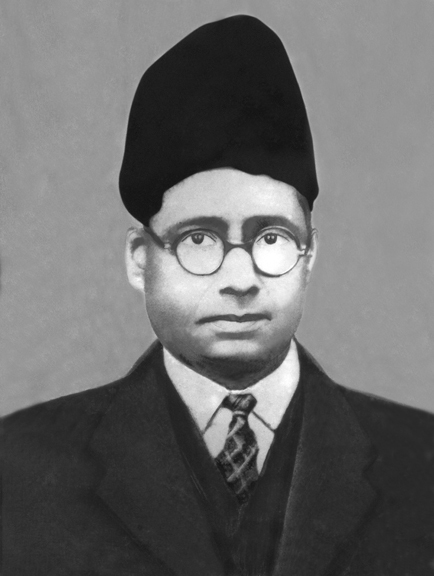
- Chaudhury in 1938

Member of the 1st National Assembly of Pakistan
- In office 1947–1948
- Preceded by: Post established

Member of the Assam Legislative Assembly
- In office 1937–1947
- Prime Minister: Muhammad Saadulah
- Constituency: Sylhet Sadar (East)

Deputy President of Indian Legislative Assembly
- In office March 1933 – 1934
- Preceded by: R. K. Shanmukham Chetty
- Succeeded by: Akhil Chandra Datta

Member of Central Legislative Assembly
- In office 1926–1934
- Preceded by: Ahmad Ali Khan
- Succeeded by: Abdur Rasheed Choudhury
- Constituency: Assam (Muslim)

Personal details
- Born: 13 February 1895 Bhadeshwar, Golapganj, Sylhet District, Assam
- Died: 28 December 1948 (aged 53) Karachi, Sind, Pakistan
- Resting place: Mewa Shah Graveyard, Karachi
- Party: All-India Muslim League (till 1947); Muslim League (Pakistan) (1947-1948)
- Parents: Abdul Karim Chaudhary (father); Habibunnesa Khatun (mother)
- Education: Ripon College
- Occupation: Politician and journalist
- Nickname: Kola Mia

Abdul Matin Chaudhury (Bengali: আব্দুল মতিন চৌধুরী; 1895–1948), also known by his daak naam Kola Mia (Bengali: কলা মিঞা); and the epithet Jinnar Daain Haat (lit. Jinnah's right hand); (also spelled Abdul Matin Chaudhary in English (Note: This article uses the spelling Chaudhury for consistency.)) was a Pakistani Bengali trade unionist, journalist, politician, and a member of the Pakistan Constituent Assembly as a representative of East Bengal.

== Early life and education ==
Chaudhury was born on 13 February 1895 to a Bengali Muslim family in the mahalla of Fatehkhani in Bhadeswar pargana, Golapganj Upazila, Sylhet District, in the then Assam province. His father, Abdul Karim Chaudhury, was a sub-inspector of police, and his mother, Habibunnesa Khatun, was a housewife. The title of Chaudhury was awarded to his ancestor Dost Mohammed by the Mughal emperor Aurangzeb.

He completed his secondary education at Habiganj Government High School, where he gained a first division in 1912. He then proceeded to study at the Murari Chand College in Sylhet, where he completed his Intermediate Arts examination in 1914. In 1916, Chaudhury graduated from the Muhammadan Anglo-Oriental College in Aligarh (later Aligarh Muslim University). He also completed his Bachelor of Law from Ripon College, Calcutta, in 1919.

== Political career ==
Chaudhury practiced law for a short time in 1920–1 but soon became active in politics by joining the Khilafat Movement in 1921. In 1923, he joined the Swaraj Party and, prompted by Subhas Chandra Bose, began to organize its members in Sylhet. However, following the death of the party's founder, Chittaranjan Das, in 1925, Chaudhury moved his affiliation to the Indian Congress Party led by Mahatma Gandhi.

From 1925 to 1937, Chaudhury was an elected member of the Indian Legislative Assembly for Assam. He soon aligned with Muhammad Ali Jinnah's grouping of independents. In 1930, he argued that there should be legislation to set minimum wages and reduce working hours for railway workers and other tradespeople. In 1930–31, he was a member of the Drugs Enquiry Committee headed by Ram Nath Chopra which examined the need for imports, control and regulation for pharmaceuticals. One of its conclusions was that the quality of quinine, which was used to prevent malaria, was often very poor.

Jinnah and the Simon Commission had recommended that constitutional reforms in India be discussed with the British government, and three Round Table Conferences were held. Chaudhury attended the first of these in London (November 1930 – January 1931) as private secretary to Sir Muhammad Akbar Hydari, who represented Hyderabad. Jinnah remained in England until 1934 but in this period Chaudhury maintained an extensive correspondence with him and urged him to return to India. Chaudhury realised that he could encourage this by attempting to unify the political factions within the All-India Muslim League. In this, he was successful and in 1933 he became its vice-president, while Jinnah became president in 1934.

In 1933, Chaudhury was elected deputy president of the assembly (a post equivalent to deputy speaker). In 1934, he attended the Melbourne Centenary in Australia as the sole representative of the Indian branch of the Empire Parliamentary Association. He travelled by train and boat and wrote a diary that has been published.

In 1937, as a member of the Assam Legislative Assembly, he supported a resolution for the abolition of the Line System, which he called "a system of racial prerogative, a system of economic exploitation for which you won't find a parallel anywhere in India". The more charismatic and 'man of the masses' Abdul Hamid Khan Bhashani helped Chaudhury in agitating against the Line System with prominent All-India Muslim League leader Chaudhry Khaliquzzaman of the United Provinces, with Bhashani's invitation, visiting Assam annually between 1941 and 1946 to agitate against the Line System.

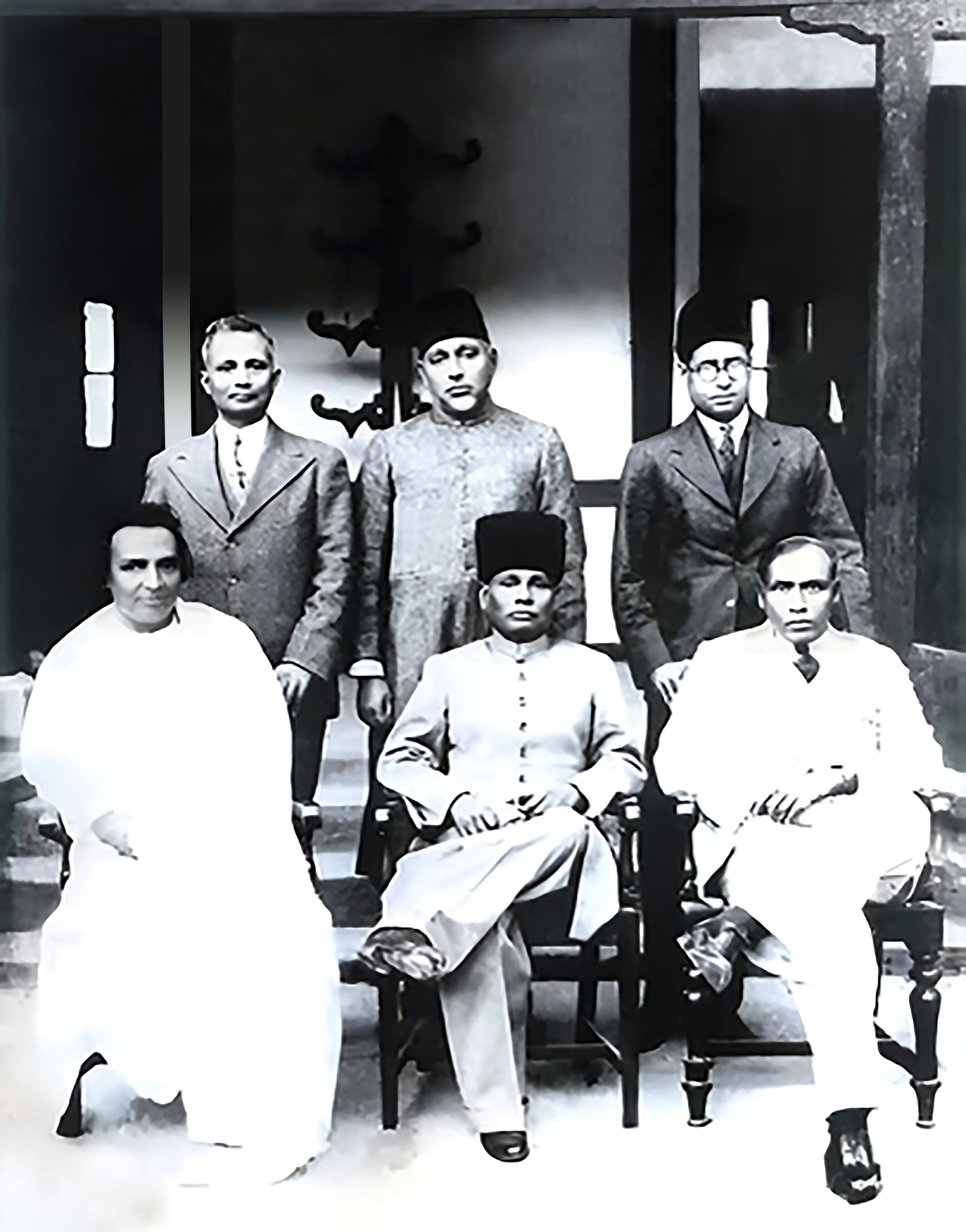
After swearing-in of 2nd coalition Saaduluh ministry, February 1938, Standing (l to r) J J M Nichols-Roy, Muhammad Saadulah, Chaudhury. Seated (l to r) Rohini Kumar Chaudhuri, Munawar Ali, Akshay Kumar Das

Chaudhury served as a minister for four terms between February 1938 to February 1946 in the Assam provincial government under Sir Syed Muhammad Saadulah as premier (prime minister).

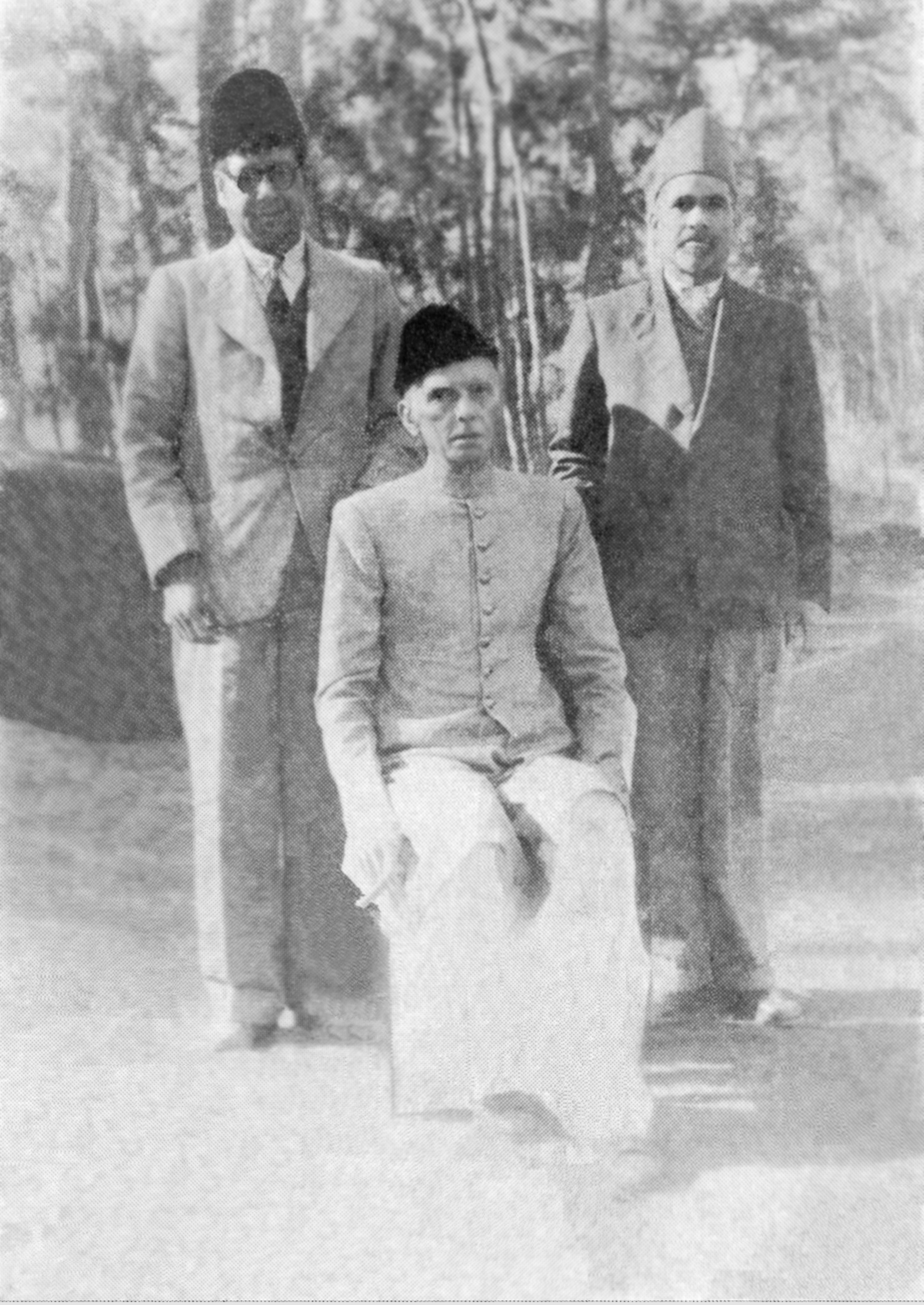
(l to r) Chaudhury with M A Jinnah and Abdul Malik Chaudhury (Chaudhury's brother), in Shillong, March 1946

He played a leading role in the establishment of the Assam Muslim League in 1937, along with Abdul Hamid Khan Bhashani. Between 1936 and 1947, he was a member of the All-India Muslim League working committee. In March 1940 he was one of the twenty sponsors of the Lahore Resolution which proposed the establishment of Pakistan. The sponsors represented Muslims from all the provinces of India. In 1946, Chaudhury was part of a sub-committee of the All-India Muslim League that drafted the Delhi Resolution, which called for the establishment of a unitary Pakistan comprising northwest and northeast India and was moved by Huseyn Shaheed Suhrawardy.

In June 1947, the Mountbatten Plan included provisions for the fate of the Sylhet district to be decided by a referendum. Chaudhury was the president of the Sylhet Referendum Board of the Muslim League. The referendum was held in July, and the region subsequently became part of East Bengal after the majority voted for that outcome. Subsequently, Chaudhury became a member of the Constituent Assembly of Pakistan and a member of the first Pay Commission of Pakistan, two positions he held till the time of his death. He was also a longtime member of the Aligarh University Court.

== Journalism ==
In 1921, Chaudhury wrote an article in the weekly Sylhet Chronicle in favour of the Khilafat Movement. The British government considered it seditious and sentenced him to one year's imprisonment, which he served out in the Sylhet jail. In 1923 he served as chief editor of The Mohammadi weekly of Mohammad Akram Khan, and was a long-time assistant editor of the Daily Forward newspaper of Chittaranjan Das in Calcutta. He worked on the editing board of the Bombay Chronicle from 1926 to 1927. In 1932 he founded the Bengali weekly newspaper Jugabheri, which as of 2024 still has a daily edition. He also published an English weekly newspaper titled The Eastern Herald in 1939.

== Trade unionism ==
In order to recover from the rigours of imprisonment, Chaudhury went to Shillong, then the capital city of Assam. There, he made an attempt to organise the Khansamas (male domestic cooks) of the European households, which has been referred to as the first attempt to form a trade union in Assam. The deputy commissioner expelled him from Shillong with a notice of 24 hours.

Chaudhury created the Indian Quarter Masters' Union in Calcutta, known as the Succuny Union, in 1922, and became the president of the union in 1926. He was present at the International Labour Conference in Geneva, in 1929, as technical adviser to the Indian Labour Delegation.

== Death ==
Chaudhury died on 28 December 1948. He was buried in the historic Mewa Shah Graveyard in Karachi.
