= Robert Reid (civil servant) =

British military officer and administrator (1839-1916)

Sir Robert Niel Reid KCSI KCIE

Governor of Assam
- In office 4 March 1937 – 4 May 1942
- Monarch: George VI
- Governor General: Victor Hope, 2nd Marquess of Linlithgow
- Preceded by: Michael Keane
- Succeeded by: Andrew Clow

Personal details
- Born: c. 1883 Sevenoaks, Kent, England
- Died: October 24, 1964 (aged 80–81) Heath Lodge, Woodbridge, Suffolk, England
- Children: Robert Basil Reid
- Parents: David Reid (father); Jessie Watson Reid (b. Ballingall) (mother)
- Education: Malvern College
- Profession: Director General of Post and Telegraph Censorship

Sir Robert Niel Reid KCSI KCIE (15 July 1883 – 24 October 1964) was a British colonial administrator in India. He was Governor of Assam from 1937 to 1942.

His son, Sir Robert Basil Reid, was chairman of the British Railways Board from 1983 until 1990.

== See also ==
- Reid Scheme
