= Kalaigaon Assembly constituency =

Constituency of the Assam legislative assembly in India

Coordinates: 26.57°N 91.97°E

Kalaigaon
- Former constituency No. 65 for the Assam Legislative Assembly

Constituency details
- Country: India
- Region: Northeast India
- State: Assam
- District: Darrang
- Lok Sabha constituency: Mangaldoi
- Established: 1951
- Abolished: 2023
- Reservation: None

Kalaigaon Assembly constituency was one of the 126 assembly constituencies of Assam Legislative Assembly. Kalaigaon formed part of the Mangaldoi Lok Sabha constituency.

This constituency was abolished in 2023.

== Members of Legislative Assembly ==
Election	Member	Party affiliation
1952	Dandi Ram Dutta	Praja Socialist Party
1962	Dandi Ram Dutta	Indian National Congress
1967	Dandi Ram Dutta	Indian National Congress
1972	Lakshmi Kanta Saikia	Indian National Congress
1978	Nagen Sarma	Janata Party
1985	Mahendra Mohan Rai Choudhury	Independent
1991	Jew Ram Boro	Independent
1996	Mahendra Mohan Rai Choudhury	Asom Gana Parishad
2001	Nathu Boro	Independent
2006	Maheswar Baro	Independent
2011	Mukunda Ram Choudhury	Asom Gana Parishad
2016	Maheswar Baro	Bodoland People's Front
2021	Durga Das Boro	Bodoland People's Front

== Election results ==
=== 2021 ===
2021 Assam Legislative Assembly election: Kalaigaon
Party	Candidate	Votes	%	±%
Majority				
Turnout				
Registered electors				

=== 1952 by-election ===
1952 Assam Legislative Assembly by-elections: Kalaigaon
Party	Candidate	Votes	%	±%
PSP	Dandi Ram Dutta	10,534		
INC	Sibaprasad Sarma	6,688		
Margin of victory		3,846		
Turnout				
PSP gain from Socialist		Swing		
