= Michael Keane (governor) =

Sir Michael Keane KCSI, CIE (14 June 1874 – 10 August 1937) was a British colonial administrator in India. He was Governor of Assam from 1932 to 1937.

Educated at Blackrock College, Dublin and University College, London, Keane entered the Indian Civil Service by examination in 1897 and arrived in India on 21 November 1898. He first served in the North-Western Provinces as assistant magistrate and collector, and assistant settlement officer. He was under-secretary to the government from April 1906 to November 1907. In February 1908 he became a joint magistrate. From December 1910 to January 1915 he was on deputation to Tonk State and Sirohi State.
