= Assam Province =

Province of British India

Coordinates: 26.14°N 91.77°E

North-East Frontier (1874–1905) Assam Province (1912–1947)
- Province of British India
- 1874–1947
- Flag Badge

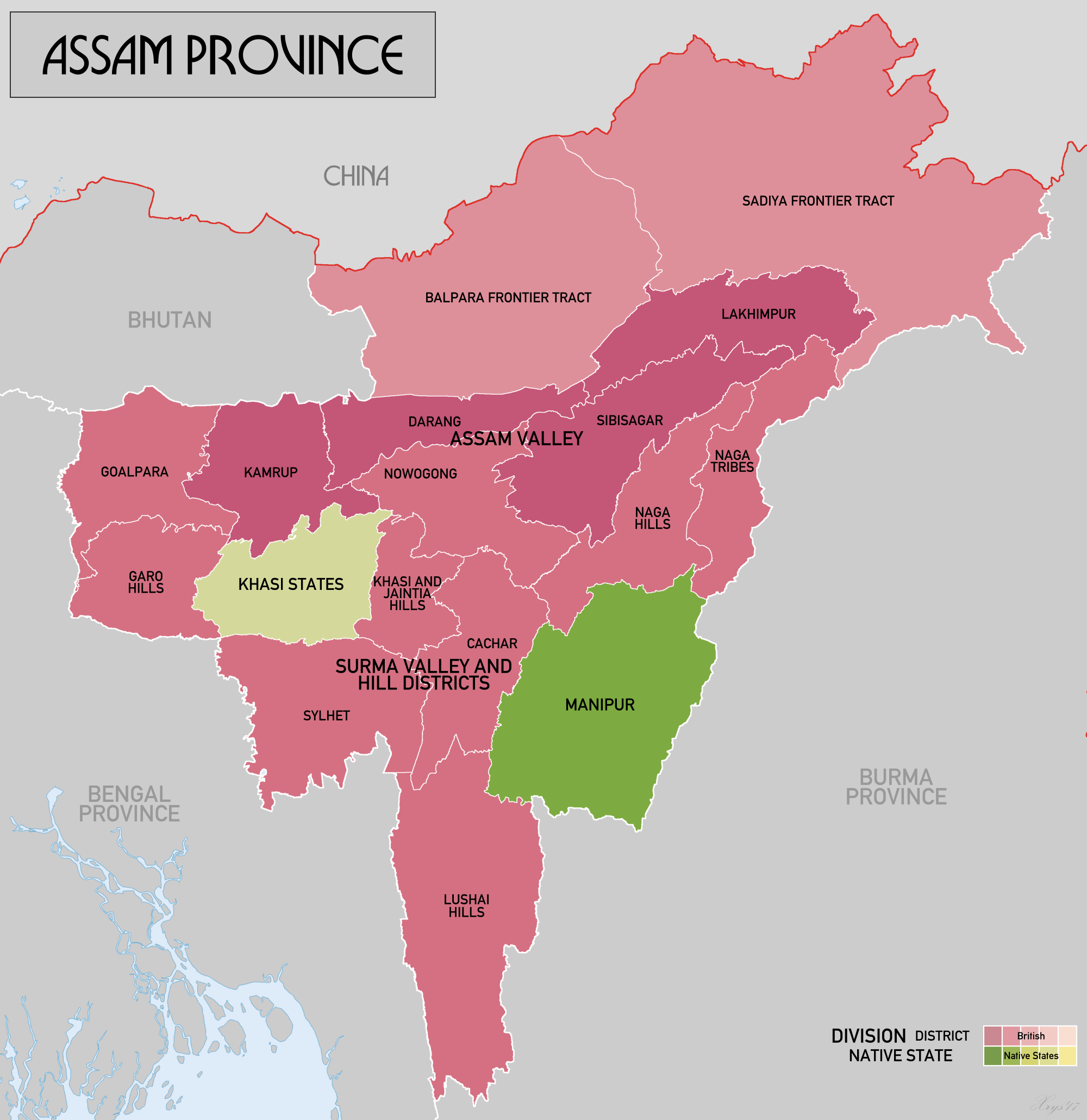
- Assam Province in 1936
- Capital: Shillong
- Area
  - 1901: 121,908 (Note: Province area. Total area including dependent states (Manipur - 8456 sq mi and Khasi Hills - 6157 sq mi) is 61,682 sq mi (159755 км2)) km^{2} (47,069 sq mi)
  - 1914: 202,270 (Note: Province area after Simla Convention and accession of South Tibet excluding dependent states.) km^{2} (78,100 sq mi)
- History
  - Bifurcation of Eastern Bengal and Assam: 1912
  - Simla Convention: 1914
  - Independence of India: 15 August 1947
Preceded by	Succeeded by
Eastern Bengal and Assam	Assam; East Bengal
- Today part of: Bangladesh; Sylhet; India; Assam; Arunachal Pradesh; Manipur; Meghalaya; Mizoram; Nagaland; Tripura

Assam Province was a province of British India, created in 1912 by the partition of the Eastern Bengal and Assam Province. Its capital was in Shillong.

The Assam territory was first separated from Bengal in 1874 as the 'North-East Frontier' non-regulation province. It was incorporated into the new province of Eastern Bengal and Assam in 1905 and re-established as a province in 1912.

== History ==
In 1824, Assam was occupied by British forces following the First Anglo-Burmese War and on 24 February 1826 it was ceded to Britain by Burma under the Yandaboo Treaty of 1826. Between 1826 and 1832, Assam was made part of Bengal under the Bengal Presidency. From 1832 to October 1838, the Assam princely state was restored in Upper Assam while the British ruled in Lower Assam. Purandar Singha was allowed to rule as king of Upper Assam in 1833, but after that brief period Assam was annexed to Bengal by the British. In 1873, British political control was imposed on western Naga communities. On 6 February 1874, Assam, including Sylhet, was severed from Bengal to form the Assam Chief-Commissionership, also known as the 'North-East Frontier'. Shillong was chosen as the capital of the Non-Regulation Province of Assam in September 1874. The Lushai Hills were transferred to Assam in 1897. The new Commissionership included the five districts of Assam proper (Kamrup, Nagaon, Darrang, Sibsagar and Lakhimpur), Khasi-Jaintia Hills, Garo Hills, Naga Hills, Goalpara and Sylhet-Cachar comprising about 54,100 sq miles.

From 16 October 1905, Assam became part of the province of East Bengal and Assam. The province was annulled in 1911 following a sustained mass protest campaign and on 1 April 1912 the two parts of Bengal were reunited and a new partition based on language followed, Oriya and Assamese areas were separated to form new administrative units: Bihar and Orissa Province was created to the west, and Assam Province to the east.

British India's Montagu–Chelmsford Reforms enacted through the Government of India Act 1919 expanded the Assam Legislative Council and introduced the principle of dyarchy, whereby certain responsibilities such as agriculture, health, education, and local government, were transferred to elected ministers. Some of the Indian ministers under the dyarchy scheme were Sir Syed Muhammad Saadulla (education and agriculture 1924–1934) and Rai Bahadur Promode Chandra Dutta (local self-government).

The Government of India Act 1935 provided provincial autonomy and further enlarged the elected provincial legislature to 108 elected members. In 1937, elections were held for the newly created Assam Legislative Assembly established in Shillong. The Indian National Congress had the largest number of seats, with 38 members, but declined to form a government. Therefore, the Assam Valley Party with Muslim League's support Sir Syed Muhammad Saadulla was invited to form a ministry. Saadulla's government resigned in September 1938, after the Congress changed its decision, and the Governor, Sir Robert Neil Reid, then invited Gopinath Bordoloi. Bordoloi's cabinet included the future President of India Fakhruddin Ali Ahmed. During the Japanese invasion of India in 1944, some areas of Assam Province, including the Naga Hills district and part of the Manipur princely state, were occupied by Japanese forces between mid March and July.

When fresh elections to the provincial legislatures were called in 1946, the Congress won a majority in Assam, and Bordoloi was again the chief minister. Prior to the Independence of India, on 1 April 1946, Assam Province was granted self-rule and on 15 August 1947 it became part of the Dominion of India. Bordoloi continued as the chief minister even after India's independence in 1947.

=== Chief commissioners ===
- 1889 – 1891: James Wallace Quinton (b. 1834 – d. 1891)
- 1912 – 1918: Archdale Earle (b. 1861 – d. 1934)
- 1918 – 3 January 1921: Sir Nicholas Dodd Beatson Bell (b. 1867 – d. 1936)

=== Governors ===
- 3 January 1921 – 2 April 1921: Sir Nicholas Dodd Beatson Bell (b. 1867 – d. 1936)
- 3 April 1921 – 10 October 1922: Sir William Sinclair Marris (b. 1873 – d. 1945)
- 10 Oct 1922 – 28 June 1927: Sir John Henry Kerr (b. 1871 – d. 1934)
- 28 Jun 1927 – 11 May 1932: Sir Egbert Laurie Lucas Hammond (b. 1873 – d. 1939)
- 11 May 1932 – 4 March 1937: Sir Michael Keane (b. 1874 – d. 1937)
- 4 March 1937 – 4 May 1942: Robert Neil Reid (b. 1883 – d. 1964)
- 4 May 1942 – 4 May 1947: Sir Andrew Gourlay Clow (b. 1890 – d. 1957)
- 15 Mar 1944 – Jul 1944: Mutaguchi Renya (b. 1888 – d. 1966) Mil (Japanese military commander)
- 16 Mar 1944 – Jul 1944: A. C. Chatterjee IIL (for the provisional government of Free India)
- 4 May 1947 – 15 August 1947: Sir Saleh Hydari (b. 1894 – d. 1948)

=== Chief ministers ===
- 1 April 1937 – 19 September 1938: Sir Syed Muhammad Saadulla (b. 1885 – d. 1955), All-India Muslim League (1st time)
- 19 Sep 1938 – 17 November 1939: Gopinath Bordoloi (b. 1890 – d. 1950) Indian National Congress (1st time)
- 17 Nov 1939 – 24 December 1941: Sir Syed Muhammad Saadulla (b. 1885 – d. 1955), All-India Muslim League (2nd time)
- 24 Dec 1941 – 24 August 1942: Governor's Rule
- 25 Aug 1942 – 11 February 1946: Sir Syed Muhammad Saadulla (b. 1885 – d. 1955), All-India Muslim League (3rd time)
- 11 Feb 1946 – 15 August 1947: Gopinath Bordoloi (b. 1890 – d. 1950) Indian National Congress (2nd time)

=== Deputy commissioners of the Naga Hills District ===
- 1912 – 1913: J. K. Webster
- 1913 – 1917: H. C. Berners
- 1917 – 1935: John Henry Hutton (b. 1885 – d. 1968)
- 1935 – 1937: James Philip Mills (b. 1890 – d. 1960)
- 1937 – 1947: Charles Ridley Pawsey (b. 1894 – d. 1972)

== Administration ==
There were 2 administrative divisions in the province, including the Assam Valley Division, and the Surma Valley Division. There were a total of 14 Districts.

Division	Divisional Headquarters	Districts	Princely states
Assam Valley Division	Guwahati	Goalpara, Kamrup, the Garo Hills, Darrang, Nowgong, Sibsagar and Lakhimpur, Sadiya Frontier District, Balipara Frontier District	Manipur
Surma Valley Division	Silchar	Sylhet, Cachar, the Khasi and Jaintia Hills, the Naga Hills and the Lushai Hills	Khasi States

Manipur under jurisdiction the Assam Valley Division.

== Demographics ==
Religious groups in Assam Province (1941)
Religious group	1941	
Religious group	Pop.	%
Hinduism (Note: 1931 & 1941 censuses: Including Ad-Dharmis)	4,540,950	41.54%
Islam	3,474,141	31.78%
Tribal Religion	2,824,133	25.84%
Christianity	67,184	0.61%
Buddhism	8,317	0.076%
Others	15,663	0.14%
Total population	10,930,388	100%
All figures include Sylhet Division in Bangladesh

== See also ==
- Bengal Presidency
- British rule in the Lushai Hills
- Colonial Assam
- Northeast Frontier Railway zone
- Partition of Bengal
