= Mahendra Mohan Choudhry =

4th Chief Minister of Assam

Governor of Punjab
- In office 21 May 1973 – 1 September 1977
- Chief Minister: Zail Singh; Parkash Singh Badal
- Preceded by: D. C. Pavate
- Succeeded by: Ranjit Singh Narula

4th Chief Minister of Assam
- In office 11 November 1970 – 30 January 1972
- Governor: Braj Kumar Nehru
- Preceded by: Bimala Prasad Chaliha
- Succeeded by: Sarat Chandra Singha

Cabinet Minister of the Government of Assam
- In office 1967–1970
- Chief Minister: Bimala Prasad Chaliha

Speaker of the Assam Legislative Assembly
- In office 9 December 1959 – 19 March 1967
- Preceded by: D. K. Barooah
- Succeeded by: Hareswar Goswami

State Minister of the Government of Assam
- In office 1951–1951
- Chief Minister: Bishnuram Medhi
- In office 1955–1955

Member of Assam Legislative Assembly
- In office 1958–1967
- Constituency: Hajo
- In office 1946–1951
- Constituency: Barpeta

Personal details
- Born: 12 April 1908 Nagaon, Assam, British India
- Died: 27 December 1982 (aged 74) Guwahati, Assam, India
- Occupation: Politician

Mahendra Mohan Choudhury (12 April 1908 – 27 December 1982) was a freedom fighter and politician from Nagaon, Undivided Kamrup district (now Barpeta district) of Western Assam. He was Chief Minister of Assam from 1970 to 1972. He also served as governor of Punjab.

== Early life ==
Mahendra Mohan Choudhury was born on 12 April 1908 in Nagaon, Undivided Kamrup district in an Assamese family. He did his graduation in Arts and subsequently completed his Bachelor of Laws.

== Politics ==
Mahendra Mohan Choudhury was a Gandhian, he fought for the independence of India during the freedom movement and went to jail thrice in 1932, 1941 and in 1945. He was a member of Assam Vidhan Sabha (1946–1952), Parliamentary Secretary (1947), State Minister (1951, 1955), President of Assam Congress Committee, President of Assam Vidhan Sabha (1967), Speaker of the Assam Legislative Assembly (1959–1967), Cabinet Minister (1967–1970), Chief Minister of Assam (1970–1972), and Governor of Punjab.

== Works ==
He wrote books, viz. Mahatma Gandhi and The Philosophy of Binova Bhabe. He was associated with many socio-religious institutions like Sankardev-Kristi Vikash Samiti, Gita Samaj, Madhupur Satra etc. Mahendra Mohan Choudhury was also instrumental in founding the Saint Sankaradeva Chair at Punjabi University, Patiala, Punjab, which had contributed immensely in acquainting the pan-Indian community of scholars with the Life and Works of the Saint.

== Personal life and death ==
Choudhury had six children, 2 sons and four daughters. He died in Gauhati Medical College and Hospital following a heart attack on 27 December 1982.

== See also ==
- Chhatbir Zoo, named after Mahendra Mohan Choudhry
