= Dandi Ram Dutta =

Indian politician

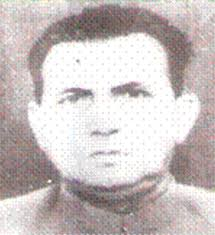

Former Member of Assam Legislative Assembly
- Preceded by: S.P. Sarmah .
- Constituency: Mangaldoi (Vidhan Sabha constituency), Kalaigaon (Vidhan Sabha constituency)

Member of Assam Legislative Assembly (1957–1962) from Mangaldoi (Vidhan Sabha constituency)

Member of Assam Legislative Assembly (1962–1967) from Kalaigaon (Vidhan Sabha constituency)

Personal details
- Party: Indian National Congress
- Children: Bhupen Dutta, Hiren Dutta, Dr. Khanindra Kumar Dutta, Prasenjit Dutta, Ranenjit Dutta, Mira Dutta
- Occupation: Former MLA of Assam Legislative Assembly (nominated) from 1957–62 and 1962–67

Dandi Ram Dutta was an Indian National Congress politician from Assam. He was elected to the Assam Legislative Assembly in the 1957–62 election from Mangaldoi constituency and in 1962–67 election from Kalaigaon (Vidhan Sabha constituency). Dutta was the Deputy Minister of Bimala Prasad Chaliha's Ministry, the then Chief Minister of Assam .
