= Muhammed Saadulah =

Prime Minister of Assam from 1937 to 1946

Sir Syed Muhammad Saadulla
- ছাৰ ছৈয়দ মহম্মদ ছাদুল্লাহ
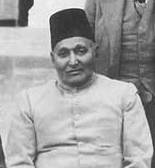
- Official Portrait,1946

Premier of Assam
- In office 1 April 1937 – 11 February 1946 (1 month interruption by Bordoloi govt.)
- Preceded by: Office Established
- Succeeded by: Gopinath Bordoloi

Member of Constituent Assembly of India
- In office 9 December 1946 – 24 January 1950

Personal details
- Born: 21 May 1885 Gauhati, North-East Frontier, British India
- Died: 8 January 1955 (aged 69) Gauhati, Assam, India
- Party: Assam Valley Party (coalition under Assam United Muslim Party and INC later with AIML)
- Education: Cotton College, Guwahati; Presidency College, Calcutta
- Occupation: 1st Prime Minister of Assam Province before independence, politician
- Profession: Lawyer, politician
- Awards: Order of the Indian Empire(1946)

Sir Syed Muhammad Saadulla KCIE (Assamese: ছাৰ ছৈয়দ মহম্মদ ছাদুল্লাহ; 21 May 1885 – 8 January 1955) was the 1st Prime Minister of Assam in British India from 1937 to 1946. He was also the member of Constituent Assembly of India from 1946 to 1950.

Saadulla was knighted in the 1928 Birthday Honours and appointed a Knight Commander of the Order of the Indian Empire (KCIE) in the 1946 Birthday Honours.

== Early life ==
Syed Muhammad Saadulla was born on 21 May 1885 in Guwahati, to an Assamese Muslim family.

His father, Syed Muhammad Tayyabulla, came from Kacharihat, a village near the town of Golaghat, to Guwahati around 1878.

== Lawyer ==
Saadulla, M.A., B.L., became a Pleader in Guwahati and set up practice at Lakhtakia in 1910. In the same year, he married the eldest daughter of Syed Muhammad Saleh of Kacharihat. He soon made his mark as a lawyer. He became chairman, Guwahati Municipality, and was nominated as a member of the Legislative Council at Shillong. Assam became a Chief Commissioners Province in April 1919. Saadulla participated in the council's deliberations, and expressed himself freely and forcefully on the matters of interest of the people of Assam. The qualities of citizenship which inspired him to unselfish efforts for what he believed to be right and patriotic were evident early in his political career.

Preoccupation with legal profession and civic responsibilities and duties of a Legislative Councillor left Saadulla with little time for recreation. Nevertheless, he played association football and cricket for the Town Club regularly at Judge's Field. Most afternoons he played Lawn tennis at the erstwhile Jubilee Gardens, where the regulars were Tarun Ram Phukan, Gopinath Bordoloi and Hemanta Kumar Lahiri.

As his financial circumstances improved, Saadulla purchased a plot of land adjacent to his father's house, where he built a large residence for the joint family and an outbuilding to serve as his office. He became a prominent political figure in Assam. Contemporary accounts described him as energetic, self-confident, analytical, and possessing a strong memory.

In a decade, all ambition has been fulfilled, and Saadulla was recognized as the most conspicuous pleader in Assam. He had the gratification of being able to refuse two offers of important employment under the Government. He became restless and found himself disposed to a change. He consulted his younger brother, Syed Muhibulla, a Professor of Arabic and Persian at Cotton College, Guwahati and asked for the blessings of his 80-year-old father, and prepared to leave for Calcutta.

In 1922, in his mid-thirties, Saadulla enrolled himself as an Advocate at the Calcutta High Court. He rented a house in Turner Street in the neighborhood of A.K. Fazlul Huq, Nawab Ataur Rahman, Barrister Khuda Bux and Nawabzada A.F.M. Abdul Ali. Before long, briefs from Assam for appeal before the High Court began to arrive and once more Saadulla was engrossed in preparing plaints. Success came slowly, but no sooner he was settled in the new establishment his wife and three sons joined him and he spent as much time in their company as possible.

Assam became a Governor's province, under the GOI Act 1833 with an enlarged Legislative Council; and accordingly Elections were held in November 1880. Saadulla decided to concentrate on practice at the Calcutta High Court, and therefore did not enter Assam politics. He came to Guwahati with his family to be at the bed-side of his dying father, Syed Tayyabulla, who died on 22 November 1922. A year later he returned to Assam once more to stand for elections to the Reformed Legislative Council, and was returned with a comfortable majority.

== Politics ==
Towards the end of February, 1924 Saadulla received a letter from Sir Kerr, Governor of Assam offering him a seat in his Council. As the newly elected Legislative Council was due to meet at Shillong on 24 March, there was very little time to decide between Calcutta High Court Bar and Ministership in Assam. Saadulla wrote to the Governor accepting his offer and assuring him of reaching Shillong well in advance of the date of commencement of the Council session. He was sworn in as Minister, and rented a house known as "Rookwood" for his family. In 1924 his wife died at child-birth in the early hours of 9 December. He never really recovered from the cruel shock and profound grief. He never remarried and immersed himself in work and bringing up an infant daughter and looking after three sons.

Elections to the third Reformed council were held in November, 1926, and Saadulla was returned from his constituency by large majority. He was re-appointed as a Minister. The honour of Knighthood was conferred on him in 1928. The following year, Sir Egbert Laurie Lucas Hammond, Governor of Assam invited him to join his Executive Council, as a member for a term of five years.

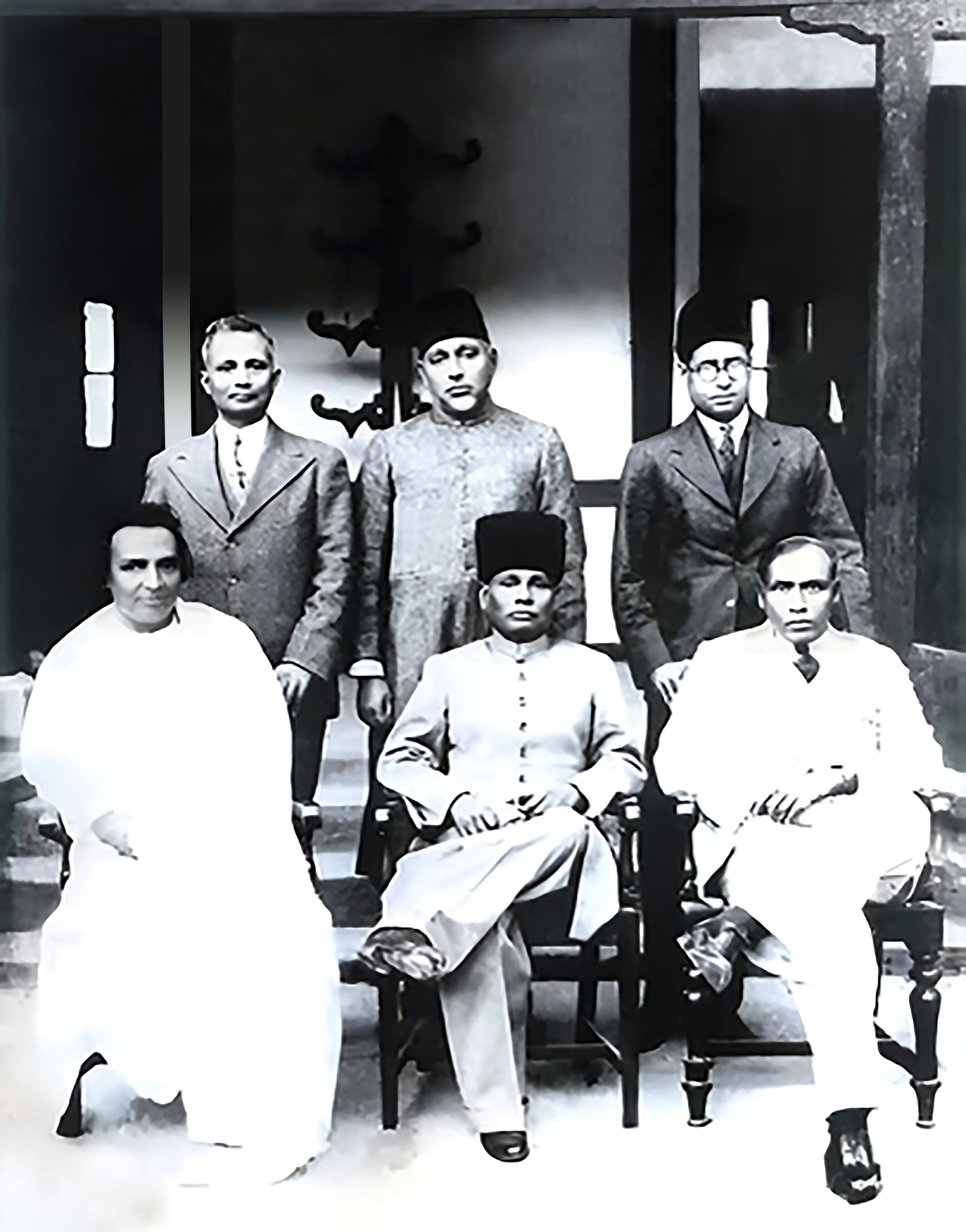
After swearing-in of 2nd coalition Saadulah ministry, February 1938, Standing (l to r) J J M Nichols Roy, Saadulla, Abdul Matin Chaudhury. Seated (l to r) Rohini Kumar Chaudhuri, Munawar Ali, Akshay Kumar Das

After eleven years at Shillong, and disenchanted with Assam politics, Saadula felt that it was time for him to make a move. Opportunity was at hand, Sir John Anderson, Governor of Bengal, had personally offered him a High Court Judgeship. Saadulla went to Calcutta in 1935. Much to his dismay, Sir Harold Darbyshire, the Chief Justice, pointed out that he could not be appointed as a Judge for want of requisite experience of ten years of continuous practice at the Bar. In an effort to assuage his profound disappointment, he was appointed as a Government Pleader with an assurance of elevation to the Bench within a reasonable period. The lure of politics combined with tremendous pressure by former colleagues was too strong for him. A General Election, under the Government of India Act., 1935, was being held in February, 1937. Saadulla returned to Assam and was elected to the Legislative Assembly. The Governor invited him to form the Ministry and he became premier of Assam. He headed the Coalition Ministry from 1 April 1937 to 10 September 1938 and from 17 November 1939 to 25 December 1941 and again from 24 August 1942 to 11 February 1946. These were turbulent years in Assam politics but he performed the onerous task with devotion, enthusiasm and generosity. The honour of Knight Commander of the Order of the Indian Empire (KCIE) was conferred upon him on 1 January 1946.

As Assam premier, Saadulla also undertook land settlement policy to populate the state with migrants from erstwhile East Bengal. Known as the Line System, the policy had its roots in a British effort to extract more revenue from Assam by making the land more productive (since the local peasants were not willing to work for the British). It later ramped up the migration policy under its "grow more food" programme in the build-up to World War II. Saadulla remained a close friend and associate of the Punjab Premier/Chief Minister Sir Sikandar Hayat Khan (in power from 1937 to 1942) and was a member of the executive committee of the All India Muslim League which met in March 1940 to draft the Lahore or Pakistan Resolution.

The Assam Legislative Assembly elected Saadulla to the Constituent Assembly of India in 1947 and the later elected him to the drafting committee. Thus he helped in the preparation of the Constitution of the Republic of India.

He was seriously ill in 1951. He recovered gradually and was restored to health. Thereafter he accepted life in retirement, with social activities, including dispensing hospitality on a magnificent scale.

His health deteriorated, at the approach of winter at Shillong, and to escape the rigours of cold weather, he went down to plains. He died at Guwahati, his birthplace, on 8 January 1955.
