= Andrew Clow =

Sir Andrew Gourlay Clow, KCSI, CIE (29 April 1890 – 31 December 1957) was a British colonial administrator in India. He was a specialist in labour conditions in India. Clow was member for Communications on the Viceroy’s Council until his appointment as Governor of Assam from 1942 to 1947, the last British-born governor.

== Early life ==
Andrew Clow was born in Aberdeen. He was the elder son of Rev. W. M. Clow, a minister of the South Church, Aberdeen. Rev. Clow was also the Principal at the United Free Church College, Glasgow.

== Career ==
He represented the Indian Government as a delegate at the International Labour Conferences at Geneva. He was the Deputy Secretary to the Government of India from 1924 to 1927 and Joint Secretary (Industries and Labour) from 1931 to 1935. From 1938 to 1942, he was a member of the Viceroy's Executive Council responsible for Communications. He was knighted in 1939.

After Indian independence, Clow returned to Britain. At the age of 58, while being the chief of the Scottish Gas Board, he was appointed the member of the new Gas Council. He was a member of the Restrictive Practices Court from 1957.
