= Second Tarun Gogoi ministry =

Government of Assam, India from 2006 to 2011

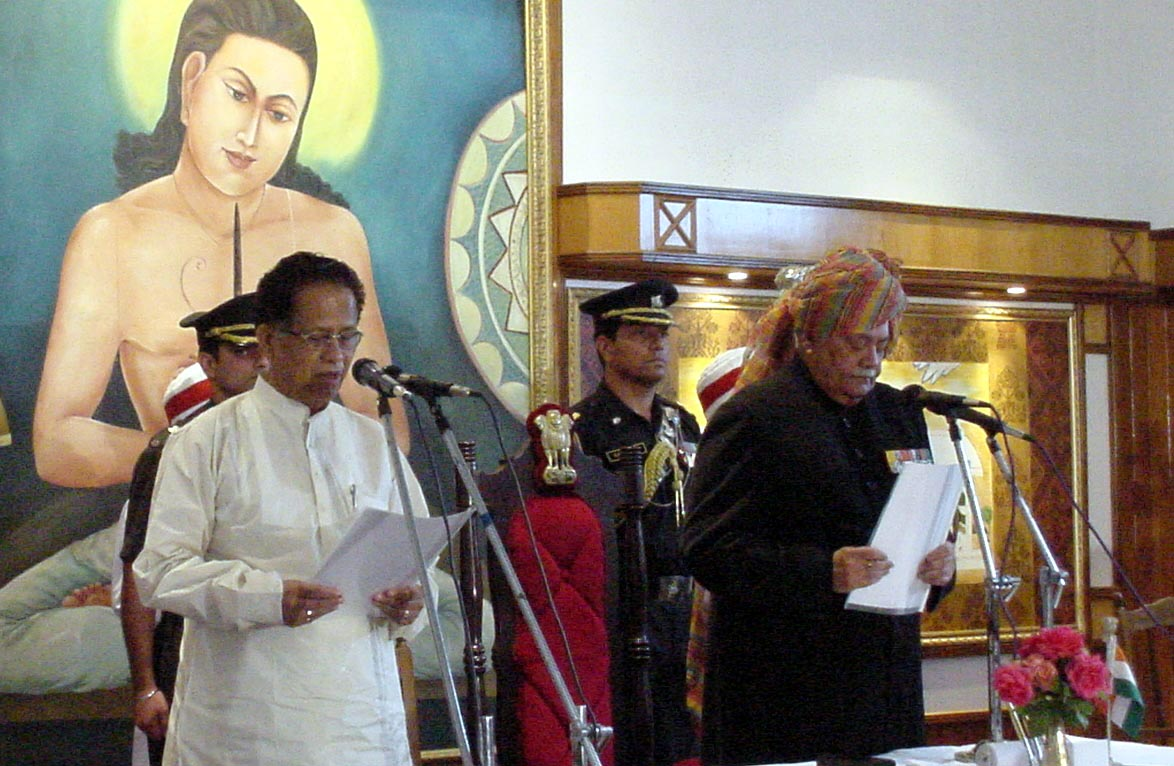
- Tarun Gogoi, being administered the oath of office as Chief Minister of Assam by Governor Ajai Singh at Raj Bhavan, Guwahati on 14 May 2006
- Date formed: 21 May 2006
- Date dissolved: 30 May 2011

People and organisations
- Head of state: Ajai Singh; Shiv Charan Mathur; K. Sankaranarayanan; Syed Sibtey Razi; Janaki Ballabh Patnaik
- Head of government: Tarun Gogoi
- Member parties: INC; IND
- Status in legislature: Coalition
- Opposition party: Asom Gana Parishad; All India United Democratic Front; Bharatiya Janata Party
- Opposition leader: Brindaban Goswami; Chandra Mohan Patowary; Prafulla Kumar Mahanta

History
- Election: 2006
- Outgoing election: 2011
- Legislature term: 5 years
- Predecessor: Tarun Gogoi I
- Successor: Tarun Gogoi III

Tarun Gogoi constituted his ministry for a second time on 21 May 2006. Gogoi had previously been Chief Minister since 2001. Following the 2006 Assam Legislative Assembly election, Gogoi became Chief Minister for a second time as he had formed his first ministry previously. The coalition government was supported by the Hagrama faction of the Bodoland People's Progressive Front, NCP and independents. There were 17 cabinet ministers and one minister of state, all of whom were either Congress or Independent.

Gogoi was sworn on 14 May 2006 at Raj Bhavan. Earlier, Gogoi arrived with his wife Dolly Gogoi and several newly elected MLAs at Raj Bhavan. The oath of office and secrecy was administered to Gogoi by Governor Ajai Singh at a simple function in the Durbar Hall of the Raj Bhavan in Guwahati. Digvijay Singh, who was in charge of Congress affairs in Assam, AICC observer Chandan Bagchi, BPF president Hagrama Mohilary and state Congress president Bhubaneswar Kalita attended the swearing-in ceremony. Asom Gana Parishad president Brindaban Goswami and AGP-Progressive president and former Chief Minister Prafulla Kumar Mahanta were also present. The opposition BJP and AIUDF were absent. Gogoi allotted the portfolios to his ministers on 21 May 2006.

During the ministry the law and order situation abruptly improved and the financial condition of the state improved. Gogoi gave importance to implementation of the schemes of the Central Government by different departments of the state. He also gave importance for industrialization of the state. He also took initiative to solve the insurgency problems of Assam through negotiation.

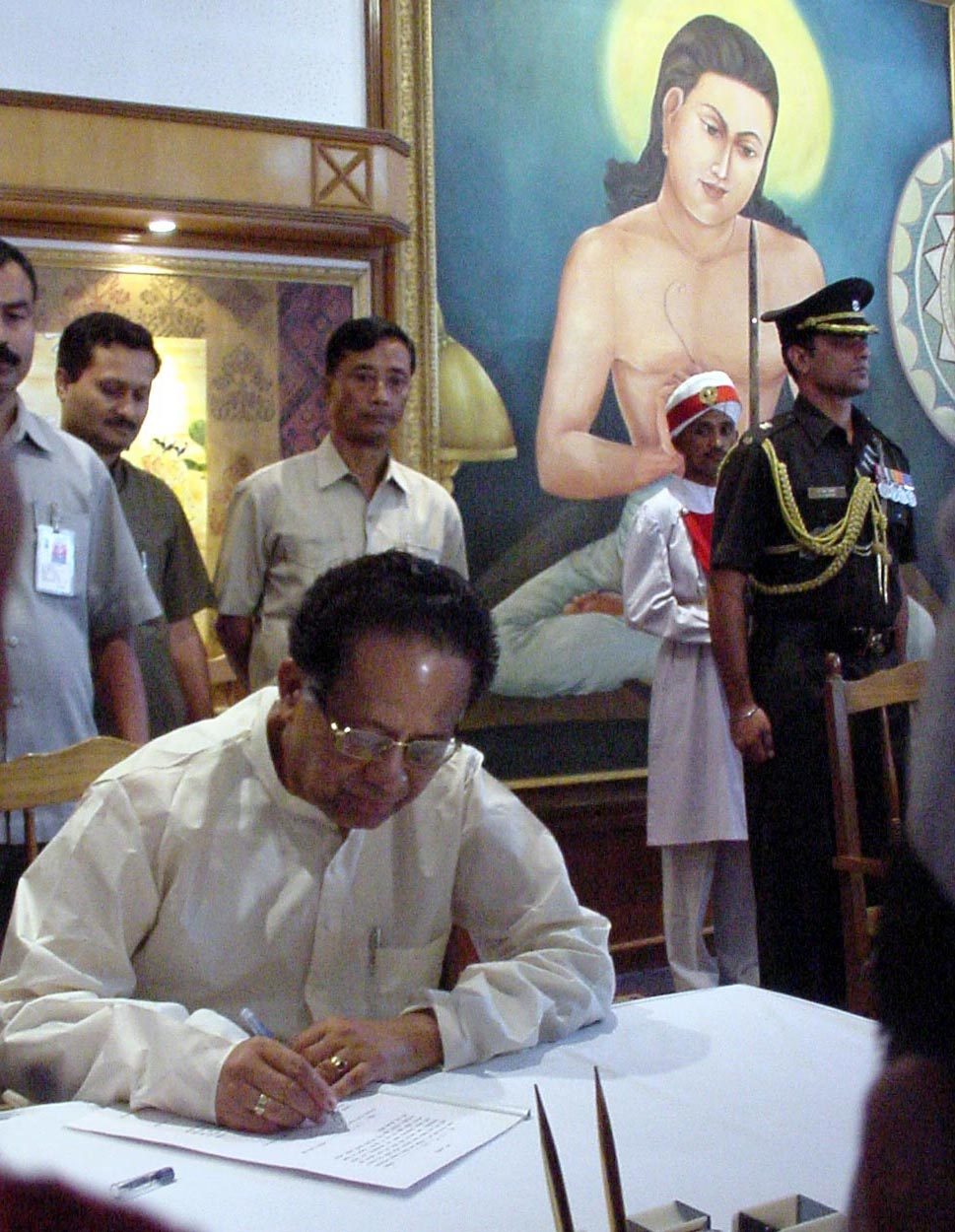
Tarun Gogoi, signing a document after his swearing in as Chief Minister for the second time at Raj Bhavan, Guwahati on 14 May 2006

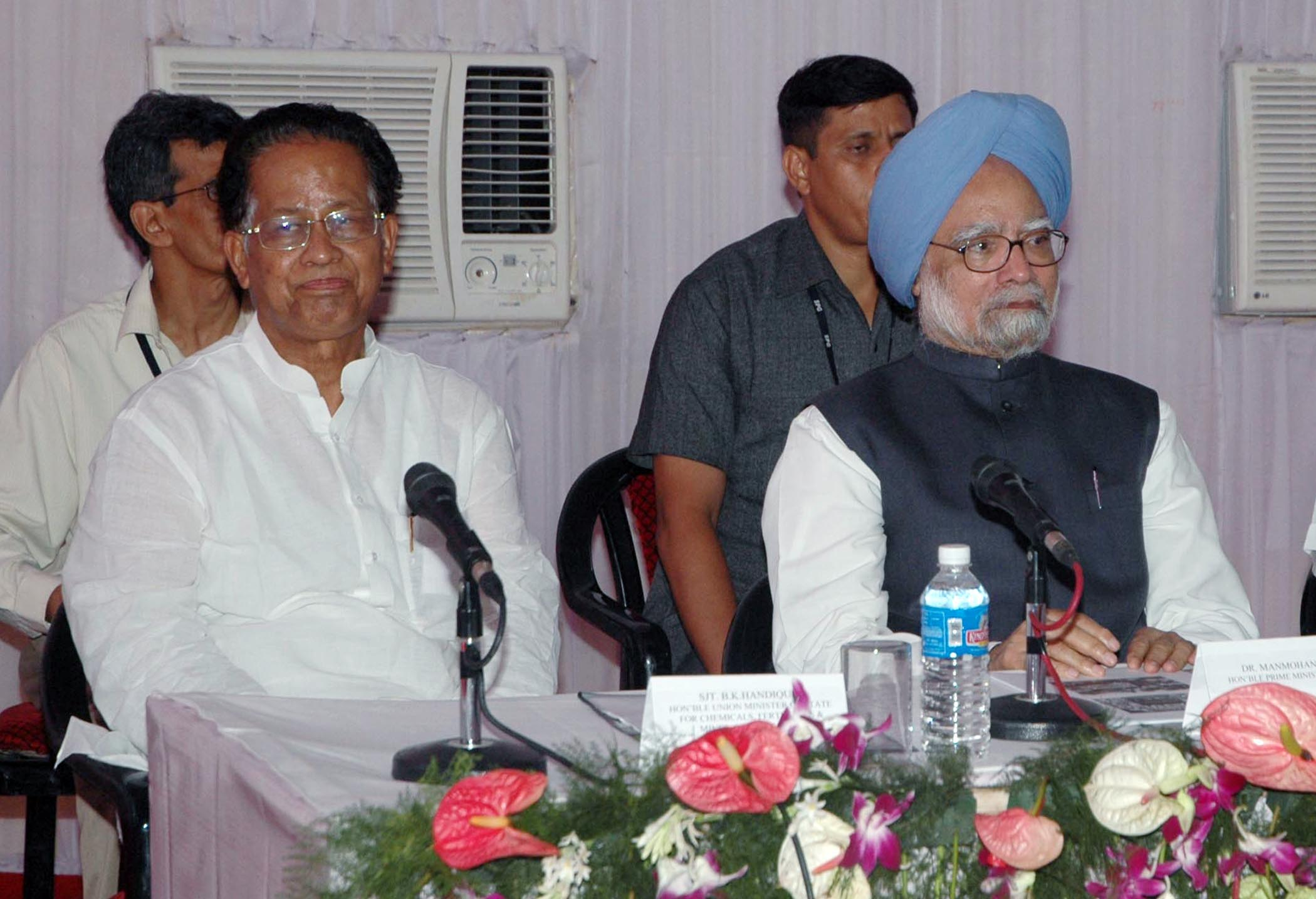
Gogoi with Prime Minister Manmohan Singh during a meeting at Jorhat on 25 August 2008

== Ministers ==
Portfolio	Minister	Took office	Left office	Party
Chief Minister and also in-charge of: Department of Home; Department of Political; Department of Personnel; Department of Finance; General Administration Department; Secretariat Administration Department; Department of Election; Department of Passport; All other departments not allocated to any other Minister.	Tarun Gogoi	14 May 2006	18 May 2011	INC
Minister of Public Works Development	Tarun Gogoi	21 May 2006	3 September 2008	INC
Minister of Public Works Development	Ajanta Neog	3 September 2008	18 May 2011	INC
Minister of Revenue and Disaster Management; Minister of Relief and Rehabilitation; Minister of Administrative Reforms and Training; Minister of Implementation of Assam Accord	Bhumidhar Barman	21 May 2006	18 May 2011	INC
Minister of Planning and Development; Minister of Labour and Employment; Minister of Tea Tribes Welfare	Prithibi Majhi	21 May 2006	18 May 2011	INC
Minister of Parliamentary Affairs	Bharat Narah	21 May 2006	18 May 2011	INC
Minister of Water Resources	Bharat Narah	21 May 2006	3 September 2008	INC
Minister of Water Resources	Prithibi Majhi	3 September 2008	18 May 2011	INC
Minister of Agriculture; Minister of Welfare of Plain Tribes and Backward Classes	Pramila Rani Brahma	21 May 2006	18 May 2011	BPF
Minister of Excise; Minister of Border Areas Development	Gautam Roy	21 May 2006	18 May 2011	INC
Minister of Urban Development and Housing	Dinesh Prasad Goala	21 May 2006	18 May 2011	INC
Minister of Panchayat and Rural Development; Minister of Transport	Chandan Brahma	21 May 2006	18 May 2011	IND
Minister of Hill Areas Development; Minister of Mines and Minerals; Minister of Animal Husbandry and Veterinary	Khorsing Engti	21 May 2006	18 May 2011	INC
Minister of Irrigation; Minister of Soil Conservation; Minister of Fisheries	Nurjamal Sarkar	21 May 2006	18 May 2011	INC
Minister of Food and Civil Supplies; Minister of Welfare of Minorities; Minister of Haj	Nazrul Islam	21 May 2006	18 May 2011	INC
Minister of Cultural Affairs; Minister of Sports and Youth Welfare; Minister of Co-operation	Gautam Bora	21 May 2006	3 September 2008	INC
Minister of Cultural Affairs; Minister of Sports and Youth Welfare; Minister of Co-operation	Bharat Narah	3 September 2008	18 May 2011	INC
Minister of Industries and Commerce; Minister of Power; Minister of Public Enterprises	Pradyut Bordoloi	21 May 2006	18 May 2011	INC
Minister of Education	Ripun Bora	21 May 2006	3 June 2008	INC
Minister of Education	Bhumidhar Barman (Higher Education)	18 June 2008	3 September 2008	INC
Minister of Education	Gautam Bora (Elementary Education)	18 June 2008	3 September 2008	INC
Minister of Education	Ajanta Neog (Technical Education)	18 June 2008	3 September 2008	INC
Minister of Education	Gautam Bora	3 September 2008	18 May 2011	INC
Minister of Education	Tarun Gogoi (Technical Education)	3 September 2008	18 May 2011	INC
Minister of Handloom, Textiles and Sericulture; Minister of Judicial, Legislative and Law	Pranab Gogoi	21 May 2006	18 May 2011	INC
Minister of Health and Family Welfare; Minister of Guwahati Development Department; Minister of Information Technology; Minister of Science and Technology	Himanta Biswa Sarma	21 May 2006	18 May 2011	INC
Minister of Environment and Forest; Minister of Tourism; Minister of Printing and Stationery; Minister of Information and Public Relations	Rakibul Hussain	21 May 2006	18 May 2011	INC
Minister of Social Welfare; Minister of Jails	Ajanta Neog	21 May 2006	3 September 2008	INC
Minister of Social Welfare; Minister of Jails	Akon Bora	3 September 2008	18 May 2011	INC
Minister of State (Independent Charge) for Public Health Engineering	Rihon Daimary	21 May 2006	18 May 2011	BPF
