= Tarun Gogoi ministry =

Tarun Gogoi ministry may refer to these cabinets headed by Indian politician Tarun Gogoi as chief minister of Assam:

- First Tarun Gogoi ministry (2001–2006)
- Second Tarun Gogoi ministry (2006–2011)
- Third Tarun Gogoi ministry (2011–2016)
