= First Tarun Gogoi ministry =

Government of Assam, India from 2001 to 2006

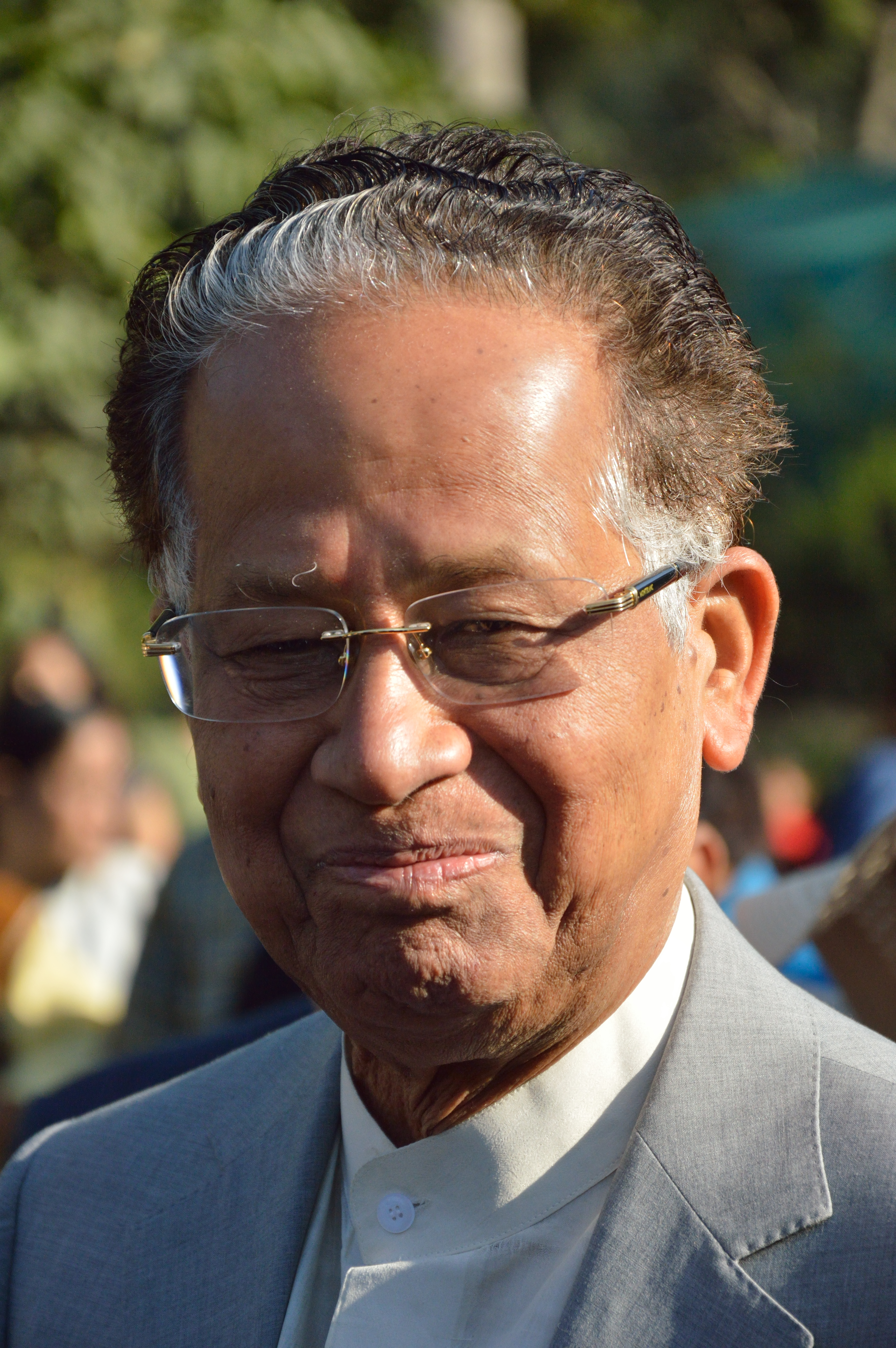
- Tarun Gogoi, Chief Minister of Assam
- Date formed: 17 May 2001
- Date dissolved: 21 May 2006

People and organisations
- Head of state: Srinivas Kumar Sinha; Arvind Dave; Ajai Singh
- Head of government: Tarun Gogoi
- Member party: INC
- Opposition party: AGP; BJP

History
- Election: 2001
- Outgoing election: 2006
- Legislature term: 5 years
- Predecessor: Mahanta II
- Successor: Tarun Gogoi II

Tarun Gogoi constituted his first ministry and became the 13th Chief Minister of Assam on 17 May 2001. Following the 2001 Assam Legislative Assembly election, Gogoi became Chief Minister succeeding AGP chief minister Prafulla Kumar Mahanta. There were 12 cabinet ministers and 4 ministers of state in the ministry.

Gogoi along with his cabinet was sworn in by governor Srinivas Kumar Sinha, succeeding Prafulla Kumar Mahanta as Chief Minister of Assam on 18 May 2001. The hour-long ceremony took place at Raj Bhavan at 14:00. Prafulla Kumar Mahanta and Bhubaneswar Kalita, who challenged Gogoi's claim to become Chief Minister in the wake of the election results, both did not attend the ceremony. No BJP or AGP legislators attended the ceremony either. Among those who attended were Congress General Secretary in charge of Assam Kamal Nath, AICC member Jagdish Tytler and several Congress MPs from Assam.

The cabinet had two female ministers, including Hemoprova Saikia who was the wife of former Chief Minister Hiteswar Saikia. The cabinet also included former Chief Minister of Assam Bhumidhar Barman. 10 of the 17 ministers had been ministers in previous Congress governments in Assam. Gogoi stated that he held out hope for the newly elected MLAs, and stated that he would carry out an expansion of the ministry in a month. The expansion took place on 7 June 2002. The expansion included several newly elected MLAs including Robin Bordoloi, son of the first Chief Minister of Assam Gopinath Bordoloi, and Himanta Biswa Sarma who is the current Chief Minister of Assam.

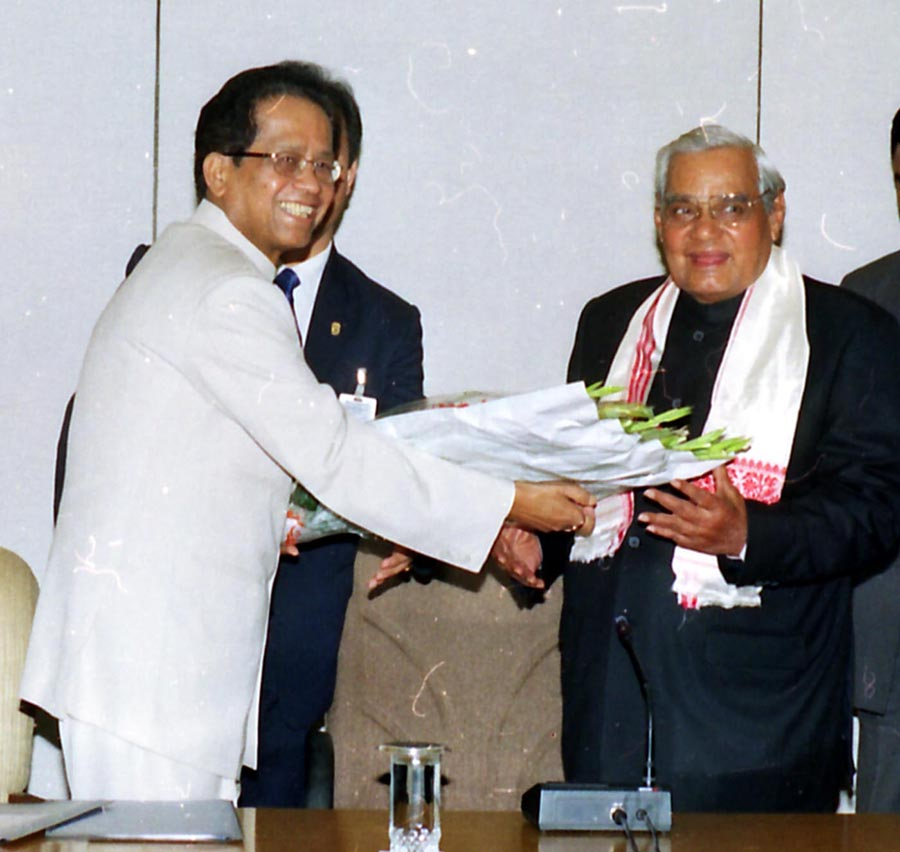
Gogoi with Prime Minister Atal Bihari Vajapayee in New Delhi on 12 December 2003

During the ministry self employment schemes to counter terrorism, the Police Commission for smooth functioning of administration of State, the Chief Vigilance Commission to prevent corruption and the right to information bill were all established.

== Ministers ==
=== Cabinet Ministers ===
Cabinet members
Portfolio	Minister	Took office	Left office	Party
Chief Minister and also in-charge of: Department of Home; Department of Political; Department of Personnel; General Administration Department; Secretariat Administration Department; Department of Science and Technology; Department of Information Technology	Tarun Gogoi	17 May 2001	21 May 2006	INC
Minister of Tourism	Tarun Gogoi	17 May 2001	7 June 2002	INC
Minister of Tourism	Misbahul Islam Laskar, MoS (I/C)	7 June 2002	21 May 2006	INC
Minister of Relief and Rehabilitation	Tarun Gogoi, CM	17 May 2001	7 June 2002	INC
Minister of Relief and Rehabilitation	Robin Bordoloi, MoS (I/C)	7 June 2002	11 September 2004	INC
Minister of Relief and Rehabilitation	Gautam Roy	17 May 2001	7 June 2002	INC
Minister of Health and Family Welfare	Bhumidhar Barman	17 May 2001	21 May 2006	INC
Minister of Panchayat and Rural Development	Bhumidhar Barman	17 May 2001	7 June 2002	INC
Minister of Panchayat and Rural Development	Ripun Bora, MoS (I/C)	7 June 2002	21 May 2006	INC
Minister of Public Works	Sarat Barkotoky	17 May 2001	21 May 2006	INC
Minister of Excise	Sarat Barkotoky	17 May 2001	7 June 2002	INC
Minister of Excise	Rameswar Dhanowar	7 June 2002	11 September 2004	INC
Minister of Excise	Sarat Barkotoky	11 September 2004	21 May 2006	INC
Minister of Town and Country Planning	Sarat Barkotoky	17 May 2001	7 June 2002	INC
Minister of Municipal Administration	Anjan Dutta, MoS (I/C)	17 May 2001	7 June 2002	INC
Minister of Urban Development and Housing	Hemprakash Narayan	7 June 2002	21 May 2006	INC
Minister of Handloom, Textiles and Sericulture	Hemoprova Saikia	17 May 2001	21 May 2006	INC
Minister of Fisheries	Hemoprova Saikia	17 May 2001	7 June 2002	INC
Minister of Fisheries	Bharat Narah	7 June 2002	21 May 2006	INC
Minister of Cultural Affairs	Hemoprova Saikia	17 May 2001	7 June 2002	INC
Minister of Cultural Affairs	Tarun Gogoi, CM	7 June 2002	21 May 2006	INC
Minister of Hill Areas Development; Minister of Mines and Minerals	Gobinda Chandra Langthasa	17 May 2001	21 May 2006	INC
Minister of Environment and Forest	Gobinda Chandra Langthasa	17 May 2001	7 June 2002	INC
Minister of Environment and Forest	Pradyut Bordoloi, MoS (I/C)	7 June 2002	21 May 2006	INC
Minister of Labour and Employment	Rameswar Dhanowar	17 May 2001	7 June 2002	INC
Minister of Labour and Employment	Rupam Kurmi	7 June 2002	4 February 2004	INC
Minister of Labour and Employment	Tarun Gogoi, CM	5 February 2004	11 September 2004	INC
Minister of Labour and Employment	Rameswar Dhanowar	11 September 2004	21 May 2006	INC
Minister of Power	Devanand Konwar	17 May 2001	11 September 2004	INC
Minister of Power	Tarun Gogoi, CM	11 September 2004	21 May 2006	INC
Minister of Finance	Devanand Konwar	17 May 2001	7 June 2002	INC
Minister of Finance	Tarun Gogoi, CM	7 June 2002	21 May 2006	INC
Minister of Revenue	Devanand Konwar	17 May 2001	7 June 2002	INC
Minister of Revenue	Mithius Tudu	7 June 2002	21 May 2006	INC
Minister of Public Health Engineering; Minister of Judicial, Legislative and Law	Dinesh Prasad Goala	17 May 2001	21 May 2006	INC
Minister of Water Supply	Dinesh Prasad Goala	17 May 2001	7 June 2002	INC
Minister of Water Supply	Nurjamal Sarkar	7 June 2002	11 September 2004	INC
Minister of Agriculture	Ardhendu Kumar Dey	17 May 2001	21 May 2006	INC
Minister of Food and Civil Supplies	Ardhendu Kumar Dey	17 May 2001	7 June 2002	INC
Minister of Food and Civil Supplies	Nazrul Islam	7 June 2002	21 May 2006	INC
Minister of Social Welfare	Gautam Roy	17 May 2001	21 May 2006	INC
Minister of Sports and Youth Welfare	Gautam Roy	17 May 2001	7 June 2002	INC
Minister of Sports and Youth Welfare	Robin Bordoloi, MoS (I/C)	7 June 2002	11 September 2004	INC
Minister of Sports and Youth Welfare	Pradyut Bordoloi, MoS (I/C)	11 September 2004	21 May 2006	INC
Minister of Parliamentary Affairs; Minister of Welfare of Plain Tribes and Backward Classes	Bharat Narah	17 May 2001	21 May 2006	INC
Minister of Flood Control	Bharat Narah	17 May 2001	7 June 2002	INC
Minister of Flood Control	Nurjamal Sarkar	7 June 2002	11 September 2004	INC
Minister of Flood Control	Ismail Hussain	11 September 2004	21 May 2006	INC
Minister of Co-operation	Bharat Narah	17 May 2001	7 June 2002	INC
Minister of Co-operation	Misbahul Islam Laskar, MoS (I/C)	7 June 2002	21 May 2006	INC
Minister of Soil Conservation	Ismail Hussain	17 May 2001	21 May 2006	INC
Minister of Irrigation	Ismail Hussain	17 May 2001	7 June 2002	INC
Minister of Irrigation	Nurjamal Sarkar	7 June 2002	11 September 2004	INC
Minister of Irrigation	Ismail Hussain	11 September 2004	21 May 2004	INC
Minister of Char Areas Development; Minister of Minority Welfare, Wakf Board and Haj Affairs	Ismail Hussain	17 May 2001	7 June 2002	INC
Minister of Char Areas Development; Minister of Minority Welfare, Wakf Board and Haj Affairs	Wazed Ali Choudhury, MoS (I/C)	7 June 2002	21 May 2006	INC
Minister of Industries and Commerce; Minister of Public Enterprises	Ismail Hussain	17 May 2001	7 June 2002	INC
Minister of Industries and Commerce; Minister of Public Enterprises	Bhubaneswar Kalita	7 June 2002	11 September 2004	INC
Minister of Industries and Commerce; Minister of Public Enterprises	Anjan Dutta	11 September 2004	21 May 2006	INC
Minister of Animal Husbandry and Veterinary	Hemprakash Narayan	17 May 2001	7 June 2002	INC
Minister of Animal Husbandry and Veterinary	Gobinda Chandra Langthasa	7 June 2002	21 May 2006	INC
Minister of Implementation of Assam Accord	Hemprakash Narayan	17 May 2001	7 June 2002	INC
Minister of Implementation of Assam Accord	Pankaj Bora	7 June 2002	11 September 2004	INC
Minister of Education	Hemprakash Narayan	17 May 2001	7 June 2002	INC
Minister of Education	Pankaj Bora	7 June 2002	11 September 2004	INC
Minister of Education	Hemprakash Narayan (Secondary Education)	11 September 2004	21 May 2006	INC
Minister of Education	Ripun Bora, MoS (I/C) (Elementary Education)	11 September 2004	21 May 2006	INC
Minister of Transport; Minister of Guwahati Development	Anjan Dutta, MoS (I/C)	17 May 2001	7 June 2002	INC
Minister of Transport; Minister of Guwahati Development	Anjan Dutta	7 June 2002	21 May 2006	INC

=== Ministers of State ===
Cabinet members
Portfolio	Minister	Took office	Left office	Party
Minister of State for Handloom, Textiles and Sericulture	Rupam Kurmi	17 May 2001	7 June 2002	INC
Minister of State for Information and Public Relations; Minister of State for Science and Technology; Minister of State for Environment and Forests	Pradyut Bordoloi	17 May 2001	7 June 2002	INC
Minister of State for Industries and Commerce	Pradyut Bordoloi	17 May 2001	7 June 2002	INC
Minister of State for Industries and Commerce	Ananda Ram Barua	7 June 2002	6 July 2004	INC
Minister of State for Home Affairs	Pradyut Bordoloi	17 May 2001	7 June 2002	INC
Minister of State for Home Affairs	Rakibul Hussain	7 June 2002	21 May 2006	INC
Minister of State for Finance	Pradyut Bordoloi	17 May 2001	7 June 2002	INC
Minister of State for Finance	Nilamani Sen Deka	7 June 2002	6 July 2004	INC
Minister of State for Finance	Himanta Biswa Sarma	11 September 2004	21 May 2006	INC
Minister of State for Agriculture	Nazibul Umar	17 May 2001	7 June 2002	INC
Minister of State for Agriculture	Himanta Biswa Sarma	7 June 2002	6 July 2004	INC
Minister of State for Power	Nazibul Umar	17 May 2001	6 July 2004	INC
Minister of State for Power	Ananda Ram Barua	7 June 2002	6 July 2004	INC
Minister of State for Fisheries	Nazibul Umar	17 May 2001	6 July 2004	INC
Minister of State for Fisheries	Atuwa Munda	7 June 2002	6 July 2004	INC
Minister of State for Planning and Development	Himanta Biswa Sarma	7 June 2002	6 July 2004	INC
Minister of State for Planning and Development	Himanta Biswa Sarma	11 September 2004	21 May 2006	INC
Minister of State for Public Works	Atuwa Munda	7 June 2002	6 July 2004	INC
Minister of State for Revenue; Minister of State for Cultural Affairs	Pranati Phukan	7 June 2002	6 July 2004	INC
Minister of State for Border Areas Development; Minister of State for Passport	Rakibul Hussain	7 June 2002	21 May 2006	INC
Minister of State for Political; Minister of State for Information Technology; Minister of State for Printing and Stationery	Rakibul Hussain	11 September 2004	21 May 2006	INC
Minister of State for Health and Family Welfare; Minister of State for Education	Rupsing Ronghang	7 June 2002	6 July 2004	INC
Minister of State for Public Health Engineering; Minister of State for Urban Development	Sukur Ali Ahmed	7 June 2002	6 July 2004	INC
Minister of State for Parliamentary Affairs	Nilamani Sen Deka	7 June 2002	6 July 2004	INC
Minister of State for Food and Civil Supplies; Minister of State for Tourism	Ajanta Neog	7 June 2002	21 May 2006	INC
Minister of State for Transport; Minister of State for Social Welfare	Sarifa Begum	7 June 2002	6 July 2004	INC
Minister of State for Welfare of Plain Tribes and Backward Classes; Minister of State for Labour and Employment	Pranoy Rabha	7 June 2002	6 July 2004	INC
