= Nilamani Sen Deka =

Indian politician

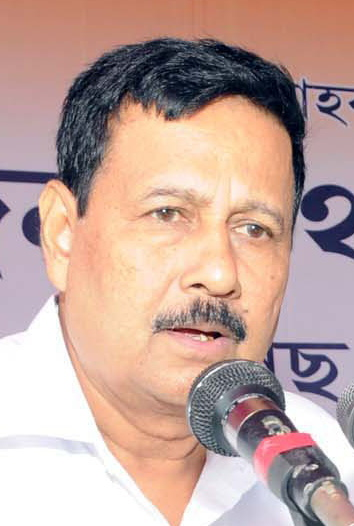
- Sen Deka in 2013

Cabinet Minister, Assam
- In office 30 May 2011 – 26 January 2015
- Chief Minister: Tarun Gogoi
- Departments: Agriculture, Horticulture and Food Processing; Parliamentary Affairs; Irrigation, Soil Conservation (Jul'2014–Jan'2015)
- Preceded by: Pramila Rani Brahma (Agriculture); Bharat Narah (Parliamentary Affairs); Ardhendu Kumar Dey (Irrigation, Soil Conservation)
- Succeeded by: Rakibul Hussain (Agriculture, Parliamentary Affairs); Chandan Kumar Sarkar (Irrigation, Soil Conservation)

Minister of State, Assam
- In office 7 June 2002 – 6 July 2004
- Chief Minister: Tarun Gogoi
- Departments: Finance; Parliamentary Affairs

Member, Assam Legislative Assembly
- In office 13 May 2011 – 19 May 2016
- Preceded by: Chandra Mohan Patowary
- Succeeded by: Chandra Mohan Patowary
- Constituency: Dharmapur
- In office 27 May 2001 – 19 May 2006
- Preceded by: Chandra Mohan Patowary
- Succeeded by: Chandra Mohan Patowary

Personal details
- Born: 1 March 1953 (age 73)
- Party: Indian National Congress (1996-present)
- Other political affiliations: Purbanchaliyo Loka Parishad (1982–1996)
- Spouse: Anulekha Sen Deka
- Children: 2
- Parent(s): Gauri Sen Deka (Father); Tara Sen Deka (Mother)
- Occupation: Politician

Nilamani Sen Deka (born 1 March 1953) is an Indian Politician from the state of Assam. He was a member of Assam Legislative Assembly for Dharmapur from 2001 to 2006 and again from 2011 to 2016. He also served as agriculture minister from 2011 to 2015.

Deka was born in 1953, and did his B.A. and LLB at Gauhati University. Deka's family were considered "left-loyalists" as his uncle was a leader of the Revolutionary Communist Party of India (RCIP). While studying law he had leanings towards the CPI (ML), but during the anti-foreigners movement he joined a regional party. In 1996, when all regional parties supported the AGP, he decided to join the Indian National Congress. He was the Congress candidate for the Dharmapur constituency in 2001 and defeated the incumbent MLA and future Leader of the Opposition Chandra Mohan Patowary. He was made a minister of state in the First Tarun Gogoi cabinet. He unsuccessfully sought reelection in 2006, being defeated by Patowary. However, in 2011, he contested from the Dharmapur constituency again and defeated Patowary. He was made Agriculture and Parliamentary affairs minister in the Third Tarun Gogoi cabinet. During his ministership, his department was considered the most successful department in the state at the time, and received much praise including from the Union Finance Minister for its fiscal reforms. He resigned as minister in 2015 ahead of a cabinet reshuffle and in 2016 he lost his seat to Patowary. Deka was also General Secretary of Assam Pradesh Congress Committee.

However, Deka has received much criticism for controversial statements including remarks he made about Smriti Irani and has been involved in several scandals including a cash-for-job scandal in the Assam civil service involving his son. Deka is also an author and has written numerous books.

== Early life and career ==
Deka was born on 1 March 1953 to the late Gauri Sen Deka and the late Tara Sen Deka. He has a B.A. and LLB from Gauhati University from 1981. His uncle Tarun Sen Deka was a leader of the RCPI and was involved in the arms struggle and later was imprisoned from 1947 to 1952. His uncle was a writer as is his older brother Kanak Sen Deka. His brother served as president of the Assam Sahitya Sabha from 2005 to 2007.

Before Deka entered politics, he was an advocate at a high court. He received international prominence after fighting a legal battle for Dhaniram Baruah, who claimed he transferred the organs of a pig into a human and was able to keep him alive for 7 days.

== Political career ==
=== Early political career ===
While Deka was studying law he had a soft leaning to the Communist Party of India (ML), but in 1982 following the anti-foreigners movement he joined the Purbanchaliyo Loka Parishad, a regional party. After all regional parties supported the Asom Gana Parishad, in 1996 he joined Indian National Congress.

Deka was the Indian National Congress candidate for the seat of Dharmapur in the 1996 Assam Legislative Assembly election. Deka received 17339 votes, 25.56% of the total vote. He was defeated by the incumbent MLA, Chandra Mohan Patowary, by 30555 votes.

Deka was again the Indian National Congress candidate for Dharmapur in the 2001 Assam Legislative Assembly election. He received 37674 votes, 50.64% of the total vote. He defeated Patowary by 1451 votes and became the MLA of the constituency. He was made a minister of state in the First Tarun Gogoi cabinet.

Deka sought reelection in the 2006 Assam Legislative Assembly election in Dharmapur. He received 42372 votes, and was defeated by Patowary again by 9554 votes.

He was again the Indian National Congress candidate for Dharmapur in the 2011 Assam Legislative Assembly election. He received 50786 votes, 51.34% of the total vote and again became MLA of the constituency. He defeated Patowary by 5331 votes.

=== Ministership ===
Two weeks after Deka's election, he was inducted into the Tarun Gogoi cabinet. He was made Minister for Agriculture, Horticulture, Food Processing and Parliamentary Affairs.

On 24 July 2012, Deka along with Prithibi Majhi were directed to visit Kokrajhar by Chief Minister Tarun Gogoi, amid growing violence between Kokrajhar and Chirang.

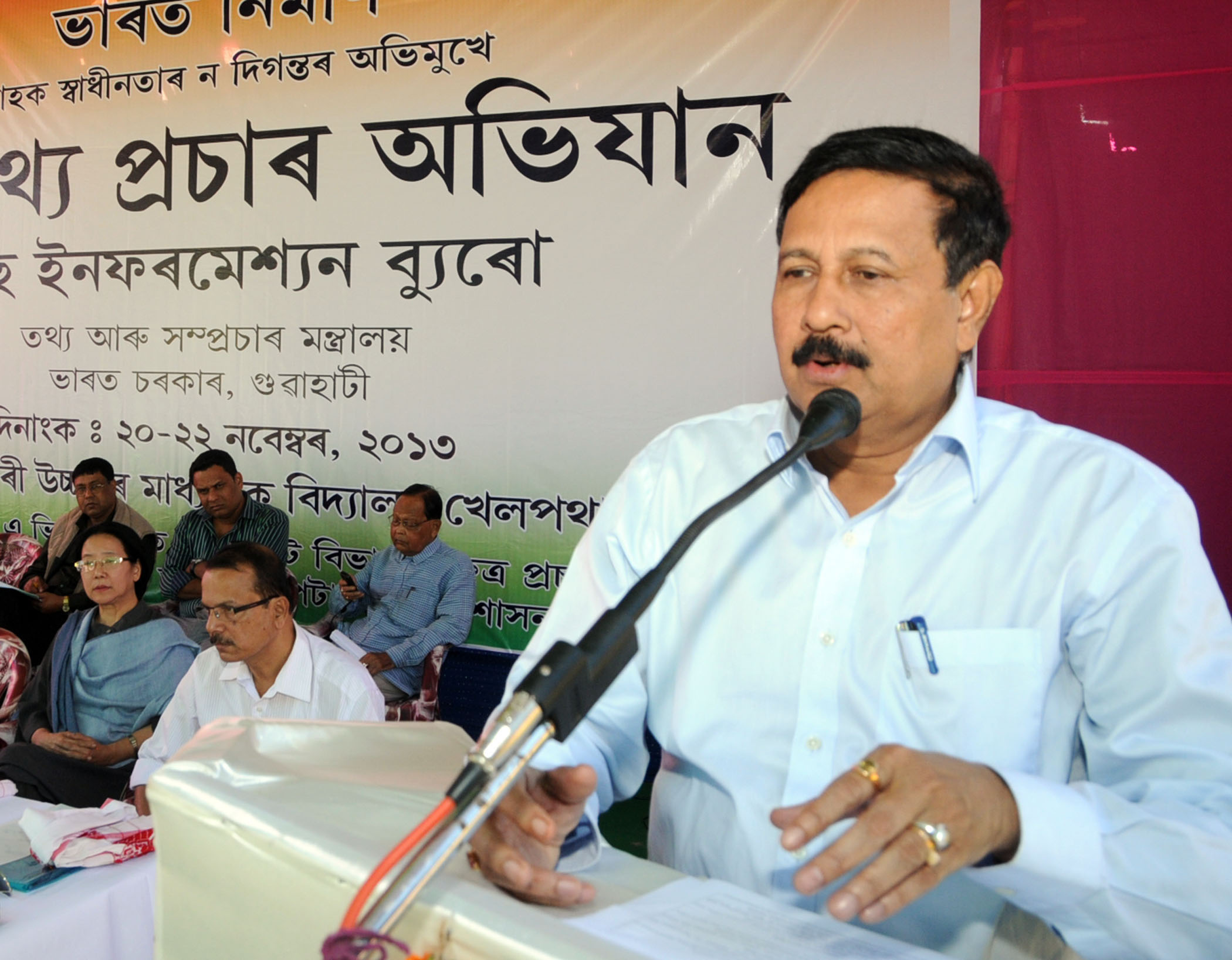
Deka addressing a public information campaign on bharat nirman on 22 November 2013

On 6 August 2014, following the drought situation in 14 Assam districts, Deka directed his department officials to take all measures to tackle the situation and sought detailed reports from deputy commissioners and the agriculture officials of the affected districts.

On 7 August 2014, the Assam government submitted proposals of around Rs 605.16 crore to the Central government for Multi-sectoral Development Programme, the state Assembly was informed today. Deka said the submitted proposals are "under consideration of the Ministry of Minority Affairs".

On 13 August 2014, Deka addressed the state Assembly on the 9100 people that had tested positive for HIV. He also informed the Assembly that Assam State AIDS Control Society is implementing the National AIDS Control Programme as per the Department of AIDS Control's plan to prevent further spread of the disease. He also stated that 6 people had died of Malaria.

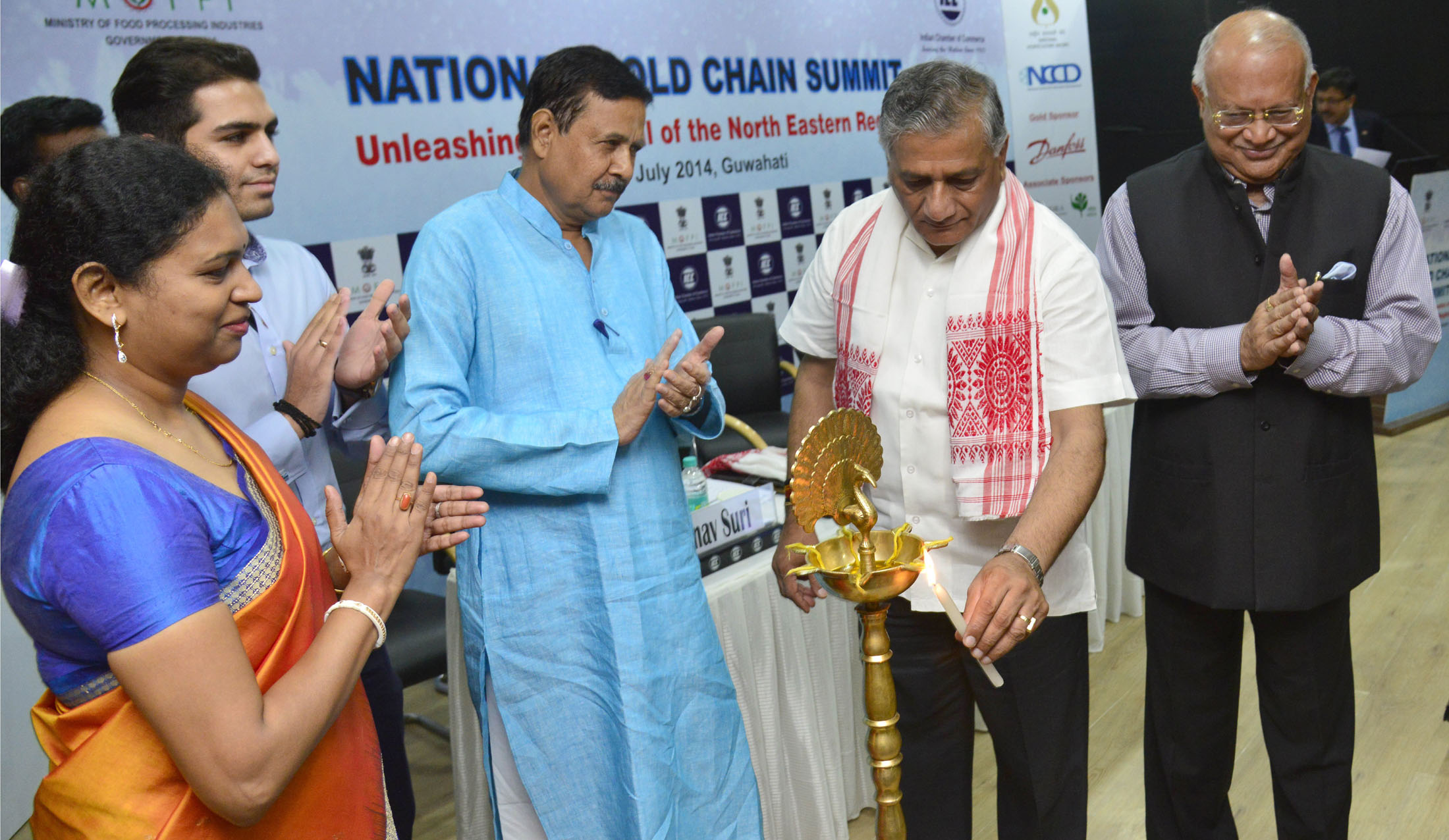
Deka with the minister of state V. K. Singh lighting a lamp to inaugurate the “National Cold Chain Summit 2014” on 12 July 2014 in Guwahati

On 30 August 2014, all opposition members walked out of the assembly in due to not having discussion on the violence in Golgahat. Deka replied by stating the two issues could not be discussed as per law for they were sub-judice with Opposition AGP's Jagadish Bhuyan and Zoii Nath Sarma filing a PIL in the Gauhati High Court on August 25 on the incident of police firing at Rangajan in Golaghat district on August 19 and 20.

On 15 December 2014, The Assam government tabled legislation that prevented a court from granting anticipatory bail to any person apprehending arrest in connection with an offence under the Assam protection of interests of depositors. Deka introduced the Assam Protection of Interests of Depositors (in Financial Establishments) (Amendment) Bill, 2014 in the state Assembly.

The following day on 16 December The state government will brought a resolution in the assembly by requesting the centre for proper implementation of the Assam Accord. This was stated by Deka in the House after a discussion by Opposition AGP on the non-implementation of the accord signed in 1985 by then prime minister Rajiv Gandhi and leaders of the Assam agitation.

On 19 January 2015, Deka along with all of the cabinet resigned from their ministries ahead of a cabinet reshuffle. The new ministry was inducted on the 23 January and Deka was not included. He was succeeded by Rakibul Hussain.

=== Post-ministership ===
In the 2016 Assam Legislative Assembly election, Deka sought reelection in Dharmapur. He received 36560 votes, 32.95% of the total vote. He lost to Chandra Mohan Patowary again by 33943 votes. He was not the Congress candidate for Dharmapur in 2021.

== Personal life ==
Deka is married to Anulekha Sen Deka and they have 2 sons.

Deka is also an author and writer. Deka has authored 21 books and written more than 300 articles. He enjoys reading books and doing research works relating to political, economics and social aspects of 19th and 20th category. In a 2013 interview with the times of india, he stated "writing is my passion and comes before politics. My interest is writing researched-based books. I have written 18 books so far and 11 of them are research-based." In the same interview he expressed interest in becoming president of the Assam Sahitya Sabha.

== Controversy ==
=== Full-meal remarks ===
On 28 July 2013 Deka stated "a person can have a full meal in the state for Rs 2.50 because of largescale production of rice and vegetables in Assam" while addressing a Planning Commission's report on poverty.

The comment drew much criticism including from Health Minister Himanta Biswa Sarma, who stated "no comment that hurts the common people should be made by anyone. Such controversial comments should be avoided by those in the Congress since their leaders Sonia Gandhi and Rahul Gandhi are making every possible effort to remove poverty from the country. No one should ridicule poverty." Chief Minister Tarun Gogoi distanced himself from the comments, while Prafulla Kumar Mahanta and Sarbananda Sonowal criticised the comments, with Sonowal stating "Congress is promoting syndicate and allowing criminals and racketeers to control the market. That is why it is possible for Congress ministers and MLAs to get food without paying a single penny. That is why Deka is saying this."

=== Missing woman disappearance ===
On 13 January 2015, Assam Public Works, an NGO, today alleged that Deka had a role in the disappearance of a young woman from his constituency in lower Assam's Nalbari district 10 years back.

The APW president Abhijit Sarma said Namita Barman, a woman from Deka's constituency Dharmapur, went missing after she had gone to meet Deka on 1 September 2004, to request a government job. She was then 25.

Sarma said a case was registered at Belsor police station based on a complaint lodged by the woman's parents. "Deka has recently said he knows where the woman is. We give him 10 days time to make the whereabouts of the woman public or else we will move court, the governor and Congress president Sonia Gandhi on this issue," said Sarma. Deka, however, denied the allegations and said according to his information, Namita had eloped with a man from a minority community to marry him.

"The police had investigated the case and filed a final report in the court saying the girl had eloped and married a man and since then they have been living together. Whatever APW is saying against me is false. I don't even know the girl," Deka said.

=== Remarks about Smriti Irani ===
On 27 December 2015, Deka made remarks at a public meeting that alleged that the Union Minister of Human Resource Development Smriti Irani was the second wife of Prime Minister Narendra Modi.

Deka's remarks received much criticism, including from Chief Minister Tarun Gogoi who said it was "not in Assamese culture". Deka replied by saying "We criticise the opponents in different languages. While doing so, I made the comment. I regret my statement and withdraw it immediately. I do not want any controversy over it anymore."

Irani, who was on a visit to the state soon after, addressed a workers rally in Nalbari, replied at the ruling Congress in Assam alleging that women's dignity is at stake in Assam and people will give a "befitting reply" in the 2016 assembly polls in the state.

A police complaint was filed against Deka, and BJP supporters held protest in front of the Congress headquarters, calling for his arrest.

=== Agriculture department scandal ===
On 27 January 2017, the CID investigated Deka due to his alleged role in the 700 crore scam in the agriculture department.

=== Cash-for-job scandal ===
On 13 November 2017 Deka's son Rajarshi Sen Deka was arrested in an Assam Public Service Commission scandal. Assam Director General of Police Mukesh Sahay said that Rajarshi Deka had got his job through "unfair means". A Pratidin time report claimed that Rajarshi Deka never wanted to be in the civil service, but Nilamani Sen Deka had used his power as a minister to get his son into the civil service. Rajarshi Deka was later granted bail.

=== Bengali remarks ===
On 13 November 2019, Deka received more criticism for his derogatory remarks about the Bengali community in Assam. A Hojai-based journalist later filed an FIR against Deka.
