= Dispur Assembly constituency =

Constituency of the Assam legislative assembly in India

Dispur
- Constituency No. 52 for the Assam Legislative Assembly

Constituency details
- Country: India
- Region: Northeast India
- State: Assam
- District: Kamrup Metropolitan
- Lok Sabha constituency: Guwahati
- Established: 1978
- Reservation: None
- Elected year: 2021

Dispur is one of the 126 assembly constituencies of Assam a north east state of India. Dispur is also capital of Assam.

== Members of Legislative Assembly ==
Election	Member	Party affiliation
1978	Tarini Mohan Barua	Janata Party
1983	Tarini Mohan Barua	Indian National Congress
1985	Atul Bora	Independent
1991	Atul Bora	Asom Gana Parishad
1996	Atul Bora	Asom Gana Parishad
2001	Robin Bordoloi	Indian National Congress
2006	Akon Bora	Indian National Congress
2011	Akon Bora	Indian National Congress
2016	Atul Bora	Bharatiya Janata Party
2021	Atul Bora	Bharatiya Janata Party
2026	Pradyut Bordoloi	Bharatiya Janata Party

== Election results ==
=== 2026 ===
2026 Assam Legislative Assembly election: Dispur
Party	Candidate	Votes	%	±%
BJP	Pradyut Bordoloi	103,337	55.89	
INC	Mira Borthakur Goswami	53,670	29.03	
Independent	Jayanta Kumar Das	22,802	12.33	
NOTA	NOTA	2,941	1.59	
Margin of victory		49,667	26.86	
Turnout		181,949	76.0	
Registered electors		243,176		
BJP hold		Swing		

=== 2021 ===
2021 Assam Legislative Assembly election: Dispur
Party	Candidate	Votes	%	±%
BJP	Atul Bora	196,043	64	−7.14
INC	Manjit Mahanta	74,386	24.28	−0.17
AJP	Prince Faizul Haque	15,636	5.1	
Independent	Shailesh Kalita	5,148	1.68	
NOTA	None of the above	5,782	1.89	+0.96
Other candidates	Smaller parties and independents	9,323	3.05	−
Majority		1,21,657	39.72	−9.94
Turnout		3,06,318	74.33	−3.65
Registered electors		4,12,114		
BJP hold		Swing		

=== 2016 ===
2016 Assam Legislative Assembly election: Dispur
Party	Candidate	Votes	%	±%
BJP	Atul Bora	198,378	71.14	+56.63
INC	Akon Bora	68,181	24.45	−17.03
CPI(M)	Sangita Das	1,944	0.70	−0.95
Independent	Hareswar Rahang	1,756	0.63	+0.63
NCP	Pradip Baruah	1,259	0.45	+0.12
NOTA	None of the Above	2,600	0.93	+0.93
Majority		1,30,197	46.69	+42.58
Turnout		2,78,869	77.98	+13.21
BJP gain from INC		Swing	+29.65	

== See also ==
- Dispur
- List of constituencies of Assam Legislative Assembly
