= Third Tarun Gogoi ministry =

Government of Assam, India from 2011 to 2016

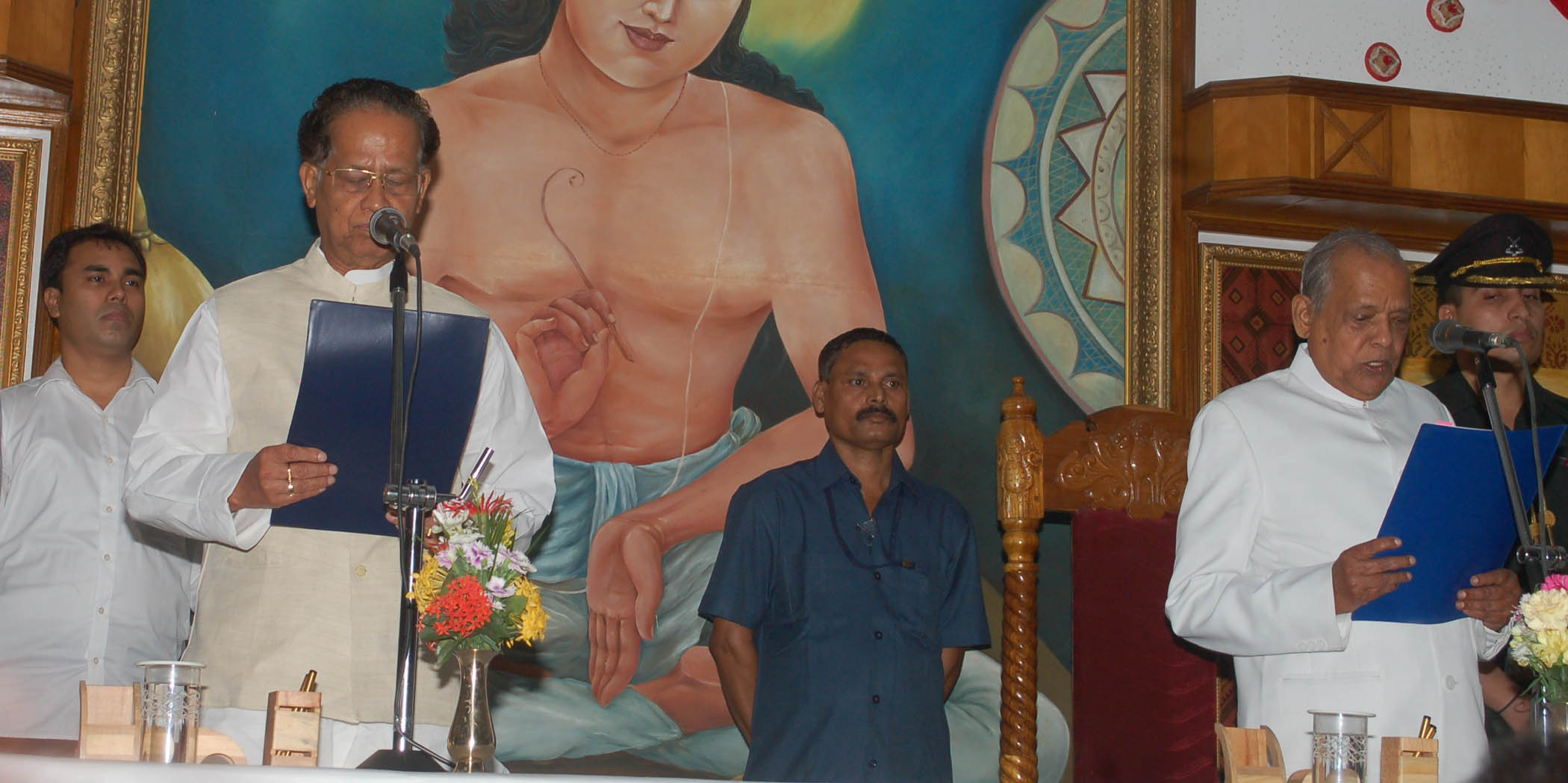
- Tarun Gogoi, being administered the oath of office as Chief Minister of Assam by Governor Janaki Ballabh Patnaik in Guwahati on 18 May 2011
- Date formed: 30 May 2011
- Date dissolved: 24 May 2016

People and organisations
- Head of state: Janaki Ballabh Patnaik (until 10 Dec. 2014); Padmanabha Acharya (from 10 Dec. 2014)
- Head of government: Tarun Gogoi
- Member parties: United Progressive Alliance: Indian National Congress; Bodoland People's Front (until 2014)
- Opposition party: Asom Gana Parishad
- Opposition leader: Prafulla Kumar Mahanta

History
- Election: 2011
- Outgoing election: 2016
- Legislature term: 5 years
- Predecessor: Tarun Gogoi II
- Successor: Sonowal

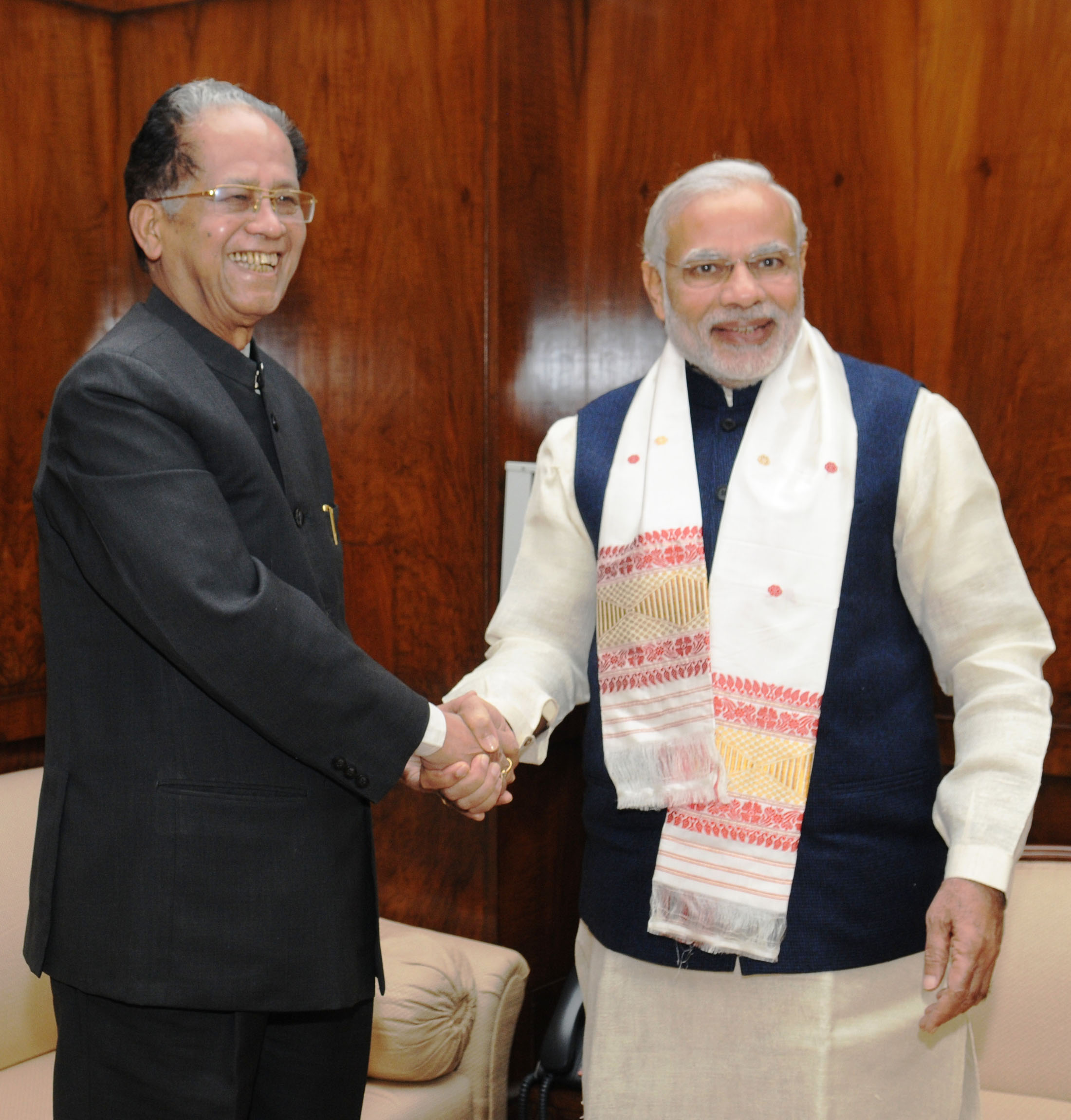
Gogoi with Prime Minister Narendra Modi in New Delhi on 16 December 2015

The Third Tarun Gogoi ministry is the third consecutive council of ministers of the Government of Assam headed by Chief Minister Tarun Gogoi between 2011 and 2016. The ministry was constituted on 30 May 2011 after Tarun Gogoi was sworn-in as the chief minister of the state for the third consecutive term after leading the Indian National Congress into victory in the assembly election. The ministry remained into force until 24 May 2016.

== Background ==
The 2011 Assam Legislative Assembly election which took place in two phases on 4 and 11 April 2011 resulted in the ruling Indian National Congress under the leadership of Chief Minister Tarun Gogoi winning the majority of seats by increasing its seat tally from 53 (in the outgoing assembly) to 78, while its coalition partner, the Bodoland People's Front won 12 seats. The All India United Democratic Front emerged as the single largest party after the Congress winning 18 seats in the assembly. The principal opposition party, the Asom Gana Parishad won only 10 seats and the Bharatiya Janata Party won 5 seats. One seat was won by the All India Trinamool Congress while two independent candidates were also victorious.

After leading his party to an overwhelming victory, Gogoi was elected as the chief minister of the state for the third term by the Congress leadership and was sworn-in into office on 18 May 2021 by Governor Janaki Ballabh Patnaik. The cabinet was expanded on 30 May 2021 when 18 ministers were inducted.

== Swearing-in ceremony ==
Tarun Gogoi was sworn-in as the chief minister of the state on 18 May 2011 by Governor Janaki Ballabh Patnaik at the Raj Bhavan complex. The ceremony was attended by a host of dignitaries including Union DoNER and Mines Minister Bijoy Krishna Handique, Chief Justice of the Gauhati High Court Madan Bhimarao Lokur, Meghalaya Chief Minister Mukul Sangma, Assam Pradesh Congress President Bhubaneswar Kalita, Bodoland People's Front President and BTC Chief Executive Member Hagrama Mohilary, the newly-elected members of the legislative assembly, among prominent.

== Composition ==
Gogoi dropped 8 ministers from his previous ministry including former chief minister Bhumidhar Barman. Gogoi retained Prithibi Majhi, Gautam Roy, Ajanta Neog, Akon Bora, Himanta Biswa Sarma, Khorsing Engti, Nazrul Islam, Pradyut Bordoloi and Rakibul Hussain along with BPF representative Chandan Brahma. On 27 May 2011, the ministers of the council of ministers were inducted in a solemn ceremony. 18 ministers were appointed among whom 13 were of cabinet rank, namely Prithibi Majhi and Tanka Bahadur Rai (former Speakers), Nazrul Islam, Gautam Roy, Ajanta Neog, Ardhendu Kumar Dey, Akon Bora, Himanta Biswa Sarma, Khorsing Engti, Rakibul Hussain, Nilamani Sen Deka, Pradyut Bordoloi, Pranati Phukan and Chandan Brahma, while four appointees were ministers of state with independent charge which included Ajit Singh, Basanta Das, Rajib Lochan Pegu and Siddique Ahmed. All the ministers except for Chandan Brahma were Congress legislators while Brahma belong to the Bodoland People's Front. The portfolios were assigned among the ministers on 30 May 2011 He allocated the portfolios to his ministers on 30 May 2011.

Transport minister Chandan Brahma resigned from the cabinet after the Bodoland People's Front withdrew from the Congress alliance on 27 June 2014. This was followed by resignation of disgruntled Congress minister Himanta Biswa Sarma in July 2014 who later joined the Bharatiya Janata Party and became chief minister in 2021. Senior cabinet minister Ardhendu Kumar Dey and minister of state Siddique Ahmed were dropped from the cabinet on 23 July 2014 for accompanying Sarma to submit this resignation to the cabinet.

On 22 January 2015, all the ministers of the government submitted their resignation to the chief minister to pave way for a reshuffle which took place on 26 January 2015. Among those ministers who were re-appointed were Ajanta Neog, Nazrul Islam, Khorsing Engti and Rakibul Islam, while the newly appointed ministers included former caretaker chief minister Bhumidhar Barman, Sarat Barkotoky, Sukur Ali Ahmed, Chandan Kumar Sarkar and Atuwa Munda. Ajit Singh and Basanta Das were promoted to cabinet rank while Sumitra Patir, Girindra Mallik and Bismita Gogoi were inducted as ministers of state with independent charge.

On 22 September 2015, former ministers Gautam Roy and Siddique Ahmed were appointed as cabinet ministers in the government.

== Council of Ministers ==
Portfolio	Minister	Took office	Left office	Party
Chief Minister and also in-charge of: Department of Home; Department of Political; Department of Personnel; Department of Finance; General Administration Department; Secretariat Administration Department; Department of Election; Department of Passport; Department of Information Technology; Department of Science and Technology, and All other departments not allocated to any other Minister.	Tarun Gogoi	18 May 2011	24 May 2016	INC
Minister of Administrative Reforms and Training	Tarun Gogoi	30 May 2011	26 January 2015	INC
Minister of Administrative Reforms and Training	Bhumidhar Barman	26 January 2015	24 May 2016	INC
Minister of Guwahati Development Department	Tarun Gogoi	30 May 2011	20 June 2012	INC
Minister of Guwahati Development Department	Ajanta Neog	20 June 2012	26 January 2015	INC
Minister of Guwahati Development Department	Tarun Gogoi	26 January 2015	24 May 2016	INC
Minister of Revenue and Disaster Management	Prithibi Majhi	30 May 2011	26 January 2015	INC
Minister of Revenue and Disaster Management	Bhumidhar Barman	26 January 2015	24 May 2016	INC
Minister of Relief and Rehabilitation; Minister of Labour and Employment	Prithibi Majhi	30 May 2011	26 January 2015	INC
Minister of Relief and Rehabilitation; Minister of Labour and Employment	Tarun Gogoi	26 January 2015	24 May 2016	INC
Minister of Tea Tribes Welfare	Prithibi Majhi	30 May 2011	26 January 2015	INC
Minister of Tea Tribes Welfare	Atuwa Munda	26 January 2015	24 May 2016	INC
Minister of Planning and Development; Minister of Judicial, Legislative and Law	Tanka Bahadur Rai	30 May 2011	26 January 2015	INC
Minister of Planning and Development; Minister of Judicial, Legislative and Law	Ajanta Neog	26 January 2015	24 May 2016	INC
Minister of Pension and Public Grievance	Tanka Bahadur Rai	30 May 2011	26 January 2015	INC
Minister of Pension and Public Grievance	Sarat Barkotoky	26 January 2015	24 May 2016	INC
Minister of Food; Minister of Civil Supplies and Consumer Affairs	Nazrul Islam	30 May 2011	24 May 2016	INC
Minister of Welfare of Minorities; Minister of Haj	Nazrul Islam	30 May 2011	26 January 2015	INC
Minister of Welfare of Minorities; Minister of Haj	Sukur Ali Ahmed	26 January 2015	24 May 2016	INC
Minister of Public Health Engineering	Gautam Roy	30 May 2011	26 January 2015	INC
Minister of Public Health Engineering	Sukur Ali Ahmed	26 January 2015	24 May 2016	INC
Minister of Public Works (Roads and Buildings, National Highways)	Ajanta Neog	30 May 2011	24 May 2016	INC
Minister of Urban Development; Minister of Housing	Ajanta Neog	30 May 2011	26 January 2015	INC
Minister of Urban Development; Minister of Housing	Sumitra Patir, MoS (I/C)	26 January 2015	24 May 2016	INC
Minister of Irrigation; Minister of Soil Conservation	Ardhendu Kumar Dey	30 May 2011	23 July 2014	INC
Minister of Irrigation; Minister of Soil Conservation	Nilamani Sen Deka	23 July 2014	26 January 2015	INC
Minister of Irrigation; Minister of Soil Conservation	Chandan Kumar Sarkar	26 January 2015	24 May 2016	INC
Minister of Social Welfare	Akon Bora	30 May 2011	26 January 2015	INC
Minister of Social Welfare	Tarun Gogoi	26 January 2015	22 September 2015	INC
Minister of Social Welfare	Gautam Roy	22 September 2015	24 May 2016	INC
Minister of Jails	Akon Bora	30 May 2011	26 January 2015	INC
Minister of Jails	Girindra Mallik, MoS (I/C)	26 January 2015	24 May 2016	INC
Minister of Transport	Chandan Brahma	30 May 2011	27 June 2014	BPF
Minister of Transport	Tarun Gogoi	27 June 2014	26 January 2015	INC
Minister of Transport	Ajit Singh	26 January 2015	24 May 2016	INC
Minister of Tourism	Chandan Brahma	30 May 2011	27 June 2014	BPF
Minister of Tourism	Tarun Gogoi	27 June 2014	26 January 2015	INC
Minister of Tourism	Sumitra Patir, MoS (I/C)	26 January 2015	24 May 2016	INC
Minister of Health and Family Welfare	Himanta Biswa Sarma	30 May 2011	23 July 2014	INC
Minister of Health and Family Welfare	Nazrul Islam	23 July 2014	24 May 2016	INC
Minister of Education	Himanta Biswa Sarma	30 May 2011	23 July 2014	INC
Minister of Education	Pradyut Bordoloi	23 July 2014	26 January 2015	INC
Minister of Education	Sarat Barkotoky	26 January 2015	24 May 2016	INC
Minister of Implementation of Assam Accord	Himanta Biswa Sarma	30 May 2011	23 July 2014	INC
Minister of Implementation of Assam Accord	Tarun Gogoi	23 July 2014	26 January 2015	INC
Minister of Implementation of Assam Accord	Bhumidhar Barman	26 January 2015	24 May 2016	INC
Minister of Animal Husbandry and Veterinary; Minister of Hill Areas Development	Khorsing Engti	30 May 2011	24 May 2016	INC
Minister of Mines and Minerals	Khorsing Engti	30 May 2011	26 January 2015	INC
Minister of Mines and Minerals	Girindra Mallik, MoS (I/C)	26 January 2015	24 May 2016	INC
Minister of Panchayat and Rural Development	Rakibul Hussain	30 May 2011	24 May 2016	INC
Minister of Agriculture, Horticulture and Food Processing; Minister of Parliamentary Affairs	Nilamani Sen Deka	30 May 2011	26 January 2015	INC
Minister of Agriculture, Horticulture and Food Processing; Minister of Parliamentary Affairs	Rakibul Hussain	26 January 2015	24 May 2016	INC
Minister of Industries and Commerce; Minister of Power; Minister of Public Enterprises	Pradyut Bordoloi	30 May 2011	26 January 2015	INC
Minister of Industries and Commerce; Minister of Power; Minister of Public Enterprises	Tarun Gogoi	26 January 2015	22 September 2015	INC
Minister of Industries and Commerce; Minister of Power; Minister of Public Enterprises	Siddique Ahmed	22 September 2015	24 May 2016	INC
Minister of Handloom, Textiles and Sericulture; Minister of Cultural Affairs	Pranati Phukan	30 May 2011	26 January 2015	INC
Minister of Handloom, Textiles and Sericulture; Minister of Cultural Affairs	Bismita Gogoi, MoS (I/C)	26 January 2015	24 May 2016	INC
Minister of Environment and Forest	Rakibul Hussain	30 May 2011	26 January 2015	INC
Minister of Environment and Forest	Atuwa Munda	26 January 2015	24 May 2016	INC
Minister of Co-operation	Siddique Ahmed, MoS (I/C)	30 May 2011	23 July 2014	INC
Minister of Co-operation	Ajit Singh, MoS (I/C)	23 July 2014	26 January 2015	INC
Minister of Co-operation	Khorsing Engti	26 January 2015	24 May 2016	INC
Minister of Excise; Minister of Sports and Youth Welfare	Ajit Singh, MoS (I/C)	30 May 2011	26 January 2015	INC
Minister of Excise; Minister of Sports and Youth Welfare	Ajit Singh	26 January 2015	24 May 2016	INC
Minister of Fisheries	Basanta Das, MoS (I/C)	30 May 2011	26 January 2015	INC
Minister of Fisheries	Basanta Das	26 January 2015	24 May 2016	INC
Minister of Information and Public Relations; Minister of Printing and Stationery	Basanta Das, MoS (I/C)	30 May 2011	26 January 2015	INC
Minister of Information and Public Relations; Minister of Printing and Stationery	Tarun Gogoi	26 January 2015	24 May 2016	INC
Minister of Water Resources	Rajib Lochan Pegu, MoS (I/C)	30 May 2011	26 January 2015	INC
Minister of Water Resources	Basanta Das	26 January 2015	24 May 2016	INC
Minister of Welfare of Plain Tribes and Backward Classes	Chandan Brahma (only BTAD areas)	30 May 2011	27 June 2014	BPF
Minister of Welfare of Plain Tribes and Backward Classes	Rajib Lochan Pegu, MoS (I/C) (non-BTAD areas)	30 May 2011	26 January 2015	INC
Minister of Scheduled Castes Welfare	Basanta Das	26 January 2015	24 May 2016	INC
Minister of Tribal Welfare	Sumitra Patir, MoS (I/C)	26 January 2015	24 May 2016	INC
Minister of Backward Castes Welfare	Bismita Gogoi, MoS (I/C)	26 January 2015	24 May 2016	INC
Minister of Border Areas Development	Siddique Ahmed, MoS (I/C)	30 May 2011	23 July 2014	INC
Minister of Border Areas Development	Tarun Gogoi	23 July 2014	26 January 2015	INC
Minister of Border Areas Development	Girindra Mallik, MoS (I/C)	26 January 2015	24 May 2016	INC
