= Amguri Assembly constituency =

Constituency of the Assam legislative assembly in India

Coordinates: 26.81°N 94.52°E

Amguri
- Former constituency No. 103 for the Assam Legislative Assembly

Constituency details
- Country: India
- Region: Northeast India
- State: Assam
- District: Sivasagar
- Lok Sabha constituency: Jorhat
- Established: 1951
- Abolished: 2023
- Reservation: None

Amguri Assembly constituency was one of the 126 assembly constituencies in Sivasagar District of Assam a north east state of India. Amguri is also part of Jorhat Lok Sabha constituency.

This constituency was abolished in 2023.

== Members of Legislative Assembly ==
Election	Member	Party affiliation
1952	Rabin Kakoti	Indian National Congress
1957	Khagendranath Borborua	Independent
1962	Khagen Borbarua	Revolutionary Communist Party of India
1967	Puspadhar Chaliha	Indian National Congress
1972	Puspadhar Chaliha	Indian National Congress
1978	Khagen Borbarua	Revolutionary Communist Party of India
1983	Kirti Dutta	Indian National Congress
1985	Prodip Hazarika	Independent
1991	Anjan Dutta	Indian National Congress
1996	Prodip Hazarika	Asom Gana Parishad
2001	Anjan Dutta	Indian National Congress
2006	Prodip Hazarika	Asom Gana Parishad
2011	Anjan Dutta	Indian National Congress
2016	Prodip Hazarika	Asom Gana Parishad
2021	Prodip Hazarika	Asom Gana Parishad

== Election results ==
=== 2021 ===
2021 Assam Legislative Assembly election: Amguri
Party	Candidate	Votes	%	±%
AGP	Prodip Hazarika	49,891	48.03	+4.28
INC	Angkita Dutta	43,712	42.08	+0.02
AJP	Chandra Boruah	6,987	6.73	N/A
Independent	Pradip Hazarika	1,022	0.98	N/A
Independent	Rajkumar Duwara	959	0.92	N/A
NOTA	None of the above	1,313	1.26	−0.19
Majority		6,179	5.95	+4.26
Turnout		1,03,884	83.18	−2.76
Registered electors		1,24,891		
AGP hold		Swing		

=== 2016 ===
2016 Assam Legislative Assembly election: Amguri
Party	Candidate	Votes	%	±%
AGP	Prodip Hazarika	42,010	43.75	−3.45
INC	Angkita Dutta	40,390	42.06	−5.48
Independent	Dulal Baruah	5,498	5.72	N/A
Independent	Janardan Hazarika	3,420	3.56	N/A
Independent	Dilram Karmakar	1,053	1.09	N/A
AIUDF	Gayatri Borah Kalita	873	0.90	+0.24
AIFB	Rajkumar Dowarah	699	0.72	−0.97
Independent	Anwar Hussain	672	0.69	N/A
NOTA	None of the above	1,399	1.45	N/A
Majority		1,620	1.69	+1.35
Turnout		96,014	85.94	+9.26
Registered electors		1,11,717		
AGP gain from INC		Swing		

=== 2011 ===
2011 Assam Legislative Assembly election: Amguri
Party	Candidate	Votes	%	±%
INC	Anjan Dutta	39,549	47.54	+2.59
AGP	Prodip Hazarika	39,263	47.20	−3.16
BJP	Anup Gogoi	1,823	2.19	+0.37
AIFB	Rajkumar Dowarah	1,405	1.69	N/A
AITC	Manik Dutta	598	0.72	N/A
AIUDF	Jayanta Gogoi	553	0.66	N/A
Majority		286	0.34	−5.07
Turnout		83,191	76.68	−5.50
Registered electors		1,08,497		
INC gain from AGP		Swing		

=== 2006 ===
Assam Legislative Assembly election, 2006: Amguri
Party	Candidate	Votes	%	±%
AGP	Prodip Hazarika	44,497	50.36	
INC	Anjan Dutta	39,719	44.95	
BJP	Bidya Nanda Phukan	1,608	1.82	
Independent	On Luktai	1,255	1.42	
RCPI(R)	Rajkumar Dowarah	853	0.97	
AGP(P)	Manik Mahanta	422	0.48	
Majority		4,778	5.41	
Turnout		88,354	82.18	
Registered electors		1,07,511		
AGP gain from INC		Swing		

== See also ==
- Amguri
- List of constituencies of Assam Legislative Assembly
