= Margherita Assembly constituency =

Constituency of the Assam legislative assembly in India

Margherita
- Constituency No. 83 for the Assam Legislative Assembly

Constituency details
- Country: India
- Region: Northeast India
- State: Assam
- District: Tinsukia
- Lok Sabha constituency: Dibrugarh
- Established: 1978
- Reservation: None
- Elected year: 2021

Margherita Assembly constituency is one of the 126 assembly constituencies of Assam, a north east state of India. Margherita is part of Dibrugarh Lok Sabha constituency.

== Members of Legislative Assembly ==
Election	Member	Party affiliation
1978	Kul Bahadur Chetri	Janata Party
1983	Kul Bahadur Chetri	Indian National Congress
1985	Kul Bahadur Chetri	Indian National Congress
1991	Kul Bahadur Chetri	Indian National Congress
1996	Tarun Gogoi	Indian National Congress
1998^	Pradyut Bordoloi	Indian National Congress
2001	Pradyut Bordoloi	Indian National Congress
2006	Pradyut Bordoloi	Indian National Congress
2011	Pradyut Bordoloi	Indian National Congress
2016	Bhaskar Sharma	Bharatiya Janata Party
2021	Bhaskar Sharma	Bharatiya Janata Party
2026	Bhaskar Sharma	

== Election results ==
=== 2026 ===
2026 Assam Legislative Assembly election: Margherita
Party	Candidate	Votes	%	±%
BJP	Bhaskar Sharma	86349	61.72	
RD	Rahul Chetry	31032	22.18	
None of the Above	NOTA	3290	2.35	
Margin of victory		55317		
Turnout		139899		
Rejected ballots				
Registered electors				
BJP hold		Swing		

=== 2021 ===
2021 Assam Legislative Assembly election: Margherita
Party	Candidate	Votes	%	±%
BJP	Bhaskar Sharma	86,640	56.52	+0.68
INC	Manoranjan Borgohain	28,140	18.36	−20.85
AJP	Sanjay Kumar Deb	22,935	14.96	N/A
Independent	Ignatius Ekka	10,315	6.73	N/A
Independent	Rantu Sonowal	1,444	0.94	N/A
Independent	Bhogeswar Shyam	1,269	0.83	N/A
NOTA	None of the above	2,536	1.65	+0.09
Majority		58,500	38.16	+21.53
Turnout		1,53,279	78.12	−5.88
BJP hold		Swing		

=== 2016 ===
2016 Assam Legislative Assembly election: Margherita
Party	Candidate	Votes	%	±%
BJP	Bhaskar Sharma	76,365	55.84	+18.73
INC	Pradyut Bordoloi	53,621	39.21	−12.94
Independent	Nidan Purty	1,332	0.97	N/A
Independent	Bishwanath Singha	1,306	0.95	N/A
Independent	Umesh Bora	1,289	0.74	N/A
Independent	Purna Chhetri	690	0.50	N/A
NOTA	None of the above	2,137	1.56	N/A
Majority		22,744	16.63	+1.59
Turnout		1,36,740	84.00	+15.61
BJP gain from INC		Swing		

=== 2011 ===
2011 Assam Legislative Assembly election: Margherita
Party	Candidate	Votes	%	±%
INC	Pradyut Bordoloi	57,615	52.15	
BJP	Kamakhya Prasad Tasa	41,006	37.11	
AGP	Suren Phukan	7,066	6.40	
Independent	Joikrishna Tanti	2,923	2.65	
AITC	Abani Mohan Medhi	1,874	1.70	
Majority		16,609	15.04	
Turnout		1,10,484	68.39	
INC hold		Swing		

== See also ==
- Margherita
- Tinsukia district
- List of constituencies of Assam Legislative Assembly
