= Bhaskar Sharma =

Indian politician

Member of the Assam Legislative Assembly for Margherita
- Incumbent
- Assumed office 2016
- Preceded by: Pradyut Bordoloi

Personal details
- Born: 20 January 1969 (age 57) Margherita
- Party: Bharatiya Janata Party
- Profession: Business / Politician

Bhaskar Sharma is a Bharatiya Janata Party politician from Assam, India. He has been elected in Assam Legislative Assembly election in 2016 from Margherita constituency.
