= Pradyut Bordoloi =

Indian politician

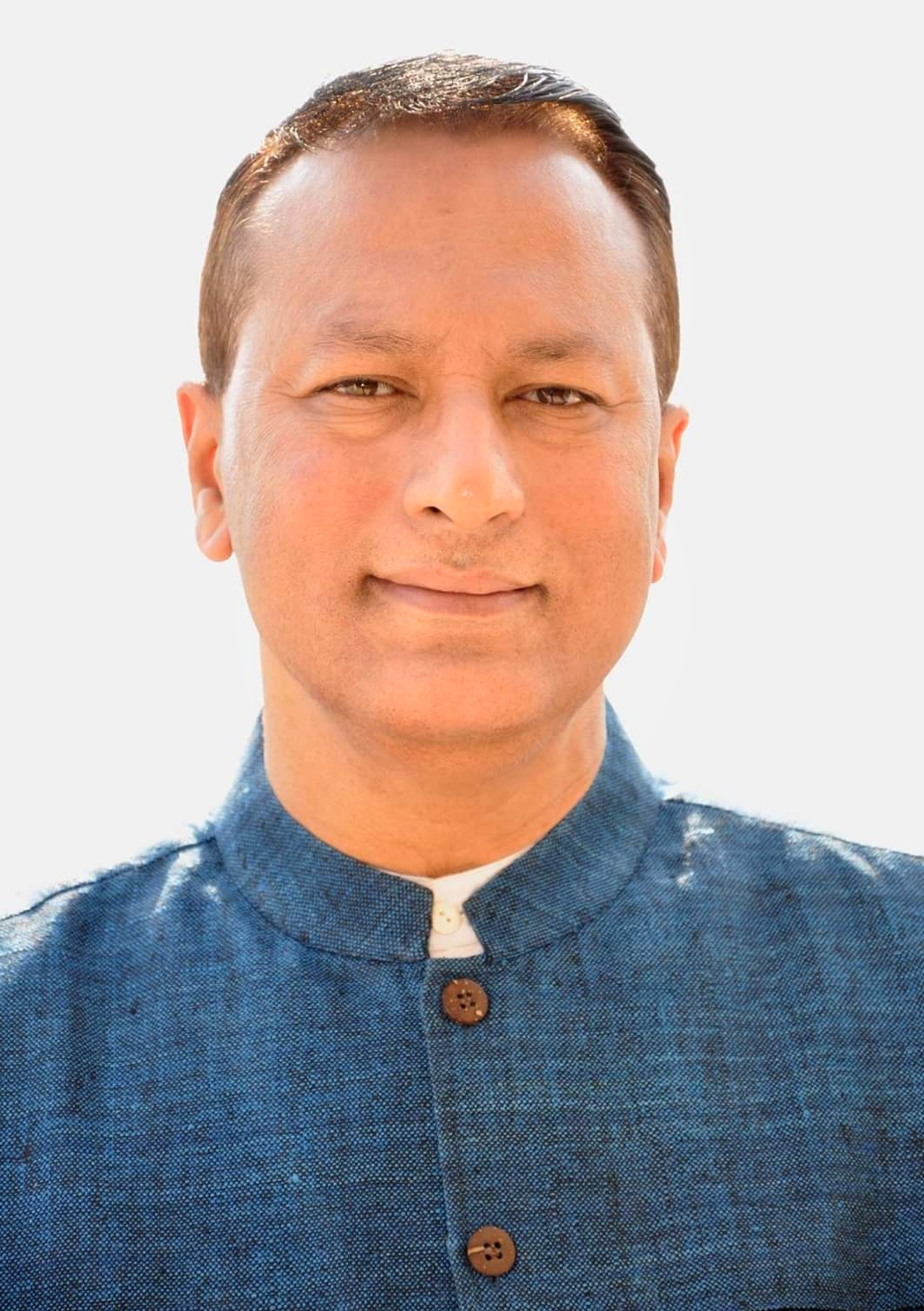

Member of the Assam Legislative Assembly
- Incumbent
- Assumed office 4 May 2026
- Preceded by: Atul Bora
- Constituency: Dispur

Member of Parliament, Lok Sabha
- In office 23 May 2019 – 18 March 2026
- Preceded by: Rajen Gohain
- Succeeded by: Devasish Sharma
- Constituency: Nagaon

Cabinet Minister, Government of Assam
- In office 21 May 2006 – 25 January 2015
- Chief Minister: Tarun Gogoi
- Departments: Industries and Commerce; Power; Public Enterprises; Education (2014–15)
- Preceded by: Anjan Dutta (Industries, Public Enterprises); Tarun Gogoi (Power); Himanta Biswa Sarma (Education)
- Succeeded by: Tarun Gogoi (Industries, Power, Public Enterprises); Sarat Barkotoky (Education)

Minister of State (Independent Charge), Government of Assam
- In office 7 June 2002 – 21 May 2006
- Chief Minister: Tarun Gogoi
- Departments: Environment and Forest; Sports and Youth Welfare (2004–06)
- Preceded by: Gobinda Chandra Langthasa (Environment); Robin Bordoloi (Sports)
- Succeeded by: Rakibul Hussain (Environment); Gautam Bora (Sports)

Minister of State, Government of Assam
- In office 17 May 2001 – 7 June 2002
- Chief Minister: Tarun Gogoi
- Departments: Finance; Industries and Commerce; Information and Public Relations; Science and Technology; Environment and Forest

Member of Assam Legislative Assembly
- In office 1998–2016
- Preceded by: Tarun Gogoi
- Succeeded by: Bhaskar Sharma
- Constituency: Margherita

Personal details
- Born: 28 April 1959 (age 67) Margherita, Assam
- Party: Bharatiya Janata Party (2026–present)
- Other political affiliations: Indian National Congress (1998–2026)
- Children: Two Sons
- Education: Cotton College, Gauhati University (B.A, M.A); Jawaharlal Nehru University (MPhil)
- Occupation: Politician

Pradyut Bordoloi (born 28 April 1959) is a Bharatiya Janata Party politician from Assam serving as the MLA for Dispur in the Assam Legislative Assembly since 2026. He was formerly a member of the Indian National Congress. As a Congress member, he was a four-term MLA for Margherita from 1998 to 2016, and a minister in the Government of Assam from 2001 to 2015. He was also the Member of Parliament for Nagaon Lok Sabha constituency from 2019 to 2026.

== Early life ==
Bordoloi was born on 28 March 1959 in Margherita, Assam. He graduated from Cotton College, Gauhati University with a MA, and from Jawaharlal Nehru University with an MPhil. He was the President of the Assam unit of the National Students’ Union of India.

== Political career ==
Bordoloi was elected to the Assam Legislative Assembly from Margherita in a by-poll in 1998, and was re-elected in 2001, 2006, and 2011. He was a minister of state in the first Tarun Gogoi-led Indian National Congress government from 2001 to 2006. He held portfolios of Industries, Commerce, Power, and Public Enterprises as a senior cabinet minister in the second and third Tarun Gogoi-led Congress ministries from 2006 to 2015. He stepped down as a minister in the 2015 cabinet reshuffle, and was subsequently appointed senior government spokesperson and advisor to the Chief Minister. In 2019, Bordoloi was elected to the Lok Sabha from Nagaon. He was re-elected from Nagaon in 2024. Bordoloi joined the Bharatiya Janata Party on 18 March 2026. He was elected from the Dispur constituency in the 2026 legislative assembly election.
