= Ripun Bora =

Indian politician

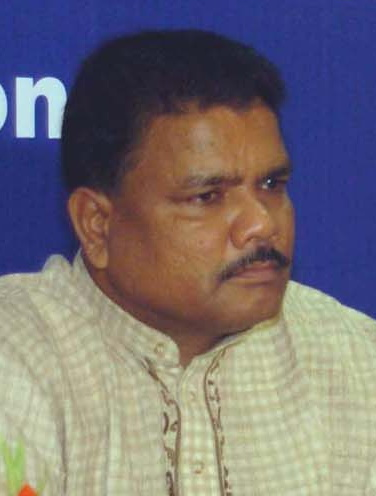
- Official Portrait, 2022

Member of Parliament, Rajya Sabha
- In office 3 April 2016 – 2 April 2022
- Preceded by: Pankaj Bora
- Succeeded by: Rwngwra Narzary
- Constituency: Assam

President, Assam Pradesh Congress Committee
- In office 24 August 2016 – 24 July 2021
- National President: Sonia Gandhi; Rahul Gandhi
- Preceded by: Anjan Dutta
- Succeeded by: Bhupen Kumar Borah

Cabinet Minister, Assam
- In office 21 May 2006 – 3 June 2008
- Chief Minister: Tarun Gogoi
- Department: Education
- Succeeded by: Bhumidhar Barman (Higher Education); Gautam Bora (Elementary Education); Ajanta Neog (Technical Education)

Minister of State (Independent Charge), Assam
- In office 7 June 2002 – 21 May 2006
- Chief Minister: Tarun Gogoi
- Departments: Panchayat and Rural Development; Elementary Education (2004–2006)
- Preceded by: Bhumidhar Barman (P&RD); Pankaj Bora (Education)
- Succeeded by: Chandan Brahma (P&RD); Self (Education)

Member, Assam Legislative Assembly
- In office 14 May 2001 – 14 May 2011
- Preceded by: Ganesh Kutum
- Succeeded by: Monika Bora
- Constituency: Gohpur

Personal details
- Born: 1 October 1955 (age 70)
- Party: Indian National Congress (Before 2022, 2024 - present)
- Other political affiliations: Trinamool Congress (2022–2024)
- Education: Gauhati University (1978)

Ripun Bora (born 1 October 1955) is an Indian politician from Assam and member of the Indian National Congress. He was the President of the Assam Pradesh Congress Committee from 2016 to 2021. He was the President of the Assam Trinamool Congress from 2022 to 2024. Bora was a Member of Parliament in the Rajya Sabha for Assam from 2016 to 2022, and he served as the MLA of Gohpur in the Assam Legislative Assembly from 2001 to 2011. Bora was a cabinet minister in the Assam Government under Chief Minister, Tarun Gogoi.

== Biography ==
Bora is a graduate of Gauhati University. He was elected to the Assam Legislative Assembly from Gohpur in 2001, and re-elected in 2006. He was a minister of state in the first Tarun Gogoi-led Indian National Congress government in Assam, and a cabinet minister in the second Gogoi ministry. He was elected to the Rajya Sabha in 2016, and represented Assam until 2022. Bora was elected president of the Assam Pradesh Congress Committee in 2016, and resigned following the party's defeat in the 2021 elections. He resigned from the Indian National Congress in 2022, and was elected president of the Assam Trinamool Congress. He joined the Indian National Congress again in 2024.

On 3 June, 2008, Bora was arrested in Delhi for allegedly offering a bribe of Rs 10 lakhs to a CBI official, who was investigating the unresolved killing of Daniel Topno in September 2000. In 2012, he was acquitted of the bribery charge, and in 2014, the Kamrup Metro Session Court discharged him from the case completely.
