= Girindra Mallik =

Indian politician

Minister of State (Independent Charge) for Border Areas, Jails, Mines and Minerals, Government of Assam
- In office 26 January 2015 – 24 May 2016
- Chief Minister: Tarun Gogoi
- Preceded by: Tarun Gogoi (Border Areas); Akon Bora (Jails); Khorsing Engti (Mines and Minerals)
- Succeeded by: Sarbananda Sonowal (Border Areas, Jails); Pramila Rani Brahma (Mines and Minerals)

Member of Assam Legislative Assembly for Dholai
- In office 1996–2001
- Preceded by: Parimal Suklabaidya
- Succeeded by: Parimal Suklabaidya
- In office 13 May 2011 – 19 May 2016
- Preceded by: Parimal Suklabaidya
- Succeeded by: Parimal Suklabaidya

Personal details
- Born: 1 May 1939 (age 86)
- Political party: Indian National Congress
- Spouse: Nillima Mallik (m. 1963)
- Parent(s): Sukhlal Mallik (father); Saudamini Mallik (mother)

Girindra Mallik (born 1 May 1939) is a former member of the Assam Legislative Assembly and represented the Dholai constituency on two separate occasions. He was first elected to the legislative assembly in 1996 defeating Parimal Suklabaidya but was defeated in the 2001 Assam Legislative election by Suklaibaidya. He was re-elected from the same constituency for a second term in 2011, defeating Suklabaidya.

He was inducted into the council of ministers of Chief Minister Tarun Gogoi as the Minister of State (Independent Charge) for Border Areas, Jails, and Mines and Minerals in January 2015. He contested the 2016 elections from the same constituency but was defeated by Parimal Suklabaidya.
