= Dharmapur Assembly constituency =

Assembly constituency of Assam

Coordinates: 26.33°N 90.15°E

Dharmapur
- Former constituency No. 61 for the Assam Legislative Assembly

Constituency details
- Country: India
- Region: Northeast India
- State: Assam
- Division: Lower Assam
- District: Nalbari
- Lok Sabha constituency: Barpeta
- Established: 1967
- Abolished: 2023
- Reservation: None

Dharmapur Assembly constituency was one of the 126 assembly constituencies of Assam Legislative Assembly. Dharmapur formed part of the Barpeta Lok Sabha constituency.

This constituency was abolished in 2023.

== Dharmapur Assembly constituency Details ==
Following are details on Dharmapur Assembly constituency-

- Country: India.
- State: Assam.
- District: Nalbari district .
- Lok Sabha Constituency: Barpeta Lok Sabha/Parliamentary constituency.
- Assembly Categorisation: Rural constituency.
- Literacy Level:79.89%.
- Eligible Electors as per 2021 General Elections: 1,41,592 Eligible Electors. Male Electors:73,559. Female Electors:68,033 .
- Geographic Co-Ordinates: 26°25'25.7"N 91°20'45.2"E.
- Total Area Covered: 236 square kilometres.
- Area Includes:Dharmapur, Khetri Dharmapur, Pakowa and Natun Dehar mouzas in Nalbari thana in Nalbari subdivision, of Nalbari district of Assam.
- Inter State Border :Nalbari.
- Number Of Polling Stations: Year 2011-184, Year 2016-184, Year 2021-61.

== Members of Legislative Assembly ==
Following is the list of past members representing Dharmapur Assembly constituency in Assam Legislature-

- 1967: K. Hazarika, Communist Party of India.
- 1972: Surendra Nath Das, Indian National Congress.
- 1978: Ramani Barman, Janata Party.
- 1983: Bhumidhar Barman, Indian National Congress.
- 1985: Chandra Mohan Patowary, Independent.
- 1991: Chandra Mohan Patowary, Independent.
- 1996: Chandra Mohan Patowary, Asom Gana Parishad.
- 2001: Nilamani Sen Deka, Indian National Congress.
- 2006: Chandra Mohan Patowary, Asom Gana Parishad.
- 2011: Nilamani Sen Deka, Indian National Congress.
- 2016: Chandra Mohan Patowary, Bharatiya Janata Party.

Election	Name	Party
2021	Chandra Mohan Patowary	Bharatiya Janata Party

== Election results ==
=== 2016 ===
2016 Assam Legislative Assembly election: Dharmapur
Party	Candidate	Votes	%	±%
BJP	Chandra Mohan Patowary	70,503	63.54	
INC	Nilamani Sen Deka	36,560	32.95	
Independent	Dipak Barman	2,194	1.97	
RJP	Sankar Talukdar	699	0.63	
NOTA	None of the above	988	0.89	
Majority		33,943	30.59	
Turnout		1,10,944	85.38	
Registered electors		1,29,940		
BJP gain from INC		Swing		

== See also ==
- Golaghat district
- Dergaon
- List of constituencies of Assam Legislative Assembly
