= Prodip Hazarika =

Indian politician

Member of the Assam Legislative Assembly for Amguri
- Incumbent
- Assumed office 2016
- Preceded by: Anjan Dutta

Personal details
- Party: Independent politician

Prodip Hazarika is an Asom Gana Parishad politician from Assam, India. He has been elected to the Assam Legislative Assembly in the 1985, 1996, 2006 and 2016 elections from Amguri constituency.
