= Chandan Brahma =

Indian politician

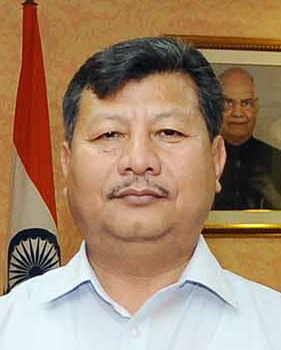
- Chandan Brahma in 2018

Cabinet Minister, Assam
- In office 26 April 2018 – 10 May 2021
- Chief Minister: Sarbananda Sonowal
- Departments: Tourism; Welfare of Plain Tribes and Backward Classes
- Preceded by: Himanta Biswa Sarma (Tourism); Pramila Rani Brahma (WPT&BC)
- Succeeded by: Bimal Bora (Tourism); Urkhao Gwra Brahma and Ranoj Pegu (WPT&BC)
- In office 18 May 2011 – 27 June 2014
- Chief Minister: Tarun Gogoi
- Departments: Transport; Tourism; Welfare of Plain Tribes and Backward Classes (only BTAD)
- Preceded by: Self (Transport); Rakibul Hussain (Tourism); Pramila Rani Brahma (WPT&BC)
- Succeeded by: Tarun Gogoi (Transport, Tourism)
- In office 21 May 2006 – 18 May 2011
- Chief Minister: Tarun Gogoi
- Departments: Transport; Panchayat and Rural Development
- Preceded by: Anjan Dutta (Transport); Bhumidhar Barman (P&RD)
- Succeeded by: Rakibul Hussain

Member, Assam Legislative Assembly
- In office 2006–2021
- Preceded by: Matindra Basumatary
- Succeeded by: Joyanta Basumatary
- Constituency: Sidli (ST)

Chandan Brahma is a politician from Assam belonging to the Bodoland People's Front. He represented the Sidli Assembly constituency of Kokrajhar district in Assam Legislative Assembly from 2006 until 2021. He was first elected to the Assam Legislative Assembly in 2006 as an independent candidate and later joined the Bodoland People's Front.

He was appointed a cabinet minister in the Government of Assam under chief minister Tarun Gogoi in 2006 and assigned the portfolios of Panchayat and Rural Development and Transport. He was re-appointed to the cabinet in 2011 and assigned the portfolios of Transport, Tourism, and Welfare of Plain Tribes and Backward Classes (only BTAD areas). Following the Bodoland People's Front's decision to withdraw from the United Progressive Alliance in the aftermath of the 2014 general election, Brahma tendered his resignation from the council of ministers on 29 June 2014.

The Bodoland People's Front contested the 2016 state assembly election as a part of the National Democratic Alliance and upon the victory of the NDA, two of the party's legislators– Pramila Rani Brahma and Rihon Daimary were appointed ministers in the cabinet of Sarbananda Sonowal. In a cabinet reshuffle on 26 April 2018, Brahma was inducted into the council of ministers and assigned the portfolios of Tourism and Welfare of Plain Tribes and Backward Classes.
