= Anjan Dutta (politician) =

Indian politician

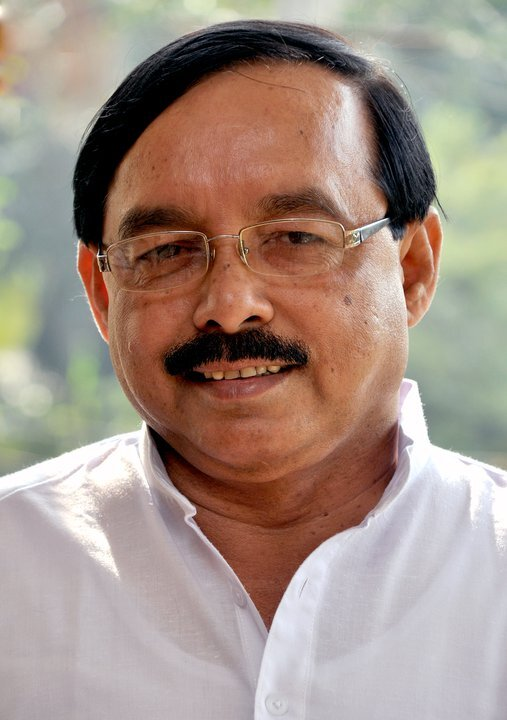
- Anjan Dutta

President, Assam Pradesh Congress Committee
- In office 13 December 2014 – 16 June 2016
- Appointed by: Sonia Gandhi
- Preceded by: Bhubaneswar Kalita
- Succeeded by: Ripun Bora

Cabinet Minister, Assam
- In office 7 June 2002 – 21 May 2006
- Chief Minister: Tarun Gogoi
- Departments: Transport; Guwahati Development; Industries and Commerce, Public Enterprises (2004–06)
- Preceded by: Self (Transport, GDD); Bhubaneswar Kalita (Industries, Public Enterprises)
- Succeeded by: Chandan Brahma (Transport); Himanta Biswa Sarma (GDD); Pradyut Bordoloi (Industries, Public Enterprises)

Minister of State (Independent Charge), Assam
- In office 17 May 2001 – 7 June 2002
- Chief Minister: Tarun Gogoi
- Departments: Transport; Guwahati Development; Municipal Administration
- In office November 1992 – 22 April 1996
- Chief Minister: Hiteswar Saikia
- Departments: Town and Country Planning; Public Enterprises; Irrigation; Hydro-Carbons Development

Member, Assam Legislative Assembly for Amguri
- In office 2011–2016
- Preceded by: Prodip Hazarika
- Succeeded by: Prodip Hazarika
- In office 2001–2006
- Preceded by: Prodip Hazarika
- Succeeded by: Prodip Hazarika
- In office 1991–1996
- Preceded by: Prodip Hazarika
- Succeeded by: Prodip Hazarika

Personal details
- Born: 13 April 1952 Sibsagar, Assam
- Died: 16 June 2016 (aged 64) AIIMS, Delhi
- Spouse: Ananya Dutta
- Children: 3, Angkita, Amrita, Arpita
- Parents: Thaneswar Dutta; Anjali Dutta
- Website: anjandutta.net

Anjan Dutta (13 April 1952 – 16 June 2016) was an Indian politician from Assam who was President of the Assam Pradesh Congress Committee, and served as Minister of Transport, Industries & Public Enterprises.

He was also the editor of Mahekiya Anubhuti, an Assamese monthly magazine. He served as MLA from the Amguri Constituency three times. He was the Vice President of Assam Olympic Association, President of Sivasagar District Sports Association and also an Executive member of the governing body of Assam Cricket Association. Earlier, Dutta headed the Chair of the President of Assam Pradesh Youth Congress Committee and also served as the Chairman of North East Youth Congress Co-ordination Committee.

== About ==
Dutta ( অঞ্জন দত্ত ) was born on 13 April 1952 in the Sibsagar district of Assam. He belonged to a family who has deep rooted relations with the Congress Party. His father sided with Lt. Indira Gandhi during the Congress party split in the year 1978 and contested as Congress candidate from Sivasagar LAC in the same year. As a minister of Transport, Sjt. Dutta revived the almost dying Assam State Transport Department and has received great accolades far and wide for doing so.

Also as an Industry Minister, he brought life and vigour in the Assam Tea Corporation and set benchmarks for his colleagues and other promising ministers. Dutta enjoyed marital bliss by marrying Ananya Dutta on 5 May 1986. The couple is blessed with three daughters. He died on 16 June 2016 at AIIMS New Delhi at the age of 64.

== Political career ==
Sri. Anjan Dutta actively participated in the Congress organisational matters since 1978 and remained as one of the founder Youth Congress members in Assam. After holding various organizational posts at the grassroots level during difficult and adverse times like the Assam Agitation over foreigners issue during the period 1979–1985. Pleased about the organizational abilities of Sri Dutta, Late Rajiv Gandhi personally instructed the then IYC President Sri Ramesh Chennithala to appoint Sri Dutta as the President of Assam Pradesh Youth Congress in the year 1989. As the PYC President Sri Dutta diligently performed the assigned responsibilities during the crucial period when ULFA was targeting and killing Congressmen. He was largely successful in mobilizing the youth to shun the path of hatred and violence and could also secure the Congress nomination to a record number of 19 Youth Congress members during the 1991 Assembly elections. The party regained power in 1991 elections and Sri. Dutta who contested and won from Amguri LAC, the traditional anti Congress stronghold was made a Minister in the year 1992 in the Hiteswar Saikia led Government. He joined the Council of Ministers in Nov. 1992 till May 1996 and the portfolio held was that of Minister of State (Ind) Town and Country Planning Public Enterprises, Irrigation & Hydro-Carbon Development, Assam. He served as the chairman of the Employment Review Committee of Assam Legislative Agency in that year. Dutta also served as a member of the Assam Agricultural University.

The party lost power in the 1996 election. Thereafter in the same year Sri. Tarun Gogoi was anointed as the President of Assam PCC and Sri. Dutta was appointed PCC General Secretary. He was elected as AICC member in the 1998 Organizational Elections and till his death continued to hold his position intact. During his stint in the Assam PCC, he was responsible for the prestigious districts of Nagaon, Darrang and Dhubri and was largely successful in re-establishing the support base of the party, thus ensuring good performance by the party candidates in the 1998-1999 Parliamentary elections.

Congress again wrested power from the AGP led alliance in the 2001 elections. Again, in 2001, he was elected MLA from 103, Amguri LAC for the second term. In the second term he was initially made the Minister of State holding Independent Charge of the departments of Transport, Municipal Corporation and Guwahati Development. On account of his administrative acumen he was elevated as a Cabinet Minister in 2002. During the period of 2001–03, he devoted his time to reviving the prestigious Assam State Transport Corporation (ASTC) which was dying and was on the verge of closure. Today, the revival of ASTC is a household story that needs no introduction and has remained one of the most visible election slogans in 2006 elections. All fronts of the Transport Department viz. ASTC, Inland Water Transport (IWT) and State Transport Authority (STA) were streamlined and revitalized and record breaking revenue realized compared to all other governments. The success of ASTC and Transport Department was so fructifying that it received national attention and the front-lining States of West Bengal, Bihar, Orissa, Andhra Pradesh, Karnataka and Rajasthan sent official teams to study the success story. As an example, the city of Bangalore introduced Low Floor City Buses after it was introduced in Guwahati city.

After downsizing of the State Ministry in the year 2004 he was retained as a Minister and was allocated the additional charge of Industry & Commerce. This department was too full of challenges as the process of industrialization was very slack and many PSU's were on the verge of closure. Another prestigious PSU - Assam Tea Corporation was in the red and it was only after Sri Dutta took charge as its Chairman in February 2005 that the fortunes were gradually revived. Today employees of ATC are receiving regular salaries as its production capacity was enhanced and its produce received good prices from the market. Sri Dutta as the Minister for Industries could also revive the dying Assam Small Industries Development Corporation (ASIDC) due to effective regulation of the Assam Store Purchase Control Act (APSP). He was also largely successful in taking the Industries and Commerce Department to the doorstep of the average entrepreneur by launching the innovative schemes of KarmaJyoti (beneficiary scheme for the weavers and artisans) and Chatra UdyogJyoti (motivational scheme for entrepreneurship).

He headed the Amguri constituency from 1991–96, from 2001-2006 and again in 2011 till 2016. On 13 December 2014, he took charge as the President of Assam Pradesh Congress and remained in this post till his demise.
