= Khorsing Engti =

Indian politician (born 1948)

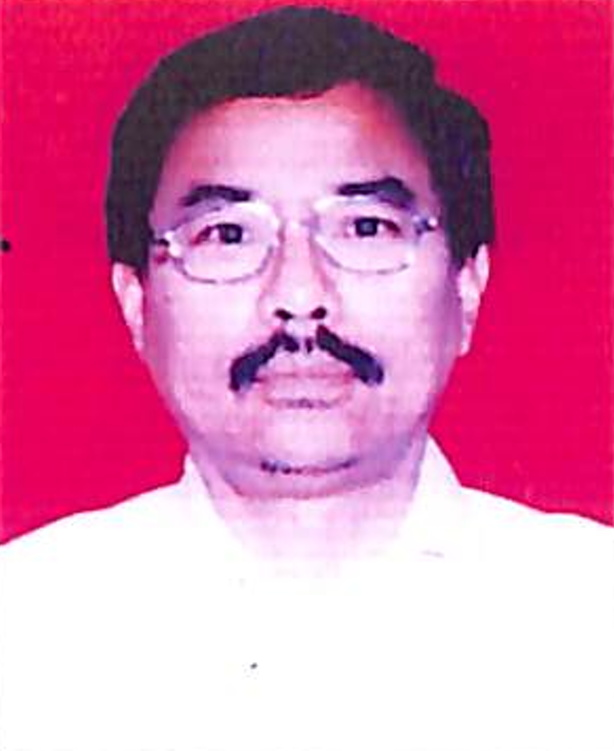

Cabinet Minister, Assam
- In office 21 May 2006 – 24 May 2016
- Chief Minister: Tarun Gogoi
- Departments: Hill Areas Development; Animal Husbandry and Veterinary; Mines and Minerals (2006–15)
- Preceded by: Gobinda Chandra Langthasa
- Succeeded by: Sarbananda Sonowal (HAD); Atul Bora (AH&V); Girindra Mallik (Mines)

Member, Assam Legislative Assembly
- In office 11 May 2006 – 19 May 2016
- Preceded by: Dharamsing Teron
- Succeeded by: Joyram Engleng
- In office 1985–1991
- Preceded by: Dorsing Terang
- Succeeded by: Babu Rongpi
- Constituency: Howraghat

Personal details
- Born: December 1948 (age 77) Pan Engti gaon, Howraghat, Karbi Anglong
- Party: Indian National Congress
- Spouse: Permola Beypi
- Children: 6
- Parents: Pan Engti; Banreh Tokbipi
- Occupation: Politician

Khorsing Engti (born December 1948) is an Indian politician from the state of Assam. He is a former Member of Assam Legislative Assembly for Howraghat (having won in the 1985, 2006 and 2011 elections) and a minister in the Tarun Gogoi cabinet.
