= 2006 Assam Legislative Assembly election =

Indian state election

- 4 and 11 April 2006

All 126 seats in the Assam Legislative Assembly 64 seats needed for a majority
- Turnout: 75.77%
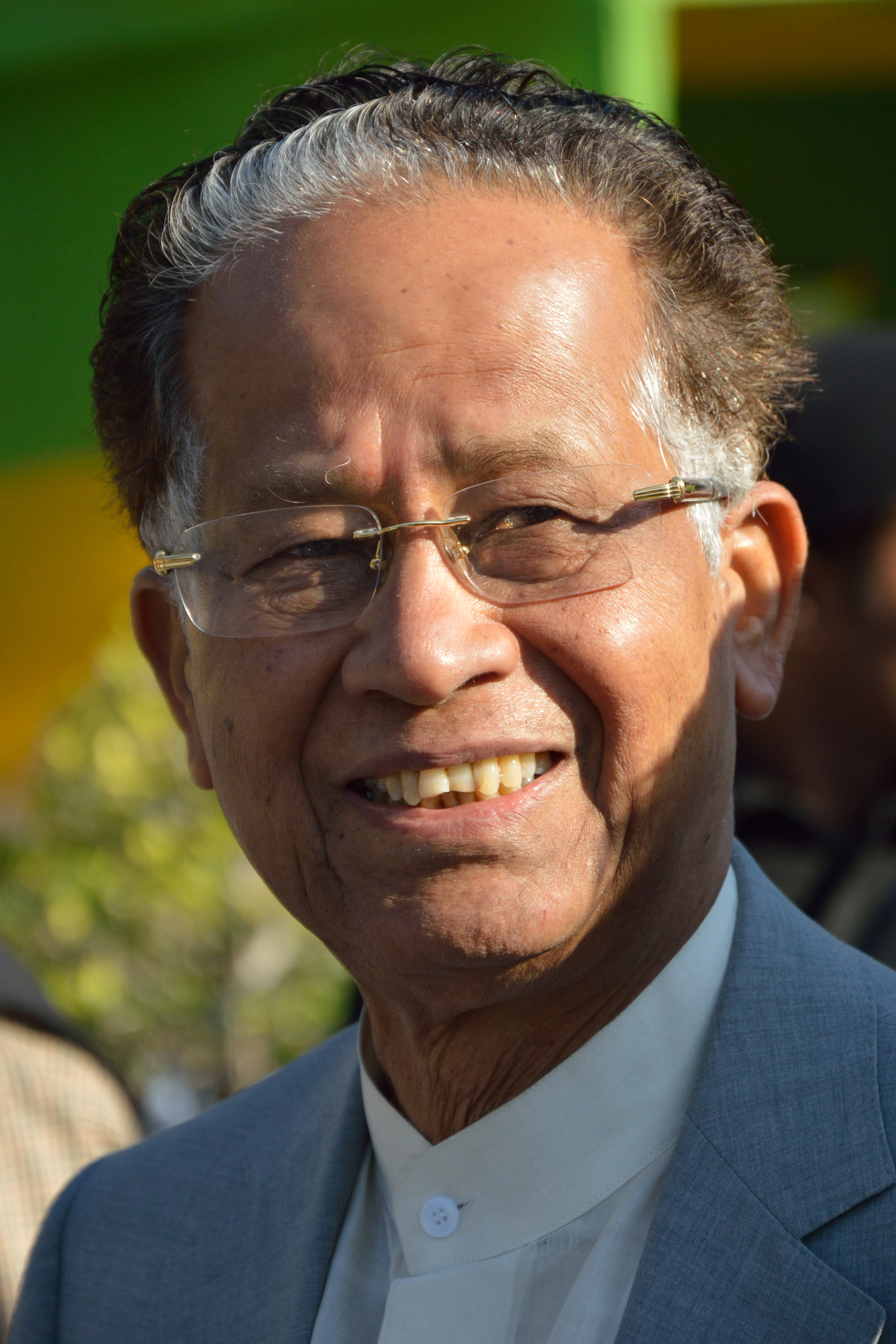

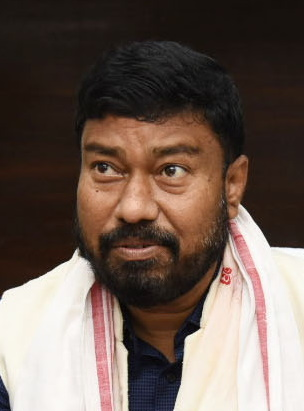

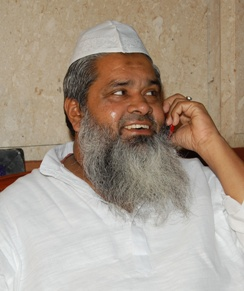
	Majority party	Minority party
		AGP
Leader	Tarun Gogoi	Brindaban Goswami
Party	INC	AGP
Alliance	UPA
Last election	71	20
Seats won	53 (INC); 11 (BPF)	24
Seat change	▼7	▲4
Percentage	31.06% (INC); 3.08% (BPF)	20.39%
	Third party	Fourth party
Leader	Rameswar Teli	Badruddin Ajmal
Party	BJP	AIUDF
Last election	8	New
Seats won	10	10
Seat change	▲2	New
Percentage	11.98%	9.03%
Chief Minister before election
Tarun Gogoi
INC
Chief Minister
Tarun Gogoi
INC

Legislative Assembly elections were held in Assam in two phases between 3 and 10 April 2006 to elect members from all 126 constituencies of the state . Following the election, the incumbent Chief Minister Tarun Gogoi formed his second ministry with the support of the Bodoland People's Front.

== Background ==
After the 2001 elections, the Indian National Congress formed the government. In 2002, the Bodo Liberation Tigers Force and the Assam Government headed by Chief Minister, Tarun Gogoi, signed a memorandum for a peace agreement. The Bodoland Territorial Council was established in 2003 under the Sixth Schedule to the Constitution of India. In 2005, the Bollywood Hindi-language war film, Tango Charlie, was banned in Assam for allegedly defaming the Bodo people. Tribal Affairs minister, Bharat Narah, warned that a film defaming the people of Assam would not be allowed screening. Before the elections, the Indian National Congress and the Bodoland People's Front formed an electoral alliance against the opposition parties, the Asom Gana Parishad and the Bharatiya Janata Party.

== Schedule ==
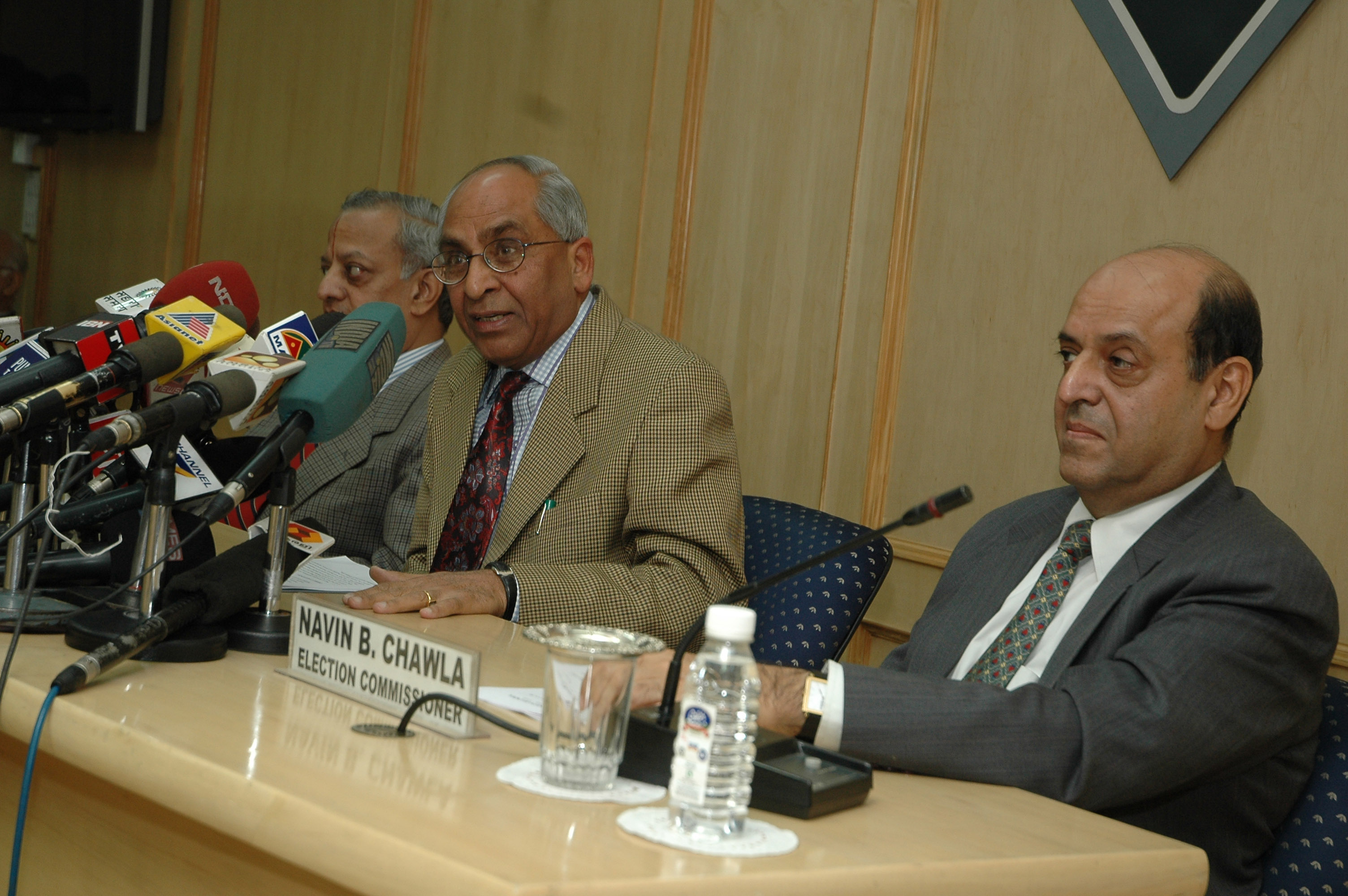
The Chief Election Commissioner of India, B.B. Tandon, holding a press conference in New Delhi on March 1, 2006, to announce the schedule for Legislative Assembly election of Assam along with those of Tamil Nadu, Kerala, West Bengal, and Puducherry.

The election schedule is as follows:

Poll event	Phase 1	Phase 2
Issue of notification of election	Friday Mar 10, 2006	Friday Mar 17, 2006
Last date for filing nomination	Friday March 17, 2006	Friday March 24, 2006
Scrutiny of nominations	Saturday March 18, 2006	Saturday March 25, 2006
Withdrawal of candidature	Monday March 20, 2006	Monday March 27, 2006
Date of poll	Monday April 3, 2006	Monday April 10, 2006
Date of counting	Thursday May 11, 2006	Thursday May 11, 2006
Date of completion	Saturday May 20, 2006	Saturday May 20, 2006

== Results ==
Party	Votes	%	Seats
Indian National Congress	4,102,479	31.08	53
Asom Gana Parishad	2,692,123	20.39	24
Bharatiya Janata Party	1,581,925	11.98	10
Assam United Democratic Front	1,191,500	9.03	10
Asom Gana Parishad Pragtisheel	331,491	2.51	1
Nationalist Congress Party	281,038	2.13	1
Communist Party of India (Marxist)	188,901	1.43	2
Communist Party of India	134,438	1.02	1
Autonomous State Demand Committee	117,941	0.89	1
Communist Party of India (Marxist–Leninist) Liberation	99,881	0.76	0
Trinamool Gana Parishad	89,649	0.68	0
Samajwadi Party	80,538	0.61	0
Loko Sanmilon	32,511	0.25	1
Navbharat Nirman Party	21,060	0.16	0
Lok Jan Shakti Party	13,797	0.10	0
Janata Dal (United)	12,337	0.09	0
Rashtriya Janata Dal	7,476	0.06	0
Revolutionary Socialist Party	7,059	0.05	0
United Reservation Movement Council of Assam	4,541	0.03	0
National Loktantrik Party	3,595	0.03	0
Janata Dal (Secular)	3,261	0.02	0
Revolutionary Communist Party of India (Rasik Bhatt)	2,129	0.02	0
All India Minorities Front	2,027	0.02	0
Samata Party	1,646	0.01	0
United Minorities Front, Assam	1,427	0.01	0
Muslim League Kerala State Committee	1,180	0.01	0
Hindusthan Suraksha Party	915	0.01	0
Navbharat Nirman Party	850	0.01	0
Republican Party of India	587	0.00	0
Lok Shakti	500	0.00	0
Independents	2,191,167	16.60	21
Total	13,199,969	100.00	125
Valid votes	13,199,969	99.98	
Invalid/blank votes	2,311	0.02	
Total votes	13,202,280	100.00	
Registered voters/turnout	17,434,019	75.73	
Source: ECI

== Elected members ==
#	Constituency	Reserved for (SC/ST/None)	Member	Party
1	Ratabari	SC	Sambhu Singh Mallah	Bharatiya Janata Party
2	Patharkandi	None	Kartik Sena Sinha	Bharatiya Janata Party
3	Karimganj North	None	Mission Ranjan Das	Bharatiya Janata Party
4	Karimganj South	None	Siddeque Ahmed	Independent
5	Badarpur	None	Anwarul Hoque	Assam United Democratic Front
6	Hailakandi	None	Hazi Salim Uddin Barbhuiya	Assam United Democratic Front
7	Katlicherra	None	Gautam Roy	Indian National Congress
8	Algapur	None	Rahul Roy	Indian National Congress
9	Silchar	None	Bithika Dev	Indian National Congress
10	Sonai	None	Kutub Ahmed Mazumder	Indian National Congress
11	Dholai	SC	Parimal Suklabaidya	Bharatiya Janata Party
12	Udharbond	None	Ajit Singh	Indian National Congress
13	Lakhipur	None	Dinesh Prasad Goala	Indian National Congress
14	Barkhola	None	Rumi Nath	Bharatiya Janata Party
15	Katigora	None	Ataur Rahman Mazarbhuiya	Assam United Democratic Front
16	Haflong	ST	Gobinda Ch. Langthasa	Indian National Congress
17	Bokajan	ST	Jagat Sing Engti	Autonomous State Demand Committee
18	Howraghat	ST	Khor Sing Engti	Indian National Congress
19	Diphu	ST	Bidya Sing Engleng	Indian National Congress
20	Baithalangso	ST	Dr. Mansing Rongpi	Indian National Congress
21	Mankachar	None	Dr. Motiur Rohman Mondal	Independent
22	Salmara South	None	Badruddin Ajmal	Assam United Democratic Front
23	Dhubri	None	Rasul Hoque	Assam United Democratic Front
24	Gauripur	None	Mohibul Haque	Independent
25	Golakganj	None	Abu Taher Bepari	Indian National Congress
26	Bilasipara West	None	Hafiz Bashir Ahmed	Assam United Democratic Front
27	Bilasipara East	None	Prasanta Kumar Barua	Asom Gana Parishad
28	Gossaigaon	None	Majendra Narzary	Independent
29	Kokrajhar West	ST	Parameswar Brahma	Independent
30	Kokrajhar East	ST	Promila Rani Brahma	Independent
31	Sidli	ST	Chandan Brahma	Independent
32	Bongaigaon	None	Phani Bhusan Choudhury	Asom Gana Parishad
33	Bijni	None	Kamal Shing Narzary	Independent
34	Abhayapuri North	None	Abdul Hai Nagori	Indian National Congress
35	Abhayapuri South	SC	Rabin Banikya	Asom Gana Parishad
36	Dudhnai	ST	Deben Daimary	Indian National Congress
37	Goalpara East	None	Dulal Chandra Ghosh	Nationalist Congress Party
38	Goalpara West	None	Abdur Rashid Mandal	Indian National Congress
39	Jaleswar	None	Afzalur Rahman	Loko Sanmilon
40	Sorbhog	None	Uddhab Barman	Communist Party of India
41	Bhabanipur	None	Dr. Manoranjan Das	Asom Gana Parishad
42	Patacharkuchi	None	Dr.malaya Borman	Indian National Congress
43	Barpeta	None	Gunindra Nath Das	Asom Gana Parishad
44	Jania	None	Abdul Khaleque	Indian National Congress
45	Baghbar	None	Dildar Rezza	Indian National Congress
46	Sarukhetri	None	Tara Prasad Das	Independent
47	Chenga	None	Liakat Ali Khan	Asom Gana Parishad
48	Boko	SC	Jyoti Prasad Das	Asom Gana Parishad
49	Chaygaon	None	Dr. Kamala Kanta Kalita	Asom Gana Parishad
50	Palasbari	None	Pranab Kalita	Independent
51	Jalukbari	None	Himanta Biswa Sarma	Indian National Congress
52	Dispur	None	Akon Bora	Indian National Congress
53	Gauhati East	None	Captain Robin Bordoloi	Indian National Congress
54	Gauhati West	None	Ramendra Narayan Kalita	Asom Gana Parishad
55	Hajo	None	Nurul Hussain	Asom Gana Parishad
56	Kamalpur	None	Uttara Kalita	Indian National Congress
57	Rangiya	None	Ananta Deka	Communist Party of India
58	Tamulpur	None	Chandi Basumatary	Independent
59	Nalbari	None	Alaka Sarma	Asom Gana Parishad
60	Barkhetry	None	Dr.bhumidhar Barman	Indian National Congress
61	Dharmapur	None	Chandra Mohan Patowary	Asom Gana Parishad
62	Barama	ST	Maneswar Brahma	Independent
63	Chapaguri	ST	Thaneswar Basumatary	Independent
64	Panery	None	Kamali Basumatari	Independent
65	Kalaigaon	None	Maheswar Baro	Independent
66	Sipajhar	None	Binanda Kumar Saikia	Indian National Congress
67	Mangaldoi	SC	Hiren Das	Asom Gana Parishad
68	Dalgaon	None	Ilias Ali	Independent
69	Udalguri	ST	Rihon Daimari	Independent
70	Majbat	None	Karendra Basumatary	Independent
71	Dhekiajuli	None	Joseph Toppo	Asom Gana Parishad
72	Barchalla	None	Tanka Bahadur Rai	Indian National Congress
73	Tezpur	None	Brindaban Goswami	Asom Gana Parishad
74	Rangapara	None	Abhijit Hazarika	Bharatiya Janata Party
75	Sootea	None	Padma Hazarika	Asom Gana Parishad
76	Biswanath	None	Nurjamal Sarkar	Indian National Congress
77	Behali	None	Ranjit Dutta	Bharatiya Janata Party
78	Gohpur	None	Ripun Bora	Indian National Congress
79	Jagiroad	SC	Bibekananda Dalai	Indian National Congress
80	Marigaon	None	Jonjonali Baruah	Indian National Congress
81	Laharighat	None	Dr. Nazrul Islam	Indian National Congress
82	Raha	SC	Guneswar Das	Assam United Democratic Front
83	Dhing	None	Mobarak Ali Pathan	Assam United Democratic Front
84	Batadroba	None	Gautam Bora	Indian National Congress
85	Rupohihat	None	Abdul Aziz	Asom Gana Parishad
86	Nowgong	None	Girindra Kumar Boruah	Asom Gana Parishad
87	Barhampur	None	Prafulla Kumar Mahanta	Asom Gana Parishad Pragtisheel
88	Samaguri	None	Rockybul Hussain	Indian National Congress
89	Kaliabor	None	Keshab Mahanta	Asom Gana Parishad
90	Jamunamukh	None	Badruddin Ajmal	Assam United Democratic Front
91	Hojai	None	Dr. Aditya Langthasa	Assam United Democratic Front
92	Lumding	None	Sushil Dutta	Bharatiya Janata Party
93	Bokakhat	None	Jiten Gogoi	Independent
94	Sarupathar	None	Binod Gowala.	Asom Gana Parishad
95	Golaghat	None	Ajanta Neog	Indian National Congress
96	Khumtai	None	Probin Gogoi	Asom Gana Parishad
97	Dergaon	SC	Sushila Hazarika	Asom Gana Parishad
98	Jorhat	None	Rana Goswami	Indian National Congress
99	Majuli	ST	Rajib Lochan Pegu	Indian National Congress
100	Titabar	None	Tarun Gogoi	Indian National Congress
101	Mariani	None	Rupjyoti Kurmi	Indian National Congress
102	Teok	None	Membar Gogoi	Indian National Congress
103	Amguri	None	Prodip Hazarika	Asom Gana Parishad
104	Nazira	None	Drupad Borgohain	Communist Party of India
105	Mahmara	None	Sarat Saikia	Indian National Congress
106	Sonari	None	Sarat Borkataky	Indian National Congress
107	Thowra	None	Kushal Dowari	Independent
108	Sibsagar	None	Pranab Gogoi	Indian National Congress
109	Bihpuria	None	Bhupen Kumar Borah	Indian National Congress
110	Naoboicha	None	Sanjay Raj Subba	Independent
111	Lakhimpur	None	Ghana Buragohain	Indian National Congress
112	Dhakuakhana	ST	Bharat Chandra Narah	Indian National Congress
113	Dhemaji	ST	Sumitra Patir	Indian National Congress
114	Jonai	ST	Bhubon Pegu	Independent
115	Moran	None	Jibantara Ghatowar	Indian National Congress
116	Dibrugarh	None	Prasanta Phukan	Bharatiya Janata Party
117	Lahowal	None	Prithibi Mahji	Indian National Congress
118	Duliajan	None	Rameshwar Teli	Bharatiya Janata Party
119	Tingkhong	None	Anup Phukan	Asom Gana Parishad
120	Naharkatia	None	Pranati Phukan	Indian National Congress
121	Chabua	None	Raju Sahu	Indian National Congress
122	Tinsukia	None	Rajendra Prasad Singh	Indian National Congress
123	Digboi	None	Rameswar Dhanowar	Indian National Congress
124	Margherita	None	Pradyut Bordoloi	Indian National Congress
125	Doom Dooma	None	Durga Bhumij	Indian National Congress
126	Sadiya	None	Bolin Chetia	Indian National Congress

== Aftermath ==
The Indian National Congress won 53 seats in the assembly. The party had a pre-election tactical seat-sharing agreement with Hagrama Mohilary, whose supporters won 11 seats as independents and joined the Bodoland People's Front (BPF). The Congress and the BPF subsequently formed a coalition government which returned to power in the 2011 elections. The election broke the cycle of govts changing every election cycle that had been in the state since 1972, with Tarun Gogoi led-Congress party retaining their majority in the house and Gogoi becoming the CM second of his consecutive 3 terms.
