= Akon Bora =

Indian politician

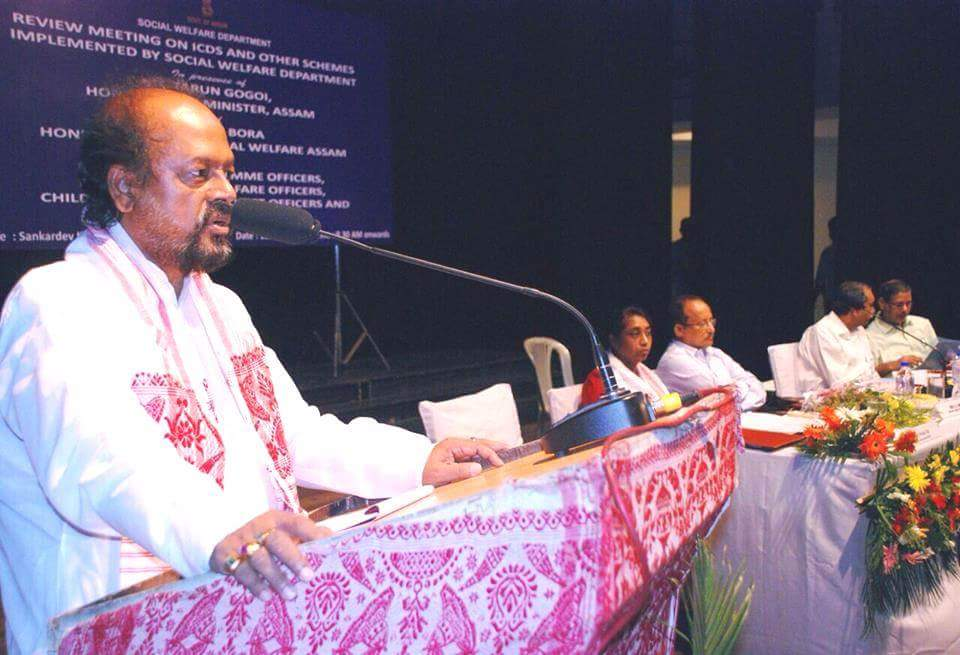
- Akon Bora during a speech

Cabinet Minister, Government of Assam
- In office 3 September 2008 – 26 January 2015
- Chief Minister: Tarun Gogoi
- Portfolios: Social Welfare; Jails
- Preceded by: Ajanta Neog
- Succeeded by: Tarun Gogoi (Social Welfare); Girindra Mallik (Jails)

Member, Assam Legislative Assembly
- In office 11 May 2006 – 19 May 2016
- Preceded by: Robin Bordoloi
- Succeeded by: Atul Bora Sr.
- Constituency: Dispur

Personal details
- Born: 1 December 1952 (age 73) Majuli, Assam
- Party: Indian National Congress
- Spouse: Parul Bora (m. 1975)
- Children: 2
- Education: B.A (Political science)

Akon Bora (born 1 December 1952) is an Indian politician from the state of Assam. As a member of the Indian National Congress, he was elected to the Assam Legislative Assembly in the 2006 and 2011 elections from the Dispur constituency.

== Early life ==
Bora was born in Majuli, Assam to Dharmeshwar Bora and Doibaki Bora. He graduated with a Bachelor of Arts degree in political science.

== Career ==
He has held the position of General Secretary, APCC from 1986 to 2009, General Secretary of NECCC and as a member of AICC. He is also a patron and advisor in various Bihu Committees, Social Groups, Mandir Committees and Private Organisations.

== Personal life ==
He married Parul Bora on 3 March 1975. They have a son and a daughter. Bora resided in Seuj Nagar, Beltola in Guwahati.
