= Gautam Bora =

Indian politician

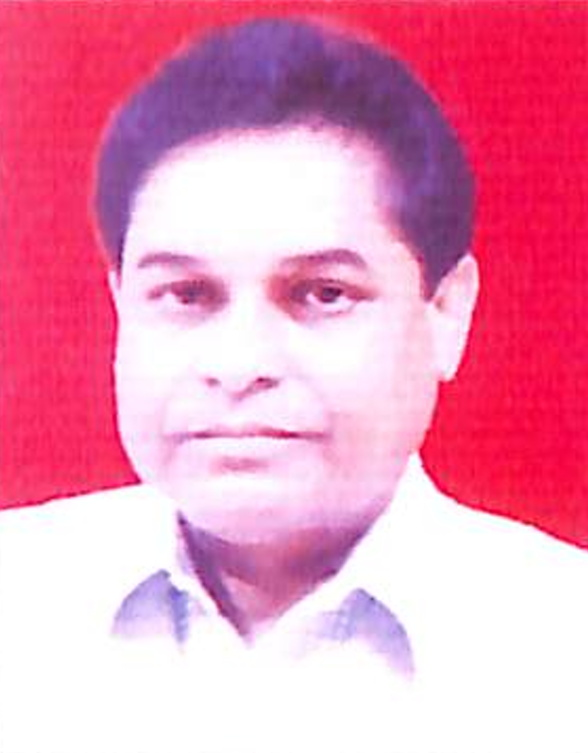
- Official portrait

Cabinet Minister, Assam
- In office 21 May 2006 – 18 May 2011
- Chief Minister: Tarun Gogoi
- Departments: Cultural Affairs (2006–2008); Sports and Youth Welfare (2006–2008); Co-operation (2006–2008); Elementary Education (2008); Education (2008–2011)
- Preceded by: Tarun Gogoi (Cultural Affairs); Pradyut Bordoloi (Sports); Misbahul Islam Laskar (Co-operation); Ripun Bora (Education)
- Succeeded by: Bharat Narah (Cultural Affairs, Sports, Co-operation); Himanta Biswa Sarma (Education)

Minister of State (Independent Charge), Assam
- In office 22 April 1995 – 22 April 1996
- Chief Minister: Hiteswar Saikia
- Department: Social Forestry and Wildlife

Minister of State, Assam
- In office 30 June 1991 – 22 April 1996
- Chief Minister: Hiteswar Saikia
- Departments: Health and Family Welfare; Primary, Secondary and Adult Education

Member, Assam Legislative Assembly
- In office 2001–2016
- Preceded by: Digen Chandra Borah
- Succeeded by: Angoorlata Deka
- Constituency: Batadroba
- In office 1991–1996
- Preceded by: Digen Chandra Borah
- Succeeded by: Digen Chandra Borah

Personal details
- Party: Bharatiya Janata Party
- Other political affiliations: Indian National Congress
- Occupation: Politician

Gautam Bora is an Indian politician from the state of Assam. He was a four-term member of the Assam Legislative Assembly and a minister in the Hiteswar Saikia Government and later in the Tarun Gogoi Government. He is a former Indian and German film director and actor.

== Political career ==
Bora was a member of Indian National Congress since the time of his entry into politics. He stayed loyal to the party in both good and bad times, even during the mass erosion of INC leaders into the saffron party in 2015.

However he resigned from the membership of INC on 20 March 2021 on the grounds of lobby-centred politics and lack of leadership in the party.

Currently Bora is a member of Bharatiya Janata Party. He joined the BJP on 22 March 2021.

Since then, Bora has emerged as a strong contender for the BJP’s MLA ticket from the newly formed Dhing constituency, owing to his clean public image and considerable support base, particularly in minority-dominated areas.

=== Posts held ===
- Education Minister of Assam from 2011 to 2016.
- Cultural Affairs Minister.
- Forest Minister
- Health Minister

== Filmography ==
=== Director ===
- An Autumn in the Little Country of Bärwalde (1983)
- Wosobipo (1988)
- The Mishings: Sons of Abotani (1991)
- An Unending Expanse (2008)
- The Old Man (2012)

=== Writer ===
- An Autumn in the Little Country of Bärwalde (1983)
- Wosobipo (1988)

=== Actor ===
- Dil Se (1998) as terrorist leader
