= Rakibul Hussain =

Indian politician

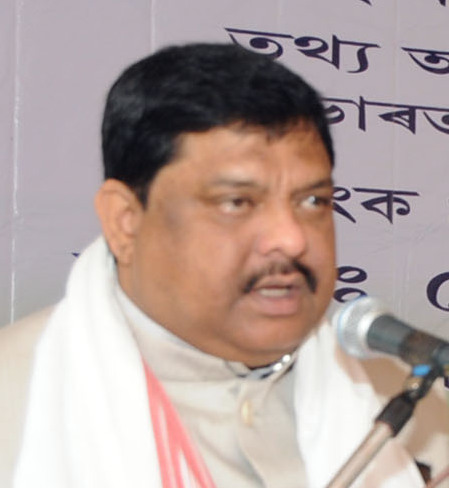
- Official portrait, 2014

Member of Parliament, Lok Sabha
- Incumbent
- Assumed office 4 June 2024
- Preceded by: Badruddin Ajmal
- Constituency: Dhubri

Member of the Assam Legislative Assembly
- In office 13 May 2001 – 4 June 2024
- Preceded by: Atul Kumar Sharma
- Succeeded by: Diplu Ranjan Sarmah
- Constituency: Samaguri

Cabinet Minister, Government of Assam
- In office 21 May 2006 – 24 May 2016
- Chief Minister: Tarun Gogoi
- Ministry and Departments: Forest; Environment; Panchayat & Rural Development; Tourism; Information; Public Relations; Printing & Stationery
- Preceded by: Chandan Brahma
- Succeeded by: Naba Kumar Doley

Minister of State, Government of Assam
- In office 7 June 2002 – 21 May 2006
- Chief Minister: Tarun Gogoi
- Ministry and Departments: Home; Passport; HAJ, BAD; Information & Technology; Printing & Stationery; Jail & Home Guards; Border Area; Development
- Preceded by: Abdul Jabbar
- Succeeded by: Rihon Daimary

Deputy Leader of the Opposition Assam Legislative Assembly
- In office 20 May 2021 – 4 June 2024

Personal details
- Born: 7 August 1964 (age 61) Nagaon, Assam, India
- Party: Indian National Congress
- Education: Nowgong College (BA); Aligarh Muslim University (MA)
- Profession: Politician, social worker

Rakibul Hussain (born 7 August 1964) is an Indian politician from Assam currently serving as the Member of Parliament from Dhubri Lok Sabha constituency since 2024. He was the Deputy Leader of the Opposition in the Assam Legislative Assembly from 2021 to 2024. He was a five-term MLA from Samaguri constituency from 2001 to 2024. He served as a Minister of State in the first Tarun Gogoi-led Indian National Congress government from 2002 to 2006, and served as a cabinet minister in the second and third Congress governments under Tarun Gogoi from 2006 to 2016.

== Biography ==
Rakibul Hussain was born to Alhaz Nurul Hussain on 7 August 1964. He graduated from Aligarh Muslim University with a MA in Political Science. He was elected as the MLA of Samaguri constituency in the Assam Legislative Assembly for the Indian National Congress in 2001, and was re-elected in 2006, 2011, 2016, and 2021. He served as the Deputy Leader of the Opposition from 2021 to 2024.

Hussain served as Minister of State in the first Tarun Gogoi government from 2002 to 2006, including portfolios such as Home, Border Area, and Haj. He served as a Cabinet Minister under Tarun Gogoi from 2006 to 2016, holding portfolios such as Forest and Environment, Panchayat and Rural Development, Tourism, Information and Public Relations, and Printing and Stationery. In the 2024 Indian general election, Hussain was the Indian National Congress candidate from Dhubri and won the election against the All India United Democratic Front candidate and President, Badruddin Ajmal, recording one of the largest margins in Indian electoral history, with 1,012,476 votes.

Hussain was general secretary of Assam Olympic Association. In 2015, he became president of All India Carrom Federation.
