= Lok Bhavan, Guwahati =

Residence of the Governor of Assam

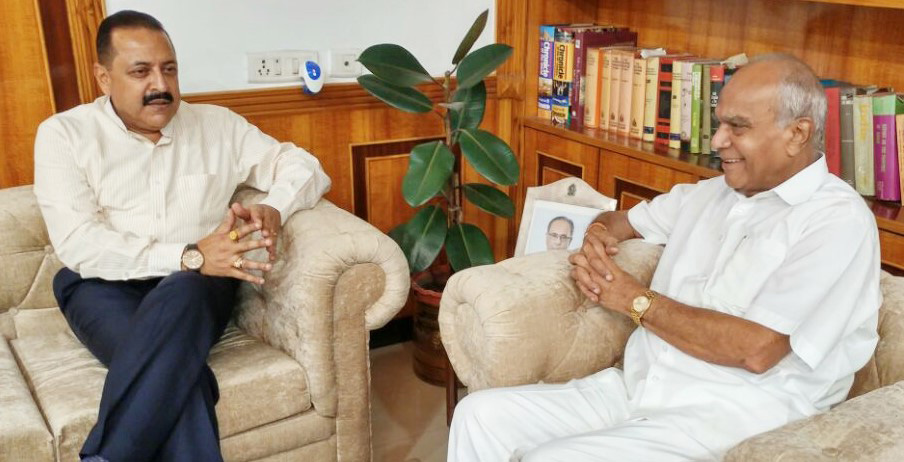
- Jitendra Singh meeting the Governor of Assam, Shri Banwarilal Purohit, at the Raj Bhawan in Guwahati
- Interactive map of the Lok Bhavan, Guwahati area

General information
- Coordinates: 26.197731°N 91.765708°E
- Current tenants: Lakshman Acharya
- Owner: Government of Assam

Lok Bhavan formerly (translation: Government House) is the official residence of the Current Governor of Assam. It is located in the capital city of Guwahati, Assam.

== See also ==
- Government Houses of the British Indian Empire
