= Second Sarma ministry =

Government of Assam, India since 2026

- 24th Ministry of Assam

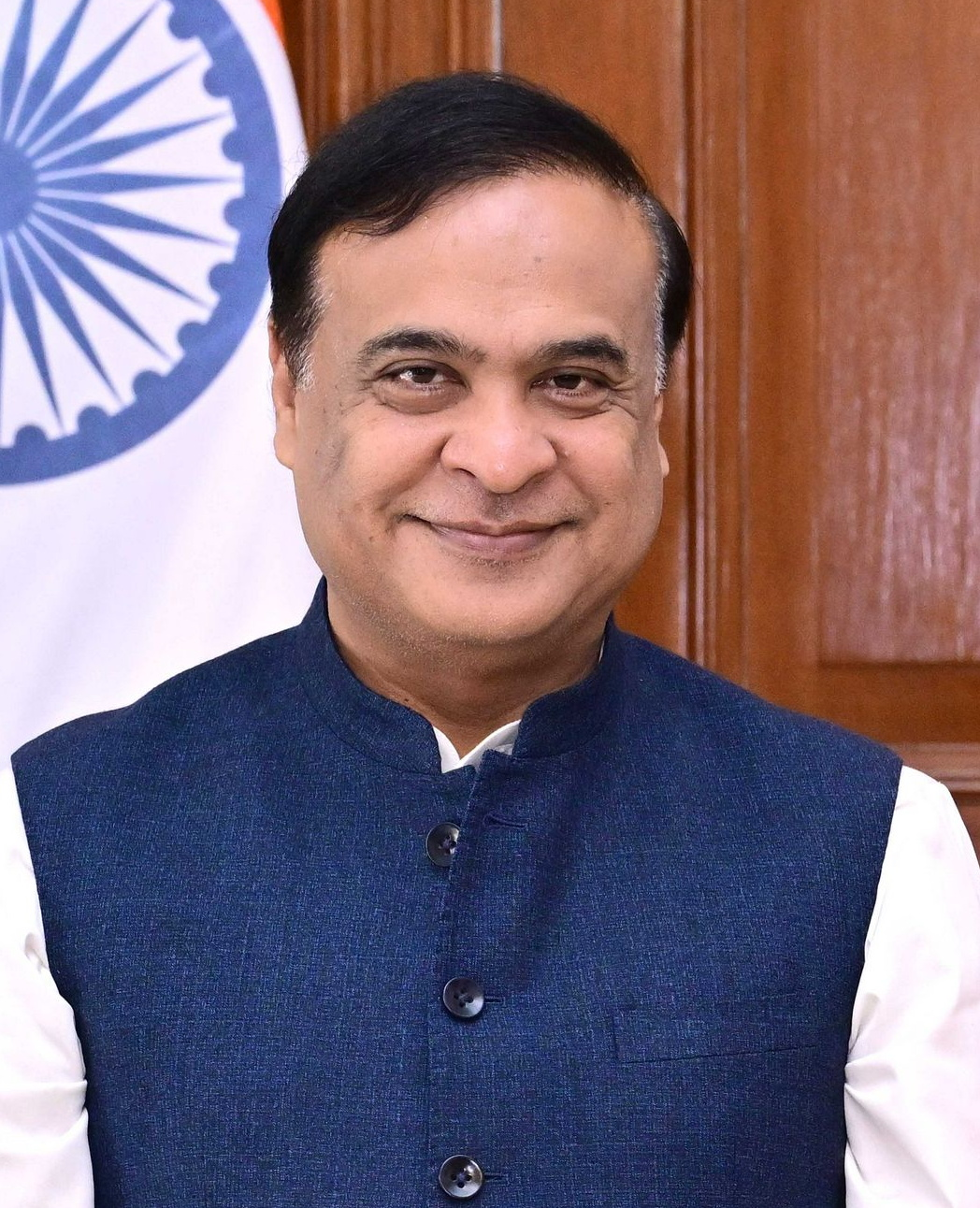
- Chief Minister Himanta Biswa Sarma
- Date formed: 12 May 2026

People and organisations
- Governor: Lakshaman Acharya
- Chief Minister: Himanta Biswa Sarma
- No. of ministers: 17
- Member parties: Bharatiya Janata Party; Asom Gana Parishad; Bodoland People's Front
- Status in legislature: Majority
- Opposition party: Indian National Congress

History
- Election: 2026
- Legislature term: 5 years
- Predecessor: First Sarma ministry

The Second Sarma ministry is the 24th and current council of ministers of the Government of Assam which has been in office since 12 May 2026. The ministry is headed by Chief Minister Himanta Biswa Sarma.

== Background ==
The ruling Bharatiya Janata Party (BJP), along with its allies, the Asom Gana Parishad (AGP) and the Bodoland People's Front (BPF) contested the election to the Assam Legislative Assembly and won 102 seats, with the BJP itself winning 82 seats, the AGP 10 seats and the BPF 10 seats. The opposition led by the Indian National Congress (INC) won 19 seats.

On 10 May 2026, BJP observers – Union Minister and former BJP National President Jagat Prakash Nadda and Haryana Chief Minister Nayab Singh Saini held meetings with the newly elected BJP legislators and those from the alliance parties, and unanimously re-elected Himanta Biswa Sarma as the leader of the BJP and NDA legislative party and hence the chief minister. The same day, Sarma, along with the two observers and several other leaders, met Governor Lakshman Acharya and staked claim to form the government.

== Cabinet formation ==
Chief Minister Himanta Biswa Sarma was sworn in on 12 May 2026 by Governor Lakshman Acharya along with a cabinet of four ministers. The ministers were Rameswar Teli and Ajanta Neog from the BJP, Atul Bora from the AGP, and Charan Boro from the BPF. On 5 June 2026, the cabinet was expanded for the first time, and 12 ministers were inducted. All of the ministers, excluding Keshab Mahanta, belonged to the BJP. Among the 12 ministers, four of them were first-time ministers.

=== Did not join the cabinet ===
The following ministers who served in the first Sarma ministry were not reappointed:

- Ranjeet Kumar Dass, won reelection, became Speaker of the Legislative Assembly
- Jogen Mohan, elected to the Rajya Sabha
- Nandita Garlosa, left BJP, joined INC and lost reelection
- Urkhao Gwra Brahma, lost reelection and left NDA to join UPPL
- Chandra Mohan Patowary, won reelection
- Prasanta Phukan, won reelection
- Rupesh Gowala, won reelection
- Parimal Suklabaidya, elected to the Lok Sabha
- Sanjoy Kishan, won reelection

=== New ministers ===
The following members became new ministers in the cabinet:

- Ashwini Roy Sarkar
- Biswajit Daimary
- Nilima Devi
- Sushanta Borgohain

== Council of Ministers ==
Portfolio	Minister	Took office	Left office	Party
Chief Minister and also in-charge of: Department of Home and Political; Department of Public Works (Buildings and National Highways); Department of Public Works (Roads); Department of Power; Department of Information, Public Relations, Printing and Stationery; All other departments not allocated to any Minister.	Himanta Biswa Sarma	12 May 2026	Incumbent	BJP
Minister of Transformation and Development; Minister of Labour Welfare; Minister of Tea Tribes and Adivasi Welfare	Rameswar Teli	12 May 2026	Incumbent	BJP
Minister of Panchayat and Rural Development; Minister of Implementation of Assam Accord; Minister of Border Protection and Development; Minister of Excise	Atul Bora	12 May 2026	Incumbent	AGP
Minister of Transport; Minister of Welfare of Bodoland	Charan Boro	12 May 2026	Incumbent	BPF
Minister of Women and Child Development; Minister of Tourism	Ajanta Neog	12 May 2026	Incumbent	BJP
Minister of Parliamentary Affairs
Minister of Parliamentary Affairs	Pijush Hazarika	5 June 2026	Incumbent	BJP
Minister of Social Justice and Empowerment; Minister of Soil Conservation; Minister of Welfare of Minorities and Development
Minister of Social Justice and Empowerment; Minister of Soil Conservation; Minister of Welfare of Minorities and Development	Ashwini Roy Sarkar	5 June 2026	Incumbent	BJP
Minister of Health and Family Welfare; Minister of Medical Education and Research
Minister of Health and Family Welfare; Minister of Medical Education and Research	Ashok Singhal	5 June 2026	Incumbent	BJP
Minister of Cultural Affairs; Minister of Industries, Commerce and Public Enterprises; Minister of Act East Policy Affairs
Minister of Cultural Affairs; Minister of Industries, Commerce and Public Enterprises; Minister of Act East Policy Affairs	Bimal Bora	5 June 2026	Incumbent	BJP
Minister of Handloom, Textiles and Sericulture; Minister of Sports and Youth Welfare; Minister of Skill, Employment and Entrepreneurship; Minister of Indigenous and Tribal Faith and Culture
Minister of Handloom, Textiles and Sericulture; Minister of Sports and Youth Welfare; Minister of Skill, Employment and Entrepreneurship; Minister of Indigenous and Tribal Faith and Culture	Biswajit Daimary	5 June 2026	Incumbent	BJP
Minister of Finance; Minister of Environment and Forest; Minister of Mines and Minerals
Minister of Finance; Minister of Environment and Forest; Minister of Mines and Minerals	Jayanta Malla Baruah	5 June 2026	Incumbent	BJP
Minister of Food, Public Distribution and Consumer Affairs; Minister of Housing and Urban Affairs; Minister of Cooperation
Minister of Food, Public Distribution and Consumer Affairs; Minister of Housing and Urban Affairs; Minister of Cooperation	Kaushik Rai	5 June 2026	Incumbent	BJP
Minister of Revenue and Disaster Management; Minister of Science, Technology and Climate Change; Minister of General Administration
Minister of Revenue and Disaster Management; Minister of Science, Technology and Climate Change; Minister of General Administration	Keshab Mahanta	5 June 2026	Incumbent	AGP
Minister of Public Health Engineering; Minister of Hill Areas Development; Minister of Barak Valley Development
Minister of Public Health Engineering; Minister of Hill Areas Development; Minister of Barak Valley Development	Krishnendu Paul	5 June 2026	Incumbent	BJP
Minister of Animal Husbandry and Veterinary; Minister of Fisheries
Minister of Animal Husbandry and Veterinary; Minister of Fisheries	Nilima Devi	5 June 2026	Incumbent	BJP
Minister of Agriculture; Minister of Irrigation
Minister of Agriculture; Minister of Irrigation	Pijush Hazarika	5 June 2026	Incumbent	BJP
Minister of School Education; Minister of Higher Education; Minister of Tribal Affairs (Plains); Minister of Information Technology
Minister of School Education; Minister of Higher Education; Minister of Tribal Affairs (Plains); Minister of Information Technology	Ranoj Pegu	5 June 2026	Incumbent	BJP
Minister of Water Resources; Minister of Judicial
Minister of Water Resources; Minister of Judicial	Sushanta Borgohain	5 June 2026	Incumbent	BJP

== Demographics ==
Division	Party		
Division	Bharatiya Janata Party	Asom Gana Parishad	Bodoland People's Front
North Assam Division	3 (Ashok Singhal, Ranoj Pegu, Nilima Devi)		1 (Charan Boro)
Upper Assam division	4 (Ajanta Neog, Bimal Bora, Rameswar Teli, Sushanta Borgohain)	1 (Atul Bora)	
Lower Assam division	4 (Himanta Biswa Sarma, Ashwini Roy Sarkar, Biswajit Daimary, Jayanta Malla Baruah)		
Central Assam division	1 (Pijush Hazarika)	1 (Keshab Mahanta)	
Barak Valley	2 (Krishnendu Paul, Kaushik Rai)		
Total	14	2	1
