= First Sarma ministry =

Government of Assam, India (2021–2026)

- 23rd Ministry of Assam

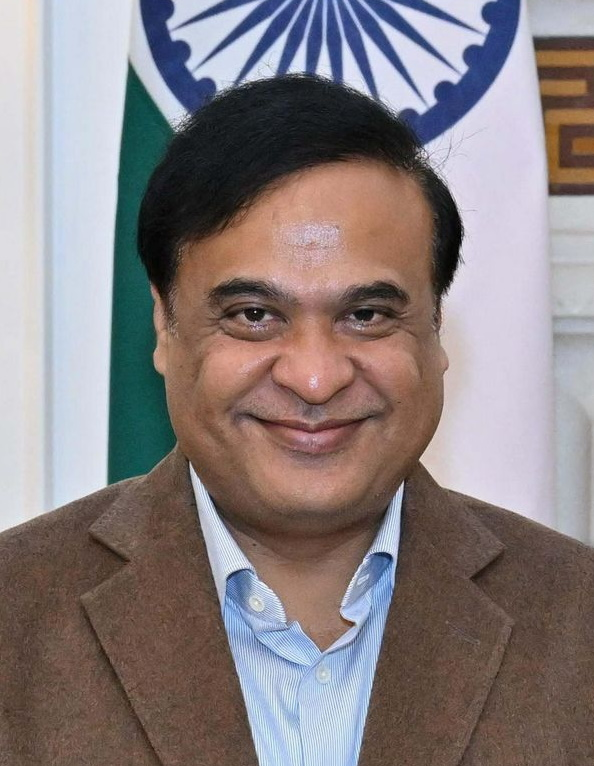
- Chief Minister Himanta Biswa Sarma
- Date formed: 10 May 2021
- Date dissolved: 11 May 2026

People and organisations
- Governor: Jagdish Mukhi, until 20 February 2023; Gulab Chand Kataria, 22 February 2023–31 July 2024; Lakshaman Acharya, from 31 July 2024
- Chief Minister: Himanta Biswa Sarma
- Member parties: Bharatiya Janata Party; Asom Gana Parishad; United People's Party Liberal; Bodoland People's Front
- Status in legislature: Coalition
- Opposition party: Indian National Congress
- Opposition leader: Debabrata Saikia

History
- Election: 2021
- Legislature term: 5 years
- Predecessor: Sonowal ministry
- Successor: Second Sarma ministry

The First Sarma ministry was the 23rd council of ministers of the Government of Assam which was in office from 10 May 2021 until 11 May 2026. The ministry was headed by Chief Minister Himanta Biswa Sarma and consisted of 16 cabinet ministers. The chief minister and 14 other ministers were sworn in into office by Governor Jagdish Mukhi on 10 May 2021.

== Background ==
The ruling Bharatiya Janata Party (BJP) along with its allies, the Asom Gana Parishad (AGP) and the United People's Party Liberal (UPPL) contested the election to the Assam Legislative Assembly and won 75 seats with the BJP itself winning in 60 seats, the AGP in 9 and the UPPL in 6 seats. The opposition led by Indian National Congress won 50 seats and an independent candidate won a seat.

After the election results were out on 2 May 2021, it was widely speculated that incumbent chief minister Sarbananda Sonowal could be re-appointed for a second term in office while his senior ministerial colleague Himanta Biswa Sarma was too a forerunner. Eventually, BJP observers- Union Agriculture Minister Narendra Singh Tomar and National General Secretary Arun Singh held meetings with the newly elected BJP legislators and the other legislators from the alliance parties and unanimously elected Himanta Biswa Sarma as the leader of the legislative party and hence as the chief minister. Outgoing chief minister Sarbananda Sonowal tendered his resignation to the Governor Jagdish Mukhi on 9 May 2021 paving way for Sarma to be sworn in the next day.

Sarma was eventually sworn in as the state's 15th Chief Minister on 10 May 2021 along with the 14 other cabinet ministers who were all administered oath by the governor. Among attendees included BJP National President Jagat Prakash Nadda, outgoing Chief Minister Sarbananda Sonowal, Chief Ministers Biplab Deb of Tripura, Conrad Sangma of Meghalaya, N. Biren Singh of Manipur and Neiphiu Rio of Nagaland.

Sarbananda Sonowal was inducted into the union council of ministers on 7 July 2021 and was appointed as the Union Cabinet Minister of Ports, Shipping and Waterways and AYUSH. He resigned as a member of the Assam Legislative Assembly on 29 September 2021 after being elected as a member of the Rajya Sabha for Assam.

== Composition ==
Chief Minister Himanta Biswa Sarma was sworn in along with 13 other ministers which included 10 BJP legislators, namely Ranjeet Kumar Dass, Chandra Mohan Patowary, Parimal Suklabaidya, Ranoj Pegu, Ashok Singhal, Jogen Mohan, Sanjoy Kishan, Ajanta Neog, Pijush Hazarika and Bimal Bora; 2 AGP legislators namely Atul Bora and Keshab Mahanta and one UPPL legislator Urkhao Gwra Brahma. Patowary, Suklabaidya, Bora and Mahanta were cabinets in the outgoing government while Hazarika, Mohan and Kishan were ministers of state (independent charge). The chief minister himself along with his colleague Ajanta Neog served as ministers under the Congress government of Tarun Gogoi while Pijush Hazarika was a parliamentary secretary.

The ministry was expanded on 9 June 2022 with the induction of two BJP legislators Nandita Garlosa and Jayanta Malla Baruah as cabinet ministers.

== Changes ==
- On 20 July 2021, the Department of Urban Development and the Department of Guwahati Development were merged to form the Department of Housing and Urban Affairs.
- On 30 July 2021, the Department of Indigenous Faith and Culture was created.
- On 5 May 2022, the Department of Health and Family Welfare was bifurcated into two separate departments, namely, the Department of Health and Family Welfare and the Department of Medical Education and Research.
- On 8 June 2022, the following departments were created:
  - The Directorate of Women and Child Development under Social Welfare Department was separated and the Department of Women and Child Development was formed.
  - The Directorate of Social Justice and Empowerment under Social Welfare Department was separated and the Department of Social Justice and Empowerment was formed.
  - The Department of Welfare of Plain Tribes and Backward Classes Department was renamed into the Department of Tribal Affairs (Plains), while the Directorate of Welfare of Scheduled Castes was placed under the newly created department of social justice and empowerment.
- A cabinet reshuffle took place on 9 June 2022. Two ministers - Nandita Garlosa and Jayanta Malla Baruah, both of BJP were inducted and portfolios of several ministers were changed.
- A minor cabinet reshuffle took place on 23 May 2023 in which the portfolios of ministers Nandita Garlosa and Jogen Mohan were changed.
- On 18 June 2024, resignation of Minister Parimal Suklabaidya was accepted and a minor reshuffle took place. Health and Family Welfare Minister Keshab Mahanta was assigned the portfolio of Transport and relieved of the health department which was taken over by the chief minister.
- On 7 December 2024, a cabinet reshuffle took place and four ministers were inducted, viz. Prasanta Phukan, Kaushik Rai, Krishnendu Paul, and Rupesh Gowala, while Labour and Tea Tribes Welfare Minister Sanjoy Kishan was dropped from the ministry. Two days later, on 9 December, the portfolios were allotted to the new ministers while portfolios of several existing ministers were changed.

== Full council of ministers ==
Portfolio	Minister	Took office	Left office	Party
Chief Minister and also in-charge of: Department of Home; Department of Personnel; Department of Public Works; And all other departments not allocated to any Minister.	Himanta Biswa Sarma	10 May 2021	11 May 2026	BJP
Minister of General Administration	Himanta Biswa Sarma	11 May 2021	9 June 2022	BJP
Minister of General Administration	Ranjeet Kumar Dass	9 June 2022	11 May 2026	BJP
Minister of Judicial	Himanta Biswa Sarma	11 May 2021	9 December 2024	BJP
Minister of Judicial	Ranjeet Kumar Dass	9 December 2024	11 May 2026	BJP
Minister of Panchayat and Rural Development	Ranjeet Kumar Dass	11 May 2021	11 May 2026	BJP
Minister of Food, Public Distribution and Consumer Affairs; (Minister of Food and Civil Supplies and Consumer Affairs, until 2024)	Ranjeet Kumar Dass	11 May 2021	9 December 2024	BJP
Minister of Food, Public Distribution and Consumer Affairs; (Minister of Food and Civil Supplies and Consumer Affairs, until 2024)	Kaushik Rai	9 December 2024	11 May 2026	BJP
Minister of Public Health Engineering	Ranjeet Kumar Dass	11 May 2021	9 June 2022	BJP
Minister of Public Health Engineering	Jayanta Malla Baruah	9 June 2022	11 May 2026	BJP
Minister of Agriculture and Horticulture; Minister of Border Protection and Development; Minister of Implementation of Assam Accord	Atul Bora	11 May 2021	11 May 2026	AGP
Minister of Animal Husbandry and Veterinary	Atul Bora	11 May 2021	9 December 2024	AGP
Minister of Animal Husbandry and Veterinary	Krishnendu Paul	9 December 2024	11 May 2026	BJP
Minister of Cooperation	Atul Bora	11 May 2021	9 June 2022	AGP
Minister of Cooperation	Nandita Garlosa	9 June 2022	9 December 2024	BJP
Minister of Cooperation	Jogen Mohan	9 December 2024	11 May 2026	BJP
Minister of Handloom, Textiles and Sericulture; Minister of Soil Conservation	Urkhao Gwra Brahma	11 May 2021	11 May 2026	UPPL
Minister of Welfare of Bodoland; (Minister of Welfare of Plain Tribe and Backward Classes (BTC), until July 2021)	Urkhao Gwra Brahma	11 May 2021	18 October 2025	UPPL
Minister of Welfare of Bodoland; (Minister of Welfare of Plain Tribe and Backward Classes (BTC), until July 2021)	Charan Boro	18 October 2025	11 May 2026	BPF
Minister of Transport	Chandra Mohan Patowary	11 May 2021	9 June 2022	BJP
Minister of Transport	Parimal Suklabaidya	9 June 2022	18 June 2024	BJP
Minister of Transport	Keshab Mahanta	18 June 2024	9 December 2024	AGP
Minister of Transport	Jogen Mohan	9 December 2024	18 October 2025	BJP
Minister of Transport	Charan Boro	18 October 2025	11 May 2026	BPF
Minister of Industries and Commerce	Chandra Mohan Patowary	11 May 2021	9 June 2022	BJP
Minister of Industries and Commerce	Jayanta Malla Baruah	9 June 2022	9 December 2024	BJP
Minister of Industries and Commerce	Bimal Bora	9 December 2024	11 May 2026	BJP
Minister of Public Enterprises	Chandra Mohan Patowary	11 September 2021	9 June 2022	BJP
Minister of Public Enterprises	Bimal Bora	9 June 2022	11 May 2026	BJP
Minister of Skill, Employment and Entrepreneurship	Chandra Mohan Patowary	11 May 2021	9 June 2022	BJP
Minister of Skill, Employment and Entrepreneurship	Jayanta Malla Baruah	9 June 2022	9 December 2024	BJP
Minister of Skill, Employment and Entrepreneurship	Prasanta Phukan	9 December 2024	11 May 2026	BJP
Minister of Welfare of Minorities and Development	Chandra Mohan Patowary	11 May 2021	9 December 2024	BJP
Minister of Welfare of Minorities and Development	Nandita Garlosa	9 December 2024	11 May 2026	BJP
Minister of Act East Policy Affairs	Himanta Biswa Sarma	11 May 2021	9 June 2022	BJP
Minister of Act East Policy Affairs	Chandra Mohan Patowary	9 June 2022	11 May 2026	BJP
Minister of Environment and Forests	Parimal Suklabaidya	11 May 2021	9 June 2022	BJP
Minister of Environment and Forests	Chandra Mohan Patowary	9 June 2022	11 May 2026	BJP
Minister of Excise	Parimal Suklabaidya	11 May 2021	18 June 2024	BJP
Minister of Excise	Keshab Mahanta	18 June 2024	9 December 2024	AGP
Minister of Excise	Atul Bora	9 December 2024	11 May 2026	AGP
Minister of Fisheries	Parimal Suklabaidya	11 May 2021	18 June 2024	BJP
Minister of Fisheries	Keshab Mahanta	18 June 2024	9 December 2024	AGP
Minister of Fisheries	Krishnendu Paul	9 December 2024	11 May 2026	BJP
Minister of Information Technology; Minister of Science, Technology and Climate Change; (Minister of Science and Technology, until September 2021)	Keshab Mahanta	11 May 2021	11 May 2026	AGP
Minister of Health and Family Welfare	Keshab Mahanta	11 May 2021	18 June 2024	AGP
Minister of Health and Family Welfare	Himanta Biswa Sarma	18 June 2024	9 December 2024	BJP
Minister of Health and Family Welfare	Ashok Singhal	9 December 2024	11 May 2026	BJP
Minister of Medical Education and Research	Keshab Mahanta	20 May 2022	18 June 2024	AGP
Minister of Medical Education and Research	Himanta Biswa Sarma	18 June 2024	Incumbent	BJP
Minister of Medical Education and Research	Prasanta Phukan (PMABY)	9 December 2024	11 May 2026	BJP
Minister of Education (Higher, Secondary and Elementary)	Ranoj Pegu	11 May 2021	11 May 2026	BJP
Minister of Welfare of Plain Tribes and Backward Classes (non-BTC)	Ranoj Pegu	11 May 2021	7 July 2021	BJP
Minister of Welfare of Plain Tribes and Backward Classes	Ranoj Pegu	7 July 2021	9 June 2022	BJP
Minister of Tribal Welfare	Ranoj Pegu	9 June 2022	11 May 2026	BJP
Minister of Irrigation	Ashok Singhal	11 May 2021	11 May 2026	BJP
Minister of Guwahati Development; Minister of Urban Development	Ashok Singhal	11 May 2021	20 July 2021	BJP
Minister of Housing and Urban Affairs	Ashok Singhal	20 July 2021	9 December 2024	BJP
Minister of Housing and Urban Affairs	Jayanta Malla Baruah	9 December 2024	11 May 2026	BJP
Minister of Revenue and Disaster Management	Jogen Mohan	11 May 2021	9 December 2024	BJP
Minister of Revenue and Disaster Management	Keshab Mahanta	9 December 2024	11 May 2026	AGP
Minister of Hill Areas Development	Jogen Mohan	11 May 2021	11 May 2026	BJP
Minister of Mines and Minerals	Jogen Mohan	11 May 2021	9 June 2022	BJP
Minister of Mines and Minerals	Nandita Garlosa	9 June 2022	29 May 2023	BJP
Minister of Mines and Minerals	Jogen Mohan	29 May 2023	9 December 2024	BJP
Minister of Mines and Minerals	Kaushik Rai	9 December 2024	11 May 2026	BJP
Minister of Welfare of Tea Tribes and Adivasi; Minister of Labour and Welfare	Sanjoy Kishan	11 May 2021	7 December 2024	BJP
Minister of Welfare of Tea Tribes and Adivasi; Minister of Labour and Welfare	Rupesh Gowala	9 December 2024	11 May 2026	BJP
Minister of Finance	Ajanta Neog	11 May 2021	11 May 2026	BJP
Minister of Social Welfare	Ajanta Neog	11 May 2021	9 June 2022	BJP
Minister of Women and Child Development	Ajanta Neog	9 June 2022	11 May 2026	BJP
Minister of Water Resources; Minister of Information and Public Relations and Printing and Stationery	Pijush Hazarika	11 May 2021	11 May 2026	BJP
Minister of Parliamentary Affairs	Pijush Hazarika	11 May 2021	9 December 2024	BJP
Minister of Parliamentary Affairs	Chandra Mohan Patowary	9 December 2024	11 May 2026	BJP
Minister of Social Justice and Empowerment	Pijush Hazarika	9 June 2022	11 May 2026	BJP
Minister of Cultural Affairs	Bimal Bora	11 May 2021	11 May 2026	BJP
Minister of Power	Bimal Bora	11 May 2021	9 June 2022	BJP
Minister of Power	Nandita Garlosa	9 June 2022	9 December 2024	BJP
Minister of Power	Prasanta Phukan	9 December 2024	11 May 2026	BJP
Minister of Sports and Youth Welfare	Bimal Bora	11 May 2021	29 May 2023	BJP
Minister of Sports and Youth Welfare	Nandita Garlosa	29 May 2023	11 May 2026	BJP
Minister of Tourism	Bimal Bora	11 May 2021	9 June 2022	BJP
Minister of Tourism	Jayanta Malla Baruah	9 June 2022	9 December 2024	BJP
Minister of Tourism	Ranjeet Kumar Dass	9 December 2024	11 May 2026	BJP
Minister of Indigenous and Tribal Faith and Culture	Ranoj Pegu (Library and Museum)	9 June 2022	9 December 2024	BJP
Minister of Indigenous and Tribal Faith and Culture	Nandita Garlosa (Archaeology)	9 June 2022	9 December 2024	BJP
Minister of Indigenous and Tribal Faith and Culture	Himanta Biswa Sarma (excluding Library and Museum, and Archaeology)	9 June 2022	9 December 2024	BJP
Minister of Indigenous and Tribal Faith and Culture	Jogen Mohan	9 December 2024	11 May 2026	BJP
Minister of Public Works Buildings and National Highways	Nandita Garlosa	9 December 2024	18 October 2025	BJP
Minister of Public Works Buildings and National Highways	Jogen Mohan	18 October 2025	11 May 2026	BJP
Minister of Public Works Roads	Krishnendu Paul	9 December 2024	11 May 2026	BJP
Minister of Barak Valley Development	Kaushik Rai	9 December 2024	11 May 2026	BJP
Minister of Home (Prisons, Home Guards and Civil Defense)	Rupesh Gowala	9 December 2024	11 May 2026	BJP

== Guardian Ministers ==
Guardian minister of Assam is a cabinet-level minister in India appointed by a state government (Government of Assam) to oversee the development of a specific district within the state. In Assam state, the Himanta Biswa Sarma government has 14 guardian ministers, including the Chief Minister. The maximum number of ministers that the government can appoint is 19.

District	Minister	Took office	Left office	Party
Sonitpur, Hojai, Udalguri	Pijush Hazarika		Incumbent	BJP
	Ranjeet Kumar Dass		Incumbent	
	Atul Bora		Incumbent	
	Bimal Bora		Incumbent	
			Incumbent	

== Demographics ==
Region			
Region	Bharatiya Janata Party	Asom Gana Parishad	United People's Party, Liberal
North Assam Division	2(Ashok Singhal, Ranoj Pegu)		
Upper Assam division	5(Prasanta Phukan, Rupesh Gowala, Jogen Mohan, Bimal Bora, Sanjoy Kishan)		
Lower Assam division	3(Urkhao Gwra Brahma, Himanta Biswa Sarma, Chandra Mohan Patowary, Pijush Hazarika		
Central Assam division	1(Nandita Garlosa)		
Barak Valley	3(Krishnendu Paul, Parimal Suklabaidya, Kaushik Rai)		
Total			
