= Assam State Transport Corporation =

Indian public transport bus service

- Formerly: Road Transport, Assam (1948–1970)
- Type: Public Sector
- Industry: Public transport bus service
- Founded: 1970
- Headquarters: Assam State Transport Corporation Headquarters, Rupnagar, Guwahati, India
- Area served: Assam and adjoining states
- Key people: Charan Boro, Minister for Transport, Government of Assam; Vacant (Chairperson); Chinmoy Prakash Phookan, ACS (Managing Director)
- Services: Public transport
- Owner: Government of Assam
- Parent: Transport Department, Government of Assam
- Divisions: 10
- Subsidiaries: Assam State Urban Transport Corporation
- Website: astc.assam.gov.in

Assam State Transport Corporation (ASTC) is a state government owned road transport corporation of Assam, India which provides bus services within Assam and adjoining states. Assam State Transport was started as a state government department with only two buses to run between Guwahati and Nagaon. Gradually the transport network of the department expanded throughout the state of Assam. At present, ASTC has 10 divisions, 135 bus stations, more than 1100 fleets and 3 Inter State Bus Terminals (Guwahati, Jorhat and Silchar) across the state.

== History ==
Assam State Transport Corporation was a wing of transport department of Government of Assam before it was a corporation. It was formed as "Road Transport, Assam" under Home Department on 16 January 1948. Assam State Transport was started as a state government department with two buses to run between Guwahati and Nagaon. The state transport department was converted to a Corporation under Road Transport Corporation Act 1950 on 31 March 1970.

The state has a target to convert all its bus fleets to electric bus by 2030, and starting 2025 will purchase only electric buses. On 1 January 2024, ASTC launched 200 AC electric buses for Guwahati and its adjoining areas.

Five charging stations are currently being established at strategic locations including Jagiroad, Baihata Chariali, Mirza, ASTC's Rupnagar campus, and the ISBT in the Lokhra area of Guwahati. The Rupnagar station, featuring 16 charging points, has been completed and is operational.

== List of Chairpersons ==
List of Chairpersons of Assam State Transport Corporation
Nos.	Name	Portrait	Transport Minister	Appointment date	Retirement date
1.	?		Chandan Brahma	2006	2011
2.	?		Chandan Brahma	2011	2016
2.	?		Tarun Gogoi	2011	2016
2.	?		Ajit Singh	2011	2016
3.	?		Chandra Mohan Patowary	2016	2018
4.	Ashok Kumar Bhattarai		Chandra Mohan Patowary	2018	2021
5.	Mission Ranjan Das		Chandra Mohan Patowary	8 December 2021	7 September 2024
5.	Mission Ranjan Das		Parimal Suklabaidya	8 December 2021	7 September 2024
5.	Mission Ranjan Das		Keshab Mahanta	8 December 2021	7 September 2024
6.	Pallab Lochan Das		Keshab Mahanta	1 October 2024	Incumbent
7.	Vacant		Charan Boro	18 October 2025	

== Services ==
ASTC is the lifeline of road transport connectivity of the state as it operates buses on highways, city roads and even in the remote rural areas. It operates a fleet of 585 buses including Hi-Tech Luxury (AC/Non AC) buses for long distances and Hi-Tech semi and mini deluxe bus services for city and rural areas. The subsidiary Assam State Urban Transport Corporation operates the city bus services within Guwahati city. There are also many private buses operating under ASTC. Apart from that the corporation also partnered with some private Volvo bus operators to operate in Public Private Partnership (PPP) mode.

=== Types of services ===
General services

- AC Hi-Tech Luxury Coach
- Non AC Hi-Tech Luxury Coach
- AC Bharat Benz Coach
- Semi Deluxe Coach
- Tata Marcopolo City Service
- Volvo 8400 B7R LE Coach
- Tata/Olectra AC Electric bus service

Premium services

- Volvo 9400 B8R and B11R Semi-Sleeper Coach fleets operated through PPP mode.

ASTC City Cabs service

- The city cab service was introduced for Guwahati.

== ASTC Uberization ==
Uberization scheme was introduced by ASTC on 11 August 2020 to operate private buses for a minimum period of 5 years under ASTC.

== Divisions ==
ASTC has 10 divisions across the state. These are - Tinsukia Division, Nagaon Division, Silchar Division, Jorhat Division, Sivasagar Division, Bongaigaon Division, Lakhimpur Division, Tezpur Division, Greater Guwahati Region City Service Division and ISBT-Guwahati Division.

== Contribution ==
ASTC donated bus for the cancer patients of Assam. They had donated 20 BharatBenz buses to shift cancer patients from Assam to Tata Memorial Hospital, Mumbai.
