= Sonowal ministry =

Government of Assam, India from 2016 to 2021

- 22nd Ministry of Assam
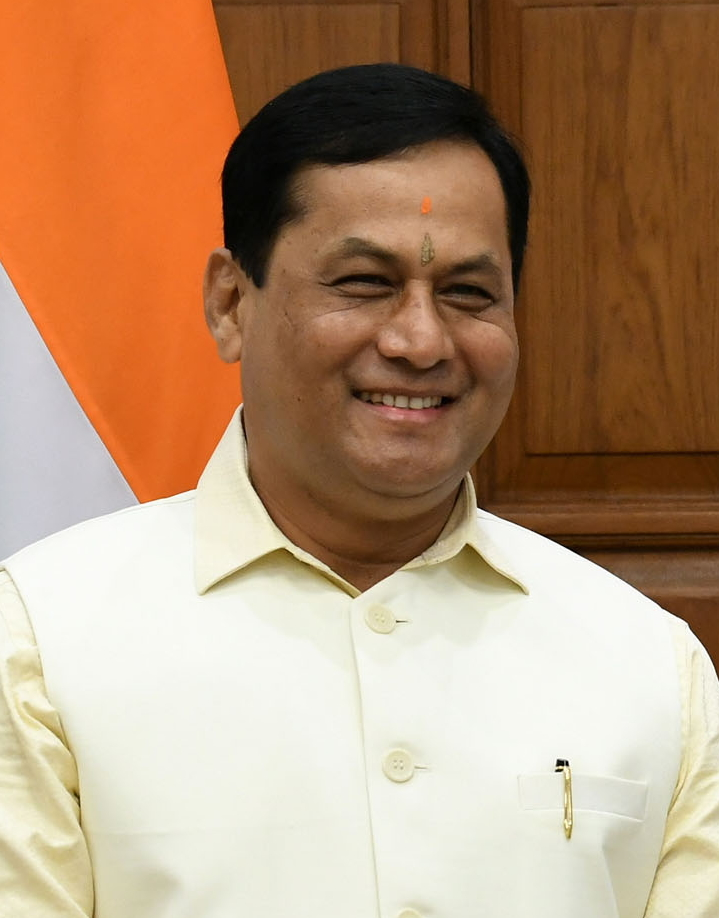
- Sarbananda Sonowal, Hon'ble Chief Minister of Assam
- Date formed: 24 May 2016
- Date dissolved: 10 May 2021

People and organisations
- Head of state: Padmanabha Acharya (until 17 August 2016); Banwarilal Purohit (22 August 2016 till 29 September 2017); Jagdish Mukhi (from 10 October 2017)
- Head of government: Sarbananda Sonowal
- Member parties: National Democratic Alliance: Bharatiya Janata Party; Asom Gana Parishad; Bodoland People's Front
- Status in legislature: Coalition
- Opposition party: Indian National Congress
- Opposition leader: Debabrata Saikia

History
- Election: 2016
- Outgoing election: 2021
- Legislature term: 5 years
- Predecessor: Third Tarun Gogoi ministry
- Successor: First Sarma ministry

The Sonowal ministry was the state ministry of Assam headed by Chief Minister Sarbananda Sonowal from 2016 till 2021. The ministry was formed on 24 May 2016 on the aftermath of the 2016 legislative assembly election which resulted in the Bharatiya Janata Party emerging as the majority party.

== Composition ==
At the time of its formation in May 2016, the cabinet consisted of chief minister Sarbananda Sonowal, eight ministers of cabinet rank and two ministers of state (independent charge). The cabinet ministers were Himanta Biswa Sarma, Parimal Suklabaidya, Chandra Mohan Patowary and Ranjit Dutta (all from Bharatiya Janata Party), Pramila Rani Brahma and Rihon Daimary (both from Bodoland People's Front) and Atul Bora and Keshab Mahanta (from the Asom Gana Parishad). The ministers of state were Naba Kumar Doley and Pallab Lochan Das, both from BJP.

The ministry was expanded on 26 April 2018 with the induction of three cabinet ministers - Siddhartha Bhattacharya and Sum Ronghang (BJP), Phani Bhusan Choudhury (AGP) and Chandan Brahma (BPF). Three BJP MLAs were inducted as ministers of state (independent charge), namely Bhabesh Kalita, Pijush Hazarika and Topon Kumar Gogoi. Two ministers of state Pallab Lochan Das and Topon Kumar Gogoi were elected to the 17th Lok Sabha and resigned from their positions on 4 June 2019.

The cabinet was expanded on 18 January 2020 with the induction of two BJP MLAs Jogen Mohan and Sanjoy Kishan as ministers of state (independent charge). Cabinet Minister Chandan Brahma resigned from the cabinet on 7 March 2021 after joining the Indian National Congress prior to the election.

== Council of Ministers ==
=== Cabinet Ministers ===
Portfolio	Minister	Took office	Left office	Party
Chief Minister and also in-charge of: Department of Home; Department of Political; Department of Personnel; General Administration Development; Secretariat Administration Development; Department of Administrative Reforms and Training; Department of Election; Department of Information and Public Relations; Department of Border Area Development; Department of Implementation of Assam Accord	Sarbananda Sonowal	24 May 2016	10 May 2021	BJP
Minister of Finance; Minister of Health and Family Welfare	Himanta Biswa Sarma	25 May 2016	10 May 2021	BJP
Minister of Planning and Development	Himanta Biswa Sarma	25 May 2016	26 April 2018	BJP
Minister of Transformation and Development	Himanta Biswa Sarma	26 April 2018	10 May 2021	BJP
Minister of Education (Higher, Secondary and Elementary)	Himanta Biswa Sarma	25 May 2016	26 April 2018	BJP
Minister of Education (Higher, Secondary and Elementary)	Siddhartha Bhattacharya	26 April 2018	18 January 2020	BJP
Minister of Education (Higher, Secondary and Elementary)	Himanta Biswa Sarma	18 January 2020	10 May 2021	BJP
Minister of Agriculture, Horticulture and Food Processing; Minister of Animal Husbandry and Veterinary	Atul Bora	25 May 2016	10 May 2021	AGP
Minister of Environment and Forests	Pramila Rani Brahma	25 May 2016	26 April 2018	BPF
Minister of Environment and Forests	Parimal Suklabaidya	26 April 2018	10 May 2021	BJP
Minister of Soil Conservation	Pramila Rani Brahma	25 May 2016	10 May 2021	BPF
Minister of Welfare of Plain Tribes and Backward Classes	Pramila Rani Brahma	25 May 2016	26 April 2018	BPF
Minister of Welfare of Plain Tribes and Backward Classes	Chandan Brahma	26 April 2018	10 May 2021	BPF
Minister of Mines and Minerals	Pramila Rani Brahma	25 May 2016	26 April 2018	BPF
Minister of Mines and Minerals	Sum Ronghang	26 April 2018	7 March 2021	BJP
Minister of Water Resources; Minister of Science and Technology; Minister of Information Technology	Keshab Mahanta	25 May 2016	10 May 2021	AGP
Minister of Public Works Department	Parimal Suklabaidya	25 May 2016	26 April 2018	BJP
Minister of Public Works Department	Himanta Biswa Sarma	26 April 2018	10 May 2021	BJP
Minister of Fisheries; Minister of Excise	Parimal Suklabaidya	25 May 2016	10 May 2021	BJP
Minister of Irrigation	Ranjit Dutta	25 May 2016	26 April 2018	BJP
Minister of Irrigation	Bhabesh Kalita, MoS (I/C)	26 April 2018	10 May 2021	BJP
Minister of Handloom, Textiles and Sericulture	Himanta Biswa Sarma (Khadi and Village Industries)	25 May 2016	26 April 2018	BJP
Minister of Handloom, Textiles and Sericulture	Ranjit Dutta (excluding Khadi and Village Industries)	25 May 2016	26 April 2018	BJP
Minister of Handloom, Textiles and Sericulture	Ranjit Dutta	26 April 2018	10 May 2021	BJP
Minister of Welfare of Minorities	Sarbananda Sonowal	25 May 2016	26 April 2018	BJP
Minister of Welfare of Minorities	Ranjit Dutta	26 April 2018	10 May 2021	BJP
Minister of Transport; Minister of Commerce and Industry; Minister of Parliamentary Affairs	Chandra Mohan Patowary	25 May 2016	10 May 2021	BJP
Minister of Skill Entrepreneurship and Employment	Chandra Mohan Patowary	25 May 2016	25 October 2016	BJP
Minister of Skill, Employment and Entrepreneurship Development	Chandra Mohan Patowary	25 October 2016	10 May 2021	BJP
Minister of Act East Policy Affairs	Chandra Mohan Patowary	28 July 2017	10 May 2021	BJP
Minister of Public Health Engineering	Rihon Daimary	25 May 2016	10 May 2021	BPF
Minister of Food; Minister of Civil Supplies and Consumer Affairs	Rihon Daimary	25 May 2016	26 April 2018	BPF
Minister of Food; Minister of Civil Supplies and Consumer Affairs	Phani Bhusan Choudhury	26 April 2018	10 May 2021	AGP
Minister of Judicial, Legislative and Law	Sarbananda Sonowal	25 May 2016	26 April 2018	BJP
Minister of Law and Justice	Siddhartha Bhattacharya	26 April 2018	10 May 2021	BJP
Minister of Social Welfare	Sarbananda Sonowal	25 May 2016	26 April 2018	BJP
Minister of Social Welfare	Pramila Rani Brahma	26 April 2018	10 May 2021	BPF
Minister of Hill Areas Development	Sarbananda Sonowal	25 May 2016	26 April 2018	BJP
Minister of Hill Areas Development	Sum Ronghang	26 April 2018	7 March 2021	BJP
Minister of Tourism	Himanta Biswa Sarma	25 May 2016	26 April 2018	BJP
Minister of Tourism	Chandan Brahma	26 April 2018	10 May 2021	BPF
Minister of Guwahati Development Department	Himanta Biswa Sarma	25 May 2016	26 April 2018	BJP
Minister of Guwahati Development Department	Siddhartha Bhattacharya	26 April 2018	10 May 2021	BJP
Minister of Co-operation	Himanta Biswa Sarma	25 May 2016	26 April 2018	BJP
Minister of Co-operation	Rihon Daimary	26 April 2018	18 January 2020	BPF
Minister of Co-operation	Siddhartha Bhattacharya	18 January 2020	10 May 2021	BJP
Minister of Pension and Public Grievances	Himanta Biswa Sarma	25 May 2016	26 April 2018	BJP
Minister of Pension and Public Grievances	Phani Bhusan Choudhury	26 April 2018	10 May 2021	AGP
Minister of Revenue and Disaster Management	Sarbananda Sonowal	25 May 2016	18 January 2020	BJP
Minister of Revenue and Disaster Management	Jogen Mohan, MoS (I/C)	18 January 2020	10 May 2021	BJP
Minister of Power	Sarbananda Sonowal	25 May 2016	26 April 2018	BJP
Minister of Power	Topon Kumar Gogoi, MoS (I/C)	26 April 2018	4 June 2019	BJP
Minister of Power	Sarbananda Sonowal	4 June 2019	10 May 2021	BJP
Minister of Urban Development	Atul Bora	25 May 2016	26 April 2018	BJP
Minister of Urban Development	Pijush Hazarika, MoS (I/C)	18 January 2020	10 May 2021	BJP
Minister of Town and Country Planning	Atul Bora	25 May 2016	18 January 2020	BJP
Minister of Town and Country Planning	Pijush Hazarika, MoS (I/C)	18 January 2020	10 May 2021	BJP
Minister of Tea Tribes Welfare	Pallab Lochan Das, MoS (I/C)	25 May 2016	4 June 2019	BJP
Minister of Tea Tribes Welfare	Sarbananda Sonowal	4 June 2019	18 January 2020	BJP
Minister of Tea Tribes Welfare	Sanjoy Kishan, MoS (I/C)	18 January 2020	10 May 2021	BJP
Minister of Labour and Employment	Pallab Lochan Das, MoS (I/C)	25 May 2016	25 October 2016	BJP
Minister of Labour Welfare	Pallab Lochan Das, MoS (I/C)	25 October 2016	4 June 2019	BJP
Minister of Labour Welfare	Sarbananda Sonowal	4 June 2019	10 May 2021	BJP
Minister of Sports and Youth Welfare	Naba Kumar Doley, MoS (I/C)	25 May 2016	26 April 2018	BJP
Minister of Sports and Youth Welfare	Sarbananda Sonowal	26 April 2018	10 May 2021	BJP
Minister of Cultural Affairs	Naba Kumar Doley, MoS (I/C)	25 May 2016	26 April 2018	BJP
Minister of Cultural Affairs	Naba Kumar Doley, MoS (I/C) (excluding Library and Archaeology)	26 April 2018	10 May 2021	BJP
Minister of Cultural Affairs	Keshab Mahanta (Library and Archaeology)	26 April 2018	10 May 2021	AGP
Minister of Public Enterprises	Rihon Daimary	18 January 2020	10 May 2021	BPF

=== Minister of State (Independent Charge) ===
Portfolio	Minister	Took office	Left office	Party
Minister of State (Independent Charge) for Panchayat and Rural Development	Naba Kumar Doley	24 May 2016	10 May 2021	BJP

=== Minister of State ===
Portfolio	Minister	Took office	Left office	Party
Minister of State in the Department of Social Welfare	Naba Kumar Doley	24 May 2016	26 April 2018	BJP
Minister of State in the Department of Power	Pallab Lochan Das	24 May 2016	26 April 2018	BJP
Minister of State in the Department of Revenue and Disaster Management	Pallab Lochan Das	24 May 2016	26 April 2018	BJP
Minister of State in the Department of Revenue and Disaster Management	Bhabesh Kalita	26 April 2018	18 January 2020	BJP
Minister of State in the Department of Environment and Forests	Naba Kumar Doley	26 April 2018	10 May 2021	BJP
Minister of State in the Department of Education	Pallab Lochan Das	26 April 2018	4 June 2019	BJP
Minister of State in the Department of Education	Bhabesh Kalita	18 January 2020	10 May 2021	BJP
Minister of State in the Department of Public Works	Topon Kumar Gogoi	26 April 2018	4 June 2019	BJP
Minister of State in the Department of Public Works	Jogen Mohan	18 January 2020	10 May 2021	BJP
Minister of State in the Department of Health and Family Welfare	Topon Kumar Gogoi	26 April 2018	10 May 2021	BJP
Minister of State in the Department of Labour Welfare	Sanjoy Kishan	18 January 2020	10 May 2021	BJP
