= Sarma ministry =

Sarma ministry could refer to:

- First Sarma ministry, from 2021 to 2026
- Second Sarma ministry, from 2026
