= Kaziranga Lok Sabha constituency =

Coordinates: 26.15°N 92.63°E

Kaziranga AS-10
- Lok Sabha constituency
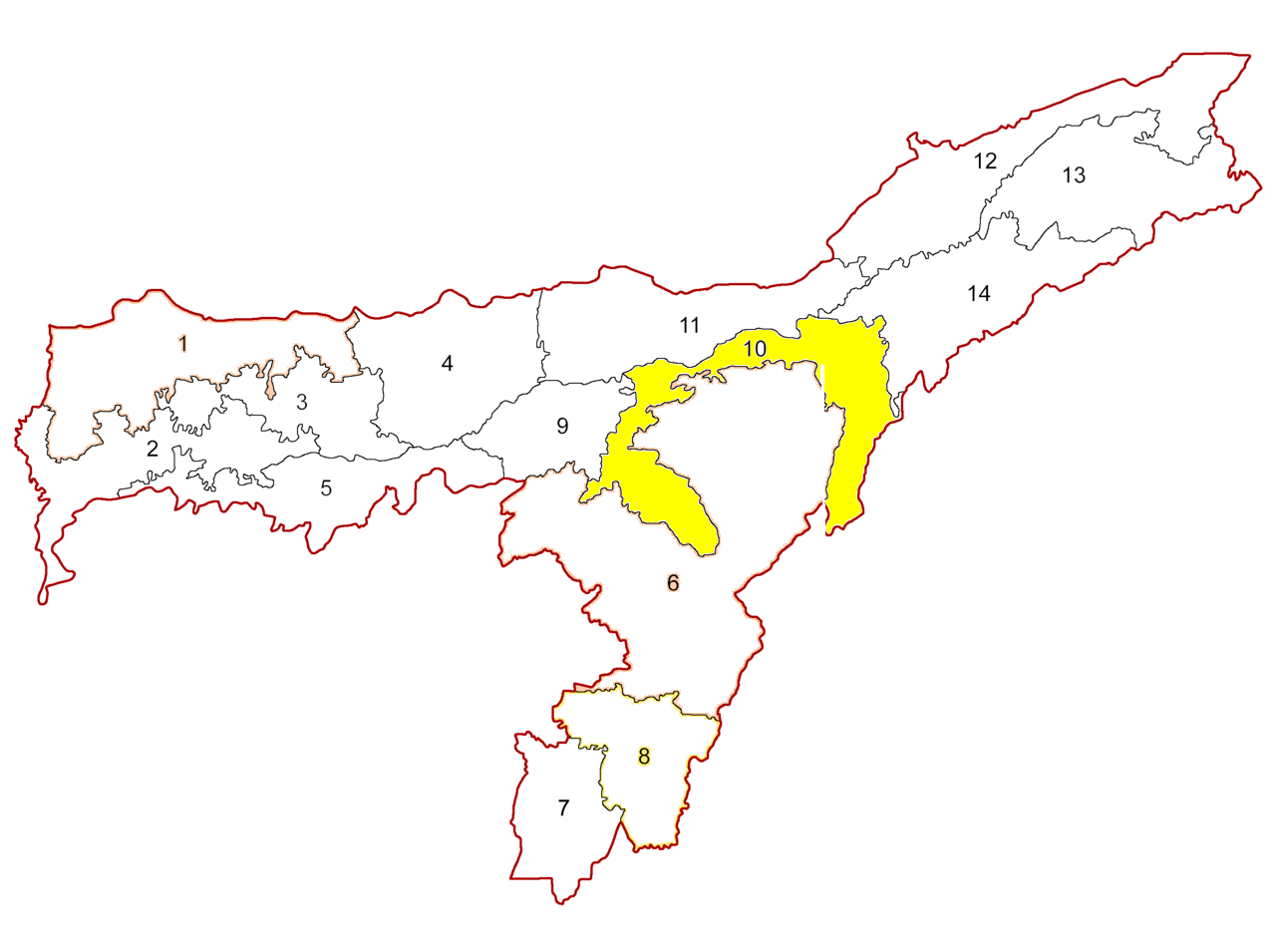
- Kaziranga Lok Sabha constituency

Constituency details
- Country: India
- Region: Northeast India
- State: Assam
- Established: 2023
- Reservation: None

Member of Parliament
- 18th Lok Sabha
- Incumbent Kamakhya Prasad Tasa
- Party: BJP
- Alliance: NDA
- Elected year: 2024

Kaziranga Lok Sabha constituency is one of the 14 Lok Sabha constituencies in Assam state in north-eastern India.

== Assembly segments ==
Kaziranga Lok Sabha constituency is composed of the following assembly segments:

=== Current assembly segments ===
| No. | Name | Reserved for (SC/ST/None) | District | Member | Party | 2024 Lead |
|---|---|---|---|---|---|---|
| 57 | Kaliabor | None | Nagaon | Keshab Mahanta | AGP | BJP |
| 59 | Barhampur | None | Nagaon | Jitu Goswami | BJP | BJP |
| 62 | Binnakandi | None | Hojai | Badruddin Ajmal | AIUDF | INC |
| 63 | Hojai | None | Hojai | Shiladitya Dev | BJP | BJP |
| 64 | Lumding | None | Hojai | Sibu Misra | BJP | BJP |
| 103 | Golaghat | None | Golaghat | Ajanta Neog | BJP | BJP |
| 104 | Dergaon | None | Golaghat | Mridul Kumar Dutta | BJP | BJP |
| 105 | Bokakhat | None | Golaghat | Atul Bora | AGP | BJP |
| 106 | Khumtai | None | Golaghat | Mrinal Saikia | BJP | BJP |
| 107 | Sarupathar | None | Golaghat | Biswajit Phukan | BJP | BJP |

== Members of Parliament ==
| Election | Portrait | Name | Party |
|---|---|---|---|
| 2024 | | Kamakhya Prasad Tasa | Bharatiya Janata Party |

== Election results ==
=== 2024 ===
2024 Indian general election: Kaziranga
| Party | Candidate | Votes | % | ±% |
|---|---|---|---|---|
| BJP | Kamakhya Prasad Tasa | 897,043 | 55.04 | |
| INC | Roselina Tirkey | 6,48,096 | 39.76 | |
| NOTA | None of the above | 24,431 | 1.50 | |
| Majority | | 2,48,947 | 15.28 | |
| Turnout | | 16,35,636 | 79.64 | |
| BJP win (new seat) | | | | |

== See also ==
- List of constituencies of the Lok Sabha
