= Kishan (surname) =

Kishan (Hindi: किशन, Telugu: కిషన్) is a surname. Notable people with the surname include:

- Gouri G. Kishan (1999), actress from Kerala
- Ishan Kishan (1998), Indian international cricketer
- Ravi Kishan (1969), Indian actor, politician, film producer and television personality
- Sanjoy Kishan (born 1970), Bharatiya Janata Party politician
- Sundeep Kishan (born 1987), Indian actor and producer
- Vinoth Kishan (born 1989), Indian actor
