= Bimal Bora =

Indian politician

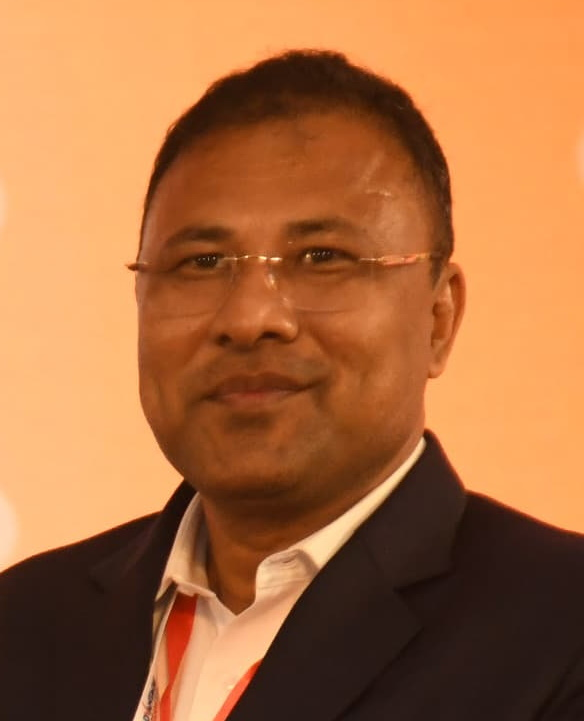
- Bora in 2025

Cabinet Minister, Assam
- Incumbent
- Assumed office 10 May 2021
- Chief Minister: Himanta Biswa Sarma
- Departments: Cultural Affairs; Power, Tourism (2021–22); Sports and Youth Welfare (2021–23); Public Enterprises (2022–present); Industries and Commerce (2024–present)
- Preceded by: Naba Kumar Doley (Culture); Sarbananda Sonowal (Power, Sports); Chandan Brahma (Tourism); Chandra Mohan Patowary (Public Enterprises); Jayanta Malla Baruah (Industries)
- Succeeded by: Nandita Garlosa (Power, Sports); Jayanta Malla Baruah (Tourism)

Member, Assam Legislative Assembly
- Incumbent
- Assumed office 19 May 2016
- Preceded by: Atuwa Munda
- Constituency: Tingkhong

Personal details
- Party: Bharatiya Janata Party
- Parent: Hari Bora

Bimal Bora is a Bharatiya Janata Party politician from the Indian state of Assam. He was elected in the Assam Legislative Assembly election in 2016 and 2021 from Tingkhong constituency. He took oath as a cabinet Minister of the Government of Assam on 10 May 2021.
