= Bokakhat Assembly constituency =

Constituency of the Assam legislative assembly in India

Bokakhat
- Constituency No. 105 for the Assam Legislative Assembly

Constituency details
- Country: India
- Region: Northeast India
- State: Assam
- District: Golaghat
- Lok Sabha constituency: Kaziranga
- Established: 1962
- Reservation: None

Member of Legislative Assembly
- 16th Assam Legislative Assembly
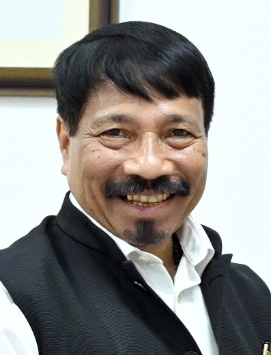
- Incumbent Atul Bora
- Party: AGP
- Alliance: NDA
- Elected year: 2026

Bokakhat Assembly constituency is one of the 126 assembly constituencies of Assam Legislative Assembly. Bokakhat forms part of the Kaziranga Lok Sabha constituency.

== Town Details ==
Following are details on Bokakhat Assembly constituency-

- Country: India.
- State: Assam.
- District: Golaghat district .
- Lok Sabha Constituency: Kaliabor Lok Sabha/Parliamentary constituency..
- Assembly Categorisation: Rural
- Literacy Level: 91.27%.
- Eligible Electors as per 2021 General Elections: 1,47,487 Eligible Electors. Male Electors:73,798 . Female Electors: 73,686 .
- Geographic Co-Ordinates: 26°44'54.2"N 93°50'06.7"E.
- Total Area Covered: 1307 square kilometres.
- Area Includes: Bokakhat thana; Mahura mouza in Golaghat thana; and Rangamati mouza in Dergaon thana in Golaghat sub-division, of Golaghat district of Assam.
- Inter State Border : Golaghat.
- Number Of Polling Stations: Year 2011-166, Year 2016-166, Year 2021-93.

== Members of Legislative Assembly ==
| Election | Member | Party affiliation |
|---|---|---|
| 1962 | Narendranath Sarma | Indian National Congress |
| 1967 | Lakheswar Das | Indian National Congress |
| 1972 | Tulsi Das | Indian National Congress |
| 1978 | Chatra Gopal Karmakar | Indian National Congress |
| 1983 | Dharmeshwar Hazarika | Indian National Congress |
| 1985 | Balobhadra Tamuly | Independent |
| 1991 | Bhupendra Nath Bhuyan | Indian National Congress |
| 1996 | Bhupendra Nath Bhuyan | Indian National Congress |
| 2001 | Jiten Gogoi | Independent |
| 2006 | Jiten Gogoi | Independent |
| 2011 | Arun Phukan | Indian National Congress |
| 2016 | Atul Bora | Asom Gana Parishad |
| 2021 | Atul Bora | Asom Gana Parishad |
| 2026 | Atul Bora | Asom Gana Parishad |

== Election results ==
=== 2026 ===
2026 Assam Legislative Assembly election: Bokakhat
| Party | Candidate | Votes | % | ±% |
|---|---|---|---|---|
| AGP | Atul Bora | 80,987 | 59.66 | |
| RD | Hari Prasad Saikia | 20450 | 15.06 | |
| Independent | PRANAB DOLEY | 14250 | 10.5 | |
| Independent | JITEN GOGOI | 13231 | 9.75 | |
| NOTA | NOTA | 2818 | 2.08 | |
| Margin of victory | | 60537 | | |
| Turnout | | 135748 | | |
| Rejected ballots | | | | |
| Registered electors | | | | |
| AGP hold | | Swing | | |

=== 2021 ===
2021 Assam Legislative Assembly election: Bokakhat
| Party | Candidate | Votes | % | ±% |
|---|---|---|---|---|
| AGP | Atul Bora | 72,930 | 60.56 | +1.02 |
| Independent | Pranab Doley | 27,749 | 23.04 | |
| Independent | Jiten Gogoi | 5,550 | 4.61 | |
| NOTA | None of the above | 2,482 | 2.06 | |
| Majority | | 45,181 | 30.55 | |
| Turnout | | 1,20,427 | 81.45 | −4.49 |
| Registered electors | | 1,47,846 | | |
| AGP hold | | Swing | +1.02 | |

=== 2016 ===
2016 Assam Legislative Assembly election: Bokakhat
| Party | Candidate | Votes | % | ±% |
|---|---|---|---|---|
| AGP | Atul Bora | 62,962 | 59.54 | |
| INC | Arun Phukan | 22,769 | 21.53 | |
| Independent | Anima Gogoi | 11,872 | 11.22 | N/A |
| NOTA | None of the above | 2,181 | 2.06 | N/A |
| Majority | | 40,193 | 38.01 | |
| Turnout | | 1,05 737 | 85.94 | |
| Registered electors | | 1,23,027 | | |
| AGP gain from INC | | Swing | | |
