= Atul Bora (AGP politician) =

Indian politician

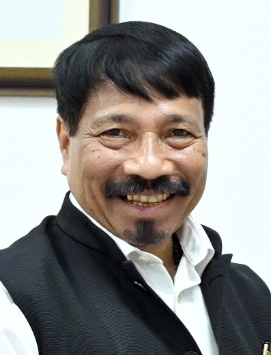
- Bora in 2025

Cabinet Minister, Assam
- Incumbent
- Assumed office 12 May 2026
- Chief Minister: Himanta Biswa Sarma
- Departments: Panchayat and Rural Development; Implementation of Assam Accord; Border Protection and Development; Excise
- Preceded by: Ranjeet Kumar Dass (Panchayat); Self (Assam Accord, Border, Excise)
- In office 11 May 2021 – 11 May 2026
- Chief Minister: Himanta Biswa Sarma
- Departments: Agriculture and Horticulture; Border Protection and Development; Implementation of Assam Accord; Co-operation (2021–2022); Animal Husbandry and Veterinary (2021–2024); Excise (2024–2026)
- Succeeded by: Himanta Biswa Sarma (Agriculture); Self (Border, Assam Accord, Excise); Nandita Garlosa (Co-operation); Krishnendu Paul (Animal Husbandry)
- In office 24 May 2016 – 10 May 2021
- Chief Minister: Sarbananda Sonowal
- Departments: Agriculture and Horticulture; Animal Husbandry and Veterinary; Urban Development (2016–2020); Town and Country Planning (2018–2020)
- Preceded by: Rakibul Hussain (Agriculture); Khorsing Engti (Animal Husbandry); Sumitra Patir (Urban Development, Town Planning)

President of the Asom Gana Parishad
- Incumbent
- Assumed office 15 July 2014
- Working President: Keshab Mahanta
- Preceded by: Prafulla Kumar Mahanta

Member, Assam Legislative Assembly
- Incumbent
- Assumed office 19 May 2016
- Preceded by: Arun Phukan
- Constituency: Bokakhat
- In office 10 May 1996 – 14 May 2001
- Preceded by: Nagen Neog
- Succeeded by: Ajanta Neog
- Constituency: Golaghat

Personal details
- Born: 7 April 1960 (age 66) Borahi Gaon, Golaghat, Assam, India
- Party: Asom Gana Parishad
- Spouse: Bulbuli Baruah
- Education: Gauhati University
- Occupation: Politician
- Website: atulbora.com

Atul Bora (born 7 April 1960) is an Indian politician from Assam affiliated with Asom Gana Parishad. He represented the Golaghat constituency from 1996 to 2001, and has been representing the Bokakhat constituency in the Assam Legislative Assembly since 2016. He was the Minister of Agriculture, Horticulture and Food Processing, Animal Husbandry and Veterinary, Urban Development, Town and Country Planning since 2016 in the Sonowal ministry and the Sarma ministry. He also served as the 2nd president of the Asom Gana Parishad since 2014 and working president of the party from 2011 to 2014.

== Early career ==
Bora was born into a family of Chutia ethnicity at Borahi Gaon, Athgaon Mouza, of Golaghat District. He is the eldest son of Sri Mehuram Bora and Smti. Punya Probha Bora. He completed his primary education at Saraimoria LP School and Torfat ME school.

Thereafter he was admitted to Kacharihat High School, where he passed the HSLC Examination. Subsequently, he took admission in Debraj Roy College, Golaghat and after graduation, he joined Gauhati University and obtained his master's degree in Political Science. He also obtained an LLB Degree from Gauhati University Law College.

== Political career ==
Bora participated actively in the Assam Movement while he was a student. He was elected Organizing Secretary and thereafter the General Secretary of the All Assam Students Union. He was also President of the All Assam Students Union.

Bora also became the Founder Chairman of the North-East Students' Co-ordination Committee, composed of student organisations of the north-eastern states. As the Founder Chairman, Bora became instrumental in organising educational, cultural, socio-political, sports and awareness programmes in entire North-East India.

Bora joined active politics by enrolling himself as an Asom Gana Parishad worker in 1995.

On 9 June 1996, he was elected as MLA from his home constituency Golaghat constituency. Bora also practised law for a few years until assuming charge of various responsible posts of the party such as District President, Joint Secretary, General Secretary of the Central Committee. In 2011 he was elected as the Working President of Asom Gana Parishad. On 15 July 2014, Bora assumed the charge of President of the party.

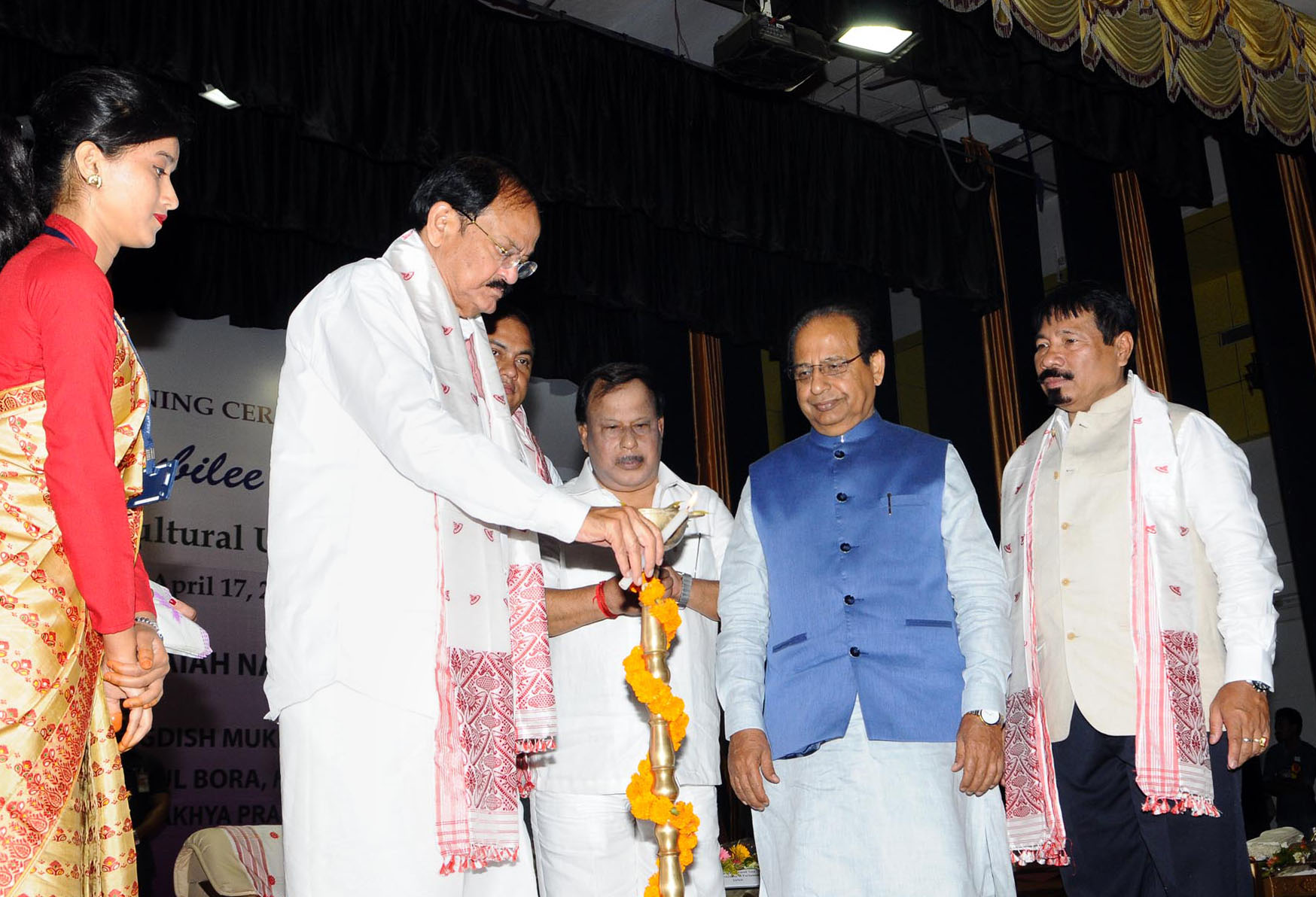
Bora with Vice President M. Venkaiah Naidu and Governor Jagadish Mukhi

In May 2016, Bora won the Bokakhat constituency. He was sworn in as Cabinet Minister on 24 May 2016 and has been allotted polities like agriculture, horticulture and food processing, animal husbandry and veterinary, urban development department, and town and country planning departments.

In January 2018, Assam Agriculture Minister Bora inaugurated a chief minister’s free diagnostic and laboratory services at the Swahid Kushal Konwar Civil Hospital here in a colourful ceremony in presence of the joint director of health services, ADC (H), superintendent of SKK civil hospital, representatives from HLL Lifecare Ltd and other dignitaries.

Atul Bora (AGP) contested & emerged victorious in the 2026 Assam Assembly Elections, securing the Bokakhat constituency seat for the third consecutive term. Bora defeated Hari Prasad Saikia of Raijor Dal by a significant margin of 60,537 votes. With a total of 80,987 votes, Bora triumphed over Saikia, who received 20,450 votes. His victory marks a continued political stronghold in Bokakhat, reflecting his enduring influence and leadership. Bora has served as a minister in both the BJP governments led by Sarbananda Sonowal and Himanta Biswa Sarma, further solidifying his prominence in Assam's political landscape.
