= Charan Boro =

Indian politician

Cabinet Minister, Government of Assam
- Incumbent
- Assumed office 18 October 2025
- Chief Minister: Himanta Biswa Sarma
- Departments: Transport; Welfare of Bodoland
- Preceded by: Jogen Mohan (Transport); Urkhao Gwra Brahma (Welfare of Bodoland)

Member, Assam Legislative Assembly
- Incumbent
- Assumed office 16 May 2016
- Preceded by: Rakheswar Brahma
- Constituency: Majbat

Personal details
- Born: 1 July 1979 (age 46)
- Party: Bodoland People's Front

Charan Boro (born 1 July 1979) is an Indian Politician currently serving as a Cabinet Minister in the Government of Assam. A member of the Bodoland People's Front (BPF), he represents the Majbat constituency in the Assam Legislative Assembly, a seat he has held since 2016.

== Early life ==
Charan Boro was born in the Rangagarah area of Udalguri district in Assam. His father's name is Nabin Boro and his mother's name is Ampuli Boro.

== Political career ==
Charan Boro is a member of the Bodoland People's Front, a regional political party dedicated to the interests of the Bodo people in Assam. He won the legislative assembly seat from Majbat constituency in 2016. His election was part of the larger political representation of Bodoland in Assam's state governance.

Charan Boro representing the Bodoland People’s Front (BPF) secured a commanding victory in the 2026 Assam Assembly elections, winning the Mazbat constituency with a significant margin of over 55,000 votes. Boro garnered 84,718 votes, easily defeating his closest competitor, Priti Rekha Barla of the Jharkhand Mukti Morcha (JMM), who polled 29,172 votes. This victory marks Boro's third consecutive win in the constituency, further solidifying his influence as a key figure in the Bodoland region. His re-election has also led to the formal return of the BPF to the National Democratic Alliance (NDA), with Assam Chief Minister Himanta Biswa Sarma calling it a "milestone for peace" in the region. Boro’s leadership and continued success have positioned him as a central figure in Assam’s political landscape.
