= Majbat Assembly constituency =

Constituency of the Assam legislative assembly in India

Majbat
- Constituency No. 47 for the Assam Legislative Assembly

Constituency details
- Country: India
- Region: Northeast India
- State: Assam
- District: Udalguri
- Lok Sabha constituency: Darrang–Udalguri
- Established: 1978
- Reservation: None

Member of Legislative Assembly
- 16th Assam Legislative Assembly
- Incumbent Charan Boro
- Party: BPF
- Alliance: NDA
- Elected year: 2026

Majbat Assembly constituency is one of 126 assembly constituencies of the Assam Legislative Assembly. Majbat is part of the Darrang–Udalguri Lok Sabha constituency.

== Members of Legislative Assembly ==
Election	Member	Party affiliation
1978	Silvius Condpan	Janata Party
1983	Silvius Condpan	Indian National Congress
1985	Silvius Condpan	Indian National Congress
1991	Silvius Condpan	Indian National Congress
1996	Silvius Condpan	Indian National Congress
2001	Karendra Basumatary	Independent
2006	Karendra Basumatary	Independent
2011	Rakheswar Brahma	Bodoland People's Front
2016	Charan Boro	Bodoland People's Front
2021	Charan Boro	Bodoland People's Front
2026	Charan Boro	Bodoland People's Front

== Election results ==
=== 2026 ===
2026 Assam Legislative Assembly election: Majbat
Party	Candidate	Votes	%	±%
BPF	Charan Boro	84,718	53.48	+10.56
JMM	Priti Rekha Barla	29,172	18.42	New
INC	Narayan Adhikari	23,558	14.87	N/A
UPPL	Rabindra Basumatary	16,903	10.67	−11.74
NOTA	NOTA	2,515	1.59	+0.18
Margin of victory		55,546	35.06	+22.39
Turnout		158,399	84.45	−2.35
Rejected ballots				
Registered electors				
BPF hold		Swing		

=== 2021 ===
2021 Assam Legislative Assembly election: Majbat
Party	Candidate	Votes	%	±%
BPF	Charan Boro	54,409	42.92	−0.99
BJP	Jitu Kissan	38,352	30.25	
UPPL	Ratendra Daimary	28,413	22.41	
Independent	Saiful Islam	1,971	1.55	
NOTA	None of the above	1,785	1.41	−0.38
Independent	Santosh Kurmi	1,247	0.98	
Independent	Sunil Sarkar	827	0.65	
Independent	Jiarul Hoque Sarkar	654	0.51	
Independent	Golam Mostafa	565	0.44	
Independent	Khurshid Alam Mazumder	333	0.26	
Majority		16,057	12.67	−11.15
Turnout		1,26,771	86.80	+3.81
Registered electors		146,049		+10.12
BPF hold		Swing		

=== 2016 ===
2016 Assam Legislative Assembly election: Majbat
Party	Candidate	Votes	%	±%
BPF	Charan Boro	48,351	43.93	
AIUDF	Teharu Gour	22,133	20.11	
INC	Raphael Kujur	20,577	18.70	
Independent	Rabindra Basumatary	8,763	7.96	
NOTA	None of the above	1,974	1.79	
Majority		26,218	23.82	
Turnout		110,058	82.99	
Registered electors		132,619		
BPF hold		Swing		

== See also ==
- List of constituencies of the Assam Legislative Assembly
- Udalguri district
