= Kaliabor Assembly constituency =

Constituency of the Assam legislative assembly in India

Kaliabor
- Constituency No. 57 for the Assam Legislative Assembly

Constituency details
- Country: India
- Region: Northeast India
- State: Assam
- District: Nagaon
- Lok Sabha constituency: Kaziranga
- Established: 1951
- Reservation: None

Member of Legislative Assembly
- 16th Assam Legislative Assembly
- Incumbent Keshab Mahanta
- Party: AGP
- Alliance: NDA
- Elected year: 2026

Kaliabor Assembly constituency is one of the 126 assembly constituencies of Assam a north east state of India. Kaliabor is also part of Kaziranga Lok Sabha constituency.

== Members of Legislative Assembly ==
Year	Member	Political party
1952	Lila Kanta Bara	Indian National Congress
1957	Lila Kanta Bara	Indian National Congress
1962	Lila Kanta Bara	Indian National Congress
1967	Atul Chandra Goswami	Samyukta Socialist Party
1972	Golap Chandra Barua	Indian National Congress
1978	Atul Chandra Goswami	Independent politician
1983	Baloram Nag	Indian National Congress
1985	Prafulla Kumar Mahanta	Independent politician
1986 (By elections)	Gunin Hazarika	Independent politician
1991	Baloram Nag	Indian National Congress
1996	Gunin Hazarika	Asom Gana Parishad
2001	Gunin Hazarika	Asom Gana Parishad
2006	Keshab Mahanta	Asom Gana Parishad
2011	Keshab Mahanta	Asom Gana Parishad
2016	Keshab Mahanta	Asom Gana Parishad
2021	Keshab Mahanta	Asom Gana Parishad
2026	Keshab Mahanta	Asom Gana Parishad

== Election results ==
=== 2026 ===
2026 Assam Legislative Assembly election: Kaliabor
Party	Candidate	Votes	%	±%
AGP	Keshab Mahanta	74,029	45.10	−13.96
Independent (BJP Rebel)	Jitendra Gour	56,139	34.20	+34.20
RD	Pradip Kumar Baruah	30,375	18.51	+18.51
NOTA	NOTA	2,040	1.24	
Independent	Jyotiska Ranjan Goswami	1,562	0.95	+0.95
Margin of victory		17,890	10.90	−12.12
Turnout		164,145	86	
Rejected ballots				
Registered electors				
AGP hold		Swing		

=== 2021 ===
Assam Legislative Assembly Election, 2021: Kaliabor
Party	Candidate	Votes	%	±%
AGP	Keshab Mahanta	73,677	59.06	
INC	Prasanta Kumar Saikia	44,957	36.04	
NOTA	None of the above			
Majority		28,720	23.02	
Turnout				
Registered electors				
AGP hold		Swing		

=== 2016 ===
2016 Assam Legislative Assembly election: Kaliabor
Party	Candidate	Votes	%	±%
AGP	Keshab Mahanta	64,759	62.02	+12.46
INC	Bindu Ganju	26,769	25.63	−13.96
AIUDF	Boloram Nag	3,682	3.52	N/A
Independent	Bijay Kumar Chamaria	2,325	2.22	N/A
CPI	Promode Bhuyan	2,063	1.97	+0.61
Independent	Jayanta Orang	1,016	0.97	N/A
LDP	Bhupen Chandra Borah	870	0.83	N/A
Independent	Bhaskar Sharma	794	0.76	N/A
BVM	Biren Mirdha	503	0.48	N/A
NOTA	None of the above	1,626	1.55	N/A
Majority		37,990	36.39	+26.42
Turnout		1,04,407	86.07	+5.18
AGP hold		Swing		

=== 2011 ===
2011 Assam Legislative Assembly election: Kaliabor
Party	Candidate	Votes	%	±%
AGP	Keshab Mahanta	44,886	49.56	+7.40
INC	Tapan Kumar Borah	35,857	39.59	+10.90
BJP	Hare Krishna Mahato	5,737	6.33	−2.68
Independent	Biren Mirdha	1,573	1.74	N/A
CPI	Promod Bhuyan	1,228	1.36	N/A
CPI(ML)L	Ditumoni Gogoi	863	0.95	N/A
NCP	Manab Jyoti Mahanta	420	0.46	N/A
Majority		8,989	9.97	−3.50
Turnout		90,564	80.89	−0.04
AGP hold		Swing		

=== 2006 ===
Assam Legislative Assembly election, 2006: Kaliabor
Party	Candidate	Votes	%	±%
AGP	Keshab Mahanta	37,031	42.16	−4.49
INC	Simanchal Digal	25,199	28.69	−17.19
AGP(P)	Gunin Hazarika	15,177	17.28	N/A
BJP	Dhrubajyoti Borgohain	7,912	9.01	N/A
JD(U)	Sabitri Boruah	2,514	2.86	N/A
Majority		11,832	13.47	+12.70
Turnout		87,833	80.93	+4.14
AGP hold		Swing		

=== 2001 ===
Assam Legislative Assembly election, 2001: Kaliabor
Party	Candidate	Votes	%	±%
AGP	Gunin Hazarika	32,293	46.65	
INC	Simanchal Digal	31,757	45.88	
Independent	Dhrubajyoti Borgohain	3,169	4.58	
Independent	Kanak Hazarika	1,879	2.71	
Independent	Bipin Mahato	119	0.17	
Majority		536	0.77	
Turnout		69,217	76.79	
AGP hold		Swing		

== See also ==
- Kaliabor
- List of constituencies of Assam Legislative Assembly
