= Sanjoy Kishan =

Indian politician

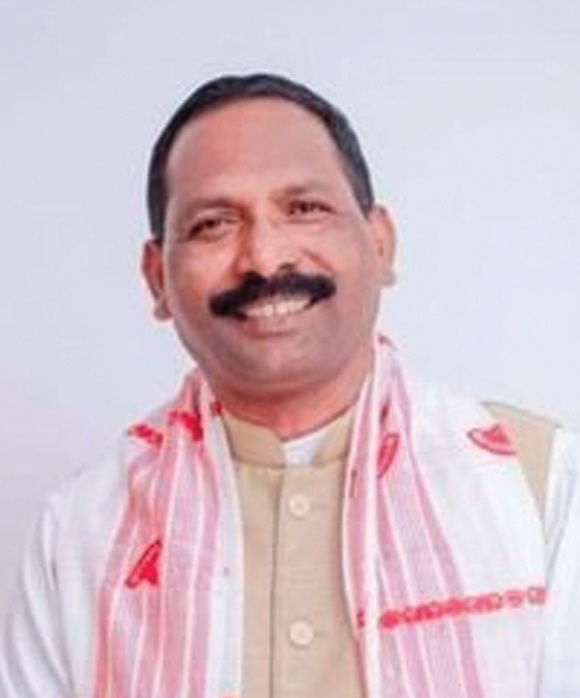

Cabinet Minister, Assam
- In office 11 May 2021 – 7 December 2024
- Chief Minister: Himanta Biswa Sarma
- Portfolios: Welfare of Tea Tribes and Adivasi; Labour and Welfare
- Succeeded by: Rupesh Gowala

Minister of State, Assam
- In office 18 January 2020 – 10 May 2021
- Chief Minister: Sarbananda Sonowal
- Portfolios: Tea Tribes Welfare (Independent charge); Labour Welfare

Member, Assam Legislative Assembly
- Incumbent
- Assumed office 19 May 2016
- Preceded by: Rajendra Prasad Singh
- Constituency: Tinsukia

Personal details
- Born: 26 January 1972 (age 54) Dhelakhat
- Party: Bharatiya Janata Party
- Spouse: Rahil Mundu Kishan (m. 2004)
- Children: 2 daughters
- Parents: Mohanlal Kishan (father); Bisoka Kishan (mother)

Sanjoy Kishan (born 26 January 1970 in Dhelakhat, Assam) is a Bharatiya Janata Party politician from Assam, India. He was elected to the Assam Legislative Assembly election in 2016, representing the Tinsukia constituency.

== Early life ==
Sanjoy Kishan was born on 26 January 1970 to the late Mohanlal Kishan and the late Bisoka Kishan in Dhelakhat. He is a Class X (matric) pass.

== Political career ==
He was elected in 2016 to the Assembly for Tinsukia. He became a minister in Sarbananda Sonowal's cabinet, and was a minister in Himanta Biswa Sarma's first cabinet.

== Personal life ==
He married Rahil Mundu Kishan on 20 July 2004. They have two daughters.
