= Kaushik Rai =

Cabinet Minister, Assam

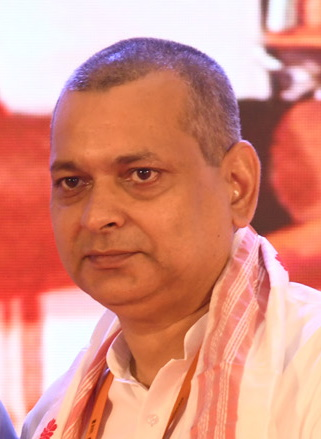
- Rai in 2025

Cabinet Minister, Government of Assam
- Incumbent
- Assumed office 7 December 2024
- Chief Minister: Himanta Biswa Sarma
- Departments: Food, Public Distribution and Consumer Affairs; Mines and Minerals; Barak Valley Development
- Preceded by: Ranjeet Kumar Dass (Food); Jogen Mohan (Mines)

Member, Assam Legislative Assembly
- Incumbent
- Assumed office 3 May 2021
- Preceded by: Rajdeep Goala
- Constituency: Lakhipur

Personal details
- Born: 20 February
- Party: Bharatiya Janata Party
- Spouse: Archana Rai
- Occupation: Politician

Kaushik Rai is an Indian politician who is a Member of the Assam Legislative Assembly, representing the BJP. He is currently serving as a minister in the Assam Cabinet. He won his seat in the 2021 elections in the Lahkipur constituency.

== Education ==
He has a B. Com degree from Gurucharan College and a Bachelor of Laws degree from A.k Chanda law college.

== Socials ==
Twitter
