= Krishnendu Paul =

Indian politician (born 1973)

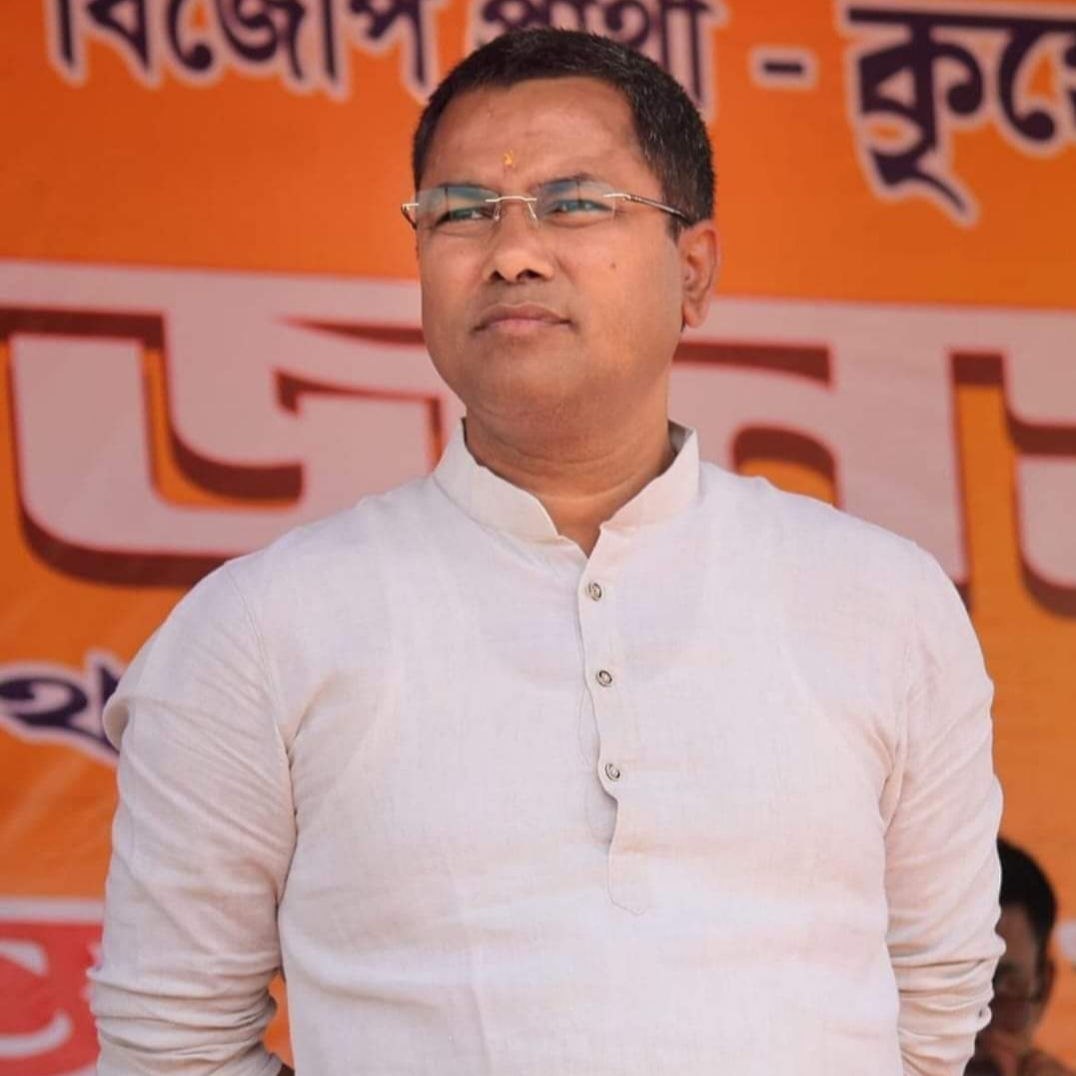
- Paul in 2026

Cabinet Minister, Government of Assam
- Incumbent
- Assumed office 9 December 2024
- Chief Minister: Himanta Biswa Sarma
- Departments: Animal Husbandry and Veterinary; Fisheries; Public Works (Roads)
- Preceded by: Atul Bora (Animal Husbandry); Keshab Mahanta (Fisheries)

Member, Assam Legislative Assembly
- Incumbent
- Assumed office 2016
- Preceded by: Monilal Gowala
- Constituency: Patharkandi

Personal details
- Born: 17 May 1973 (age 53) Karimganj, Assam, India
- Party: Bharatiya Janata Party
- Children: 2
- Education: Karimganj College

Krishnendu Paul is an Indian politician serving as a minister in the Government of Assam. He is a member of the Assam Legislative Assembly representing the Patharkandi Assembly constituency and is affiliated with the Bharatiya Janata Party (BJP). He has represented Patharkandi since 2016 and was re-elected in 2021 and 2026. Since June 2026, he has served as Assam's Minister for Public Health Engineering, Hill Areas and Barak Valley Development, and as the Guardian Minister for Cachar and Dima Hasao in the cabinet led by Chief Minister Himanta Biswa Sarma.

== Early life and education ==
Krishnendu Paul was born on 17 May 1973 in Karimganj, Assam, to Kripesh Ranjan Paul. He graduated from Karimganj College under Assam University, earning a Bachelor of Commerce degree in 1995. Prior to entering active politics, he was engaged in business.

== Political career ==
Paul joined the Bharatiya Janata Party (BJP) and was elected to the Assam Legislative Assembly from the Patharkandi constituency in the 2016 Assam Legislative Assembly election.

He was re-elected from Patharkandi in the 2021 Assam Legislative Assembly election.

In the 2026 Assam Legislative Assembly election, Paul was elected for a third consecutive term from Patharkandi. He defeated Indian National Congress candidate Kartik Sena Sinha by a margin of 46,764 votes, securing 98,101 votes against Sinha's 51,337 votes.

== Ministerial tenure ==
In December 2024, Paul was inducted into the Assam Cabinet headed by Chief Minister Himanta Biswa Sarma.

Following the cabinet expansion, he was assigned the portfolios of Animal Husbandry and Veterinary, and Fisheries.

In June 2026, following the formation of the new Assam ministry, Paul was assigned the portfolios of Public Health Engineering, Hill Areas and Barak Valley Development. He was also appointed Guardian Minister for Cachar and Dima Hasao districts.

== Legislative initiatives ==
In November 2025, Paul introduced the Prevention of Cruelty to Animals (Assam Amendment) Bill, 2025 in the Assam Legislative Assembly. The bill sought to exempt the traditional buffalo fight (Moh Juj) from the provisions of the Prevention of Cruelty to Animals Act, 1960.

== Electoral performance ==
Election	Party	Constituency	Votes	Vote %	Margin	Result
2016	Bharatiya Janata Party	Patharkandi	46,544	37.94%	9,268	Won
2021	Bharatiya Janata Party	Patharkandi	74,846	49.66%	4,467	Won
2026	Bharatiya Janata Party	Patharkandi	98,101	64.35%	46,764	Won
