= Rakheswar Brahma =

Indian politician

Rakheswar Brahma is a Bodoland People's Front politician from Assam, India. He was elected in Assam Legislative Assembly election in 2011 from Majbat constituency.
