= Jogen Mohan =

Indian politician (born 1963)

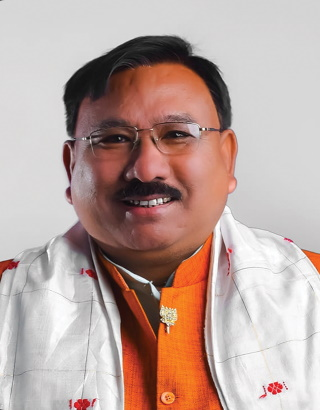
- Official portrait

Member of Parliament, Rajya Sabha
- Incumbent
- Assumed office 10 April 2026
- Preceded by: Bhubaneswar Kalita
- Constituency: Assam

Cabinet Minister, Assam
- In office 11 May 2021 – 10 April 2026
- Chief Minister: Himanta Biswa Sarma
- Departments: Hill Areas Development (2021–present); Revenue and Disaster Management (2021–24); Mines and Minerals (2021–23, 2023–24); Transport (2024–present); Indigenous and Tribal Faith and Culture (2024–present)
- Preceded by: Sum Ronghang (HAD, Mines); Self (R&DM); Keshab Mahanta (Transport)

Minister of State, Assam
- In office 18 January 2020 – 10 May 2021
- Chief Minister: Sarbananda Sonowal
- Departments: Revenue and Disaster Management (Independent charge); Public Works
- Preceded by: Sarbananda Sonowal (R&DM)

Member, Assam Legislative Assembly
- In office 19 May 2016 – 9 April 2026
- Preceded by: Sarat Saikia
- Constituency: Mahmara

Personal details
- Born: 1 November 1963 (age 62) Mahmora-Rukangaon, Assam, India
- Party: Bharatiya Janata Party
- Spouse: Alee Mohan (m. 1994)
- Children: 2
- Parents: Puneswar Mohan (father); Premoda Mohan (mother)
- Occupation: Politician

Jogen Mohan (born 1 November 1963) is an Indian politician from the state of Assam. He currently serves as a member of the Rajya Sabha from Assam. He was a member of the Assam Legislative Assembly who represented the Mahmora constituency. He had served as the Revenue & Disaster Management, Hills Area Development, Mines & Minerals minister in the Himanta Biswa Sarma led-Cabinet. Mohan was also a minister in the Sarbananda Sonowal led Government. Mohan is a resident of Jyotipur village in the Sivasagar district of Assam.
