= Gunin Hazarika =

Indian politician

Gunin Hazarika is an Asom Gana Parishad politician from Assam, India. He has been a Cabinet Minister in First Mahanta ministry & Second Mahanta ministry and was elected to the Assam Legislative Assembly in the 1986, 1996 and 2001 elections from Kaliabor constituency.
