= Chandra Mohan Patowary =

Indian politician

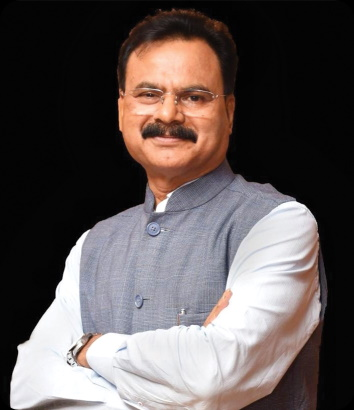

Cabinet Minister, Government of Assam
- Incumbent
- Assumed office 24 May 2016
- Chief Ministers: Sarbananda Sonowal; Himanta Biswa Sarma
- Portfolios: Transport (2016–2022); Commerce and Industry, Skill Entrepreneurship and Employment (2016–2022); Parliamentary Affairs (2016–2021); Act East Policy Affairs (2017–2021, 2022–present); Welfare of Minorities (2021–present); Environment and Forests (2022–present)
- Preceded by: Ajit Singh (Transport); Siddique Ahmed (Commerce & Industry); Rakibul Hussain (Parliamentary Affairs); Ranjit Dutta (Minorities Welfare); Parimal Suklabaidya (Environment & Forests)
- In office 12 June 1996 – 17 May 2001
- Chief Minister: Prafulla Kumar Mahanta
- Portfolios: Agriculture
- Preceded by: Anwara Taimur
- Succeeded by: Ardhendu Kumar Dey

Leader of the Opposition, Assam Legislative Assembly
- In office 5 September 2007 – 5 September 2010
- Preceded by: Position vacant
- Succeeded by: Prafulla Kumar Mahanta
- Constituency: Dharmapur

President, Asom Gana Parishad
- In office 21 September 2008 – 14 May 2011
- Preceded by: Brindaban Goswami
- Succeeded by: Prafulla Kumar Mahanta

Member, Assam Legislative Assembly
- Incumbent
- Assumed office 19 May 2016
- Preceded by: Nilamani Sen Deka
- Constituency: Dharmapur
- In office 11 May 2006 – 13 May 2011
- Preceded by: Nilamani Sen Deka
- Succeeded by: Nilamani Sen Deka
- In office 1985–2001
- Preceded by: Bhumidhar Barman
- Succeeded by: Nilamani Sen Deka

Personal details
- Born: 2 October 1955 (age 70)
- Citizenship: Indian
- Party: Bharatiya Janata Party (from 2014)
- Other political affiliations: Asom Gana Parishad (1985–2014)
- Spouse: Rita Chowdhury
- Education: M.A., LL.B.

Chandra Mohan Patowary (born 2 October 1955) is an Indian politician from Assam who has been serving as the Minister of Environment and Forests, Act East Policy Affairs, Welfare of Minorities in the cabinet of Himanta Biswa Sarma since 2021. He has been elected to the Assam Legislative Assembly six times from the Dharmapur constituency. He also served as a cabinet minister between 1996 and 2001 and from 2016 and 2021 and as the Leader of the Opposition in the Assam Legislative Assembly from 2006 to 2011. He was the health minister of Assam from 1985 to 1990 and agriculture minister from 1996 to 2001. He was the president of the Asom Gana Parishad (AGP) during 2008–2011. He resigned owning responsibility for the party's poor performance in the 2011 Assam Legislative Assembly elections. In 2014, he joined the Bharatiya Janata Party (BJP) in the presence of then BJP National President Rajnath Singh and State President of BJP Assam Pradesh Sarbananda Sonowal.

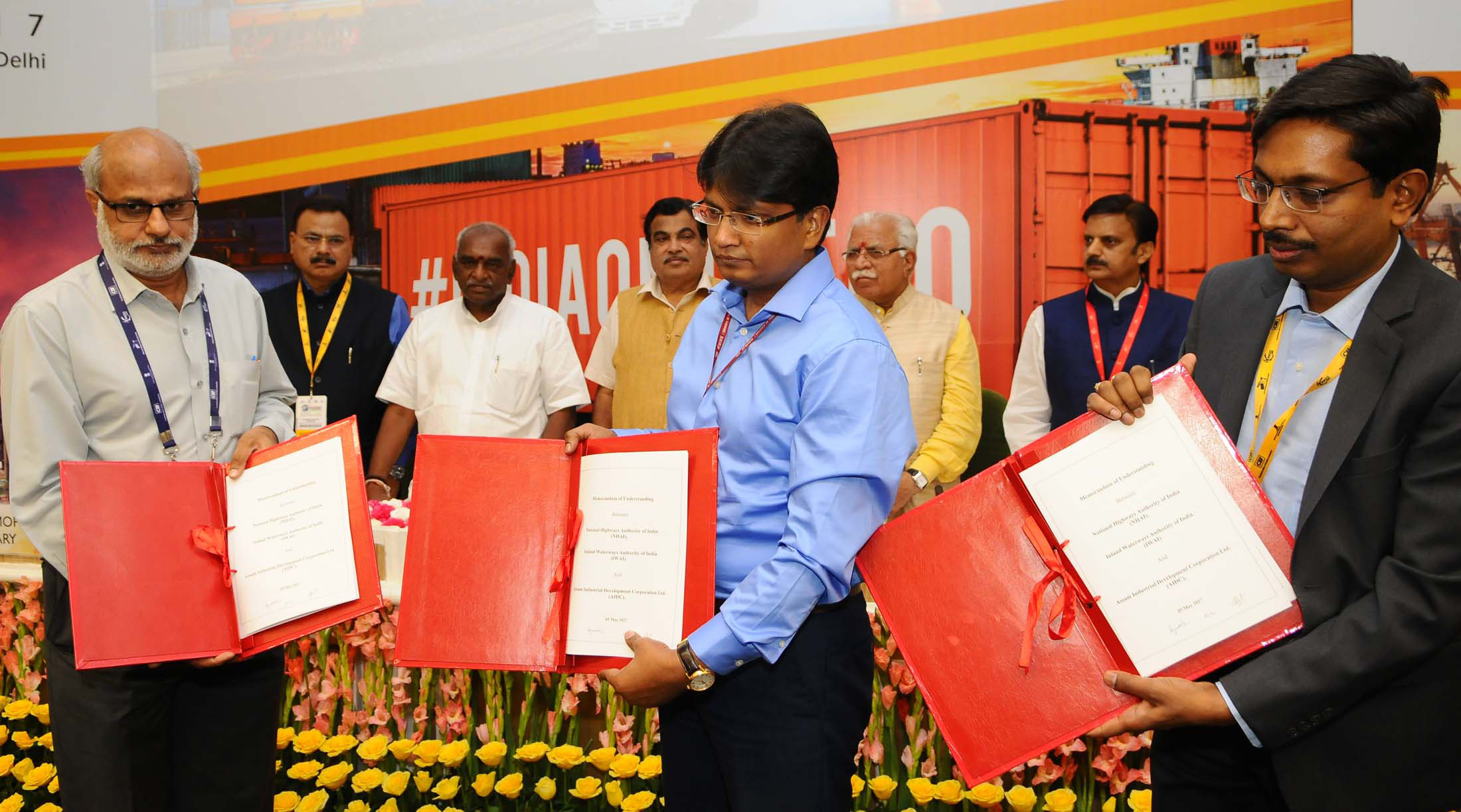
