= Nandita Garlosa =

Indian politician

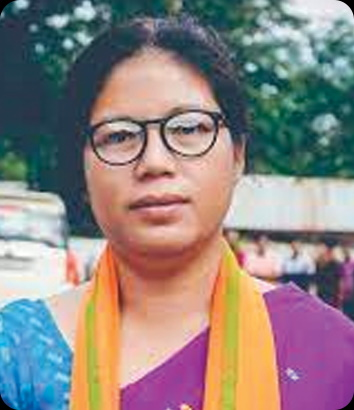
- Official portrait

Cabinet Minister, Assam
- In office 9 June 2022 – 23 March 2026
- Chief Minister: Himanta Biswa Sarma
- Portfolios: Mines and Minerals (2022–23); Power, Co-operation, Indigenous and Tribal Faith and Culture (Archaeology) (2022–24); Sports and Youth Welfare (2023–26); Welfare of Minorities and Development (2024–26); Public Works (Buildings and National Highways) (2024–25)

Member, Assam Legislative Assembly
- In office 2 May 2021 – 23 March 2026
- Preceded by: Bir Bhadra Hagjer
- Constituency: Haflong

Personal details
- Born: 13 May 1977 (age 49) Haflong, Assam, India
- Party: Indian National Congress (since 2026)
- Other political affiliations: Bharatiya Janata Party (until 2026)
- Education: M.Sc. (Zoology)
- Alma mater: Cotton College, Guwahati
- Profession: Politician

Nandita Garlosa (born 13 May 1977) is an Indian National Congress politician from Assam who previously served as the Minister for Power, Cooperation, Mines, Minerals, Indigenous and Tribal Faith and Culture Department in the Sarma Ministry from 2022 till 2026. She left the Bharatiya Janata Party in March 2026 after being denied candidature from the party. She represents the Haflong constituency in the Assam Legislative Assembly since 2021.
