= Parimal Suklabaidya =

Member of Parliament, Lok Sabha

Member of Parliament, Lok Sabha
- Incumbent
- Assumed office 4 June 2024
- Preceded by: Rajdeep Roy
- Constituency: Silchar (SC)

Cabinet Minister, Assam
- In office 24 May 2016 – 14 June 2024
- Chief Ministers: Sarbananda Sonowal; Himanta Biswa Sarma
- Departments: Fisheries, Excise (since 2016); Public Works (2016–18); Environment and Forests (2018–22); Transport (since 2022)
- Preceded by: Basanta Das (Fisheries); Ajit Singh (Excise); Ajanta Neog (PWD); Pramila Rani Brahma (Environment); Chandra Mohan Patowary (Transport)
- Succeeded by: Keshab Mahanta (Fisheries, Excise, Transport); Himanta Biswa Sarma (PWD); Chandra Mohan Patowary (Environment)

Member, Assam Legislative Assembly
- In office 19 May 2016 – 14 June 2024
- Preceded by: Girindra Mallik
- Succeeded by: Nihar Ranjan Das
- Constituency: Dholai (SC)
- In office 14 May 2001 – 14 May 2011
- Preceded by: Girindra Mallik
- Succeeded by: Girindra Mallik
- In office 22 June 1991 – 15 May 1996
- Preceded by: Digendra Purakayastha
- Succeeded by: Girindra Mallik

Personal details
- Born: 20 January 1958 (age 68) Irongmara, Cachar, Assam
- Party: Bharatiya Janata Party
- Occupation: Politician
- Profession: Social worker

Parimal Suklabaidya (born 20 January 1958) is an Indian politician from the state of Assam. He is a member of the Assam Legislative Assembly from the Bharatiya Janata Party. He became a minister in the Sarbananda Sonowal-led government in 2016. He has been elected for the fourth time from the Dholai constituency.

== Electoral history ==
=== Lok Sabha elections ===
Year	Constituency	Party	Votes	%	Opponent		Result	Margin
1999	Karimganj	BJP	294,540	42.3%	Nepal Chandra Das	INC	Lost	42,259
2004	Karimganj	BJP	229,111	34.1%	Lalit Mohan Suklabaidya	INC	Lost	91,948
2024	Silchar	BJP	652,405	59.9%	Surya Kanta Sarkar	INC	Won	264,311

=== Legislative Assembly elections ===
Year	Constituency	Party	Votes	%	Opponent		Result	Margin
1991	Dholai	BJP	32,678	45.4%	Kamakhya Prasad Mala	AGP	Won	16,312
1996	Dholai	BJP	23,175	30.4%	Girindra Mallik	INC	Lost	3,857
2001	Dholai	BJP	26,284	34.7%	Kamakhya Prasad Mala	AGP	Won	3,354
2006	Dholai	BJP	35,919	37.2%	Kamakhya Prasad Mala	AGP	Won	12,990
2011	Dholai	BJP	38,364	37.3%	Girindra Mallik	INC	Lost	14,370
2016	Dholai	BJP	68,694	54.4%	Girindra Mallik	INC	Won	26,837
2021	Dholai	BJP	82,568	55.6%	Kamakhya Prasad Mala	INC	Won	23,392
