= Pijush Hazarika =

Indian politician

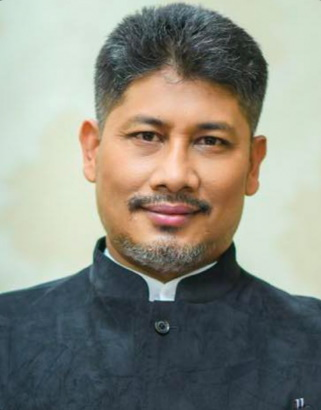
- Official portrait

Cabinet Minister, Government of Assam
- Incumbent
- Assumed office 24 May 2016
- Chief Minister: Sarbananda Sonowal; Himanta Biswa Sharma
- Departments: Agriculture; Irrigation; Parliamentary Affairs(2021-24, 2026–Incumbent); Water Resources(2021-2026); Information and Public Relations and Printing and Stationery(2021-2026); Social Justice and Empowerment(2021-2026); Town and Country Planning (I/C)(2020-2021); Urban Development (I/C)(2020-2021)

Member of Assam Legislative Assembly
- Incumbent
- Assumed office 19 May 2016
- Constituency: Jagiroad

Personal details
- Born: 17 June 1977 (age 49) Raha, Nagaon
- Party: Bharatiya Janata Party (2015–present)
- Other political affiliations: Indian National Congress (2011–2015)
- Spouse: Aimee Baruah (m. 2011)
- Children: 2
- Education: B.A
- Profession: Politician, pisciculturist

Pijush Hazarika is an Indian politician from Assam belonging to the Bharatiya Janata Party. He has been a member of Assam legislative assembly since 2011. He was elected in Assam Legislative Assembly election in 2011 from Raha constituency and in 2016 and 2021 from Jagiroad constituency.

== Personal life ==
Pijush Hazarika was born at Ahutguri, Morigaon located in the Nagaon district of Assam to Shisuram Hazarika and Pramila Hazarika. Hazarika did Bachelor of Arts from Arya Vidyapeeth College in Guwahati.

On 1 October 2011, Hazarika married actress Aimee Baruah. He is the father of two children.

== Controversy ==
- An audio clip of Hazarika has gone viral where he was heard threatening a journalist of the news channel Pratidin Time for airing a news report related to his wife Aimee Baruah.
- Hazarika while he was the minister for water resources and public affairs, responded to claims that Himanta Biswa Sarma's family was involved in corrupt activities during the COVID era.
- Hazarika, objected to the construction of the Miya Museum in the Goalpara district, saying that doing so amounted to plundering Assamese culture.
