= Keshab Mahanta =

Indian politician

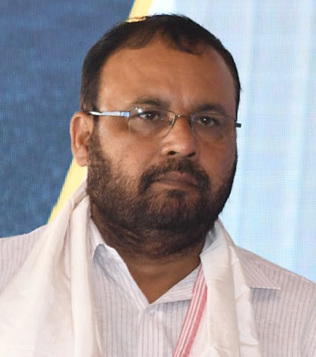
- Official portrait, 2018

Cabinet Minister, Assam
- Incumbent
- Assumed office 24 May 2016
- Chief Ministers: Sarbananda Sonowal; Himanta Biswa Sarma
- Departments: General Administration (2026-present); Science, Technology and Climate Change (2016–present); Information Technology (2016–2026); Water Resources (2016–21); Library and Archaeology (2018–21); Health and Family Welfare (2021–24); Transport, Excise (2024); Revenue and Disaster Management (2024–present)
- Preceded by: Tarun Gogoi (Sc&Tech, IT); Basanta Das (Water); Himanta Biswa Sarma (Health); Parimal Suklabaidya (Transport, Excise); Jogen Mohan (Revenue)

Member, Assam Legislative Assembly
- Incumbent
- Assumed office 11 May 2006
- Preceded by: Gunin Hazarika
- Constituency: Kaliabor

Working President, Asom Gana Parishad
- Incumbent
- Assumed office 2014
- President: Atul Bora

Member of Parliament, Lok Sabha
- In office 10 May 1996 – 3 March 1998
- Preceded by: Tarun Gogoi
- Succeeded by: Tarun Gogoi
- Constituency: Kaliabor

Personal details
- Born: 6 July 1959 (age 67) Nagaon, Assam
- Party: Asom Gana Parishad
- Spouse: Chayanika Mahanta
- Children: 2

Keshab Mahanta (born 6 July 1959) is an Indian politician of Asom Gana Parishad. He was elected to the Lok Sabha, lower house of the Parliament of India, from the Kaliabor Constituency of Assam from 1996 to 1998 as a member of the Asom Gana Parishad. He was elected to the Assam Legislative Assembly from Kaliabor constituency since 2006. He is also serving as the minister of Health and Family Welfare and Science and Technology, Information and Technology Departments, Government of Assam in the Sarma Ministry since 2021 and was a former minister of Water Resources and Science and Technology, Information and Technology Departments, Government of Assam from 2016 to 2021 in the Sonowal ministry. He was also working president of Asom Gana Parishad since 2014.

== Electoral history ==
=== Lok Sabha elections ===
Year	Constituency	Party	Votes	%	Opponent		Result	Margin
1996	Kaliabor	AGP	283,086	36.4%	Tarun Gogoi	INC	Won	1,616
1998	Kaliabor	AGP	151,487	22.8%	Tarun Gogoi	INC	Lost	232,335
1999	Kaliabor	AGP	206,150	26.4%	Tarun Gogoi	INC	Lost	167,392
2004	Kaliabor	AGP	234,695	30.7%	Dip Gogoi	INC	Lost	67,198

=== Assam Legislative Assembly elections ===
Year	Constituency	Party	Votes	%	Opponent		Result	Margin
2006	Kaliabor	AGP	37,031	42.2%	Simanchal Digal	INC	Won	11,832
2011	Kaliabor	AGP	44,886	49.6%	Tapan Borah	INC	Won	9,029
2016	Kaliabor	AGP	64,759	63.0%	Bindu Ganju	INC	Won	37,990
2021	Kaliabor	AGP	73,677	59.9%	Prasanta Kumar Saikia	INC	Won	28,720
2026	Kaliabor	AGP	74,029	45.1%	Jiten Gour	Independent	Won	17,890
