= Government of Assam =

Indian State Government

- Seal of Assam
- Polity type: Parliamentary republic State government
- Constitution: Constitution of India

Legislative branch
- Name: Assam Legislative Assembly
- Type: Unicameral
- Meeting place: Guwahati
- Lower house
- Name: Assam Legislative Assembly
- Presiding officer: Biswajit Daimary, Speaker

Executive branch
- Head of state
- Title: Governor
- Currently: Lakshman Prasad Acharya
- Appointer: President of India (on advice of Central Government)
- Head of government
- Title: Chief Minister of Assam
- Currently: Himanta Biswa Sarma
- Appointer: Governor of Assam
- Cabinet
- Name: Council of Ministers of Assam
- Leader: Himanta Biswa Sarma
- Headquarters: Guwahati
- Ministries: Second Sarma ministry

Judicial branch
- Name: Gauhati High Court
- Courts: Judiciary of India
- Gauhati High Court
- Chief judge: Ashutosh kumar
- Seat: Guwahati

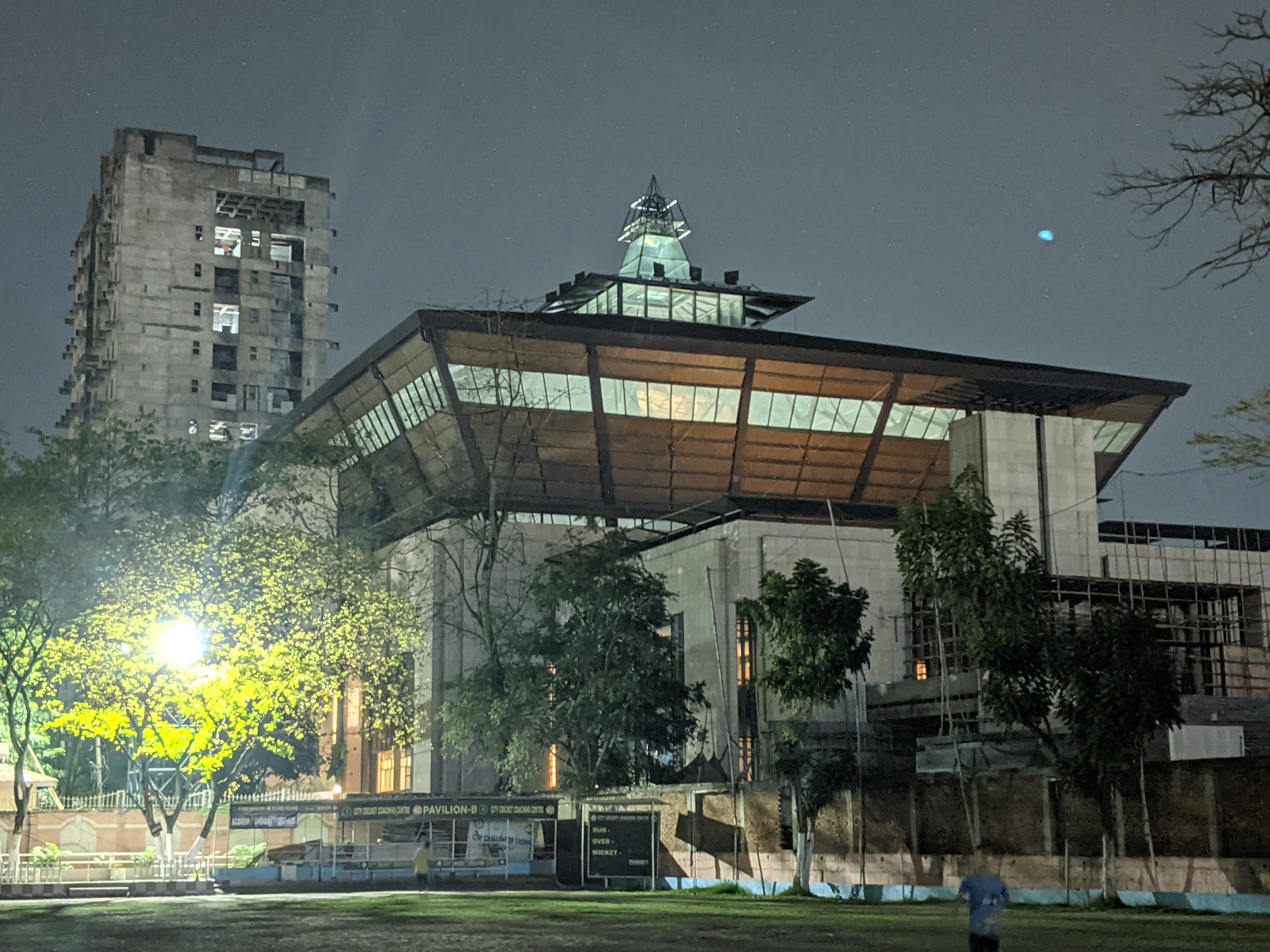
New Assembly Hall of the Assam Legislative Assembly in Dispur

The Government of Assam or Assam Government abbreviated as GoAS, is the state government of the Indian state of Assam. It consists of the Governor appointed by the President of India as the head of the state, currently Lakshman Prasad Acharya. The head of government is the Chief Minister, currently Dr. Himanta Biswa Sarma, who is the leader of the group that commands a majority in the unicameral Assam Legislative Assembly. The Assam Assembly is elected by universal adult suffrage for a period of five years. The Chief Minister is assisted by a Council of Ministers that he nominates, the size of which is restricted.

In 2026, the National Democratic Alliance won a majority of seats in the legislature, with 102 seats, followed by Congress with 19 seats and AIUDF with 2.

== Council of Ministers ==
The current state council of ministers is headed by chief minister Himanta Biswa Sarma which was sworn-in into office for a second term on 12 May 2026.

Portfolio	Minister	Took office	Left office	Party
Chief Minister and also in-charge of: Department of Home and Political; Department of Public Works (Buildings and National Highways); Department of Public Works (Roads); Department of Power; Department of Information, Public Relations, Printing and Stationery; All other departments not allocated to any Minister.	Himanta Biswa Sarma	12 May 2026	Incumbent	BJP
Minister of Transformation and Development; Minister of Labour Welfare; Minister of Tea Tribes and Adivasi Welfare	Rameswar Teli	12 May 2026	Incumbent	BJP
Minister of Panchayat and Rural Development; Minister of Implementation of Assam Accord; Minister of Border Protection and Development; Minister of Excise	Atul Bora	12 May 2026	Incumbent	AGP
Minister of Transport; Minister of Welfare of Bodoland	Charan Boro	12 May 2026	Incumbent	BPF
Minister of Women and Child Development; Minister of Tourism	Ajanta Neog	12 May 2026	Incumbent	BJP
Minister of Parliamentary Affairs
Minister of Parliamentary Affairs	Pijush Hazarika	5 June 2026	Incumbent	BJP
Minister of Social Justice and Empowerment; Minister of Soil Conservation; Minister of Welfare of Minorities and Development
Minister of Social Justice and Empowerment; Minister of Soil Conservation; Minister of Welfare of Minorities and Development	Ashwini Roy Sarkar	5 June 2026	Incumbent	BJP
Minister of Health and Family Welfare; Minister of Medical Education and Research
Minister of Health and Family Welfare; Minister of Medical Education and Research	Ashok Singhal	5 June 2026	Incumbent	BJP
Minister of Cultural Affairs; Minister of Industries, Commerce and Public Enterprises; Minister of Act East Policy Affairs
Minister of Cultural Affairs; Minister of Industries, Commerce and Public Enterprises; Minister of Act East Policy Affairs	Bimal Bora	5 June 2026	Incumbent	BJP
Minister of Handloom, Textiles and Sericulture; Minister of Sports and Youth Welfare; Minister of Skill, Employment and Entrepreneurship; Minister of Indigenous and Tribal Faith and Culture
Minister of Handloom, Textiles and Sericulture; Minister of Sports and Youth Welfare; Minister of Skill, Employment and Entrepreneurship; Minister of Indigenous and Tribal Faith and Culture	Biswajit Daimary	5 June 2026	Incumbent	BJP
Minister of Finance; Minister of Environment and Forest; Minister of Mines and Minerals
Minister of Finance; Minister of Environment and Forest; Minister of Mines and Minerals	Jayanta Malla Baruah	5 June 2026	Incumbent	BJP
Minister of Food, Public Distribution and Consumer Affairs; Minister of Housing and Urban Affairs; Minister of Cooperation
Minister of Food, Public Distribution and Consumer Affairs; Minister of Housing and Urban Affairs; Minister of Cooperation	Kaushik Rai	5 June 2026	Incumbent	BJP
Minister of Revenue and Disaster Management; Minister of Science, Technology and Climate Change; Minister of General Administration
Minister of Revenue and Disaster Management; Minister of Science, Technology and Climate Change; Minister of General Administration	Keshab Mahanta	5 June 2026	Incumbent	AGP
Minister of Public Health Engineering; Minister of Hill Areas Development; Minister of Barak Valley Development
Minister of Public Health Engineering; Minister of Hill Areas Development; Minister of Barak Valley Development	Krishnendu Paul	5 June 2026	Incumbent	BJP
Minister of Animal Husbandry and Veterinary; Minister of Fisheries
Minister of Animal Husbandry and Veterinary; Minister of Fisheries	Nilima Devi	5 June 2026	Incumbent	BJP
Minister of Agriculture; Minister of Irrigation
Minister of Agriculture; Minister of Irrigation	Pijush Hazarika	5 June 2026	Incumbent	BJP
Minister of School Education; Minister of Higher Education; Minister of Tribal Affairs (Plains); Minister of Information Technology
Minister of School Education; Minister of Higher Education; Minister of Tribal Affairs (Plains); Minister of Information Technology	Ranoj Pegu	5 June 2026	Incumbent	BJP
Minister of Water Resources; Minister of Judicial
Minister of Water Resources; Minister of Judicial	Sushanta Borgohain	5 June 2026	Incumbent	BJP

== Leaders ==
House	Leader	Portrait	Since
Constitutional Posts
Governor	Lakshaman Acharya		30 July 2024
Speaker	Biswajit Daimary		21 May 2021
Deputy Speaker	Numal Momin		21 May 2021
Chief Minister	Himanta Biswa Sarma		10 May 2021
Political Posts
Leader of the House	Himanta Biswa Sarma		10 May 2021
Leader of Indian National Congress Leader of the Opposition	Debabrata Saikia		20 May 2021
Leader of Asom Gana Parishad	Atul Bora		15 July 2014
