= Himanta Biswa Sarma =

Chief Minister of Assam since 2021

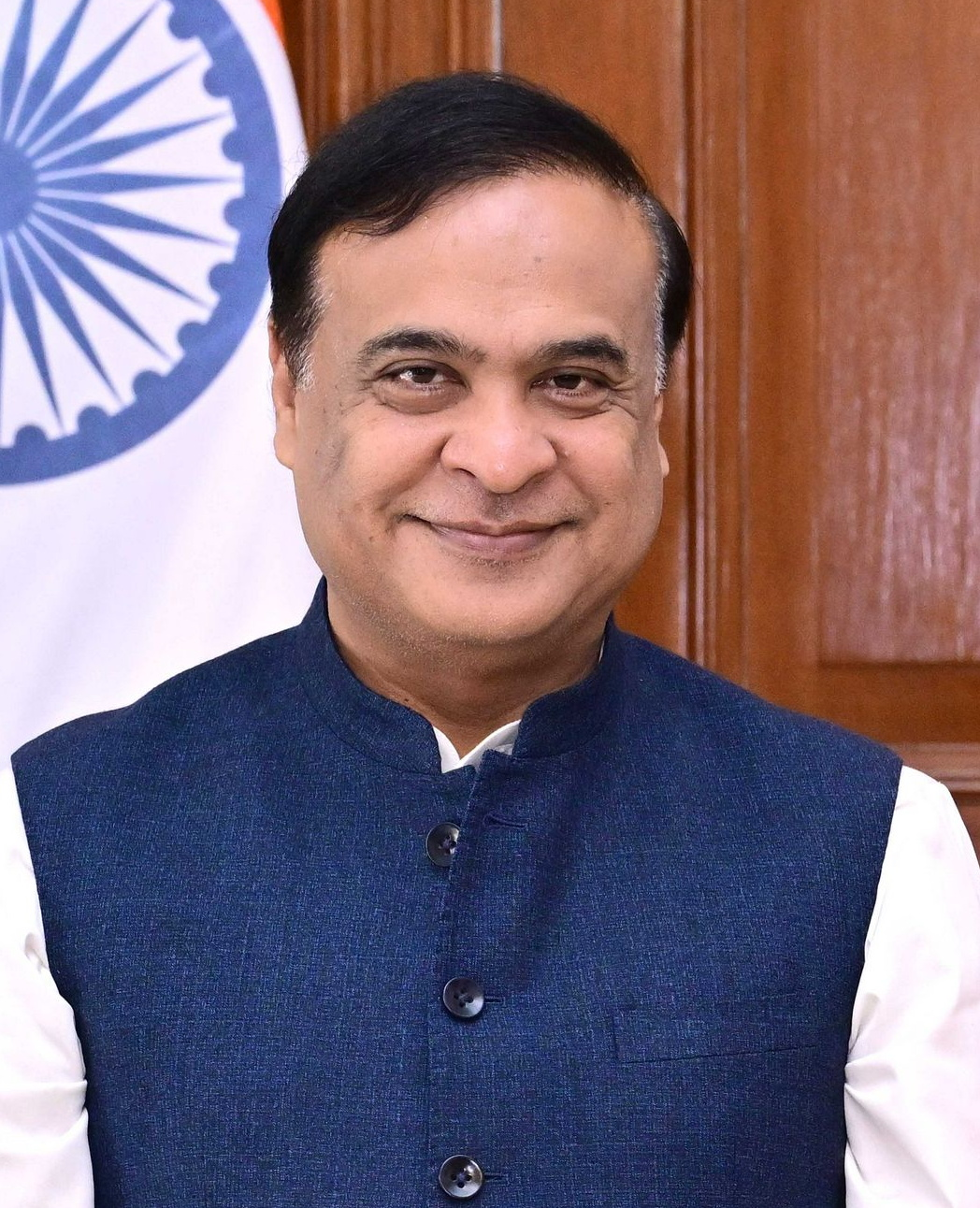
- Sarma in 2026

15th Chief Minister of Assam
- Incumbent
- Assumed office 10 May 2021
- Governor: Jagdish Mukhi; Gulab Chand Kataria; Lakshman Prasad Acharya
- Cabinet: Sarma-I; Sarma-II
- Departments: List: Home; Personnel; Public Works Department (Buildings and National Highways & Roads); Power; Information, Public Relations; Printing and Stationery; General Administration, Act East Policy Affairs (2021–22); Judicial (2021–24); Health and Family Welfare (2024); Medical Education and Research (2024–2026); Welfare of Minorities and Development, Sports and Youth Welfare (2026-2026)
- Preceded by: Sarbananda Sonowal

Cabinet Minister, Government of Assam
- In office 24 May 2016 – 10 May 2021
- Chief Minister: Sarbananda Sonowal
- Departments: Finance; Health and Family Welfare; Education (2016–18, 2020–21); Khadi and Village Industries, Planning and Development, Tourism, Guwahati Development, Co-operation, Pension and Public Grievances (2016–18); Public Works, Transformation and Development (2018–21)
- In office 21 May 2006 – 23 July 2014
- Chief Minister: Tarun Gogoi
- Departments: Health and Family Welfare; Guwahati Development, Information Technology, Science and Technology (2006–11); Education, Implementation of Assam Accord (2011–14)

Minister of State, Government of Assam
- In office 11 September 2004 – 21 May 2006
- Chief Minister: Tarun Gogoi
- Departments: Finance; Planning and Development
- In office 7 June 2002 – 6 July 2004
- Chief Minister: Tarun Gogoi
- Departments: Agriculture; Planning and Development

Member of Assam Legislative Assembly
- Incumbent
- Assumed office 13 May 2001
- Preceded by: Bhrigu Phukan
- Constituency: Jalukbari

Founder-Convener of the North-East Democratic Alliance
- Incumbent
- Assumed office 24 May 2016
- National Chairman: Amit Shah; J. P. Nadda; Nitin Nabin

President of Badminton Association of India
- Incumbent
- Assumed office 2017
- Preceded by: Akhilesh Das

Personal details
- Born: 1 February 1969 (age 57) Jorhat, Assam, India
- Party: Bharatiya Janata Party (2015–present)
- Other political affiliations: Indian National Congress (1991–2015)
- Spouse: Riniki Bhuyan Sarma (m. 2001)
- Children: 2
- Education: Cotton College (BA, MA); BRM Government Law College (LLB); Gauhati University (PhD)
- Occupation: Lawyer; politician
- Website: www.himantabiswasarma.com

Himanta Biswa Sarma (born 1 February 1969) is an Indian politician and lawyer serving as the 15th and the current Chief Minister of Assam since 2021. A former member of the Indian National Congress, Sarma joined the Bharatiya Janata Party (BJP) on 23 August 2015 and soon was made convenor of North East Democratic Alliance (NEDA). He is a six-time member of the Assam Legislative Assembly from Jalukbari, having been elected since 2001.

== Early life and education ==
Sarma was born on 1 February 1969 in Jorhat, Assam. The family, including six siblings, later shifted to Ulubari, Gandhibasti locality in Guwahati. He belongs to an Assamese family which traces its origins to Latima in Nalbari district. Sarma married Riniki Bhuyan Sarma in 2001, with whom he has a son, Nandil Biswa Sarma, who attended The Doon School, and a daughter, Sukanya Sarma, who attended Mayo College Girls School.

Sarma was educated at Kamrup Academy School, Guwahati in 1985 and joined Cotton College, Guwahati (now known as Cotton University) for his undergraduate education. He was elected the General Secretary of Cotton College Students Union, three times in 1988-89, 1989–90, and 1991-1992. Sarma is the seventh chief minister of Assam from Cotton University.

He obtained a Bachelor of Arts in 1990 and Master of Arts in 1992, both in political science, from the university. Thereafter, Sarma obtained a Bachelor of Laws from Government Law College, Guwahati, and became a solicitor in 1995. He practised law at the Gauhati High Court from 1996 to 2001. In 2006, he completed a Doctorate of Philosophy in political science from Gauhati University on the topic North Eastern Council: A structural and functional analysis, defending his dissertation shortly before he was elected to public office.

== Political career ==
=== Indian National Congress ===
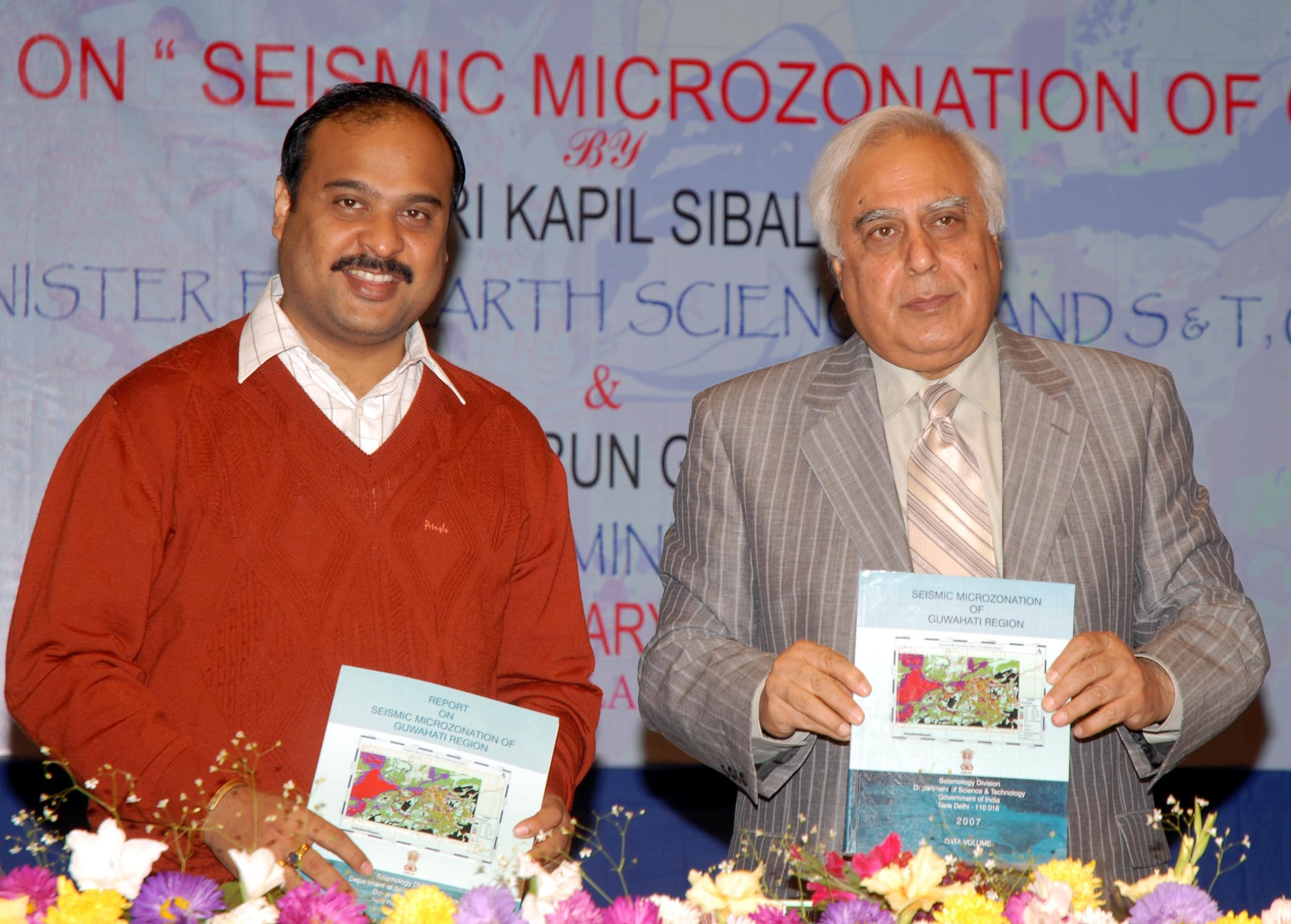
Sarma with Kapil Sibal, releasing a report on Seismic Microzonation of Guwahati, on 18 January 2008

Sarma was elected to the Assam Legislative Assembly from Jalukbari for the first time in 2001 when he defeated Asom Gana Parishad leader Bhrigu Kumar Phukan. He was re-elected in 2006, then in 2011 for a third consecutive term with a 78,000 vote margin. Sarma held important portfolios (both state and cabinet) as Minister of State for Agriculture, Planning and Development, Finance, Health, Education, and Assam Accord Implementation from 2002 to 2014.

He was made Cabinet Minister for Health in 2006, and in 2011 he was also entrusted with the additional charge of Education. During his tenure, three medical colleges in Jorhat, Barpeta and Tezpur were built. He also initiated work for five more medical colleges in Diphu, Nagaon, Dhubri, North Lakhimpur and Kokrajhar, which are now in various startup stages.

=== Bharatiya Janata Party ===
After political disagreements with the former chief minister Tarun Gogoi, Sarma resigned from all positions on 21 July 2014. He was a Member of the Legislative Assembly of the Jalukbari constituency until his resignation from the Assembly on 15 September 2015. Sarma joined Bharatiya Janata Party on 23 August 2015 at the residence of Amit Shah at New Delhi. He was appointed the party's Convener of the Election Management Committee for the upcoming Assembly Elections in the state. In May 2016, Sarma won the Jalukbari constituency for the fourth consecutive term and was sworn in as Cabinet Minister on 24 May in Sonowal ministry, in the first BJP Government in North East India. He was allotted portfolios like Finance, Health & Family Welfare, Education, Planning & Development, Tourism, Pension & Public Grievances.

== Sports administrator ==
On 23 April 2017, Sarma was unanimously elected as President of Badminton Association of India. Sarma has been the president of the Assam Badminton Association. He also became the president of the Assam Cricket Association in June 2016 when his party man Pradip Buragohain became the secretary. Sarma was also the longest-serving vice-president of the association, serving from 2002 to 2016.

On 25 March 2022, Sarma was re-elected as the president of Badminton Association of India for a second term of four years from 2022 to 2026 in general body meeting in Guwahati.

== Chief Minister of Assam (2021-present) ==
=== Appointment ===
On 8 May 2021, Sarma along with Chief Minister Sarbananda Sonowal were summoned to New Delhi, for discussions on the formation of a new government. Sarma and Sonowal held a series of meetings lasting more than 4 hours with BJP President J. P. Nadda and Home Minister Amit Shah. On 9 May Sonowal tendered his resignation to Governor Jagdish Mukhi, ahead of a meeting the same day to decide the next Chief Minister. Sarma's name was proposed by the outgoing Sonowal, BJP state president Ranjeet Kumar Dass and newly elected MLA Nandita Garlosa. As no other name was presented to be chief minister, Sarma was unanimously elected as the BJP legislature leader.

On 10 May 2021, Sarma was sworn in as the 15th Chief Minister of Assam by Governor Mukhi, succeeding Sonowal. He was congratulated by Prime Minister Narendra Modi on his appointment. The BJP government was reelected with a majority in the 2026 Assam Legislative Assembly election, with Sarma returning as Chief Minister.

=== Tenure ===
Sarma's tenure has been focused on exacerbating ethnic divisions in the state of Assam between Assamese and minority ethnic populations. In June 2021 he publicly urged the muslim community to adopt family planning measures, such that they reduce their rate of birth. He also advocated for a new law against illegal cattle smuggling in Assam. Mission Basundhara was launched under Sarma in 2021; a program aimed to support local landowners expand property rights. The Assam government, under his leadership, announced the conversion of 740 muslim schools, or madrasas, funded by the state to public schools. His government has demolished many Islamic madrasas in the state, alleging their association with terrorist groups and organisations. He continues to push for the removal of muslim cultural and educational institutions, as well as forced removal of these populations from their existing landholdings in Assam. In 2025, 40,000 individuals were evicted from their dwellings. Reasons cited by Sarma and other officials included encroachment on government land, environmental degradation and development projects.

==== Boundary dispute with Mizoram ====
On 26 July 2021, Assam Police and Mizoram Police (Mizoram is an adjacent state to Assam on its southern boundary) fired upon each other supposedly as part of the decades-old Assam-Mizoram border dispute. Assam lost six police personnel and a civilian in the firefight, while one youth from Mizoram suffered a gunshot wound. Both sides charged each other with opening fire first.

Reports from news media indicate that on 24 July 2021, Himanta Biswa Sarma and Zoramthanga had a one-to-one talk about the boundary dispute where both agreed to settle the matter amicably through talks. Before this could take place, and only two days after the two Chief Ministers held their talks, this incident took place.

Days after skirmish which left dozens of others injured, the Assam government on 29 July 2021 issued a travel advisory, asking people of the state not to travel to Mizoram - the first such travel advisory ever, by a state in the independent India. Himanta retracted from this advisory a day later. Further, Assam's Home and Political Department said on 29 July that the police should carry out an intensive drive against drugs and check all vehicles entering into Assam from Mizoram.

==== Forced evictions of muslim population ====
Since 2021, Sarma has carried out the eviction of thousands of Bengali Muslims within Assam. In January 2026, referring to the minority Muslim population as Miyas, he claimed he will be evicting all of them, but not those of Assamese heritage. In March 2026, he promised to carry out larger eviction drives if he received a positive electoral result. He has frequently campaigned with marches that feature bulldozers.

== Electoral performance ==
Assam Legislative Assembly
Year	Constituency	Party	Votes	%	Opponent	Opponent Party	Opponent Votes	%	Margin	Margin in %	Result
2001	Jalukbari	INC	45,054	46.76%	Bhrigu Kumar Phukan	NCP	35,035	36.36%	10,019	10.40%	Won
2006	Jalukbari	INC	76,948	63.47%	Puspa Deka	AGP	34,480	28.44%	42,468	35.03%	Won
2011	Jalukbari	INC	93,812	72.09%	Prodyut Bora	BJP	16,409	12.61%	77,403	59.48%	Won
2016	Jalukbari	BJP	118,390	76.16%	Niren Deka	INC	32,455	20.87%	85,935	55.29%	Won
2021	Jalukbari	BJP	130,762	77.39%	Ramen Chandra Borthakur	INC	28,851	17.07%	1,01,911	60.325%	Won
2026	Jalukbari	BJP	127,151	74.20%	Bidisha Neog	INC	37,717	22.07%	89,434	52.13%	Won

== Controversies ==
Biswa has often been seen mired in controversies on two counts, one as regards his extremely hardline and inflammatory comments against the Muslim community and other as regards the allegations of corruption. He currently leads all efforts in Assam to evict Bengali-speaking muslims in the state, at the direction of the BJP, demolishing over 22,000 structures between 2021 and 2026. He has often made divergent claims publicly.

In 2011, Paresh Baruah led ULFA faction claimed that Sharma is a former member of the militant outfit. In April 2021, Himanta Biswa Sarma announced that there is no need to wear masks in the state as there is no more coronavirus present in Assam when India was undergoing the second wave of COVID-19. In June 2025, Sarma said that the terms socialism and secularism should be removed from the Constitution of India.

=== Anti-Muslim remarks ===
==== 2020 ====
In November 2020, Biswa posted on social media, claiming that supporters of AIUDF Chief and Dhubri MP, Badruddin Ajmal had shouted slogans in support of Pakistan to greet him, on his arrival at Silchar airport. Biswa's claim was reiterated by an Assamese news channel, News Live, which is owned by Biswa's wife, and then also confirmed by several news channels and newspapers, including Times Now, CNN News18, and The New Indian Express. Biswa's post was initially flagged by Facebook as misinformation but later this caution tag was removed and post was restored. Facebook's spokesperson told The Indian Express that the tag was erroneously put on Sarma’s post. Guwahati Police have since registered multiple First Information Reports, opened a case and arrested an AIUDF member named Nasir Uddin.

==== 2021 ====
Though Sarma was implicated in the Manabendra Sarma case he was acquitted by the court. A Delhi-based advocate from Assam has lodged a complaint with the National Human Rights Commission (NHRC) against the Assam Police "on an encounter spree" since Sarma stated in the police conference that police should shoot alleged criminals at legs which are permitted by the law. The Supreme Court in its judgement on the appeal filed against the Gauhati High Court judgement which refused to order for independent inquiry ordered for inquiry and investigation of all the police encounters by the Assam Human Rights Commission.

==== 2022 ====
On 11 February 2022 while addressing a rally at Uttarakhand, Sarma said to Rahul Gandhi, "Did we ever ask you for proof of whether you are Rajiv Gandhi's son or not?" His statements were criticised by then Chief Minister of Telangana, KCR for using derogatory language against a Member of Parliament and said these derogatory language should not be used by a chief minister of a state. TPCC president Revanth Reddy filed a complain at Jubilee Hills police station of Hyderabad. A case has been registered under sections 504 and 505 (2) of the Indian Penal Code against Himanta Biswa Sarma. Reddy said, "Himanta Biswa Sarma's remarks are humiliating for a woman" and asked "Why did the Chief Electoral Officer of the National Election Commission not order the arrest of Himanta Biswa Sarma?". "BJP should remove Himanta Biswa from the post of Chief Minister. But the BJP is supporting the remarks of the Assam Chief Minister." On 19 September 2023, Uttarakhand High Court summoned Sarma for his remarks.

==== 2023 ====
During Prime Minister Narendra Modi's visit to the United States in June 2023, former President Barack Obama made comments about Muslims in India. In response, Sarma claimed with Islamophobic slur that there are many "Hussain Obama in India" (in reference to Obama's full name, Barack Hussein Obama II) and his priority will be in dealing with them. This triggered extensive discussions in India and abroad.

In July 2023, an Independent Rajya Sabha member, Ajit Kumar Bhuyan filed a police complaint against Assam Chief Minister Himanta Biswa Sarma, accusing him of delivering a "hate speech" against the 'Miya' community (Bengali-Muslim Community) who often are targets of communal attacks. Sarma had commented on high vegetable prices, stating that Miya vendors charge more in Guwahati compared to Assamese vendors. He emphasised clearing footpaths and urged Assamese people to initiate businesses. The remarks sparked controversy and led to a formal complaint against the Chief Minister.

On 19 September, while addressing a rally in Madhya Pradesh, Sarma told Kamal Nath to burn 10, Janpath (residence of Sonia Gandhi) to prove his Hindu identity. A few days later, Leader of Opposition, Assam, Debabrata Saikia filed FIR on Sarma for hate speech. The remarks triggered political reactions and public debate, with critics describing them as communal, while supporters said the comments were aimed at addressing demographic trends in the state.

==== 2025 ====
In December 2025, Sarma made remarks on population growth while addressing a public gathering in Barpeta district, stating that the birth rate among Hindus in Assam was declining compared to Muslims. He urged Hindu families not to limit themselves to one or two children and suggested that, where possible, they should have three children. He also stated that family sizes among Muslims should remain limited, citing demographic balance as a concern.

==== 2026 ====
In February 2026, the Bharatiya Janata Party shared an AI-generated video of Sarma shooting with his rifle aimed towards an image of Muslim men titled "No Mercy", promoting it on their social media platforms. The video was later deleted after widespread outrage.

In February 2026, CPI(M) and Annie Raja along with four Assamese individuals, Assamese scholar Dr Hiren Gohain, former DGP of Assam, Harekrishna Deka and others filed separate PIL in Supreme Court of India against Sarma alleging him of repeatedly making statements inciting discrimination and violence against Bengali-origin Muslims in Assam. The Supreme Court asked petitioners to approach the Gauhati High Court, expressing its reluctance to invoke Article 32, and said that the petitioners should first approach the jurisdictional High Courts.

In April 2026, Dr Hiren Gohain and two others filed a PIL in Guawhati High Court seeking directions to restrain Sarma from making alleged hate speeches and for the initiation of an inquiry and/or investigation into the alleged commission of cognisable offence/s under various sections of BNS. The Court sought response from Sarma. Responding to the PIL, Sarma said that the accusations are based on isolated lines capable of distorting his true intent. He has prayed before the Court to direct the petitioners to produce the original, full and unedited transcripts and statements, to be in a position to present appropriate reply.

In May 2026, Activist and former IAS officer Harsh Mander presented a complaint against Sarma before the Delhi Court regarding a series of alleged public statements made by him exhorting people to harm "Miyas" and making other alleged incendiary statements against Miya community, seeking registration of FIR in the matter. The Judicial Magistrate First Class Court dismissed this petition and refused to direct registration of FIR. It cited lack of territorial jurisdiction and lack of material to prove that the alleged remarks caused enmity and disharmony in Delhi Court's jurisdiction. Mander has challenged this Order before the Revisional Court, which had issued notice to Sarma.

=== Corruption allegations against wife ===
On 5 April 2026, in the midst of 2026 Assembly Elections, Congress Spokesperson Pawan Khera made allegations against Sarma and his wife Riniki Bhuyan, including that his wife held multiple passports, foreign properties, and a foreign company listed in the United States. Kheda alleged his wife held three passports additional to an Indian passport, including the United Arab Emirates, Antigua and Barbuda, and Egypt. She was also accused of owning two properties in Dubai and having Rs. 52,000 crores worth of assets in a firm named, Riniki Bhuyan Sarma Asset Collective LLC, registered in the state of Wyoming.

Both Biswa Sarma and Riniki Bhuyan immediately reacted by rejecting these allegations as “malicious, fabricated and politically motivated”.

While Himanta presented a detailed point by point rebuttal of the charges, calling the documents AI generated and alleging the entire matter to have Pakistan connection, his wife getting an FIR registered against Pawan Khera at Crime Branch of Panbazar Police Station in Guwahati.

Khera initially approached the Telangana High Court, which on 10 April 2026 granted him one week's transit anticipatory bail to enable him to seek regular relief before the competent court in Assam. On 15 April, the Supreme Court of India stayed the operation of the transit anticipatory bail. Following this, Khera moved the Gauhati High Court seeking anticipatory bail. The High Court rejected the plea, holding that custodial interrogation was necessary to ascertain the source of the documents relied upon by Khera. Later The Supreme Court granted anticipatory bail to Khera.

While the matter is still pending, Himanta seems to have changed his stand and is calling the entire episode political in nature, even thanking Khera for allegedly contributing in Congress defeat.

In May 2026, Pawan Khera was questioned by Assam Crime Branch for long hours continuously for two days, while he has been called for questioning the third time, and other Congress leaders like Randeep Surjewala have also been called for questioning.

=== Anti-Christian remarks ===
After the 2024 Indian general election, Sarma attributed the National Democratic Alliance's losses in parts of Northeast India to the influence of "a particular religion", a remark that opposition politicians and Christian groups criticised as anti-Christian. Earlier in 2024, the North East Catholic Research Forum sent Sarma a memorandum criticising his "silence" over groups targeting Christians in Assam and warning that the Assam Healing (Prevention of Evil) Practices Bill could be used to criminalise Christian prayer services. Christian leaders in Assam have also accused his government of neglecting the community.

=== Pushback comments and diplomatic protest ===
On 15 April 2026, Biswa Sarma gave an interview to ABP News in which he discussed the issue of alleged undocumented migrants from Bangladesh. In the interview, he stated that formal deportation through the Ministry of External Affairs (India) was difficult and described informal “pushback” practices, claiming that individuals were taken to border areas at night and forced across without formal procedures. He also asserted that there was no extradition treaty between India and Bangladesh, despite the existence of a bilateral extradition agreement signed in 2013. His remarks raised concerns regarding legality, due process, and human rights, as well as their potential impact on bilateral relations.

Following the interview, the government of Bangladesh lodged a formal protest. The acting Indian High Commissioner in Dhaka was summoned to the Ministry of Foreign Affairs and handed a note of protest. Bangladeshi officials rejected Sarma’s comments as derogatory and misleading, stating that such public remarks on sensitive bilateral issues were unhelpful and could undermine relations between the two countries. They emphasised that any unresolved matters should be addressed through established diplomatic channels and urged Indian political leaders to exercise restraint in future statements.

A day after the diplomatic protest, officials in India distanced the government from his statements, describing them as “individual opinions.” New Delhi stated that Sarma’s views did not represent the position of the Government of India and should not be interpreted as such.

== Awards ==
In September 2023, the Singapore government awarded Himanta Biswa Sarma the prestigious Lee Kuan Yew Exchange Fellowship for his distinguished contribution to public service.

Political offices
Preceded by Sarbananda Sonowal	Chief Minister of Assam; 10 May 2021 – Present	Incumbent
