= Tilok Gogoi =

Indian politician (1923–1985)

Cabinet Minister, Government of Assam
- In office 2 April 1983 – 23 July 1985
- Chief Minister: Hiteswar Saikia

Member of Parliament, Rajya Sabha
- In office 20 July 1977 – 2 April 1980
- Constituency: Assam

Member of Assam Legislative Assembly
- In office 1983 – 23 July 1985
- Preceded by: Devananda Bora
- Succeeded by: Lalit Chandra Rajkhowa
- Constituency: Teok
- In office 1962 – 1972
- Preceded by: Harinarayan Barua
- Succeeded by: Dulal Chandra Khound
- Constituency: Teok

Personal details
- Born: Tilok Chandra Gogoi; 10 April 1923 Teok, Assam Province, British India
- Died: 23 July 1985 (aged 62) London, United Kingdom
- Party: Indian National Congress
- Spouse: Dibyalata Gogoi (m. 1959)
- Children: 5
- Parent: Khageswar Gogoi (Father)
- Education: Cotton College

Tilok Chandra Gogoi (10 April 1923 – 23 July 1985) was an Indian politician and freedom fighter who served as a Member of the Rajya Sabha, representing Assam, from 1977 to 1980, and as a state cabinet minister from 1983 until his death in 1985. A member of the Indian National Congress, he was also the Member of Assam Legislative Assembly (MLA) for Teok from 1962 to 1972 and again from 1983 to 1985.

== Early life and education ==
Tilok Chandra Gogoi was born on 10 April 1923 in the village Selenghat, Bornagayan Gaon in Teok, as the son of Khageswar Gogoi.

Gogoi completed his lower primary education at Baisohabi.

=== Quit India movement ===
While at school in Class X, he joined the Quit India Movement and then was imprisoned at Jorhat jail as a detenu prisoner for over two years from 13 November 1942 to 10 May 1945.

=== Later education ===
After being released from prison, he passed the matriculation exam after completing his higher education at Jhanji. Gogoi then graduated with a Bachelor of Arts (BA) from Cotton College, Guwahati in 1950.

== Early career ==
After graduating from university, Gogoi worked in the P.C.C. Office at Guwahati and then as a teacher in the High English School in Selenghat from 1960 to 1962.

== Later political career ==
Gogoi was the founder of Assam Pradesh Youth Congress in 1954 and was its working president until 1958. He was one of the secretaries at site at the All India Congress Committee (AICC) plenary session held at Guwahati in 1959, and the vice-chairman of the construction and accommodation sub committee at the Jawahar Nagar Congress Session held in 1976. Gogoi also served as the president of the Jorhat district Congress Committee from 1967 to 1972. He was elected vice-president of Assam Pradesh Congress Committee in 1972, and was a member of the board of management at Assam Agricultural University (AAU).

Gogoi served as a Member of the Rajya Sabha from 20 July 1977 to 2 April 1980. He served as the president of Assam Pradesh Congress Committee from 1977 to 1980. After being re-elected to the Assam assembly, he was appointed Minister for Cooperation and Public Enterpises on 2 April 1983 under Chief Minister Hiteswar Saikia. He was later appointed Minister for Food and Civil Supplies. On 2 May 1984, in a cabinet reshuffle, he was appointed Minister for Panchayat, Community Development, and Political Sufferers.

== Personal life ==
Gogoi married Dibyalata Gogoi on 27 September 1959 and together they had two sons and three daughters. He was also an agriculturist in his private life.

== Death ==
Gogoi died, while in office as a cabinet minister, in London at the age of 62 on 23 July 1985. He had travelled to England to undergo treatment for cancer.
