= ATDC =

ATDC may refer to:

- Advanced Technology Development Center, a science and business incubator in Georgia
- Advanced Technology Development Complex, part of Michigan Technological University
- Assam Tourism Development Corporation, a state owned public sector undertaking in India
- after top dead centre, in ignition timing of internal combustion engines
- the ataxia-telangiectasia group D complementing gene
