= Mayur Borgohain =

Indian politician (born 1982)

Mayur Borgohain (born 1982) is an Indian politician from Assam. He is a member of the Assam Legislative Assembly from the Nazira Assembly constituency in Sibsagar district representing the Bharatiya Janata Party.

== Early life ==
Borgohain is from Nazira, Sibsagar district, Assam. He is the son of the late Bipin Borgohain. He completed his Bachelor of Arts in history at Gargaon College, Simaluguri, which is affiliated with Dibrugarh University in 2004. He runs his own business. He declared assets worth Rs.2 crore in his affidavit to the Election Commission of India.

== Career ==
Borgohain won the Nazira Assembly constituency representing the Bharatiya Janata Party in the 2026 Assam Legislative Assembly election. He polled 98,198 votes and defeated his nearest rival, Debabrata Saikia of the Indian National Congress, by a margin of 46,701 votes.
