= Nazira Assembly constituency =

Constituency of the Assam legislative assembly in India

Nazira
- Constituency No. 97 for the Assam Legislative Assembly

Constituency details
- Country: India
- Region: Northeast India
- State: Assam
- District: Sivasagar
- Lok Sabha constituency: Jorhat
- Established: 1951
- Reservation: None

Member of Legislative Assembly
- 16th Assam Legislative Assembly
- Incumbent Mayur Borgohain
- Party: BJP
- Elected year: 2026

Nazira Assembly constituency is one of the 126 assembly constituencies of Assam in India. Nazira is also part of Jorhat Lok Sabha constituency.

== Members of Legislative Assembly ==
| Year | Name | Party |
|---|---|---|
| 1951 | Ananda Chandra Bezbarua | Indian National Congress |
| 1957 | Tankeswar Chetia | Indian National Congress |
| 1962 | Tankeswar Chetia | Indian National Congress |
| 1967 | K.K. Gogoi | Indian National Congress |
| 1972 | Hiteswar Saikia | Indian National Congress |
| 1978 | Hiteswar Saikia | Indian National Congress |
| 1983 | Hiteswar Saikia | Indian National Congress |
| 1985 | Hiteswar Saikia | Indian National Congress |
| 1988^ | Tanu Konwar | Asom Gana Parishad |
| 1991 | Hiteswar Saikia | Indian National Congress |
| 1996 | Hemoprova Saikia | Indian National Congress |
| 2001 | Hemoprova Saikia | Indian National Congress |
| 2006 | Drupad Borgohain | Communist Party of India |
| 2011 | Debabrata Saikia | Indian National Congress |
| 2016 | Debabrata Saikia | Indian National Congress |
| 2021 | Debabrata Saikia | Indian National Congress |
| 2026 | Mayur Borgohain | Bharatiya Janata Party |

★by-election

== Election results ==
=== 2026 ===
2026 Assam Legislative Assembly election: Nazira
| Party | Candidate | Votes | % | ±% |
|---|---|---|---|---|
| BJP | Mayur Borgohain | 98,198 | 62.64 | |
| INC | Debabrata Saikia | 51,497 | 32.85 | |
| CPI | Kanak Gogoi | 2,691 | 1.72 | |
| NOTA | None of the above | 1,735 | 1.11 | |
| Margin of victory | | 46701 | | |
| Turnout | | 156768 | | |
| Rejected ballots | | | | |
| Registered electors | | | | |
| BJP gain from INC | | Swing | | |

=== 2021 ===
2021 Assam Legislative Assembly election: Nazira
| Party | Candidate | Votes | % | ±% |
|---|---|---|---|---|
| INC | Debabrata Saikia | 52,387 | 47.56 | −6.21 |
| BJP | Mayur Borgohain | 51,704 | 46.94 | +8.28 |
| AJP | Ribulaya Gogoi | 2,896 | 2.63 | N/A |
| Independent | Mintu Boruah | 1,061 | 0.96 | N/A |
| AIFB | Horen Borgohain | 640 | 0.58 | N/A |
| NOTA | None of the above | 1,470 | 1.33 | −0.12 |
| Majority | | 683 | 0.62 | −14.49 |
| Turnout | | 1,10,158 | 82.22 | −0.54 |
| Registered electors | | 1,33,974 | | |
| INC hold | | Swing | | |

=== 2016 ===
2016 Assam Legislative Assembly election: Nazira
| Party | Candidate | Votes | % | ±% |
|---|---|---|---|---|
| INC | Debabrata Saikia | 52,869 | 53.77 | −9.63 |
| BJP | Prohlad Gowala | 38,014 | 38.66 | +36.38 |
| CPI | Kanak Gogoi | 4,507 | 4.58 | −18.00 |
| AITC | Ribulaya Gogoi | 1,501 | 1.52 | N/A |
| NOTA | None of the above | 1,430 | 1.45 | N/A |
| Majority | | 14,855 | 15.11 | −25.71 |
| Turnout | | 98,321 | 82.76 | +6.87 |
| Registered electors | | 1,18,794 | | |
| INC hold | | Swing | -23.01 | |

=== 2011 ===
2011 Assam Legislative Assembly election: Nazira
| Party | Candidate | Votes | % | ±% |
|---|---|---|---|---|
| INC | Debabrata Saikia | 52,510 | 63.40 | +19.38 |
| CPI | Drupad Borgohain | 18,700 | 22.58 | −22.04 |
| AGP | Juri Konwar | 5,282 | 6.38 | N/A |
| NCP | Ajit Hazarika | 1,921 | 2.32 | N/A |
| BJP | Syed Abdul Rahim | 1,887 | 2.28 | −3.06 |
| AIUDF | Sofiquddin Ahmed | 1,304 | 1.57 | −1.79 |
| AITC | Hari Krishna Gogoi | 1,223 | 1.48 | N/A |
| Majority | | 33,810 | 40.82 | +40.22 |
| Turnout | | 82,827 | 75.89 | −1.83 |
| INC gain from CPI | | Swing | | |

=== 2006 ===
Assam Legislative Assembly election, 2006: Nazira
| Party | Candidate | Votes | % | ±% |
|---|---|---|---|---|
| CPI | Drupad Borgohain | 37,623 | 44.62 | +31.24 |
| INC | Hemprove Saikia | 37,113 | 44.02 | −24.17 |
| BJP | Alik Burgohain | 4,506 | 5.34 | |
| AIUDF | Tajmot Ali | 2,830 | 3.36 | |
| AGP(P) | Deepak Burgohain | 2,244 | 2.66 | |
| Majority | | 510 | 0.60 | |
| Turnout | | 84,316 | 77.72 | |
| CPI gain from INC | | Swing | | |

== See also ==
- Nazira
- List of constituencies of Assam Legislative Assembly
