= Tarun Ram Phukan =

Indian revolutionary and politician

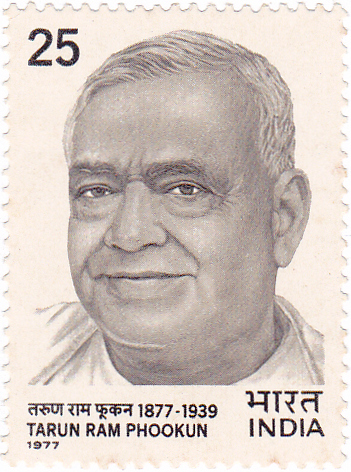
Tarun Ram Phukan on a 1977 stamp of India

Tarun Ram Phukan (also written as Tarun Ram Phookun, 22 January 1877 – 28 July 1939) was a prominent leader of Assam during British colonial rule in India. He was popularly known as Deshbhakta.

== Early life and education ==
Tarun Ram Phukan was born in 1877 in a reputed family of Assam. He was educated in Cotton Collegiate School, Guwahati and Presidency College, Calcutta. Later, he moved to the Bar from Inner Temple in London. He educated as a lawyer but also served as lecturer in Earle Law College in Guwahati.

== Involvement in movement against British rule ==
He was a prominent member of a political organization, then known as the Assam Association, till 1920. Phookan played an important part in forming the Assam Branch of the Indian National Congress in 1921. He was elected as the first President. When the Non-Cooperation Movement was started, Phookan took a leading part in it, and he toured various parts of Assam carrying the message of Mahatma Gandhi. In connection with the Non-Cooperation Movement, he was sentenced to one year's rigorous imprisonment in 1921.

Phookan became the Chairman of the Reception Committee, Pandu Session of the Indian National Congress in 1926. He also served as Chairman of the Municipal Board and Local Board of Guwahati and undertook several programmes for the upliftment of the under-privileged sections of society. He established a Leper Asylum in Guwahati. He was a great orator and also a prominent writer. He served as the President of the Asam Sahitya Sabha, a premier literary organisation in Assam at its Goalpara Session in 1927. He also served as President of the Assam Chhatra Sammelan in 1928. He also bought the first bicycle and the first motor car in Guwahati.

In 1921, Assam Provincial Congress Committee was formed with its headquarters at Guwahati and Kuladhar Chaliha as its president. Phookan became the president. The reconstituted APCC elected Phookan, Gopinath Bordoloi, Bimala Prasad Chaliha, Chandranath Sarmah, Krishna Nath Sarmah, and Kanak Chandra Sarmah as the members of the AICC. This new committee initiated and invited Mahatma Gandhi to Assam in 1921 to propagate the message of non-co-operation amongst the masses. Mahatma Gandhi's visit gave tremendous impetus to the Congress workers to carry out the non-cooperation movement and implement the principles of Swadeshi.

All India Congress Committee session was hosted by the APCC in 1926, at Pandu, Guwahati, which was presided over by S. Srinivasa Iyengar and national leaders like Motilal Nehru, Vallabhbhai Patel, Dr.Rajendra Prasad, Madan Mohan Malaviya, Muhammad Ali, Shaukat Ali, Sarojini Naidu, S. Satyamurti, Abul Kalam Azad and others attended the session.

== Honour and legacy ==
The Government of Assam, in 2021, decided Phukan's death date to be observed as Desh Bhakti Divas every year.

== See also ==
- List of Indian writers
- Assamese literature
- History of Assamese literature
- Culture of Assam
