= Gita Upadhyay =

Indian writer from Assam (1939–2026)

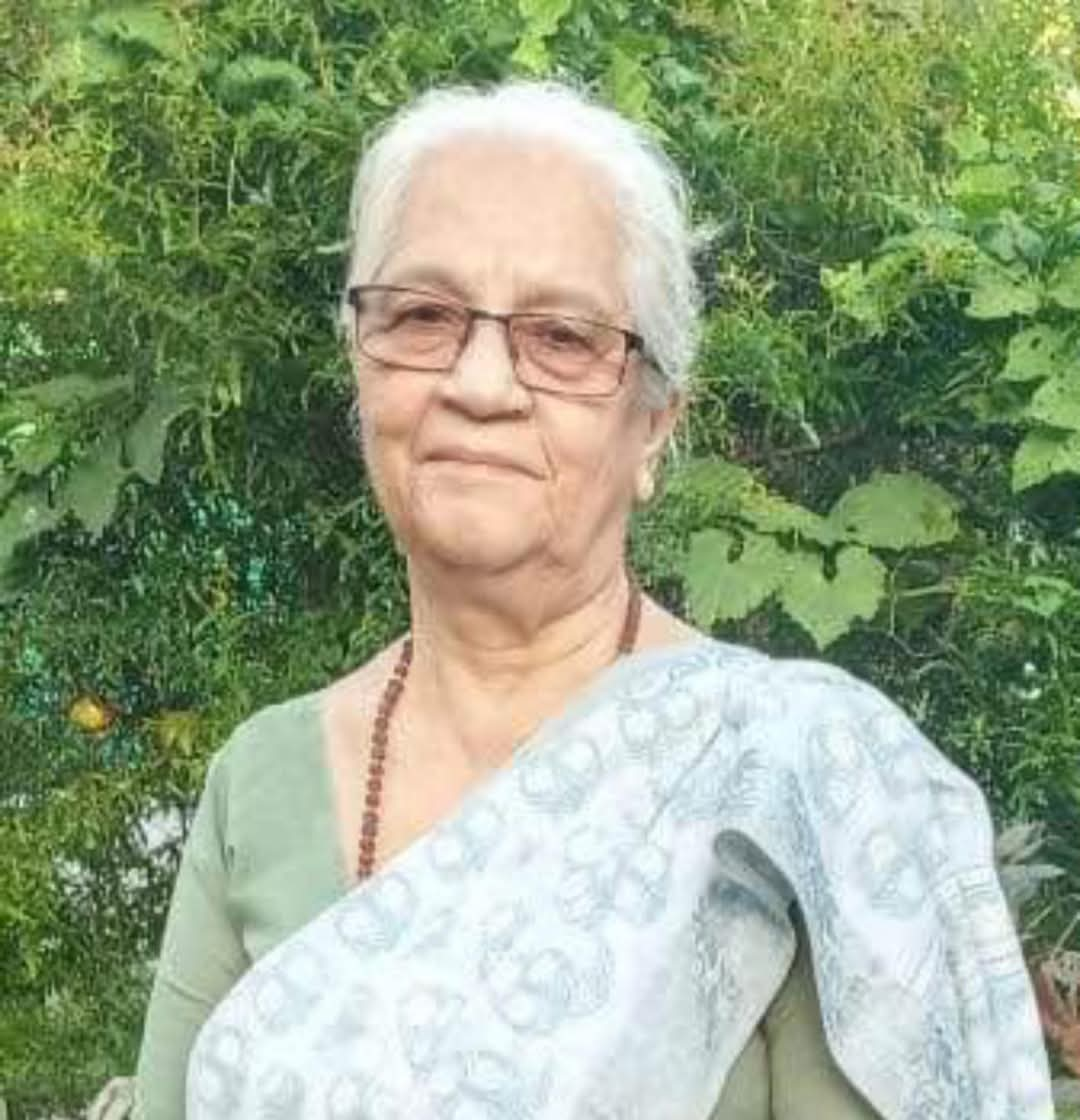
- Born: 14 February 1939; Gangmouthan, Darrang district (now Biswanath district), Assam Province, British India
- Died: 12 July 2026 (aged 87)
- Education: Handique Girls College (BA); Postgraduate degree (Political Science)
- Occupations: Educator; Writer; Translator
- Known for: Contributions to Assamese and Nepali literature; Education
- Notable work: Translation of The Diary of Anne Frank into Nepali and Assamese; Janmabhumi Mero Swadesh (novel); Jiwanlai Pharkera Herda (Autobiography)
- Relatives: Chabilal Upadhyaya (Grandfather); Tankanath Upadhyaya (father) Swarup Upadhyaya, Ex-MP of Tezpur Constituency(Brother) Late Justice Arun Chandra Upadhyaya, Ex-Judge of Gauhati High Court (Brother)
- Awards: Padma Shri (2025); Sahitya Akademi Award (2016)

Gita Upadhyay (14 February 1939 – 12 July 2026) was an Indian educator, writer and translator from Assam. She is known for her contributions to both Assamese and Nepali literature, particularly through translation works aimed at fostering cultural understanding. She was awarded the Padma Shri, India's fourth-highest civilian honour, in 2025 in the field of literature and education. She is noted as the first woman from the Gorkha community of Assam to obtain a post-graduate degree.

== Early life and education ==
Gita Upadhyay was born on 14 February 1939, in the village of Gangmouthan, then part of Darrang district (now Biswanath district) in Assam Province, British India. She is the eldest daughter of Tankanath Upadhyay and Bhagirathi Devi, and the granddaughter of Chabilal Upadhyay, a prominent freedom fighter and the first president of the Assam Pradesh Congress Committee. Her father was a translator and reader.

She began her schooling at Gangmouthan Balika Prathamik Vidyalaya and completed her High School Leaving Certificate (HSLC) from Behali High School in 1955. She pursued higher education in Guwahati, earning a Bachelor of Arts degree from Handique Girls College in 1959. In 1964, she obtained a postgraduate degree in Political Science, becoming the first Gorkha woman from Assam to achieve these academic milestones.

== Career ==
Upadhyay joined Sibsagar College as a lecturer in 1965 after her master's degree. She taught at the institution for thirty-four years, before retiring as the Head of the Political Science Department in 1999. She later served as a member of the Board of Management at Tezpur University. Upadhyay has also been actively involved in social and literary organisations. She has served as the President of Nepali Sahitya Parisad (Assam), Akhil Asom Lekhika Sanstha, and the Assam Branch of the Bharatiya Gorkha Parisangha. Her work, particularly in translation, is recognised for promoting cultural exchange and understanding between linguistic communities.

== Death ==
Upadhyay died on 12 July 2026, at the age of 87.

== Literary works ==
Upadhyay's literary career began alongside her academic profession. She was fluent in both Assamese and Nepali, and has authored and translated around two dozen books. Her work spans genres including poetry, fiction, essays, travelogues, biographies, and children's literature. Her writing often reflects the social, historical, and cultural contexts around her.

Her first published work was a Nepali translation of The Diary of a Young Girl by Anne Frank in 1972. She co-translated the same book into Assamese with Basanti Laskar in 1975. She translated Rupkonwar Jyoti Prasad Agarwala's play Karengor Ligiri from Assamese to Nepali under the title Darbarki Susare. She also translated Nirupama Borgohain's Abhijatri into Nepali. Her notable translations into Assamese include Bhanubhaktar Ramayan (1987) and Lakshmiprasad Devkota's Muna-Madan (2000).

Her Nepali novel Janmabhumi Mero Swadesh, based on the life of her grandfather Chhabilal Upadhyaya, won the Sahitya Akademi Award in 2016. Other original works include the biography Mahapurush Shankardev: Jeevan Ra Karma (2003), the travelogue Mandakini Ra Alakanandako Tiraitir Badri Kedarsamma (2003), and her autobiography Jiwanlai Pharkera Herda (2018).

=== Selected works ===
- The Diary of a Young Girl (Nepali translation, 1972)
- The Diary of a Young Girl (Assamese co-translation with Basanti Laskar, 1975)
- Aamaa Ma First Bhayen (Children's novel, 1997)
- Mahapurush Shankardev: Jeevan Ra Karma (Biography, 2003)
- Mandakini Ra Alakanandako Tiraitir Badri Kedarsamma (Travelogue, 2003)
- Kathanjali (Collection of short stories, 2005)
- Janmabhumi Mero Swadesh (Novel, 2013)
- Jiwanlai Pharkera Herda (Autobiography, 2018)

== Awards and recognition ==
- Padma Shri (2025)—awarded by the President of India for Literature and Education
- Padma Prasad Dhungana Award (2001)
- Literary Pension by the Government of Assam (2003)
- Parijat Miteri Samman (2007)
- Sahitya Akademi Translation Prize (2012)—for translating Karengor Ligiri into Nepali as Darbarki Susare
- Sahitya Akademi Award (2016)—for her novel

== See also ==
- List of Padma Shri award recipients (2020–2029)
- List of Indian writers
- Assamese literature
- History of Assamese literature
