= Membor Gogoi =

Indian politician

Member of Assam Legislative Assembly
- In office 2001–2016
- Preceded by: Renupoma Rajkhowa
- Succeeded by: Renupoma Rajkhowa
- Constituency: Teok

Personal details
- Born: 1 October 1937
- Died: 16 December 2016 (aged 79) Jorhat
- Party: Indian National Congress
- Spouse: Aimoni Gogoi (m. 1965, died)
- Children: 3
- Parent: Thanuram Gogoi (Father) Mehmala Gogoi (Mother)
- Relatives: Hiteswar Saikia (brother in law)
- Occupation: Politician

Membor Gogoi (1 October 1937 - 16 December 2016) was an Indian National Congress politician from Assam. He was a 3-time Member of the Assam Legislative Assembly for Teok from 2001 to 2016. He also contested the Teok seat in 1991 and 1996 but lost to the current MLA for Teok, Renupoma Rajkhowa. He was the brother-in-law of Chief Minister Hiteswar Saikia.

== Early life ==
Gogoi was born on 1 October 1937 to the late Jhanuram Gogoi and the late Mehmala Gogoi. He had a B.E.E.

== Political career ==
Prior to his joining the Congress in 1988, Gogoi was working as a superintending engineer in Assam State Electricity Board (ASEB). Gogoi was the 1991 Indian National Congress candidate for MLA for Teok. He lost to Renupoma Rajkhowa by 1550 votes. He was again the Indian National Congress choice for MLA for Teok in 1996 but he again lost to Renupoma Rajkhowa by 5540 votes. However, in 2001 he defeated Renupoma Rajkhowa by 15834 votes and he again defeated her in 2011. He did not contest in 2016 due to ill-health so his daughter in law, Pallabi Gogoi, contested as Indian National Congress candidate but she lost the polls to Renupoma Rajkhowa.

== Personal life ==
Gogoi was married to Aimoni Gogoi (née Saikia) on 11 May 1965. His wife was the daughter of Haladhar Saikia (1896-1988) and sister of Hiteswar Saikia. She was also a famed Bihu dancer. Together they had 3 sons. His son Deba Jyoti Gogoi married Pallabi Gogoi who contested the Teok seat in 2016 but lost. Membor Gogoi was President of Tai-Ahom Sanskrity Sangraikhyan & Siksa Bikash Committee Jorhat from 1983 to last part of 1988. He was also chairperson of the State agricultural marketing board. His wife predeceased him.

== Death and tributes ==
On 16 December 2016, Gogoi died aged 79 following old-age ailments. Several politicians including Chief Minister Sarbananda Sonowal, former chief minister Tarun Gogoi, MLA Abdul Khaleque and Assam Pradesh Congress Committee President Ripun Bora all offered condolences and tributes on twitter.

The Chairman in-charge, members, officers and staff of the Assam Public Service Commission expressed their deep sorrow at the death of Gogoi, who was a former member of the APSC. They conveyed their heartfelt sympathies to the bereaved family and prayed for eternal peace of his departed soul. A condolence meeting for Gogoi was later held. Several politicians, such as former Chief Minister Tarun Gogoi and Ripun Bora, paid tribute to him. Tarun Gogoi said that member Gogoi "rendered selfless service to the people" and that "the party lost a sincere, honest and hardworking member."
