= Neel Pawan Baruah =

Indian painter (1936–2022)

Neel Pawan Baruah নীলপৱন বৰুৱা
- Born: 1 June 1936; Teok in Jorhat district, Assam
- Died: 28 October 2022 (aged 86); Guwahati, India
- Occupation: Painter
- Known for: Paintings
- Spouse: Dipali Barthakur
- Parent(s): Binanda Chandra Barua; Lavanya Prabha Barua
- Awards: Assam Saurabh, 2021

Neel Pawan Baruah (also spelt Nilpawan Baruah; 1 June 1936 – 28 October 2022) was an Indian painter from Assam. In 2021, he was awarded the Assam Saurabh Award, the second-highest civilian honor of Assam by the Government of Assam. Some of his notable paintings include Green Bird, Kaliya Daman, Shankhachakra Gadapadma, Sleeping Man, Victory of Vietnam, Scream, Three Powers, Patchitra and The Three Faces of the Godde.

== Early life and education ==
Baruah was born on 1 June 1936, in Tamulisiga village near Teok in Jorhat district, Assam. His father was Binanda Chandra Barua and his mother was Lavanya Prabha Barua. He started his education at Dulia Gaon Primary School No. 54, Teok. He attended Teok High School, Jorhat Polytechnic School, Mariani High School and Kamrup Academy in Guwahati. After passing the high school examination several times, he did not pursue a college education to concentrate on agriculture and social work.

He was inspired by the book by Pramathanath Basu and came to Calcutta to study at Shantiniketan. Initially, he wanted to study agriculture but became attracted to painting after seeing the paintings and teaching classes at Shantiniketan. He joined Shantiniketan in 1961. After completing his painting studies at Shantiniketan, he studied glazed pottery at Sriniketan. He later studied painting at the Garhi Studios in New Delhi.

== Work ==
In 1966, Neel Pawan Baruah came to Assam from Calcutta and joined the Guwahati Art College as a teacher. In 1969, he became involved in artwork in collaboration with the archaeological department at Srisurya Hills in Mornai. He asked the Government of Assam for a piece of land to open a film archive on a hill in Sonapur area. He also sought sponsors to paint a 180-foot-long mural called 'Vrindavani Prachir'.

In 1971, he founded the Assam Charu-Karu Kala Parishad and the first private art school in Assam, Basundhara Kala Niketan. Since then, he has been involved in painting. His paintings have been exhibited at the Birla Academy of Art and Culture, Calcutta, Lucknow Fine Arts Academy, Bhubaneswar and other places. His paintings represented Assam at the Lalit Kala Academy, Delhi.

In 1982, he opened a folk art center called Lokkala and conducted three-month workshops on folk art and Vaishnava mask art of Assam under this center. The workshop was attended by mask artists from Majuli.

Baruah worked to revive the weaving industry of Vrindavani vastra and created designs based on Vrindavani textiles. Baruah has created a special style by painting miniature paintings on Charminar cigarette boxes and matchboxes. He mentioned that he started painting cigarette boxes in the 1960s and 1970s when smoking became his habit.

Baruah was involved in various organizations during his lifetime. He began his active public life in 1945 through the Jaihind Chhatra Sansad. In 1991, he inaugurated the Dudhanai Session of the Assam Sahitya Sabha Book Fair and Exhibition. He was the president of the Artists and Literary Assistance Trust of the Sadao Assam Chhatra Sanstha and the representative of Assam at the Academy of Fine Arts in New Delhi. The All India Artists Camp was organized by the Lalit Kala Academy at Srimanta Sankardev Kalakshetra and conducted by Baruah.

== Personal life and death ==
In 1976, he married Dipali Barthakur, a singer. After her marriage, he took care of Dipali Barthakur until her death.

On 5 June 2021, he was diagnosed with COVID-19. At 86, he died on 28 October 2022, at the Gauhati Medical College and Hospital. The Governor of Assam, Jagdish Mukhi expressed his condolence and said, It is a sad day for Assam as the state has lost one of its most celebrated painters.

Political leaders from various parties, including Bimal Bora, the culture minister of Assam and artists, paid their tribute to him. His last rites were performed at Nabagraha crematorium in Guwahati with state honour.

== Awards and recognition ==
The state government of Assam awarded him the Silpi Pension in 1989. He was honoured with the Bishu Rabha Award in 2005 and the Rabindra Jayanti Silpi Sanman in 2008. In 2018, he received an honorary PhD from Gauhati University. The Government of Assam honoured him with the Assam Saurav, the second highest civilian award of the state.
