= Lalit Chandra Rajkhowa =

Indian politician

Member of Assam Legislative Assembly
- In office 1985 - 1991
- Preceded by: Tilok Gogoi
- Succeeded by: Renupoma Rajkhowa
- Constituency: Teok

Personal details
- Spouse: Renupoma Rajkhowa

Lalit Chandra Rajkhowa was an Indian politician from Assam. He was a member of Assam Legislative Assembly for Teok, elected in 1985. He was married to the current Member of Assam Legislative Assembly for Teok, Renupoma Rajkhowa.
