= Nazira =

Oil City in Assam, India

- City
- Nazira
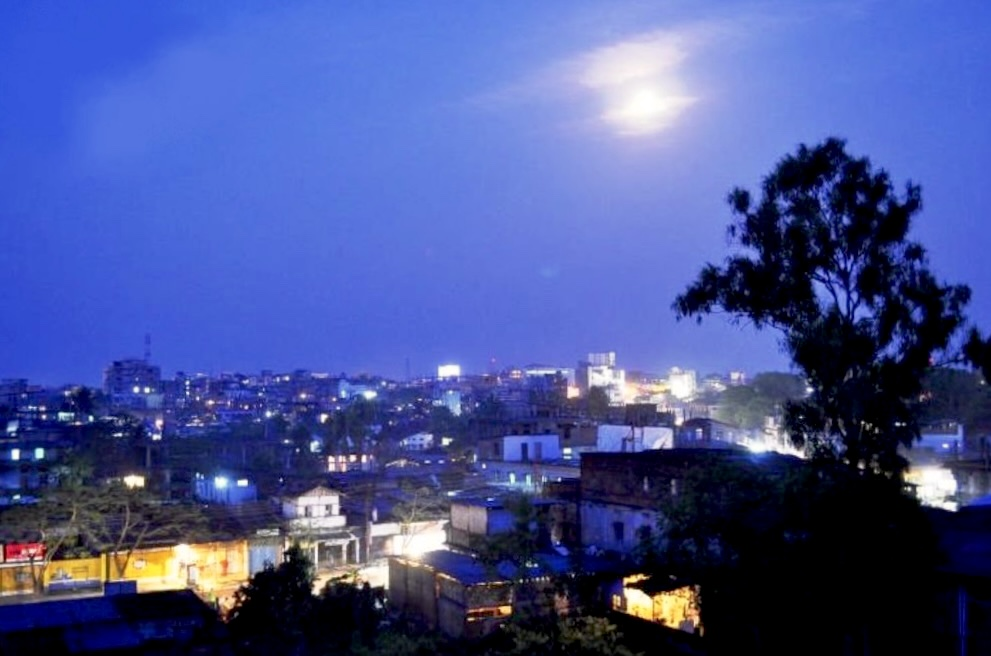
- Nazira Night View

- Location in Assam, India Nazira (India)
- Country: India
- State: Assam
- District: Sivasagar

Government
  - Body: Nazira Municipal Board

Area
  - Total: 23 km^{2} (8.9 sq mi)
- Elevation: 132 m (433 ft)

Population (2025)
  - Total: 84,706

Languages
  - Official: Assamese
- Time zone: UTC+5:30 (IST)
- Postal code: 785685
- Vehicle registration: AS

Nazira (Assamese pronunciation: [naziɹa]) is a city and a municipal board in Sivasagar district in the Indian state of Assam.

== History ==
Nazira was an important place in the Ahom Kingdom. Nearby Gargaon was the capital of the kingdom over a long period. According to tradition, Nazira got its name from "Now-Jeera", which in Assamese means resting place of boats. The historian Sarbananda Rajkumar states, however, that nazira is a Tai Ahom word: na means "land", zi "inclined" and ra "much". Therefore nazira means a "much inclined land". He also writes that once the important places of Nazira were Ganak Village and Nazirahat.

Being in the vicinity of the Dikhow River and the capital of Ahom kingdom Gargaon, it is said that boats used to rest in this place after their long journey through the river. The Kareng Ghar a palace from the Medieval period build by King Rajeshwar Singha, a ruler of the Ahom kingdom stands as a testimony of the bygone era. During the British rule, tea plantations were started in and around Nazira like the other parts of upper Assam. The present day officer's club of Oil and Natural Gas Corporation limited (ONGCL) was in fact a tea planter's club established in 1939. Nazira was the headquarters of famous Assam Tea Company. An account of Life in and around Nazira during the 1940s to 1960s by European tea planters can be found here.

John White Masters, as Superintendent of the Assam Company went to Assam in June 1839 and took up residence at Nazira. He made it the company's headquarters. An old British graveyard lies inside ONGC Colony in Nazira town. Here there are about 62 graves that can be traced according to the list given by H. A. Antrobus. The buried include the historian William Robinson, the author of A Grammar of Assamese Language (1839) and A Descriptive Account Of Assam: With a Sketch of the Local Geography, and a Concise History of the Tea-Plant of Assam. (1841).

William Robinson mastered the Mising language, and the Dafla language too: he wrote Notes on the Daflas and the Peculiarities of Their Language. He made the first attempt at a grammar of the Mising language for institutional use, with his A short outline of Miri (Mising) grammar published in the March issue of Journal of the Asiatic Society of Bengal, in 1849. (Vol, 18, part 1, page 224).

The Gorokihiya Temple, at Namati of Ahom days is 3 km from Nazira. History says that Ahom King Pratap Singha (1603–41) was a devotee of God Siva before he took his throne and he worshipped a Siva Linga. After he got his throne as a King he removed the Siva Linga and established it on the bank of Dikhow River just opposite to Gargaon in a temple which was called as Maidol. This temple is also known as Maheswara Ghar or house or God Siva. Charaideu is just 16 km from Nazira Town. Here tourist can see the very sacred earthen pyramids (Tombs) of Ahom Kings, families and other ministers. During World War II (1939–1945) also Nazira had played an important rule in China Burma India Theatre. The OSS Detachment 101 established a base camp under the guise of a centre for malarial research at a tea plantation near Nazira. Detachment 101's training camp was located at Nazira (ost probably in the present Guest House, ONGCL Colony, Nazira).

== Geography ==
Nazira is located at 26.92°N 94.73°E. It has an average elevation of 132 metres (433 feet).

== Demographics ==
As of 2011 India census, Nazira had a population of 13,304. Males constitute 53% of the population and females 47%. Nazira has a literacy rate of 92.58%, higher than the national average: male literacy is 94.94%, and female literacy is 90.03%. In Nazira, 9.62% of the population is under 6 years of age. Nazira is mainly inhabited by Ahoms followed by the Assamese Muslims, Brahmins, Chutias, Koch, Kalitas, Deoris and tea tribes constitute the rest of the portion of the demographic chart. Besides Nazira also has a sizeable population from the tea tribes community, who were brought as labours from central India by British for Tea plantations. 76.69% of population are Hindus and 22.23% are Muslims. Remaining 1.08% belong to other religions.

== Politics ==
Nazira is part of Jorhat (Lok Sabha constituency).

List of MLA

- 1946: Sanu Kheria
- 1951: Ananda Chandra Bezbarua, Indian National Congress
- 1957: Tankeswar Chetia, Indian National Congress
- 1962: Tankeswar Chetia, Indian National Congress
- 1967: K.K. Gogoi, Indian National Congress
- 1972: Hiteswar Saikia, Indian National Congress
- 1978: Hiteswar Saikia, Indian National Congress
- 1983: Hiteswar Saikia, Indian National Congress
- 1985: Hiteswar Saikia, Indian National Congress
- 1988 (by polls): Tanu Konwar, Asom Gana Parishad
- 1991: Hiteswar Saikia, Indian National Congress
- 1996: Hemprove Saikia, Indian National Congress
- 2001: Hemprove Saikia, Indian National Congress
- 2006: Drupad Borgohain, Communist Party of India
- 2011: Debabrata Saikia, Indian National Congress
- 2016: Debabrata Saikia, Indian National Congress
- 2026: Mayur Borgohain, Bharatiya Janata Party
