= Drupad Borgohain =

Indian politician (1941–2019)

Member of Parliament, Rajya Sabha
- In office 3 April 1998 to 2 April 2004
- Constituency: Assam

Personal details
- Born: 7 November 1941 Sivasagar, Assam, India
- Died: 10 April 2019 (aged 77)
- Party: Communist Party of India
- Education: Sivasagar College
- Occupation: Politician

Drupad Borgohain (7 November 1941 – 10 April 2019) was an Indian politician, and a veteran left-wing leader in the Assam state. As of 2014 he was the secretary of the Assam State Council of the Communist Party of India (CPI), a position he held since 1987. As of 2010 he served as president of Assam state council of All India Kisan Sabha (peasants' movement).

== Early life ==
Drupad Borgohain was born on 7 November 1941 (anniversary of the October Revolution). He lived in Maduri village, Sivasagar district. He was the son of Manik Chandra Borgohain and Rupeswari Borgohain. He studied at Nazira High School and Sivasagar College. He obtained a B.A. (Hons.) degree. A teacher by profession, he worked at the Maduri Middle Vernacular School during 1960–1961. He went on to teach at the Chakimukh Middle English School between October 1961 and January 1963, and then at Nazira Higher Secondary Multi Purpose School from 1 February 1963 until 31 December 1982.

== Youth movement ==
He became a CPI party member in April 1963. He was active in the All India Youth Federation between 1965 and 1978, being elected to its National Council. He served as Joint Secretary of the Assam State Council of AIYF between 1965 and 1968, then becoming the president of the Assam State Council.

== Party whole-timer ==
Borgohain resigned from his teaching job to become a political whole-timer in 1982. He stood as the CPI candidate in the Nazira seat in the 1983 Assam Legislative Assembly election. He finished in second place with 2,460 votes (18.83% of the votes in the constituency), being defeated by Hiteswar Saikia of the Indian National Congress.

== Parliamentarian and State Legislator ==
Borgohain was a member of the Rajya Sabha (upper house of the Parliament of India) between April 1998 and April 2004. He stood as a candidate in the Jorhat Lok Sabha seat in the 2004 general election. Borgohain finished in second place with 172,332 votes (25.84% of the votes in the constituency).

Borgohain contested the 2006 Assam Legislative Assembly election. He won the Nazira seat, defeating the Congress Party candidate Hemoprova Saikia a Handloom and Textiles Minister of the state government. Borgohain obtained 37,623 votes (44.62%).

Borgohain again contested the Jorhat seat in the 2009 general election. He finished in third place with 74,185 votes (9.72%). He obtained 22.21% of the votes in the Nazira assembly segment, but merely 3.8% of the votes in the Jorhat assembly segment. Borgohain lost the Nazira assembly seat in the 2011 election. He finished in second place with 18,700 votes (22.58), being defeated by Debabrata Saikia of the Congress Party.

== 2014 election ==
CPI launched Borgohain as its candidate in the Jorhat seat in the 2014 Lok Sabha election. His candidature received support from the Communist Party of India.
