= Gargaon College =

College in Assam

- Type: Public
- Established: 1959; 67 years ago
- Founders: Tanu Konwar
- Affiliations: Dibrugarh University
- Principal: Dr Sabyasachi Mahanta
- Location: Simaluguri, Sibsagar district, Assam, India
- Website: gargaoncollege.ac.in

Gargaon College, established in 1959, is a general degree college situated at Simaluguri, in Sibsagar district, Assam. It is affiliated with Dibrugarh University.

== Activities ==
The college holds a debating competition every year on its foundation day, September 7th in memory of its first regular principal Tanu Konwar. Every year the college conducts general election among the students to form the Gargaon College Students' Union. The Students' Union organises annual sports and the Literary and Cultural Week of the college annually. The college has a NSS volunteer unit. Gargayan is the annual magazine of the college.

== Departments ==
=== Science ===
- Physics
- Mathematics
- Chemistry
- Statistics
- Geology
- Botany
- Zoology

=== Arts and Commerce ===
- Assamese
- English
- History
- Education
- Economics
- Rural Development
- Political Science
- Sociology
- Geography
- Commerce
