= Assam Tourism Development Corporation =

Assam Tourism Development Corporation অসম পৰ্যটন উন্নয়ন নিগম
- Awesome Assam Campaign launched on 4th Sept. 2016
- Company type: Government of Assam undertaking
- Industry: Tourism, ecotourism, hotel management
- Founded: 9 June 1988
- Headquarters: Paryatan Bhawan, Paltan Bazaar, Guwahati, India
- Area served: Assam, India
- Services: Tourism sector
- Website: Assam Tourism Development Corporation

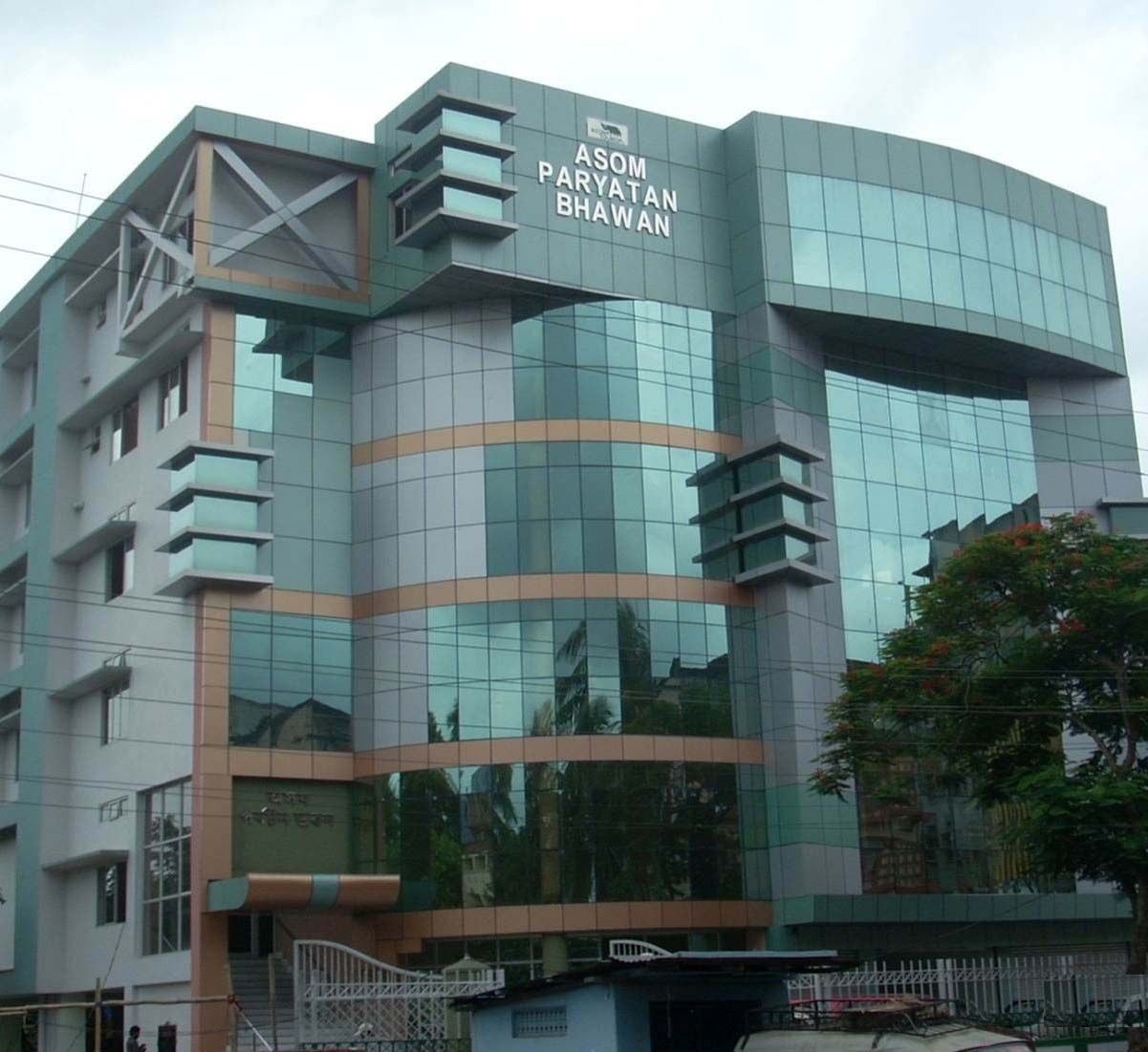
The headquarters of ATDC Ltd.

Assam Tourism Development Corporation or ATDC (Assamese: অসম পৰ্যটন উন্নয়ন নিগম) is a state owned corporation of Assam, India. It deals with tourism services and development as a part of the Assam Tourism Department along with the Directorate of Tourism. The State Govt. of Assam set up the corporation on 9 June 1988. The ATDC is headquartered at Guwahati (26.1780427°N 91.7495255°E) and has district offices across Assam. Its official slogan is "Awesome Assam."

== Chairpersons ==
List of Chairpersons of Assam Tourism Development Corporation
Name	Portrait	Chief Minister	Appointment date	Retirement date
Shri Bhrigu Kr. Phukan		Prafulla Kumar Mahanta	24 December 1988	27 January 1990
Shri Girindra Kr. Baruah		Prafulla Kumar Mahanta	27 January 1990	27 November 1990
Shri L.P. Gupta, IAS		Hiteswar Saikia	3 April 1991	6 September 1991
Mrs. Syeda Anwara Taimur		Hiteswar Saikia	6 September 1991	4 June 1993
Shri Prafulla Kr. Mahanta	Prafulla Kumar Mahanta	Prafulla Kumar Mahanta	28 March 1996	19 December 1998
Shri Jagadish Ch. Bhuyan		Prafulla Kumar Mahanta	19 December 1998	20 April 2001
Dr. Surajit Mitra, IAS		Tarun Gogoi	20 April 2001	24 April 2002
Smti Emily Choudhury, IAS		Tarun Gogoi	24 April 2002	12 August 2002
Smti Ajanta Neog	Ajanta Neog	Tarun Gogoi	12 August 2002	30 September 2003
Shri Ajit Singh		Tarun Gogoi	30 September 2003	10 March 2006
Dr. (Mrs.) Hemo Prabha Saikia		Tarun Gogoi	10 March 2006	3 August 2016
Shri V.S.Bhaskar, IAS		Sarbananda Sonowal	3 August 2016	14 May 2017
Shri Jayanta Malla Baruah	Jayanta Malla Baruah	Sarbananda Sonowal	14 May 2017	8 March 2021
Shri Rituparna Baruah	Rituparna Baruah	Himanta Biswa Sarma	8 November 2021	Incumbent

== History of tourism in Assam ==
Once, this northeastern state of India was known as Pragjyotishpura, then Kamrupa. During Ahom rule the land was called Axom, which foreigners pronounced "Assam". Assam was ruled by many kingdoms from ancient times. In 1826, British took over Assam and made it a separate state. From ancient times, tourists have come to this land. The Chinese traveler Xuanzang visited Kamrupa during Bhaskarvarman in the 7th century.

In 1958, the Department of Tourism was established. In 1962, an information office opened in Kaziranga, and in 1965, an information office opened in Sivasagar.

In 1987 (during the seventh Five Year Plan), the first ever tourism policy of Assam was notified and subsequently ATDC was formed with a paid up capital of 2.4 million Indian rupees. In the same year the state government declared tourism as an industry.

In the mid-70s, Assam tourism started properties near Kaziranga and other places such as Aranya, Banani, Banashree, MV and Jolporee. After the creation of ATDC, some of them were handed over to ATDC to operate. From the beginning, ATDC created many tourist lodges, yatriniwas, parks, and wayside amenities with the brand name of "Prashaanti". In 2009, a "tourist arrival cum reception center" was opened in Guwahati, which is presently known as "Asom Paryatan Bhawan". In 2012, ATDC started a luxury cruise, MV Mahabaahu, in a joint venture.

In 1995 the Restricted Area Permit (RAP) from Assam was withdrawn which had been imposed in 1962 after the Sino-Indian War.

== Properties ==
Assam tourism has more than 50 properties including lodges, wayside amenities, restaurants, parks, rope ways, amusement parks, and cruises in locations across Assam. Out of these, the Directorate of Tourism runs eight lodges. ATDC operates directly seven lodges, and other properties are on lease to private parties.

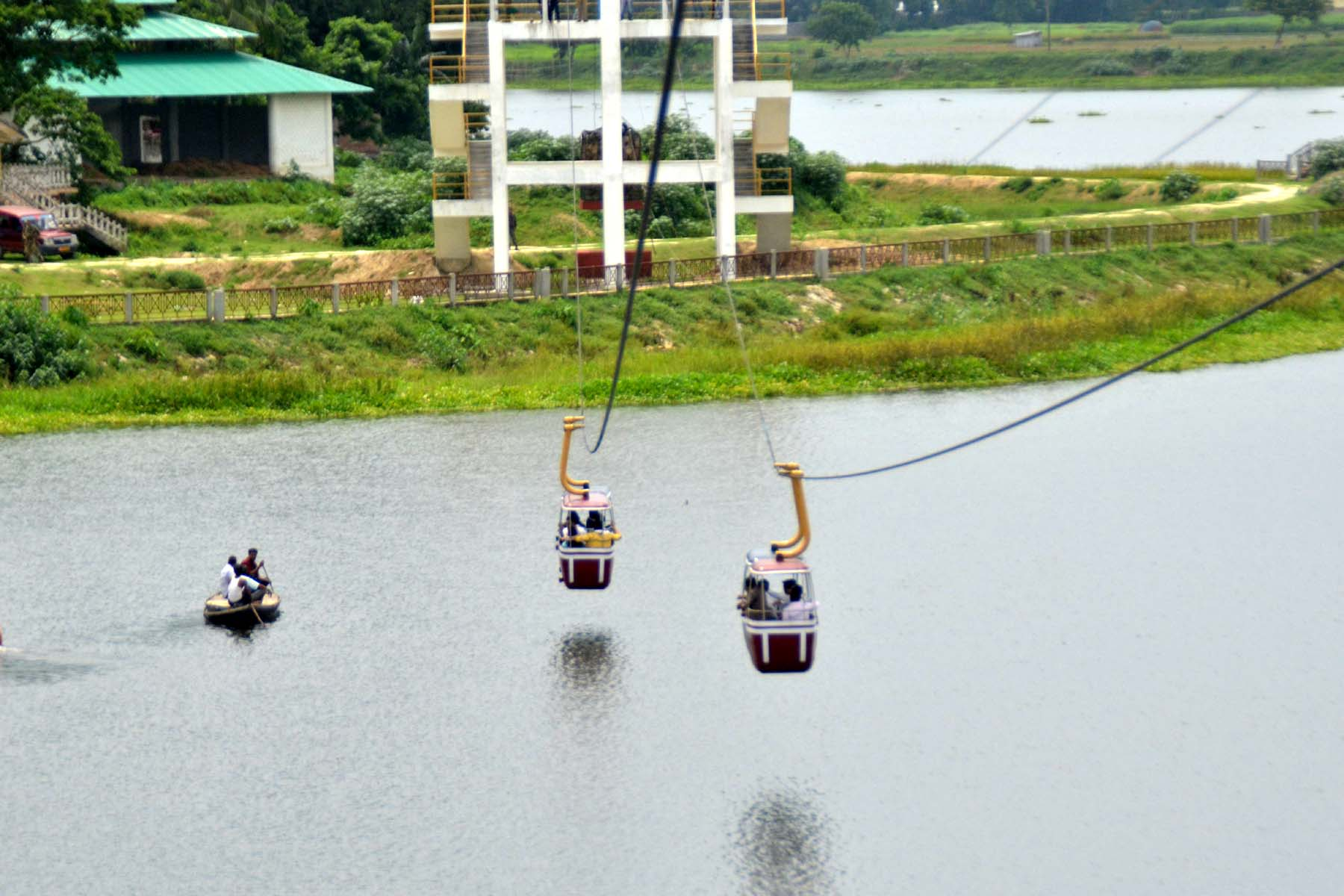
Ropeway at Samaguri Lake, Nagaon, Assam, India

Properties near Kaziranga National Park of Golaghat and Nagaon districts include:

- Aranya Tourist Lodge
- Kaziranga Tourist Lodge (Banani, Bonoshree, Kunjabon under DOT)
- Jupurighar camping site
- Jonaki Kareng (reception center)
- Prashaanti Cottage
- Rhinorica (wayside amenity)
- GL Resort, Jakhalabanda (wayside amenity)
- Triptir Ehaj, Amoni (wayside amenity)
- Tanz Water Sports (Kaliabhumora Recreational Park)
- Down Town Resort
- Samaguri Lake Tourism Project

Prashaanti Lodges and tourist complexes of other places include:

- Barpeta
- Barpeta Road
- Bhalukpong
- Digboi
- Golaghat
- Goramur, Majuli
- Guwahati
- Kamakhya
- Nalbari
- Pobitara
- Silchar
- Sivasagar (DOT)
- Tezpur
- Tinsukia

More than 15 parks and restaurants across Assam run under ATDC on lease.

Red River Tours & Travels is its travel wing, which operates customized and conducted tours, such as Kaziranga tours, city tours, and pilgrimage tours.

== See also ==
- Tourism in Assam
- Tourism in Kaziranga National Park
