= Assam Pradesh Congress Committee =

- President: Gaurav Gogoi
- Chairman: Wazed Ali Choudhury
- Headquarters: Rajiv Bhawan, GS Road, Guwahati, Assam
- Student wing: National Students' Union of India
- Youth wing: Indian Youth Congress
- Women's wing: All India Mahila Congress
- Ideology: Liberalism (Indian)
- Political position: Centre
- ECI status: A State Unit of Indian National Congress
- Alliance: Indian National Developmental Inclusive Alliance; United Opposition Forum
- Seats in Rajya Sabha: 0 / 7
- Seats in Lok Sabha: 2 / 14
- Seats in Assam Legislative Assembly: 19 / 126

Election symbol

Website
- apcc.assam.org

Assam Pradesh Congress Committee (or APCC) was formed in June 1921. Its headquarters is at Rajiv Bhavan in GS Road, Guwahati.

Kuladhar Chaliha was the first elected president and Chabilal Upadhyaya the first selected president of the committee when it was founded.

Bhupen Kumar Borah was appointed the new president on 24 July 2021 replacing Ripun Bora.

On 26 May 2025, almost a year before Assam Legislative Assembly elections, Gaurav Gogoi was appointed president of Assam Congress, replacing Bhupen Kumar Borah.

== Structure & composition ==
S.no	Name	Designation
1.	Bhupesh Baghel	AICC Incharge
2.	Gaurav Gogoi	President; Assam Pradesh Congress Committee
3.	Jakir Hussain Sikdar	Working President; Assam Pradesh Congress Committee
4.	Zubair Anam	President; Assam Pradesh Youth Congress
5.	Mira Borthakur Goswami	President; Assam Pradesh Mahila Congress
6.	Rahul Hazarika	General Secretary; Assam Pradesh Youth Congress
7.	Rakesh Chakravorty	Vice President; Assam Pradesh Youth Congress
7.	Rakesh Chakravorty	Spoksperson; Assam Pradesh Congress Committee
8.	Deep Bayan	President; Assam Pradesh Congress Seva Dal
9.	Salman Khan	Chairman; Minority Department, Assam Pradesh Congress Committee
10.	Kaushik Kashyap	President; Assam State NSUI
11.		Chairman; SM and IT Department, Assam Pradesh Congress Committee

== List of INC Presidents from Assam ==
S.no	President	Portrait	Place of Conference	Term	
1.	Dev Kant Baruah		Chandigarh	1975	1977

== List of APCC Presidents ==
S.no	President	Portrait	Term	
	Chabilal Upadhyaya		1921	1921
	Kuladhar Chaliha		1921	
	Tarun Ram Phukan			
	Bishnuram Medhi		1930	1940
	Maulana Mohammad Tayyebulla		1940	1948
	Sriman Prafulla Goswami		1961	
	Jogendra Nath Hazarika		1969	
1.	Bijoy Chandra Bhagavati		1967	1971
2.	Dharanidhar Das		1981	1982
3.	Harendra Nath Talukdar		1982	1983
4.	Dharanidhar Basumatari		1983	1986
5.	Tarun Gogoi		1986	1990
6.	Hiteswar Saikia		1990	1992
7.	Nakul Das		1993	1996
(6).	Hiteswar Saikia		1996	1996
(5).	Tarun Gogoi		1996	2002
8.	Paban Singh Ghatowar		2002	2004
9.	Bhubaneswar Kalita	Kalita in Left side	2004	2014
10.	Anjan Dutta		13 December 2014	16 June 2016
11.	Ripun Bora		24 August 2016	24 July 2021
12.	Bhupen Kumar Borah		24 July 2021	26 May 2025
13.	Gaurav Gogoi		26 May 2025	Incumbent

== List of Leaders of Opposition ==
S.no	Name	Portrait
1.	Gopinath Bordoloi	
2.	Golok Rajbanshi	
3.	Debabrata Saikia	

== Legislative Party Leaders ==
Year	CLP Leader	Deputy Leader
1937	Gopinath Bordoloi	
1946	Gopinath Bordoloi	
1946	Bishnuram Medhi	
1952	Bishnuram Medhi	
1957	Bimala Prasad Chaliha	
1962	Bimala Prasad Chaliha	
1967	Bimala Prasad Chaliha	
1967	Mahendra Mohan Choudhry	
1972	Sarat Chandra Sinha	
1978	Sarat Chandra Sinha	
1978	Anwara Taimur	
1978	Keshab Chandra Gogoi	
1983	Hiteswar Saikia	
1985	Golok Rajbanshi	
1991	Hiteswar Saikia	
1996	Bhumidhar Barman	
2001	Tarun Gogoi	
2006	Tarun Gogoi	
2011	Tarun Gogoi	
2016	Debabrata Saikia	Rakibul Hussain
2021	Debabrata Saikia	Rakibul Hussain
2026	Wazed Ali Choudhury	Joy Prakash Das

== Assam Legislative Assembly election ==
Year	Legislature	Party leader	Portrait of Leader	Seats Contested	Seats won	Change in seats	Votes	Percentage of votes	Vote swing	Outcome
1952	1st Assembly	Bishnu Ram Medhi		92	76 / 105	▲ new	10,64,850	43.48	▲ new	Government
1957	2nd Assembly	Bishnu Ram Medhi		101	71 / 108	▼5	13,21,367	52.35	▲8.87	Government
1962	3rd Assembly	Bimala Prasad Chaliha		103	79 / 105	▲8	11,79,305	48.25	▼4.1	Government
1967	4th Assembly	Bimala Prasad Chaliha		120	73 / 126	▼6	13,54,748	43.60	▼4.65	Government
1972	5th Assembly	Sarat Chandra Sinha		114	95 / 126	▲22	19,76,209	53.20	▲9.6	Government
1978	6th Assembly	Sarat Chandra Sinha		126	26 / 126	▼69	12,20,189	23.62	▼29.58	Opposition
1983	7th Assembly	Hiteswar Saikia		109	91 / 109	▲65	11,94,657	52.53	▲28.91	Government
1985	8th Assembly	Hiteswar Saikia		125	26 / 126	▼66	17,24,003	23.23	▼29.3	Opposition
1991	9th Assembly	Hiteswar Saikia		125	66 / 126	▲40	24,55,302	29.35	▲6.12	Government
1996	10th Assembly	Bhumidhar Barman		122	34 / 122	▼32	27,78,627	30.56	▲1.21	Opposition
2001	11th Assembly	Tarun Gogoi		126	71 / 126	▲39	42,30,676	39.75	▲9.19	Government
2006	12th Assembly	Tarun Gogoi		120	53 / 126	▼18	41,02,479	31.08	▼8.67	Government
2011	13th Assembly	Tarun Gogoi		126	78 / 126	▲25	54,43,781	39.39	▲8.31	Government
2016	14th Assembly	Tarun Gogoi		122	26 / 126	▼52	52,38,655	30.96	▼8.43	Opposition
2021	15th Assembly	Debabrata Saikia		95	29 / 126	▲3	57,03,341	29.67	▼1.29	Opposition
2026	16th Assembly	Gaurav Gogoi		99	19 / 126	▼10	64,64,216	29.84	▲0.17	Opposition

Assam Congress Legislative Assembly seat count

== List of Chief Ministers of Assam from Indian National Congress ==
S.no	Name	Portrait	Term		
1.	Gopinath Bordoloi		26 January 1950	6 August 1950	192 days
2.	Bishnuram Medhi		9 August 1950	27 December 1957	7 years, 140 days
3.	Bimala Prasad Chaliha		27 December 1957	6 November 1970	12 years, 314 days
4.	Mahendra Mohan Choudhry		6 November 1970	30 January 1972	1 year, 85 days
5.	Sarat Chandra Sinha		31 January 1972	12 March 1978	6 years, 40 days
6.	Anwara Taimur		6 December 1980	30 June 1981	206 days
7.	Keshab Chandra Gogoi		13 January 1982	19 March 1982	65 days
8.	Hiteswar Saikia		27 February 1983	23 December 1985	7 years, 231 days
8.	Hiteswar Saikia		30 June 1991	22 April 1996	7 years, 231 days
9.	Bhumidhar Barman		22 April 1996	14 May 1996	22 days
10.	Tarun Gogoi		18 May 2001	24 May 2016	15 years, 6 days

== List of Union Ministers ==
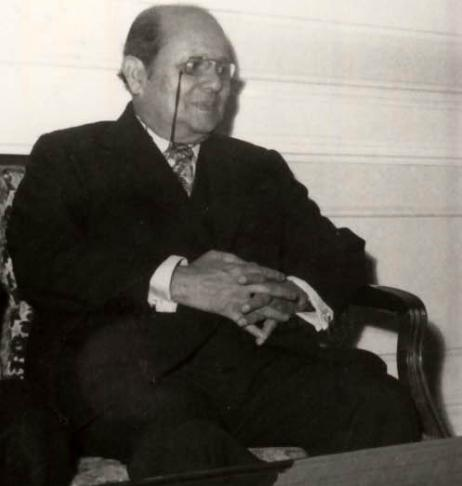
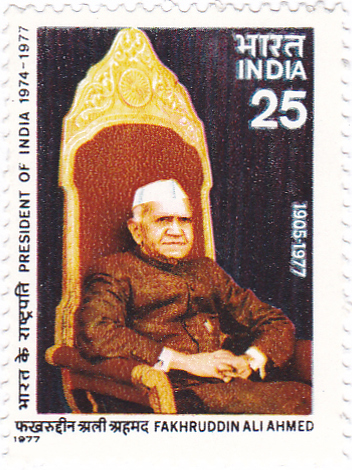
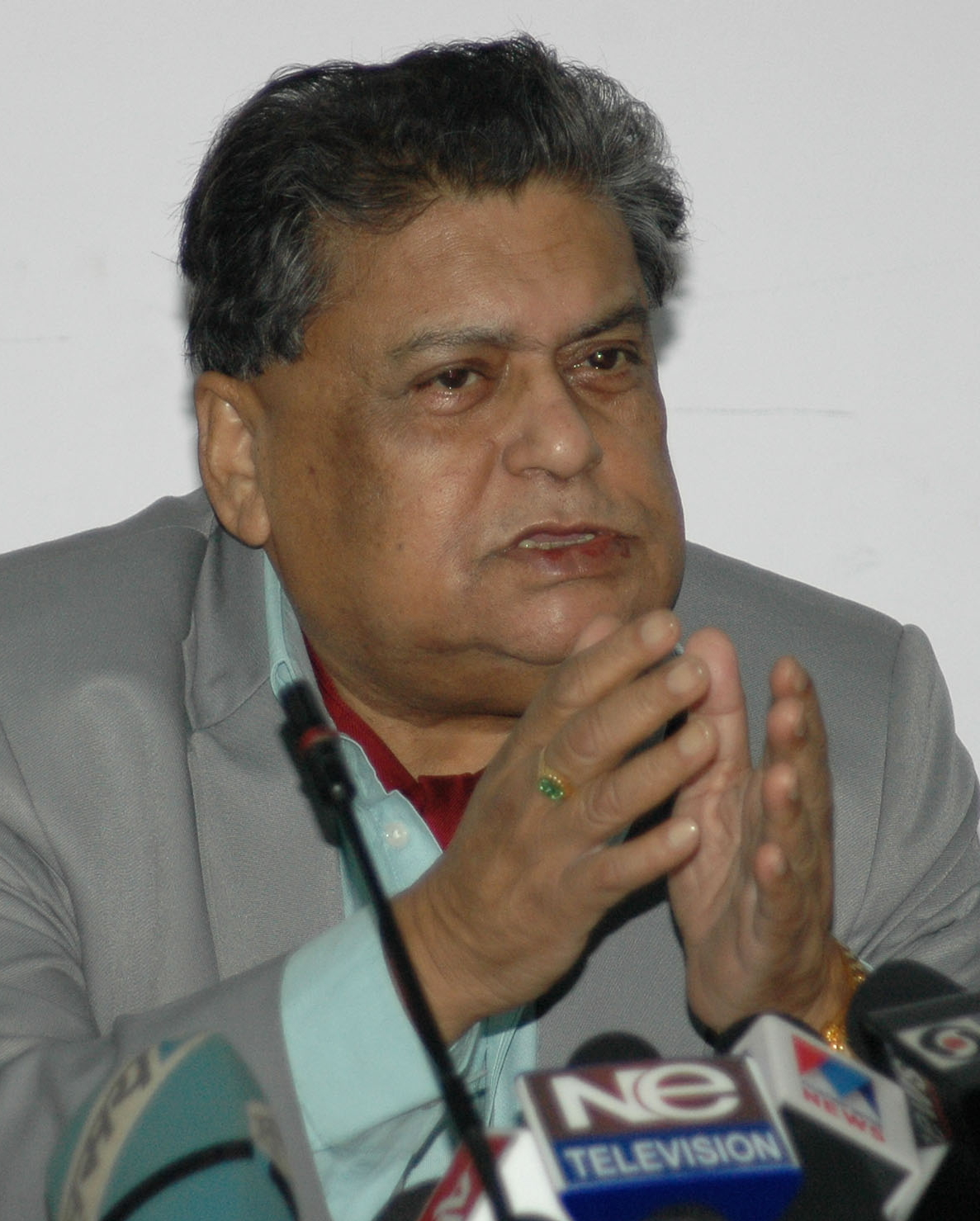
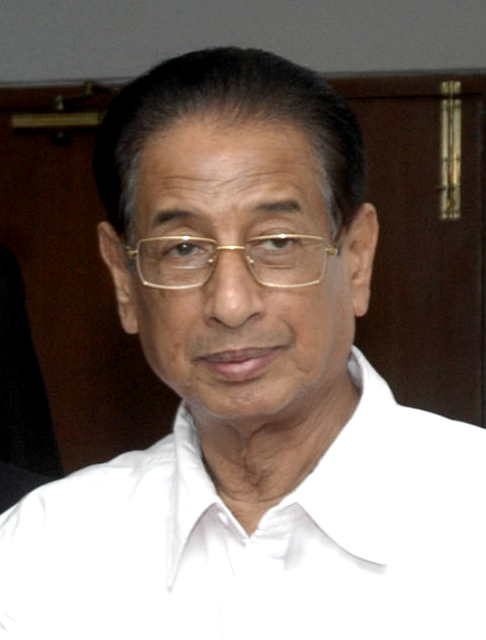
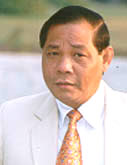
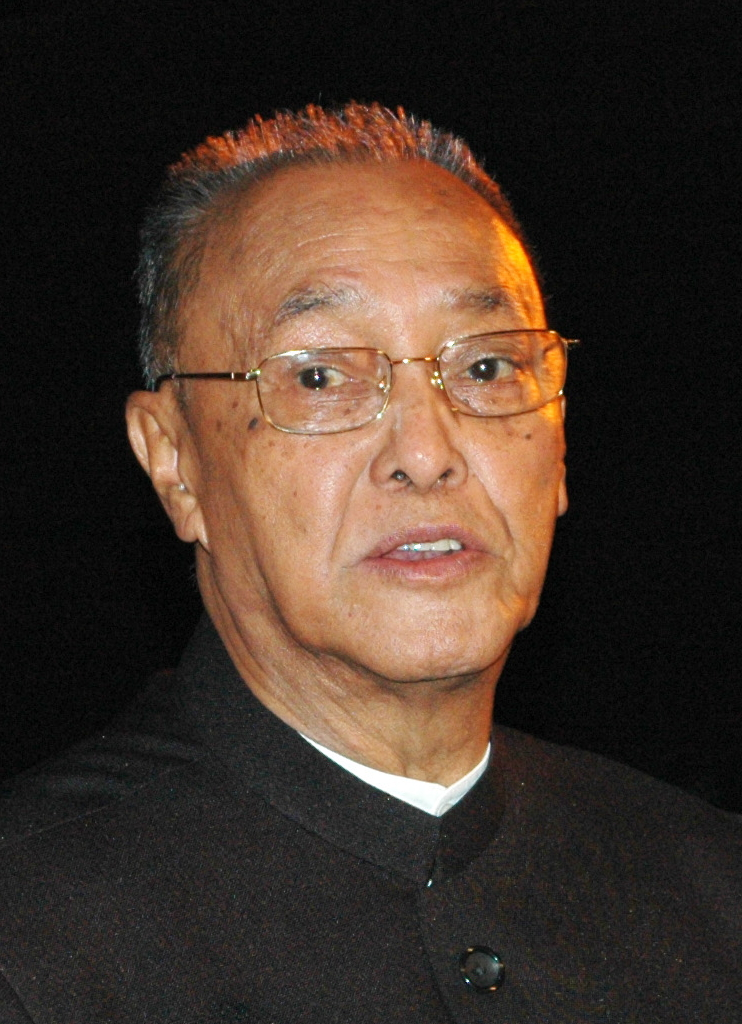
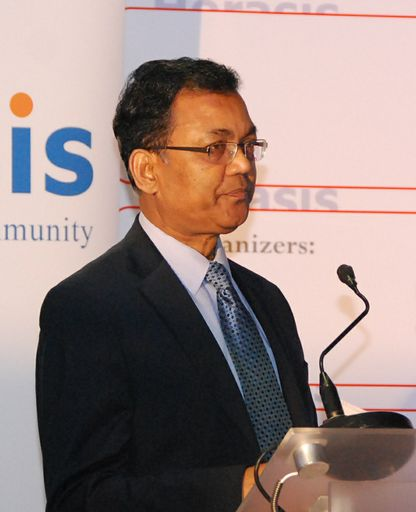
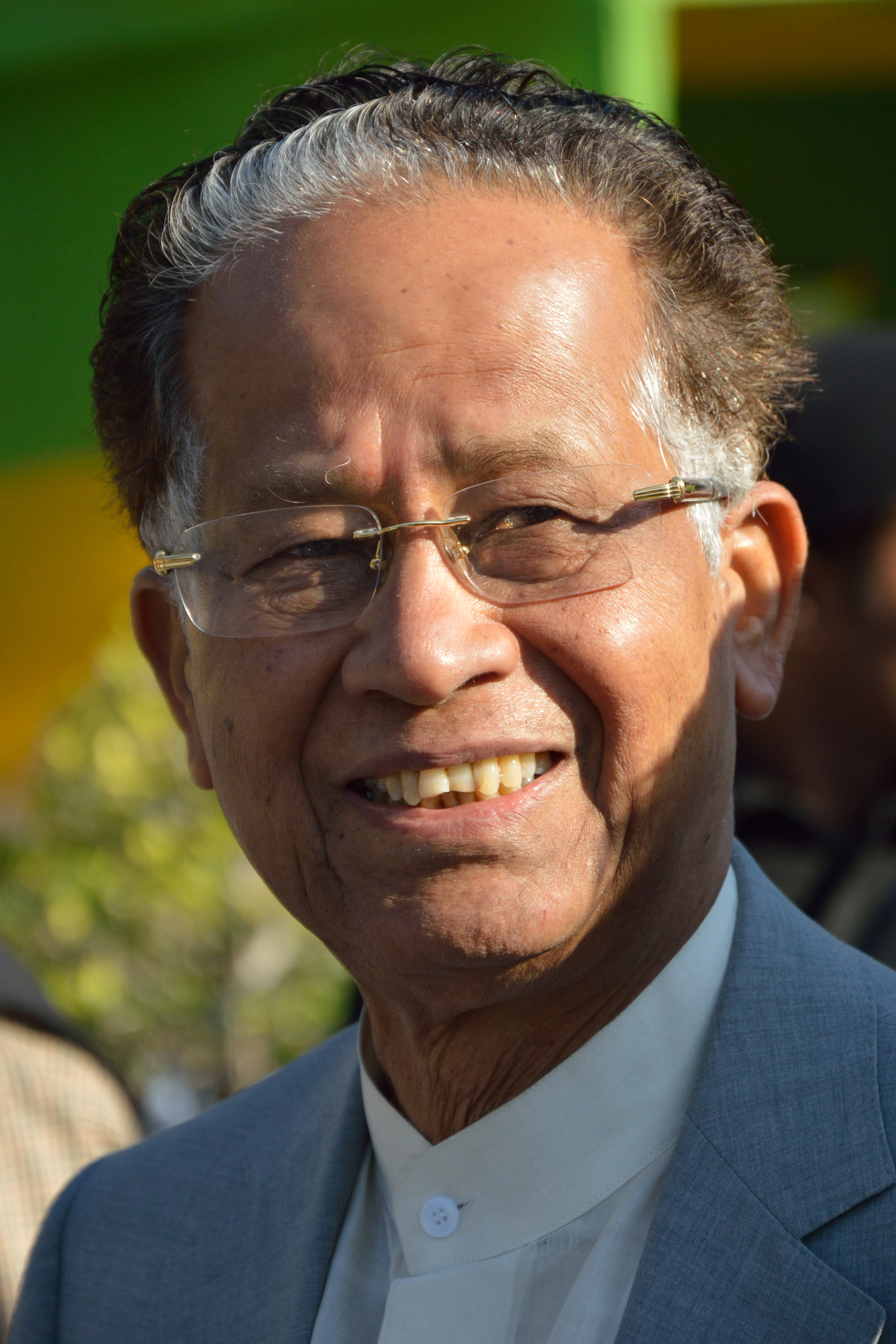
S.No.	Portrait	Ministe	Prime Minister	Constituency	Term	Ministry
1.		Dev Kant Baruah	Indira Gandhi	Minister of Petroleum and Natural Gas	5 February 1973 to 10 October 1974	Third Indira Gandhi ministry
2.		Fakhruddin Ali Ahmed	Indira Gandhi	Minister of Power and Irrigation	29 January 1966 – 13 November 1966	First Indira Gandhi ministry
2.		Fakhruddin Ali Ahmed	Indira Gandhi	Minister of Education	13 November 1966 – 12 March 1967	First Indira Gandhi ministry
2.		Fakhruddin Ali Ahmed	Indira Gandhi	Minister of Industrial Development, Internal Trade and Company Affairs	13 March 1967 – 27 June 1970	Second Indira Gandhi ministry
2.		Fakhruddin Ali Ahmed	Indira Gandhi	Minister of Food and Agriculture	27 June 1970 – 3 July 1974	Third Indira Gandhi ministry
3.		Santosh Mohan Dev	Manmohan Singh	Minister of Heavy Industries and Public Enterprises	23 May 2004-22 May 2009	First Manmohan Singh ministry
3.		Santosh Mohan Dev	Manmohan Singh	Minister of State for Water Resources(Independent Charge)	18 November 2005 – 28 January 2006	First Manmohan Singh ministry
3.		Santosh Mohan Dev	Manmohan Singh	Minister of State for Heavy Industries and Public Enterprises(Independent Charge)	23 May 2004-29 January 2006	First Manmohan Singh ministry
3.		Santosh Mohan Dev	P. V. Narasimha Rao	Minister of State for Steel(Independent Charge)	21 June 1991-16 May 1996	Rao ministry
3.		Santosh Mohan Dev	Rajiv Gandhi	Minister of State for Tourism	12 May 1986-28 July 1987	Second Rajiv Gandhi ministry
3.		Santosh Mohan Dev	Rajiv Gandhi	Minister of State for Defence	14 February 1988-4 July 1989	Second Rajiv Gandhi ministry
3.		Santosh Mohan Dev	Rajiv Gandhi	Minister of State for Home Affairs	25 June 1988-2 December 1989	Second Rajiv Gandhi ministry
4.		Bijoy Krishna Handique	Manmohan Singh	Minister of Mines	28 May 2009-19 January 2011	Second Manmohan Singh ministry
4.		Bijoy Krishna Handique	Manmohan Singh	Minister of Development of North Eastern Region	28 May 2009-12 July 2011	Second Manmohan Singh ministry
4.		Bijoy Krishna Handique	Manmohan Singh	Minister of State for Parliamentary Affairs	23 May 2004-6 April 2008	First Manmohan Singh ministry
4.		Bijoy Krishna Handique	Manmohan Singh	Minister of State for Defence	23 May 2004-29 January 2006	First Manmohan Singh ministry
4.		Bijoy Krishna Handique	Manmohan Singh	Minister of State for Chemicals and Fertilizers	29 January 2006-22 May 2008	First Manmohan Singh ministry
5.		P. A. Sangma	P. V. Narasimha Rao	Minister of Information and Broadcasting	15 September 1995-18 May 1996	Rao ministry
5.		P. A. Sangma	P. V. Narasimha Rao	Minister of State for Labour and Employment(Independent Charge)	10 July 1995-15 September 1995	Rao ministry
5.		P. A. Sangma	P. V. Narasimha Rao	Minister of State for Coal(Independent Charge)	21 June 1991-18 January 1993	Rao ministry
5.		P. A. Sangma	Rajiv Gandhi	Minister of State for Labour and Employment(Independent Charge)	20 September 1986-6 February 1988	Second Rajiv Gandhi ministry
5.		P. A. Sangma	Rajiv Gandhi	Minister of State for Home Affairs	25 September 1985-20 January 1988	Second Rajiv Gandhi ministry
5.		P. A. Sangma	Rajiv Gandhi	Minister of State for Commerce and supply	1 January 1985-25 September 1985	Second Rajiv Gandhi ministry
5.		P. A. Sangma	Rajiv Gandhi	Deputy Minister of Commerce	4 November 1984-31 December 1984	First Rajiv Gandhi ministry
5.		P. A. Sangma	Indira Gandhi	Deputy Minister of Commerce	15 January1982-31 October 1984	Fourth Indira Gandhi ministry
5.		P. A. Sangma	Indira Gandhi	Deputy Minister of Industry	31 October 1980-15 February 1982	Fourth Indira Gandhi ministry
6.		Moinul Hoque Choudhury	Indira Gandhi	Minister of Industrial Development	18 March 1971-22 July 1974	Third Indira Gandhi ministry
6.		Moinul Hoque Choudhury	Indira Gandhi	Minister of Supply	18 March 1971-2 May 1971	Third Indira Gandhi ministry
7.		Paty Ripple Kyndiah	Manmohan Singh	Minister of Tribal Affairs	23 May 2004-22 May 2009	First Manmohan Singh ministry
7.		Paty Ripple Kyndiah	Manmohan Singh	Minister of Development of North Eastern Region	23 May 2004-24 October 2006	First Manmohan Singh ministry
8.		Paban Singh Ghatowar	Manmohan Singh	Minister of State for Development of North Eastern Region(Independent Charge)	12 July 2011-26 May 2014	Second Manmohan Singh ministry
8.		Paban Singh Ghatowar	Manmohan Singh	Minister of State for Parliamentary Affairs	20 July 2011-26 May 2014	Second Manmohan Singh ministry
8.		Paban Singh Ghatowar		Minister of State for Health and Family Welfare	15 September 1995-16 May 1996
8.		Paban Singh Ghatowar	P. V. Narasimha Rao	Deputy Minister for Health and Family Welfare	18 January 1993-15 September 1995	Rao ministry
8.		Paban Singh Ghatowar	P. V. Narasimha Rao	Deputy Minister for Labour	21 June 1991-18 January 1993	Rao ministry
9.		Tarun Gogoi	P. V. Narasimha Rao	Minister of State for Food Processing Industries(Independent Charge)	17 July 1993-13 September 1995	Rao ministry

== Union Ministers of State ==
S.no	Portrait	Name	Prime Minister		Term	Period	Ministry
1.		Surendranath Buragohain	Jawaharlal Nehru	Deputy Minister of Works, Mines and Power	14 August 1950-26 December 1950	134 days	First Nehru ministry
1.		Surendranath Buragohain	Jawaharlal Nehru	Deputy Minister of Works, Production and Supply	26 December 1950-13 May 1952	1 year 139 days	First Nehru ministry
1.		Surendranath Buragohain	Jawaharlal Nehru	Deputy Minister of Works, Housing and Supply	13 May 1952-4 October 1953	1 year 144 days	Second Nehru ministry
2.		Bijoy Chandra Bhagavati					

== List of Disrict Congress Committee- Presidents ==
S.No	DCC	President
1	Tinsukia	Durga Bhumaji
2	Dibrugarh	Bipul Rabha
3	Charaideo	Utpal Gogoi
4	Shivasagar	Ajay Gogoi
5	Jorhat	Putul Burgahain
6	Majuli	Amal Pujari
7	Golaghat	Madan Bora
8	Dhemaji	Tilok Phukan
9	Lakhimpur	Gangajyoti Tayyagen
10	Bishwanath	Prasanta Hazarika
11	Sonitpur	Kartik Kurmi
12	Nagaon	Runu Moni Borah
13	Hojai	Jili Chowdhary
14	West Karbi Anglong	Augustine Enghee
15	Karbi Anglong	Raton Engti
16	Morigaon	Bir Kumar Konwar
17	Dima Hasao	Heijeranbe Nriame
18	Kamrup Rural	Pranjit Choudhary
19	Guwahati	Swapan Das
20	Darrang	Rijumani Talukdar
21	Goalpara	Gignta Medhi
22	Hailakandi	Ishaque ali Barbhuyan
23	Karimganj	Tapash Purkayashta
24	Cachar	Sajal Acharjee
25	Barpeta	Rajib Haque
26	Bongaigon	Girish Baruah
27	Nalbari	Ratul Patwary
28	Kokhrajhar	Joseph Prem Hadda
29	Baksa	Buddhadev Phangary
30	Tamalpur	Yashwant Chauhan
31	Bajali	Guptamoni Sarma
32	Chirang	Mati Lal Narzary
33	Udalguri	Dhaneshwar Bodo
34	Dhubri	Ama Begum
35	South Salmara	Motiur Rahaman Mandal

== See also ==
- All India Congress Committee
- Congress Working Committee
- Indian National Congress
- Pradesh Congress Committee
- Chabilal Upadhyaya
- Kuladhar Chaliha
- All India Mahila Congress
- Indian Youth Congress
- National Students Union of India
