= BSF =

BSF may refer to:

== Organisations ==
- Ballerup-Skovlunde Fodbold, a Danish football club
- British Skin Foundation, a UK charity raising money for skin disease and skin cancer research
- Bibliothèques Sans Frontières, an international non profit
- Bible Study Fellowship, an international Christian organisation
- United States – Israel Binational Science Foundation
- Biosciences Federation, a UK life science organisation
- Border Security Force, Indian federal border patrol agency
- Brandy Station Foundation, an organization devoted to preserving a battle site in Virginia, United States
- British Softball Federation, the National Governing Body of softball within the UK
- Bund Schweizerischer Frauenvereine, Swiss national federation of women's organizations

== Science ==
- Basilar skull fracture, a head injury
- Biosand filter, water filtration technique
- Black Soldier Fly, a larva used in permaculture

== Computing ==
- Bean Scripting Framework, software to integrate the Java programming language with other scripting languages
- Bit Scan Forward, an x86 instruction used to find the least significant bit set in a binary word
- Bootstrapping Server Function part of GAA/GBA Generic Bootstrapping Architecture

== Miscellaneous ==
- Black Sea Fleet, the fleet of the Russian Navy in the Black Sea
- Black Sea Forum for Partnership and Dialogue, regional forum first held in 2006
- Boies Schiller Flexner LLP, an American law firm
- Hard bolívar, abbreviated BsF or Bs.F, the currency of Venezuela from 2008 to 2018
- Boysetsfire, an American post-hardcore rock band
- Bradshaw Army Airfield, with IATA airport code BSF
- British Standard Fine, an imperial-unit based screw-thread standard
- Building Schools for the Future, a British Government initiative to rebuild schools, from 2004 to 2010
- BSF (time service), Taiwan's time signal
- Segelföreningen i Björneborg, Finnish yacht club
