= Bikash Saikia =

Indian politician (born 1974)

Bikash Saikia (born 1974) is an Indian politician from the northeastern state of Assam. He was a member of the Assam Legislative Assembly from the Teok Assembly constituency in Jorhat district representing the Asom Gana Parishad.

Saikia is from Teok, Jorhat district, Assam. He is the son of Kamaleswar Saikia. He completed his M.A. in 2017 at J.B College, Johrat which is affiliated with Krishan Kanta Handiqui State Open University. He runs his own business. He declared assets worth Rs.1 crore in his affidavit to the Election Commission of India.

== Career ==
Saikia won the Teok Assembly constituency representing the Asom Gana Parishad in the 2026 Assam Legislative Assembly election. He polled 90,368 and defeated his nearest rival, Pallabi Saikia Gogoi of the Indian National Congress, by a margin of 22,672 votes.
