= Chabilal Upadhyaya =

Indian politician

- Born: 12 May 1882; Budhigang (Undivided Darrang) now in Biswanath district, Assam
- Died: 24 January 1980 (aged 97); Mazgaon (Gangmouthan)
- Other names: Chabilal Upadhyaya, Chabilal Babu
- Occupation: Political leader of Assam
- Political party: Assam Pradesh Congress Committee

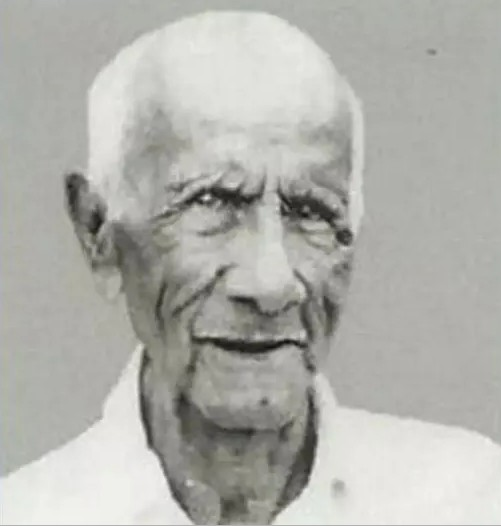

Chabilal Upadhyaya (12 May 1882 – 24 January 1980), was the first (selected) president of the Assam Pradesh Congress Committee. In 1919 Upadhyaya's family settled at Mazgaon (Gangmouthan), Behali Tehsil in present day Biswanath district of Assam.

== Early life and education ==
- Born on 12 May 1882 in Budhigang (now Biswanath district). His family later moved to Gangmouthan in Behali.
- Had basic schooling before continuing his studies privately in Sanskrit, Assamese, Bengali, Hindi and Nepali.

== Political contributions ==
Chabilal Upadhyaya, popularly known as Chabilal Babu, was a prominent leader of the Indian Freedom Movement from Assam. Upadhyaya joined the war of independence.

Under his leadership, thirty thousand Nepali speaking people protested against Muhammad Ali Jinnah's proposal at the call of All India Gorkha League.

== Role in Freedom Movement ==
- In 18 April 1921, he presided over a pivotal Jorhat meeting that merged Assam Association into the newly formed Assam PCC — and became its first selected president.
- Actively led the Non-Cooperation Movement across Assam; his activism resulted in a six-month jail term under British rule.
- Close association with Mahatma Gandhi, including translating his speeches during Gandhi’s 1921 Assam visit.

== Social & Educational Contributions ==
- Established schools and libraries for the Nepali/Gorkha community of Assam — notably the Behali School at Tezpur in 1941.
- Advocated for unity among Assam’s linguistic communities and took a firm stand against proposed territorial divisions post-independence.

The Assam government commemorates him in several ways:

- Built a life‑size statue in Tezpur unveiled by CM Himanta Biswa Sarma in June 2024, honoring his legacy and highlighting his leadership in the Non‑Cooperation Movement.
- Approved a Chabilal Upadhyay Engineering College in Behali, named after him in October 2020.
- Plans are underway to erect another public statue in Guwahati, with site selection by GMDA and family consultation led by CM Sarma.

== See also ==
- Assam Pradesh Congress Committee
- Kuladhar Chaliha
- Indian National Congress
- Biswanath District
