= Tankeswar Chetia =

Indian statesman, anti-colonial activist, and educationist

Member of Assam Legislative Assembly
- In office 1957 – 1967
- Preceded by: Ananda Chandra Bezbarua
- Succeeded by: K.K. Gogoi
- Constituency: Nazira

Personal details
- Born: 9 March 1915
- Died: Unknown; after 2007
- Party: Indian National Congress
- Spouse: Surya Prova Baruah
- Children: 5
- Parents: Khogeswar Chetia (father); Luita Chetia (mother)
- Education: Cotton College
- Occupation: Statesman; anti-colonial activist; educationist

Tankeswar Chetia (9 March 1915 – after 2007) was an Indian statesman, freedom fighter, anti-colonial activist, and educationist who served two terms as the Member of Assam Legislative Assembly for Nazira from 1957 to 1967.

== Early life and education ==
Tankeswar Chetia was born on 9 March 1915, the son of Khogeswar and Luita Chetia.

Chetia completed his primary education in Namti Chariali and then studied at Nazira High School. He completed his matriculation from Jorhat centre under Calcutta university, and his ISc before he graduated from Cotton College.

== Early political activism ==
During his studies at Cotton College, Chetia, along with other students, became involved with the Indian independence movement. Having been influenced by Gopinath Bordoloi, he organised several anti-British meetings in Namti.

In May 1932, he took part in the students strike against British rule while he was in Class III at Nazira high school. In the area he was also involved in the opium prohibition movement and satyagraha movement. In 1941–1942, he was given a police lathi charge while opposing war efforts as a student protester in Gauhati at Cotton College during the Quit India Movement.

Chetia was arrested on 26 September 1942 (Note: Other sources note the date of the arrest as 29 September; this article records the date given by MLA Khogendra Nath Borbaruah in "Ek Aparajeya Duranta Tarun Srijut Tankeswar Chetia") at Namti Chariali Railway station with other students and teachers for hampering military supply. He was detained at the station for 24 hours in handcuffs with no food or drink, and on 27 September he was produced before the Sibsagar Magistrate. A case under section 395/341 of the Indian Penal Code and section 122 of the 1890 Indian Railways Act was brought against him. On 31 May 1943, he was convicted along with other independence revolutionaries and sentenced for six months.

A warrant of arrest was also issued due to absence from Cotton College since the puja vacation of 1942 and anti-government activities. His house was raided by police but he managed to avoid the arrest warrant and prison sentence in December 1942 by going "underground". While operating in hiding, he continued his activism in various areas including the Sibsagar district, Naga Hills district, Manipur state and Dhaka district. During this time, he helped Namti high school through fund collection, and also supplied volunteers with necessities and blankets, as well as incendiary materials such as detonators.

== Political and teaching career ==
At the 1957 Assam Legislative Assembly election, Chetia was elected as the member of Assam Legislative Assembly for Nazira. He stood as the Indian National Congress candidate and won 8598 votes. He was reelected at the 1962 Assam Legislative Assembly election. He was not selected as the Congress candidate for the 1967 election, and was succeeded by K.K. Gogoi. Due to his disappointment at not being selected as the Congress candidate in the 1967 election, he set up his wife, Surya Prova Chetia, to contest election for the Sonari assembly constituency against Chief Minister Bimala Prasad Chaliha. She polled 2,000 out of 20,838 votes and was defeated in the election.

After leaving politics, Chetia worked in education and became the headmaster of Namti boys school.

== Personal life ==
Chetia was married to Surya Prova Baruah and together they had five children: Naba Kumar, Sameer Kumar, Ashim Kumar, Juthika and Beethika.

== See also ==
- List of Indian independence activists
