= Krishna Nath Sarmah =

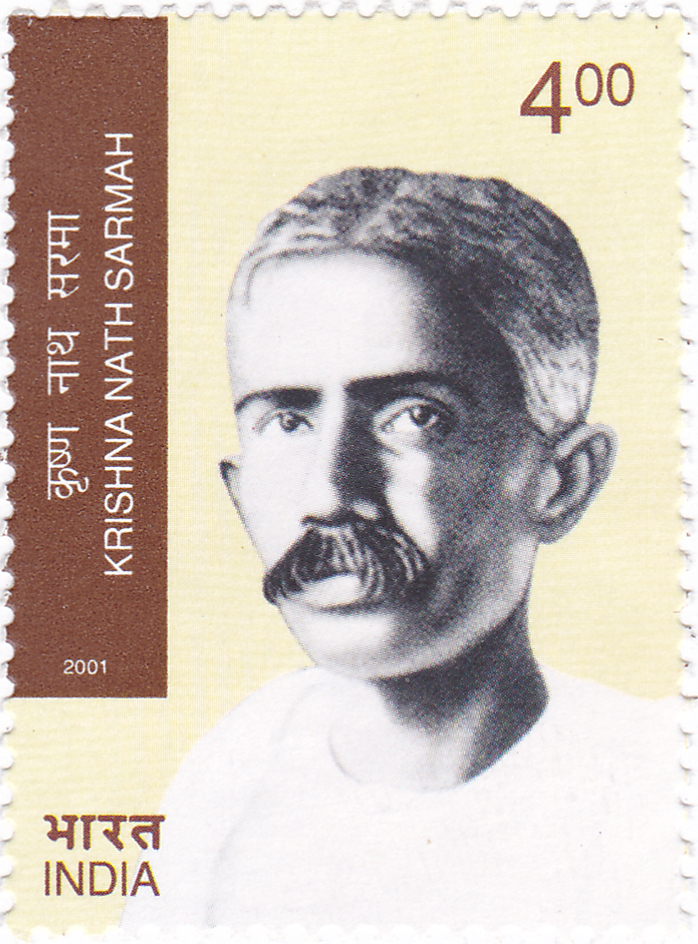
Krishna Nath Sarmah on a 2001 stamp of India

Krishna Nath Sarmah (1887–1947) was a renowned nationalist and social reformer from Assam. He was born in a Brahmin family. After graduating with degrees in science and law, he started a legal practice in 1917. Inspired by Mahatma Gandhi, he joined the freedom struggle instead. Along with Tarun Ram Phukan, Nabin Chandra Bardoloi and Gopinath Bardoloi, he was one of the forerunners in the Indian freedom struggle in Assam. Upon hearing about Gandhi's mission, Sarmah invited him to open his Namghar and thus the events of April 1934 happened. Following this event, he even opened 12 schools for the Dalit community.
