= Auniati University =

Cultural private University of Assam

- Type: Private
- Established: 13 October 2022
- Academic affiliations: UGC
- Endowment: Auniati Socio Cultural and Educational Development Trust
- Chancellor: Dr. Sri Sri Pitambar Dev Goswami
- Vice-Chancellor: Dr. Prakash Jyoti Borthakur (I/C)
- Location: Teok, Jorhat, Assam, India
- Campus: 63 Bigha; Urban
- Website: auniv.ac.in

Auniati University is a cultural private university of Assam in India established in 2022 under Assam Act XXXIX of 2022 Assam Legislative Assembly by Auniati Socio- Cultural and Educational Development Trust at Teok about 30 km from Jorhat along the NH 37 with an area of 63 bigha land.

University offers state-of-the-art education with 64 Kalas science, cultural and moral needs of society. The university offers degree in Performing arts, Journalism and Mass communication, Physical education and Sociology.
