= Hemoprova Saikia =

Indian politician (born 1940)

Cabinet Minister, Assam
- In office 17 May 2001 – 21 May 2006
- Chief Minister: Tarun Gogoi
- Departments: Handloom and Textiles; Sericulture; Fisheries (until 2002); Cultural Affairs (until 2002)
- Succeeded by: Pranab Gogoi (Handloom, Textiles, Sericulture); Nurjamal Sarkar (Fisheries); Gautam Bora (Cultural Affairs)

Chairperson, Assam Tourism Development Corporation
- In office 10 March 2006 – 3 August 2016
- Preceded by: Ajit Singh
- Succeeded by: Jayanta Malla Baruah

Member, Assam Legislative Assembly
- In office November 1996 – 11 May 2006
- Preceded by: Hiteswar Saikia
- Succeeded by: Drupad Borgohain
- Constituency: Nazira

Personal details
- Born: 21 February 1940 (age 86)
- Party: Indian National Congress
- Spouse: Hiteswar Saikia (d. 1996)
- Children: 3, including Debabrata Saikia

Dr. Hemoprova Saikia (born 21 February 1940) is an Indian politician who was the minister of handloom and textiles in the government of Assam from 2001 to 2006. She was a member of the Assam Legislative Assembly representing Nazira constituency from 1996 to 2006. She was also chairwoman of Assam Tourism Development Corporation. She was the wife of the former chief minister of Assam, Hiteswar Saikia, and their son, Debabrata Saikia, is leader of the opposition in the Assembly.
