= Dipali Barthakur =

Indian singer

- Born: 30 January 1941; Nilomoni Tea Estate, Sonari, Sivasagar, Assam
- Died: 21 December 2018 (aged 77); Guwahati
- Occupation: Singer
- Years active: 1955-1969
- Spouse: Neel Pawan Baruah
- Awards: Padmashri, 1998

Dipali Barthakur (30 January 1941 – 21 December 2018) was an Indian singer from Assam. Her songs were sung mainly in the Assamese language. She received the fourth-highest civilian award of India, the Padma Shri, in the year 1998.

== Early life ==
Barthakur was born in 1941 to Bishwanath Borthakur and Chandrakanti Devi in Sonari at Sivasagar, Assam.

== Musical career ==
Barthakur started her career as a singer early. When she was studying in class nine, in 1958, she sang the song "Mor Bopai Lahori" on All India Radio, Guwahati, and the song "Joubone Amoni Kore Chenaidhon" for the film Lachit Borphukan (1959).

Some of her other popular Assamese songs are:

- "Sonor Kharu Nalage Muk"
- "Joubone Aamoni Kore, Chenaidhon"
- "Jundhone Junalite"
- "Konmana Boroxire Sip"
- "Senai Moi Jau Dei"
- "O' Bondhu Somoi Pale Amar Phale"

== Personal life ==
Barthakur sang her last song "Luito nejabi boi" in 1969. After that she began suffering from a severe motor neuron disease which hindered her singing and forced her to use a wheelchair. In 1976 she married Neel Pawan Barua, an eminent Indian artist and painter from Assam and son of renowned Assamese writer Binanda Chandra Barua.

Barthakur died on 21 December 2018 at Nemcare Hospital, Guwahati, after a prolonged illness. She was known as "Nightingale of Assam".

== Awards ==
Barthakur was honored many times, most notably with the Padma Shri award for folk and traditional music in 1990–92.

Some of her awards/ recognitions are listed below:

- Padma Shri (1998) for her contribution to the Arts by the Government of India.
- Silipi Bota (2010) from Government of Assam.
- Aideu Handique Silpi Award (2012) by the Sadou Asom Lekhika Somaroh Samiti.
