= Binanda Chandra Barua =

Indian writer and poet

Binanda Chandra Barua (1901–1994) was a noted Indian writer and poet of Assamese literature from Teok, Assam. He is popularly known as Dhwoni Kobi. His pen-name is Kerpai Sarma. He was President of the Asam Sahitya Sabha in 1966. Some of the popular books of the writer are Gargaon, Sankhadhwani, Jaidhwani and Pratidhwani etc. 'Garhgaon' is an eminent poem of him where he describes the royalty of the capital Garhgaon in Ahom kingdom. He was honored with the title of Sahityacharya by the Assam Sahitya Sabha in 1989. He contributed to the development of Assamese drama during the pre-independence period. His son is eminent Indian painter and artist Neel Pawan Baruah who was married to noted Assamese singer Dipali Barthakur.
