= Renupoma Rajkhowa =

19th Speaker of the Assam Legislative Assembly

Member of Assam Legislative Assembly
- Incumbent
- Assumed office 2016
- Preceded by: Membor Gogoi
- Constituency: Teok
- In office 1991–2001
- Preceded by: Lalit Chandra Rajkhowa
- Constituency: Teok

Deputy Speaker of Assam Legislative Assembly
- In office 14 May 1999 - 17 May 2001
- Speaker: Ganesh Kutum
- Preceded by: Nurul Hussain
- Succeeded by: Tanka Bahadur Rai

Personal details
- Born: 1 July 1955 (age 70)
- Party: Asom Gana Parishad
- Spouse: Lalit Chandra Rajkhowa

Renupoma Rajkhowa (born 1 July 1955) is an Asom Gana Parishad politician from Assam, India. She is a four- time MLA from the Teok Assembly constituency.

== Early life and education ==
Rajkhowa is from Teok, Jorhat district. She completed her Class 12 in 1976.

== Career ==
Rajkhowa was elected into the Assam Legislative Assembly election in 1991, 1996, 2016 from Teok constituency. She is the wife of Lalit Chandra Rajkhowa who she succeeded as the Member of the Assam Legislative Assembly from the Teok constituency in 1991. She was also Deputy Speaker of Assam Legislative Assembly.
