= Debabrata Saikia =

Indian politician (born 1964)

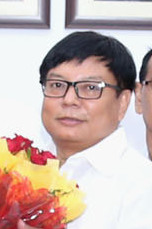
- Official Portrait, 2016

Leader of the Opposition Assam Legislative Assembly
- In office 20 May 2016 – 12 May 2026
- Preceded by: Prafulla Kumar Mahanta
- Succeeded by: Wazed Ali Choudhury

Member of the Assam Legislative Assembly
- In office 13 May 2011 – 4 May 2026
- Preceded by: Drupad Borgohain
- Succeeded by: Mayur Borgohain
- Constituency: Nazira

Personal details
- Born: 14 December 1964 (age 61) Nazira, Assam, India
- Party: Indian National Congress
- Spouse: Bandana Saikia
- Children: 2
- Parents: Hiteswar Saikia (father); Hemoprova Saikia (mother)
- Education: Calcutta University
- Occupation: Politician
- Website: www.debabratasaikia.in

Debabrata Saikia (born 14 December 1964) is an Indian politician from Assam who served as the Leader of the Opposition in the Assam Legislative Assembly from 2016 to 2026. He represented Nazira as a MLA from 2011 to 2026. He is the son of former Chief Minister of Assam, Hiteswar Saikia, and of former minister in the Government of Assam, Hemoprova Saikia.

== Early and personal life ==
Saikia was born on 14 December 1964, at Nazira, Sivasagar, Assam. He is the son of Hiteswar Saikia, who was the Chief Minister of Assam from 1983 to 1985, and again from 1991 to 1996, and of Hemoprova Saikia, who was a senior minister in the Assam government during the First Tarun Gogoi Ministry from 2001 to 2006. Saikia graduated from Calcutta University with a BA degree. He married Bandana Saikia, with whom he has two children, Luit and Krishnika. His father served five-terms as a MLA in the Assam Legislative Assembly from Nazira, and was appointed by Prime Minister Rajiv Gandhi as the first Governor of Mizoram after the Mizoram Peace Accord, serving from 1987 to 1989. His mother served two-terms as MLA of Nazira from 1996 to 2006.

== Political career ==
Saikia entered politics in 1991 through the Assam Pradesh Youth Congress, serving as General Secretary from 1992 to 1993 and as Vice President from 1993 to 1996. He was elected to the Assam Legislative Assembly from Nazira in 2011, and was re-elected in 2016 and 2021. In 2016, Saikia was elected as the Leader of the Opposition in the Assam Legislative Assembly by a vote of the legislators of the Congress party. He temporarily lost the position in 2021 after the resignation of some Congress legislators who ended up joining the ruling Bharatiya Janata Party. However, Saikia was reinstated as the Leader of the Opposition after he appealed to the Guwahati High Court. He was defeated in the 2026 election by a massive margin of 46,701 votes by BJP's Mayur Borgohain.
