= Simaluguri =

Gargaon
- Town
- Gargaon
- Location in Assam, India Gargaon (India)
- Coordinates: 26°55′16″N 94°45′16″E
- Country: India
- State: Assam
- District: Sivasagar

Government
  - Body: Gargaon Town Committee
- Elevation: 100 m (330 ft)

Population (2025)
  - Total: 50,000

Languages
  - Official: Assamese
- Time zone: UTC+5:30 (IST)
- PIN: 785686
- ISO 3166 code: IN-AS
- Vehicle registration: AS-04
- Nearest city: SivasagarNaziraSonari
- Lok Sabha constituency: Jorhat
- Vidhan Sabha constituency: Nazira

Gargaon is a town area in Sivasagar district in the state of Assam, India.The Dikhow River flows near it.

== Transportation ==
The primary railway station of Sivasagar district is Simaluguri Junction railway station, which lies on the Lumding–Dibrugarh section. Also you can use Bus station from SIvasagar town.
