= Teok =

- Town
- Location in Assam, India Teok (India)
- Coordinates: 26°50′27″N 94°25′30″E
- Country: India
- State: Assam
- District: Jorhat
- Subdivision: Jorhat

Government
  - Body: Teok Municipal Board

Languages
  - Official: Assamese
- Time zone: UTC+5:30 (IST)
- PIN: 785112
- Telephone code: 0376
- Vehicle registration: AS 03

Teok is a town and municipal board situated in the Jorhat district of Assam, India. It is at a distance of about 20 kilometres from Jorhat city. The term 'Teok' is derived from the Tai languages. It literally means – ‘The place of milk and ghee’.

== Transport ==
The National Highway 37 passes through Teok and connects it to other places of Assam. There is an Assam State Transport Corporation bus station. Jorhat Airport is the nearest airport to Teok. The town is well connected with nearby railway stations - Mariani Junction Railway Station, Selenghat Railway Station and Amguri Railway Station.

== Education ==
=== Schools ===
- Teok Rajabari Higher Secondary School
- Jyoti Vidyapith, Teok
- Teok High School
- Ben Garden High School, Teok
- Teok Girls' Higher Secondary School
- Teok Jatiya Vidyalaya
- Holy Flower Senior Secondary School, Teok
- Teok Rajabari Govt. Junior Basic School
- Jogduar High School

=== Junior Colleges and Degree College ===
- Teok Senior Secondary School
- Renu Borah Memorial Academy, Teok
- Jnanpith Academy, Teok
- Kakojan College
- Chandra Kamal Bezbaruah College, Teok

=== Universities ===
- Auniati University
- Assam Women's University, Teok Campus

== Hospitals ==
- First Referral Unit (F.R.U.), Teok

== List of Bank Branches ==
- State Bank of India, Teok ADB Branch
- Punjab National Bank, Boloma Branch
- HDFC Bank, Teok Branch
- IDBI Bank, Teok Grant Branch
- ICICI Bank, Teok Branch
- North East Small Finance Bank, Teok Branch
- The Assam Cooperative Apex Bank Ltd, Teok Branch
- Assam Gramin Vikash Bank, Badulipukhuri Branch
- Bandhan Bank, Jagduar Branch

== Politics ==
Teok is part of Jorhat (Lok Sabha constituency) and AGP's Bikash Saikia is the current MLA of Teok (Vidhan Sabha constituency).

== Notable people ==
- Binanda Chandra Barua, famous Assamese poet and author.

== Notable Places to Visit Nearby ==
- Sri Sri Auniati Satra, Kaliapani (6 km away).
- Dhekiakhowa Bornamghar (12 km away).
- Lachit Borphukan's Maidam, tomb of the National Hero of Assam Lachit Borphukan (12 km away).
- Jhanjimukh, mouth of the river Jhanji in the Brahmaputra, a place full of natural beauty and a small picnic spot (12 km away).
