= Teok Assembly constituency =

Constituency of the Assam legislative assembly in India

Teok
- Constituency No. 99 for the Assam Legislative Assembly

Constituency details
- Country: India
- Region: Northeast India
- State: Assam
- District: Jorhat
- Lok Sabha constituency: Jorhat
- Established: 1951
- Reservation: None

Member of Legislative Assembly
- 16th Assam Legislative Assembly
- Incumbent Bikash Saikia
- Party: AGP
- Alliance: NDA
- Elected year: 2026

Teok Assembly constituency is one of the 126 electoral constituencies of Assam Legislative Assembly. Teok forms part of the Jorhat Lok Sabha constituency.

== Members of Legislative Assembly ==
Election	Member	Party affiliation
1952	Harinarayan Barua	Indian National Congress
1957	Harinarayan Barua	Indian National Congress
1962	Tilok Gogoi	Indian National Congress
1967	Tilok Gogoi	Indian National Congress
1972	Dulal Chandra Khound	Communist Party of India
1978	Devananda Bora	Janata Party
1983	Tilok Gogoi	Indian National Congress
1985	Lalit Chandra Rajkhowa	Independent
1991	Renupoma Rajkhowa	Asom Gana Parishad
1996	Renupoma Rajkhowa	Asom Gana Parishad
2001	Membor Gogoi	Indian National Congress
2006	Membor Gogoi	Indian National Congress
2011	Membor Gogoi	Indian National Congress
2016	Renupoma Rajkhowa	Asom Gana Parishad
2021	Renupoma Rajkhowa	Asom Gana Parishad
2026	Bikash Saikia	Asom Gana Parishad

== Election results ==
=== 2026 ===
2026 Assam Legislative Assembly election: Teok
Party	Candidate	Votes	%	±%
AGP	Bikash Saikia	90,368	55.84	
INC	Pallabi Saikia Gogoi	67,696	41.83	
NOTA	None of the above	3,777	2.33	
Margin of victory		22,672		
Turnout		161,841		
Rejected ballots				
Registered electors				
gain from		Swing		

=== 2021 ===
2021 Assam Legislative Assembly election: Teok
Party	Candidate	Votes	%	±%
AGP	Renupoma Rajkhowa	47,555	45.78	+2.68
INC	Pallabi Gogoi	46,205	44.48	+7.22
Independent	Kabindra Chetia Phukan	5,956	5.73	N/A
Independent	Simanta Kumar Dutta	1,120	1.08	N/A
LJP	Rubi Neog	1,109	1.07	N/A
NOTA	None of the above	1,927	1.86	+0.21
Majority		1,350	1.3	−4.54
Turnout		1,03,872	75.91	−4.29
Registered electors		1,36,829		
AGP hold		Swing		

=== 2016 ===
2016 Assam Legislative Assembly election: Teok
Party	Candidate	Votes	%	±%
AGP	Renupoma Rajkhowa	40,928	43.10	
INC	Pallabi Saikia Gogoi	35,379	37.26	
Independent	Gojanand Munda	3,923	4.13	
Independent	Bubul Dutta	3,645	3.83	
Independent	Mohendra Gogoi	3,270	3.44	
CPI(ML)L	Jiten Tanti	1,611	1.69	
Independent	Ranjan Jyoti Phukan	1,441	1.51	
Independent	Chiranjit Borah	1,088	1.14	
Independent	Krishnaa Gogoi	811	0.85	
Independent	Ashraf Hussain	753	0.79	
Independent	Jotin Saikia	527	0.55	
NOTA	None of the above	1,570	1.65	
Majority		5,549	5.84	
Turnout		94,946	80.20	
Registered electors		1,18,374		
AGP gain from INC		Swing		
