= Tanu Konwar =

Indian-Assamese politician (1926-1989)

Member of Assam Legislative Assembly
- In office 1988 – 11 August 1989
- Preceded by: Hiteswar Saikia
- Succeeded by: Hiteswar Saikia
- Constituency: Nazira

Personal details
- Born: 1 September 1929 Sivasagar, Assam, British India
- Died: 11 August 1989 (aged 59) Assam, India
- Party: Asom Gana Parishad (1988-1989)
- Spouse: Urmila Konwar
- Children: 8
- Parent: Thanuram Konwar (father)
- Education: Calcutta University, Guwahati University
- Occupation: Educator, journalist, politician

Tanu Konwar (Assamese: তনু কোঁৱৰ; 1 September 1929 - 11 August 1989) was an Indian-Assamese politician and the founder principal of Gargaon College, established in 1959. He was elected to the Assam Legislative Assembly in 1988 from Nazira constituency. He is also the father of Diganta Konwar, former member of the 11-member People's Consultative Group (PCG) established by the United Liberation Front of Assam(ULFA).

== Ancestry and early life ==
Tanu Konwar was the youngest son of Thanuram Konwar, a Bor Mohori of Charaideo Tea Estate. He was born in 1926 at Gasikola village, Dhupabor Mouza. His family had descended from the royal family of Ahom Kingdom.

== Education and career ==
Konwar completed his schooling from Dhole Bagan Middle English School, Nazira English High School and the newly established Namti English High School respectively through undue hardships. While he was studying in class 9 at Nazira English High School, he was arrested for participating in the Indian Freedom Movements led by Mahatma Gandhi. Later, he had to leave the school, he enrolled in Namti English High School and passed his entrance exam with a second division from Calcutta University. His student life in Namti English High School gave him the inspiration to do social service and constructive work. After completing his examination in the year 1945, he enrolled in I-COM at Jorhat's Jagannath Barooah College in 1947 and passed his B-COM examination with honours in 1950 from this college. In 1952, he graduated with an M-COM degree from Guwahati University. He joined Nowgong College and Sibsagar College and taught there after receiving his master's degree. After completing his B-COM, Konwar also taught in Simaluguri High School for a few months.

Late Tanu Konwar's house was a work space of Congress workers. Young student Konwar not only was a Congress worker but was also inspired by Gandhiji's ideals of using domestic products. He was also self employed in many other social reform work. As a party candidate of Congress he was made the President of Nazira Regional Panchayat and Sivasagar Subdivision Council. He was an activist of Upper Assam State Council for a few days.

He contested the Assam Legislative Assembly elections as an independent contestant in the year 1985 and was the first runners up. In 1988, he was elected to Assam Legislative Assembly from Nazira constituency representing the newly formed regional political party Asom Gana Parishad, and also occupied the post of Assam President of National Integration Council. Not only that, he was also the President of "All Assam Teachers' Association" and the member of "Dibrugarh University Academic Council".

== Contributions ==
Educationist Konwar wanted to build educational institutions since childhood, so after completing his I-COM he established a Middle English School at Wakching, Nagaland with his etoil to strengthen the bond of oneness between Assamese and Naga People. He worked there as the unpaid founder head teacher.

The dream of establishing a second higher educational institution at Sivasagar Subdivision made him anxious. Thus, on 23 April 1959, the historic proposal to open a college was adopted at the third annual Piyoli Phukan Memorial Meet held on the banks of Bogidole Pukhuri. Gargaon College established in the year 1959, 7 September, was born mainly to spread the light of knowledge and education in the rural life of Sivasagar Subdivision, idealizing “ simple living and high thinking " and the prestigious historical Ahom capital Gargaon as a source of enlightening. He became the spokesperson of the " Ahom Students’ Conference " and was responsible for editing the magazine " Sangram " from Jorhat published in 1949 for three years. Journalist cum Writer Konwar highlighted the Naga’s and published a number of information rich articles on them in various newspapers and magazines. He was also the advisor of the " Gaonliya Sora " at Guwahati Anatar Kendra. After the arrival of the British, the most important ancestor worship festival of Ahom people “Me-Dam-Me-Phi“ was not organized due to many setbacks until February 7, 1971. Me-Dam-Me-Phi was observed again in Gargaon Kareng Ghar with the help of the then Principal of Gargaon College Tanu Konwar, lecturers, students, and the public. Since then the festival has been celebrated every year from the year 1985 when the Assam Government declared January 31 as a local holiday in the districts of Upper Assam and then finally declared it as a state holiday.
