= Sarumotoria =

Sarumotoria is a locality near Dispur, the capital of the Indian state of Assam. It is located northeast of Guwahati-Shillong (G.S.) Road.
