= Hiteswar Saikia =

10th Chief Minister of Assam

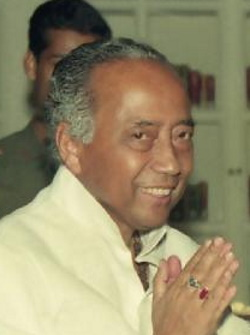
- Saikia in August 1994

10th Chief Minister of Assam
- In office 30 June 1991 – 22 April 1996
- Governor: Lokanath Misra
- Deputy: Gobinda Chandra Langthasa
- Preceded by: Prafulla Kumar Mahanta
- Succeeded by: Bhumidhar Barman
- In office 28 February 1983 – 23 December 1985
- Governor: Prakash Mehrotra; Tribeni Sahai Misra; Bhishma Narain Singh
- Preceded by: Keshab Chandra Gogoi
- Succeeded by: Prafulla Kumar Mahanta

1st Governor of Mizoram
- In office 20 February 1987 – 30 April 1989
- Chief Minister: Laldenga; Lal Thanhawla
- Preceded by: Office Established (Himself as Lieutenant Governor)
- Succeeded by: K. V. Krishna Rao

6th Lieutenant Governor of Mizoram
- In office 11 December 1986 – 19 February 1987
- Chief Minister: Laldenga
- Preceded by: H. S. Dubey
- Succeeded by: Office Abolished (Himself as Governor)

Minister for Education
- In office January 1982 – March 1982
- Chief Minister: Keshab Chandra Gogoi

Minister for Education
- In office December 1980 – June 1981
- Chief Minister: Anwara Taimur

Home Minister
- In office 1974–1978
- Chief Minister: Sarat Chandra Singha

Minister of State for Home, Education and Public Relations
- In office May 1972 – March 1974
- Chief Minister: Sarat Chandra Singha

Member of Assam Legislative Assembly
- In office 1991–1996
- Preceded by: Tanu Konwar
- Succeeded by: Hemoprova Saikia
- Constituency: Nazira
- In office 1972–1988
- Preceded by: K.K. Gogoi
- Succeeded by: Tanu Konwar
- Constituency: Nazira

Personal details
- Born: 3 October 1934 Sivasagar, Assam Province, British India
- Died: 22 April 1996 (aged 61) New Delhi, India
- Cause of death: Cardiac arrest
- Party: Indian National Congress
- Spouse: Hemoprova Saikia
- Children: 3, including Debabrata Saikia
- Parent: Haladhar Saikia (father)
- Relatives: Membor Gogoi (brother in law)
- Education: Cotton College; University of Lucknow (M.A. History, 1959)
- Occupation: Politician
- Website: www.debabratasaikia.in/debabrata-legacy-karmoshri-hiteshwar-saikia/

Hiteswar Saikia (3 October 1934 – 22 April 1996) was an Indian politician who served as the 10th chief minister of Assam from 1983 to 1985 and again from 1991 to 1996. He became the 1st Governor of Mizoram from 1987 to 1989, and was previously the 6th Lieutenant Governor of Mizoram from 1986 to 1987. In 1980 he was appointed as the Minister of Education for the Government of Assam, a post he held until 1981 although he assumed the role again in 1982. Earlier he had been the Minister of State for Home, Education and Public Relations between 1972 and 1974. He also held the post of Minister for Home-Affairs from 1974 to 1978. He represented the Nazira constituency in the Assam Legislative Assembly from 1972 to 1988 and again from 1991 to 1996.

== Early life, family and education ==
Saikia was born on 3 October 1934 at Bogabagh Tea Estate to Haladhar Saikia (1896–1988) in a Chutia family. His sister Aimoni married Membor Gogoi who served as Member of Assam Legislative Assembly for Teok.

From his childhood, Saikia was drawn to the non-cooperative movement launched by Mahatma Gandhi. To join the movement he gave up going to school. At that time he was just a boy studying in Class IX (9). His father influenced his career at almost all the turning points of his early life. It was his father who made him go to Lucknow for postgraduate studies where he earned his Master's Degree in History from Lucknow University in 1959.

As a result of his father's matchmaking, Saikia married Dr. Hemoprova, who later succeeded Saikia as MLA of Nazira and became a minister in the First Tarun Gogoi cabinet. Saikia's eldest son Debabrata Saikia entered politics in 2011 and became the leader of the opposition in the Assam Legislative Assembly, where he served from 2016 until 2026.

== Early political career ==
=== Early Congress activities (1958–1974) ===
Although Hiteswar Saikia wasn't in the front rank of the leadership as Assam became swept away by the tide of two big political movements, namely The Oil Refinery movement of 1958 and The State Language movement, he managed by dint of his organizing capacity to catch the attention of discerning eyes. Saikia joined the All India Congress Committee on 15 August 1964.

At that time Saikia was given responsibility for leading Congress's youth-wing. He became very popular and contested the Assembly election from his home constituency at Nazira, a small township situated near the ancient capital of the Ahom kings at Gargaon in the district of Sivasagar, Assam.

=== Home Minister (1974–1978) ===
Following his election Saikia was brought into the newly formed Sarat Chandra Sinha Ministry. He was given a junior rank as a minister of state and in 1972 assumed responsibility for the three portfolios of Home, Education and Public relations.

In 1974 the Chief Minister, Mr. Sarat Chandra Sinha, rewarded him as a minister of Cabinet rank with the all-important Home portfolio entrusted to his person. This was a decisive turning point in his career. During his time as the Vice-Principal of the college where he had taught history he was destined to hold the education portfolio for three terms of office. He first assumed responsibility under the chief minister of Sarat Chandra Sinha between May 1972 and March 1974.

Saikia made far-reaching changes towards raising the status of police officers and of ordinary constables. He revamped the department so as to be rid of many former colonial hangovers dating back to British rule. In this way his changes allowed for a battalion of uniformed persons to be true sentinels of the law. He established the Forensic Laboratory at Guwahati, the capital of Assam and set up the 'single digit fingerprint bureau'. He turned his attention toward bifurcating the Criminal Intelligence Department through creating a Special Branch that was to be run independently. Thereafter he improved the functioning of the 'Assam Police Radio Organization' by modernising its equipment. Finally, he established a separate training centre for the armed police. But soon some cracks developed in the alliance.

=== Later activities and Education Minister (1978–1982) ===
Just a few months before the withdrawal of the President's rule in Assam Saikia parted ways with Sarat Chandra Sinha. He joined Congress (I) in 1980 and was sounded out as to his possible taking-over of the leadership of the party. On several occasions he was approached, but he declined the honour. Saikia's political maturity and organizing ability eventually caught the eye of Indira Gandhi. When the expiry date of the President's rule was approaching it seemed that a constitutional crisis was about to appear on Assam's political horizon. However, Indira Gandhi came to Assam to evaluate the whole situation and was able to resolve the debacle.

Under a stop-gap measure the Chief Minister, Syeda Anwara Taimur re-appointed him in December 1980 whereupon he was to remain in his post until June 1981. There then occurred another stop-gap measure between January and March 1982 when he served under Chief Minister, Keshab Gogoi.

During the Ministry of Keshab Chandra Gogoi Saikia was placed in charge of the Education portfolio. He introduced far reaching changes in Assam's field of education. First he created a separate 'Directorate for Elementary Education'. Secondly, he introduced the idea of what is termed 'provincialization of high schools'. In the wake of provincialization about 2,500 privately run government-aided high schools came under the direct administration of the government; a measure benefitting both students and teachers financially. He also made available liberal grants to help advance teachers in their careers, especially in language-based subjects.

== First term as Chief Minister (1983–1985) ==
=== 1983 election and appointment ===
In 1983 Saikia became Chief Minister for the first time as opposition boycotted the polls. The Congress Legislature Party elected Hiteswar Saikia as the leader of the party. The Governor of Assam asked him to form his government. After the swearing-in ceremony Saikia refrained from performing the normally seen activity of allotting the chambers to his ministers. He made them meet together and apportioned duties to all the ministers to various troubled areas as well as personally supervising relief operations to assess the situations under threat.

=== Assam movement ===
Assam was experiencing a political climate which appeared to be very different from that of the heart of India. Then Indira Gandhi observed that only hope lay in bringing the AASU leadership to the negotiating table. She felt that Saikia was the man who could fulfill this task at any cost. He drew up a blue print of his own guidance and for his ministerial colleagues so as to take the necessary steps.

The meaning of such a blue print required control of the law and order situation which had been on the fringe of anarchy. It also necessitated urgent means to contain communal and ethnic violence and to provide immediate relief and succour to the victims of senseless violence. In addition, there were plans to manoeuvre the AASU leaders back to the negotiating table, and also to inspire confidence among sections of the people who wanted to keep distant from the agitators.

The measure of Saikia's success in the matter may be obtained from the spontaneous words of appreciation in the speech of the Prime Minister herself. Then, Prime Minister Rajiv Gandhi came forward to fulfill the half-finished work of his mother. Turning his attention to the problems relating to the Assam movement, he tried bringing the AASU leaders to the negotiating table. To make everything fruitful, Saikia tried at his best. Hence, his steps and attitudes enabled Rajiv Gandhi to get the Assam Accord signed by the AASU at midnight on the eve of 15 August 1985. It drew the final curtain over the last scene of the long six years of the Assam movement.

In terms of guaranteeing law and order Saikia allegedly orchestrated a number of "surrenders" of ULFA operatives; the success of which emboldened the trust of the public in his policies.

=== Health issues ===
Earlier there had been signs of Saikia's health being placed into question. It was detected in a medical check-up how both his kidneys were damaged. He was advised to obtain a kidney transplantation. Finally, in the Brigham Women Hospital in the US, he underwent a successful operation carried out by the best expert in the field at that time on 25 June 1981.

It was his youngest brother who donated one of his kidneys for the purpose. He returned home in October, 1981. After that he joined the ministry under Keshab Chandra Gogoi in the early part of 1982. As the Keshab Chandra Gogoi ministry collapsed no sooner than had it been formed he had to convince his supporters and critics how all his promises could still be fulfilled.

== Mizoram governor (1986–1989) ==
=== Appointment ===
Attaining success in Assam by getting the Assam Accord signed, Prime Minister Rajiv Gandhi turned his attention to Mizoram. There he had similar problems to that of Assam both in dimension and in nature. The Government of India had been tired of facing violence in that Union Territory as unleashed by Laldenga, the leader of the Mizo National Front (MNF) for quite a number of years.

Encouraged by the signing of the Assam Accord, Rajiv Gandhi aimed to sign a similar Mizo Accord. Saikia was appointed the Lt. Governor of Mizoram. In such an Indian setting to ask an ex-Chief Minister to become a Governor usually signifies retirement. But little did his critics know how he took to the post as a means of regeneration.

=== Tenure ===
Saikia worked in unison with two definite targets fixed by the Mizo Accord. Firstly, he had to bring peace to the troubled region. Secondly, he had to fulfill the dream of the Mizo people to gain for their territory the status of a full-scale statehood. He did achieve both in time, and renewed confidence and trust in the people. Mizoram experienced a shift away from its earlier characterization as an “exotic land of mountains and militants.” Saikia identified and engaged with the grievances of the Mizo people.

Once the proper wavelength was found communication became easier with a number of solutions. When the Prime Minister himself came to Aizawl on 19 February and declared Statehood for Mizoram, Saikia was praised as the Lt. Governor and was elevated to the higher rank of the Governor. The whole of the Mizoram rejoiced in great merriment.

When a popular government was installed in Mizoram, Governor Saikia found sometime to move in both inside and outside of the state. At the same time he received an invitation from the Principal of St. Edmund's College at Shillong on the occasion of its Golden Jubilee celebration. During the visit to the Don Bosco School at Shillong on 5 July 1987 Saikia took keen interest in vocational training classes.

After the long stay at Mizoram, Saikia acquired a new virtue of his character. When his resigning letter was accepted, people of Mizoram bid him a hearty farewell.

== Second term as Chief Minister (1991–1996) ==
=== 1991 election and appointment ===
The Assam movement demanded the expulsion of all foreigners whose number had been estimated to be several lakhs. This gained momentum and the AASU was on the forefront of the movement. When Saikia came back from Mizoram to play his role in Assam politics he was appointed by the President of the APCC (I) by Rajiv Gandhi. He intended to send the opposite team of Asom Gana Parishad which entered into the tail-phase of electoral procedures. The 1991 general election was witness to great turmoil and constituted a grave danger to Saikia's life.

Saikia was doubly sure of the victory of Congress (I). He waited to disclose the anticipation of a resounding victory till the arrival of Rajiv Gandhi who was to visit Assam for releasing the Congress(I) election manifesto. Rajiv Gandhi was fully convinced with the strategies of Saikia and gave him all the responsibility of electioneering in the entire State.

Saikia undertook extensive tour of the villages rather than visiting towns and nearby cities. He knew how Indian villages represented an all important electoral source. After the Assam election and the assassination of Rajiv Gandhi, the election result came out in Assam in favour of Congress. This was due in part to Saikia's ability to retrieve the people's confidence in Congress. He was then elected from his home constituency for the fifth consecutive term.

=== ULFA crisis and resolution ===
When the militant organization ULFA kidnapped fourteen top ranking officials serving directly under the Government of Assam Saikia was prepared to negotiate their release in exchange for a certain number of their comrades-at-arms. The latter had been arrested under the Terrorist and Disruptive Activities (Prevention) Act during an earlier Army operation known as 'Operation Bajrang.'

In such a situation Chief Minister Saikia made an offer of general amnesty and, by way of touching wood, he went to the extent of releasing a good number of ULFA detainees against whom there were no specific charges. Meanwhile, Saikia managed to employ go-betweens able to win the confidence of the ULFA leaders. As behind the scene negotiations dragged on this led in the end to some very hard bargaining.

Saikia took an off the track decision, thereby giving in effect the idea of granting a general amnesty which he expected to be unilaterally reciprocated by the ULFA through an immediate release of the hostages. He went on air on 8 July 1991, announcing his proposal for meaningful talks with the militant organisation. Eager for a permanent solution he suggested an end to the problem within the framework of the Indian constitution.

Prime Minister P. V. Narasimha Rao threw his weight behind Saikia, although government policy differed basically with that of the Govt of Punjab which had to deal with a similar problem. The ULFA reciprocated the liberal gesture of the government by releasing most of the hostages but by no means all. The backdrop of the ULFA's rebelliousness through an abuse of people's faith in legally constituted government was beginning to diminish.

CM Saikia had been compelled to look for both expedient and pragmatic measures in his approach to the crisis. He called for the assistance of the Army for the restoration of peace and order in the State. 'Operation Rhino' was then launched. This was the Indian Army's second operation. It had been named in contrast to its earlier undertaking, namely 'Operation Bajrang'. It succeeded exactly where the earlier operation had failed. It destroyed many ULFA training camps, captured a considerable number of militant soldiers and also unearthed great many warehouses of arms and ammunition.

By the middle of January, 1992, there had been a change of climate in the civic life of Assam. The ULFA came forward with its expressed desire for a discussion towards finding a permanent solution. It resolved to settle its grievances within the framework of the Indian constitution. Chief Minister Saikia welcomed the change of mood and responded to it richly. At the same time he gave guarantees to those militants who would come forward to surrender themselves together with their arms and ammunition.

Everyone felt to the bones that peace and security had returned to the State. Everyone acknowledged the spirit of tolerance and forgiveness displayed by Chief Minister Saikia in bringing round most of the ULFA militants to the path of sanity. However, certain other parts of Assam began to feel the impact of violence by some other groups of terrorists.

=== Other activities ===
Another crisis loomed as the joint leadership of the ABSU and BPAC voiced their demands. However, all of a sudden the BSF came to the forefront whose aim was to achieve an independent Bodoland. The BSF believed in armed struggle as a necessary means. Saikia solved the problem which one may identify as a yearning for some kind of mini-India everywhere throughout the country. The Bodo's celebrated the occasion of a peaceful solution with great jubilation.

Turning his attention to the need of streamlining his liaison wing with persons of indisputable trust Saikia drafted the services of Robin Choudhury, who was his Press and Publicity Adviser. Within three months of the Saikia Government's coming to power, a consistently descending curve in the State's crime rate with reference to political murder became starkly visible.

Perhaps in emulation of the earlier teachings of Mahatma Gandhi Saikia recognized how repentance is everything. In terms of Assam's economy the province is dependent on keeping the three resource oriented industries on an even keel. These three industries are always referred to in terms of gold, that is green gold (tea), liquid gold (petroleum) and black gold (coal). Saikia took steps towards getting business to act in the form of an auction market which opened at Guwahati. The fourth Oil Refinery in Assam that was in Numaligarh had its issues addressed by Saikia. As someone who had earlier recognised rural life as the mainstay of his political support it was a challenging time for him to recognised the needs of Big Business and industry.

Saikia, still in his role as Chief Minister, invited the Prime Minister to lay the foundation stone of the Numaligarh refinery on 3 July 1992. Around the same time he didn't forget to voice his views on education and campaigned for the opening up of two Universities simultaneously at Tezpur and Silchar. He went to Delhi and returned with the necessary approval for starting both universities. In this way he was acclaimed to be the every inch of a practical politician - a man who consistently worked to the very last tip of his fingers.

=== Manmohan Singh residence controversy ===
Saikia was a close friend and associate of Manmohan Singh, the future Prime Minister of India. In fact, Singh became a Rajya Sabha MP from the Assam quota. He claimed he was a resident of Assam by producing a house rent receipt from Saikia's wife Smt. Hemoprabha Saikia. According to an affidavit submitted by Manmohan Singh, the prime minister was alleged to have rented Saikia's house at Sarumotoria by paying a monthly rent of 700 Rupees.

=== Death ===
As his transplanted kidney was failing fast, Saikia's recurrent fever refused to go away. He was finding it more difficult to breathe. Doctors insisted he should take a rest but Saikia refused and continued his post-political career until his untimely demise on 22 April 1996 of a cardiac arrest at the All India Institute of Medical Sciences, at the age of 61. On the day of his funeral, a Phuraluong Lue Dam worship rite of the Ahom religion was performed by Nagen Hazarika with other Mo'-Luongs or religious priests.

== Awards and recognition ==
Saikia went on facing all the problems for the solution of which he had to depend on his own resources of intelligence during his Chief Ministership. All his labour brought forth certain recognition on the national level. In an editorial of The Times of India (15.7.1983) Saikia was highly appreciated. There were many others who echoed this feeling about his achievements throughout his long and spirited career.

- Doctorate (honoris causa), University of Lucknow, 1992
