= BSF (time service) =

Time signal radio station in Taiwan

BSF is the callsign of the time signal transmitter owned by the National Time and Frequency Standards Laboratory of the Ministry of Economic Affairs (Taiwan), which transmits time information on 77.5 kHz in the longwave range. It was launched on May 1, 1969 and is broadcast from Zhongli District in Taichung using a T-antenna located at 25°0′20″N 121°21′54″E.

The station used to also transmit on shortwave frequencies of 5 MHz and 15 MHz, but this was discontinued due to "low demand" as of July 1, 2004.

== Longwave transmitter ==
The longwave transmitter of the station uses 1 kW of power, achieving an effective radiated power of 460 W. Each second, two bits of information are transmitted using pulse-width modulation, making 120 bits per minute.

The pulses are themselves transmitted once per second via amplitude-shift keying similar to other low frequency time signal stations, reducing the carrier amplitude by 10 dB on the second, and encoding information via the time when it is restored. Uniquely, however, BSF uses five possible times to communicate two data bits per second, or a special synchronization mark:

- No reduced power and 1.0 s of full power means SYNC, a synchronization mark
- 0.2 seconds of reduced power and 0.8 s of full power means 00
- 0.4 seconds of reduced power and 0.6 s of full power means 01
- 0.6 seconds of reduced power and 0.4 s of full power means 11
- 0.8 seconds of reduced power and 0.2 s of full power means 10

Note that the data is Gray coded so that confusion between 0.4 and 0.6 seconds of full power will only corrupt one data bit, and thus be detectable by the parity bits.

Each minute is divided into two blocks. The first 40 seconds are used to broadcast 76 bits of non-time information (weather, disaster warnings, etc.), and the last 20 seconds are used to broadcast the time, as follows:

BSF time code
| Second | Weight | Meaning | Second | Weight | Meaning | Second | Weight | Meaning |
| :00 | 0 | Always 00 | :40 | 0 | Always 01 | :50 | 2 | Day of week 0–6 |
| :00 | 0 | Always 00 | :40 | 1 | Always 01 | :50 | 1 | Day of week 0–6 |
| :01 ︙ :38 | Other information (76 bits) | | :41 | 32 | Minutes; 00–59 | :51 | 8 | Month; 1–12 |
| :01 ︙ :38 | Other information (76 bits) | | :41 | 16 | Minutes; 00–59 | :51 | 4 | Month; 1–12 |
| :01 ︙ :38 | Other information (76 bits) | | :42 | 8 | Minutes; 00–59 | :52 | 2 | Month; 1–12 |
| :01 ︙ :38 | Other information (76 bits) | | :42 | 4 | Minutes; 00–59 | :52 | 1 | Month; 1–12 |
| :01 ︙ :38 | Other information (76 bits) | | :43 | 2 | Minutes; 00–59 | :53 | 64 | Year; 00–99 |
| :01 ︙ :38 | Other information (76 bits) | | :43 | 1 | Minutes; 00–59 | :53 | 32 | Year; 00–99 |
| :01 ︙ :38 | Other information (76 bits) | | :44 | 16 | Hours; 00–23 | :54 | 16 | Year; 00–99 |
| :01 ︙ :38 | Other information (76 bits) | | :44 | 8 | Hours; 00–23 | :54 | 8 | Year; 00–99 |
| :01 ︙ :38 | Other information (76 bits) | | :45 | 4 | Hours; 00–23 | :55 | 4 | Year; 00–99 |
| :01 ︙ :38 | Other information (76 bits) | | :45 | 2 | Hours; 00–23 | :55 | 2 | Year; 00–99 |
| :01 ︙ :38 | Other information (76 bits) | | :46 | 1 | Hours; 00–23 | :56 | 1 | Year; 00–99 |
| :01 ︙ :38 | Other information (76 bits) | | :46 | P1 | Time parity | :56 | P2 | Date parity |
| :01 ︙ :38 | Other information (76 bits) | | :47 | 16 | Day of month 1–31 | :57 | ? | Leap second warning |
| :01 ︙ :38 | Other information (76 bits) | | :47 | 8 | Day of month 1–31 | :57 | ? | Leap second warning |
| :01 ︙ :38 | Other information (76 bits) | | :48 | 4 | Day of month 1–31 | :58 | 0 | DST (unused) |
| :01 ︙ :38 | Other information (76 bits) | | :48 | 2 | Day of month 1–31 | :58 | 0 | DST (unused) |
| :39 | SYNC | Marker | :49 | 1 | Day of month 1–31 | :59 | SYNC | Marker |
| :39 | SYNC | Marker | :49 | 4 | Day of week | :59 | SYNC | Marker |

The minute-of-day and day-of-century blocks each contain an even parity bit. Although bits are reserved for daylight saving time information, they are currently always broadcast as zero, as Taiwan does not observe DST.

The time code only includes two digits of year, but it is possible to handle the 400-year leap year cycle in the Gregorian calendar using the day of week information.

It is not currently clear if the time is transmitted during the minute it encodes (like WWVB) or just before (like DCF77).

== Shortwave transmitter (continued) ==
Until July 2004, the shortwave transmitter on 5 MHz operated continuously, while that on 15 MHz had an interruption from 35 to 40 minutes after the hour. Except for this, the broadcast repeated every 10 minutes.

Each second was marked with a 5 ms tick of 1000 Hz tone, amplitude modulated. At the start of each minute, the tick was lengthened to 300 ms. DUT1 was transmitted by doubling some ticks: seconds :01 through :08 for DUT1 of +0.1 through +0.8 seconds, and seconds :09 through :16 for DUT1 from −0.1 through −0.8 seconds.

Each tick was preceded and followed by 40 ms of silence. The remaining "background" was filled on a 10-minute schedule:

- For the first 5 minutes (:x0:00 through :x4:59), a background 1000 Hz tone was transmitted.
- For the next 4 minutes (:x5:00 through :x8:59), no background tone was transmitted, only the ticks.
- During minute 9 (:x9:00 through :x9:59), voice call sign and time announcements were made in Taiwanese Mandarin.

This schedule repeated every ten minutes, on the hour, except for the previously mentioned 5-minute interruption on 15 MHz.
