= Ataxia-telangiectasia group D complementing =

Ataxia-telangiectasia group D complementing (ATDC) is a gene implicated in ataxia-telangiectasia.

It is involved in a mouse model of pancreatic cancer.
