= Kuladhar Chaliha =

Indian freedom fighter and politician (1887–1963)

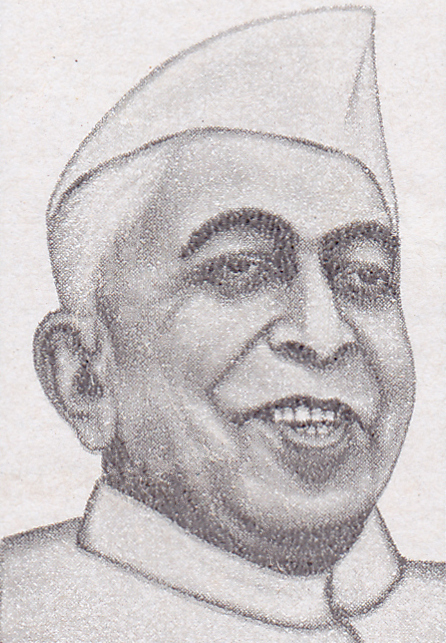
Kuladhar Chaliha from a 1988 stamp of India

Kuladhar Chaliha (20 September 1887 in Sivasagar – 19 January 1963) was a prominent freedom fighter and leader of Assam from the Indian National Congress. Chaliha played a significant role in the Indian independence movement, led by Mahatma Gandhi. Chaliha was one of the elected members of the 1934 Indian general election from the state of Assam.

== Early life and education ==
Kuladhar Chaliha was born on 20 September 1887 in Sivasagar, Assam. He studied at Cotton College, Guwahati and later at Presidency College, Kolkata, where he studied law.

== Political career ==
Chaliha started his career as an extra assistant commissioner in the Assam Civil Service in 1913. He resigned shortly after due to disagreement with the policies of the British government. He joined the opium prohibition movement and then the Bar at Jorhat court, where he was soon recognized to be a promising advocate.

After the Jalianwala Bagh massacre in 1919, Chaliha joined the Indian independence movement under the leadership of Mahatma Gandhi. He became the first president of the Assam Pradesh Congress Committee and was a member of the All India Congress Committee. He was convicted and imprisoned in 1921 for his involvement in the Indian freedom movement for one year alongside many of his Congress party colleagues. Chaliha was elected to the Assam Legislative Council in 1927. He was later elected to the Assam Legislative Assembly, and became the first speaker of the Assembly from 5 March 1952 to 7 June 1957. Chaliha's interventions in the Assembly mainly revolved around the administration of tribal areas.

Chaliha is considered to be one of the most prominent freedom fighters during the British occupation of India.

== Honor and legacy ==
The government of India issued a stamp in 1988, commemorating the occasion of his birth centenary.

Former Chief Minister of Assam, Tarun Gogoi, released a biography of Chaliha, titled Deshneta Kuladhar Chaliha in 2013, the year of his 125th birth anniversary and 50th death anniversary.
