= 1957 Assam Legislative Assembly election =

Indian state election

- 25 February 1957

All 108 seats in the Assam Legislative Assembly 55 seats needed for a majority
- Registered: 5,553,926
- Turnout: 45.44%
	Majority party	Minority party	Third party
	INC	PSP	CPI
Party	INC	PSP	CPI
Seats before	76	New	1
Seats won	71	8	4
Seat change	▼5	New	▲3
Popular vote	52.35%	12.74%	8.10%
CM before election
Bishnuram Medhi
INC
Elected CM
Bishnuram Medhi
INC

Elections to the Assam Legislative Assembly were held on 25 February 1957. 312 candidates contested for the 94 constituencies in the Assembly. There were 14 two-member constituencies and 80 single-member constituencies. Subsequently, the Third Medhi ministry was sworn in for office.

== Results ==
Results by Party

Party	Popular vote			Seats		
Party	Vote	%	+/-	Contested	Won	+/-
Indian National Congress	13,21,367	52.35	▲8.87	101	71	▼5
Praja Socialist Party	3,21,569	12.74	▲12.74	36	8	▲8
Communist Party of India	2,04,332	8.10	▲5.26	22	4	▲3
Independent	676,698	26.81	▼1.53	153	25	▲11
Total	25,23,966	100	—	312	108	▲3

== Elected members ==
Constituency	Reserved for (SC/ST/None)	Member	Party
Lungleh	ST	C. Thumluaia	Independent
Aijal East	ST	Lalmawia	Independent
Aijal West	ST	A. Thanglura	Independent
Patharkandi	SC	Upadhyaya, Biswanath	Independent
Patharkandi	SC	Gopesh Namasudra	Communist Party of India
Karimganj South	None	Chowdhury, Abdul Hamid	Indian National Congress
Karimganj North	None	Das, Ranendra Mohan	Praja Socialist Party
Badarpur	None	Choudhury, Moulana Md. Abdul Jalil	Indian National Congress
Hailakandi	None	Majumdar, Abdul Matlib	Indian National Congress
Katlicherra	None	Roy, Gouri Shankar	Indian National Congress
Silchar West	None	Chanda, Jyotsna	Indian National Congress
Silchar East	None	Choudhury, Moinul Haque	Indian National Congress
Katigora	None	Chakravarty, Hem Chandra	Indian National Congress
Udarband	None	Barlaskar, Tazamulali	Indian National Congress
Lakhipur	None	Choubey, Ram Prasad	Indian National Congress
Sonai	None	Sinha, Nanda Kishore	Indian National Congress
Mokokchung	ST	Ao, Chubatemsu, I	Independent
Naga Hills Central	ST	Sema, Khelhose	Independent
Kohima	ST	Angami, Satsuo	Independent
Mikir Hills East	ST	Terang, Sai Sai	Independent
Mikir Hills West	ST	Teron, Chatrasing	Indian National Congress
North Cachar Hills	ST	Hamdhan, Mohan	Independent
Jowai	ST	Khyriem, Larsingh	Independent
Nongpoh	ST	Siem, Jormanik	Independent
Shillong	None	Roy, Brojo Mohon	Independent
Nongstoin	ST	Cotton, Henry	Independent
Cherrapunji	ST	Nichols, Roy J. J. M.	Independent
Baghmara	ST	Momin, Emerson	Independent
Tura	ST	Narak, Mody K.	Independent
Phulbari	ST	Sangma, Williamson A.	Independent
Dainadubi	ST	Momin, Harison	Independent
Mankachar	None	Ahmed, Kobad Hussain	Indian National Congress
South Salmara	None	Ali, Md. Sahadat	Praja Socialist Party
Goalpara	ST	Rabha, Hakim Chandra	Indian National Congress
Goalpara	ST	Nath, Khagendra Nath	Indian National Congress
North Salmara	SC	Das, Hareswar	Indian National Congress
North Salmara	SC	Dr. Das, Ghanashyam	Indian National Congress
Kokrajar	ST	Brahma, Rupnath	Indian National Congress
Kokrajar	ST	Brahmachari, Swami Krishnananda	Indian National Congress
Gossaigaon	None	Tudu, Mathias	Independent
Golakganj	None	Pradhani, Bhuban Chandra	Indian National Congress
Dhubri	None	Pradhani, Tamijuddin	Indian National Congress
Gauripur	None	Barua, Prakritish Chandra	Independent
Bilasipara	None	Ahmed, Jahanuddin	Praja Socialist Party
Tarabari	None	Tajuddin Ahmed	Praja Socialist Party
Jania	None	Fakhruddin Ali Ahmed	Indian National Congress
Sorbhog	None	Talukdar, Ghaneshyam	Independent
Barpeta	SC	Das, Srihari	Praja Socialist Party
Barpeta	SC	Das, Mahadev	Indian National Congress
Kamalpur	ST	Goswami, Sarat Chandra	Indian National Congress
Gauhati	None	Bhattacharjya, Gouri Sankar	Communist Party of India
Palasbari	None	Das, Radhika Ram	Indian National Congress
Boko	None	Chaudhury, Radha Charan	Indian National Congress
Rampur	None	Goswami, Hareswar	Praja Socialist Party
Hajo	None	Medhi, Bisnu Ram	Indian National Congress
Nalbari West	None	Deka, Tarun Sen	Communist Party of India
Nalbari East	None	Choudhury, Prabhat Narayan	Praja Socialist Party
Mangaldai	None	Datta, Dandi Ram	Indian National Congress
Panery	ST	Patowari, Hiralal	Independent
Panery	ST	Deka, Pakhirai	Independent
Dalgaon	None	Md. Matlebuddin	Independent
Dhekiajuli	None	Das, Omeo Kumar	Indian National Congress
Barchalla	None	Das, Mahi Kanta	Indian National Congress
Balipara	None	Sarma, Biswadeb	Indian National Congress
Tezpur	None	Agarwalla, Kamala Prasad	Indian National Congress
Biswanath	None	Tripathi, Kamakhya Prasad	Indian National Congress
Gohpur	None	Upadhaya, Bishnulal	Indian National Congress
Laharighat	ST	Deori, Dhirsingh	Indian National Congress
Laharighat	ST	Bora, Motiram	Indian National Congress
Dhing	None	Nurul Islam	Indian National Congress
Rupohihat	None	Idris, Maulavi Md.	Indian National Congress
Kaliabor	None	Borah, Lila Kanta	Indian National Congress
Patacharkuchi	None	Das, Birendra Kumar	Praja Socialist Party
Patacharkuchi	None	Das, Surendra Nath	Indian National Congress
Rangiya	ST	Sarma, Siddhinath	Indian National Congress
Rangiya	ST	Das, Baikuntha Nath	Indian National Congress
Samaguri	None	Barthakur, Usha	Indian National Congress
Nowgong	SC	Dev Kanta Borooah	Indian National Congress
Nowgong	SC	Hazarika, Mahendra Nath	Indian National Congress
Jamunamukh	None	Ahmed, Maulavi Rahimuddin	Indian National Congress
Lumding	None	Sarma, Ram Nath	Indian National Congress
Marangi	None	Hazarika, Dandeswar	Indian National Congress
Golaghat	None	Barua, Rajendranath	Indian National Congress
Dergaon	SC	Das, Ramnath	Indian National Congress
Dergaon	SC	Sarma, Narendra Nath	Indian National Congress
Titabar	None	Bardoloi, Sarbeswar	Indian National Congress
Teok	None	Barua, Harinarayan	Indian National Congress
Amguri	None	Borborua, Khagendranath	Independent
Nazira	None	Tankeswar Chetia	Indian National Congress
Sonari	None	Purnananda Chetia	Indian National Congress
Thowra	None	Saikia, Durgeswar	Indian National Congress
Sibsagar	None	Girindra Nath Gogoi	Indian National Congress
Jorhat	ST	Pegoo, Mahidhar	Indian National Congress
Jorhat	ST	Sarmah, Debeswar	Indian National Congress
Katonigaon	None	Barua, Komal, Kumari	Indian National Congress
North Lakhimpur	ST	Bora, Mahanonda	Indian National Congress
North Lakhimpur	ST	Doley, Karka Chandra	Indian National Congress
Moran	ST	Daley, Lalit Kumar	Indian National Congress
Moran	ST	Gohain, Padma Kumari	Indian National Congress
Dibrugarh	None	Barthakur, Nilmoni	Communist Party of India
Lahowal	None	Sengupta, Lily	Indian National Congress
Tengakhat	None	Das, Manik Chandra	Indian National Congress
Jaipur	None	Barua, Jugo Kanta	Indian National Congress
Bogdung	None	Khaund, Indreswar	Indian National Congress
Tinsukia	None	Khemka, Radha Kishen	Indian National Congress
Digboi	None	Deb Sarma, Dwijesh Chandra	Indian National Congress
Doom Dooma	None	Tati, Molia	Indian National Congress
Saikhowa	None	Hazarika, Devendra Nath	Indian National Congress

== See also ==
- 1957 elections in India
- 1952 Assam Legislative Assembly election
