= Uday Shankar Hazarika =

Indian politician

Uday Shankar Hazarika (born 1958) is an Indian politician from Assam. He is a member of the Indian National Congress and was the party's candidate in the 2024 Indian general election from Lakhimpur Lok Sabha constituency. Hazarika was formerly a senior leader of the Bharatiya Janata Party (BJP) in Assam, and was the BJP's candidate in the 1998, 1999, and 2004 general elections from Lakhimpur.

== Early life ==
Uday Shankar Hazarika is the son of Dimbeshwar Hazarika. He is a resident of North Lakhimpur, Assam. After studying at North Lakhimpur College, Hazarika graduated from Dibrugarh University in 1983. Hazarika has served as the president of the Lakhimpur District Chambers of Commerce.

== Political career ==
As a member of the Bharatiya Janata Party, Hazarika contested in the 1998 Indian general election from Lakhimpur, finishing third with 1,30,298 votes (19.41pc) behind second-placed Arun Kumar Sarmah of the Asom Gana Parishad (1,48,012 votes, 22.05pc). Hazarika stood as a candidate in Lakhimpur again in 1999, finishing third with 1,84,533 votes (24.81pc) behind second-placed Sarbananda Sonowal of the Asom Gana Parishad (2,01,402 votes, 27.08pc). In 2004, Hazarika ran as the Bharatiya Janata Party's candidate for a third consecutive occasion, finishing third with 1,69,123 votes (21.1pc) behind second-placed Ranee Narah of the Indian National Congress (2,72,717 votes, 34.1pc). On December 20, 2023, Hazarika joined the Indian National Congress. In 2024, Hazarika was nominated as the Indian National Congress candidate for Lakhimpur in the 2024 Indian general election. In the general elections, Hazarika received 4,61,865 votes (38.13pc), finishing second behind the Bharatiya Janata Party candidate, Pradan Baruah, who received 6,63,122 (54.75pc) votes.
