= Bharat Narah =

Indian politician

Bharat Chandra Narah
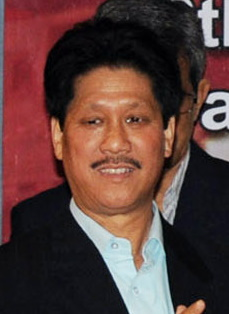
- Narah in 2011

Cabinet Minister, Government of Assam
- In office 2 December 2012 – 24 May 2016; 17 May 2001 – 18 May 2011
- Chief Minister: Tarun Gogoi
- Departments: Tribal Affairs/Welfare of Plain Tribes & Backward Classes (2001–2006); Public Works Department (2001–2006); Flood Control/Fisheries/Water Resources (2001–2008); Co-operation (2001–2011); Parliamentary Affairs (2001–2011); State Co-operatives (2006–2011); Cultural Affairs (2008–2011); Sports & Youth Welfare (2008–2011); Press Advisor (2012–2016)
- In office 1 January 1995 – 14 May 1996
- Chief Minister: Hiteswar Saikia
- Departments: Tribal Affairs/Welfare of Plains Tribals & Tribal Area & Backward Classes; Flood Control; Irrigation; Forests; Transport
- In office 24 December 1985 – 28 November 1990
- Chief Minister: Prafulla Kumar Mahanta
- Departments: Tribal Affairs/Welfare of Plains Tribals & Tribal Area & Backward Classes; Flood Control; Irrigation; Forests; Transport

Member, Assam Legislative Assembly
- In office 2 May 2021 – 4 May 2026
- Preceded by: Mamun Imdadul Haque Chawdhury
- Succeeded by: Joy Prakash Das
- Constituency: Naoboicha
- In office 19 December 1985 – 13 May 2011
- Preceded by: Ragunath Pamegam
- Succeeded by: Naba Kumar Doley
- Constituency: Dhakuakhana

Personal details
- Born: 1960 (age 65–66) Lakhimpur, Assam, India
- Party: Indian National Congress (1995–present)
- Other political affiliations: Asom Gana Parishad (1985–1995)
- Spouse: Ranee Narah (m. 1986)
- Children: 2 sons
- Education: Cotton College; Gauhati University

Bharat Chandra Narah (born 1960) is an Indian politician from Assam. He was elected to six terms as a MLA in the Assam Legislative Assembly, including five terms as the MLA of Dhakuakhana constituency from 1985 to 2011 and one term as the MLA of Naoboicha constituency from 2021 to 2026. He was a senior cabinet minister in the Assam Government under the Asom Gana Parishad from 1985 to 1990, and again under the Indian National Congress from 1995 to 1996 and from 2001 to 2011. He held the rank of a cabinet minister as the Press Advisor from 2012 to 2016, and was also the government's senior spokesperson. He is a member of the Indian National Congress, and formerly was a member of the Asom Gana Parishad from 1985 to 1995.

== Early life ==
Bharat Chandra Narah was born in 1960 in Dorge, Lakhimpur, Assam, into an Mishing family, to Tileswar Chayengia Narah and Umeswari Narah. As a child, he studied at Dorge Primary School. In 1976, he attained his High School Leaving Certificate after studying at Lakhimpur Academy. He then attended North Lakhimpur College from 1976 to 1978 for pre-university classes before going on to Cotton College, Guwahati. He was twice elected General Secretary of the Cotton College Union Society and graduated in 1981 with a B.A. degree. Narah subsequently attended Gauhati University, where he attained first-class in M.A. Political Science in 1984.

== Assam Movement ==
Narah was one of the main leaders of the Assam Movement from 1979 to 1985, along with Prafulla Kumar Mahanta and Brighu Kumar Phukan. He was initially the All Assam Students' Union (AASU) Assistant General Secretary under AASU's General Secretary, Brighu Kumar Phukan, and AASU's president, Prafulla Kumar Mahanta. In 1980, Narah was part of a delegation that met the Prime Minister of India, Indira Gandhi, to discuss the movement. However, the government was unable or unwilling to meet their demands, leading to six years of popular agitation by civic groups demanding identification, disenfranchisement and deportation of unauthorised immigrants. When Phukan was arrested in 1980, Narah become General Secretary. However, both Narah and Mahanta were themselves subsequently detained by government forces. Narah was detained on 5 January 1982, following which he was imprisoned under the National Security Act. The Assam Movement concluded in 1985 with the Assam Accord, an agreement between the agitation leaders and the Government of India headed by Prime Minister Rajiv Gandhi to resolve the question of large scale migration from Bangladesh.

== Political career ==
After the Assam Accord, Prime Minister Rajiv Gandhi dismissed the-then ruling Indian National Congress government in Assam headed by Chief Minister, Hiteswar Saikia, and immediately called for new elections. Narah won from Dhakuakhana in the 1985 legislative assembly elections as an independent affiliated with the All Assam Students' Union. He was a founding member of the Asom Gana Parishad that formed the government. He was a senior cabinet minister from 1985 to 1990 under Assam Chief Minister, Prafulla Kumar Mahanta. He held the portfolios of Tribal Affairs/Welfare of Plains Tribals & Tribal Area & Backward Classes, Flood Control, Irrigation, Forests, and Transport during this period.

When Bhrigu Kumar Phukan formed the Natun Asom Gana Parishad in 1991, Narah opted out of the primary membership of the Asom Gana Parishad. He won a second term from Dhakuakhana in the 1991 elections, but the Indian National Congress formed the government. He served as the Asom Gana Parishad's chief whip from 1991 to 1995. In 1995, Narah resigned from the Asom Gana Parishad after ideological disagreements with the party leadership. He joined the Indian National Congress and became a senior cabinet minister under Assam Chief Minister, Hiteswar Saikia, helping establish the Mising Autonomous Council for his indigenous tribal community. Narah won a third consecutive term from Dhakuakhana in the 1996 elections. However, the Asom Gana Parishad formed the government.

Narah won a fourth consecutive term from Dhakuakhana in 2001. The Indian National Congress won the elections, and Narah became a senior cabinet minister under Assam Chief Minister, Tarun Gogoi. He held several portfolios, including Tribal Affairs/Welfare of Plain Tribes & Backward Classes, Public Works Department, Flood Control/Fisheries/Water Resources, Co-operation and Parliamentary Affairs. While Tribal Affairs Minister in 2002, he announced the peace agreement with the Bodo Liberation Tigers Force and the approval of the Bodoland Territorial Council. This was followed by the establishment of the Sonowal Kachari, Thengal Kachari, and Deori autonomous district councils in 2005. He won a fifth consecutive term from Dhakuakhana in the 2006 elections, which returned the Indian National Congress to power.

After the entry of the Bodoland People's Front into a coalition government with the Indian National Congress in 2006, Narah gave up the portfolios of Tribal Affairs/Welfare of Plain Tribes & Backward Classes and Public Works Department. He was allocated State Co-operatives to help modernise the economy. In 2008, Narah was shifted from Water Resources to the portfolios of Cultural Affairs and Sports & Youth Welfare to prepare Guwahati, Assam, for the National Games of India in 2011.

After five-consecutive electoral victories in Dhakuakhana from 1985 to 2006, Narah was defeated in his bid for a sixth-term during the 2011 elections in an upset to Asom Gana Parishad candidate, Naba Kumar Doley. The Congress returned to power for a third consecutive term. In 2012, the Chief Minister, Tarun Gogoi, brought Narah back into the government as Press Advisor, with the rank of a cabinet minister. Narah remained the senior government spokesperson as the Press Advisor until the 2016 elections, in which he was unsuccessful in regaining Dhakuakhana and the Indian National Congress lost power to the National Democratic Alliance led by the Bharatiya Janata Party.

In 2021, the Indian National Congress allocated the Dhakuakhana seat to a candidate affiliated with the Mising autonomist organisation, Takam Mising Porin Kebang. Although Narah was elected to his sixth term in the Assam Legislative Assembly from neighbouring Naoboicha, the Indian National Congress was unsuccessful in regaining power. In 2024, Narah opted out of the primary membership of the Indian National Congress, but his resignation was not accepted, and he was appointed to the executive committee of the Assam Pradesh Congress Committee on 2 September 2025.

== Personal life ==
Since 1986, Narah has been married to Ranee Narah, who was Minister of State for Tribal Affairs from 2012 to 2014 in the Union Government of India, and was elected to four-terms as a Member of Parliament from 1998 to 2004, 2009 to 2014, and 2016 to 2022.
