= Lakhimpur Lok Sabha constituency =

Lok Sabha constituency in Assam

Coordinates: 26.5°N 91.9°E

Lakhimpur AS-12
- Lok Sabha constituency
- Interactive Map Outlining Lakhimpur Lok Sabha constituency

Constituency details
- Country: India
- Region: Northeast India
- State: Assam
- Established: 1967
- Reservation: None

Member of Parliament
- 18th Lok Sabha
- Incumbent Pradan Baruah
- Party: BJP
- Alliance: NDA
- Elected year: 2024

Lakhimpur Lok Sabha constituency is one of the 14 Lok Sabha constituencies in Assam state in north-eastern India.

== Assembly segments ==
Lakhimpur Lok Sabha constituency is composed of the following assembly segments:

=== Current assembly segments ===
No.	Name	Reserved for (SC/ST/None)	District	Member	Party	2024 Lead
74	Rongonadi	None	Lakhimpur	Rishiraj Hazarika	BJP	BJP
75	Nawboicha	SC	Lakhimpur	Joy Prakash Das	INC	INC
76	Lakhimpur	None	Lakhimpur	Manab Deka	BJP	BJP
77	Dhakuakhana	ST	Lakhimpur	Naba Kumar Doley	BJP	BJP
78	Dhemaji	ST	Dhemaji	Ranoj Pegu	BJP	BJP
79	Sissiborgaon	None	Dhemaji	Jiban Gogoi	BJP	BJP
80	Jonai	ST	Dhemaji	Bhubon Pegu	BJP	BJP
81	Sadiya	None	Tinsukia	Bolin Chetia	BJP	BJP
82	Doom Dooma	None	Tinsukia	Rupesh Gowala	BJP	BJP

=== Previous assembly segments ===
Constituency number	Name	Reserved for (SC/ST/None)	District
99	Majuli	ST	Majuli
110	Naoboicha	None	Lakhimpur
111	Lakhimpur	None	Lakhimpur
112	Dhakuakhana	ST	Lakhimpur
113	Dhemaji	ST	Dhemaji
114	Jonai	ST	Dhemaji
121	Chabua	None	Dibrugarh
125	Doom Dooma	None	Tinsukia
126	Sadiya	None	Tinsukia

== Members of Parliament ==
Year	Winner	Party
Sibsagar North Lakhimpur Lok Sabha Constituency
1951–52	Surendranath Buragohain	Indian National Congress
1952^	Bimala Prasad Chaliha	Indian National Congress
Sibsagar Lok Sabha Constituency
1957	Prafulla Chandra Borooah	Indian National Congress
1962	Prafulla Chandra Borooah	Indian National Congress
Lakhimpur Lok Sabha Constituency
1967	Biswanarayan Shastri	Indian National Congress
1971	Biswanarayan Shastri	Indian National Congress
1977	Lalit Kumar Doley	Indian National Congress
1985	Gakul Saikia	Independent
1991	Balin Kuli	Indian National Congress
1996	Arun Kumar Sarmah	Asom Gana Parishad
1998	Ranee Narah	Indian National Congress
1999	Ranee Narah	Indian National Congress
2004	Arun Kumar Sarmah	Asom Gana Parishad
2009	Ranee Narah	Indian National Congress
2014	Sarbananda Sonowal	Bharatiya Janata Party
2016^	Pradan Baruah	Bharatiya Janata Party
2019	Pradan Baruah	Bharatiya Janata Party
2024	Pradan Baruah	Bharatiya Janata Party

^ by poll

== Election results ==
=== General election 2024 ===
2024 Indian general elections: Lakhimpur
Party	Candidate	Votes	%	±%
BJP	Pradan Baruah	6,63,122	54.75	
INC	Uday Shankar Hazarika	4,61,865	38.13	
CPI	Dhiren Kachari	19,631	1.62	
AITC	Ghana Kanta Chutia	14,197	1.17	
Independent	Bikram Ramchiary	10,293	0.8	
Independent	Gobin Biswakarma	7,526	0.6	
Independent	Deba Nath Pait	6,163	0.5	
SUCI(C)	Pallab Pegu	6,137	0.5	
Voters Party International	Biren Bailung	5,359	0.5	
NOTA	None of the above	16,921	1.4	
Majority		2,01,257	16.62	−10.69
Turnout		12,11,214	76.8	+1.49
Registered electors		15,77,234		
BJP hold		Swing		

=== General election 2019 ===
2019 Indian general elections: Lakhimpur
Party	Candidate	Votes	%	±%
BJP	Pradan Baruah	7,76,406	60.49	
INC	Anil Borgohain	4,25,855	33.18	
CPI	Arup Kalita	13,378	1.04	
CPI(M)	Amiya Kumar Handique	12,809	1.00	
Asom Jana Morcha	Ubaidur Rahman	8,738	0.7	
Voters Party International	Bhupen Narah	5,581	0.4	
Independent	Probhu Lal Vaisnava	4,866	0.4	
NCP	Anup Pratim Borbaruah	4,527	0.4	
SUCI(C)	Hem Kanta Miri	4,034	0.3	
Independent	Ambaz Uddin	3,890	0.3	
NOTA	None of the Above	15,220	1.19	
Majority		3,50,551	27.31	+8.39
Turnout		12,83,589	75.31	+8.91
Registered electors		16,21,466		
BJP hold		Swing		

=== 2016 by-election ===
A by-election was necessitated following the election of Sarbananda Sonowal as Chief Minister of Assam.

Bye-election, 2016: Lakhimpur
Party	Candidate	Votes	%	±%
BJP	Pradan Baruah	5,51,663	54.87	−0.18
INC	Hema Hari Prasanna Pegu	3,61,444	35.95	+7.15
Independent	Dilip Moran	42,667	4.24	N/A
CPI(M)	Amiya Kumar Handique	20,613	2.05	N/A
SUCI(C)	Hem Kanta Miri	12,402	1.23	N/A
NOTA	None of the Above	16,438	1.63	+0.62
Majority		1,90,219	18.92	−7.33
Turnout		10,05,227	66.44	−11.26
Registered electors		15,12,950		
BJP hold		Swing		

=== General election 2014 ===
2014 Indian general elections: Lakhimpur
Party	Candidate	Votes	%	±%
BJP	Sarbananda Sonowal	6,12,543	55.05	+55.05
INC	Ranee Narah	3,20,405	28.80	−9.93
AGP	Hari Prasad Dihingia	81,753	7.35	−26.48
AIUDF	Mamun Imdadul Haque Chawdhury	37,343	3.36	+3.36
AITC	Dhebor Gohain Boruah	9,095	0.82	+0.82
SUCI(C)	Hem Kanta Miri	6,896	0.62	+0.62
Independent	Ranjit Singh Gorh	6,335	0.57	+0.57
Independent	Hrishikesh Baruah	6,013	0.54	+0.54
Independent	David Horo	5,903	0.53	+0.53
CPI(ML)L	Tanish Orang	4,721	0.42	−0.29
Independent	Khairul Islam	4,119	0.37	+0.37
AAP	Dr. Hiramoni Deka Sonowal	2,893	0.26	+0.26
Independent	Keshab Gogoi	2,752	0.25	+0.25
NOTA	None of the Above	11,204	1.01	−−−
Majority		2,92,138	26.25	+21.35
Turnout		11,12,670	77.75	+9.49
Registered electors		14,30,994		
BJP gain from INC		Swing		

=== General election 2009 ===
2009 Indian general elections: Lakhimpur
Party	Candidate	Votes	%	±%
INC	Ranee Narah	3,52,330	38.73	
AGP	Arun Kumar Sarmah	3,07,758	33.83	
Independent	Ranoj Pegu	1,47,586	16.22	
CPI	Bhogeswar Dutta	26,086	2.87	
Independent	Rabin Deka	19,050	2.1	
Independent	Asap Sundiguria	12,067	1.3	
Independent	Bhumidhar Hazarika	7,367	0.8	
SS	Gangadhar Dutta	7,228	0.8	
CPI(ML)L	Debnath Majhi	6,432	0.7	
Rashtriya Dehat Morcha Party	Lalit Mili	4,508	0.5	
Independent	Prashanta Gogoi	4,263	0.5	
AIFB	Ratneswar Gogoi	4,048	0.4	
LJP	Sonamoni Das	4,047	0.4	
RWS	Pran Jyoti Borpatra Gohain	3,479	0.4	
SP	Minu Buragohain	3,372	0.4	
Majority		44,572	4.90	
Turnout		9,10,710	68.35	
Registered electors		13,32,518		
INC gain from AGP		Swing		

=== General election 2004 ===
2004 Indian general elections: Lakhimpur
Party	Candidate	Votes	%	±%
AGP	Arun Kumar Sarmah	3,00,865	37.6	
INC	Ranee Narah	2,72,717	34.1	
BJP	Uday Shankar Hazarika	1,69,123	21.1	
Independent	Hekjel Wood	19,710	2.5	
RSP	Puspa Gogoi	11,757	1.5	
SAP	Padmeshwar Phukan	7,888	1.0	
Independent	Rabin Deka	4,905	0.6	
Independent	Biju Narah	4,456	0.6	
LJP	Sunmoni Das	2,948	0.4	
Independent	Ghanashyam Bhattarai	2,886	0.4	
Independent	Isak Korkoria	2,765	0.3	
Majority		28,148	3.5	
Turnout		8,00,101	71	
Registered electors		11,26,632		
AGP gain from INC		Swing		

=== General election 1999 ===
1999 Indian general election: Lakhimpur
Party	Candidate	Votes	%	±%
INC	Ranee Narah	2,55,925	34.41	
AGP	Sarbananda Sonowal	2,01,402	27.08	
BJP	Uday Shankar Hazarika	1,84,533	24.81	
Independent	Ranoj Pegu	89,963	12.09	
NCP	Balin Kuli	5,527	0.74	
Independent	Isak Karkoria	2,030	0.3	
JD(S)	Rafiqul Latif Baruah	1,287	0.2	
SP	Minu Buragohain	1,233	0.2	
Ajeya Bharat Party	Chinu Saikia	1,222	0.2	
Independent	Sidananda Kaman	701	0.1	
Majority		54,523	7.33	
Turnout		7,67,004	72.3	
Registered electors		10,60,744		
INC hold		Swing		

=== General election 1998 ===
1998 Indian general election: Lakhimpur
Party	Candidate	Votes	%	±%
INC	Ranee Narah	2,68,794	40.05	
AGP	Arun Kumar Sarmah	1,48,012	22.05	
BJP	Uday Shankar Hazarika	1,30,298	19.41	
Independent	Ranoj Pegu	1,02,046	15.20	
Independent	Tarun Moran	12,492	1.8	
Independent	Dilip Hazarika	4,842	0.7	
Independent	Premadhar Bora	3,870	0.5	
Independent	Lakhi Nath Panging	855	0.1	
Majority		1,20,782	18	
Turnout		7,05,158	66.7	
Registered electors		10,57,801		
INC gain from AGP		Swing		

=== General election 1996 ===
1996 Indian general election: Lakhimpur
Party	Candidate	Votes	%	±%
AGP	Arun Kumar Sarmah	2,21,183	33.06	
INC	Balin Kuli	2,17,743	32.54	
Independent	Ranoj Pegu	93,117	13.92	
BJP	Chuchen Konwar	56,898	8.50	
AIIC(T)	Narendra Nath Gohain	25,246	3.77	
Independent	Md. Ambazuddin	17,180	2.4	
Independent	Chandra Kishore Tiwari	14,537	2.1	
Independent	Goluk Kakati	13,038	1.8	
Independent	Sacchidananda Medhi	2,921	0.4	
Independent	Jogamoni Chutia	2,876	0.4	
Independent	Padmeswar Phukan	2,733	0.4	
Independent	Hiranya Kr. Pegu	1,648	0.2	
Majority		3,440	0.52	
Turnout		7,07,589	76.8	
Registered electors		9,21,444		
AGP gain from INC		Swing		

=== General election 1991 ===
1991 Indian general election: Lakhimpur
Party	Candidate	Votes	%	±%
INC	Balin Kuli	1,87,610	29.2	
AGP	Iswar Prasanna Hazarika	1,26,250	19.6	
Independent	Ranoj Pegu	89,524	13.9	
JD	Dulal Baruah	66,983	10.4	
CPI	Saifuddin Ali Hazarika	32,296	5.4	
Independent	Neelotpal Rajkonwar	21,550	3.4	
PTC	Birochon Doley	16,360	2.5	
Independent	Norendra Nath Gohain	12,719	2.0	
NAGP	Girish Chandra Patra	11,245	1.8	
Independent	Rita Debi (W)	10,399	1.6	
Jharkhand Party	Padameswar Phukan	6,211	1.0	
Independent	Hiranya Pegu	5,486	0.9	
Independent	Uma Kanta Rajkhowa	4,371	0.7	
Independent	Premadhar Borah	4,070	0.6	
Independent	Radakishan Baheti	3,144	0.5	
Majority		61,360	9.6	
Turnout		6,42,536	72.4	
Registered electors		8,87,318		
INC gain from AGP		Swing		

=== General election 1985 ===
1985 Indian general election: Lakhimpur
Party	Candidate	Votes	%	±%
Independent	Gakul Saikia	2,51,730	47.3	
CPI	Nameswar Pegu	81,796	15.4	
Independent	Tosodurga Husain	50,109	9.4	
Independent	Malaya Kumar Pegu	42,142	7.9	
JP	Mukta Bharali	20,513	3.9	
LKD	Pradip Chutia	17,339	3.3	
Independent	Kumar Chandra Patirigam	14,125	2.7	
Independent	Baswanarayan Shastri	10,261	1.9	
Independent	Shankar Sharma	9,299	1.7	
Independent	Rajani Kumar Datta	3,932	0.7	
Majority		1,69,934	31.9	
Turnout		5,31,880	73.1	
Registered electors		7,27,183		
Independent gain from INC		Swing		

=== General election 1977 ===
1977 Indian general election: Lakhimpur
Party	Candidate	Votes	%	±%
INC	Lalit Kumar Doley	162,750	56.5	
BLD	Mohananda Bora	97,518	33.9	
Independent	Abhiram Sanga	12,627	4.4	
Independent	Lucy Gogoi	2,680	0.9	
Majority		65,232	22.7	
Turnout		2,87,875	51.8	
Registered electors		5,55,812		
INC hold		Swing		

=== General election 1971 ===
1971 Indian general election: Lakhimpur
Party	Candidate	Votes	%	±%
INC	Biswanarayan Shastri	89,070	40.5	
Independent	Khagendra Nath Saikia	45,358	20.6	
Independent	Birason Doley	28,023	12.7	
CPI	Bhogeswar Dutta	24,611	11.2	
Independent	P. M. Sarwan	14,458	6.6	
SWA	Padma Bikash Borgohain	7,033	3.2	
Majority		43,712	19.9	
Turnout		2,20,051	49.5	
Registered electors		4,44,779		
INC hold		Swing		

=== General election 1967 ===
1967 Indian general election: Lakhimpur
Party	Candidate	Votes	%	±%
INC	Biswanarayan Shastri	102,739	48.1	
CPI	S. Goswami	49,053	23.0	
SWA	P. B. Bargohain	28,711	13.5	
Independent	M. N. Borpatra	21,519	10.1	
Majority		53,686	25.2	
Turnout		2,13,392	53.7	
Registered electors		3,97,099		
INC gain from		Swing		

== See also ==
- Lakhimpur district
- List of constituencies of the Lok Sabha
