= Dileswar Tanti =

Indian politician

Minister for Labour
- In office 30 June 1991 – 22 April 1996
- Chief Minister: Hiteswar Saikia

Member of Assam Legislative Assembly
- In office 21 March 1978 - 19 May 2006
- Preceded by: Molia Tanti
- Succeeded by: Durga Bhumji
- Constituency: Doom Dooma

Personal details
- Born: 2 February 1944
- Died: 3 August 2022 (aged 78) Gauhati Medical College and Hospital, Assam, India
- Party: Indian National Congress (1978-2006)
- Other political affiliations: Nationalist Congress Party (2006)
- Spouse: Kamala Sawachi (m. 1971, died)
- Children: 3
- Parent(s): Tilak Tanti (father); Sonamoni Tanti (mother)
- Education: Gauhati University

Dileswar Tanti (2 February 1944 – 3 August 2022) was an Indian politician from the state of Assam. He was elected to the Doom Dooma constituency 6 times and was a labour minister in the Hiteswar Saikia cabinet.

== Early life and education ==
Tanti was born to Tilak Tani and Someswari Tanti on 2 February 1944. He had his early education in Diboi. After he received his MA in Economics at Gauhati University, he served as a lecturer at Sonari college from 1970 to 1971. He then served as Assistant Secretary of Assam Chah Mazdoor Sangha (ACMS), Doom Dooma Branch from 1971 to 1978.

== Political career ==
Tanti was the Indian National Congress candidate for Doom Dooma in the 1978 Assam Legislative Assembly election. He received 13023 votes, 39.2% of the total vote and defeated his nearest opponent by 4209 votes.

He sought reelection in the 1983 Assam Legislative Assembly election. He received 8531 votes, 72.19% of the total vote and was reelected.

He was again the Indian National Congress candidate for Doom Dooma in the 1985 Assam Legislative Assembly election. He received 22755 votes, 51.24% of the total vote and he defeated his nearest opponent by 11797 votes.

He was again the Indian National Congress candidate In the 1991 Assam Legislative Assembly election. He received 36679 votes, 68.95% of the total vote and he defeated his nearest opponent by 29687 votes. He was made labour minister in the Hiteswar Saikia cabinet.

He was again the Indian National Congress candidate for Doom Dooma in 1996. He received 40505 votes, 67.17% of the total vote, defeating his nearest opponent by 29960 votes.

Tanti was again the Congress candidate for Doom Dooma in 2001. He received 52846 votes, 77.93% of the total vote. He defeated his nearest opponent by 37878 votes.

Tanti did not receive the congress nomination in the 2006 Assam Legislative Assembly election and instead was the Nationalist Congress Party candidate. He received 17299 votes, coming third to Congress candidate Durga Bhumij, after serving as MLA for 28 years.

== Personal life and death ==
Tanti married Kamala Tanti (née) in 1971 and they had 3 children. His wife predeceased him.

Tanti published 3 books during his lifetime.

On 13 July 2022, Tanti was admitted to the Gauhati Medical College and Hospital after being seriously ill for the days prior due a blood haemorrhage. On 3 August 2022, Tanti died at the Gauhati Medical College and Hospital at the age of 78. He was survived by two daughters and a son. Several politicians paid tribute to him, including MLA Rupesh Gowala and former Union Minister Paban Singh Ghatowar.
