= Biswanarayan Shastri =

Indian politician

Member of Parliament, Lok Sabha
- In office 1967–1977
- Succeeded by: Lalit Kumar Doley
- Constituency: Lakhimpur

Personal details
- Born: 11 August 1918 Narayanpur, North Lakhimpur, Assam, British India
- Died: 9 July 2002 (aged 83)
- Party: Indian National Congress
- Spouse: Mira Devi

Biswanarayan Shastri (1918–2002) was Indian politician who was an Indologist, Sanskrit scholar, author, educationist and a public servant. He was elected from Lakhimpur, Assam to the Lok Sabha, the lower house of the Parliament of India as a member of the Indian National Congress.

== Early life and education ==
Shastri was born on 11 August 1918, to Rupada Devi and Benikanta Goswami, in a Vainavaite Satra in the Narayanpur area of the present Lakhimpur district of Assam, a place very closely associated with the Kala-Samiti faith of New Vaisnavism. He lost his mother, Rupada Devi, at the age of four and was brought up by his paternal grandmother, whom he considered as his mother.

His father, Benikanta Goswami, was a Sanskrit scholar of high repute and the head of a Vaishnava monastery. Thus, from an early age, Shastri was exposed to the study of Sanskrit. His father taught him Amarakosha in the traditional oral method and Biswanarayan memorised major parts of the work without a book. This formed the foundation for his future study in different branches of Sanskrit literature. He studied Sanskrit literature, grammar, and Indian philosophy at traditional Sanskrit schools or pathshalas in Bihpuria, Nalbari, Kolkata, and Varanasi.

He passed the Aadya examination of Vyakarana of the Assam Sanskrit Board as valedictorian, which resulted in securing a scholarship.

He continued studying at the Barada Vidyalaya of Bihpuria with the aid of the scholarships and then migrated to the newly established Sanskrit College at Nalbari. From Nalbari Sanskrit College, he passed the title examination, securing the first rank in the Board exams, earning him cash prizes and medals for his achievement. He proceeded to Kolkata and Varanasi and acquired further knowledge in Indian Philosophy. Through the years of study, he obtained the titles of Sahitya Shastri, Vyakarana Shastri, Mimamsa Shastri, Kavyatirtha, and Darsanacharya.

== Positions held ==
- Principal of North Lakhimpur College
- Special Officer to the Government of Assam
- Secretary, Publication Board, Assam
- General Secretary, North Lakhimpur District Congress Committee, 1955–58
- Chairman, School Board; North Lakhimpur, 1956–58;
- Member of A.P.C.C, 1956–58,
- Member of Executive Board Sahitya Akademy, 1967,
- Member of Central Advisory Board of Education, 1967–70,
- Member of Kendriya Sanskrit Parishad, 1970,
- Member of Rastriya Sanskrit Sansthan, 1970,
- Member of Trade Advisory Council, 1969,
- Member of Central Silk Board, 1967–69,
- Member of Advisory Council Community Development and Panchayati Raj, 1968–70, and
- Member of Assamese Glossary Committee, Government of Assam, 1967;
- President, Assam Research Society, Guwahati,
- Editor, Assam Sahitya Sabha Patrika 1963–65;
- Treasurer, Sangeet Akademy, Assam;
- Member of Fourth & Fifth Lok Sabha, 1967–70, 1971–1976
- Member of Privileges Committee, 1968–69,
- Member of Consultative Committee on Defence
