= Talap Town =

Town in India

Talap Town Talap
- Village
- Talap Town
- Map of Assam Talap Town (India)
- Coordinates: 27.6856°N 95.5735°E
- Country: India
- State: Assam
- District: Tinsukia
- Subdivision: Doom Dooma

Area
  - Total: 28.95 ha (71.5 acres)
- Elevation: 128 m (420 ft)

Population (2011)
  - Total: 2,674
  - Density: 9,237/km^{2} (23,920/sq mi)

Languages
  - Official: Assamese
- Time zone: UTC+5:30 (IST)
- Postal code: 786156
- Census code: 290175

Talap is a town in Tinsukia district, Assam, India.

As of the 2011 Census of India, Talap has a total population of 2,674 people including 1,393 males and 1,281 females. The literacy rate of the Talap per the census is 80.4%.
