= Balin Kuli =

Indian politician

Member of Parliament, Lok Sabha
- In office 1991–1996
- Preceded by: Gakul Saikia
- Succeeded by: Arun Kumar Sarmah
- Constituency: Lakhimpur

Personal details
- Born: September 1947 (age 78) Dahgharia Badati,Lakhimpur district, Assam
- Party: Indian National Congress
- Spouse: Bharati Kuli

Balin Kuli is an Indian politician. He was elected to the Lok Sabha, the lower house of the Parliament of India, as a member of the Indian National Congress.
