= Doom Dooma Assembly constituency =

Constituency of the Assam legislative assembly in India

Doom Dooma
- Constituency No. 82 for the Assam Legislative Assembly

Constituency details
- Country: India
- Region: Northeast India
- State: Assam
- District: Tinsukia
- Lok Sabha constituency: Lakhimpur
- Established: 1951
- Reservation: None

Member of Legislative Assembly
- 16th Assam Legislative Assembly
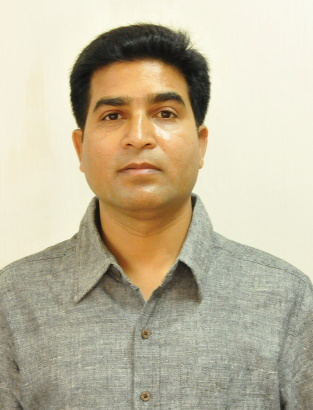
- Incumbent Rupesh Gowala
- Party: BJP
- Alliance: NDA
- Elected year: 2026

Doom Dooma Assembly constituency is one of the 126 assembly constituencies of Assam a north east state of India. Doom Dooma is also part of Lakhimpur Lok Sabha constituency.

== Details ==
Following are details on Doom Dooma (Vidhan Sabha constituency):

- Country: India.
- State: Assam.
- District: Tinsukia district.
- Lok Sabha Constituency: Lakhimpur Lok Sabha constituency.
- Area Includes: Doom Dooma M.B., Hapjan Dev. Block(Part), Kakopather Dev. Block(Part).

== Members of Legislative Assembly ==
Election	Member	Party affiliation
1952	Harihar Chowdhury	Indian National Congress
1957	Molia Tati	Indian National Congress
1962	Molia Tati	Indian National Congress
1967	Molia Tati	Indian National Congress
1972	Molia Tati	Indian National Congress
1978	Dileswar Tanti	Indian National Congress
1983	Dileswar Tanti	Indian National Congress
1985	Dileswar Tanti	Indian National Congress
1991	Dileswar Tanti	Indian National Congress
1996	Dileswar Tanti	Indian National Congress
2001	Dileswar Tanti	Indian National Congress
2006	Durga Bhumij	Indian National Congress
2011	Dilip Moran	Bharatiya Janata Party
2016	Durga Bhumij	Indian National Congress
2021	Rupesh Gowala	Bharatiya Janata Party
2026	Rupesh Gowala	Bharatiya Janata Party

== Election Results ==
=== 2026 ===
2026 Assam Legislative Assembly election: Doom Dooma
Party	Candidate	Votes	%	±%
NDA	Rupesh Gowala	86009	70.79	
INC	Durga Bhumij	30627	25.21	
NOTA	NOTA	4864	4	
Margin of victory		55382	45.58	
Turnout		121500	81.43	
BJP gain from INC		Swing		

=== 2016 ===
2016 Assam Legislative Assembly election: Doom Dooma
Party	Candidate	Votes	%	±%
INC	Durga Bhumij	46,938	45.39	+13.82
BJP	Dilip Moran	46,156	44.64	+7.64
Independent	Hrishikesh Baruah	1,481	1.43	N/A
JCP	Monoj Sawashi	1,443	1.39	N/A
Independent	Rajesh Karmakar	1,441	1.39	N/A
Independent	Sarfaraz Alam	846	0.81	N/A
Independent	Isab Hussain	642	0.62	N/A
Independent	Ranjit Gorh	571	0.55	N/A
Independent	Bhabakanta Chutia	557	0.53	−4.22
NOTA	None of the above	3,317	3.20	N/A
Majority		782	0.75	−4.68
Turnout		1,03,392	83.58	+12.31
Registered electors		1,23,696		
INC gain from BJP		Swing		

=== 2011 ===
2011 Assam Legislative Assembly election: Doom Dooma
Party	Candidate	Votes	%	±%
BJP	Dilip Moran	31,709	37.00	+11.94
INC	Rupesh Gowala	27,053	31.57	+4.26
Independent	Durga Bhumij	16,971	19.80	N/A
Independent	Bhabakanta Chutia	4,072	4.75	N/A
AGP	Manoj Manki	2,944	3.44	−10.87
JMM	Bhagawan Tanti	1,510	1.76	N/A
AIUDF	Bharat Yadav	1,432	1.67	+0.42
Majority		4,656	5.43	+3.18
Turnout		85,691	71.27	−0.21
Registered electors		1,20,233		
BJP gain from INC		Swing		

=== 2006 ===
Assam Legislative Assembly election, 2006: Doom Dooma
Party	Candidate	Votes	%	±%
INC	Durga Bhumij	24,255	27.31	
BJP	Dilip Moran	22,259	25.06	
NCP	Dileswar Tanti	17,299	19.48	
AGP	Naren Hazarika	12,709	14.31	
Independent	Ranjoy Tanti	5,119	5.76	
Independent	Juga Arandhara	3,466	3.90	
Independent	Deva Barman	1,611	1.81	
AIUDF	Bulbul Gowala	1,110	1.25	
AGP(P)	Ratna Bordoloi	995	1.12	
Majority		1,996	2.25	
Turnout		88,823	71.48	
Registered electors		1,24,267		
INC hold		Swing		

== See also ==
- Doom Dooma
- Tinsukia district
- List of constituencies of Assam Legislative Assembly
