= Gakul Saikia =

Indian politician

Member of Parliament, Lok Sabha
- In office 1985–1989
- Preceded by: Lalit Kumar Doley
- Succeeded by: Balin Kuli
- Constituency: Lakhimpur

Personal details
- Party: Asom Gana Parishad

Gakul Saikia is an Indian politician. He was elected to the Lok Sabha, the lower house of the Parliament of India, as a member of the Asom Gana Parishad.
