= North Lakhimpur University =

University in Assam, India

- Other names: NLU
- Motto: आऩो भद्रा: क्रतवो यन्तु बिश्वत:
- Motto in English: Let noble thoughts come from all directions ...
- Type: Public
- Established: December 1, 2023; 2 years ago
- Accreditation: NAAC; UGC
- Academic affiliations: UGC
- Chancellor: Governor of Assam
- Vice-Chancellor: Mukul Ch. Bora
- Academic staff: 100
- Administrative staff: 120
- Students: 4200
- Undergraduates: 3000
- Postgraduates: 500
- Other students: 700
- Location: North Lakhimpur, Lakhimpur, Assam, India; 27.2307°N 94.0894°E
- Campus: Urban
- Colours: Blackish blue & white
- Website: www.nlu.ac.in

North Lakhimpur University is a public state university situated in the Lakhimpur District of Assam. Formerly it was the first autonomous college in the state of Assam. The college was upgraded to a state university on 1st Dec 2023 by the Government of Assam.

== History ==
North Lakhimpur University was established on 1 December 2023 through the North Lakhimpur University Act, by upgrading the former North Lakhimpur College (Autonomous).

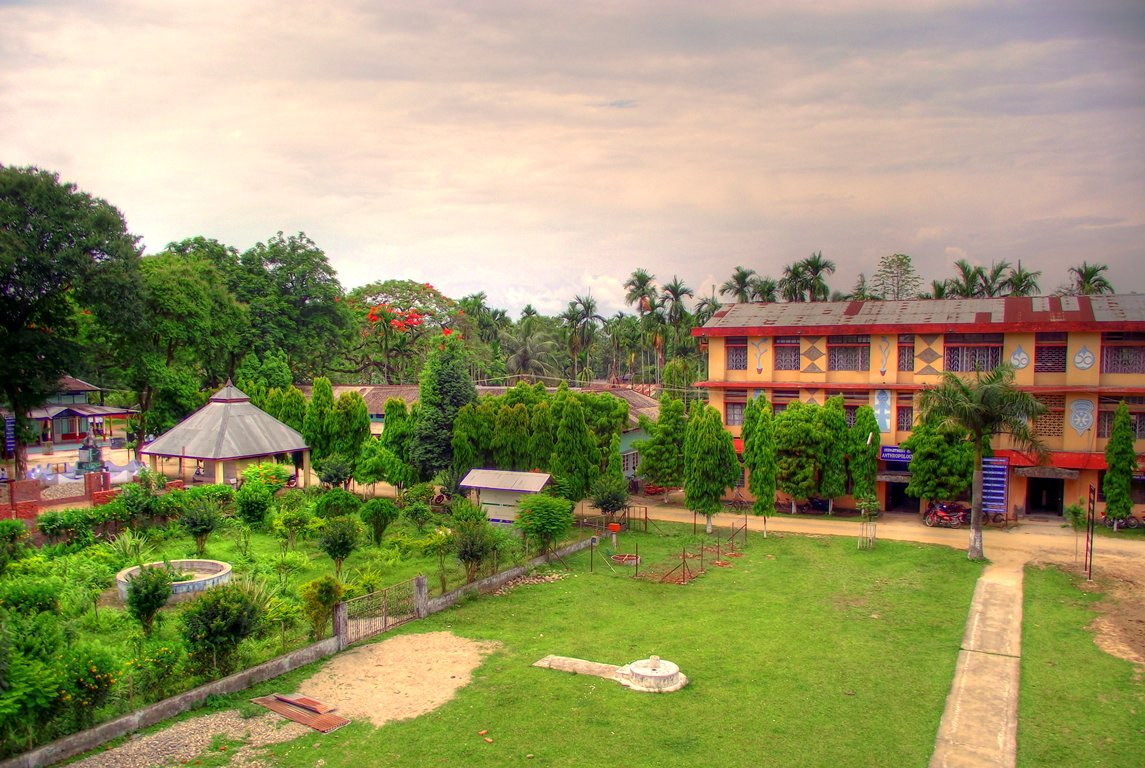
Academic Building of North Lakhimpur College

== Organisation and administration ==
=== Governance ===
Dr. Mukul Ch. Borah has been appointed as the first Vice Chancellor of the newly established university, while Dr. Biman Chandra Chetia, who served as the last Principal of the college before its upgrade, now serves as the first Registrar of the university. The institution is currently undergoing a transition from a former autonomous college to a state university.

=== Departments ===
==== Humanities ====
- Assamese Department
- English Department
- Hindi Department
- Philosophy Department

==== Social Science ====
- Anthropology Department
- Economics Department
- Education Department
- History Department
- Home Science Department
- Political Science Department

==== Natural Science ====
- Botany Department
- Chemistry Department
- Electronics Department
- Geography Department
- Mathematics Department
- Physics Department
- Statistics Department
- Zoology Department

==== Technology ====
- Computer Science Department

==== Physical Education ====
- Physical Education Department

=== Facilities ===
- Central Instrumentation Center
- Central Library
- 24*7 Residential Library
- Indoor Stadium
- Central Computer Center
- Boys Hostels
- Girls Hostel
- Gymnasium
- Playground with modern Synthetic Track

== Academics ==
The university offers undergraduate major (honours) programs, postgraduate courses, various diploma programs, and PhD research opportunities across a broad range of disciplines in both Arts and Science streams. It comprises 19 departments and serves approximately 3,500 undergraduate students, 500 postgraduate students, and around 100 research scholars.

=== Courses ===
The University offeres the following courses

==== Undergraduate Degree Courses ====
- Four Year Bachelor of Science (BSc)
- Four Year Bachelor of Arts (BA)
- Bachelor of Computer Application (BCA)
- Bachelor of Physical Education (BPES)
- Integrated Teachers Education Programme (Integrated BA/BSc-BEd)

==== Post Graduate Degree Courses ====
- Five Year Integrated Masters of Arts (Integrated MA)
- Five Year Integrated Masters of Science (Integrated MSc)
- Masters of Arts (MA)
- Masters of Science (MSc)

==== Research Courses ====
- PhD

==== Other Courses ====
- Post Graduate Diploma in Computer Application (PGDCA)
- Post Graduate Diploma in Disaster Management (PGDDM)
- Post Graduate Diploma in Tourism Management (PGDTM)
- UG Diploma Courses
- Certificate Courses
