= Rishiraj Hazarika =

Indian politician (born 1990)

Rishiraj Hazarika (born 1990) is an Indian politician from Assam. He is a member of the Assam Legislative Assembly from the Rongonadi Assembly constituency in Lakhimpur district representing the Bharatiya Janata Party.

== Early life and education ==
Hazarika is from Rongonadi, Lakhimpur district, Assam. He is the son of the late Surya Kamal Hazarika. He studied Class 12 in arts stream and passed the examinations conducted by the Assam Higher Secondary Education Council in 2011. He runs his own business and he declared assets worth Rs.6 crore in his affidavit to the Election Commission of India.

== Career ==
Hazarika won the Rongonadi Assembly constituency representing the Bharatiya Janata Party in the 2026 Assam Legislative Assembly election. He polled 82,493 votes and defeated his nearest rival, Joyonto Khaund of the Indian National Congress, by a margin of 19,652 votes.
