= Naba Kumar Doley =

Indian politician

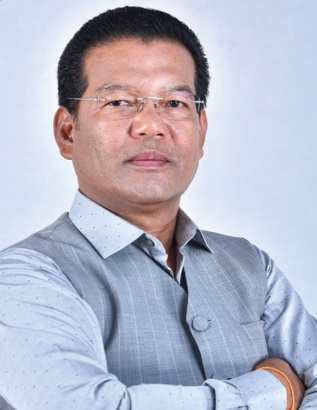
- Official portrait

Minister of State, Assam
- In office 24 May 2016 – 10 May 2021
- Chief Minister: Sarbananda Sonowal
- Departments: Panchayat and Rural Development (Ind. charge); Cultural Affairs (Ind. charge); Sports and Youth Welfare (Ind. charge, until 2018); Social Welfare (until 2018); Environment and Forests (from 2018)
- Preceded by: Rakibul Hussain (P&RD); Bismita Gogoi (Culture); Ajit Singh (Sports)
- Succeeded by: Ranjeet Kumar Dass (P&RD); Bimal Bora (Culture, Sports)

Member, Assam Legislative Assembly
- Incumbent
- Assumed office 13 May 2011
- Preceded by: Bharat Narah
- Constituency: Dhakuakhana

Personal details
- Born: 17 July 1971 (age 55) Dhakuakhana, Lakhimpur district, Assam
- Party: Bharatiya Janata Party (2015–present)
- Other political affiliations: Asom Gana Parishad (until 2015)
- Spouse: Karabi Pegu Doley (m. 2007)
- Children: 1
- Parents: Paramananda Doley (father); Puspalata Doley (mother)

Naba Kumar Doley (born 17 July 1971) is a Bharatiya Janata Party politician from Assam, India. He was elected in Assam Legislative Assembly election in 2011 and 2016 from Dhakuakhana constituency. He became a minister in the Sarbananda Sonowal-led government in 2016. Formerly, he was with Asom Gana Parishad. He is also the president of Assam Football Association.
