= Sanjay Raj Subba =

Indian politician (1959/1960–2025)

Member of the Assam Legislative Assembly for Naoboicha
- In office 2006–2016
- Preceded by: Sultan Sadik
- Succeeded by: Mamun Imdadul Haque Chawdhury

Personal details
- Born: 1959 or 1960
- Died: 17 June 2025 (aged 65) Laluk, Lakhimpur district, Assam, India
- Party: Indian National Congress

Sanjay Raj Subba (1959 or 1960 – 17 June 2025) was an Indian politician in Assam who was elected to the Assam Legislative Assembly in 2006 and 2011 from Naoboicha constituency as a member of the Indian National Congress.

Subba died on 17 June 2025, at the age of 65.
