= Japjup =

Japjup is a small village in Lakhimpur district, Assam, near Bihpuria. It is populated by approximately 60 families. It was founded in 1900 by migrants from Majuli, Jorhat to cultivate crops.

It is said that in ancient times there were two ponds that were joined in an earthquake, hence the name. Thus, now there are two japjups; No-1 and No-2, altogether more or less 250 families. The primary education institutes n the village include Japjup M.V. School and Changali Goan LP School. Most of the people in both villages are engaged in the occupation of agriculture.
