= Drupang =

Drupang is a small village of Lakhimpur district in Assam, India.
