= Sissiborgaon Assembly constituency =

Assembly constituency of Assam

Sissiborgaon
- Constituency No. 79 for the Assam Legislative Assembly

Constituency details
- Country: India
- Region: Northeast India
- State: Assam
- District: Dhemaji
- Lok Sabha constituency: Lakhimpur
- Established: 2023
- Reservation: None

Sissiborgaon Assembly constituency is one of the 126 assembly constituencies of Assam a north east state of India. It was newly formed in 2023.

== Election Results ==
=== 2026 ===
2026 Assam Legislative Assembly election: Sissiborgaon
Party	Candidate	Votes	%	±%
BJP	Jiban Gogoi	75,758	52.07	
RD	Dulal Chandra Barua	35,165	24.17	
Independent	Nandigiri Bhuyan	26,890	18.48	
NOTA	NOTA	1,038	0.71	
Margin of victory		40,593		
Turnout		145,491		
Rejected ballots				
Registered electors		1,81,483		
BJP win (new seat)				

== See also ==
- List of constituencies of Assam Legislative Assembly
