= Sultan Sadik =

Indian politician

Member of Assam Legislative Assembly
- In office 2001–2006
- Preceded by: Moniram Pathori
- Succeeded by: Sanjay Raj Subba
- Constituency: Naoboicha

Personal details
- Party: Independent

Sultan Sadik is an Indian politician who was elected to the Assam Legislative Assembly from Naoboicha constituency in the 2001 Assam Legislative Assembly election as an independent candidate.
