= Rongonadi Assembly constituency =

Assembly constituency of Assam

Rongonadi
- Constituency No. 74 for the Assam Legislative Assembly

Constituency details
- Country: India
- Region: Northeast India
- State: Assam
- District: Lakhimpur
- Lok Sabha constituency: Lakhimpur
- Established: 2023
- Reservation: None

Rongonadi Assembly constituency is one of the 126 assembly constituencies of Assam a north east state of India. It was newly formed in 2023.

== Election Results ==
=== 2026 ===
2026 Assam Legislative Assembly election: Rongonadi
Party	Candidate	Votes	%	±%
BJP	Rishiraj Hazarika	82493	51.29	
INC	Joyonto Khaund	62841	39.07	
JMM	PAWAN SAUTAL	11832	7.36	
NOTA	NOTA	1261	0.78	
Margin of victory		19652		
Turnout		160849		
Rejected ballots				
Registered electors				
gain from		Swing		

== See also ==
- List of constituencies of Assam Legislative Assembly
