= Shakuntala Gamlin =

Indian Administrative Service officer

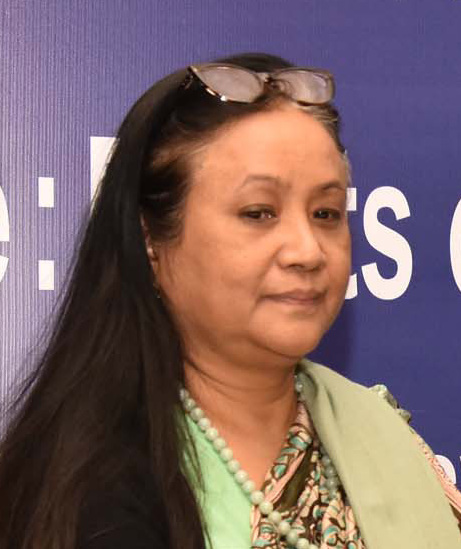

Secretary, Dept.of Empowerment of Person With Disabilities

Personal details
- Born: 23 March 1961 (age 65) Assam, India
- Spouse: Jarbom Gamlin
- Children: 2 Daughters and 1 Son, Bomnee Gamlin
- Parent: Lalit Kumar Doley (father)
- Occupation: Indian Administrative Service Officer

Shakuntala Doley Gamlin is a 1984-batch Arunachal Pradesh-Goa-Mizoram-Union Territories (AGMUT) cadre IAS officer. She served as Secretary, Dept. of Empowerment of Person With Disabilities, Govt. of India. She also served as Chief Secretary of Arunachal Pradesh. She is the first lady IAS from North East to reach a Secretary level post in central ministry. She is the first female IAS officer from Mishing tribe of Assam.

== Early life and education ==
Gamlin was born on 23 March 1961. She hails from Assam and is the youngest of the seven children of former Assam MP, Lalit Kumar Doley. She has done her Bachelor's in History from Lady Shri Ram College, University of Delhi. She did her Post Graduation in Sociology from Delhi School of Economics.

== Career ==
In her career spanning over 30 years, she has worked in several positions in both State and Union governments. Initially she was appointed Director of Tourism in Andaman and Nicobar Islands. Starting from Andaman and Nicobar Islands, Assam, Arunachal Pradesh to the National Capital Territory of Delhi, Gamlin has worked in various capacities. She has also worked on Central deputation with the Ministry of Health & Family Welfare and Ministry of New and Renewable Energy. In 1996 she was appointed the Deputy Commissioner in Municipal Corporation of Delhi, since then she has held positions in various offices at Union and State level positions in Delhi. In January 2015 she was appointed Chairperson of Delhi Transco Limited. She has also been assigned the responsibilities of Principal Secretary (Power) and Principal Secretary (Industries), Government of NCT of Delhi, Chairperson of Indraprastha Power Generation Company Limited & Pragati Power Corporation Limited and CMD of Delhi Power Company Limited. On May 15, 2015 she was appointed the Chief Secretary by Lieutenant Governor Najeeb Jung, which led to confrontation with Aam Aadmi Party led State Government.

In the year 2002, she was a member of the Indian Delegation for the Eighth Session of the Conference of Parties for the United Nations Framework Convention on Climate Change. She has attended the training given by World Bank on Carbon Credit Calculations in clean energy products in USA. She has also been trained in Trade Policy and negotiation in Harvard University. She has been selected as the head of the National Tobacco Control Program and Non-Communicable Disease Program.

== Personal life ==
She is the daughter of former Assam MP, Lalit Kumar Doley, and was the wife of former Arunachal Pradesh Chief Minister, Jarbom Gamlin who was an alumnus of St. Stephen's College, New Delhi. Also the mother of Bomnee Gamlin who studied in 12th grade in Sanskriti School, New Delhi.
