= Latabari =

- village
- Location in Assam, India Latabari (India)
- Coordinates: 26°18′N 89°51′E
- Country: India
- State: Assam
- District: Lakhimpur

Government
  - Body: Gram panchayat

Languages
  - Official: Assamese
- Time zone: UTC+5:30 (IST)
- PIN: 784165
- Vehicle registration: AS
- Nearest city: North Lakhimpur
- Literacy: Approximately 75%%
- Lok Sabha constituency: Tezpur
- Vidhan Sabha constituency: Bihpuria

Latabari is a village with a population of around 800 in the Lakhimpur district of Assam, India.

The village is located in a place very nearby to the river of Brahmaputra. For the up-liftment of the villager's life and overall development of the village many organisations have come up there, which include Latabari Gaon Unnayan Committee (Latabari village development Committee), Latabari Mahila Samiti (Latabari Women Committee), Kamdhenu Shilpi Sangha (Kamdhenu artists' guild), Latabari Mouchumi Moina Parijat (Latabari children's society) etc.
