= Dhakuakhana Assembly constituency =

Constituency of the Assam legislative assembly in India

Dhakuakhana
- Constituency No. 77 for the Assam Legislative Assembly

Constituency details
- Country: India
- Region: Northeast India
- State: Assam
- District: Lakhimpur
- Lok Sabha constituency: Lakhimpur
- Established: 1962
- Reservation: ST

Dhakuakhana Assembly constituency is one of the 126 assembly constituencies of Assam Legislative Assembly. Dhakuakhana forms part of the Lakhimpur Lok Sabha constituency.

== Details ==
Following are details on Dhakuakhana Assembly constituency:

- Country: India.
- State: Assam.
- District: Lakhimpur district .
- Lok Sabha Constituency: Lakhimpur Lok Sabha constituency
- Area Includes: Dhakuakhana MB, Dhakuakhana Dev. Block, Boginadi Dev. Block(Part), Ghilamara Dev. Block(Part).

== Members of Legislative Assembly ==
Election	Member	Party affiliation
1962	Lalit Kumar Doley	Indian National Congress
1967	Nameswar Pegu	Communist Party of India
1972	Lakhya Nath Doley	Indian National Congress
1978	Lakhya Nath Doley	Indian National Congress
1983	Ragunath Pamegam	Indian National Congress
1985	Bharat Narah	Independent
1991	Bharat Narah	Asom Gana Parishad
1996	Bharat Narah	Indian National Congress
2001	Bharat Narah	Indian National Congress
2006	Bharat Narah	Indian National Congress
2011	Naba Kumar Doley	Asom Gana Parishad
2016	Naba Kumar Doley	Bharatiya Janata Party
2021	Naba Kumar Doley	Bharatiya Janata Party

== Election results ==
=== 2026 ===
2026 Assam Legislative Assembly election: Dhakuakhana
Party	Candidate	Votes	%	±%
BJP	Naba Kumar Doley	92123	67.51	
INC	ANANDA NARAH	42051	30.81	
NOTA	NOTA	1111	0.81	
Margin of victory		50072		
Turnout		136464		
Rejected ballots				
Registered electors				
BJP hold		Swing		

=== 2021 ===
2021 Assam Legislative Assembly election: Dhakuakhana
Party	Candidate	Votes	%	±%
BJP	Naba Kumar Doley	86,382	50.83	−4.62
INC	Padmalochan Doley	76,786	45.18	+6.42
AJP	Satyajit Regan	2,988	1.76	N/A
VPI	Lalit Pegu	1,629	0.96	
SUCI(C)	Jutika Doley	905	0.53	+0.25
NOTA	None of the above	1,254	0.74	−0.01
Majority		9,596	5.65	
Turnout		1,69,944	80.54	−3.87
Registered electors		1,96,751		
BJP hold		Swing		

=== 2016 ===
2016 Assam Legislative Assembly election: Dhakuakhana
Party	Candidate	Votes	%	±%
BJP	Naba Kumar Doley	81,556	55.45	+53.98
INC	Bharat Narah	57,014	38.76	−5.64
CPI(M)	Lakhi Nath Sonowal	2,270	1.54	−0.06
Independent	Dilip Kumar Chowdhury	2,132	1.38	
Independent	Bhumi Ranjan Doley	1,855	1.26	
LDP	Dr. Rajendra Pegu	812	0.55	
SUCI(C)	Jutika Doley	422	0.28	
NOTA	None of the above	1,111	0.75	
Majority		24,542	16.69	
Turnout		1,47,072	84.41	+2.18
Registered electors		1,74,228		
BJP gain from AGP		Swing		

=== 2011 ===
2011 Assam Legislative Assembly election: Dhakuakhana
Party	Candidate	Votes	%	±%
AGP	Naba Kumar Doley	63,963	50.31	
INC	Bharat Narah	56,456	44.40	
CPI(M)	Gyana Nath Mili	2,033	1.60	
BJP	Lakhimai Pegu	1,873	1.47	
Independent	Ranjit Doley	1,130	0.9	
Independent	Memud Pagag	525	0.4	
Independent	Indrajit Narah	437	0.3	
SUCI(C)	Jutika Doley	398	0.3	
AITC	Bhaben Kumar Panyang	330	0.3	
Majority		7,507	5.91	
Turnout		1,27,145	82.23	−0.77
Registered electors		1,54,622		
AGP gain from INC		Swing		

=== 2006 ===
2006 Assam Legislative Assembly election: Dhakuakhana
Party	Candidate	Votes	%	±%
INC	Bharat Narah	55,645	43.2	
AGP	Mahesh Kumar Doley	43,005	33.4	
Independent	Paramananda Doley	12,273	9.5	
BJP	Deben Pegu	9,862	7.7	
Independent	Padmeswar Sonowal	2,768	2.2	
CPI(M)	Jadu Hazarika	2,694	2.1	
Independent	Bhaben Kumar Panyang	1,607	1.3	
Independent	Prasanda Deori	1,067	0.8	
Majority		12,672	9.8	
Turnout		1,29,101	83.00	+5.5
Registered electors		1,55,559		
INC hold		Swing		

=== 2001 ===
2001 Assam Legislative Assembly election: Dhakuakhana
Party	Candidate	Votes	%	±%
INC	Bharat Narah	41,190	42.77	
BJP	Deben Pegu	35,514	36.77	
Independent	Ranoj Pegu	18,531	19.24	
NCP	Karabi Sonowal	1,168	1.21	
Majority		5,776	6.0	
Turnout		98,321	77.5	−3.8
Registered electors		1,26,922		
INC hold		Swing		

=== 1996 ===
1996 Assam Legislative Assembly election: Dhakuakhana
Party	Candidate	Votes	%	±%
INC	Bharat Narah	29,752	35.46	
AGP	Mahesh Doley	27,119	32.32	
Independent	Paramananda Chayengia	17,522	20.88	
BJP	Lakheswar Sonowal	4,782	5.7	
JD	Sunadhar Patir	3,293	3.92	
AIIC(T)	Sashidhar Doley	534	0.6	
Independent	Moying Pegu	264	0.3	
Independent	Kumar Krishna Mohan Deuri Bharali	258	0.3	
Independent	Sarbeswar Mili	144	0.2	
Independent	Munindra Sonowal	130	0.2	
Independent	Thanuram Majinder	114	0.1	
Majority		2,633	3.14	
Turnout		87,782	81.3	+4.1
Registered electors		1,07,978		
INC hold		Swing		

=== 1991 ===
1991 Assam Legislative Assembly election: Dhakuakhana
Party	Candidate	Votes	%	±%
AGP	Bharat Narah	23,891	30.81	
INC	Paramananda Doley	18,505	23.86	
JD	Sonadhar Patir	12,616	16.27	
Independent	Bhagiram Kutum	11,348	14.63	
CPI	Lalit Pegu	3,330	4.29	
Independent	Raghu Nath Pamehgam	2,756	3.6	
PTC	Bibhichan Pegu	2,295	3.0	
NAGP	Debeswar Pegu	1249	1.6	
Independent	Mal Chandra Takoe	558	0.7	
Independent	Moying Chandra Pegu	480	0.6	
Independent	Chandra Kanta Doley	237	0.3	
Independent	Nobin Kutum	192	0.3	
Independent	Bhaba Doley	89	0.1	
Majority		5,386	6.95	
Turnout		82,078	77.2	+4.9
Registered electors		1,06,322		
AGP gain from Independent		Swing		

=== 1985 ===
1985 Assam Legislative Assembly election: Dhakuakhana
Party	Candidate	Votes	%	±%
Independent	Bharat Narah	30,113	49.56	
INC	Raghunath Pemagam	12,515	20.60	
CPI	Lalit Pegu	4,603	7.58	
PTC	Surya Kumar Chinte	3,145	5.18	
CPI(M)	Jadu Hazarika	3,134	5.18	
JP	Sunadhar Patir	2,518	4.14	
Independent	Gunabhi Lagachu	1,466	2.4	
IC(S)	Ramya Nath Pegu	1,456	2.4	
LKD	Moyin Pegu	1,420	2.3	
BJP	Dina Nath Saikia	298	0.5	
Independent	Rupeswar Patir	96	0.2	
Majority		17,598	28.96	
Turnout		64,463	72.3	
Registered electors		89,119		
Independent gain from INC		Swing		

=== 1983 ===
1983 Assam Legislative Assembly election: Dhakuakhana
Party	Candidate	Votes	%	±%
INC	Ragunath Pamegam	587	91.7	
CPI	Lalit Doley	35	5.5	
Independent	Surjya Kumar Chinte	5	0.8	
Independent	Ganaram Lagachu	4	0.6	
Independent	Moying Pegu	3	0.5	
Independent	Parama Doley	3	0.5	
Independent	Daulat Pegu	2	0.3	
Independent	Anandra Pegu	1	0.2	
Majority		552	84.9	
Turnout		650	0.9	
Registered electors		76,877		
INC hold		Swing		

=== 1978 ===
1978 Assam Legislative Assembly election: Dhakuakhana
Party	Candidate	Votes	%	±%
INC	Lakhya Nath Doley	9,548	20.4	
Independent	Jadu Hazarika	9,005	19.2	
CPI	Kameswar Pegu	8,927	19.1	
Independent	Pradip Kumar Saikia	6,333	13.5	
INC(I)	Raghunath Pamehgam	3,864	8.3	
PTC	Birachan Boley	3,473	7.4	
Independent	Monohar Sonowal	3,206	6.9	
Independent	Sonadhar Patir	2,478	5.3	
Majority		543	1.1	
Turnout		48,136	65.6	
Registered electors		73,439		
INC hold		Swing		

== See also ==
- List of constituencies of Assam Legislative Assembly
