= Arun Kumar Sarmah =

Indian politician

Dr. Arun Kumar Sarma

Member of Parliament, Lok Sabha
- In office 13 May 2004 – 16 May 2009
- Preceded by: Ranee Narah
- Succeeded by: Ranee Narah
- Constituency: Lakhimpur
- In office 8 May 1996 – 10 March 1998
- Preceded by: Balin Kuli
- Succeeded by: Ranee Narah
- Constituency: Lakhimpur

Member of Parliament, Rajya Sabha
- In office 27 March 1998 – 2 April 2004
- Preceded by: Matang Singh
- Succeeded by: Silvius Condpan
- Constituency: Assam

Personal details
- Born: 1 November 1956 (age 69) Japisajia, Lakhimpur, Assam
- Party: Asom Gana Parishad
- Spouse: Geetashri Sarma
- Children: 1 son and 1 daughter
- As of 25 September, 2006

Arun Kumar Sarmah (born 1 November 1956) is an Indian politician from Assam. He represented Lakhimpur Lok Sabha constituency from 1996 to 1998, and again from 2004 to 2009. Sarmah represented Assam in the Rajya Sabha from 1998 to 2004. He is a member of the Asom Gana Parishad.

== Career ==
=== Education ===
Sarmah is a graduate of Cotton College, Gauhati University, and University Law College, Gauhati University, and Assam Agricultural University. He was Assistant Professor, Faculty of Veterinary Science, at Assam Agricultural University, from 1987 to 1996 and a visiting scientist at the University of British Columbia in 1990. From 1978 to 1980, Sarma was General Secretary of College of Veterinary Science Students' Union, Gauhati University and from 1980 to 1985, Sarmah was a member of the central executive committee of All Assam Students Union.

=== Politics ===
Sarmah was elected to the Lok Sabha from Lakhimpur constituency in 1996 as an Asom Gana Parishad candidate and served until 1998. He was elected to the Rajya Sabha in 1998 as an Asom Gana Parishad candidate and represented Assam until 2004. He was elected for a second-term in the Lok Sabha from Lakhimpur constituency in 2004 and served until 2009. He was the Asom Gana Parishad candidate from Kaliabor in 2014.
