= Ghilamara =

- Area
- Location in Assam, India Ghilamara (India)
- Coordinates: 27.31°N 94.41°E
- Country: India
- State: Assam
- District: Lakhimpur

Area
  - Total: 269 km^{2} (104 sq mi)
  - Rank: 1

Population (2011)
  - Total: 80,205
  - Density: 298/km^{2} (772/sq mi)

Languages
  - Official: Assamese
- Time zone: UTC+5:30 (IST)
- Vehicle registration: AS
- Website: www.lakhimpur.nic.in

Ghilamara is a small town situated in the far east of Lakhimpur district in Assam.

== Etymology ==
There is a lack of historical data to detail the source of the name Ghilamara. Based on legends and local oral folklore, the name Ghilamara is originated with the story that revolves around Ghila, a Chutia rebel leader. The Ahom army under Sukhaamphaa (1552–1603) defeated the Chutia rebels and killed Ghila in a paddy field which was named thereafter as Ghilamara field - which means Field where Ghila was killed.

== Geographical description ==
Situated on the border of Lakhimpur and Dheamji districts; Ghilamara is a town in the district of Lakhimpur, Assam, India. Dhemaji lies to the east, Gogamukh is to the north, Brahmaputra is to the south and the Subansiri River is on the west of Ghilamara.

== Weather ==
As the place is situated in bank of Arunachal hill, the weather is pretty cold in the month of January and very hot in the month Jul-Aug. The average temperature in winter season is from 5 to 20 °C (41 to 68 °F) and in summer it increases to 18–36 °C (64–97 °F). Annual rain ranges from 200 to 250 cm (78.5 to 98.5 in).

== History ==
This area was under the Chutia kings until the Ahoms annexed it in 1523 A.D. At least four copper plates have been recovered from the region till date which were issued by Chutia kings between 14th and 15th century. These include:

- One issued by king Satyanarayan in 1392 A.D. at Dhenukhana.
- One issued by king Satyanarayan originally in 1393 A.D. and revised by king Dharmanarayan in 1435 A.D.
- One issued by king Lakshminaryan in 1401 A.D. at Ghilamora.
- One by king Dhirnarayan in 1522 A.D.

== Infrastructure ==
=== Healthcare ===
1. 1 Govt. Hospital
2. 2 Primary health centers

=== Veterinary ===
1. 1 Veterinary hospital

=== Water ===
1. 2763 tube-wells
2. 65 wells

=== Roads ===
1. Total surface of road: 26km
2. Total un-surface road: 65km

=== Banking ===
1. Nationalized bank (1)

United Bank of India (UBI)

2. Gramin Bank (1)

Assam Gramin Vikash Bank

== Economy ==
The main sector is agriculture.

Once famous bird sanctuary "Bordoibam Pakshi Uddyan" is now in very pitiful shape due to lack of attention from authorities. There is an industrial training institute) building constructed in the center point of Ghilamara which is yet to start.

== Educational Institutions ==
Ghilamara has a good number of institutions there, starting from primary education to higher education. Established in 1961, North Bank college is the second oldest institution of higher education in the undivided Lakhimpur District.

1. North Bank College
2. Ghilamara Girls College
3. Ghilamara Model Higher Secondary School
4. Ghilamara Town HS School
5. Kanta Khanikar High School
6. Ghilamara Public High School
7. Ghilamara Girls MV School
8. Ghilamara Model Lower Primary School
9. Sankardev Shishu Niketan Ghilamara
10. Ghilamara Music and Art College
11. North Bank Fine Art College
12. Ghilamara Boys' MV School
13. Ghilamara Na-Pukhuri High School
14. Dakhin Ghilamara High School
15. Ghilamara Town LP School
16. Pragati English Medium School
17. Medhabi Jatiya Bidyalaya
18. Suvidya Residential School, Ghilamara
19. Subanshiri Valley Academy, Ghilamara
20. Ghilamara Adarsha Lower Primary School
21. Govt. offices

1. Lakhimpur State Road Division, (PWD), Ghilamara
2. Lakhimpur State Road Sub-Division, (PWD), Ghilamara
3. PHE Division
4. PHE Sub-Division
5. Water Resource Sub-Division
6. Subansiri Revenue Circle, Ghilamara
7. ASEB, Sub-Division
8. Seri-culture Office
9. Block Elementary Education Office
10. Ghilamara Development Block
