= Jiban Gogoi =

Indian politician (born 1975)

Jiban Gogoi (born 1975) is an Indian politician from Assam. He is a member of the Assam Legislative Assembly from the Sissiborgaon Assembly constituency in Dhemaji district representing the Bharatiya Janata Party.

== Early life ==
Gogoi is from Dhemaji, Dhemaji district, Assam. He is the son of the late Ghana Gogoi. He studied Class 12 at Gogamukh College, Dhemaji and passed the examinations conducted by Assam Higher Secondary Education Council (AHSEC) in 1995. He is a cultivator and his wife is an ICDS Anganwadi teacher. He declared assets worth Rs.20 lakhs in his affidavit to the Election Commission of India.

== Career ==
Gogoi won the Sissiborgaon Assembly constituency representing the Bharatiya Janata Party in the 2026 Assam Legislative Assembly election. He polled 75,758 votes and defeated his nearest rival, Dulal Chandra Boruah of the Raijor Dal, by margin of 40,593 votes.
