= Naoboicha Assembly constituency =

Constituency of the Assam legislative assembly in India

Naoboicha
- Constituency No. 75 for the Assam Legislative Assembly

Constituency details
- Country: India
- Region: Northeast India
- State: Assam
- District: Lakhimpur
- Lok Sabha constituency: Lakhimpur
- Established: 1967
- Reservation: SC

Naoboicha Assembly constituency is one of the 126 assembly constituencies of Assam, a northeastern state of India. Naoboicha is part of the Lakhimpur Lok Sabha constituency.

This constituency is reserved for Scheduled Caste candidates since 2023.

== Members of Legislative Assembly ==
Election	Member	Party affiliation
1967	Bhupen Hazarika	Independent
1972	Lila Kanta Das	Indian National Congress
1978	Afazuddin Ahmed	Independent
1983	Afazuddin Ahmed	Indian National Congress
1985	Jagot Hazarika	Independent
1991	Moni Kumar Subba	Indian National Congress
1996	Moni Kumar Subba	Indian National Congress
1998^	Moniram Pathori	Asom Gana Parishad
2001	Sultan Sadik	Independent
2006	Sanjay Raj Subba	Independent
2011	Sanjay Raj Subba	Indian National Congress
2016	Mamun Imdadul Haque Chawdhury	All India United Democratic Front
2021	Bharat Narah	Indian National Congress
2026	Joy Prakash Das	Indian National Congress

^ Indicates Bye-Elections

== Election results ==
=== 2026 ===
2026 Assam Legislative Assembly election: Naoboicha
Party	Candidate	Votes	%	±%
INC	Joy Prakash Das	86,981	56.66	+29.32
AGP	Basanta Das	63,230	41.19	+22.96
AAP	Achyut Das	1,158	0.75	N/A
NOTA	NOTA	957	0.62	−0.47
Margin of victory		23,751	15.47	+13.60
Turnout		1,53,502		
Rejected ballots				
Registered electors				
INC hold		Swing		

=== 2021 ===
2021 Assam Legislative Assembly election: Naoboicha
Party	Candidate	Votes	%	±%
INC	Bharat Narah	52,905	27.34	+6.47
Independent	Azizur Rahman	49,292	25.47	N/A
Independent	Rao Gajendra Singh	40,710	21.04	N/A
AGP	Jayanta Khaund	35,279	18.23	+13.26
NPP	Biri Joy	3,779	1.95	N/A
BGP	Bikash Debnath	3,071	1.59	N/A
AJP	Putali Kayasta	1934	1.00	N/A
Independent	Abdul Goffur	1300	0.67	N/A
Independent	Saheba Ahmed	1032	0.53	+0.03
SUCI(C)	Anupam Chutia	781	0.4	−0.05
RUC	Ubaidur Rahman	735	0.38	N/A
NCP	Dipak Saikia	581	0.3	N/A
NOTA	None of the above	2,102	1.09	+0.37
Majority		3,613	1.87	+1.11
Turnout		1,93,501	85.19	−2.94
Registered electors		2,27,134		+23%
INC gain from AIUDF		Swing		

=== 2016 ===
2016 Assam Legislative Assembly election: Naoboicha
Party	Candidate	Votes	%	±%
AIUDF	Mamun Imdadul Haque Chawdhury	56,003	34.51	+12.75
BJP	Rao Gajendra Singh	54,770	33.75	+15.95
INC	Sanjay Raj Subba	33,862	20.87	−6.19
AGP	Jayanta Khaund	8,070	4.97	−4.38
Independent	Simanta Boruah	2,787	1.71	N/A
Independent	Pawan Majhi Sautal	2,481	1.52	N/A
Independent	Saheba Ahmed	827	0.50	N/A
SUCI(C)	Anupam Chutia	737	0.45	−0.09
Independent	Dr. Debabrat Gogoi	640	0.39	N/A
Independent	Sofiqul Islam	512	0.31	N/A
Independent	Dilwar Hussain	371	0.22	N/A
NOTA	None of the above	1,176	0.72	N/A
Majority		1,233	0.76	−4.54
Turnout		1,62,236	88.13	+5.72
Registered electors		1,84,078		+17.66%
AIUDF gain from INC		Swing	+9.65	

=== 2011 ===
2011 Assam Legislative Assembly election: Naoboicha
Party	Candidate	Votes	%	±%
INC	Sanjay Raj Subba	33,946	27.06	−7.44
AIUDF	Mamun Imdadul Haque Chowdhury	27,288	21.76	+20.96
BJP	Rao Gajendra Singh	22,328	17.80	+7.76
Independent	Sultan Medhi	16,855	13.44	New
AGP	Phanidhar Baruah	11,721	9.35	+0.65
Independent	Ganesh Pradhan	4,207	3.35	New
Independent	Dr. Pradip Patra	2,938	2.34	New
Independent	Jayanta Khound	1,995	1.59	New
AITC	Vinod Pasi	1,671	1.33	New
Independent	Eunus Ali	942	0.75	New
SUCI(C)	Sushil Bora	673	0.54	
Independent	Md. Khalilur Rahman	463	0.37	
Independent	Shyamal Hazarika	398	0.32	
Majority		6,658	5.30	+2.10
Turnout		1,25,425	80.17	−1.23
Registered electors		1,56,449		+6.96%
INC gain from Independent		Swing		

=== 2006 ===
2006 Assam Legislative Assembly election: Naoboicha
Party	Candidate	Votes	%	±%
Independent	Sanjay Raj Subba	44,869	37.7	New
INC	Sultan Sadik	41,027	34.5	+14.7
BJP	Rao Gajendra Singh	12,351	10.4	−1.9
AGP	Minakhi Gohain Baruah	10,288	8.7	New
RSP	Lusian Kawria	3,570	3.0	New
Independent	Md. Hassan Ali	3,376	2.8	New
AIUDF	Md. Nazrul Islam	999	0.8	New
NCP	Ratul Borah	915	0.8	
Independent	Md. Ruful Amin	852	0.7	
AGP(P)	Md. Abdul Zalil	746	0.6	
Majority		3,842	3.2	−4.7
Turnout		1,19,082	81.4	0.0
Registered electors		1,46,266		+22%
Independent gain from Independent		Swing		

=== 2001 ===
2001 Assam Legislative Assembly election: Naoboicha
Party	Candidate	Votes	%	±%
Independent	Sultan Sadik	29,813	31.1	New
Independent	Moniram Pathari	22,105	23.0	New
INC	Sanjay Raj Subba	18,975	19.8	−13.5
BJP	Prodeep Sarmah	11,820	12.3	+7.8
Independent	Mridul Saikia	5,695	5.9	New
JD(U)	Bane Bhagat Orang	4,794	3.1	
Independent	Lalchand Kardong	1,057	1.1	
NCP	Abdul Quadir	797	0.8	
Independent	Lakhi Phukan	393	0.4	
Majority		7,708	7.9	−1.6
Turnout		97,418	81.4	+0.5
Registered electors		119,724		+28%
Independent hold		Swing		

=== 1996 ===
1996 Assam Legislative Assembly election: Naoboicha
Party	Candidate	Votes	%	±%
INC	Mani Kr. Subba	23,800	33.3	−15.3
Independent	Nurul Haque Chowdhury	16,649	23.3	New
CPI	Haren Baruah	15,166	21.2	+17.4
Independent	Simon Tirkey	8,591	12.0	New
BJP	Lakhi Phukan	3,209	4.5	New
Independent	Lekhan Narah	2,210	3.1	
Independent	Bipul Goswami	622	0.9	
JD	Sunaram Bhuyan	435	0.6	−1.1
Independent	Jiba Rajkhowa	334	0.5	
AIIC(T)	Kanak Gogoi	199	0.3	
Majority		7,151	9.5	−22.3
Turnout		75,573	80.9	+3.4
Registered electors		93,399		−5%
INC hold		Swing		

=== 1991 ===
1991 Assam Legislative Assembly election: Naoboicha
Party	Candidate	Votes	%	±%
INC	Mani Kr. Subba	34,130	48.6	+17.5
AGP	Sarbeswar Borah	9,868	14.0	New
Independent	Rafiuddin Ahmed	6,858	9.8	
NAGP	Prabin Saikia	3,913	5.6	
PTC	Birachon Doley	3,443	4.9	
CPI	Horen Boruah	2,679	3.8	
Independent	Jitendra Bhuyan	2,489	3.5	
Independent	Tarun Doley	1,818	2.6	
Independent	Kaji Afajuddin Ahmed	1,293	1.8	
JD	Deben Baruah	1,220	1.7	+0.9
Independent	Gobin Neog	678	1.0	
Majority		24,262	31.8	+25.4
Turnout		76,404	77.5	−5.2
Registered electors		98,638		+27%
INC gain from Independent		Swing		

=== 1985 ===
1985 Assam Legislative Assembly election: Naoboicha
Party	Candidate	Votes	%	±%
Independent	Jagot Hazarika	22,334	38.1	
INC	Afazuddin Ahmed	18,256	31.1	
Independent	Motiur Rahman	7,326	12.5	
Independent	Stephan Pandu	2,307	3.9	
Independent	Nobin Chandra Pegu	1,565	2.7	
Independent	Makbul Hussain	1,362	2.3	
Independent	Torun Doley	979	1.7	
Independent	Surpa Kurmi	945	1.6	
Independent	Rajendra Nath Borpatra	719	1.2	
Independent	Samsul Haque	573	1.0	
Independent	Prafulla Ch. Dekaboruah	519	0.9	
JD	Bogiram Zora	473	0.8	
Independent	Umed Ali	412	0.7	
PTC	Birason Doley	407	0.7	
Independent	Megha Ghatowal	361	0.6	
Independent	Md. Taher Ali	89	0.2	
Majority		4,078	6.4	
Turnout		64,012	82.7	
Registered electors		77,385		
Independent gain from INC		Swing		

1967 Assam Legislative Assembly election: Naoboicha
Party	Candidate	Votes	%	±%
Independent	Bhupen Hazarika	14		
INC	Das			
Majority				
Turnout				
Registered electors				
Independent gain from INC		Swing		

== See also ==
- List of constituencies of Assam Legislative Assembly
