= Afazuddin Ahmed =

Indian politician

Member of Assam Legislative Assembly
- In office 1978–1985
- Preceded by: Lila Kanta Das
- Succeeded by: Jagot Hazarika
- Constituency: Naoboicha

Personal details
- Party: Indian National Congress

Afazuddin Ahmed was a former legislator of Assam who won the Assam Legislative Assembly elections in 1978 and 1983 from Naoboicha constituency.
