= Bihpuria =

- town
- Location in Assam, India Bihpuria (India)
- Coordinates: 27°1′9.944″N 93°55′0.115″E
- Country: India
- State: Assam
- District: Lakhimpur

Government
  - Body: Bihpuria Municipality Board

Area
  - Total: 45 km^{2} (17 sq mi)
- Elevation: 102 m (335 ft)

Population (2011)
  - Total: 15,307
  - Density: 340/km^{2} (880/sq mi)

Languages
  - Official: Assamese
- Time zone: UTC+5:30 (IST)
- PIN: 784161
- ISO 3166 code: IN-AS
- Vehicle registration: AS 07

Bihpuria (IPA: ˈbɪəˌpʊərɪə) is a small town in Lakhimpur district in the state of Assam, India. Bihpuria is located at 27.03°N 93.90°E.

== Demographics ==
As of 2001 India census, Bihpuria had a population of 10,867. Males constitute 53% of the population and females 47%. Bihpuria has an average literacy rate of 77%, higher than the national average of 59.5%; with male literacy of 82% and female literacy of 73%. 11% of the population is under 6 years of age.

== Politics ==
Bihpuria is part of Tezpur (Lok Sabha constituency). Dr. Amiya Kumar Bhuyan is the current MLA of the Bihpuria Constituency.

== See also ==
- Japjup
