= Dilip Moran =

Indian politician

Dilip Moran is a politician who was a member of the Assam Legislative Assembly from the Doom Dooma constituency in India from 2011 to 2016. He belongs to the Bhartiya Janata Party.
