= Rupesh Gowala =

Indian politician

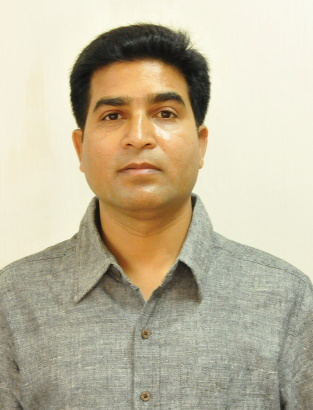
- Official portrait

Cabinet Minister, Assam
- In office 9 December 2024 – 11 May 2026
- Chief Minister: Himanta Biswa Sarma
- Departments: Welfare of Tea Tribes and Adivasi; Labour and Welfare; Prisons, Home Guards and Civil Defense
- Preceded by: Sanjoy Kishan
- Succeeded by: Rameswar Teli

Member, Assam Legislative Assembly
- Incumbent
- Assumed office 21 May 2021
- Preceded by: Durga Bhumij
- Constituency: Doom Dooma

Personal details
- Party: Bharatiya Janata Party
- Profession: Politician

Rupesh Gowala is an Indian politician and member of Bharatiya Janata Party from Assam. He is an MLA, elected from the Doom Dooma constituency in the 2021 Assam Legislative Assembly election.
