= Ranee Narah =

Indian politician

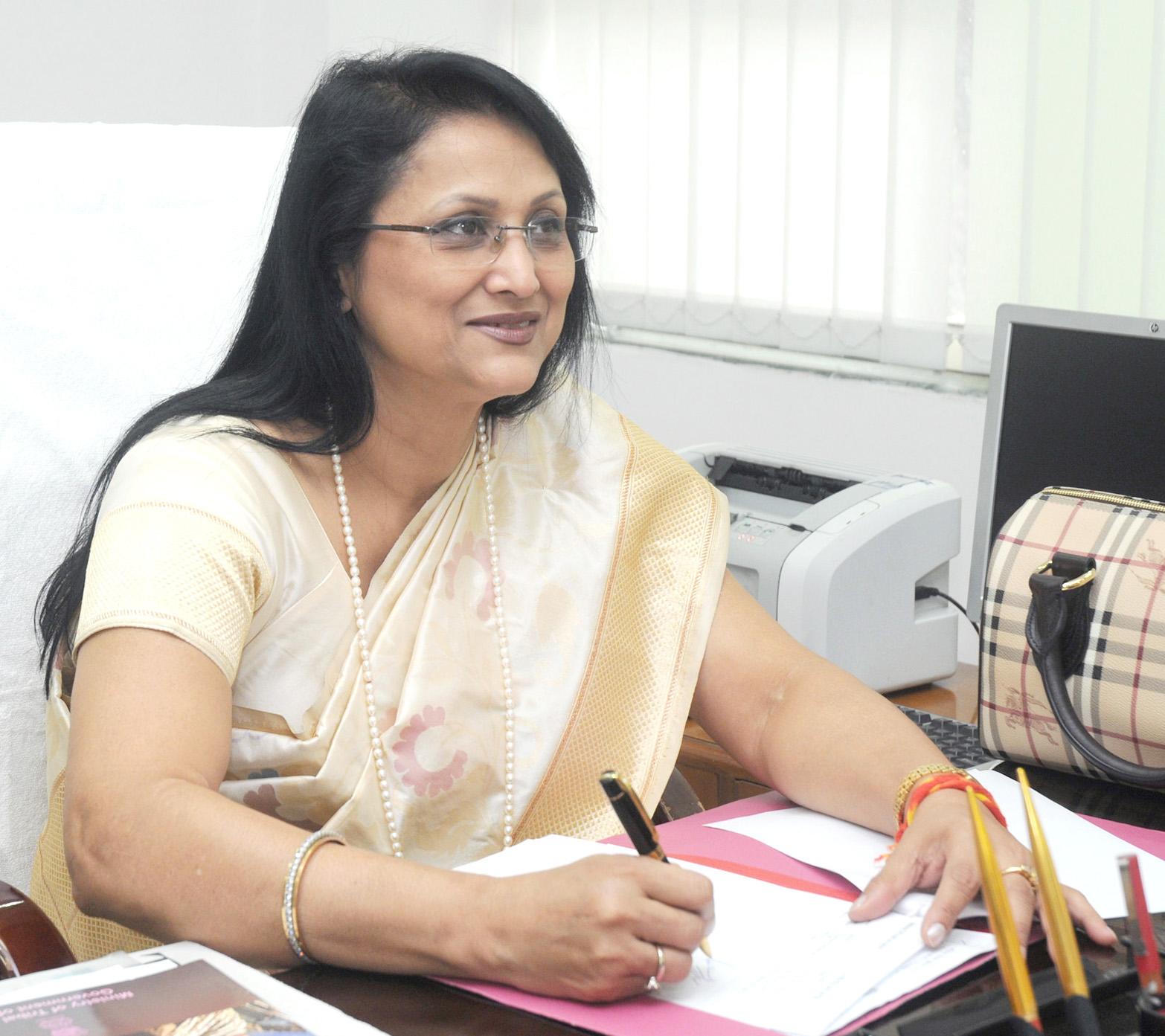
- Official portrait, 2012

Member of Parliament, Rajya Sabha
- In office 3 April 2016 – 2 April 2022
- Preceded by: Naznin Faruque
- Succeeded by: Pabitra Margherita
- Constituency: Assam

Minister of State of Tribal Affairs, Government of India
- In office 28 October 2012 – 23 May 2014
- Prime Minister: Manmohan Singh
- Preceded by: Mahadeo Singh Khandela
- Succeeded by: Mansukhbhai Vasava

Member of Parliament, Lok Sabha
- In office 16 May 2009 – 16 May 2014
- Preceded by: Arun Kumar Sarmah
- Succeeded by: Sarbananda Sonowal
- Constituency: Lakhimpur
- In office 10 March 1998 – 13 May 2004
- Preceded by: Arun Kumar Sarmah
- Succeeded by: Arun Kumar Sarmah
- Constituency: Lakhimpur

Personal details
- Born: Jahanara Choudhury; 31 October 1960 (age 66) Guwahati, Assam, India
- Party: Indian National Congress (1995–present)
- Other political affiliations: Asom Gana Parishad (1988–1995)
- Spouse: Bharat Narah (m. 1986)
- Children: 2 sons
- Education: Gauhati University

Ranee Narah (born 31 October 1960) is an Indian politician from Assam and a member of the Indian National Congress. She represented Assam as a Member of Parliament in the Rajya Sabha, the upper house of Parliament, from 2016 to 2022. She also represented Lakhimpur in the Lok Sabha, the lower house of Parliament, from 1998 to 2004, and again from 2009 to 2014. Narah served as the Minister of State for Tribal Affairs in the Union Government of India from 2012 to 2014. She was also Deputy Chief Whip of the Congress Parliamentary Party in the Lok Sabha from 2009 to 2012.

== Early life ==
Ranee Narah was born as Jahanara Choudhary in Guwahati's Gandhibasti to Dil Mohamad and Nurjahan Chaudhury. She was raised in an Assamese Muslim family. She attained her High School Leaving Certificate in 1977, and studied at Handique Girls College from 1977 to 1979. She graduated with a B.A. degree from K.R.G. College, Gauhati University, in 1981.

Choudhary played zonal cricket and made her debut for the Assam women's cricket team in 1975-76. She captained the Assam state team before retiring as a professional player. She was the first woman centurion from Assam. She also represented Assam in weightlifting, shot put, discus and volleyball.

Narah is married to Bharat Narah, a six-term member of the Assam Legislative Assembly, and former cabinet minister in the Assam government. The couple married in 1986, and she converted to Hinduism, the religion of her indigenous tribal husband whose Mishing people live mostly in Upper Assam and Arunachal Pradesh. Narah was a participant in the Assam Movement from 1979 to 1985.

== Sports administration ==
After retiring from professional cricket, Narah became involved in sports administration. She served as the President of the Women's Cricket Association of India (WCAI) for three terms and was also the President of the Assam Women's Cricket Association. The Indian women's cricket team reached the final of the 2005 Women's Cricket World Cup. She merged the WCAI with the Board of Control for Cricket in India (BCCI) in 2006 and became a BCCI member. She was also vice-president of the Assam Cricket Association and the Assam Football Association.

== Political career ==
Narah joined the Asom Gana Parishad in 1988, and was elected General Secretary of the party's women's wing, the Asom Mahila Parishad. She joined the Indian National Congress in 1995 after ideological disagreements with the Asom Gana Parishad leadership. She was elected General Secretary and Vice President of the Assam Pradesh Youth Congress in 1996–1997. She was elected President of the Assam Pradesh Youth Congress in 1998. In 1998, she was elected also to the Lok Sabha from Lakhimpur constituency by defeating the Asom Gana Parishad candidate and incumbent, Arun Kumar Sarmah. She was re-elected from Lakhimpur in 1999, defeating the Asom Gana Parishad candidate, Sarbananda Sonowal, who was the President of the All Assam Students' Union. She began lobbying for the construction of an airport at North Lakhimpur, which culminated in 2003 with the inauguration of Lilabari Airport. As a Member of Parliament until 2004, Narah was on the committees for Urban and Rural Development, Libraries, and Communications during the 12th Lok Sabha, and on the committees for Defence, Home Affairs, Civil Aviation, Petroleum and Natural Gas, and Urban and Rural Development during the 13th Lok Sabha.

As Assam Pradesh Youth Congress President, Narah led an Assam Bandh in November 2000 demanding the imposition of President's rule against the Asom Gana Parishad government of Chief Minister, Prafulla Kumar Mahanta, whose party was a constituent member of the National Democratic Alliance federal government. Between 1997 and 2001, the insurgency in Assam had led to 1548 deaths, including 333 security personnel. The mass-killings of Hindi-speaking migrants by the United Liberation Front of Assam became a catalyst for the bandh. She was imprisoned by the Asom Gana Parishad government, and the federal government had to authorise military operations after another round of mass-killings in December 2000. In 2003, Narah was elected to the National Council of the Indian Youth Congress.

In 2004, Narah was nominated as the candidate for Lakhimpur despite opposition from Assam Chief Minister, Tarun Gogoi, who was of the Indian National Congress party, and who received the support of several party MLA's from within the constituency. She lost the election to the Asom Gana Parishad candidate, Arun Kumar Sarmah, who was an incumbent Rajya Sabha Member of Parliament for Assam. In 2009, Narah was nominated as the candidate for Lakhimpur despite opposition from the Chief Minister, Tarun Gogoi, and many party MLA's from within Lakhimpur constituency. She won the election by defeating the Asom Gana Parishad candidate and incumbent, Arun Kumar Sarmah. After re-entering parliament in 2009, Narah was appointed Deputy Chief Whip of the Congress Parliamentary Party in the Lok Sabha. She was on the committees for Estimates, Transport, Tourism, Culture, and Information and Broadcasting from 2009 to 2012 during the 15th Lok Sabha.

The President of India, Pranab Mukherjee, administering the oath of office as minister of state to Ranee Narah, at a swearing-in ceremony, at the Rashtrapati Bhavan, in New Delhi on 28 October 2012

In 2012, Narah was inducted into the Union Cabinet of India as Minister of State in the Tribal Affairs ministry. In 2014, she lost her re-election campaign from Lakhimpur against the Bharatiya Janata Party candidate and state president, Sarbananda Sonowal, who became the Chief Minister after the 2016 Assam Legislative Assembly election. In 2016 Rajya Sabha elections, Narah was elected as a Member of Parliament from Assam. She received 47 votes, the most of any candidate in the Assam Legislative Assembly. She represented Assam in the Rajya Sabha until 2022. She was on the committee for Petroleum and Natural Gas until 2019, and on the committees for Industry and the Development of North Eastern Region until 2022. In 2024, the Indian National Congress did not nominate Narah as the candidate from Lakhimpur.

== Personal life ==
Narah's marriage with Bharat Narah has repeatedly come under attack by supporters of the Asom Gana Parishad and the Bharatiya Janata Party, including conspiracy theories that she was a spy who persuaded her husband — an Asom Gana Parishad legislator — to join the Indian National Congress alongside her in 1995, and that their marriage in 1986 was a "coup against the first right-wing government of the state".
