= Doom Dooma =

Town in Assam, India

Doom Dooma Dum Duma
- Town
- Location in Assam, India Doom Dooma (India) Doom Dooma (Asia)
- Coordinates: 27.57°N 95.57°E
- Country: India
- State: Assam
- District: Tinsukia

Government
  - Body: Doom Dooma Municipal Board
- Elevation: 114 m (374 ft)

Population (2011)
  - Total: 21,572

Languages
  - Official: Assamese
- Time zone: UTC+5:30 (IST)
- PIN: 786151
- ISO 3166 code: IN-AS
- Vehicle registration: AS

Doom Dooma (Pron:/ˌduːm ˈduːmə/) is a town and a town committee in Tinsukia district in the state of Assam, India.

== Demographics ==
Religions in Doom Dooma (Census 2011)
Religion	Percent
Hindus	80.75%
Muslims	17.98%
Others	1.26%

Doom Dooma is a municipality area in district of Tinsukia, Assam. The town is divided into ten wards for which elections are held every five years. Doom Dooma has a population of 21,572 of which 11,476 are males and 10,096 are females as per report released by Census India 2011.

Population of children within age group 0-6 is 2423 which is 11.23% of total population. The sex ratio is 880 against state average of 958. Child sex ratio in Doom Dooma is around 877 compared to Assam state average of 962. Literacy rate of Doom Dooma is 85.52% which is higher than state average of 72.19%. In Doom Dooma, male literacy is around 89.38% and female literacy rate is 81.15%.

Doom Dooma town has total administration over 4,243 houses to which it supplies basic amenities like water and sewerage. It is also authorised to build roads within municipality limits and impose taxes on properties coming under its jurisdiction.

The town has 80.75% Hindus and 17.98% Muslims.

Majority of the population are adherents of Hinduism, followed by a large Muslim population.

== Politics ==
Doom Dooma is part of Lakhimpur (Lok Sabha constituency). Elections are held every five years just like in other parts of Assam and people participate in the elections as candidates or voters. Currently there are two political parties which are active in the region- the Congress and the Bharatiya Janata Party. Doom Dooma (Vidhan Sabha constituency) is one of the 125 assembly constituencies of Assam. In this recent election Bharatiya Janata party had won the election.

== Education ==
DoomDooma College, established in 1967, is a general degree college affiliated to the Dibrugarh University.
