= Dhakuakhana =

Dhakuakhana Habung
- Area
- Location in Assam, India Dhakuakhana (India)
- Coordinates: 27.3114122°N 94.456805°E
- Country: India
- State: Assam
- District: Lakhimpur

Languages
  - Official: Assamese
- Time zone: UTC+5:30 (IST)
- Postal Index Number: 787055
- ISO 3166 code: IN-AS
- Vehicle registration: AS07

Dhakuakhana is a sub-division of Lakhimpur district in the north-eastern state of Assam, India.

== History ==
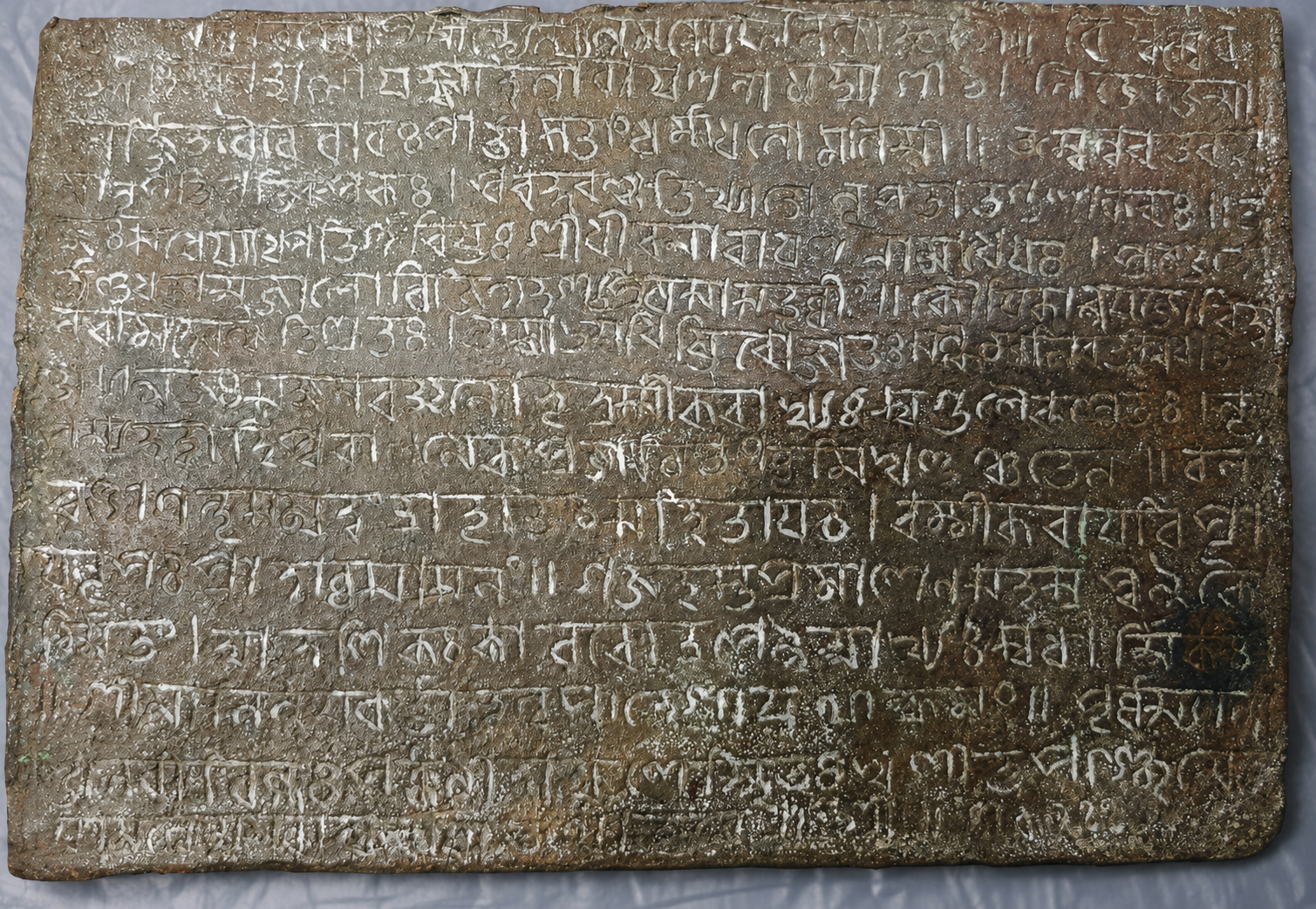
The copper plate inscription of a land grant made to Brahmins in 1522 by the Chutia king Dhirnarayan in Dhakuakhana.

It started functioning in 1989 when a naturalist-bureaucrat Dr. Anwaruddin Choudhury of the Assam Civil Service joined as the first (founder) sub-divisional officer (civil).

== Geography ==
This place is bounded on the east by Brahmaputra and Dhemaji, to the west, by Subansiri river and North Lakhimpur sub-division . To the north Dhemaji and to the south, Majuli river island and Brahmaputra river.

Geographical position of Dhakuakhana is between 27.60 degree to 27.35 degree north latitude and 94.24 degree to 94.42 degree east longitude.

== Demography ==
Dhakuakhana consists of diversified population of several ethnic communities including Mishing, Kaibarta, Ahom, Chutia, Sut, Deori, Koch. Majority of the population are Hindus, however there are also population of diverse faith such as Christianity and Islam. The tribal community Mishings also follow their age old tradition of worshipping Donyi-Polo, Sun and Moon God And the Deori community follows Kundisim, Worshing their ancestors and deity Kundimama, while the majority of the Kaibarta community in Dhakuakhana nowadays follows the Mayamara Vaishnavism sect.

== Education ==
Some notable education institutions of Dhakuakhana are:

- Dhakuakhana College
- Harhi College
- Dhakuakhana Commerce College
- Pachim Dhakuakhana H.S. School
- College of Teacher Education (B.ED) Dhakuakhana
- Dhakuakhana Model H.S. School
- Dhakuakhana Girls H.S. School
- Central School
- Jatiya Vidyalaya
- ST. Thomas School
- Sankardev Shisu Niketon
- Srimanta Sankardev Vidyalaya
- Dhakuakhana Govt M.V. School

== Economy ==
The economy is mostly agrarian with majority of the population involved in agriculture and allied activities. There is also a cottage industry of silk present in the region.

== Notable people ==
- Homen Borgohain, eminent Assamese author and journalist
- Dr Anwaruddin Choudhury, eminent naturalist, author and the founder-SDO (civil) of Dhakuakhana
- Chandradhar Chamuah
- Tabu Taid, renowned author and educationist
- Ganesh Gogoi (Known as Paporir Kobi).
