= Panigaon =

- Town
- Location in Madhya Pradesh, India Panigaon (India)
- Coordinates: 22°43′30″N 76°34′36″E
- Country: India
- State: Madhya Pradesh
- District: Dewas

Languages
  - Official: Hindi
- Time zone: UTC+5:30 (IST)
- PIN: 455440
- Telephone code: 07273
- ISO 3166 code: IN-MP
- Vehicle registration: MP-41

Panigaon is a town and a Panchayat in Dewas district in the Indian state of Madhya Pradesh. Panigaon is a major agricultural production area in Madhya Pradesh. Earlier.As of 2001 India census,
