= Mamun Imdadul Haque Chawdhury =

Indian politician

Dr. Mamun Imdadul Haque Chawdhury

Member of Assam Legislative Assembly
- In office May 2016 – May 2021
- Preceded by: Sanjay Raj Subba
- Succeeded by: Bharat Narah
- Constituency: Naoboicha (Vidhan Sabha constituency)

Personal details
- Born: 1990 (age 35–36)
- Party: Aam Aadmi Party
- Education: MSc Cotton University
- Profession: Politician, Advocate

Mamun Imdadul Haque Chawdhury is an All India United Democratic Front politician from Assam, India. He was elected in the Assam Legislative Assembly election in 2016 from the Naoboicha constituency. A former MLA of AIUDF, Choudhury officially joined the Aam Aadmi Party on 16 May 2022 in Guwahati.
