= North Lakhimpur College =

College in Assam, India

North Lakhimpur College (Autonomous)
- Other names: NLC
- Motto: आऩो भद्रा: क्रतवो यन्तु बिश्वत:
- Motto in English: Let noble thoughts come from all directions ...
- Type: Public
- Established: 1952; 74 years ago (as College); December 1, 2023; 2 years ago (as University)
- Accreditation: NAAC; UGC
- Academic affiliations: UGC
- Academic staff: 100
- Administrative staff: 120
- Students: 4200
- Undergraduates: 3000
- Postgraduates: 500
- Other students: 700
- Location: North Lakhimpur, Lakhimpur, Assam, India; 27.2307°N 94.0894°E
- Campus: Urban
- Colours: Blackish blue & white
- Website: www.nlc.ac.in

North Lakhimpur College was a former college located in the Lakhimpur District of Assam. It held the distinction of being the first autonomous college in the state. On 1st December 2023, it was upgraded to a state university by the Government of Assam.

The college was established in 1952. In 2012, North Lakhimpur College was accredited with an "A" grade by the NAAC with a CGPA of 3.08.

On 30 May 2013, North Lakhimpur College received a letter from the University Grants Commission granting it the status of an autonomous college. North Lakhimpur College is the first college from Assam to receive this status from the UGC.

== History ==
North Lakhimpur College was established on 3rd July 1952 in the then remote and underdeveloped region of North Lakhimpur.

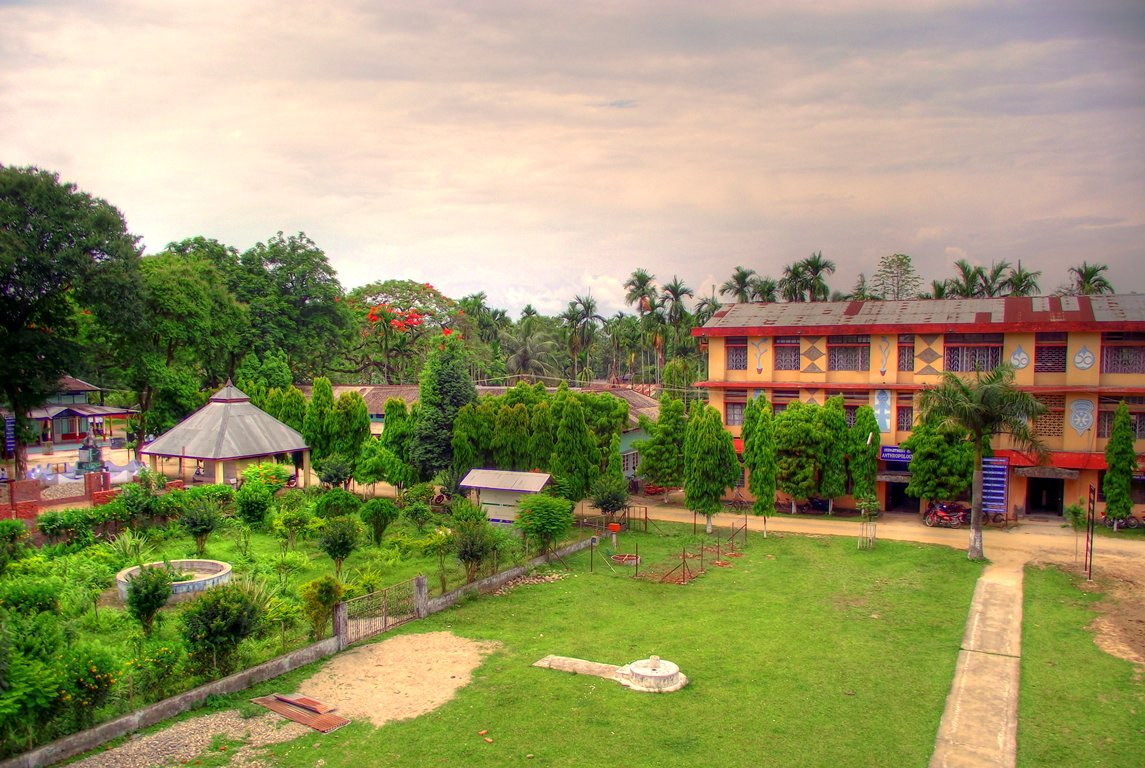
Academic Building of North Lakhimpur College

== Organisation and administration ==
=== Governance ===
Md. Nasim Ali Hazarika served as the inaugural principal of the college from 1952 to 1954, whereas Dr. Biman Ch. Chetia held the position until the University transitioned to a state University in February 2012.

==== Past principals ====
1. Md. Nasim Ali Hazarika, MA, LLB (1952–1954)
2. Dr. Biswanarayan Sastri, MA, PhD (1954–1958)
3. Jogananda Borgohain, MA (1958–1985)
4. Labanya Charan Deka, MA, LLB (I/C) (1985–1986)
5. Harendra Deva Goswami, MA (I/C) (1986–1989)
6. Hemendra Kumar Gogoi, MSc, MPhil (1989–2001)
7. Dibyajyoti Phukan, MA (I/C) (March 2001–Sept 2001)
8. Tilak Ch. Baruah, MSc, MPhil (I/C) (Oct 2001–July 2004)
9. Dr. Jugada Phukan, MA, PhD, (I/C) (Aug 2004–Sept 2004)
10. Achyut Ch. Mahanta, MA (I/C) (Nov 2004–July 2005)
11. Dr. Suryabhushan Pandu, MSc, PhD, FISPP (Aug 2005–Dec 2005)
12. Dr. Budhin Baruah, MSc, PhD (Jan 2006–Dec 2011)
13. Dr. Biman Ch. Chetia, MSc, PhD (Feb 2012- Sept 2024)

=== Departments ===
==== Humanities ====
- Assamese Department
- English Department
- Hindi Department
- Philosophy Department

==== Social Science ====
- Anthropology Department
- Economics Department
- Education Department
- History Department
- Home Science Department
- Political Science Department
1. Department of ITEP

==== Natural Science ====
- Botany Department
- Chemistry Department
- Electronics Department
- Geography Department
- Mathematics Department
- Physics Department
- Statistics Department
- Zoology Department

==== Technology ====
- Computer Science Department

==== Physical Education ====
- Physical Education Department

=== Facilities ===
- Library
- Career Counselling
- Training for Competitive Examinations
- Boys Hostels
- New Boys Hostel
- Girls Hostel
- Gymnasium
- Playground with modern Synthetic Track

== Academics ==
The college provides major (honours) courses across a wide array of subjects in both the Arts and Science streams, comprising a total of 19 departments. It caters to approximately 2,500 students in undergraduate programs, 500 in postgraduate programs, and around 200 engaged in research programs.

=== Courses ===
The college offeres the following courses

==== Undergraduate Courses ====
- Bachelor of Science (BSc)
- Bachelor of Arts (BA)
- Bachelor of Computer Application (BCA)
- Bachelor of Physical Education (BPES)
- Integrated Teachers Education Programme (Integrated BA/BSc-BEd)

==== Post Graduate Courses ====
- Integrated Masters of Arts (Integrated MA)
- Integrated Masters of Science (Integrated MSc)
- Masters of Arts (MA)
- Masters of Science (MSc)
- PG Diploma Courses

==== Research Courses ====
- MPhil
- PhD

==== Other Courses ====
- Post Graduate Diploma in Computer Application (PGDCA)
- Post Graduate Diploma in Disaster Management (PGDDM)
- Post Graduate Diploma in Tourism Management (PGDTM)
- Certificate Courses

==== Discontinued Courses ====
Previously, the college offered Higher Secondary Courses in both Science and Arts. However, following government directives, these courses were discontinued in 2021 to allow the institution to concentrate more on higher education programs. The college also offered the courses of Indira Gandhi National Open University and Krishna Kanta Handique State Open University in the respective study centers of the open Universities in the college.
