= Durga Bhumij =

Indian politician

Durga Bhumij is an Indian politician, former lawmaker and member of the Indian National Congress. Bhumij was a member of the Assam Legislative Assembly from the Doom Dooma constituency in Tinsukia district in the 2006 and 2016 elections.
