= Lalit Kumar Doley =

Indian politician

Member of Parliament
- In office 1977–1980
- Constituency: Lakhimpur

Member of Legislative Assembly
- In office 1962–1967
- Constituency: Dhakuakhana

President, Assam Pradesh Congress Committee
- In office N/A–N/A

Personal details
- Born: 25 May 1927
- Died: 16 March 1986 (aged 58)
- Party: Indian National Congress
- Spouse: Smt. Amili Doley
- Children: 7
- Education: Cotton College
- Occupation: Politician

Lalit Kumar Doley (25 May 1927 – 16 March 1986) was an Indian politician and a leader of the Indian National Congress in Assam.

He was the first to be elected as the president of Assam Pradesh Congress Committee among the Mishings in 1972 and again in 1980. He is generally regarded as the most prominent leader of the Mishing community. During his life, his selfless devotion to the people of Assam made him widely popular.

== Personal life ==
His daughter Shakuntala Gamlin is a 1984-batch Arunachal Pradesh-Goa-Mizoram-Union Territories (AGMUT) cadre IAS officer. She retired as Secretary, Dept. of Empowerment of Person With Disabilities, Govt. of India. She also served as Chief Secretary of Arunachal Pradesh. She is the first lady IAS from North East to reach a Secretary level post in central ministry. She is the first female IAS officer from Mishing tribe of Assam. Shakuntala Gamlin was wife of former Arunachal Pradesh Chief Minister, Jarbom Gamlin who is an alumnus of St. Stephen's College, New Delhi.
