= Lakhimpur district =

Coordinates: 27°13′48″N 94°06′00″E

- District of Assam
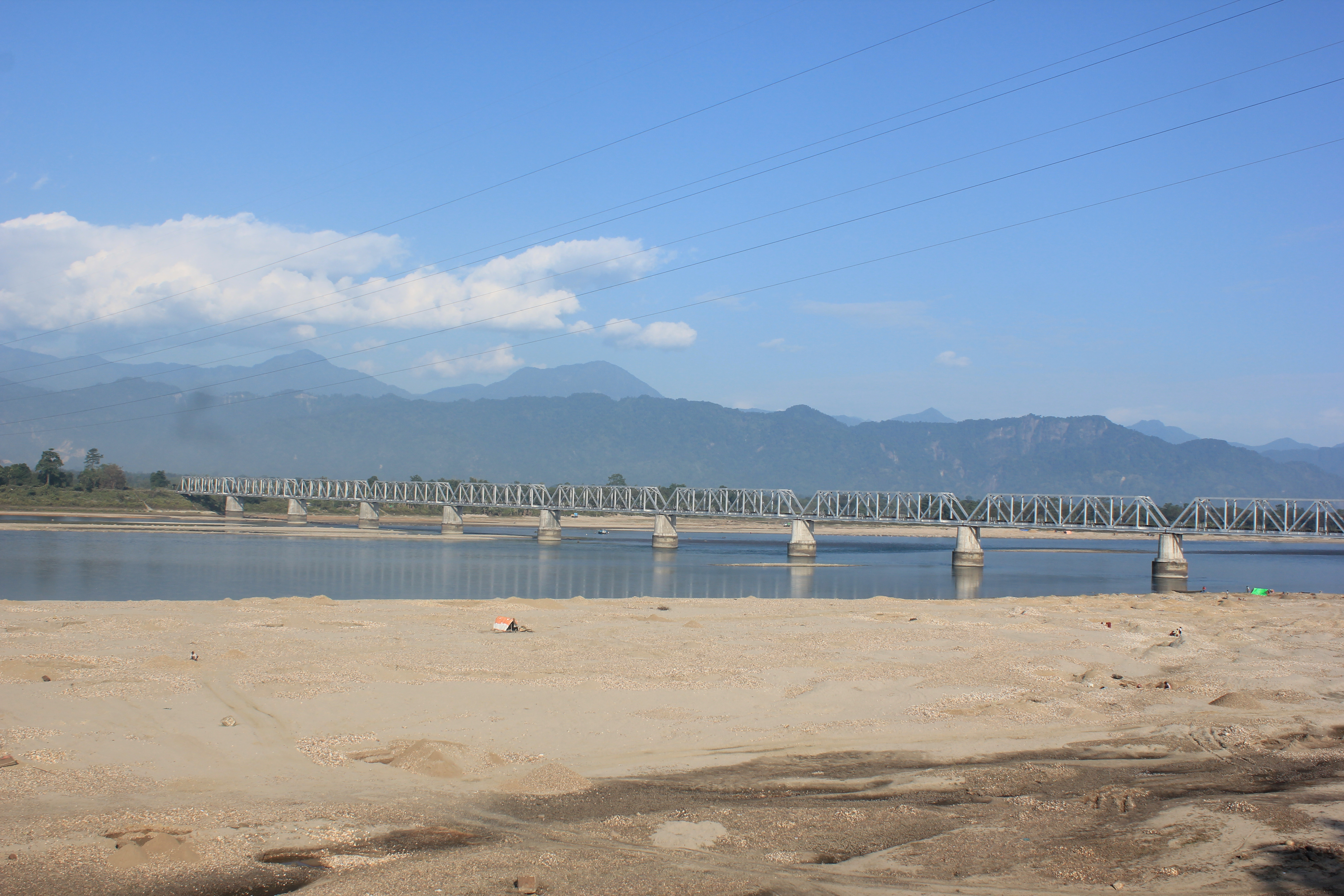
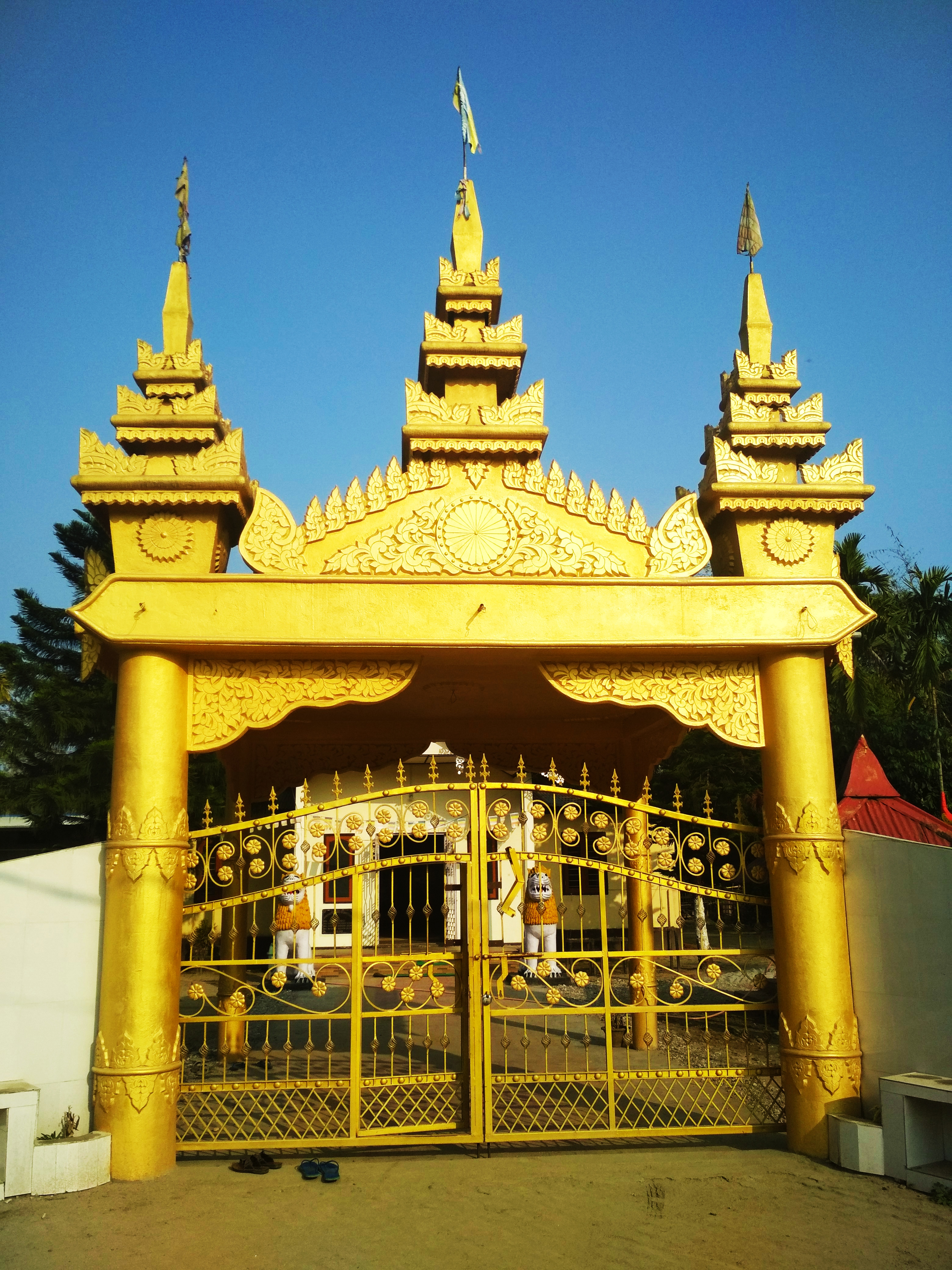
- Clockwise from top-left: Subansiri river in Lakhimpur, Entrance of Buddhist Bapusang at Bor-Khamti Gaon

- Location in Assam
- Country: India
- State: Assam
- Division: Upper Assam
- Headquarters: North Lakhimpur
- Tehsils: 1. North Lakhimpur, 2. Dhakuakhana, 3. Kadam, 4. Naoboicha, 5. Bihpuria, 6. Narayanpur 7. Subansiri (Ghilamara)

Government
  - District Commissioner: Sri Pronab Jit Kakoty, ACS
  - Superintendent of Police: Sri Gunendra Deka, APS
  - Lok Sabha constituencies: Sonitpur, Lakhimpur
  - Vidhan Sabha constituencies: Bihpuria, Rongonadi, Naoboicha, Lakhimpur, Dhakuakhana

Area
  - Total: 2,277 km^{2} (879 sq mi)

Population (2011)
  - Total: 1,042,137
  - Density: 457.7/km^{2} (1,185/sq mi)

Demographics
  - Literacy: 78.39 %
  - Sex ratio: 965 female per 1000 male
- Time zone: UTC+05:30 (IST)
- Major highways: NH-15
- Website: lakhimpur.nic.in

Lakhimpur district (/ˌlækɪmˈpʊər/ LAK-im-POOR) is an administrative district in the state of Assam, India. The district headquarters is located at North Lakhimpur. It is bounded on the north by the Siang and Papumpare districts of Arunachal Pradesh and on the east by the Dhemaji district and the Subansiri River. Majuli District stands on the southern side and Biswanath District is on the western side .

== History ==
Lakhimpur figures largely in the annals of Assam as the region where tribes from the east first reached the Brahmaputra. The most prominent of them was the Chutia rulers who held the areas of the present district for long, until the outbreak of the Ahom-Chutia conflict in the 16th century and eventually the area came under the rule of the Ahom kingdom. There was a Chutia principality formed by the king Lakshminarayan in the start of the 15th century upon which the district has been named. The copperplate inscription of a land grant given by the Chutia king Lakshminarayan in the year 1401 CE in the west of the Subansiri river as well as the ruins between Dhal and Ghagar rivers (near present-day North Lakhimpur town) shows the evidence of the settlement.

The Ahoms, after annexing the Chutia kingdom, created a new position called Bhatialia Gohain to control the region. Later, the Ahom king created twelve regional principalities and settled the Baro-Bhuyans from central Assam there. They ruled as feudal lords as a reward for helping defeat the Kachari kingdom.

The Burmese, who had ruined the native kingdoms, at the end of the 18th century, was in 1826 expelled by the British under the Treaty of Yandabo. They placed the southern part of the state, together with Sivasagar under the rule of Purandar Singha; but it was not until 1838 that the whole was taken under direct British Administration.

Lakhimpur district used to have several other districts of Arunachal Pradesh within its fold and was known as the Lakhimpur Frontier Tract. After independence, the district contained the present day Dibrugarh district, Tinsukia district and Dhemaji district. Its headquarter was at Dibrugarh.

In 1971, Dibrugarh district was separated from Lakhimpur. This was repeated on 14 October 1989, with the formation of Dhemaji district.

== Demographics ==
Historical population
Year	Pop.	±% p.a.
1901	73,409	—
1911	92,708	+2.36%
1921	124,296	+2.98%
1931	154,021	+2.17%
1941	188,977	+2.07%
1951	222,883	+1.66%
1961	335,346	+4.17%
1971	480,838	+3.67%
1991	751,517	+2.26%
2001	889,010	+1.69%
2011	1,042,137	+1.60%

According to the 2011 census Lakhimpur district has a population of 1,042,137, roughly equal to the nation of Cyprus or the US state of Rhode Island. This gives it a ranking of 435th in India (out of a total of 640). The district has a population density of 457 inhabitants per square kilometre (1,180/sq mi) . Its population growth rate over the decade 2001-2011 was 17.06%. Lakhimpur has a sex ratio of 965 females for every 1000 males, and a literacy rate of 78.39%. 8.77% of the population lives in urban areas. Scheduled Castes and Tribes make up 7.85% and 23.93% of the population respectively.

=== Religion ===
Religions in Lakhimpur district (2011)
Religion	Percent
Hinduism	76.49%
Islam	18.57%
Christianity	4.43%
Other or not stated	0.51%

Hindus are 76.49%, Muslims are 18.57% and Christians are 4.43% of the population.

=== Languages ===
Languages of Lakhimpur district (2011)
1. Assamese (57.8%)
2. Mising (17.6%)
3. Bengali (13.0%)
4. Sadri (2.46%)
5. Nepali (2.35%)
6. Deori (1.21%)
7. Hindi (1.17%)
8. Others (4.41%)

At the time of the 2011 census, 57.8% of the population spoke Assamese, 17.64% Mishing, 12.96% Bengali, 2.46% Sadri, 2.35% Nepali, 1.21% Deori and 1.17% Hindi as their first language.

== Divisions ==
There are four Assam Legislative Assembly constituencies in this district: Bihpuria, Naoboicha, Lakhimpur, and Dhakuakhana. Dhakuakhana is designated for Scheduled Tribes. Bihpuria is in the Tezpur Lok Sabha constituency, while the other three are in the Lakhimpur Lok Sabha constituency.

== Economy ==
The economy of Lakhimpur is mainly based on agriculture. Lakhimpur was the first district into which tea cultivation was introduced by the government, and the Assam Company began operations here in 1840. Major crops are rice, tea, mustard, sugarcane, etc. A small number of SSc and MSc industries are located in the district.

== Etymology ==
The name Lakhimpur was derived from the name "Lakshmipur" which was given by the Sutiya king named Lakshminarayan who ruled during the 15th century. Later, it was changed by the Baro-Bhuyans to Lakhimpur, when they were made feudal lords of the region by the Ahoms after defeating the Sutiya kings and was kept in memory of the land (in present-day Darrang district), which they lost to the Koch kingdom.

== Flora and fauna ==
In the year 1996 Lakhimpur district became home to the Bardoibum-Beelmukh Wildlife Sanctuary, which has an area of 11 km^{2} (4.2 mi^{2}). It shares the park with Dhemaji district.

== Geography ==
Lakhimpur district occupies an area of 2,277 square kilometres (879 sq mi), comparatively equivalent to Indonesia's Yapen Island.

Located in the North-East corner of the Indian State of Assam, the district of Lakhimpur lies on the North bank of the river Brahmaputra. It is bounded on the North by Lower Subansiri and Papumpare Districts of the state of Arunachal Pradesh and on the East by Dhemaji District. Majuli, the largest river-island district is on the South and Biswanath District is on the West. The Brahmaputra is navigable for steamers in all seasons as far as Dibrugarh, in the rainy season as far as Sadiya; its navigable tributaries within the district are the Subansiri River, Ranganadi, and Dikrong River. The exact location of the district is 26.48' and 27.53' Northern latitude and 93.42' and 94.20' East longitude (approx.).

The district has three sub divisions -- Dhakuakhana, Narayanpur-Bihpuria and North Lakhimpur (sadar). Lakhimpur district has eight Police stations. viz. North Lakhimpur, Boginadi, Panigaon, Dhakuakhana, Ghilamara, Narayanpur, Laluk and Bihpuria.

Forests are mainly tropical rain forest. Important reserved forests includes Ranga Reserve, Kakoi Reserve, Dulung Reserve and Pabho Reserve. Some varieties are Hollokh (Terminalia myriocarpa), Ajhar (Lagerstroemia speciosa), Simolu (Bombax ceiba or Salmalia malabarica), Sum (Machilus), Gomari (Gmelina arborea), Sisu (Dalbergia sissoo), Silikha (Terminalia chebula), Neem (Azadirachta indica), Nahar (Mesua ferrea) etc. Wild elephants, buffaloes, tigers, deer etc. are there in the forests. Varieties of bird species are observed in swampy areas.

The great Subansiri River has legends of once famous gold washing. But as of now, there is no any major exploration of minerals in the district, except some minor exploration for petroleum by the Oil and Natural Gas Corporation (ONGC) near Dhakuakhana.

== See also ==
- Lakhimpur (Lok Sabha constituency)
- Latabari
