= Barpeta Lok Sabha constituency =

Lok Sabha constituency in Assam

Coordinates: 26.32°N 91.00°E

Barpeta AS-3
- Lok Sabha constituency
- Interactive Map Outlining Barpeta Lok Sabha constituency

Constituency details
- Country: India
- Region: Northeast India
- State: Assam
- Assembly constituencies: Abhayapuri; Bongaigaon; Bhowanipur–Sorbhog; Barpeta; Pakabetbari; Bajali; Hajo–Sualkuchi; Barkhetri; Nalbari; Tihu
- Established: 1952
- Total electors: 19,66,956 (as of 2024)
- Reservation: None

Member of Parliament
- 18th Lok Sabha
- Incumbent Phani Bhusan Choudhury
- Party: AGP
- Alliance: NDA
- Elected year: 2024

Barpeta Lok Sabha constituency is one of 14 Lok Sabha constituencies in Assam, a state in north-eastern India.

== Assembly segments ==
Barpeta Lok Sabha constituency is composed of the following assembly segments:

=== Current assembly segments ===
Constituency number	Name	District	Members	Party	2024 Lead
16	Abhayapuri	Bongaigaon	Bhupen Roy	BJP	AGP
18	Bongaigaon	Bongaigaon	Diptimayee Choudhury	AGP	AGP
21	Bhowanipur–Sorbhog	Barpeta	Ranjeet Kumar Dass	BJP	AGP
24	Barpeta (SC)	Barpeta	Kumar Deepak Das	AGP	AGP
25	Pakabetbari	Barpeta	Jakir Hussain Sikdar	INC	INC
26	Bajali	Barpeta	Dharmeshwar Roy	AGP	AGP
30	Hajo–Sualkuchi (SC)	Kamrup	Prakash Chandra Das	AGP	AGP
38	Barkhetri	Nalbari	Narayan Deka	BJP	AGP
39	Nalbari	Nalbari	Jayanta Malla Baruah	BJP	AGP
40	Tihu	Nalbari	Chandra Mohan Patowary	BJP	AGP

=== Previous assembly segments ===
Constituency number	Name	District
32	Bongaigaon	Bongaigaon
34	Abhayapuri North	Bongaigaon
35	Abhayapuri South (SC)	Bongaigaon
42	Patacharkuchi	Barpeta
43	Barpeta	Barpeta
44	Jania	Barpeta
45	Baghbar	Barpeta
46	Sarukhetri	Barpeta
47	Chenga	Barpeta
61	Dharmapur	Nalbari

== Members of Parliament ==
Election	Lok Sabha	Name	Party
Barpeta Lok Sabha Constituency (1952-1957)
1952	1st	Beli Ram Das	Indian National Congress
Goalpara Lok Sabha Constituency (1957-1962)
1957	2nd	Rani Manjula Devi	Indian National Congress
Barpeta Lok Sabha Constituency (1962 till date)
1962	3rd	Renuka Devi Barkataki	Indian National Congress
1967	4th	Fakhruddin Ali Ahmed	Indian National Congress
1971	5th	Fakhruddin Ali Ahmed	Indian National Congress
1977	6th	Ismail Hossain Khan	Indian National Congress
1980	7th	Elections not held in Assam	N/A
1984	8th	Ataur Rahman	Asom Gana Parishad
1989	9th	Elections not held in Assam	N/A
1991	10th	Uddhab Barman	Communist Party of India (Marxist)
1996	11th	Uddhab Barman	Communist Party of India (Marxist)
1998	12th	A.F. Golam Osmani	Indian National Congress
1999	13th	A.F. Golam Osmani	Indian National Congress
2004	14th	A.F. Golam Osmani	Indian National Congress
2009	15th	Ismail Hussain	Indian National Congress
2014	16th	Sirajuddin Ajmal	All India United Democratic Front
2019	17th	Abdul Khaleque	Indian National Congress
2024	18th	Phani Bhusan Choudhury	Asom Gana Parishad

== Election results ==
=== General election 2024 ===
2024 Indian general election: Barpeta
Party	Candidate	Votes	%	±%
AGP	Phani Bhusan Choudhury	860,113	51.02	▲16.41
INC	Deep Bayan	637,762	37.83	▼6.40
CPI(M)	Manoranjan Talukdar	96,138	5.70	N/A
NOTA	None of the above	17,117	1.02	▲0.35
Majority		222,351	13.19	▲3.57
Turnout		1,690,051	85.40	▼1.17
AGP gain from INC		Swing	▲6.79	

=== 2019 ===
2019 Indian general election: Barpeta
Party	Candidate	Votes	%	±%
INC	Abdul Khaleque	645,173	44.23	+21.21
AGP	Kumar Deepak Das	504,866	34.61	+28.50
AIUDF	Rafiqul Islam	248,667	17.05	−15.65
AITC	Ashahak Ali Dewan	20,466	1.40	+0.49
NOTA	None of the above	9,734	0.67	+0.27
Majority		140,307	9.62	+6.11
Turnout		1,458,808	86.57	+2.17
Registered electors		1,685,149		
INC gain from AIUDF		Swing	+11.53	

=== 2014 ===
2014 Indian general elections: Barpeta
Party	Candidate	Votes	%	±%
AIUDF	Sirajuddin Ajmal	394,702	32.70	+8.72
BJP	Chandra Mohan Patowary	352,361	29.19	+29.19
INC	Ismail Hussain	277,802	23.02	−12.73
AGP	Phani Bhusan Choudhury	73,733	6.11	−26.26
CPI(M)	Uddhab Barman	27,575	2.28	−1.72
Independent	Samsul Hoque	24,444	2.03	+2.03
Independent	Dilir Khan	20,135	1.67	+1.67
AITC	Dr. Parvez Ali Ahmed	10,944	0.91	+0.91
SUCI(C)	Khurshida Anowara Begum	5,710	0.47	+0.47
Independent	Kamal Uddin	3,433	0.28	+0.28
SP	Abul Awal	3,099	0.26	−0.02
Lok Bharati	Entaz Ali	1,937	0.16	+0.16
Independent	Gautam Kumar Sarma	1,859	0.15	+0.15
Independent	Bhadreswar Barman	1,695	0.14	+0.14
Independent	Barun Karmakar	1,649	0.14	+0.14
NOTA	None of the above	4,785	0.40	−−−
Majority		42,341	3.51	+0.13
Turnout		1,207,044	84.40	
AIUDF gain from INC		Swing	+10.73	

== See also ==
- Barpeta district
- List of constituencies of the Lok Sabha
