= Abhayapuri Assembly constituency =

Assembly constituency of Assam

Abhayapuri
- Constituency No. 16 for the Assam Legislative Assembly

Constituency details
- Country: India
- Region: Northeast India
- State: Assam
- District: Bongaigaon
- Lok Sabha constituency: Barpeta
- Established: 2023
- Reservation: None

Member of Legislative Assembly
- 16th Assam Legislative Assembly
- Incumbent Bhupen Roy
- Party: Bharatiya Janata Party
- Alliance: National Democratic Alliance
- Elected year: 2026

Abhayapuri Assembly constituency is one of the 126 assembly constituencies of Assam, a northeastern state in India. The constituency is part of the Barpeta Lok Sabha constituency. It was newly formed in 2023, after the merger of the Abhayapuri North and Abhayapuri South Assembly constituencies.

== Election Results ==
=== 2026 ===
2026 Assam Legislative Assembly election: Abhayapuri
| Party | Candidate | Votes | % | ±% |
|---|---|---|---|---|
| BJP | Bhupen Roy | 111,154 | 66.22 | |
| INC | Pradip Sarkar | 52,228 | 31.12 | |
| AITC | Koushik Ranjan Das | 1,497 | 0.89 | |
| NOTA | NOTA | 1,995 | 1.19 | |
| Margin of victory | | 58,926 | 35.10 | |
| Turnout | | 167,851 | 90.8 | |
| Registered electors | | | | |

== See also ==
- Abhayapuri
- List of constituencies of Assam Legislative Assembly
