= Jania =

Jania may refer to:

- Jania (given name), a female given name, also spelled Janiya
- Jania (alga), J.V.Lamouroux, 1812, a coralline algae genus
- Jania Schult. & Schult.f., 1830, a plant genus, now considered a synonym of Moraea
- Jania, a 1996 album by Pakistani singer Ali Haider
- Jania, Barpeta district, a Satra holding village of Barpeta District, Assam, India
- Jania (Vidhan Sabha constituency), an assembly constituency of Assam Legislative Assembly in India
- Al-Janiya, Palestinian village on the occupied West Bank
