= Ismail Hussain =

Indian politician

- ইছমাইল হুছেইন
- Lok Sabha portrait

Member of Parliament, Lok Sabha
- In office 16 May 2009 – 16 May 2014
- Preceded by: A. F. Golam Osmani
- Succeeded by: Sirajuddin Ajmal
- Constituency: Barpeta

Cabinet Minister, Assam
- In office 17 May 2001 – 21 May 2006
- Chief Minister: Tarun Gogoi
- Departments: Soil Conservation; Irrigation (2001–02, 2004–06); Char Areas Development, Minority Welfare, Wakf Board and Haj Affairs, Industries and Commerce, Public Enterprises (2001–02); Flood Control (2004–06)
- Preceded by: Abdul Muhib Mazumder (Irrigation); Gunin Hazarika (Industries); Nurjamal Sarkar (Flood Control)
- Succeeded by: Nurjamal Sarkar (Soil, Irrigation, Flood Control); Wazed Ali Choudhury (Char Areas, Minority); Bhubaneswar Kalita (Industries, Public Enterprises)

Minister of State, Assam
- In office 30 June 1991 – 10 March 1993
- Chief Minister: Hiteswar Saikia
- Departments: Agriculture

Member, Assam Legislative Assembly
- In office 1991–2006
- Preceded by: Kumar Deepak Das
- Succeeded by: Gunindra Nath Das
- Constituency: Barpeta

Personal details
- Born: 1 April 1950 Sukmanah, District. Barpeta, Assam
- Died: 24 April 2015 (aged 65)
- Party: Indian National Congress
- Spouse: Selina Begum
- Children: 4

Ismail Hussain (1 April 1950 – 24 April 2015) was an Indian politician who was a member of the Indian Parliament representing the Barpeta Lok Sbha constituency for the Indian National Congress.
