= Bhupen Roy =

Indian politician (born 1964)

Bhupen Roy (born 1964) is an Indian politician from the northeastern state of Assam. He is a five time member of the Assam Legislative Assembly. In 2026, he won the Abhayapuri Assembly constituency in Bongaigaon district, representing the Bharatiya Janata Party. Earlier, he represented the Asom Gana Parishad four times from the Abhayapuri North abhayapuri Assembly constituency in 1991, 1996, 2001 and 2011.

== Early life and education ==
Roy is from Abhayapuri, Bongaigaon district, Assam. He is the son of late Dwijen Roy. He completed his Pre-University course in 1983, and BA in 1988, both at Abhayapuri College, which is affiliated with Gauhati University. He was also the General Secretary of the Abhayapuri college students’ union for 3 consecutive terms. He was also associated to All Assam Students’ Union and was a very strong and prominent leader of the region during the Assam movement and also served as the Organising Secretary of the All Goalpara District Students’ Union (Undivided Goalpara district). He is a cultivator and tea planter. He declared assets worth Rs.2 crore in his affidavit to the Election Commission of India.

== Career ==
Roy won the Abhayapuri Assembly constituency representing the Bharatiya Janata Party in the 2026 Assam Legislative Assembly election. He polled 1,11,154 votes and defeated his nearest rival, Pradip Sarkar of the Indian National Congress, by a margin of 58,926 votes.

Roy contested the 1985 Assam Legislative Assembly election on AGP ticket for the first time but lost in a very small margin. He became an MLA for the first time winning the Abhayapuri North Assembly constituency representing the Asom Gana Parishad in the 1991 Assam Legislative Assembly election and retained the seat for AGP in the 1996 and 2001 Assembly elections. He was also the Chairman of the Marketing board of the Government of Assam from 1996 to 2001. He lost the 2006 election to Abdul Hai Nagori of the Indian National Congress but regained it for AGP again in 2011. He lost the 2016 and 2021 election, on AGP ticket because of the previous demographic population of Abhayapuri North. Later, he moved to BJP and won the 2026 election.
