= Abdul Khaleque (Assam politician) =

Indian politician, Former Member of Parliament from Barpeta constituency

Member of Parliament, Lok Sabha
- In office 23 May 2019 – 4 June 2024
- Preceded by: Sirajuddin Ajmal
- Succeeded by: Phani Bhusan Choudhury
- Constituency: Barpeta, Assam

Member of the Assam Legislative Assembly
- In office 19 May 2016 – 23 May 2019
- Preceded by: Dr. Rafiqul Islam
- Succeeded by: Dr. Rafiqul Islam
- Constituency: Jania
- In office 11 May 2006 – 13 May 2011
- Preceded by: Asahaque Ali
- Succeeded by: Dr. Rafiqul Islam
- Constituency: Jania

Personal details
- Born: 1 February 1971 (age 55) Barbhitha, Assam, India
- Party: Indian National Congress
- Spouse: Kamlani Khaleque (2011-present)
- Children: 1 daughter 1 son
- Parent(s): Sohrab Ali (Father); Sabura Khatun(Mother)
- Education: Gauhati University; Vinayaka Mission's Research Foundation
- Alma mater: Bongaigaon College
- Profession: Journalist, Writer, Politician
- As of 16 September, 2017 Source: [official sites]

Abdul Khaleque (born 1 February 1971) is an Indian politician, journalist and writer from Assam belonging to Indian National Congress who served as the Member of Parliament, Lok Sabha representing Barpeta constituency from 2019 till 2024. Previously, he served as a Member of the Assam Legislative Assembly from Jania Constituency from 2016 to 2019 and again from 2006 to 2011.

== Career ==
He has been elected to that legislative body twice: First in 2006 from the 44 no Jania, Barpeta district, and again from the same constituency in 2016. Khaleque is a member of the Indian National Congress.

Khaleque has proposed that the government provincialize all venture schools, condemned government drives to evict landless people from government land, and opposed the proposed dissolution of the Assam Chah Mazdoor Sangha.

== Education ==
Abdul Khaleque had completed his primary education from Bartary LP school and Langla High School. He graduated from Bongaigaon College and then completed his masters in Assamese literature from Gauhati University. He also did an MA in International Relations.

== Social and literacy works ==
He is an education promoter as well as writer. His recent works are published in various books as well as his own books.

== Personal life ==
Khaleque had completed primary education at Bartary village under Barbhitha GP and later completed his graduation and PG from Bongaigaon college under Gauhati University. He has married Kamlani Khaleque and the couple has 2 children.
