= Phani Bhusan Choudhury =

Indian politician

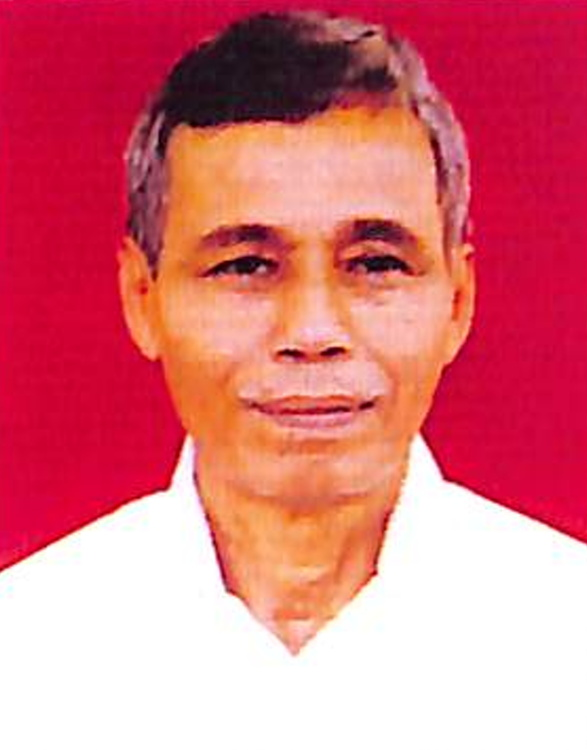

Member of Parliament, Lok Sabha
- Incumbent
- Assumed office 4 June 2024
- Preceded by: Abdul Khaleque
- Constituency: Barpeta

Cabinet Minister, Assam
- In office 26 April 2018 – 10 May 2021
- Chief Minister: Sarbananda Sonowal
- Departments: Food, Civil Supplies and Consumer Affairs; Pension and Public Grievances
- Preceded by: Rihon Daimary (FCS&CA); Himanta Biswa Sarma (P&PG)
- Succeeded by: Ranjeet Kumar Dass (FCS&CA)

Member, Assam Legislative Assembly
- In office 1983 – 9 June 2024
- Preceded by: Mathura Mohan Sinha
- Succeeded by: Diptimayee Choudhury
- Constituency: Bongaigaon

Personal details
- Born: 1 May 1952 (age 74) Bakharapara, Bongaigaon, Assam
- Party: Asom Gana Parishad
- Spouse: Diptimayee Choudhury
- Children: 1
- Parent: Ramesh Choudhury (Father)

Phani Bhusan Choudhury (born 1 May 1952) is an Indian politician from Assam, India. He is currently serving as Member of Parliament, Lok Sabha representing Barpeta Lok Sabha constituency as a member of Asom Gana Parishad. He has a distinct record of representing Bongaigaon constituency for the 8th consecutive time in the Assam Legislative Assembly since 1985. He was the Minister of Food and Civil Supplies and Consumer Affairs, Pension and Public Grievance, Government of Assam from 2018 to 2021 in the Sarbananda Sonowal ministry. Phani was the member of the Housing Committee of Assam Legislative Assembly, Member, Public Undertakings committee of Assam Legislative Assembly Minister from 1996 to 2001. He was also Chairman of Public Accounts Committee from 2009 to 2011 and leader of AGP legislature Party from 2011 to 2016. Choudhury is a leader of the regional outfit Asom Gana Parishad. He was also elected as Pro tem Speaker of Assam Legislative Assembly in 2021.

== Electoral records ==
Outcome	Year	Party	Constituency Name	Votes
Won	1983	Independent	Bongaigaon	
Won	1985	Independent	Bongaigaon	
Won	1991	Asom Gana Parishad	Bongaigaon	
Won	1996	Asom Gana Parishad	Bongaigaon	
Won	2001	Asom Gana Parishad	Bongaigaon	
Won	2006	Asom Gana Parishad	Bongaigaon	
Won	2011	Asom Gana Parishad	Bongaigaon	
Lost	2014	Asom Gana Parishad	Barpeta	73,733
Won	2016	Asom Gana Parishad	Bongaigaon	77,292
Won	2021	Asom Gana Parishad	Bongaigaon	82,800
Won	2024	Asom Gana Parishad	Barpeta	8,60,113
