= Janiya =

Janiya or Jania is an uncommon female given name of Hebrew origin and meaning from Jana. The name may be Arabic, and could possible be related to name Jana, Jane, Janie. Names that sound similar are Tania and Taniya.

People so named include:

- Jania Aubakirova, Kazakhstani pianist

== See also ==
- Jania (disambiguation), a number of villages in Poland
