= Manikpur =

Manikpur is an Indian place name, and may refer to:

- Manikpur, Assam, a town, a block, and a subdivision in Bongaigaon district
- Manikpur, Muzaffarpur, also known as Manikpur Darbar, a village in Muzaffarpur district, Bihar
- Manikpur, Chitrakoot, a town and a nagar panchayat and tehsil in Chitrakoot district, Uttar Pradesh
- Manikpur Assembly constituency, a constituency of the Uttar Pradesh Legislative Assembly covering the city of Manikpur in Chitrakoot district
- Manikpur, Pratapgarh, a town and a nagar panchayat in Pratapgarh district, Uttar Pradesh
- Manikpur, West Bengal, a town in Howrah district
- Kara-Manikpur, a subah (province) in medieval India
