= Doloni Bill =

Doloni Bill (also spelled as Doloni Beel) is a village in the Balapara panchayat of the Bongaigaon district in Assam, India.
