= Abdul Hai Nagori =

Indian politician

Member of Assam Legislative Assembly
- In office 2016–2021
- Preceded by: Bhupen Ray
- Succeeded by: Abdul Batin Khandakar
- Constituency: Abhayapuri North
- In office 2006–2011
- Preceded by: Bhupen Ray
- Succeeded by: Bhupen Ray
- Constituency: Abhayapuri North

Personal details
- Party: Indian National Congress

Abdul Hai Nagori is an Indian politician. He was elected to the Assam Legislative Assembly from Abhayapuri North in the 2006 and 2016 elections as a member of the Indian National Congress.
