= Bagheswari Temple, Bongaigaon =

Bagheswari Temple
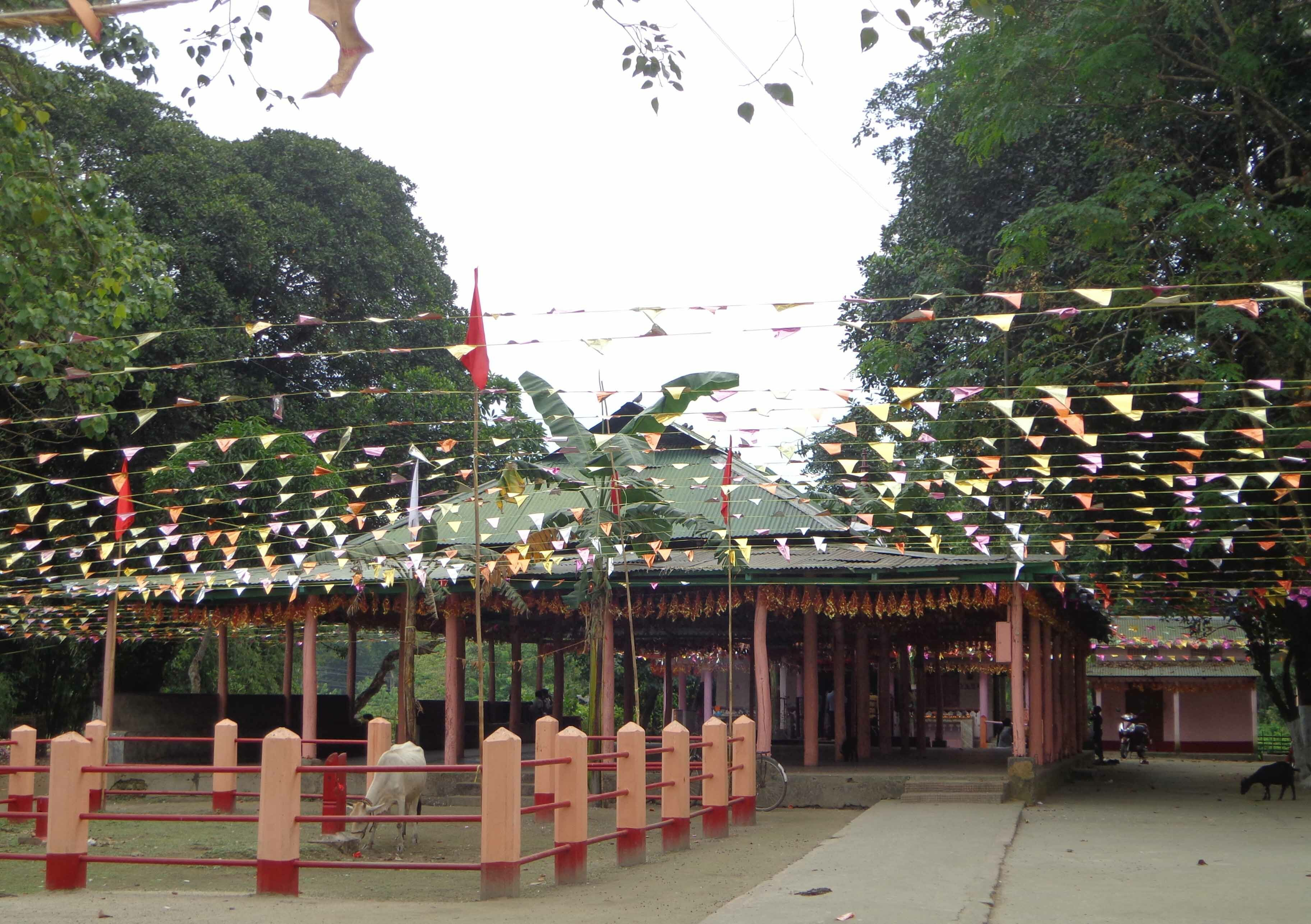
- Bagheswari Temple

Religion
- Affiliation: Hinduism
- District: Bongaigaon

Location
- Location: Borpara, Bongaigaon
- State: Assam
- Country: India
- Interactive map of Bagheswari Temple
- Coordinates: 26.469315°N 91.564266°E

Architecture
- Creator: Various

Specifications
- Temple: 2
- Monument: 1

The Bagheswari Temple is a Hindu temple dedicated to the mother goddess Bagheswari, one of the oldest of the 51 Shakti Pitha. Situated in southern part of Bongaigaon city in Assam, India. It is an important pilgrimage destination for general Hindu. Here exists a rock-cut Ganesha of the mediaeval period, along with architectural components of a stone temple datable to 10th -11th CE

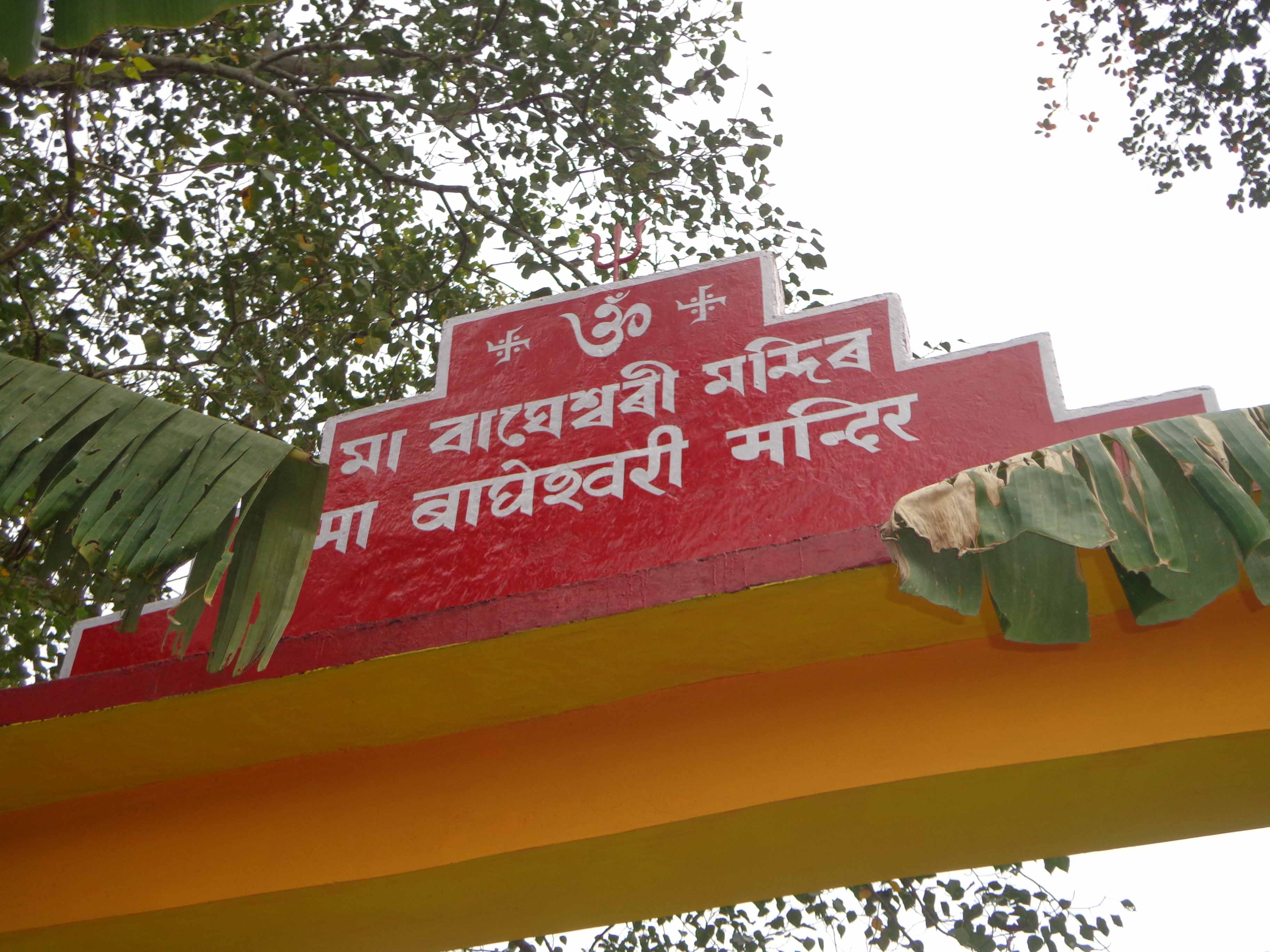
Gate of Bagheswari Mandir, Bongaigaon, Assam, IN
