= Abdur Rahim Khan (disambiguation) =

Abdur Rahim Khan may refer to:

- Abdur Rahim Khan (1925–1990), Pakistani air officer
- Abdur Rahim Khan (politician) (born 1966), Indian politician
- Abdur Rahim Khan (governor) (1886–?), Afghan governor
