= Bajali Assembly constituency =

Assembly constituency of Assam

Bajali
- Constituency No. 26 for the Assam Legislative Assembly

Constituency details
- Country: India
- Region: Northeast India
- State: Assam
- Division: Lower Assam
- District: Bajali
- Lok Sabha constituency: Barpeta
- Established: 2023
- Reservation: None

Member of Legislative Assembly
- 16th Assam Legislative Assembly
- Incumbent Dharmeswar Roy
- Party: AGP
- Alliance: NDA
- Elected year: 2026

Bajali Assembly constituency is one of the 126 assembly constituencies of the Assam Legislative Assembly in India. This constituency forms part of Barpeta Lok Sabha constituency. It was newly formed in 2023.

== Election Results ==
=== 2026 ===
2026 Assam Legislative Assembly election: Bajali
| Party | Candidate | Votes | % | ±% |
|---|---|---|---|---|
| AGP | Dharmeswar Roy | 80130 | 56.04 | |
| AJP | Dilip Baruah | 55684 | 38.94 | |
| AITC | Kalyani Kalita | 3617 | 2.53 | |
| NOTA | NOTA | 3566 | 2.49 | |
| Margin of victory | | 24446 | | |
| Turnout | | 142997 | | |
| Rejected ballots | | | | |
| Registered electors | | | | |
| gain from | | Swing | | |
