= Barbhitha =

Barbhitha is a village located in Kalgachia Circle of Barpeta district, Assam with total 548 families residing. The Barbhitha village has population of 3391 of which 1716 are males while 1675 are females as per Population Census 2011.

== Educational ==
Barbhitha village has lower literacy rate compared to Assam. In 2011, the literacy rate of Barbhitha village was 57.56% compared to 72.19% of Assam. In Barbhitha Male literacy stands at 62.48% while female literacy rate was 52.46%.Barbhitha High School is situated at the heart of the village along with 10+ lower and upper primary schools.

As per constitution of India and Panchyati Raaj Act, Barbhitha village is administrated by Sarpanch (Head of Village) who is the elected representative of the village and a Gaonbura also is appointed by Government of Assam.
