= Hajo–Sualkuchi Assembly constituency =

Constituency of the Assam legislative assembly in India

Coordinates: 26.25°N 91.55°E

Hajo–Sualkuchi
- Constituency No. 30 for the Assam Legislative Assembly

Constituency details
- Country: India
- Region: Northeast India
- State: Assam
- District: Kamrup
- Lok Sabha constituency: Barpeta
- Established: 1951
- Reservation: SC

Member of Legislative Assembly
- 16th Assam Legislative Assembly
- Incumbent Prakash Chandra Das
- Party: AGP
- Alliance: NDA
- Elected year: 2026

Hajo Assembly constituency is one of the 126 assembly constituencies of Assam a north east state of India. This constituency was renamed to Hajo–Sualkuchi in 2023.

Hajo was also part of Guwahati Lok Sabha constituency till 2023 Delimitation.

Hajo Assembly constituency as per 1976 Delimitation (1976–2023)

== Members of Legislative Assembly ==
Year	Con. No.	Res.	Member	Party
As Hajo Assembly constituency
1952	51	None	Bishnuram Medhi	Indian National Congress
1957	52	None	Bishnuram Medhi	Indian National Congress
1958^	52	None	Mahendra Mohan Choudhury	Indian National Congress
1962	47	None	Mahendra Mohan Choudhury	Indian National Congress
1967	61	None	Bishnuram Medhi	Indian National Congress
1972	61	None	Ranuka Debi Barkataki	Independent
1978	55	None	Rabindra Nath Malakar	Janata Party
1983	55	None	Barkat Ullah	Indian National Congress
1985	55	None	Kamakhya Charan Choudhury	Independent
1991	55	None	Badan Baruah	Natun Asom Gana Parishad
1996	55	None	Nurul Hussain	Asom Gana Parishad
2001	55	None	Haren Das	Indian National Congress
2006	55	None	Nurul Hussain	Asom Gana Parishad
2011	55	None	Dwipen Pathak	All India Trinamool Congress
2016	55	None	Suman Haripriya	Bharatiya Janata Party
2021	55	None	Suman Haripriya	Bharatiya Janata Party
As Hajo–Sualkuchi Assembly constituency
2026	30	SC	Prakash Chandra Das	Asom Gana Parishad

== Election results ==
=== 2026 ===
2026 Assam Legislative Assembly election: Hajo–Sualkuchi
Party	Candidate	Votes	%	±%
AGP	Prakash Chandra Das	81,699	47.84	+7.08
INC	Nandita Das	80,975	47.41	+13.24
NOTA	NOTA	2,390	1.4	+0.57
Margin of victory		724	0.43	
Turnout		1,70,786		
BJP hold		Swing		

=== 2016 ===
2016 Assam Legislative Assembly election: Hajo
Party	Candidate	Votes	%	±%
BJP	Suman Haripriya	55,096	40.76	+29.61
INC	Dulu Ahmed	46,188	34.17	+8.57
AGP	Nurul Hussain	16,602	12.28	−7.24
AITC	Dwipen Pathak	6,673	4.93	−25.84
AIUDF	Mujibur Rahman	3,567	2.63	+0.66
Independent	Hemanta Kalita	1,380	1.02	N/A
Independent	Ramani Malakar	1,017	0.75	N/A
NPP	Imdadur Rahman	696	0.51	N/A
Independent	Ramen Chandra Lahkar	556	0.41	N/A
Independent	Tripti Kana Mazumdar Choudhury	501	0.37	N/A
Independent	Taher Ali Talukdar	369	0.27	N/A
SP	Md. Rekibuddin Ahmad	338	0.25	N/A
RPP	Makani Barman	301	0.22	N/A
LDP	Mohan Chandra Malakar	261	0.19	N/A
RSC	Tabibar Rahman	240	0.17	N/A
Independent	Taizuddin Ahmad	214	0.15	N/A
NOTA	None of the above	1,163	0.86	N/A
Majority		8,908	6.59	+1.42
Turnout		1,35,161	87.54	+9.07
Registered electors		1,54,394		
BJP gain from AITC		Swing	+27.73	

=== 2011 ===
2011 Assam Legislative Assembly election: Hajo
Party	Candidate	Votes	%	±%
AITC	Dwipen Pathak	33,331	30.77	N/A
INC	Kirip Chaliha	27,731	25.60	−1.47
AGP	Nurul Hussain	21,140	19.52	−15.73
BJP	Pranjal Bharali	12,075	11.15	+7.42
Independent	Nur Mohammad	10,360	9.56	N/A
AIUDF	Ramen Chandra Lahkar	2,134	1.97	N/A
Independent	Jagesh Das	1,070	0.99	N/A
Independent	Pranab Jyoti Bharali	471	0.43	N/A
Majority		5,600	5.17	−3.01
Turnout		1,08,312	78.47	−1.62
AITC gain from AGP		Swing		

=== 2006 ===
2006 Assam Legislative Assembly election: Hajo
Party	Candidate	Votes	%	±%
AGP	Nurul Hussain	38,917	35.25	
INC	Haren Das	29,885	27.07	
NCP	Barkatullah	19,836	17.97	
Independent	Dwipen Pathak	11,674	10.57	
BJP	Dhruba Prasad Baishya	4,113	3.73	
CPI(M)	Abul Hussain	3,443	3.12	
NBNP	Surajit Hazarika	869	0.79	
Independent	Jiban Das	633	0.57	
RPI	Bhupen Chandra Mudol	587	0.53	
AGP(P)	Hari Chandra Das	444	0.40	
Majority		9,032	8.18	
Turnout		1,10,401	80.09	
AGP gain from INC		Swing		

== See also ==
- Kamrup district
- List of constituencies of Assam Legislative Assembly
