= Abdur Rouf (Indian politician) =

Indian politician

Assam Legislative Assembly
- In office 1996–2001
- Preceded by: Asahaque Ali
- Succeeded by: Asahaque Ali
- Constituency: Jania

Personal details
- Party: All India United Democratic Front

Abdur Rouf is an Indian politician belonging to All India United Democratic Front. He was elected as a member of the Assam Legislative Assembly for Janiya as a United Minorities Front candidate in 1996. He joined Indian National Congress in 2008 and remained with the party for a decade, until 6 September 2019. He joined All India United Democratic Front on 7 October 2019.
