= Abhayapuri North Assembly constituency =

Constituency of the Assam legislative assembly in India

Coordinates: 26.34°N 90.66°E

Abhayapuri North
- Former constituency No. 34 for the Assam Legislative Assembly

Constituency details
- Country: India
- Region: Northeast India
- State: Assam
- District: Bongaigaon
- Lok Sabha constituency: Barpeta
- Established: 1951
- Abolished: 2023
- Reservation: None

Abhayapuri North Assembly constituency was one of the 126 constituencies of the Legislative Assembly of Assam state in northeastern India. This constituency was abolished in 2023.

Abhayapuri North (constituency number 34) was one of the 4 constituencies located in Bongaigaon district.

Abhayapuri North was part of Barpeta Lok Sabha constituency along with 9 other assembly segments, namely, Bongaigaon and Abhayapuri South in this district, Patacharkuchi, Barpeta, Jania, Baghbar, Sarukhetri and Chenga in Barpeta district and Dharmapur in Nalbari district.

== Members of the Legislative Assembly ==
- 1978: Pani Medhi, Independent.
- 1985: Mokbul Hussain, Independent.
- 1991: Bhupen Roy, Asom Gana Parishad.
- 1996: Bhupen Roy, Asom Gana Parishad.
- 2001: Bhupen Roy, Asom Gana Parishad.
- 2006: Abdul Hai Nagori, Indian National Congress.
- 2011: Bhupen Roy, Asom Gana Parishad.
- 2016: Abdul Hai Nagori, Indian National Congress.

Year	Member	Party
2021	Abdul Batin Khandakar	Indian National Congress

== Election results ==
=== 2016 ===
2016 Assam Legislative Assembly election: Abhayapuri North
Party	Candidate	Votes	%	±%
INC	Abdul Hai Nagori	48,354	35.36	+0.51
AGP	Bhupen Roy	46,211	33.79	−2.53
AIUDF	Abdul Batin Khandakar	32,699	23.91	+5.14
Independent	Swapan Mukherjee	3,968	2.90	N/A
CPI(M)	Taren Chandra Ray	3,315	2.42	−0.29
RPI(A)	Bhagirath Ray	836	0.61	N/A
Independent	Samsul Hoque	501	0.36	N/A
NOTA	None of the above	863	0.63	N/A
Margin of victory		2,143	1.57	+0.10
Turnout		1,36,747	90.68	+5.20
Registered electors		1,50,801		
INC gain from AGP		Swing	+1.52	

=== 2011 ===
2011 Assam Legislative Assembly election: Abhayapuri North
Party	Candidate	Votes	%	±%
AGP	Bhupen Roy	38,111	36.32	−3.10
INC	Abdul Hai Nagori	36,574	34.85	−16.59
AIUDF	Abdul Latif Mondal	19,695	18.77	+16.80
BPF	Anju Monowara Begum	4,733	4.51	N/A
CPI(M)	Rabin Das	2,844	2.71	N/A
BJP	Ratul Bharali	1,041	0.99	+0.28
AITC	Nilananda Rajbongshi	709	0.68	N/A
LJP	Aminul Hoque Jwadder	466	0.44	N/A
Lok Bharati	Samsul Hoque	423	0.40	N/A
NCP	Habibur Rahman	337	0.32	−1.32
Majority		1,537	1.47	−10.55
Turnout		1,04,933	85.48	+0.53
Registered electors		1,22,764		
AGP gain from INC		Swing		

=== 2006 ===
Assam Legislative Assembly election, 2006: Abhayapuri North
Party	Candidate	Votes	%	±%
INC	Abdul Hai Nagori	48,977	51.44	
AGP	Bhupen Roy	37,530	39.42	
AIUDF	Makbul Hussain	1,875	1.97	
NCP	Kanteswar Roy	1,564	1.64	
Independent	Dhananjoy Ray	1,485	1.56	
Independent	Ratul Bharali	1,088	1.14	
Independent	Manik Chandra Das	907	0.95	
BJP	Bulbul Hussain	674	0.71	
AGP(P)	Bhadreswar Burman	492	0.52	
NLP	Abdul Khaleque Ahmed	417	0.44	
Independent	Mostafa Ahmed	201	0.21	
Majority		11,447	12.02	
Turnout		95,210	84.95	
Registered electors		1,12,079		
INC gain from AGP		Swing		

== See also ==
- Abhayapuri
- List of constituencies of Assam Legislative Assembly
