= Rafiqul Islam (politician, born 1979) =

Indian politician

Dr., Maulana, Hafiz Rafiqul Islam

Member of Assam Legislative Assembly
- In office 25 October 2019 – 3 May 2026
- Preceded by: Abdul Khaleque
- Constituency: Jania
- In office 13 May 2011 – 19 May 2016
- Preceded by: Abdul Khaleque
- Succeeded by: Abdul Khaleque
- Constituency: Jania

Personal details
- Born: Rafiqul Islam; 3 September 1979 (age 47) Kalgachia, Barpeta district, Assam, India
- Party: All India United Democratic Front
- Spouse: Safwana Khanam
- Children: Mohammad Huzaifa, Sumaiya Bushra, Humaira Bushra
- Education: Jamia Millia Islamia; Darul Uloom Deoband; Gauhati University, (MA – Gold Medal / PhD)
- Profession: Politician and Islamic Theologian

Rafiqul Islam is an Indian politician and member of the Assam Legislative Assembly representing the All India United Democratic Front (AIUDF). He has served multiple terms as the elected representative from the Jania constituency.

== Early life and education ==
Rafiqul Islam was born on 3 September 1979 in Kalgachia, a town in Barpeta district of Assam.

Islam studied Islamic theology at Darul Uloom Deoband. He also received training in English language and literature at the Markazul Ma'arif Education and Research Centre in Bombay (now Mumbai), and later worked as a lecturer at a college in Assam.

He later pursued higher education at Gauhati University, where he earned a Master of Arts (MA) degree with a gold medal and subsequently completed a Doctor of Philosophy (PhD) in 2016.

== Career ==
Rafiqul Islam is not only a politician but also an Islamic theologian. He holds a leadership position as secretary in the Assam State chapter of Jamiat Ulama-e-Hind. He has served as a guest professor at Gauhati University. According to a 2021 report by the Association for Democratic Reforms (ADR), Islam was among the most educated legislators in the Assam Assembly.

== Political career ==
Rafiqul Islam was first elected to the Assam Legislative Assembly from the Jania constituency in 2011 as a candidate of AIUDF. After losing the seat in 2016, he reclaimed it in the 2019 by-election. In the by-election, he received 82,780 votes, defeating Congress candidate Shamsul Hoque (46,639 votes) and BJP candidate Towfiqur Rahman (15,360 votes).

In the lead-up to the 2019 general elections, Islam was announced as the AIUDF candidate from Barpeta, replacing sitting MP Sirajuddin Ajmal. The party, aiming to avoid splitting opposition votes, decided to contest only three Lok Sabha seats: Dhubri, Barpeta, and Karimganj. The BJP alleged a secret alliance between AIUDF and Congress, but both parties denied any formal collaboration.

In 2021, Rafiqul Islam was again nominated by AIUDF for the Jania seat as part of the Congress-led Grand Alliance, also known as the Mahajot, and won the seat in the state assembly elections.

Rafiqul Islam is also the General Secretary of the All India United Democratic Front (AIUDF).

In February 2025, during the Assam Assembly's budget session, he publicly expressed dissatisfaction over the discontinuation of a Friday break traditionally observed to allow Muslim legislators to offer ‘namaz’. He criticized the move, stating that it was "imposed on the strength of numbers" by the ruling party.

In March 2025, Rafiqul Islam supported a demand in the Assam Legislative Assembly for a condemnation motion against BJP MP Sudhanshu Trivedi, who had referred to Dhubri as "mini Bangladesh" in the Rajya Sabha. Islam questioned whether the government considered Dhubri a part of Assam and urged the House to adopt a resolution against the remark.
