= Bongaigaon Assembly constituency =

Constituency of the Assam legislative assembly in India

Coordinates: 26.49°N 90.53°E

Bongaigaon
- Constituency No. 18 for the Assam Legislative Assembly

Constituency details
- Country: India
- Region: Northeast India
- State: Assam
- District: Bongaigaon
- Lok Sabha constituency: Barpeta
- Established: 1967
- Reservation: None

Member of Legislative Assembly
- 16th Assam Legislative Assembly
- Incumbent Diptimayee Choudhury
- Party: AGP
- Alliance: NDA
- Elected year: 2026

Bongaigaon is one of the 126 constituencies of the Assam Legislative Assembly in India. Bongaigaon is part of the Barpeta Lok Sabha constituency.

== Extent of the constituency ==
The constituency includes Bongaigaon Municipality, New Bongaigaon Rly. Colony, Manikpur Dev. Block (Part), Dangtol Dev. Block (Part), and Boitamari Dev. Block (Part).

== Members of Legislative Assembly ==
| Year | Member | Party |
|---|---|---|
| 1967 | Mathura Mohan Sinha | Indian National Congress |
| 1972 | Dhruba Barua | Indian National Congress |
| 1978 | Mathura Mohan Sinha | Janata Party |
| 1983 | Phani Bhusan Choudhury | Independent |
| 1985 | Phani Bhusan Choudhury | Independent |
| 1991 | Phani Bhusan Choudhury | Asom Gana Parishad |
| 1996 | Phani Bhusan Choudhury | Asom Gana Parishad |
| 2001 | Phani Bhusan Choudhury | Asom Gana Parishad |
| 2006 | Phani Bhusan Choudhury | Asom Gana Parishad |
| 2011 | Phani Bhusan Choudhury | Asom Gana Parishad |
| 2016 | Phani Bhusan Choudhury | Asom Gana Parishad |
| 2021 | Phani Bhusan Choudhury | Asom Gana Parishad |
| 2024 By-election | Diptimayee Choudhury | Asom Gana Parishad |
| 2026 | Diptimayee Choudhury | Asom Gana Parishad |

== Election results ==
=== 2026 ===
2026 Assam Legislative Assembly election: Bongaigaon
| Party | Candidate | Votes | % | ±% |
|---|---|---|---|---|
| AGP | Diptimayee Choudhury | 72,247 | 46.08 | −6.32 |
| INC | Girish Baruah | 47,249 | 30.14 | +2.39 |
| Independent(Rebel of BJP) | Chakradhar Das | 32,932 | 20.47 | New |
| NOTA | None of the Above | 2,398 | 1.53 | −0.37 |
| Margin of victory | | 24,998 | 15.94 | −8.61 |
| Turnout | | 1,56,780 | 90.72 | +12.83 |
| Rejected ballots | | | | |
| Registered electors | | | | |
| AGP hold | | Swing | -4.36 (Note: Two-party swing) | |

=== 2024 by-election ===
Assam Legislative Assembly by-election 2024: Bongaigaon
| Party | Candidate | Votes | % | ±% |
|---|---|---|---|---|
| AGP | Diptimayee Choudhury | 74,734 | 52.4 | −1.60 |
| INC | Brajenjit Sinha | 39,570 | 27.75 | −1.25 |
| Independent | Sailendra Sarkar | 13,381 | 9.38 | New |
| NOTA | None of the Above | 2,714 | 1.9 | −0.90 |
| Majority | | 35,164 | 24.65 | −0.55 |
| Turnout | | 1,42,043 | 77.89 | −8.01 |
| AGP hold | | Swing | -1.42 (Note: Two-party swing) | |
| Registered electors | | 1,82,354 | | +3.43 |

=== 2021 ===
2021 Assam Legislative Assembly election: Bongaigaon
| Party | Candidate | Votes | % | ±% |
|---|---|---|---|---|
| AGP | Phani Bhusan Choudhury | 82,800 | 54.00 | −2.03 |
| INC | Shankar Prasad Ray | 44,633 | 29.00 | −4.32 |
| AJP | Dipu Choudhury | 13,988 | 9.00 | New |
| Political Justice Party | Santanu Mukherjee | 2,266 | 1.00 | New |
| Bharatiya Gana Parishad | Sujit Kumar Roy | 2,184 | 1.00 | New |
| NOTA | None of the Above | 2,179 | 1.00 | −0.72 |
| Majority | | 38,167 | 25.20 | +2.49 |
| Turnout | | 1,51,451 | 85.90 | −0.78 |
| Registered electors | | 1,76,306 | | +27.81 |
| AGP hold | | Swing | -3.17 (Note: Two-party swing) | |

=== 2016 ===
2016 Assam Legislative Assembly election: Bongaigaon
| Party | Candidate | Votes | % | ±% |
|---|---|---|---|---|
| AGP | Phani Bhusan Choudhury | 77,292 | 56.03 | |
| INC | Shankar Prasad Ray | 45,972 | 33.32 | |
| Independent | Itesh Bordoloi | 7,087 | 5.13 | |
| Independent | Dhirabati Choudhury | 1,902 | 1.37 | |
| Independent | Prabhat Baisnab | 1,404 | 1.01 | |
| Independent | Fulbar Ali Molya | 1,099 | 0.79 | |
| Independent | Deepak Kumar Das | 815 | 0.59 | |
| NOTA | None of the above | 2,376 | 1.72 | |
| Majority | | 31,320 | 22.71 | |
| Turnout | | 1,37,947 | 86.68 | |
| Registered electors | | 1,59,137 | | |
| AGP hold | | Swing | | |
