= Barpeta Assembly constituency =

Constituency of the Assam legislative assembly in India

Barpeta
- Constituency No. 24 for the Assam Legislative Assembly

Constituency details
- Country: India
- Region: Northeast India
- State: Assam
- District: Barpeta
- Lok Sabha constituency: Barpeta
- Established: 1957
- Reservation: SC

Member of Legislative Assembly
- 16th Assam Legislative Assembly
- Incumbent Dipak Kumar Das
- Party: AGP
- Alliance: NDA
- Elected year: 2026

Barpeta Assembly constituency is one of the 126 assembly constituencies of Assam a Northeastern state of India. Barpeta is part of the Barpeta Lok Sabha constituency.

This constituency is reserved for the Scheduled Caste candidates since 2023.

== Town Details ==
- Country: India.
- State: Assam.
- District: Barpeta district.
- Lok Sabha Constituency: Barpeta Lok Sabha constituency.
- Area Includes: Barpeta MB, Sarthebari TC, Chenga Dev. Block (Part), Gumafulbari Dev. Block (Part), Mandia Dev. Block (Part), Sarukhetri Dev. Block (Part), Barpeta Dev. Block (Part), Pakabetbari Dev. Block (Part), Bhowanipur Dev. Block (Part).

== Member of Legislative Assembly ==
Election	Name	Party
1957	Mahadev Das	Indian National Congress
1957	Srihari Das	Praja Socialist Party
1962	Madhusudan Das	Praja Socialist Party
1965	D. Talukdar	Indian National Congress
1967^	S. N. Das	Praja Socialist Party
1972	Surendra Nath Das	Indian National Congress
1978	A. Latif	Independent politician
1983	Ismail Hussain	Independent politician
1985	Kumar Deepak Das	Independent politician
1991	Ismail Hussain	Indian National Congress
1996	Ismail Hussain	All India Indira Congress
2001	Ismail Hussain	Indian National Congress
2006	Gunindra Nath Das	Asom Gana Parishad
2011	Abdur Rahim Khan	All India United Democratic Front
2016	Gunindra Nath Das	Asom Gana Parishad
2021	Abdur Rahim Ahmed	Indian National Congress
2026	Kumar Deepak Das	Asom Gana Parishad

- ^ denotes bypolls.

== Election results ==
=== 2026 ===
2026 Assam Legislative Assembly election: Barpeta
Party	Candidate	Votes	%	±%
AGP	Dipak Kumar Das	94,086	62.88	+26.07
Independent	Gagan Chandra Haloi	46,684	31.20	New
NOTA	None of the above (India)	5,195	3.47	+3.51
Independent	Uddhab Chandra Das	3,670	2.45	New
Margin of victory		47,402	31.68	+7.87
Turnout		149,635	87.06	−4.37
Registered electors				
AGP gain from INC		Swing	+1.26	

Rejected Nominations
Party	Candidate	Votes	%	±%
INC	Mahananda Sarkar			

=== 2021 ===
2021 Assam Legislative Assembly election: Barpeta
Party	Candidate	Votes	%	±%
INC	Abdur Rahim Ahmed	111,083	61.62	+26.23
Asom Gana Parishad	Gunindra Nath Das	66,364	36.81	−2.14
NOTA	None of the above (India)	1,727	0.96	+0.39
Margin of victory		44,719	24.81	+21.25
Turnout		180,265	91.43	+1.33
Registered electors		197,165		+8.90
INC gain from AGP		Swing	+22.67	

=== 2016 ===
2016 Assam Legislative Assembly election: Barpeta
Party	Candidate	Votes	%	±%
AGP	Gunindra Nath Das	63,563	38.95	+4.94
INC	A. Rahim Ahmed	57,753	35.39	+20.57
AIUDF	Abdur Rahim Khan	37,697	23.10	−20.29
Independent	Sanjay Kumar Das	936	0.57	N/A
RPI	Atikur Rahman	820	0.50	N/A
Independent	Faruk Khan	774	0.47	N/A
Independent	Sohrab Hussain	672	0.41	N/A
NOTA	None of the above	937	0.57	N/A
Majority		5,810	3.56	−5.82
Turnout		1,63,152	90.11	+3.79
Registered electors		1,81,058		+19.16
AGP gain from AIUDF		Swing	-4.44	

=== 2011 ===
2011 Assam Legislative Assembly election: Barpeta
Party	Candidate	Votes	%	±%
AIUDF	Abdur Rahim Khan	56,915	43.39	+31.06
AGP	Gunindra Nath Das	44,606	34.01	−7.98
INC	Abdul Kayem	19,443	14.82	−24.58
BPF	Abdul Kaddus	4,941	3.77	N/A
BJP	Amiya Kumar Talukdar	3,962	3.02	−1.49
AITC	Jeherul Haque	1,297	0.99	N/A
Majority		12,309	9.38	+6.79
Turnout		1,31,164	86.32	+4.99
Registered electors		1,51,943		+
AIUDF gain from AGP		Swing	+11.54	

=== 2006 ===
Assam Legislative Assembly election, 2006: Barpeta
Party	Candidate	Votes	%	±%
AGP	Gunindra Nath Das	48,052	41.99	−3.77
INC	Ismail Hussain	45,087	39.40	−6.55
AIUDF	Abdus Samad Ahmed	14,115	12.33	
BJP	Anjali Das Choudhury	5,167	4.51	
AGP(P)	Dharanidhar Das	1,238	1.08	
NCP	Abdul Latif	764	0.66	
Majority		2,965	2.59	
Turnout		1,14,423	81.33	
AGP gain from INC		Swing		

== See also ==
- Barpeta
- Barpeta district
- List of constituencies of Assam Legislative Assembly
