= Ambika Charan Choudhury =

Indian litterateur, historian and activist

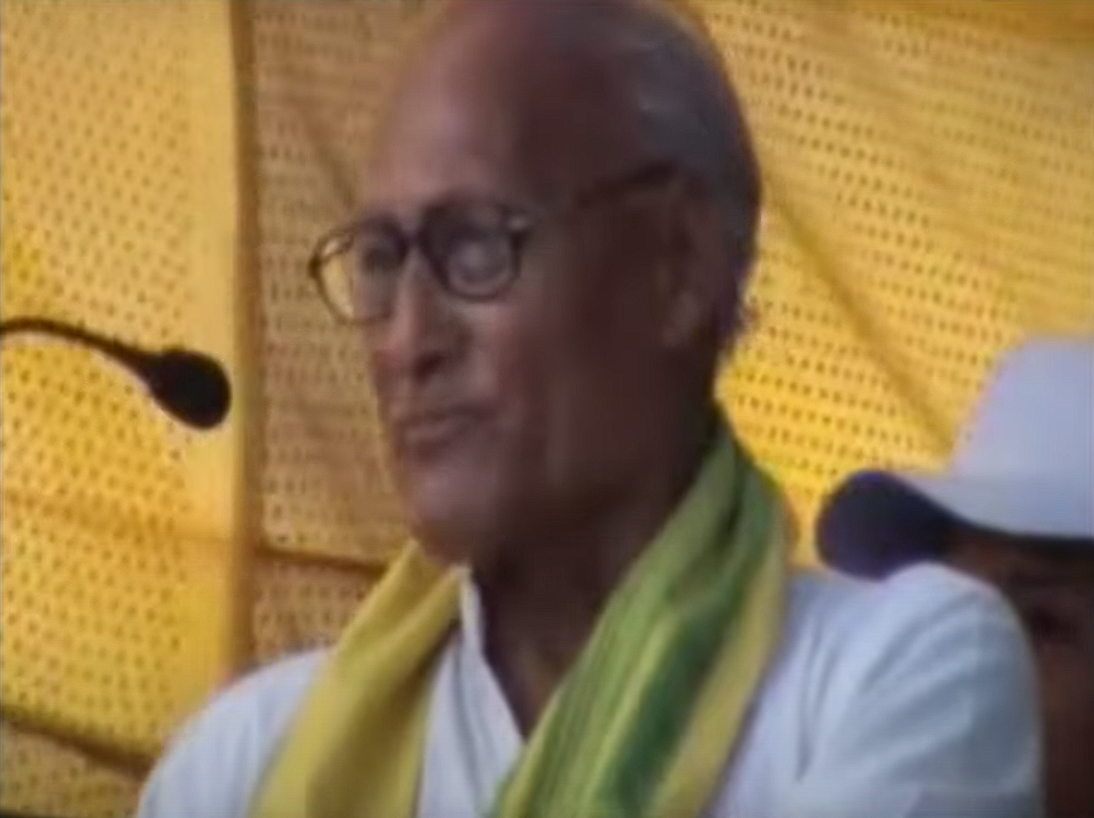
- Ambika Charan Choudhury at International Seminar at Chandrapara, Assam on 24th Sept 2011
- Born: 16 August 1930; Borpara, Bongaigaon, British India
- Died: 4 December 2011 (aged 81); Kamakhyaguri, West Bengal
- Resting place: Bongaigaon
- Citizenship: Indian
- Education: Graduation
- Alma mater: Cotton College; Gauhati University
- Occupations: School principal Writer; Historian; Activist
- Spouse: Kuldabala Choudhury
- Children: 5
- Writing career
- Pen name: Kamataratna
- Language: Assamese
- Notable works: Ratnapeethot Ebhumiki, Koch Rajbongshi Janagosthi Itihax and Sanskriti (20110), Sangram Singha Mahabir Chilarai (1983), The Koche Around the World (1991), Kamotapurot Mahapurush Sri Manta Sankardev (1982)
- Notable awards: 1994: Assam Government Literary Pension; 2003: Mahendra Nath Karan Award; 2008: Bir Chilarai Award
- Movements: Koch-Rajbanshi language and culture

Ambika Charan Choudhury (16 August 1930 – 4 December 2011), popularly known as Kamataratna, was an Indian litterateur, historian, and activist, known for his contributions to the Assamese literature.

== Early life and education ==
Born on 16 August 1930 to a poor family, Nareshwar Choudhury (father) and Kashiguri Devi (mother), in Borpara village of Bongaigaon, Ambika Charan Choudhury attended schooling in local Birjhara High School, Bongaigaon. He obtained a graduate degree from Cotton College, Guwahati. After that he joined government services at Shillong. Later he changed several jobs and finally retired as Principal of Bongaigaon Normal School.

== Social life ==
Choudhury always got attached to many social and political organisations. He devoted most of his life towards the development and promotion of Rajbanshi language and culture, also known as Goalpariya. He was an executive member of Assam Xahitya Xabha, joint secretary of OBC Xahitya Xabha, secretary of undivided Goalpara District Xahitya Xabha, and secretary of Koch-Rajbanshi Sanmilany. He was also the founder of many educational institutions in western Assam. Choudhury was leading the popular demand for Schedule Tribe status to the Koch-Rajbangshi community since 1958. He was actively involved with the Sanmilita Jatiya Abhibartan, which is facilitating the peace process between the Government of India and the moderate wing of the rebel group ULFA.

He died on 4 December 2011 in a road mishap at Tetultola near Kamakhyaguri in West Bengal. He left behind his wife, three daughters, and two sons.

== Literary works ==
Ambika Choudhury started his major literary journey through Ratnapeethot Ebhumiki, a book written in 1961. He wrote columns regularly in the Ramdhenu journal published from Guwahati. He had written more than 123 valuable articles and 29 books mostly on the Rajbangshi language and culture. Koch-Rajbanshi Jatir Itihakh aru Sanskriti, Kamatapurot Mohapurush Sreemanta Sankardev, Xantirdut Hajrat Mohammad, The Koches Around the World, Koch-Rajbanshies betrayed, Biswabir Chila Roy Sahitya Pratibha, Rani Abhayeswari and Bijni Rajyar Itibritta are some of his notable books written in Assamese and English.

== Awards and honours ==
Choudhury was a recipient of the Bir Chilarai award, instituted by the Government of Assam. He was regarded as the backbone of the Koch-Rajbanshi language movement and was conferred the title of Kamataratna by many cultural and literary organisations.
