= Manikpur, Assam =

Manikpur
- Town
- Location in Assam, India Manikpur (India)
- Coordinates: 26.463378°N 90.803527°E
- Country: India
- State: Assam
- Region: Lower Assam
- District: Bongaigaon

Languages
  - Official: Assamese
- Time zone: UTC+5:30 (IST)
- PIN: 783392
- Telephone code: 03664-XXXXXX
- Vehicle registration: AS-19

Manikpur is a small town and a Block and a Sub division in Bongaigaon district in the Indian state of Assam. Manikpur is 33 km far from its district main city Bongaigaon . It is 155 km far from its state capital Dispur. The majority of the people in Manikpur belong to the Koch community of Austro-Mongoloid ethnicity. With the passage of time, Assamese caste Hindus and Muslims have started settling in Manikpur. Politically, the area is part of Abhayapuri North (Assembly constituency).

== History ==
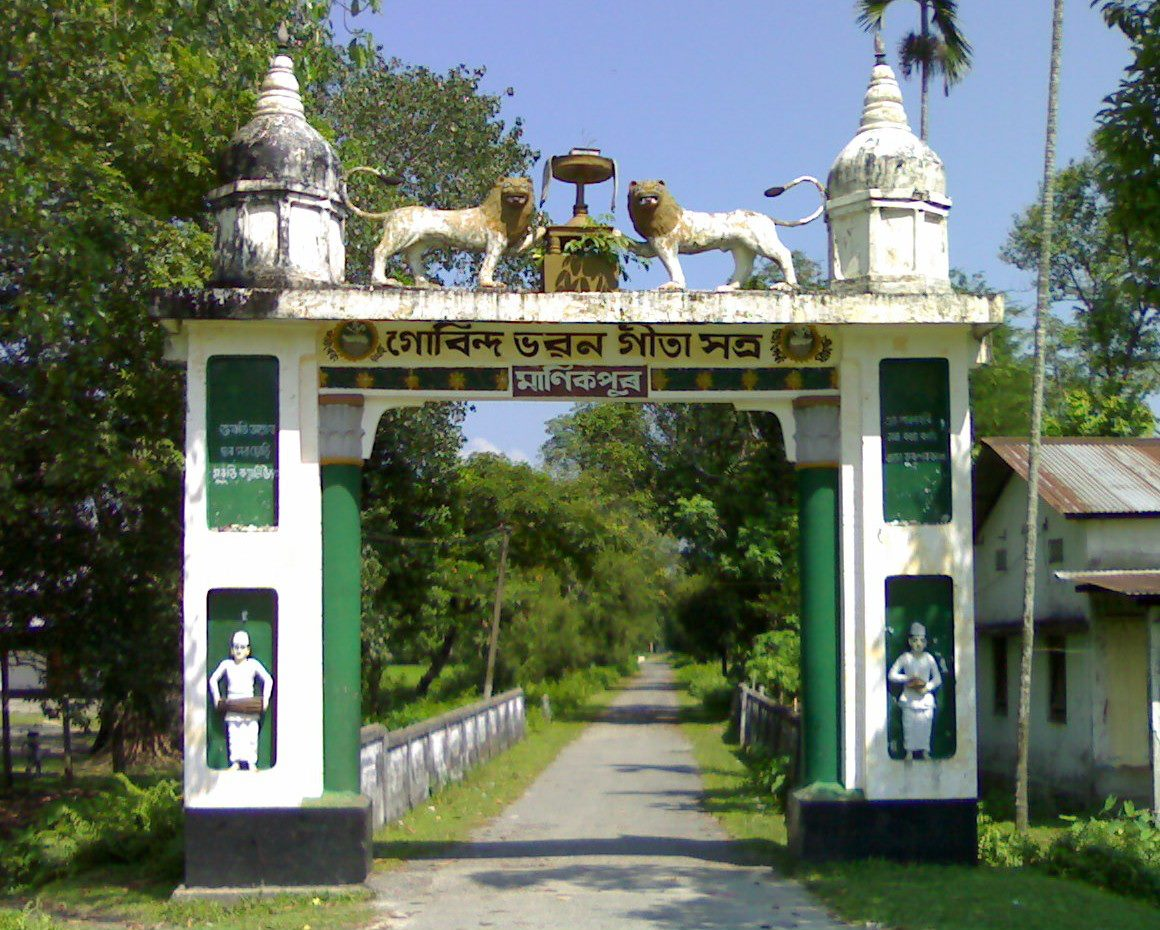
Govinda Bhawan Geeta Sattra, Manikpur

Manikpur is famous for its rich cultural heritage and religious unity. The Govinda Bhawan Geeta Sattra (Xatra) is one of the center of Hindu vashnavite sects of Hinduism founded by Krishananda Brahmasari who was born and brought up in Abadi village. The Ashram is situated in the heart of Manikpur. The majority of the people living in Manikpur belong to Koch community of Austro-Mongoloid ethnic group. The Manikpur area is inhabited by other group of people from 1962 after the construction of National Highway 31. The other inhabitants of Manikpur belong to Upper Caste Hindu-Assamese & Bengali and Muslims. Manikpur is declared as new civil sub division of Bongaigaon district on 25 January 2016 (on republic day eve) by the Chief Minister of Assam Mr Tarun Gogoi. Manikpur sub division was inaugurated on 29 February 2016. The SDO office is temporarily being run from PWD inspection Bungalow. Manikpur is a peaceful place.

== Demography ==
The majority of the population is dominated by Koch, Bodos, Yogi Nath, Bengali scheduled caste, Goria Muslims, etc. With the passage of time Assamese caste Hindus and Miya Muslims have started settling in Manikpur.

== Divisions ==
There are 12 gaon panchayat under Manikpur Block.

- Alukhunda
- Baghamara Chawraguri
- Basbari Salabila
- Bhandara
- Dangaigaon
- Goraimari
- Hapachara
- Manikpur
- Jhawbari
- Nowapara
- Palengbari
- Patiladohha

The villages comes under Manikpur gaon panchayat under Bongaigaon district are

- Borbila
- Dompara
- Kahibari
- Manikpur (Boripara)
- Mowkhowa.

== Festivals ==
There are several important traditional festivals celebrated in Manikpur. Mukoli Bihu is the most important and commonly celebrated festival. Laxmi puja is another festival celebrated with great enthusiasm. Muslims celebrate two Eids (Eid ul-Fitr and Eid al-Adha).

== Education ==
There are several educational institutions in Manikpur. The schools formed by the local people were provincialised by the Assam Govt. Number of private schools are also established in Manikpur since 1997.

College: Manikpur Anchalik College.

Schools: Manikpur Higher Secondary School, Manikpur Girls High School, Manikpur Sr. Basic School, Little Flower English Medium School, Sankardev Sishu Niketon, Bright point Academy etc.

== Transportation ==
Manikpur is well connected by bus and train with all the surrounding areas. The renamed National Highway 27, old National Highway 31 connects Manikpur with the rest of India. The nearest railway station is Patiladoha. New Bongaigaon railway station where all major train has stoppages, is 40 km from Manikpur.GNB international airport is about 4 hours journey from Manikpur which could be reached either via Goalpara or Barpeta Road. There is regular bus service from Manikpur to Guwahati.

== Politics ==
Manikpur is part of Abhayapuri North (Assembly constituency).
