= Mandia =

- village
- Location in Assam Mandia (India)
- Coordinates: 26.253356°N 90.952764°E
- Country: India
- State: Assam
- District: Barpeta

Population (2011)
  - Total: 3,231
- Time zone: UTC+5:30 (IST)
- Website: https://umain30.com/miya

Mandia is a developed village in the Barpeta district of Assam, India. It is located along the Bhelengi River. Nearby villages include Satra Kanara, Bhatkuchi, Bamun Dongra, Sonapur Rubhi, Sitoli, Govindupur and Gajia. It is located 8 km south of district headquarter Barpeta and headquarter of the Mandia Development Block. The main market is Mandia Bazaar, where a weekly Haat bazaar takes place on Monday. After the delimitation of the constituency, Mandia has been formed as a full constituency.

== Demographics ==
The village comes under of Mandia LAC (126), with a majority of inhabitants belonging to East Bengal-rooted Muslim. According to the 2011 census, the total 3000 population is fairly evenly split between males and females. Mandia has a slightly lower literacy rate of 69% compared to Assam's 72%, and within the village the male population has a higher rate of literacy than the female population. Hindu Assamese, Hindu Bengali are also inhabitant in Mandia.

== Transport ==
The Barpeta Mandia Road connects the village with district. The people of Mandia faces traffic problems because of narrow bridge over the Bhelengi river.Public transport buses and mini buses are available which connects the district and the city Guwahati.
