= Tihu Assembly constituency =

Assembly constituency of Assam

Tihu
- Constituency No. 40 for the Assam Legislative Assembly

Constituency details
- Country: India
- Region: Northeast India
- State: Assam
- District: Nalbari
- Lok Sabha constituency: Barpeta
- Established: 2023
- Reservation: None

Tihu Assembly constituency is one of the 126 assembly constituencies of Assam a north east state of India. It was newly formed in 2023.

== Election Results ==
=== 2026 ===
2026 Assam Legislative Assembly election: Tihu
Party	Candidate	Votes	%	±%
BJP	Chandra Mohan Patowary	100855	56.26	
INC	Ratul Patuwary	74359	41.48	
NOTA	NOTA	2147	1.2	
Margin of victory		26496		
Turnout		179252		
Rejected ballots				
Registered electors				
BJP win (new seat)				

== See also ==
- List of constituencies of Assam Legislative Assembly
