= Pakabetbari Assembly constituency =

Assembly constituency of Assam

Pakabetbari
- Constituency No. 25 for the Assam Legislative Assembly

Constituency details
- Country: India
- Region: Northeast India
- State: Assam
- Division: Lower Assam
- District: Barpeta
- Lok Sabha constituency: Barpeta
- Established: 2023
- Reservation: None

Member of Legislative Assembly
- 16th Assam Legislative Assembly
- Incumbent Jakir Hussain Sikdar
- Party: Indian National Congress
- Alliance: Asom Sonmilito Morcha
- Elected year: 2026

Pakabetbari Assembly constituency is one of 126 assembly constituencies of the Assam Legislative Assembly in India. This constituency forms part of the Barpeta Lok Sabha constituency. It was newly formed in 2023.

== Election Results ==
=== 2026 ===
2026 Assam Legislative Assembly election: Pakatbetbari
Party	Candidate	Votes	%	±%
INC	Jakir Hussain Sikdar	158,007	60.06	
AIUDF	Minakshi Rahman	92,481	35.21	
AGP	Tara Prasad Das	9,246	3.52	
NOTA	NOTA	1,454	0.55	
Margin of victory		65,267	24.85	
Turnout		262,631	94.71	
Rejected ballots				
Registered electors				
INC win (new seat)				
