= Abdur Rahim Khan (politician) =

Indian politician

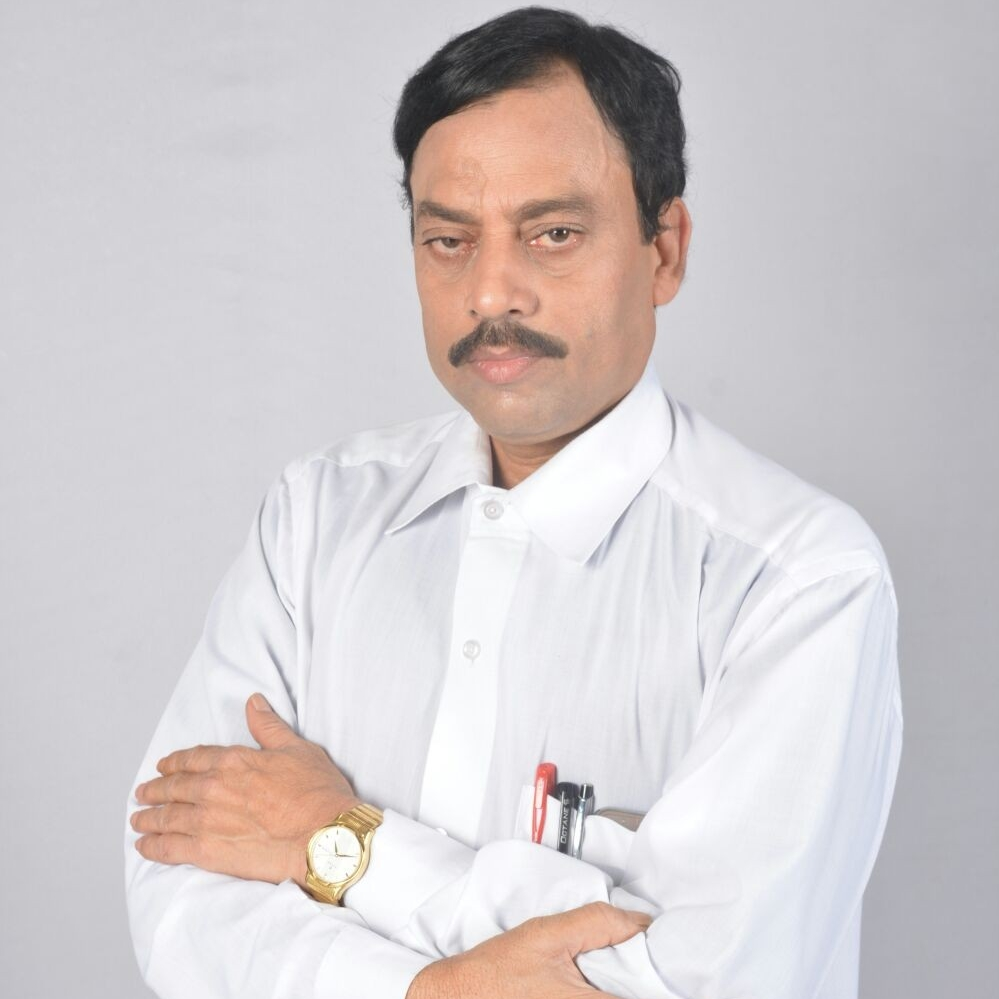

MLA of Barpera Vidhan Sabha Constituency
- In office 2011–2016
- Preceded by: Gunindra Nath Das
- Succeeded by: Gunindra Nath Das
- Constituency: Barpeta

Personal details
- Born: 1 April 1966 Barpeta
- Died: 19 June 2023 (aged 57)
- Party: All India United Democratic Front

Abdur Rahim Khan is an Indian politician from All India United Democratic Front party. In 2011 he was elected as MLA of Barpera Vidhan Sabha Constituency in Assam Legislative Assembly.
