= Bongaigaon =

City in Assam, India

- Town
- Bongaigaon Town
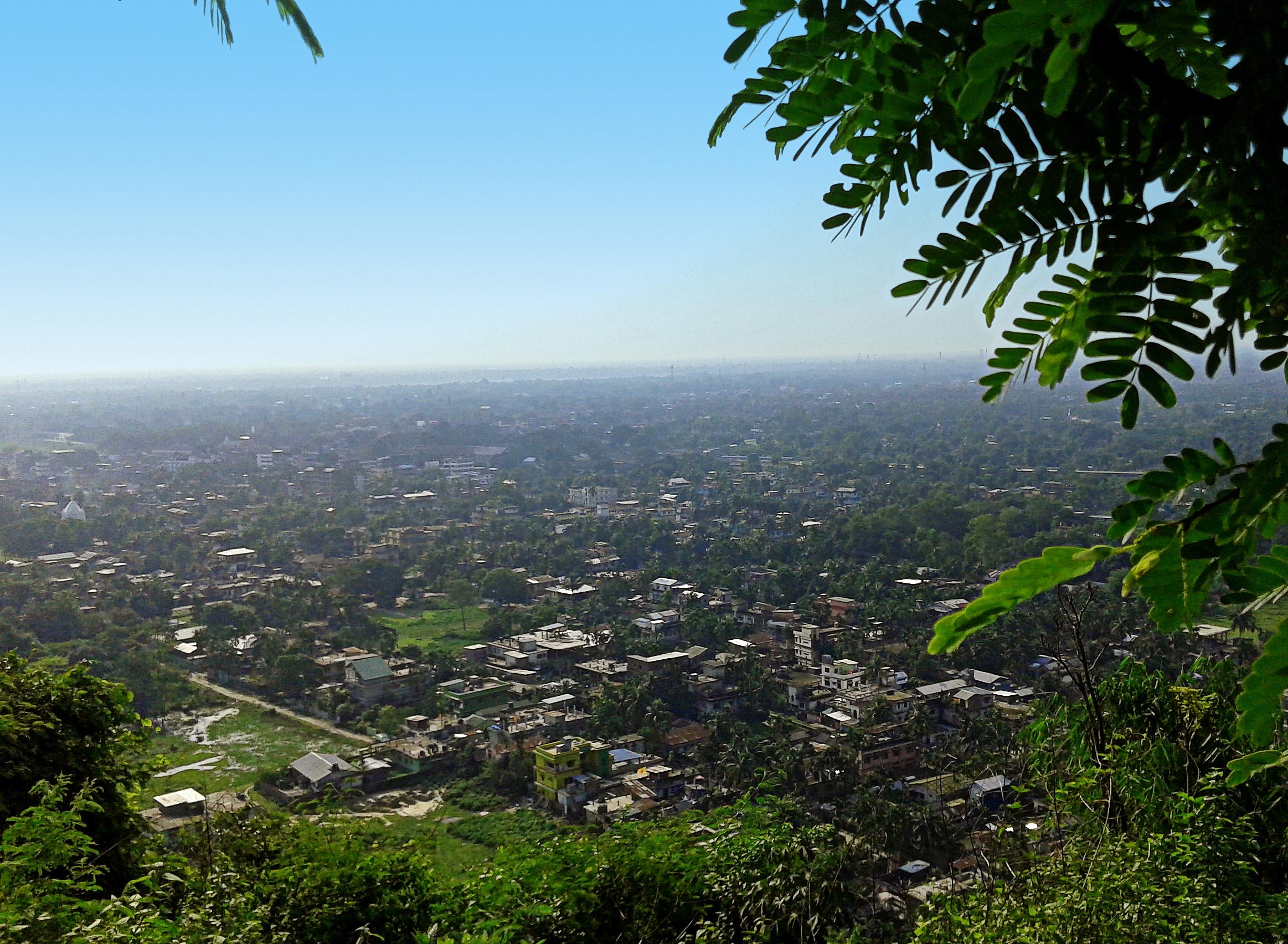
- Nickname: Commercial and Industrial Hub of Assam
- Location in Assam, India
- Coordinates: 26°28′37″N 90°33′30″E
- Country: India
- State: Assam
- Region: Lower Assam
- District: Bongaigaon

Government
  - Type: Municipality
  - Body: Bongaigaon Municipal Board
  - District Commissioner: Shri Lakhinandan Saharia, ACS
  - Senior Superintendent of Police: Shri Numal Mahatta, APS

Area
  - Total: 14 km^{2} (5.4 sq mi)
- Elevation: 62.6 m (205 ft)

Population (2011)
  - Total: 67,322
  - Density: 4,800/km^{2} (12,000/sq mi)

Languages
  - Official: Assamese, English
- Time zone: UTC+5:30 (IST)
- Telephone code: 03664
- Vehicle registration: AS-19,
- Sex ratio: 961 per 1000 male (Census 2011) ♂/♀
- Website: bongaigaon.assam.gov.in

Bongaigaon (/bɒŋˈɡaɪɡaʊ/ or /bɔ.ŋai.ɡãʊ/) is a city and municipality in the Indian state of Assam. Its urban area spans across Bongaigaon and Chirang district. It also acts as the administrative district headquarters of Bongaigaon district and commercial and industrial hub of the west part of the state of Assam.

Bongaigaon is referred to as the gateway of railways in Assam, as its New Bongaigaon Junction railway station is the third largest railway station in Northeast Frontier Railway zone and second largest in Assam.

== Etymology ==
The name Bongaigaon has been associated with more than one explanation. One explanation connects the name with the Aie River and its alluvial deposits. A low-lying area raised by riverine sand, pebbles and debris carried by recurrent floods was called “Bang”, described as an Indo-Mongoloid word corresponding to “Bam” in Assamese. The term referred to an artificially raised highland suitable for habitation and cultivation. The combination of “Bang” and “Aie” is explained as “Bangai”, which eventually came to be pronounced as “Bongai” and developed into “Bongaigaon.”

This explanation was arrived at during a public meeting held on 27 July 2013, organised by the Bongaigaon Sanskritic Manch, in the presence of leading citizens, historians and scholars of the locality. The linguistic association of Bang/Bam may also be considered in the historical context of the Koch people, whose traditional language belongs to the broader Tibeto-Burman linguistic sphere of the region.

Another traditional explanation derives the name from “Bon” (wild) and “Gai” (cow), referring to the presence of wild cattle in the surrounding hills and forests. According to this tradition, wild cattle were once a menace to villagers and were driven away to protect crops, giving rise to the name Bon-Gai-Gaon.

== History ==
=== Bijni Kingdom ===
The area was ruled by zamindars hailing from the Koch belonging to Indo-Mongoloid ethnic group of peoples from the 16th century to the end of princely states in 1956.

=== Administrative changes under British rule ===
The original Goalpara district was first created in 1822 by David Scott, an employee of the East India Company and the first Commissioner of newly created North east Rangpur district headquarters at Rangpur town (now in Bangladesh). The newly created Goalpara district was connected with North-east Rangpur district for administration. The area, formerly part of the Bijni Kingdom, which included the undivided Garo Hills district constituted the Undivided Goalpara district area in 1822. In 1866, Garo Hills was separated from the Goalpara district area, and in the same year a new district named "Greater Koch Behar" was created and the remaining portion of Goalpara district was withdrawn from Rangpur and tagged with Koch Behar. In 1874 a new province, the Assam Valley Province, was created by the British government, and Goalpara district area was withdrawn from Koch Behar and tagged with Assam Province, which continues until today. The original Goalpara district is now split into five districts: Goalpara, Dhubri, Kokrajhar, Bongaigoan, and Chirang.

=== Creation of Bongaigaon and modern era ===
On 14 March 1989, bombs from separatist tribal militants exploded in Bongaigaon, killing 17 and wounding at least 48.

The government of Assam decided in 1989 to create a new district of Bongaigaon, carving out some areas of the Goalpara and Kokrajhar Districts with its headquarters located at Bongaigaon. On 29 September 1989, the creation of Bongaigaon District was declared by the Government of Assam with its headquarters at Bongaigaon.

In June 2022, heavy floods in Assam affected the residents of Bongaigaon.

== Administration ==
The Bongaigaon Town Committee was first constituted in 1961 and was upgraded to a municipal board in 1977. Presently the Municipal Area consists of 25 wards covering an area of 14.31 sq m.

Bongaigaon is part of Barpeta (Lok Sabha constituency). Diptimayee Choudhury is the current M.L.A. of the Bongaigaon constituency.

== Geography ==
Bongaigaon is located at 26°28′37″N 90°33′30″E. It has an average altitude of 62.6 metres. The town is situated 200 km west of the state capital and has an important place in the communication network of Assam and wider northeast India. The New Bongaigaon railway station is a major hub connecting Assam with the rest of India. This town is also very well connected by road through the National Highways 31 B and 31C. This connectivity and the strategic location of the town in the region have made it an important centre in trade and commerce in Western Assam, serving a vast hinterland. It is one of the biggest industrial towns in Lower Assam. The district is part of the Brahmaputra River's basin.

=== Climate ===
Bongaigaon has a borderline monsoon-influenced humid subtropical climate (Köppen Cwa) marginally too cool to be a tropical savanna climate (Aw). During the "cool" season from November to February, afternoons are warm to very warm and mornings are cool. In the "hot" season of March and April, the weather becomes hot and thunderstorm rainfalls increase in frequency to prelude the oppressive monsoon season from June to September, when heavy rains fall every afternoon.

== Demography ==
Bongaigaon is a Class II municipal area, as classified by the Union Ministry of Housing and Urban Affairs, Government of India and ranks eighth in the state among the listed municipal areas, with a population of 93,650.

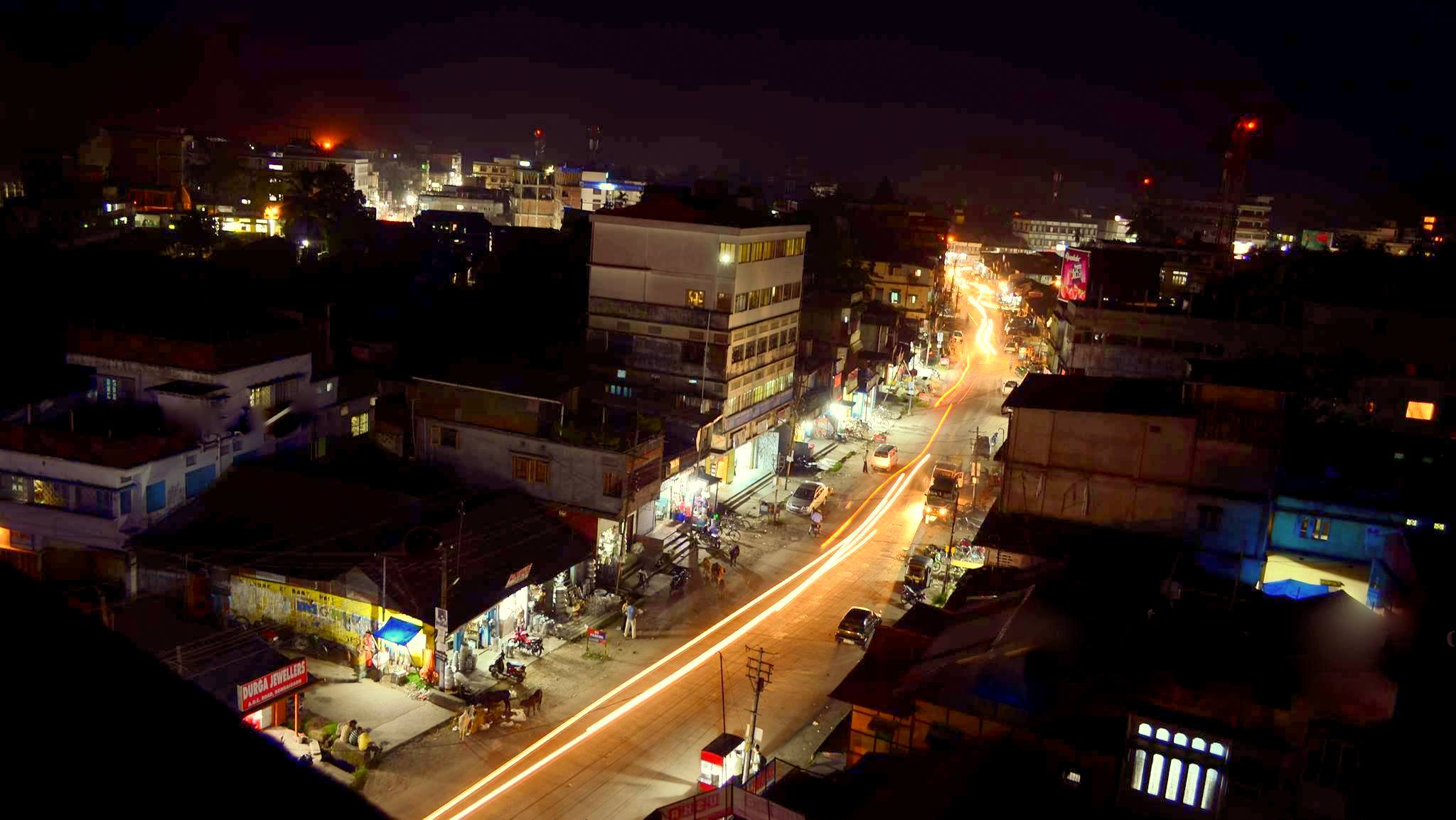
Skyline of Bongaigaon City

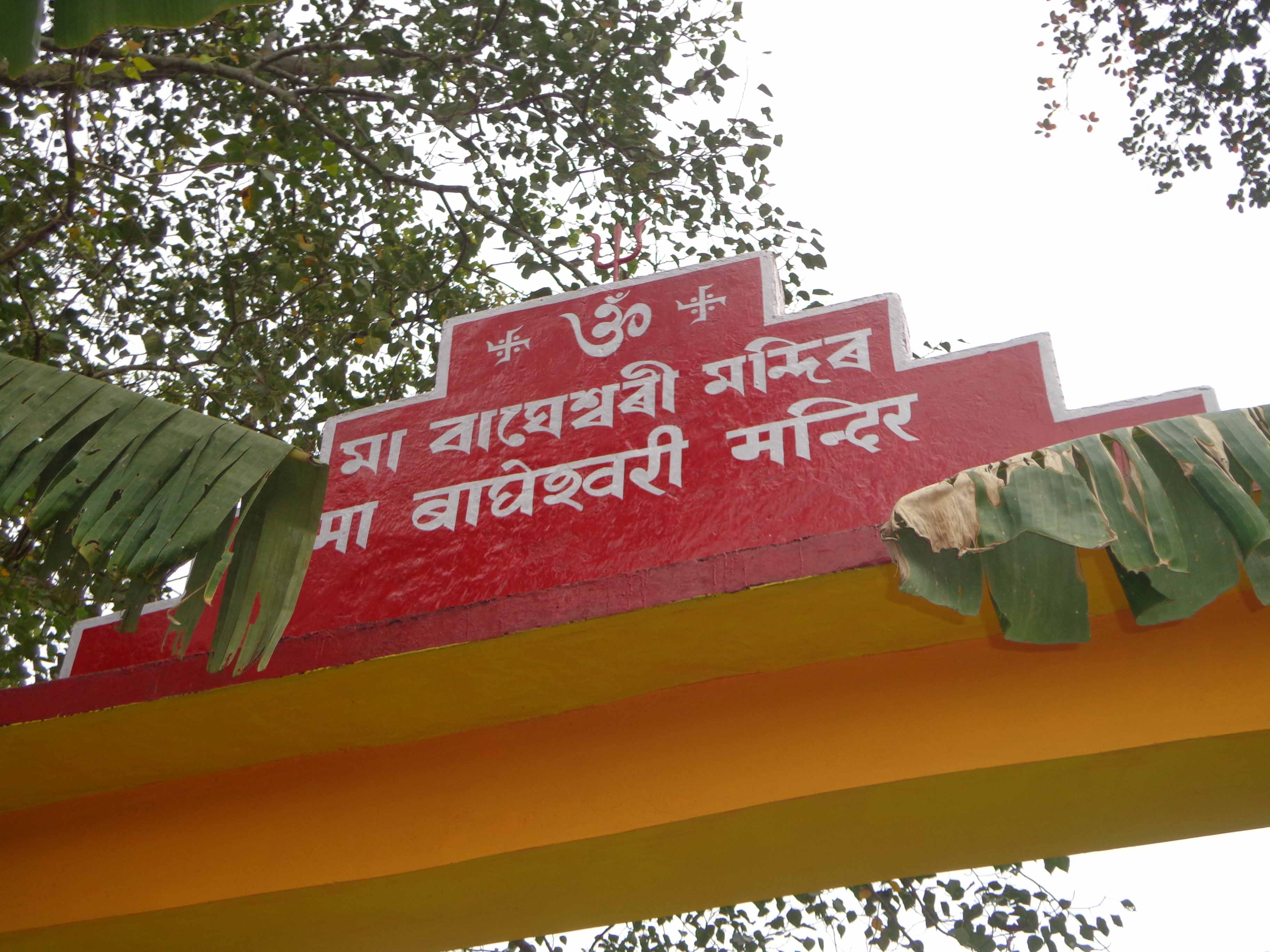
Entrance of Bagheswari Temple

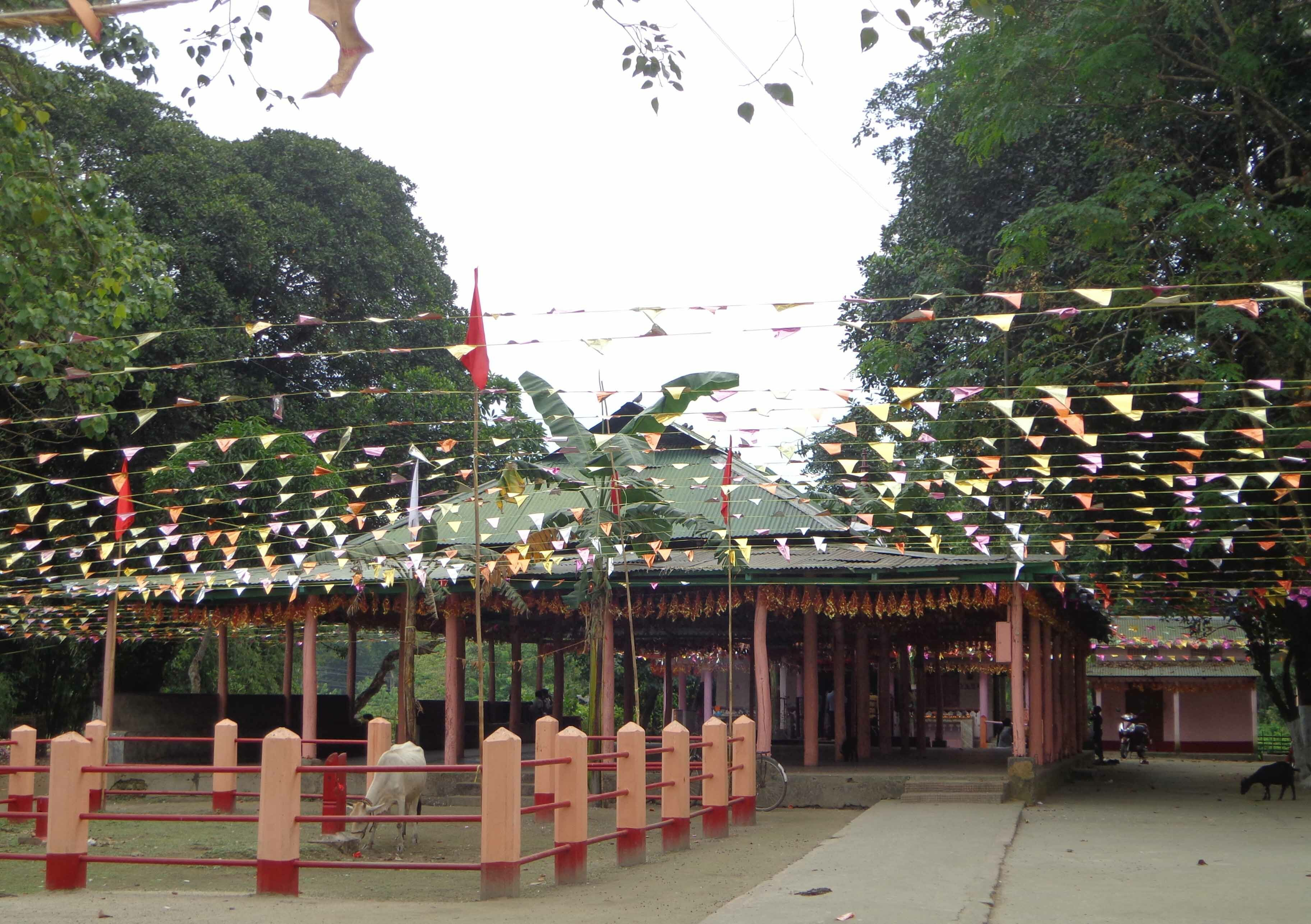
Bagheswari Temple

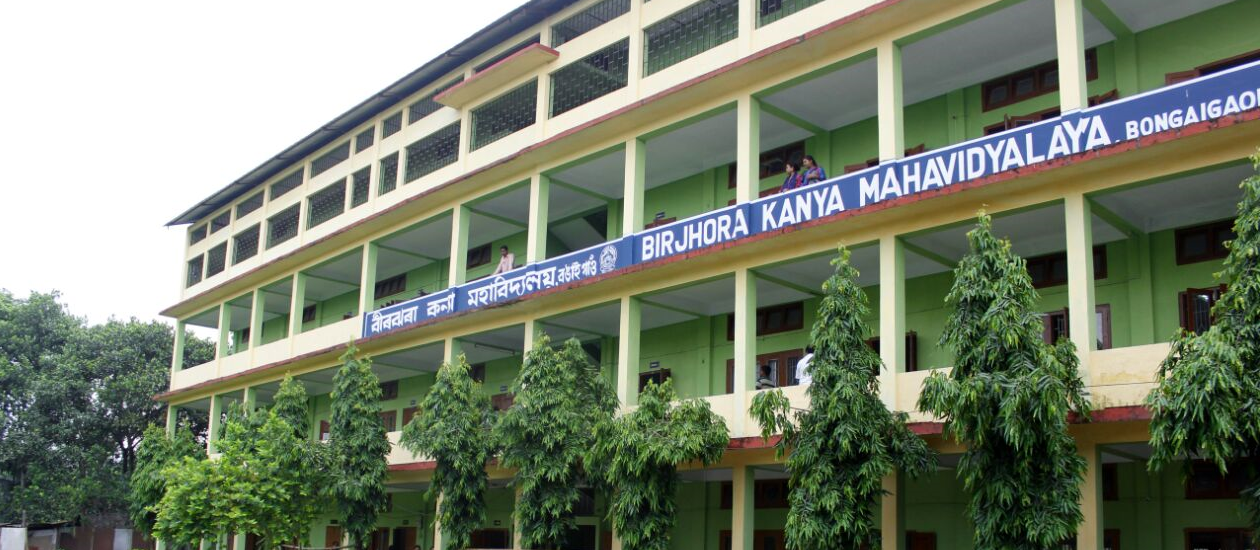
Birjhora kanya mahavidyalaya

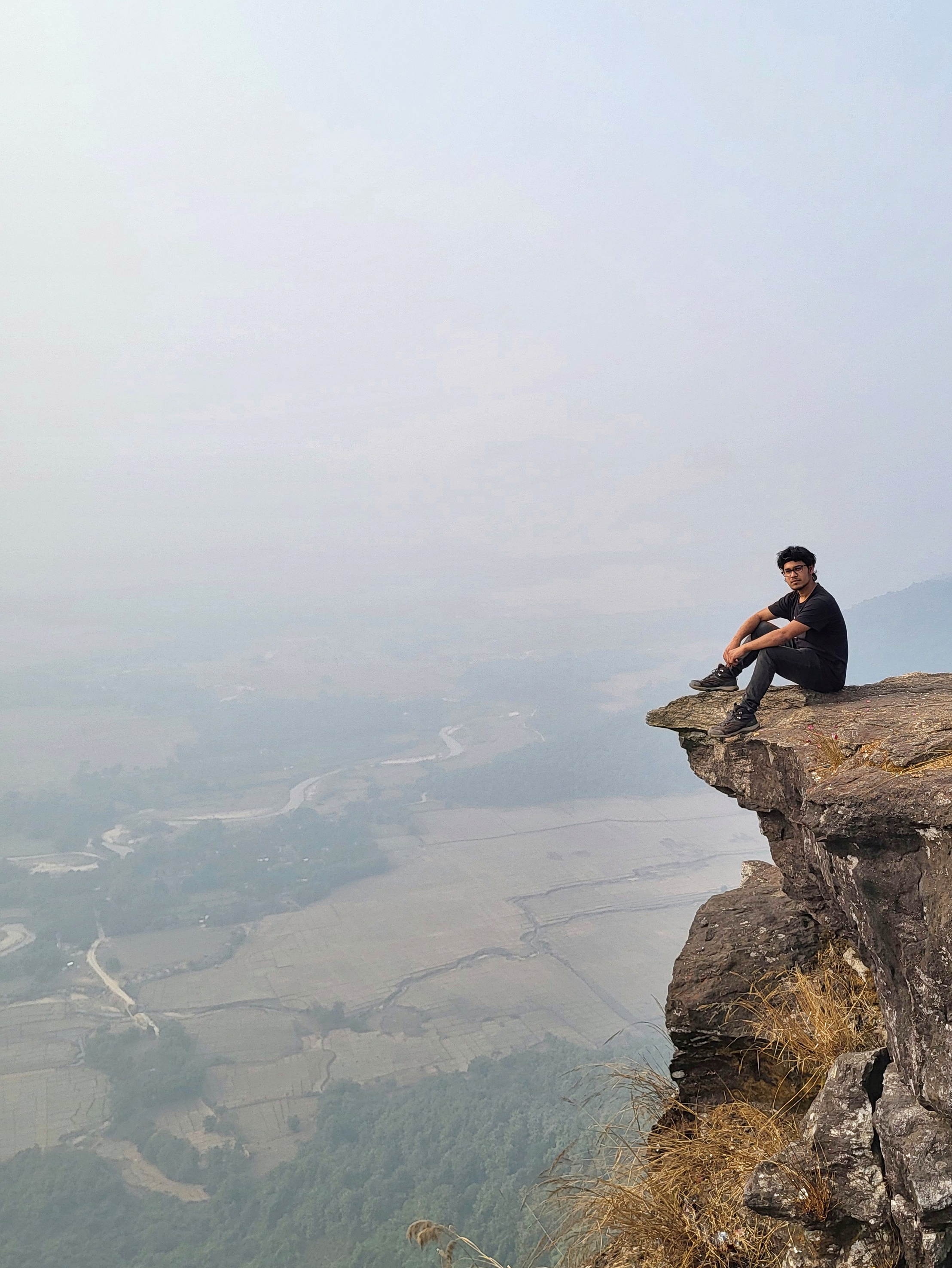
A traveler in Nakkati Hill

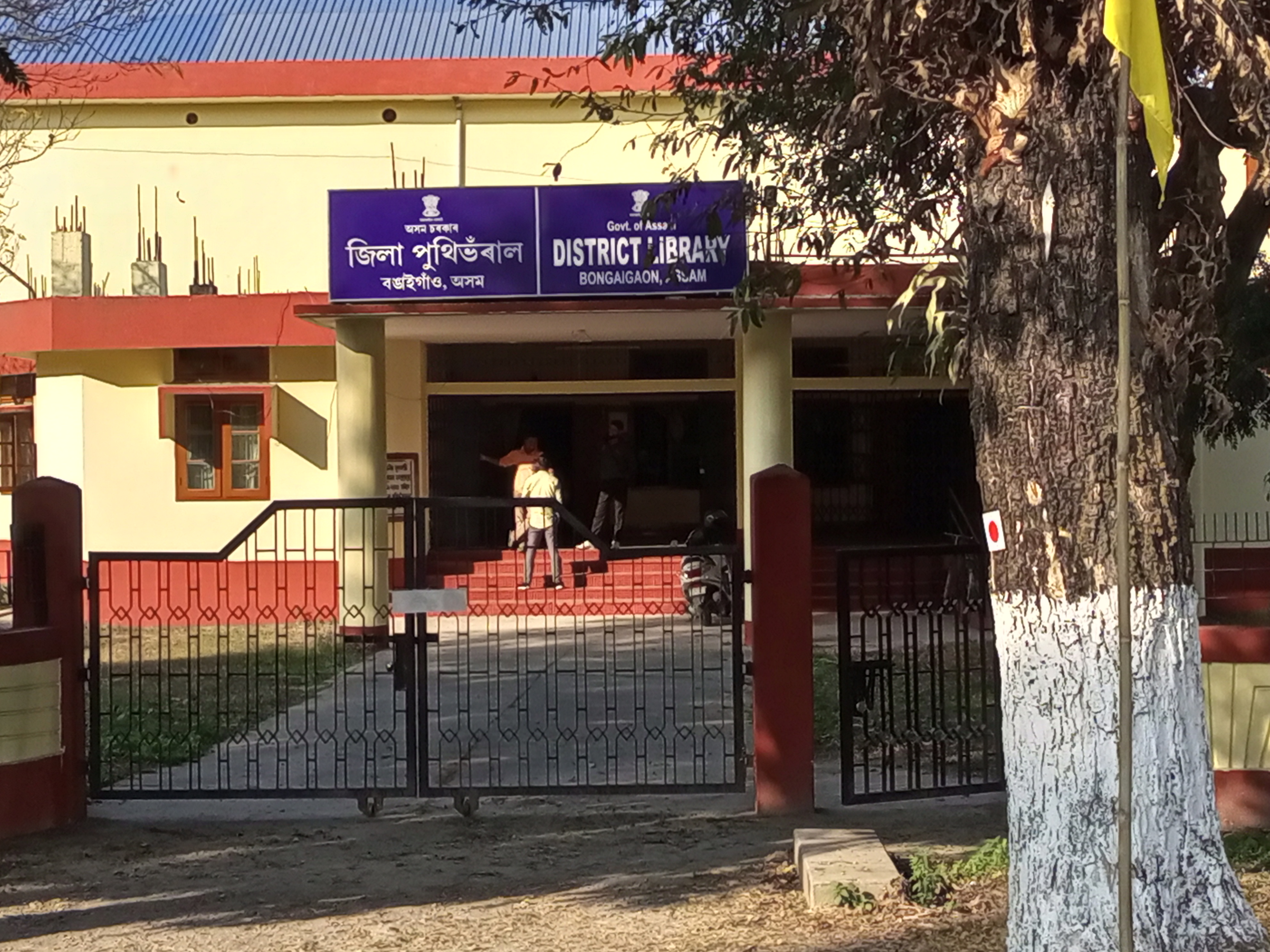
Front view of Bongaigaon District Library

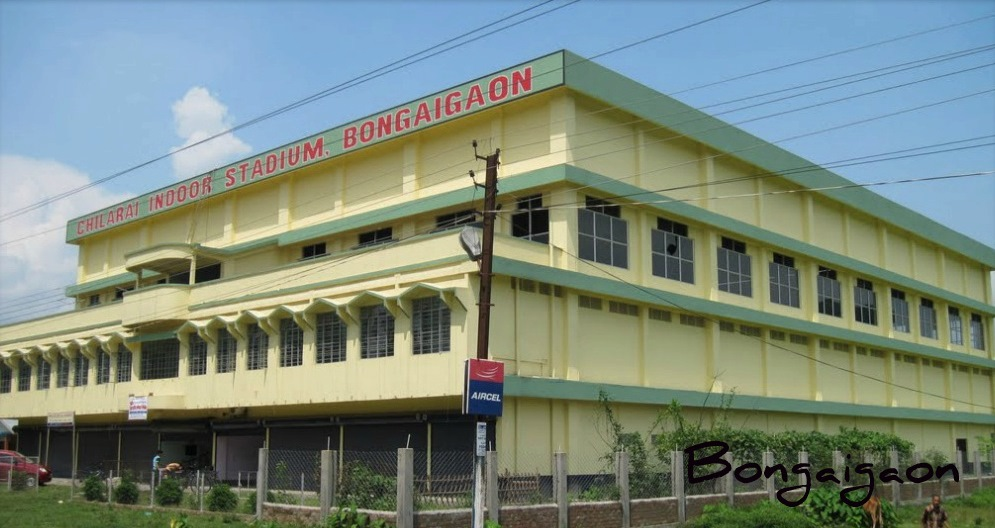
Chilarai Indoor Stadium

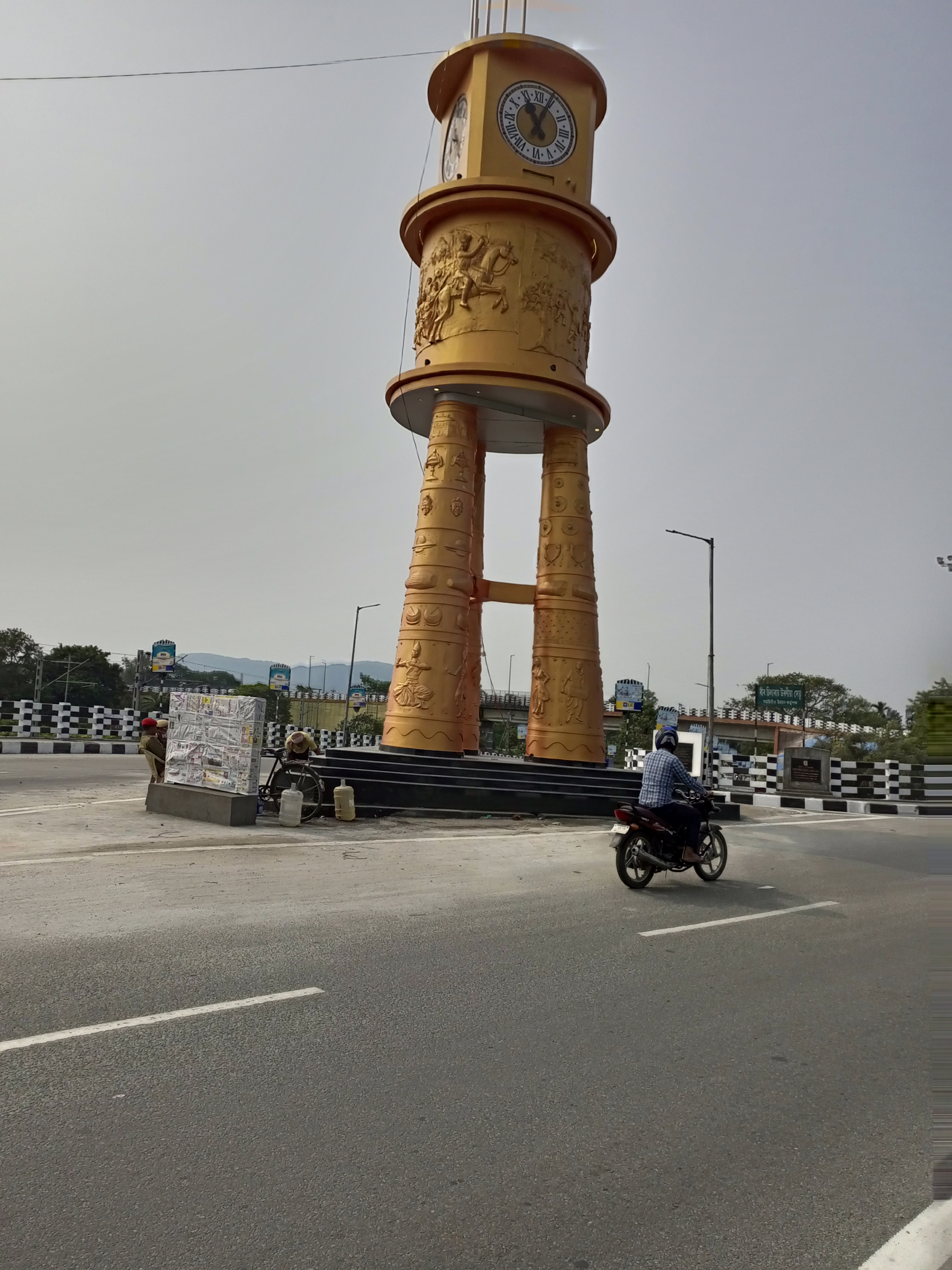
Clock tower at Bongaigaon Flyover

== Notable people ==
- Ambika Charan Choudhury, writer, poet

== See also ==
- List of cities in Assam by population
