= Dharmeswar Roy =

Indian politician (born 1977)

Dharmeswar Roy (born 1977) is an Indian politician from Assam. He is a Member of the Legislative Assembly from the Bajali Assembly constituency in Bajali district representing the Asom Gana Parishad.

Roy is from Bajali, Assam. He is the son of the late Madan Chandra Roy. He did his Bachelor in Arts in 2002 at Balaji College which is affiliated with Gauhati University. He declared assets worth Rs.47 lakhs in his affidavit to the Election Commission of India.

== Career ==
Roy won the Bajali Assembly constituency representing the Asom Gana Parishad in the 2026 Assam Legislative Assembly election. He polled 80,130 votes and defeated his nearest rival, Dilip Baruah of the Assam Jatiya Parishad, by a margin of 24,446 votes.
