= Abdul Batin Khandakar =

Indian politician

Member of Assam Legislative Assembly
- Incumbent
- Assumed office 21 May 2021
- Preceded by: Abdul Hai Nagori
- Constituency: Abhayapuri North

Personal details
- Party: Indian National Congress
- Profession: Politician

Abdul Batin Khandakar is an Indian politician from Assam. He was elected to the Assam Legislative Assembly from Abhayapuri North in the 2021 Assam Legislative Assembly election as a member of the Indian National Congress.

== Early life and education ==
He is the son of Ibrahim Ali Khandakar. He completed his Bachelor of Engineering (civil) from Visveswaraya Regional College of Engineering under Nagpur University.
