= Prakash Chandra Das (Assam politician) =

Indian politician (born 1974)

Prakash Chandra Das (born 1974) is an Indian politician from the northeastern state of Assam. He is first time member of the Assam Legislative Assembly from the Hajo–Sualkuchi Assembly constituency, which is reserved for Scheduled Caste community from 2026, in Kamrup district representing the Asom Gana Parishad.

== Early life ==
Das is from Hajo Sualuchi, Kamrup district, Assam. He is the son of the late Phanidhar Das. He completed his Bachelor of Arts at a college affiliated with Rabindranath Tagore University, Bhopal, Madhya Pradesh and passed in the year 2020. He runs his own business and declared assets worth Rs. 48 lakhs in his affidavit to the Election Commission of India.

== Career ==
Das won the Hajo–Sualkuchi Assembly constituency representing the Asom Gana Parishad in the 2026 Assam Legislative Assembly election. He polled 81,699 votes and defeated his nearest rival, Nandita Das of the Indian National Congress, by a margin of 794 votes.
