= Dangtola =

Village in Indian state of Assam

Dangtola (or Dangtol) is a village in the Chirang district of the north eastern state of Assam.

== Geography ==
It is 2 kilometres from New Bongaigaon and around 170 kilometres from Guwahati city. It falls under the Sidli revenue circle. The village is located 125 kilometres east of the India-Bangladesh border. The nearest road is by NH31, roughly 10 kilometres away. Small rivers such as Kujiya River flow through the area. The area covers 24121 hectares. It has a forest cover of nearly 12.3% of its total area.

== Economy ==
The major source of income is agriculture and small business.

Agriculture constitutes nearly 80% of the local economy. Crops include wheat, oil seeds and pulses. Nearly 50% of the land is utilized for agricultural activities.

== Dangtola railway station ==
Dangtola railway station is 2 km from New Bongaigaon Station. It is part of the Northeast Frontier Railway Zone of the Indian Railways. The station has one platform and few trains halt there, such as the New Bongaigaon-Siliguri Express and the Sifhung Passenger.
