= Satra Kanara =

Village in Assam, India

- Village
- Location within Assam Location within India
- Coordinates: 26°15′24″N 90°55′12″E
- Country: India
- State: Assam
- District: Barpeta
- Subdivision: Baghbor

Area
  - Total: 21.25 km^{2} (8.20 sq mi)
- Elevation: 40 m (130 ft)

Population (2011)
  - Total: 30,994
  - Density: 1,459/km^{2} (3,778/sq mi)

Languages
  - Local: Assamese
- Time zone: UTC+5:30 (IST)
- PIN: 781308
- Vehicle registration: AS-15

Satra Kanara is a village located in the Barpeta district of Assam, India. Sitting on the north bank of the Brahmaputra River, it is situated about 15 kilometres southwest of the district headquarter Barpeta. In the 2011 census, the village was recorded to have a population of 30,994.

== Geography ==
Satra Kanara is bournded by Beki River to the northwest and Brahmaputra River to the south. Its neighboring settlements are Koemari, Kanara, Niz Baghbar, and Balajan. The village sprawls across 2124.8 hectares of land.

== Demographics ==
Satra Kanara had a population of 30,994 in the year 2011, with 51.34% being male and 48.66% being female. About 31.00% of the population participated in the workforce. The literacy rate stood at 35.21%, with 40.51% of the male residents and 29.57% of the female residents being literate.
