= Jania Aubakirova =

Kazakhstani music educator and pianist

- Born: 19 April 1957 (age 68); Almaty, Kazakhstan
- Genres: Classical music
- Occupation(s): pianist, music teacher
- Instrument: piano
- Website: Official site

Jania Aubakirova (Kazakh: Жания Жақияқызы Әубәкірова; born 19 April 1957) is a Kazakhstani pianist. Jania Aubakirova is originally from Almaty, was born 19 April 1957, Kazakh pianist, professor, and former Rector of the Kazakh national conservatory. Jania Aubakhirova is a recipient of the Ordre des Arts et des Lettres and the Kazakhstan State Premium.

She was second to Stanislav Bunin at the 1983 Long-Thibaud Competition; she has performed internationally since. Aubakhirova is a recipient of the Ordre des Arts et des Lettres and the Kazakhstan State Premium. She is the Rector of the Kazakh National Conservatory since 1997.

== Autobiography ==
- Her father YakhiyaAubakirov (1925-2005), Kazakhstani economist. He was from Karakesk village and his tribe was Argyn.
- Sister- ZhanarAubakirov is the main Rector of the national university of the AbayKunanbaev, her specialty is an economist.
- Since 1982 year is the main teacher of the Kurmangazy conservatory.
- Since 1983 year was the solo singer of the Kazakh Zhambyl conservatory school.
- Since 1993 year has been the main professor of Almaty state conservatory.
- Since 1997 year to the 2001 year was the Rector of the Kurmangazy, in 2001 year the Conservatory had gained the status of the National by her.
- In 1998, made international exhibition was called ‘Classic’. She made an organization in the 18th countries, made approximately 30 discs, more than 20 musical films about Kazakhstani screenwriters. Also, with the participation of her, some organizations were created.
- In 2001, was created an international organization which name is ‘United Stars’
- In 2002, the college of the name JaniaAubakirova
- In 2004, master's degree of ‘Arts Management’ which was dedicated to the education of the professional managers whose sphere was in the art and culture, and also international competition between professional pianists and modern music.

== Her profession ==
Zhania Aubakirova's concerts and performances with famous orchestras, promoting world musical classics and works of Kazakh composers, are regularly held in Kazakhstan, and also the largest concert halls in France, England, Germany, Japan, Russia, Poland, Italy, USA, Israel, Greece, Hungary. The pianist has performed in halls such as - Salle Pleyel, Salle Gaveau, Barbican Hall, Wigmore Hall, Vigoda Hall, Seoul's Arts Center, Keimyung Art Center, Berlin Philharmoniker, Berlin Konzerthaus, Kennedy Center, Carnegie Hall. She also performed in The Great Halls of the Moscow Tchaikovsky Conservatory and the St. Petersburg Philharmonic, the Moscow House of Music, etc. Zhania Aubakirova has collaborated with many famous musicians such as Martha Argerich, Valery Gergiev, Mikhail Pletnev, Alexander Vedernikov, David Geringas, Dorian Wilson, and others. As well as she collaborated with the Russian National Orchestra, the French Radio Symphony Orchestra, the Istanbul Philharmonic Orchestra, the English Chamber Orchestra, and many others. She annually conducts master classes in Kazakhstan and abroad. On the initiative of Zhania Aubakirova, the Music Agency "Classics" was organized in 1998, which, with great success, conducted many international projects: "Kazakh Seasons in France", "International Piano Competition in Almaty", "Rising Stars", "Dedication to the Piano", "Almaty International Piano Festival ”,“ Masterclasses of foreign professors ”, and also organized concerts in more than 50 countries of the world, recorded more than 30 CDs, more than 20 musical films about Kazakh performers. Also, Zhania Aubakirova has been the rector of the Kurmangazy Kazakh National Conservatory, since 1997. Under her leadership, the conservatory became the country's leading music university and cultural and educational center of the republic, in 2001 the conservatory was awarded National status. Among the implemented educational and educational initiatives of Zh.Aubakirova, founded in 1994, the "Author's School of Zhania Aubakirova", which works according to modern educational methods and technologies. According to the director of the state theater of opera and ballet "Astana Opera" Tolegen Mukhamedzhanov, Zhania Aubakirova adequately represents her people on the world stage. "Zhania Yakhiyaevna managed to create a personality out of herself, managed to create a great daughter of her people. She can adequately represent her people, the culture of her people. As a musician, I understand what colossal work is needed to play the piano. The piano is a male instrument because to play it, you need strength. But as a woman Zhania Yakhiyaevna mastered this instrument, I think it is worthy to be proud of it. She is a pianist with a capital letter ", - said Tolegen Mukhamedzhanov.

== Books ==
- “Вариации на тему” ("Variations on a Theme")
- “Слово об отце. Страницы памяти” (“Word about father. Memory Pages”)

== Family ==
Husband - Sapargaliev Galym Gabbasovich - Director of the Author's School Zhania Aubakirova. Sons- Almas and Alikhan. Senior - one of the developers of the program "Music and Mathematics", graduated from school with the sign "Altyn belgi". He was the captain of the school basketball team. Junior - is engaged in drawing.

== Awards and titles ==
- 1983-2nd Grand Prix and Special Prize for the best performance of works by contemporary French composers " at the International Marguerite Long-Jacques Thibault Competition in France.
- 1985-Grand Prix of the International Competition of Chamber Ensembles in France, in Paris, in collaboration with Gauhar Murzabekova.
- 1991-People's Artist of the Republic of Kazakhstan.
- 1998-Knight of the Order of Arts and Letters of France.
- 2001-winner of the independent award "Platinum Tarlan".
- 2002-laureate of the State Prize of the Republic of Kazakhstan.
- 2003-winner of the European Union of Arts named after Gustav Mahler.
- 2008-holder of the Order of Public Recognition "Catherine the Great" II degree "for strengthening friendship between Kazakhstan and Russia".
- 2008-Order "Parasat".
- 2009 badge "For services to Polish culture".
- She was awarded state and government medals of the Republic of Kazakhstan.
- 2011-Gold Cross of Merit Poland.
- 2012-State of Peace and Progress Award of the First President - Leader of the Nation.
- 2016-medals "25 years of independence of the Republic of Kazakhstan".
- 2018-Honorary citizen of the Shet district
