= Kalgachia =

- Village
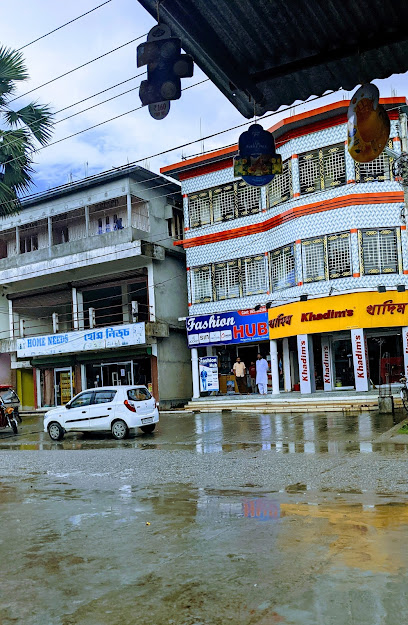

- Location in Assam, India Kalgachia (India)
- Coordinates: 26.36°N 91.86°E
- Country: India
- State: Assam
- Region: Lower Assam
- District: Barpeta
- Established: 16th Century

Government
  - Type: The provincial governing authority of Assam, as the state of India.

Population (2011)
  - Total: 6,304

Languages
  - Official: Assamese
- Time zone: UTC+5:30 (IST)
- PIN: 781319
- Vehicle registration: AS
- Website: barpeta.nic.in

Kalgachia is a sub-urban town in Barpeta district, Assam, India. It is 17.5 kilometres (10.9 mi) west of the district headquarters Barpeta.

== Demography ==
The total population is 6304 of which 3229 are males and 3075 females as per the 2011 census.

== Education ==
Nabajyoti College is a higher educational institution and BB college is another notable institute close to this town, G K Arabic College Madrassa is a higher educational institution in Kalgachia. There are many private institutions in this place. Ataur Rahman College of Education Epitome Computer Institute is the oldest and only certified computer education establishment and A large number of good quality English Medium Schools are Al-Ameen Academy. K.K.Pathak High School is one of the oldest schools in this town. A new college started (2018) named Ajmal College of Arts & Science. Kalgachia Commerce College is the only commerce college in this town but this college is shifted to Dewkura. There is only one private institution of commerce at present which is Wisdom Academy Kalgachia (a Junior College of Commerce). It has been established only for women's education at Lokpriya Girls College, located in Dimapur. Some private sector schools in this town are Radiance Academy and Royal Global English School, KPS public school, Royal institute of science, Dolphin English medium school, IRM School Of Excellence. Fakaruddin Ali Ahmed Junior College, Eden Academy and Assam Techno School., NE School of Nursing kalgachia, Iqra public school, Ajmal Super40 (for NEET&JEE) is another notable institute of kalgachia which is established in 2024 for those who are aspiring to be doctor and engineer.

== Transport and communication ==
Kalgachia is located 14 kilometres (8.7 mi) south of National Highway 27 and is connected by road to Sarbhog and other nearby towns. The nearest railway stations are Sorbhog railway station and Barpeta Road railway station. The nearest airport is Lokpriya Gopinath Bordoloi International Airport in Guwahati. The completion of a new bridge over the Beki River in 2019 improved road connections between Kalgachia and Barpeta. Kalgachia became an administrative circle in 2024. Government facilities in the town include a civil hospital, police station, fire station, sub-registrar's office, and Public Works Department office.

== Notable people ==
- Fakhruddin Ali Ahmed, former president of India
- Abdul Khalek M.P , former MP of the Indian Parliament and former MLA of Assam Legislative Assembly
- Rafiqul Islam, MLA of Assam Legislative Assembly
