= Diptimayee Choudhury =

Indian politician

Member of Assam Legislative Assembly
- Incumbent
- Assumed office 13 November 2024
- Preceded by: Phani Bhusan Choudhury
- Constituency: Bongaigaon

Personal details
- Party: Asom Gana Parishad
- Profession: Politician

Diptimayee Choudhury (born 1961) is an Indian politician from Assam. She is a member of the Assam Legislative Assembly from Bongaigaon constituency representing the Asom Gana Parishad.

== Early life and education ==
Choudhury is from Bongaigaon, Assam. She passed Class 12 at Barnagar College in 1980. She married Phani Bhusan Choudhary, who is the Lok Sabha MP from Barpeta constituency. She is a retired teacher.

== Career ==
Choudhury was first elected as an MLA in the bypoll in 2024 and retained the seat for AGP in the 2026 Assam Legislative Assembly election. In 2026, she polled 72,247 votes and defeated her nearest rival, Girish Baruah of the Indian National Congress, by a margin of 24,998 votes.

== See also ==
- List of chief ministers of Assam
- Assam Legislative Assembly
