= Jania, Barpeta district =

Jania is a Satra holding village in Barpeta District, Assam, India. The village is located 10 km far (west) from District headquarters Barpeta and 100 km far from State capital Guwahati. It is said that Srimanta Sankardeva named the village as Ejoniya (single opinion) which was derived to Jania by one mouth to another as passing time.

== Population ==
The village carries total 1263 families and it has population of 6468 of which 3353 are males while 3115 are females as per Population Census 2011. The village literacy rate of Jania village is 53.96% compared to 72.19% of Assam where Male literacy stands at 60.71% and female literacy rate was 46.65%.

== Education ==
There are four government-run lower primary schools and two upper primary schools in the village. Other private schools include Fakharuddin Ali Ahmed Memorial College, Dapon Jatiya Vidyalaya, Jania High School, Jania Anchalik Sr Madrasa, and Banglipara High madrasa.

== Satra ==
Jania satra was built by the grandson of mahapurush Narayan Das Thakur Ata and the satra is one of the main attractions of this village.

== Politics ==
Jania is the center place of the 44 Jania LAC which is one of the prestigious Assembly constituency because Fakhruddin Ali Ahmed was started his political journey from this constituency and later become the President of India.
