= Jania Assembly constituency =

Assembly constituency of Assam

Coordinates: 26.33°N 90.92°E

Jania
- Former constituency No. 44 for the Assam Legislative Assembly

Constituency details
- Country: India
- Region: Northeast India
- State: Assam
- District: Barpeta
- Lok Sabha constituency: Barpeta
- Established: 1957
- Abolished: 2023
- Reservation: None

Jania was one of the 126 electoral constituencies of Assam Legislative Assembly in India. Jania formed part of the Barpeta Lok Sabha constituency. This constituency was abolished in 2023.

== Members of the Legislative Assembly ==
- 1957: Fakhruddin Ali Ahmed, Indian National Congress
- 1962: Fakhruddin Ali Ahmed, Indian National Congress
- 1972: Ataur Rahman, Indian National Congress
- 1978: Abdus Sobhan, Indian National Congress (Indira)
- 1983: Abdus Sobhan, Independent
- 1985: A. F. Golam Osmani, UMF
- 1991: Asahaque Ali, Independent
- 1996: Abdur Rouf, UMF
- 2001: Asahaque Ali, Indian National Congress
- 2006: Abdul Khaleque (Assamese politician), Indian National Congress
- 2011: Rafiqul Islam, All India United Democratic Front
- 2016: Abdul Khaleque (Assamese politician), Indian National Congress
- 2019 by-election: Rafiqul Islam, All India United Democratic Front

Election	Name	Party
2021	Rafiqul Islam	All India United Democratic Front

== Election results ==
=== 2016 ===
2016 Assam Legislative Assembly election: Jania
Party	Candidate	Votes	%	±%
INC	Abdul Khaleque	86,930	56.40	
AIUDF	Rafiqul Islam	57,194	37.10	
BJP	Benazir Arfan	6,067	3.93	
CPI(M)	Mainul Hoque	1,976	1.28	
RSC	Amir Hussain	769	0.49	
RJP	Md. Sultan Mahmud	506	0.32	
NOTA	None of the above	689	0.44	
Majority		29,736	19.30	
Turnout		1,54,131	88.88	
Registered electors		1,73,410		
INC gain from AIUDF		Swing		
