= Bongaigaon district =

- District of Assam
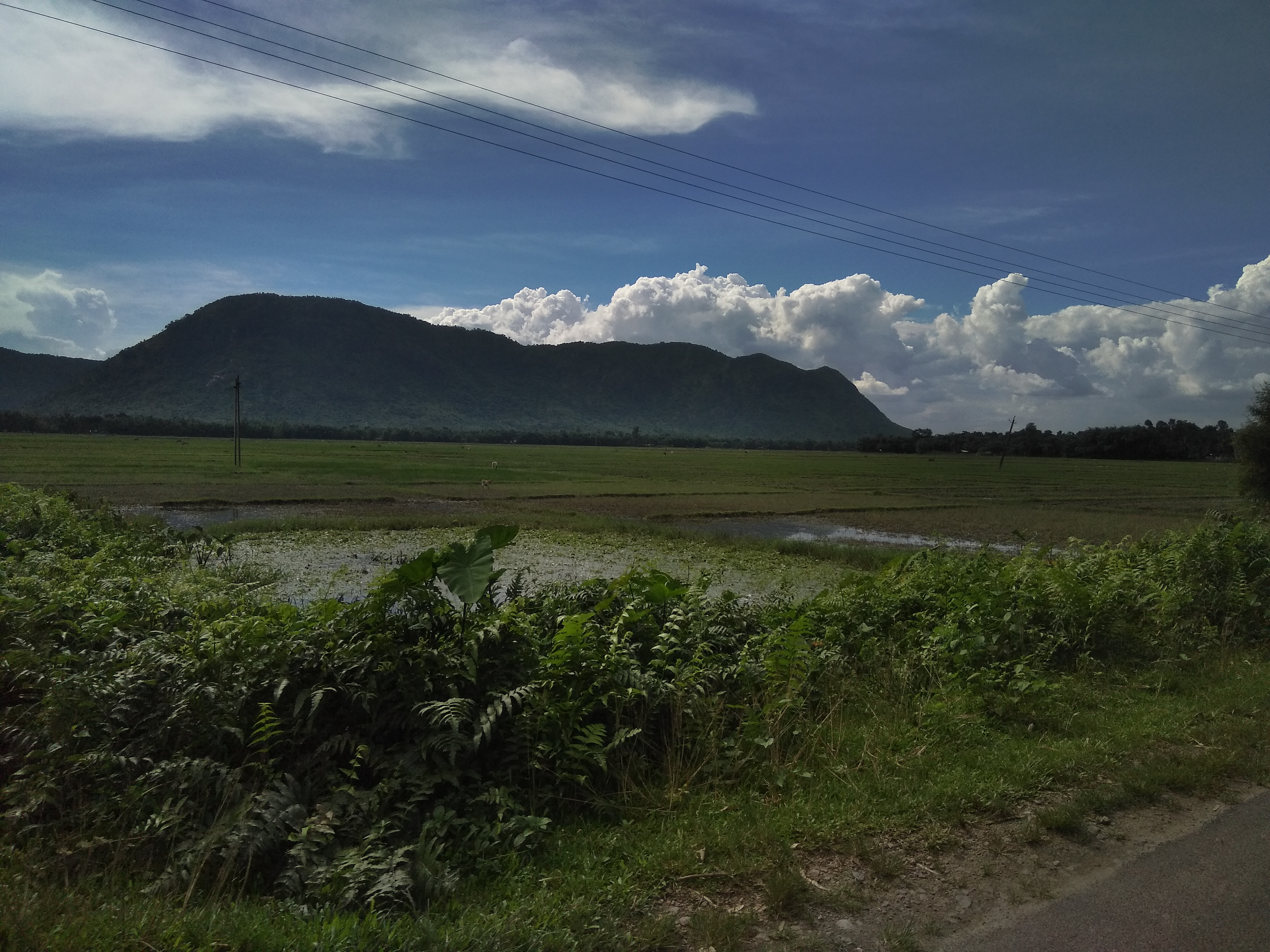
- Bhumeshwar Hill
- Interactive map of Bongaigaon district
- Coordinates: 26.4667°N 90.5667°E
- Country: India
- State: Assam
- Division: Lower Assam
- Headquarters: Bongaigaon

Government
  - Lok Sabha constituencies: Barpeta (shared with Barpeta district)
  - Vidhan Sabha constituencies: Bongaigaon, Abhayapuri North, Abhayapuri South
  - District Commissioner: Shri Lakhinandan Saharia, ACS
  - Senior Superintendent of Police: Shri Numal Mahatta, APS

Area
  - Total: 1,093 km^{2} (422 sq mi)

Population (2011)
  - Total: 738,804
  - Density: 675.9/km^{2} (1,751/sq mi)

Demographics
  - Literacy: 69.74%
  - Sex ratio: 966
- Time zone: UTC+05:30 (IST)
- ISO 3166 code: IN-AS
- Website: bongaigaon.assam.gov.in

Bongaigaon district (/bɒŋaɪɡæ̃ʊ/) is an administrative district in the state of Assam in northeastern India. The district headquarters are located at Bongaigaon. The district has a Muslim-majority population according to the 2011 Census of India.

== Etymology ==
The name Bongaigaon has been associated with more than one explanation. One explanation connects the name with the Aie River and its alluvial deposits. A low-lying area raised by riverine sand, pebbles and debris carried by recurrent floods was called “Bang”, described as an Indo-Mongoloid word corresponding to “Bam” in Assamese. The term referred to an artificially raised highland suitable for habitation and cultivation. The combination of “Bang” and “Aie” is explained as “Bangai”, which eventually came to be pronounced as “Bongai” and developed into “Bongaigaon.”

This explanation was arrived at during a public meeting held on 27 July 2013, organised by the Bongaigaon Sanskritic Manch, in the presence of leading citizens, historians and scholars of the locality. The linguistic association of Bang/Bam may also be considered in the historical context of the Koch people, whose traditional language belongs to the broader Tibeto-Burman linguistic sphere of the region.

Another traditional explanation derives the name from “Bon” (wild) and “Gai” (cow), referring to the presence of wild cattle in the surrounding hills and forests. According to this tradition, wild cattle were once a menace to villagers and were driven away to protect crops, giving rise to the name Bon-Gai-Gaon.

== History ==
=== Duars ===
Bongaigaon district fell under Eastern Dooars. Dooars between Sankosh River and Manas River are called Eastern Dooars.

=== Under the Kingdom of Bhutan ===
From early 17th-century some parts of present-day Bongaigaon district was under the control of Kingdom of Bhutan, till the Duar Wars in 1865 when British removed the Bhutanese influence and later the areas were merged to undivided Goalpara district of the Indian Union in 1949.

=== Koch dynasty ===
The district was part of Kamrup. In the 14th century, its rule was passed onto the Baro-Bhuyans. Later in the 1580s Nara Narayan of the Kamata kingdom conquered the area and it subsequently became the fiefdom of the Bijni family, who were descendants of Nara Narayan. When the Kamata kingdom split into Koch Bihar and Koch Hajo due to rivalry between the king and his nephew Raghu Rai, Bongaigaon became part of Koch Hajo. Soon Koch Hajo and Koch Bihar went to war, and the Mughal Nawab of Dhaka, supporting Koch Bihar, defeated Rai at Dhubri in 1602. Rai's son Parikshit signed a peace treaty, but hostilities resumed in 1614 and Parikshit was driven back to modern-day Guwahati, where he surrendered and soon after died. His son, Bijit Narayan, was made Zamindar of the region between the Manas and Sankosh: from him the Bijni family descended. Koch Hajo was tributary to the Mughals, but in the last decades of the 17th century Mughal influence waned significantly due to the Ahom-Mughal wars in which the Ahoms were eventually successful. Koch Hajo, including Bijni Zamindari, fell under Ahom influence.

=== Present ===
The district of Bongaigaon was created on 29 September 1989 from parts of Goalpara and Kokrajhar districts. 2004 saw a loss of size when part of the district was split to make Chirang district.

In the late 1750s, the East India Company strengthened their influence in Bengal and Lower Assam. In 1822 the East India Company created Goalpara district containing present-day Lower Assam, the Garo Hills and northeastern Rangpur division in Bangladesh. The Bijnis continued to pay tribute to the British, and even gained a small amount of land after the Duar War in 1865. Rangpur and the Garo Hills were eventually stripped away to form different districts, but Goalpara continued to be administered as part of a Cooch Behar province. Eventually the Assam Valley province was founded in 1874, and Goalpara was moved to it. Goalpara was later divided into various districts including Kokrajhar and Dhubri, and later Bongaigaon.

== Geography ==
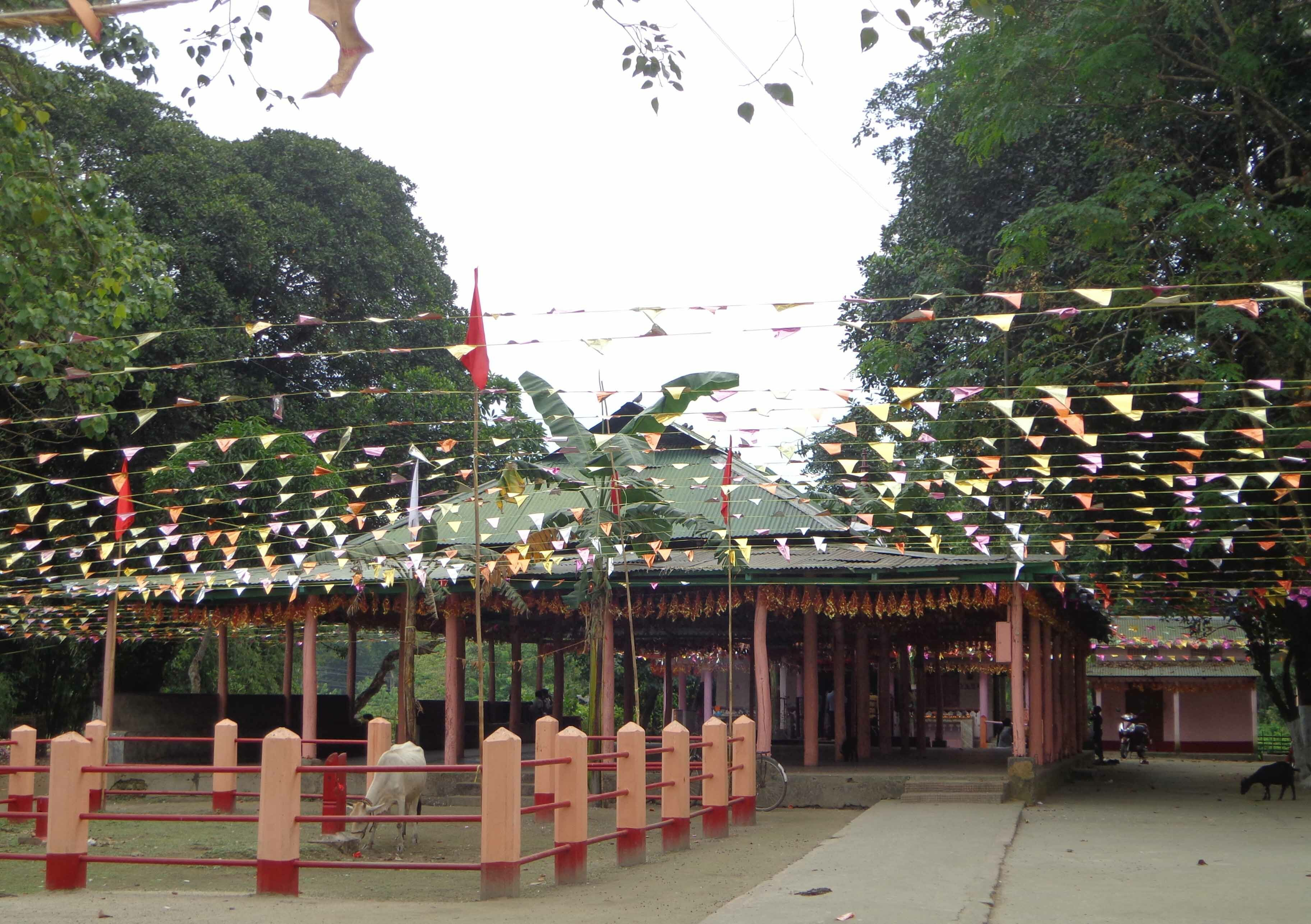
Bagheswari Temple

Bongaigaon district occupies an area of 1,093 square kilometres (422 sq mi), comparatively equivalent to Réunion. Bongaigaon district is surrounded by Barpeta in the east, the Brahmaputra in the south and Kokrajhar in the north and west corner and share international border with Bhutan in the north. Bongaigaon District shares it's boundary with Chirang, Barpeta, Kokrajhar, Dhubri and Goalpara districts of the state.

The places that are worth visiting in Bongaigaon are Eco-park, Bagheswari temple, Rajbhavan of Rani Abhayaswari, Nigomghola, Kakoijana Reserved Forest, Koya Kujia Lake cum Eco Park, Tea gardens, Naakkati (Cutting Nose) Hills, Tamarannga Beel (Lake), Rock Cut Cave (Jogighopa), Panchapur Borjhora Waterfall, Bagheswari Hill View Point, Lalmati Duramari Ganesh Mandir, Bhairabsura Hill, Sri Sri Maa Maharani Devi Temple, and Suryapahar. The history of Bagheswari temple is such that once a priest saw in his dream that Maa Bagheswari asked him to go to a particular place where if he digs out he will find a sword that belonged to Maa Bagheswari. And the next morning when the priest went to dig in the place he saw in his dreams, he found the sword. After that day a temple was built over the place and there they worship the sword. There is no idol inside the temple.

== Economy ==
In 2006 the Indian government named Bongaigaon one of the country's 250 most backward districts (out of a total of 640). It is one of the eleven districts in Assam currently receiving funds from the Backward Regions Grant Fund Programme (BRGF).

== Divisions ==
The district has 1 subdivision and 1 Co-District: Bongaigaon Sadar and North Salmara (Abhayapuri). It has 5 Revenue Circles (RC) namely Bongaigaon, Boitamari, Dangtol, Srijangram and Manikpur and 5 Community Development (CD) Blocks namely Dangtol, Boitamari, Tapattary, Srijangram and Manikpur. The district has 563 Villages and 65 Gram Panchayats. In 2004, parts of the Bongaigaon district (mainly areas under Bijni subdivision) were given over to form the Chirang district, under the Bodoland Territorial Council (BTC), with its district headquarters at Kajalgaon.

There are four Assam Legislative Assembly constituencies in this district: Bongaigaon, Bijni, Abhayapuri North, and Abhayapuri South. The latter is designated for scheduled castes. Bijni is in the Kokrajhar Lok Sabha constituency, whilst the other three are in the Barpeta Lok Sabha constituency.

== Demographics ==
According to the 2011 census, the total population of the district is 738,804, out of which 375,818 are males while 362,986 are females. The average sex ratio is 966. The average literacy rate in urban areas is 87.4% while that in the rural areas is 66.4%. The total literacy rate of Bongaigaon district is 69.74%. The male literacy rate is 63.09% and the female literacy rate is 54.26% in Bongaigaon district. 14.86% of the population lives in urban areas. Scheduled Castes and Scheduled Tribes made up 11.21% and 2.55% of the population respectively.

=== Religion ===
Religion in Bongaigaon district (2011)
1. Islam (50.2%)
2. Hinduism (48.4%)
3. Others (1.34%)

The district religious composition are as follows: Hindu 359,145, Muslim 371,033, Christian 5,924, Sikh 384, Buddhist 236, Jain 871 as per 2011 census report. Way back in 1971, Hindus were slight majority in Bongaigaon district with forming 69.8% of the population, while Muslims were 27.8% at that time.

Population of circles by religion
Circle	Muslims	Hindus	Others
Bongaigaon (Pt)	6.99%	89.80%	3.21%
Boitamari	69.00%	29.96%	1.04%
Srijangram	66.10%	33.51%	0.39%
Sidli (Pt)	39.43%	58.98%	1.59%
Bijni (Pt)	55.99%	43.77%	0.24%

=== Languages ===
Languages of Bongaigaon district (2011)
1. Assamese (48.5%)
2. Bengali (43.4%)
3. Hindi (3.06%)
4. Kamtapuri (1.45%)
5. Boro (1.13%)
6. Others (2.50%)

According to the 2011 census, 48.51% of the population spoke Assamese, 43.35% Bengali, 3.06% Hindi, 1.45% Kamtapuri and 1.13% Boro as their first language.
