= Gunindra Nath Das =

Indian politician

Gunindra Nath Das is an Asom Gana Parishad politician from Assam, India. He has been elected in Assam Legislative Assembly election in 2006 and 2016 from Barpeta constituency.
