= Kumar Deepak Das =

Indian politician

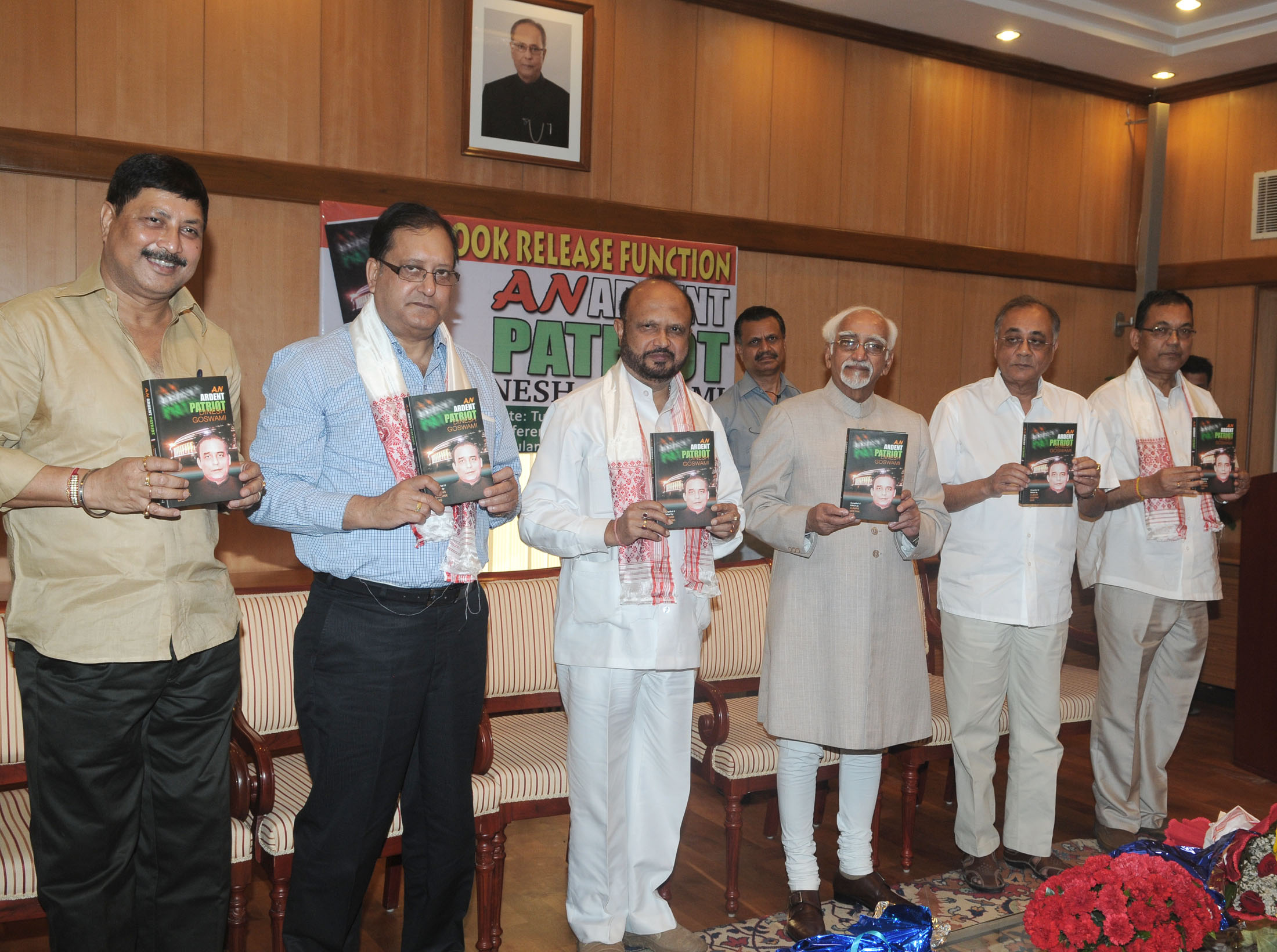

Member of Parliament, Rajya Sabha
- In office June 15, 2007 – June 14, 2013
- Preceded by: Indramoni Bora
- Succeeded by: Santiuse Kujur
- Constituency: Assam

Personal details
- Born: 9 August 1958 (age 67) Bijni, Chirang district
- Party: Asom Gana Parishad
- Spouse: Gitima Lekharu Das
- Children: Two daughters
- Education: B.Sc., LL.B.
- Alma mater: Gauhati University
- Profession: Artist, Journalist/Writer, Lawyer/Advocate, Musician, Political and Social Worker, Sportsperson and Sports Organiser

Kumar Deepak Das, a politician from Asom Gana Parishad party, and a former Member of the Parliament of India representing Assam in the Rajya Sabha, the upper house of the Parliament. He served as Minister of state in cultural affairs in his last term as MLA in the year 1985. He is a writer, singer and actor.

He was born in 1958 in a small town Bijni in Chirang district of Assam to Ramani Mohan Das and Ganga Priya Das. He completed his school from Bijni Bandhab High School. He did his +2 from Arya College, Guwahati. He earned his bachelor in science degree from Madhav Choudhury College in Barpeta (also his constituency) with honors. He completed his LLB from Gauhati University. He has authored many books like Mahanagaror Kanthaswar, Mahuror Pare-Pare (based on Dimasa culture), Jibanir Madhuri, Bibhinna Dinar Chinta, Bhikshowar Choka Toruwal.

His latest writing includes Fearless Democrat: Hem Barua and An Ardent Patriot: Dinesh Goswami. His recent book was released by the Vice- President of India Mohammad Hamid Ansari. His book Fearless Democrat: Hem Barua is a collection of speeches by Hem Barua during his times. In his forward note, Mr. Das says that this book will help the youths of India to guide themselves towards the way to serve the nation. Rather than a politician he admits himself to a social worker who loves to work for people.

He is married to Geetima Lekharu Das, a teacher in Assamese literature with two daughters. He also served as chairman of Assam State Film Finance, Guwahati in 1996. During his tenure as Member of Parliament of the Upper House of Parliament, he holds the record of the highest standing number of questions of 16 hours and 53 minutes in a record among the other Members. He is titled as "Bir Purush" by his well-wishers, for his shown courage in his tenure.
