= Silchar Assembly constituency =

Constituency of the Assam legislative assembly in India

Silchar
- Constituency No. 118 for the Assam Legislative Assembly
- 118-Silchar within Cachar district

Constituency details
- Country: India
- Region: Northeast India
- State: Assam
- Division: Barak Valley
- District: Cachar
- Lok Sabha constituency: Silchar
- Established: 1951
- Total electors: 213,230 (2026)
- Reservation: None

Member of Legislative Assembly
- 16th Assam Legislative Assembly
- Incumbent Dr. Rajdeep Roy
- Party: BJP
- Alliance: NDA
- Elected year: 2026
- Preceded by: Dipayan Chakraborty (BJP)

Silchar Assembly constituency is one of the 126 state legislative assembly constituencies in Assam, India. It is one of the seven assembly segments that constitute the Silchar Lok Sabha constituency. Since 2026, it has been represented by Dr. Rajdeep Roy of the Bharatiya Janata Party.

Established in 1951, the constituency had its boundaries redrawn during the 2023 delimitation exercise. The reconstituted constituency now includes 32 wards of Silchar city and several other rural areas of Cachar district.

Most successful political parties from Silchar Assembly constituency since 1952
1. BJP (7 times) (41.2%)
2. INC (7 times) (41.2%)
3. IND (2 times) (11.8%)
4. CPI(M) (1 time) (5.88%)

== Local self-governed segments ==
Silchar Assembly constituency is composed of the following local self-governed segments:

- Silchar Municipal Corporation
  - 32 wards
- Borkhola Development Block
  - Badarpur Masimpur Gram Panchayat
- Salchapra Development Block
  - Krishnapur Bhairabnagar Gram Panchayat
  - Buribail Gram Panchayat
  - Kumarpara Niz Joynagar Gram Panchayat
  - Rajnagar Gram Panchayat
  - Srikona Gram Panchayat
- Silchar Development Block
- Sonai Development Block
  - Uttar Krishnapur Gram Panchayat

== Members of the Legislative Assembly ==
Following is the list of members representing Silchar Assembly constituency in Assam Legislature:

Election	Member	Political Party
As Silchar
2026	Dr. Rajdeep Roy	Bharatiya Janata Party
2021	Dipayan Chakraborty	Bharatiya Janata Party
2016	Dilip Kumar Paul	Bharatiya Janata Party
2014^	Dilip Kumar Paul	Bharatiya Janata Party
2011	Sushmita Dev	Indian National Congress
2006	Bhitika Dev	Indian National Congress
2001	Bimalangshu Roy	Bharatiya Janata Party
1996	Bimalangshu Roy	Bharatiya Janata Party
1991	Samarendra Nath Sen	Bharatiya Janata Party
1985	Karnendu Bhattacharjee	Indian National Congress
1983	Jagdish Chandra Choudhury	Indian National Congress
1978	Nurul Huda	Communist Party of India
1972	Mohitosh Purkayastha	Indian National Congress
1967	Satindra Mohon Dev	Indian National Congress
As Silchar West
1962	Nanda Kishore Singh	Independent politician
1957	Jyotsna Chanda	Indian National Congress
As Silchar
1952	Mehrab Ali Laskar	Independent politician

- ^ bye-election

== Election results ==
Vote share of Winning candidates
2026	64.09%
2021	56.17%
2016	60.53%
2014 (by-poll)	58.37%
2011	50.34%
2006	45.97%
2001	48.93%
1996	43.41%
1991	42.07%
1985	47.90%
1983	50.51%
1978	44.64%
1972	77.97%
1967	43.67%
1962	41.97%
1957	55.37%
1952	23.03%

=== 2026 ===
2026 Assam Legislative Assembly election: Silchar
Party	Candidate	Votes	%	±%
BJP	Dr. Rajdeep Roy	110,758	64.09	▲7.92
INC	Abhijit Paul	56,761	32.85	▼1.90
NOTA	None of the above	3,002	1.74	▲0.94
Margin of victory		53,997	31.25	▲9.83
Turnout		172,875	81.07	▲6.15
Registered electors		213,230		▼9.19
BJP hold		Swing		

=== 2021 ===
2021 Assam Legislative Assembly election: Silchar
Party	Candidate	Votes	%	±%
BJP	Dipayan Chakraborty	98,558	56.17	▼4.36
INC	Tamal Kanti Banik	60,980	34.75	▼0.28
Independent	Dilip Kumar Paul	11,254	6.41	New entry
NOTA	None of the above	1,398	0.80	▲0.08
Margin of victory		37,578	21.42	▼4.08
Turnout		175,930	74.92	▼0.22
Registered electors		234,821		▲12.67
BJP hold		Swing		

=== 2016 ===
2016 Assam Legislative Assembly election: Silchar
Party	Candidate	Votes	%	±%
BJP	Dilip Kumar Paul	94,787	60.53	▲2.16
INC	Bithika Dev	54,867	35.03	▲5.84
CPI(M)	Supriya Bhattacharjee	1,961	1.25	▼0.62
NOTA	None of the above	1,143	0.72	▼0.03
Margin of victory		39,920	25.50	▼3.68
Turnout		156,594	75.14	▲12.57
Registered electors		208,409		▲0.89
BJP hold		Swing		

=== 2014 by-election ===
By-poll to Silchar constituency had been necessitated as the seat was vacated by the incumbent MLA, Sushmita Dev, who contested the elections to the Lok Sabha earlier that year and got elected.

2014 Assam Legislative Assembly By-election: Silchar
Party	Candidate	Votes	%	±%
BJP	Dilip Kumar Paul	74,898	58.37	▲20.88
INC	Arun Dutta Mazumder	37,457	29.19	▼20.70
AIUDF	Nur Ahmed Barbhuiyan	11,203	8.73	▼8.09
CPI(M)	Dulal Mitra	2,401	1.87	▼3.29
NOTA	None of the above	963	0.75	New entry
Margin of victory		37,441	29.18	▲16.10
Turnout		129,254	62.57	▲0.48
Registered electors		206,573		▲5.87
BJP gain from INC		Swing	▲20.79	

=== 2011 ===
2011 Assam Legislative Assembly election: Silchar
Party	Candidate	Votes	%	±%
INC	Sushmita Dev	60,978	50.34	▲4.37
BJP	Dr. Rajdeep Roy	45,127	37.25	▼5.07
CPI(M)	Parimal Kanti Paul	6,163	5.09	▲1.11
AGP	Fakrul Islam Mazumder	4,295	3.54	New entry
Margin of victory		15,851	13.08	▲9.42
Turnout		121,155	62.09	▲2.04
Registered electors		195,111		▼2.40
INC hold		Swing		

=== 2006 ===
2006 Assam Legislative Assembly election: Silchar
Party	Candidate	Votes	%	±%
INC	Bithika Dev	55,181	45.97	▼2.89
BJP	Bimalangshu Roy	50,789	42.32	▼6.61
CPI(M)	Dulal Mitra	4,778	3.98	New entry
SP	Imdad Hussain Laskar	3,405	2.84	▲2.62
Margin of victory		4,392	3.66	▲3.58
Turnout		120,048	60.05	▲0.37
Registered electors		199,908		▲26.75
INC gain from BJP		Swing	▲4.75	

=== 2001 ===
2001 Assam Legislative Assembly election: Silchar
Party	Candidate	Votes	%	±%
BJP	Bimalangshu Roy	45,308	48.93	▲5.52
INC	Kamalendu Bhattacharjee	45,237	48.86	▲7.01
CPI	Rafique Ahmed	1,192	1.29	New entry
Margin of victory		71	0.08	▼1.48
Turnout		94,132	59.68	▼11.08
Registered electors		157,722		▲9.10
BJP hold		Swing		

=== 1996 ===
1996 Assam Legislative Assembly election: Silchar
Party	Candidate	Votes	%	±%
BJP	Bimalangshu Roy	42,293	43.41	▲1.34
INC	Kamalendu Bhattacharjee	40,774	41.85	▲15.32
CPI(M)	Dulal Mitra	10,660	10.94	▼10.24
Margin of victory		1,519	1.56	▼13.98
Turnout		102,296	70.76	▼2.23
Registered electors		144,566		▲13.59
BJP hold		Swing		

=== 1991 ===
1991 Assam Legislative Assembly election: Silchar
Party	Candidate	Votes	%	±%
BJP	Samarendra Nath Sen	37,493	42.07	▲12.63
INC	Karnendu Bhattacharjee	23,642	26.53	▼21.37
CPI(M)	Dulal Mitra	18,877	21.18	▲8.56
AGP	Bijoy Krishna Nath	3,729	4.18	New entry
Margin of victory		13,851	15.54	▼2.92
Turnout		92,902	72.99	▲1.16
Registered electors		127,273		▲17.46
BJP gain from INC		Swing	▲17.00	

=== 1985 ===
1985 Assam Legislative Assembly election: Silchar
Party	Candidate	Votes	%	±%
INC	Karnendu Bhattacharjee	34,987	47.90	▼2.61
BJP	Kabindra Purkayastha	21,501	29.44	New entry
CPI(M)	Gopen Roy	9,219	12.62	▼0.51
Margin of victory		13,486	18.46	▼8.81
Turnout		77,838	71.83	▲9.31
Registered electors		108,358		▲17.53
INC hold		Swing		

=== 1983 ===
1983 Assam Legislative Assembly election: Silchar
Party	Candidate	Votes	%	±%
INC	Jagdish Chandra Choudhury	28,073	50.51	▲40.34
Independent	A. K. Nurul Haque	12,917	23.24	New entry
CPI(M)	Nurul Huda	7,296	13.13	▼31.51
Margin of victory		15,156	27.27	▲14.63
Turnout		57,644	62.52	▲0.87
Registered electors		92,195		▲22.14
INC gain from CPI(M)		Swing	▲35.92	

=== 1978 ===
1978 Assam Legislative Assembly election: Silchar
Party	Candidate	Votes	%	±%
CPI(M)	Nurul Huda	20,409	44.64	▲24.42
JP	Kabindra Purkayastha	14,628	31.99	New entry
INC	Karnendu Bhattacharjee	4,648	10.17	▼67.80
INC(I)	Shams Uddin Ahmed	3,629	7.94	New entry
Margin of victory		5,781	12.64	▼44.11
Turnout		46,538	61.65	▲14.63
Registered electors		75,483		▲20.59
CPI(M) gain from INC		Swing	▲46.11	

=== 1972 ===
1972 Assam Legislative Assembly election: Silchar
Party	Candidate	Votes	%	±%
INC	Mohitosh Purkayastha	22,283	77.97	▲34.30
CPI(M)	A. K. Bhattacharjee	6,065	21.22	New entry
Independent	Harendra Chandra Paul	231	0.81	New entry
Margin of victory		16,218	56.75	▲46.41
Turnout		29,428	47.02	▼17.91
Registered electors		62,592		▲22.29
INC hold		Swing		

=== 1967 ===
1967 Assam Legislative Assembly election: Silchar
Party	Candidate	Votes	%	±%
INC	Satindra Mohon Dev	13,407	43.67	▲24.57
Independent	T. Bhattacharjee	10,234	33.33	New entry
Independent	B. Bhowal	3,845	12.52	New entry
ABJS	K. Bhattacharjee	1,301	4.24	New entry
Margin of victory		3,173	10.34	▼12.53
Turnout		33,232	64.93	▼3.23
Registered electors		51,185		▼1.95
INC gain from Independent		Swing	▲33.27	

=== 1962 ===
1962 Assam Legislative Assembly election: Silchar West
Party	Candidate	Votes	%	±%
Independent	Nanda Kishore Singh	14,240	41.97	New entry
INC	Mohitosh Purkayastha	6,481	19.10	▼36.27
Independent	Lutfur Rahman	6,355	18.73	New entry
CPI	Achinta Kumar Bhattacharjee	5,698	16.79	▼27.84
Margin of victory		7,757	22.87	▲12.12
Turnout		35,584	68.16	▲14.91
Registered electors		52,205		▼4.01
Independent gain from INC		Swing	▲39.12	

=== 1957 ===
1957 Assam Legislative Assembly election: Silchar West
Party	Candidate	Votes	%	±%
INC	Jyotsna Chanda	16,036	55.37	▲32.59
CPI	Achinta Kumar Bhattacharjee	12,923	44.63	▲26.03
Margin of victory		3,113	10.75	▲10.50
Turnout		28,959	53.25	▲8.66
Registered electors		54,384		▲31.95
INC gain from Independent		Swing	▲27.81	

=== 1952 ===
1952 Assam Legislative Assembly election: Silchar
Party	Candidate	Votes	%	±%
Independent	Mehrab Ali Laskar	4,232	23.03	New entry
INC	Jyotsna Chanda	4,186	22.78	New entry
CPI	Achinta Kumar Bhattacharjee	3,418	18.60	New entry
KMPP	Satindra Mohon Dev	3,327	18.10	New entry
Independent	Dalip Kumar Chakravarty	1,660	9.03	New entry
ABJS	Biresh R. Acharyya	1,226	6.67	New entry
Margin of victory		46	0.25	——
Turnout		18,377	44.59	——
Registered electors		41,215		——
Independent win (new seat)				

== See also ==
- Hailakandi Assembly constituency
- Lumding Assembly constituency
- Hojai Assembly constituency
- Katigorah Assembly constituency
- Ram Krishna Nagar Assembly constituency
- Bijni Assembly constituency
- Patharkandi Assembly constituency
- Borkhola Assembly constituency
- Dholai Assembly constituency
