= Elections in Assam =

Indian state elections

Elections in Assam are conducted since 1952 to elect the members of the Assam Legislative Assembly and for the members of the Lok Sabha. There are 126 assembly constituencies and 14 Lok Sabha constituencies. The next Assam Assembly elections are due in 2031.

Location of Assam

== Legislative Assembly elections ==
The elections for the Assam Legislative Assembly held since 1952.

Year	Assembly	Winning party/Coalition	Chief Minister
1952	1st	Indian National Congress	Bishnu Ram Medhi
1957	2nd	Indian National Congress	B.P. Chaliha
1962	3rd	Indian National Congress	B.P. Chaliha
1967	4th	Indian National Congress	B.P. Chaliha; Mahendra Mohan Choudhury
1972	5th	Indian National Congress	Sarat Chandra Sinha
1978	6th	Janata Party; Indian National Congress	Golap Borbora (JP); Jogendra Nath Hazarika (JP); Anowara Taimur (INC); Keshab Chandra Gogoi (INC)
1983	7th	Indian National Congress	Hiteswar Saikia
1985	8th	Asom Gana Parishad	Prafulla Kumar Mahanta
1991	9th	Indian National Congress	Hiteswar Saikia; Bhumidhar Barman
1996	10th	Asom Gana Parishad	Prafulla Kumar Mahanta
2001	11th	Indian National Congress	Tarun Gogoi
2006	12th	Indian National Congress	Tarun Gogoi
2011	13th	Indian National Congress	Tarun Gogoi
2016	14th	Bharatiya Janata Party	Sarbananda Sonowal
2021	15th	Bharatiya Janata Party	Himanta Biswa Sarma
2026	16th	Bharatiya Janata Party	Himanta Biswa Sarma

== Lok Sabha Elections ==
Year	Lok Sabha	Party-wise Details
1951–52	1st Lok Sabha	Total: 10. INC: 9, SP:1
1957	2nd Lok Sabha	Total: 12. INC: 9, PSP:2, Independent: 1
1962	3rd Lok Sabha	Total: 12. INC: 9, PSP:2, HLC:1
1967	4th Lok Sabha	Total: 14. INC: 10, PSP:2, CPI: 1, AHL: 1
1971	5th Lok Sabha	Total: 14. INC: 13, AHL: 1
1977	6th Lok Sabha	Total: 14. INC: 10, Janata Party/BLD: 3, Independent: 1
1980	7th Lok Sabha	Total: 14. INC: 13, AHL: 1
1984	8th Lok Sabha	Total: 14. Independents: 8, INC: 4, ICS: 1, PTC: 1
1989	9th Lok Sabha	Elections not held due to security concerns
1991	10th Lok Sabha	Total: 14. INC: 8, AGP: 1, BJP: 2, CPI(M): 1, ADC: 1, Independent: 1
1996	11th Lok Sabha	Total: 14. INC: 5, AGP: 5, BJP: 1, CPI(M): 1, ASDC: 1, Independent: 1
1998	12th Lok Sabha	Total: 14. INC: 10, BJP: 1, ASDC: 1, UMFA :1, Independent: 1
1999	13th Lok Sabha	Total: 14. INC: 10, BJP: 2, CPI(ML): 1, Independent: 1
2004	14th Lok Sabha	Total: 14. INC: 9, AGP: 2, BJP: 2, Independent: 1
2009	15th Lok Sabha	Total: 14. INC: 7, BJP: 4, AGP: 1, AIUDF: 1, BPF: 1
2014	16th Lok Sabha	Total: 14. BJP: 7, INC: 3, AIUDF: 3, Independent: 1
2019	17th Lok Sabha	Total: 14. BJP: 9, INC: 3, AIUDF: 1, Independent: 1
2024	18th Lok Sabha	Total: 14. BJP: 9, INC: 3, AGP: 1, UPPL: 1
