= 1983 Assam Legislative Assembly election =

Legislative Assembly election in Assam, India

- 14–20 February 1983

114 seats in the Assam Legislative Assembly 58 seats needed for a majority
- Registered: 7,284,612
- Turnout: 32.74%
	Majority party	Minority party	Third party
		IC(S)	CPI(M)
Leader	Hiteswar Saikia	-	-
Party	INC	IC(S)	CPI(M)
Leader's seat	Nazira	-	-
Seats before	26	New	11
Seats won	91	4	2
Seat change	▲65	New	▼9
Percentage	52.53%	6.05%	5.14%
Swing	▲20.13pp	New	▼0.48pp
CM before election
President's Rule
Elected CM
Hiteswar Saikia
INC

Elections to the Assam Legislative Assembly were held in February 1983 to elect members of 114 constituencies in Assam, India. The Indian National Congress won the popular vote and a majority of seats and Hiteswar Saikia was appointed as the Chief Minister of Assam. The number of constituencies was set as 126 by the recommendation of the Delimitation Commission of India. The election had registered only 32.74% voting due to the boycott calls and threat of violence amidst the height of Assam agitation, and hence didn't have popular support.

== Result ==
Party	Votes	%	Seats	+/–
Indian National Congress	1,194,657	52.53	91	▲65
Indian Congress (Socialist)	137,685	6.05	4	New
Communist Party of India (Marxist)	116,923	5.14	2	▼9
Plain Tribals Council of Assam	106,084	4.66	1	▼3
Communist Party of India	58,746	2.58	1	▼4
Independents	659,995	29.02	10	▼5
Total	2,274,090	100.00	109	▼21
Valid votes	2,274,090	95.34		
Invalid/blank votes	111,100	4.66		
Total votes	2,385,190	100.00		
Registered voters/turnout	7,284,612	32.74		
Source: ECI

== Elected members ==
Constituency	Reserved for (SC/ST/None)	Member	Party
Ratabari	SC	Subal Chandra Das	Indian National Congress
Patharkandi	None	Mian Udddin	Independent
Karimganj North	None	Ketaki Prasad Dutta	Indian National Congress
Karimganj South	None	Abdul Muqtadir Choudhury	Indian National Congress
Badarpur	None	Gulam Subhany Choudhury	Indian National Congress
Hailakandi	None	Abdul Muhib Mazumdar	Indian National Congress
Katlicherra	None	Tajamul Ali Laskar	Independent
Algapur	None	Maulana Abdul Jalil Choudhury	Indian National Congress
Silchar	None	Jagadish Chandra Choudhury	Indian National Congress
Sonai	None	Nurul Haque Choudhury	Indian National Congress
Dholai	SC	Sisir Ranjan Das	Indian National Congress
Udharbond	None	Jagannath Singh	Indian National Congress
Lakhipur	None	Dinesh Prasad Goala	Independent
Barkhola	None	Altaf Hossain Mazumdar	Indian National Congress
Katigora	None	Nepal Chandra Das	Indian National Congress
Haflong	ST	G. C. Langthase	Independent
Bokajan	ST	Rajen Timung	Indian National Congress
Howraghat	ST	Dorsingh Terang	Indian National Congress
Diphu	ST	Kaizasong	Independent
Baithalangso	ST	Dhani Ram Rongpi	Indian National Congress
Mankachar	None	Zahirul Islam	Indian National Congress
Salmara South	None	Md. Bazlul Basit	Indian National Congress
Dhubri	None	Mohammad Umaruddin	Indian National Congress
Gauripur	None	Joynal Abedin	Indian National Congress
Golakganj	None	Kabir Chandra Roypradhani	Indian National Congress
Bilasipara West	None	Siraj Uddin	Indian National Congress
Bilasipara East	None	Rookmini Kanta Roye	Indian National Congress
Gossaigaon	None	Mithius Tudu	Indian National Congress
Kokrajhar West	ST	Ranendra Narayan Basumatary	Indian National Congress
Kokrajhar East	ST	Dambarudhar Brahma	Indian National Congress
Sidli	ST	Luis Islari	Indian National Congress
Dudhnai	ST	Jagat Patgiri	Indian National Congress
Goalpara East	None	Mohammad Ali	Independent
Goalpara West	None	Hassanuddin Ahmed	Indian National Congress
Jaleswar	None	Afzalur Rahman	Indian Congress
Sorbhog	None	Hemen Das	Communist Party of India
Bhabanipur	None	Mir Abdul Halim	Indian National Congress
Patacharkuchi	None	Rabi Ram Das	Indian National Congress
Barpeta	None	Ismail Hussain	Independent
Jania	None	Abdus Sobhan	Independent
Baghbar	None	Ibrahimali	Indian National Congress
Sarukhetri	None	Amir Hamcha Talukdar	Indian National Congress
Chenga	None	Danes Ali	Indian National Congress
Boko	SC	Upendra Das	Indian National Congress
Chaygaon	None	Harendra Nath Talukdar	Indian National Congress
Palasbari	None	Mohan Basumatari	Indian National Congress
Jalukbari	None	Shah Jalal Ali	Indian National Congress
Dispur	None	Tarini Mohan Barua	Indian National Congress
Gauhati East	None	Munin Sarmah	Indian National Congress
Gauhati West	None	Tareni	Indian National Congress
Hajo	None	Barkat Ullah	Indian National Congress
Kamalpur	None	Mathura Deka	Communist Party of India
Rangiya	None	Purna Boro	Communist Party of India
Tamulpur	None	Padam Bahadur Chouhan	Indian National Congress
Nalbari	None	Chandradhar Kalita	Independent
Barkhetry	None	Sheikh Chand Mahammad	Indian National Congress
Dharmapur	None	Bhumidhar Barman	Indian National Congress
Barama	ST	Alit Chandra Boro	Plain Tribals Council of Assam
Chapaguri	ST	Bimal Gayari	Plain Tribals Council of Assam
Panery	None	Mridula Saharia	Indian National Congress
Mangaldoi	SC	Kartik Sarkar	Indian National Congress
Dalgaon	None	Syeda Anwara Taimur	Indian National Congress
Udalguri	ST	Binoy Kumar Basumtary	Plain Tribals Council of Assam
Majbat	None	Silvius Condpan	Indian National Congress
Tezpur	None	Nabin Chandra Kath Hazarika	Indian National Congress
Rangapara	None	Golok Rajbanshi	Indian National Congress
Jagiroad	SC	Prasad Chandra Dalai	Indian National Congress
Marigaon	None	Md. Hussain	Independent
Raha	SC	Lakhi Prasad Hazarika	Indian National Congress
Dhing	None	Abu Nasar Ohid	Indian National Congress
Batadroba	None	Kiran Borah	Indian National Congress
Rupohihat	None	Mohammad Idris	Indian National Congress
Nowgong	None	Mukut Sharma	Indian National Congress
Barhampur	None	Ramesh Phukan	Indian National Congress
Samaguri	None	Nurul Hussain	Indian Congress
Kaliabor	None	Baloram Nag	Indian National Congress
Jamunamukh	None	Md. Farman Ali	Indian National Congress
Hojai	None	Sadhan Ranjan Sarkar	Indian National Congress
Lumding	None	Debesh Chakraborty	Indian National Congress
Bokakhat	None	Dharmeshwar Hazarika	Indian National Congress
Sarupathar	None	Abdul Matlib	Indian National Congress
Golaghat	None	Nagen Neog	Indian National Congress
Khumtai	None	Jiba Kanta Gogoi	Indian National Congress
Dergaon	SC	Hem Prakash Narayan	Indian National Congress
Jorhat	None	Dinanath Rajkhowa	Indian National Congress
Titabar	None	Joy Chandra Bora	Indian National Congress
Mariani	None	Siba Bura Gohain	Indian National Congress
Teok	None	Tilok Gogoi	Indian National Congress
Amguri	None	Kirti Dutta	Indian National Congress
Nazira	None	Hiteswar Saikia	Indian National Congress
Mahmara	None	Narad Kamar	Indian National Congress
Sonari	None	Satya Tati	Indian National Congress
Thowra	None	Tankeswar Dehingia	Indian National Congress
Sibsagar	None	Devanand Konwar	Indian National Congress
Bihpuria	None	Borgoram Deori	Indian National Congress
Naoboicha	None	Afazuddin Ahmed	Indian National Congress
Lakhimpur	None	Lekhan Lahan	Indian National Congress
Dhakuakhana	ST	Ragunath Pamegam	Indian National Congress
Dhemaji	ST	Durgeswar Patir	Indian National Congress
Jonai	ST	Puspadhar Pegu	Indian National Congress
Moran	None	Joy Chandra Nagbonshi	Indian National Congress
Dibrugarh	None	Keshab Chandra Gogoi	Indian National Congress
Lahowal	None	Dipok Moormoo	Indian National Congress
Chabua	None	Upen Sanaton	Indian National Congress
Tinsukia	None	Rajendra Nath Phukan	Indian National Congress
Digboi	None	Rameswar Dhanowar	Indian National Congress
Margherita	None	Kul Bahadur Chetri	Indian National Congress
Doom Dooma	None	Dileswar Tanti	Indian National Congress
Sadiya	None	Lambheswar Sonowal	Indian National Congress

== See also ==
- List of constituencies of the Assam Legislative Assembly
- 1983 elections in India
