= Jagdish Chandra Choudhury =

Indian politician

Member of the Assam Legislative Assembly
- In office 1983–1988
- Preceded by: Nurul Huda
- Succeeded by: Karnendu Bhattacharjee
- Constituency: Silchar

Personal details
- Party: Indian National Congress

Jagdish Chandra Choudhury is an Indian politician from Assam. He was elected to the Assam Legislative Assembly from Silchar constituency in the 1983 Assam Legislative Assembly election as a member of the Indian National Congress.
