= Ranjeet Kumar Dass =

Indian politician

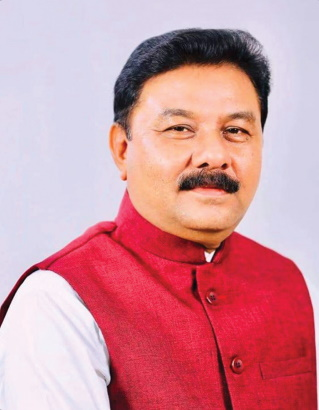
- Official portrait

Speaker of the Assam Legislative Assembly
- Incumbent
- Assumed office 21 May 2026
- Deputy: Habbey Teron
- Chief Minister: Himanta Biswa Sarma
- Preceded by: Biswajit Daimary
- In office 2 June 2016 – 25 December 2016
- Deputy: Dilip Kumar Paul
- Preceded by: Pranab Kumar Gogoi
- Succeeded by: Hitendra Nath Goswami

Cabinet Minister, Assam
- In office 10 May 2021 – 11 May 2026
- Chief Minister: Himanta Biswa Sarma
- Departments: Panchayat and Rural Development; Food, Public Distribution and Consumer Affairs (2021–24); Public Health Engineering (2021–22); General Administration, Tourism (2022–present)
- Preceded by: Naba Kumar Doley (P&RD); Phani Bhusan Choudhury (FCS&CA); Rihon Daimary (PHE); Himanta Biswa Sarma (GAD)

President, Assam Pradesh Bharatiya Janata Party
- In office 25 December 2016 – 26 June 2021
- Preceded by: Sarbananda Sonowal
- Succeeded by: Bhabesh Kalita

Member, Assam Legislative Assembly
- Incumbent
- Assumed office 4 May 2026
- Preceded by: Constituency created
- Constituency: Bhowanipur–Sorbhog
- In office 2 May 2021 – 4 May 2026
- Preceded by: Pabindra Deka
- Succeeded by: Constituency abolished
- Constituency: Patacharkuchi
- In office 13 May 2011 – 2 May 2021
- Preceded by: Uddabh Barman
- Succeeded by: Manoranjan Talukdar
- Constituency: Sorbhog

Personal details
- Born: 1 December 1965 (age 60) Barpeta, Assam, India
- Party: Bharatiya Janata Party (1992-present)
- Spouse: Anju Rani Baishya
- Children: 3 (one son and two daughters)
- Parent(s): Arabinda Das (father); Hira Das (mother)
- Education: Gauhati University (M.Sc. (Botany))
- Occupation: Politician
- Profession: Journalist
- Website: www.assamassembly.gov.in/speaker-assam-2016.html

Ranjeet Kumar Dass (born 1 December 1965) is an Indian politician and journalist from Assam. He is currently serving as the Speaker of Assam Legislative Assembly. He was the Minister of Panchayat and Rural Development, Food and Civil Supplies, and Consumer Affairs, Government of Assam in the first Himanta Biswa Sarma ministry since 2021. He is a member of the Assam Legislative Assembly from the Bharatiya Janata Party representing Bhowanipur–Sorbhog since 2026 and Patacharkuchi from 2021 to 2026 and Sorbhog from 2011 to 2021. He was elected as Speaker of the Assam Legislative Assembly from 2016 to 2017. He became a member of the BJP in 1992. From 2011 to 2016, he was the deputy leader of the BJP in the Assam Legislative Assembly. He served as the BJP Assam state unit president from 2016 to 2021.
