= Moinbari Satra =

Moinbari Satra is one of the major Sankardeva's religious establishment at Moinbari in border area Barpeta, Goalpara and Bongaigaon Districts in Assam and previously it was border of Ahom and Koch Kingdom. It was founded by Narayan Das Thakur Ata and it is a center of art, culture, literature, and classical studies of minority Muslim dominated Moinbari area.

== Establishment & History ==
Narayan Das Thakur Ata was one of the renowned disciples of Srimanta Sankardeva around last decade of 16th century. It was damaged by Burmese soldiers in 1824-26 due to the war among Ahom and Burmese. According to Rajnikanta Bordoloi's Manomoti, Moinbai was the last base camp of Burmese soldiers and they fought Hadiracki war from Moinbari village. After the Burmese defeat with British, The Satra was re constructed by the locals. There was a big earthquake in last decade of 19th century, and the Satra was partially re-damaged but local Muslim people helped to repair the Satra once again.

== Satra Relocated ==
Moinbari is a riverine village, hence the soil erosion became a big thread to the Satra and finally, on 5 October 2005 it was fully captured by the Brahmaputra. Barpeta DC and the Satra managing committee shifted and relocated the Satra at Chantabari near Sorbhog.
