= 2019 Indian general election in Assam =

Indian lower house election in Assam

- 11, 18, 23, April 2019

14 seats
- Turnout: 81.60% (▲1.48%)
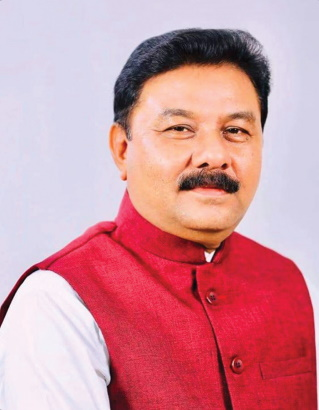

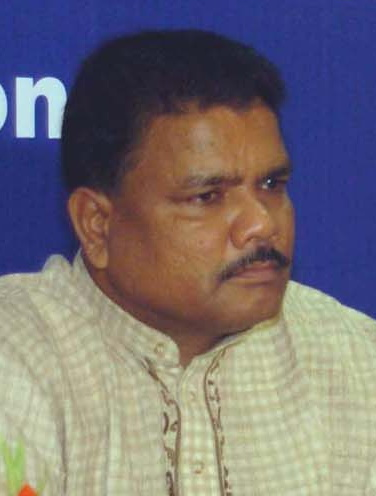

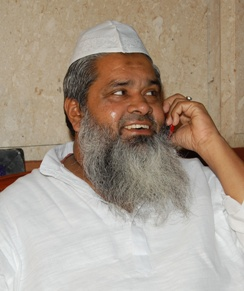
	First party	Second party	Third party
Leader	Ranjeet Kumar Dass	Ripun Bora	Badruddin Ajmal
Party	BJP	INC	AIUDF
Alliance	NDA	UPA	-
Leader since	2016	2016	2005
Leader's seat	Did not contest	Assam (Rajya Sabha)	Dhubri
Last election	7 seats	3 seats	3 seats
Seats won	9	3	1
Seat change	▲2	Steady	▼2
Popular vote	64,17,519	63,08,928	13,88,534
Percentage	36.05%	35.44%	7.80%
Swing	▼0.45%	▲5.84%	▼7%
Prime Minister before election
Narendra Modi
BJP
Prime Minister after election
Narendra Modi
BJP

The 2019 Indian general election held in India between April and May 2019 to constitute the 17th Lok Sabha. The elections could be held at an earlier date if the Council of Ministers recommends dissolution of the 16th Lok Sabha to the President of India. However, the government has publicly announced that the elections will be held according to schedule.

== Election schedule ==
Poll event	Phase		
Poll event	I	II	III
Notification date	18 March	19 March	28 March
Last date for filing nomination	25 March	26 March	4 April
Scrutiny of nomination	26 March	27 March	5 April
Last Date for withdrawal of nomination	28 March	29 March	8 April
Date of poll	11 April	18 April	23 April
Date of counting of votes/Result	23 May 2019		
No. of constituencies	5	5	4

== Parties and alliances ==
=== National Democratic Alliance ===
Party	Flag	Symbol	Leader	Seats contested
Bharatiya Janata Party			Sarbananda Sonowal	10
Asom Gana Parishad			Prafulla Kumar Mahanta	3
Bodoland People's Front			Hagrama Mohilary	1

=== United Progressive Alliance ===
Party	Flag	Symbol	Leader	Seats contested
Indian National Congress			Tarun Gogoi	14

=== Others ===
Party	Flag	Symbol	Leader	Seats contested
All India United Democratic Front			Badruddin Ajmal	3

== Candidates ==
Constituency		NDA		UPA		AIUDF	
#	Name	Party	Candidate	Party	Candidate	Party	Candidate
1	Karimganj	BJP	Kripanath Mallah	INC	Swarup Das	AIUDF	Radheshyam Biswas
2	Silchar	BJP	Rajdeep Roy	INC	Sushmita Dev		
3	Autonomous District	BJP	Horen Sing Bey	INC	Biren Sing Engti		
4	Dhubri	AGP	Zabed Islam	INC	Abu Taher Ali Bepari	AIUDF	Badruddin Ajmal
5	Kokrajhar	BPF	Pramila Rani Brahma	INC	Sabda Ram Rabha		
6	Barpeta	AGP	Kumar Deepak Das	INC	Abdul Khaleque	AIUDF	Haji Rafiqul Islam
7	Gauhati	BJP	Queen Oja	INC	Bobbeeta Sharma		
8	Mangaldoi	BJP	Dilip Saikia	INC	Bhubaneswar Kalita		
9	Tezpur	BJP	Pallab Lochan Das	INC	M. G. V. K Bhanu		
10	Nowgong	BJP	Rupak Sarmah	INC	Pradyut Bordoloi		
11	Kaliabor	AGP	Mani Madhav Mahanta	INC	Gaurav Gogoi		
12	Jorhat	BJP	Topon Kumar Gogoi	INC	Sushanta Borgohain		
13	Dibrugarh	BJP	Rameswar Teli	INC	Paban Singh Ghatowar		
14	Lakhimpur	BJP	Pradan Baruah	INC	Anil Borgohain		

== Opinion polls ==
Date published	Polling agency				Lead
Date published	Polling agency	NDA	UPA	AIUDF	Lead
Jan 2019	C Voter	6	7	1	1

Date published	Polling agency				Others	Lead
Date published	Polling agency	NDA	UPA	AIUDF	Others	Lead
Jan 2019	C Voter	44.3%	44.6%	2.5%	8.6%	0.3%

== Party-wise results ==
=== Results by Party/Alliance ===
Alliance/ Party		Popular vote			Seats		
Alliance/ Party		Votes	%	±pp	Contested	Won	+/−
NDA	BJP	64,84,596	36.05	▼0.46	10	9	▲2
NDA	AGP	14,80,697	8.23	▼6.60	3	0	Steady
NDA	BOPF	4,46,774	2.48	▲0.29	1	0	Steady
NDA	Total	84,12,067	46.76	Steady	13	9	▲2
UPA	INC	63,73,659	35.44	▲5.83	14	3	Steady
AIUDF		14,02,088	7.80	▼7.03	3	1	▼2
Others		7,51,184	4.18	Steady	68	0	Steady
IND		8,68,715	4.83	▼0.49	46	1	Steady
NOTA		1,78,353	0.99	Steady			
Total		1,79,86,066	100%	-	144	14	-

=== Seat share ===
1. NDA (64.0%)
2. UPA (22.0%)
3. AIUDF (7.00%)
4. IND (7.00%)

=== Vote share ===
1. NDA (46.8%)
2. UPA (35.4%)
3. AIUDF (7.80%)
4. AITC (0.41%)
5. CPM (0.23%)
6. CPI (0.17%)
7. Others (9.19%)

== Constituenties wise result ==
#	Constituency	Turnout	Candidate	Party	Votes	Runner-up	Party	Votes	Margin
1	Karimganj	79.18 ▲	Kripanath Mallah	Bharatiya Janata Party	4,73,046	Radheshyam Biswas	All India United Democratic Front	4,34,357	38,389
2	Silchar	79.51 ▲	Rajdeep Roy	Bharatiya Janata Party	4,99,414	Sushmita Dev	Indian National Congress	4,17,818	81,596
3	Autonomous District	77.63 ▼	Horen Singh Bey	Bharatiya Janata Party	3,81,316	Biren Singh Engti	Indian National Congress	1,41,690	2,39,626
4	Dhubri	90.66 ▲	Badruddin Ajmal	All India United Democratic Front	7,18,764	Abu Taher Bepari	Indian National Congress	4,92,506	2,26,258
5	Kokrajhar	83.30 ▲	Naba Kumar Sarania	Independent politician	4,84,560	Pramila Rani Brahma	Bodoland People's Front	4,46,744	37,786
6	Barpeta	86.57 ▲	Abdul Khaleque	Indian National Congress	6,45,173	Kumar Deepak Das	Asom Gana Parishad	5,04,866	1,40,307
7	Gauhati	80.87 ▲	Queen Oja	Bharatiya Janata Party	10,08,936	Bobbeeta Sarma	Indian National Congress	6,63,330	3,45,606
8	Mangaldoi	83.68 ▲	Dilip Saikia	Bharatiya Janata Party	7,35,469	Bhubaneshwar Kalita	Indian National Congress	5,96,924	1,38,545
9	Tezpur	79.48 ▲	Pallab Lochan Das	Bharatiya Janata Party	6,84,166	M.G.V.K Bhanu	Indian National Congress	4,41,325	2,42,841
10	Nowgong	83.23 ▲	Pradyut Bordoloi	Indian National Congress	7,39,724	Rupak Sharma	Bharatiya Janata Party	7,22,972	16,752
11	Kaliabor	82.09 ▲	Gourav Gogoi	Indian National Congress	7,86,092	Moni Madhab Mahanta	Asom Gana Parishad	5,76,098	2,09,994
12	Jorhat	77.57 ▼	Topon Kumar Gogoi	Bharatiya Janata Party	5,43,288	Sushanta Borgohain	Indian National Congress	4,60,635	82,653
13	Dibrugarh	77.30 ▼	Rameswar Teli	Bharatiya Janata Party	6,59,583	Paban Singh Ghatowar	Indian National Congress	2,95,017	3,64,566
14	Lakhimpur	75.17 ▼	Pradan Baruah	Bharatiya Janata Party	7,76,406	Anil Borgohain	Indian National Congress	4,25,855	3,50,551

== Post-election Union Council of Ministers from Assam ==
#	Name	Constituency	Designation	Department	From	To	Party
1	Sarbananda Sonowal	Rajya Sabha (Assam)	Cabinet Minister	Minister of AYUSH; Minister of Ports, Shipping and Waterways	7 July 2021	9 June 2024	BJP
2	Rameswar Teli	Dibrugarh	MoS	Ministry of Petroleum and Natural Gas (from July 2021); Ministry of Labour and Employment (from July 2021); Ministry of Food Processing Industries (until July 2021)	31 May 2019	9 June 2024	BJP

== Assembly segments-wise lead of parties ==

Party	Assembly segments	Position in Assembly 2016 (as of 2021 election)
Bharatiya Janata Party	67	64
Asom Gana Parishad	11	9
Bodoland People's Front	4	4
Indian National Congress	26	25
All India United Democratic Front	12	16
Independents	6	8
Total	126	

== See also ==
- 2018 Assam Panchayat Election
- 2021 Assam Legislative Assembly election
