= 1957 Indian general election in Assam =

12 (of 494) seats in the Lok Sabha
- Registered: 44,95,359
- Turnout: 20,74,158 (46.14%) ▼1.82%
	First party	Second party
	INC	PSP
Party	INC	PSP
Seats won	9	2
Seat change	▼2	▲2
Popular vote	11,84,708	4,57,643
Percentage	51.68%	19.96%
Swing	▲5.94%	new party
- 1957 Indian general election
Prime Minister before election
Jawaharlal Nehru
INC
Prime Minister after election
Jawaharlal Nehru
INC

The 1957 Indian general election in Assam were held to elect the 12 members from 10 constituencies in the state. The result was a victory for Indian National Congress winning 9 out of the 12 seats. And 2 seats were won by the Praja Socialist Party. The remaining seat was won by an Independent politician.

== Voting and results ==
Party	Votes	%	+/–	Seats	+/–
Indian National Congress	1,184,708	51.68	▲5.94%	9	▼2
Praja Socialist Party	457,643	19.96		2	▲2
Communist Party of India	235,044	10.25		0	–
Independents	415,217	18.11	▲4.37%	1	▲1
Total	2,292,612	100.00	–	12	▲
Registered voters/turnout	2,074,158	–			

== List of Elected MPs ==
Constituency		NoS	Winner				Runner-up				Margin	
Constituency		NoS	Candidate	Party	Votes	%	Candidate	Party	Votes	%	Votes	%
1	Cachar	2	Dwarika Nath Tewari (SC)	INC	2,19,704	55.85	Dev Dhirendra Mohan	IND	1,73,675	44.15	N/A	
1	Cachar	2	Nibaran Chandra Laskar	INC	Returned Uncontested (Note: The reserved seat was won by election, and the unreserved seat was won unopposed)							
2	Autonomous Districts (ST)	1	Hoover Hynniewta	IND	58,428	49.86	G. Gilbert Swell	INC	40,580	34.63	17,848	15.23
3	Dhubri	1	Amjad Ali	PSP	1,01,303	57.98	Nazmul Haque	INC	73,410	42.02	27,893	15.97
4	Goalpara	2	Dharanidhar Basumauari (ST)	INC	1,83,774	26.40	Bishnu Prasad Rabha (ST) (Note: Runner up for reserved seat)	CPI	98,180	14.11	N/A	
4	Goalpara	2	Rani Manjula Debi	INC	1,83,974	26.43	Bhabananda Datta (Note: Runner up for unreserved seat)	CPI	1,03,151	14.82	N/A	
5	Gauhati	1	Hem Barua	PSP	1,43,497	59.76	Devendra Nath Sarma	INC	96,624	40.24	46,873	19.52
6	Darrang	1	Bijoy Chandra Bhagavati	INC	Returned Uncontested							
7	Nowgong	1	Liladhar Kataki	INC	1,19,002	61.74	Sukadev Goswami	IND	53,947	27.99	65,055	33.75
8	Jorhat	1	Mofida Ahmed	INC	80,028	45.36	Syed Abdul Malik	CPI	33,713	19.11	46,315	26.25
9	Sibsagar	1	Profulla Chandra Borua	INC	92,374	56.12	Kedarnath Goswami	IND	32,633	19.83	59,741	36.29
10	Dibrugarh	1	Jogendra Nath Hazarika	INC	95,238	69.32	Nibaron Chandra Bora	PSP	25,712	18.71	69,526	50.60

== See also ==
- Elections in Assam

== Bibliography ==
- Volume I, 1957 Indian general election, 2nd Lok Sabha
