= Beki River =

One of the right bank tributaries of the Brahmaputra River

Coordinates: 26°14′N 90°44′E

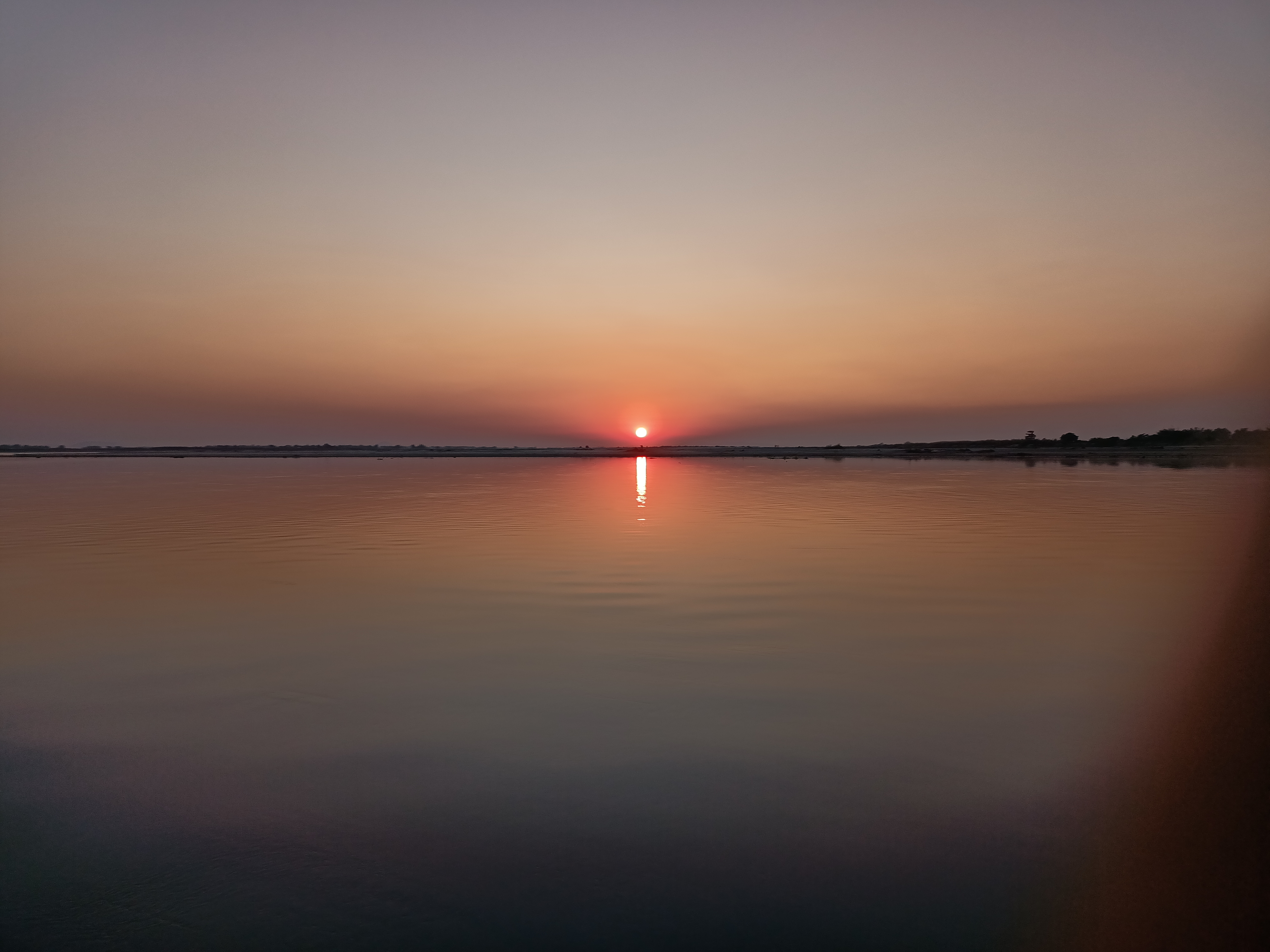
- Sunset at Beki River

Location
- Country: Bhutan

Beki River (also known as the Kurissu River in Bhutan, Assamese: বেকী নদী) is one of the right bank tributaries of the mighty Brahmaputra River, which flows down from the Bhutan region but a large portion flows in Indian state Assam. It touches flows from Bhutan touching Mathanguri, Naranguri, Khusrabari, Valaguri, Mainamata, Udalguri, Barpeta Road, Nichukha, Sorbhog, Kalgachia, Balaipathar, Kharballi, Bardanga, Kamarpara, Srirampur, Daoukmari, Jania, Chanpur, Rubi, Sawpur, Gobindapur, Moinbari and Balikuri. There are views of the river and its surroundings from the bridges situated on NH no- 31.

== Etymology ==
Beki is Boro origin. Bengkhi(Bodo: बेंखी) means feminine form of Bent.

== Origin ==
Beki River, also known as Kurissu River in Bhutan, lies between 26° 20' 00" N; 90° 56' 00" E which comes from Himalayan glacier. Bhutan has several major river systems flowing swiftly out of the Himalayas that are fed by glaciers in northern Bhutan. They flow south and join the Brahmaputra River basin in India. The Brahmaputra flows into Bangladesh and drains into the Bay of Bengal.

== Soil erosion ==
The soil erosion of Beki river has become a major problem of flowing two districts Barpeta and Baksa of Assam.
