= Misbahul Islam Laskar =

Indian politician

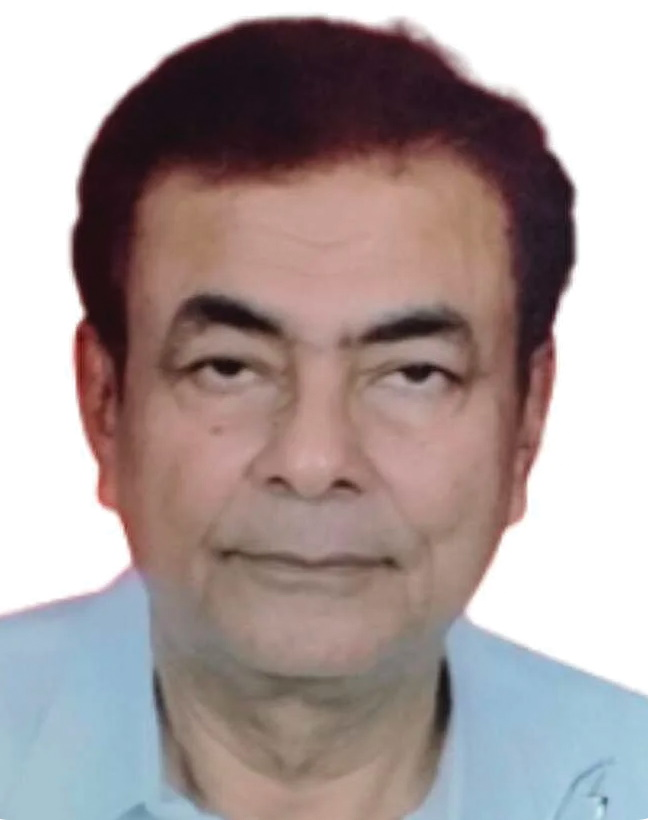
- Official portrait

Minister of State (Independent Charge), Government of Assam
- In office 7 June 2002 – 21 May 2006
- Chief Minister: Tarun Gogoi
- Portfolios: Tourism; Co-operation

Member, Assam Legislative Assembly
- Incumbent
- Assumed office 2 May 2021
- Preceded by: Kishor Nath
- Constituency: Barkhola
- In office 1996 – 11 May 2006
- Preceded by: Abdul Matin Mazumdar
- Succeeded by: Rumi Nath

Misbahul Islam Laskar is an Indian politician from Assam. He was elected to the Assam Legislative Assembly from Barkhola in the 2021 Assam Legislative Assembly election as a member of the Indian National Congress. He previously served as an MLA of the Assam Legislative Assembly from 1996 to 2006. He served as the Minister of Cooperation and Tourism from 2001 to 2006 in Tarun Gogoi's first cabinet. He also served as the chairman of Assam Minority Development Board.
