= Pranitha =

Pranitha or Pranita may refer to

- Pranitaa Pandit, Indian actress
- Pranitha Subhash, Indian actress
- Pranita Talukdar, Indian politician
- Pranitha Vardhineni, Indian archer
