= Pabindra Deka =

Indian politician

Pabindra Deka was an Asom Gana Parishad politician from Assam. He was elected to the Assam Legislative Assembly in the 2016 election from Patacharkuchi constituency. Just before the Assembly Election 2021, he joined Assam Jatiya Parishad and is contesting from Patacharkuchi Constituency against BJP state president Ranjeet Dass.
