= Silchar Lok Sabha constituency =

Lok Sabha constituency in Assam, India

Coordinates: 24.8°N 92.8°E

Silchar AS-8
- Lok Sabha constituency
- Interactive Map Outlining Silchar Lok Sabha constituency

Constituency details
- Country: India
- Region: Northeast India
- State: Assam
- Division: Barak Valley
- District: Cachar
- Assembly constituencies: 7
- Established: 1952
- Total electors: 1,060,175
- Reservation: SC

Member of Parliament
- 18th Lok Sabha
- Incumbent Parimal Suklabaidya
- Party: BJP
- Alliance: NDA
- Elected year: 2024
- Preceded by: Dr. Rajdeep Roy

Silchar Lok Sabha constituency is one of the 14 Lok Sabha constituencies in Assam state in north-eastern India. From 1951 to 1971, the area under it was referred as Cachar constituency. The constituency covers the entirety of Cachar district in the Barak Valley.

== Assembly segments ==
Silchar Lok Sabha constituency is composed of the following assembly segments:

=== Current assembly segments ===
No.	Name	District	Reserved for (SC/ST/None)	Member	Party	2024 Lead
114	Lakhipur	None	Cachar	Kaushik Rai	BJP	BJP
115	Udharbond	None	Cachar	Rajdeep Goala	BJP	BJP
116	Katigorah	None	Cachar	Kamalakhya Dey Purkayastha	BJP	BJP
117	Barkhola	None	Cachar	Kishor Nath	BJP	BJP
118	Silchar	None	Cachar	Rajdeep Roy	BJP	BJP
119	Sonai	None	Cachar	Aminul Haque Laskar	INC	INC
120	Dholai	SC	Cachar	Amiya Kanti Das	BJP	BJP

=== Previous assembly segments ===
Constituency number	Name	Reserved for (SC/ST/None)	District
9	Silchar	None	Cachar
10	Sonai	None	Cachar
11	Dholai	SC	Cachar
12	Udharbond	None	Cachar
13	Lakhipur	None	Cachar
14	Barkhola	None	Cachar
15	Katigorah	None	Cachar

== Members of Parliament ==
Year	Winner	Party
1952	Nibaran Chandra Laskar	Indian National Congress
1952	Suresh Chandra Deb	Indian National Congress
1957	Nibaran Chandra Laskar	Indian National Congress
1962	Jyotsna Chanda	Indian National Congress
1967	Jyotsna Chanda	Indian National Congress
1971	Jyotsna Chanda	Indian National Congress
1974	Nurul Huda	Communist Party of India (Marxist)
1977	Rashida Haque Choudhury	Indian National Congress
1980	Santosh Mohan Dev	Indian National Congress
1984	Santosh Mohan Dev	Indian National Congress
1989	Elections not held in Assam	
1991	Kabindra Purkayastha	Bharatiya Janata Party
1996	Santosh Mohan Dev	Indian National Congress
1998	Kabindra Purkayastha	Bharatiya Janata Party
1999	Santosh Mohan Dev	Indian National Congress
2004	Santosh Mohan Dev	Indian National Congress
2009	Kabindra Purkayastha	Bharatiya Janata Party
2014	Sushmita Dev	Indian National Congress
2019	Dr. Rajdeep Roy	Bharatiya Janata Party
2024	Parimal Suklabaidya	Bharatiya Janata Party

== Election results ==
=== General election 2024 ===
2024 Indian general election: Silchar
Party	Candidate	Votes	%	±%
BJP	Parimal Suklabaidya	652,405	59.88	▲7.29
INC	Suryakanta Sarkar	3,88,094	35.62	▼8.37
AITC	Radheshyam Biswas	20,493	1.88	▲1.51
NOTA	None of the Above	12,700	1.16	▲0.26
Majority		264,311	24.26	▲20.07
Turnout		1,090,948	79.37	
BJP hold		Swing		

=== Lok Sabha elections 2019 ===
2019 Indian general elections: Silchar
Party	Candidate	Votes	%	±%
BJP	Dr. Rajdeep Roy	499,414	52.59	+14.93
INC	Sushmita Dev	417,818	43.99	+1.92
NOTA	None of the Above	8,547	0.90	+0.36
AITC	Hitabrata Roy	3,514	0.37	
Majority		81,596	8.60	+4.19
Turnout		950,690	79.51	+4.06
BJP gain from INC		Swing	+6.50	

=== General elections 2014 ===
2014 Indian general elections: Silchar
Party	Candidate	Votes	%	±%
INC	Sushmita Dev	336,451	42.07	+13.42
BJP	Kabindra Purkayastha	3,01,210	37.66	+2.29
AIUDF	Kutub Ahmed Mazumder	85,530	10.69	−18.66
NOTA	None of the above	4,310	0.54	−−−
Majority		35,241	4.41	1.61
Turnout		8,00,058	75.46	
INC gain from BJP		Swing		

=== Lok Sabha elections 1971 ===
- Jyotsna Chanda (INC) : 100,798 votes
- A. F. Golam Osmani (IND) : 37,794

=== Lok Sabha elections 1952 ===
- Two candidates elected from this constituency, then called 'Cachar Lushal Hill'.
- Member One : Laskar, Nibaran Chandra (INC) : 192847 votes, defeated Ghose, Satyendra Kishore (KMPP) : 84160 votes
- Member Two : Deb, Suresh Chandra (INC) : 182,692 votes, defeated Patni, Nitai Chand (KMPP) : 71,704 votes

== See also ==
- 2019 Indian general election in Assam
- Cachar district
- List of constituencies of the Lok Sabha
