= Mehrab Ali Laskar =

Indian politician

Member of the Assam Legislative Assembly
- In office 1952–1957
- Preceded by: New constituency
- Succeeded by: Jyotsna Chanda
- Constituency: Silchar

Personal details
- Party: Indian National Congress

Mehrab Ali Laskar is an Indian politician who was a lawmaker in the state of Assam. He was elected to the Assam Legislative Assembly from Silchar constituency in the 1952 Assam Legislative Assembly election as an Independent candidate.
