= 1951–52 Indian general election in Assam =

- 27 March 1952

12 of the 489 seats in the Lok Sabha
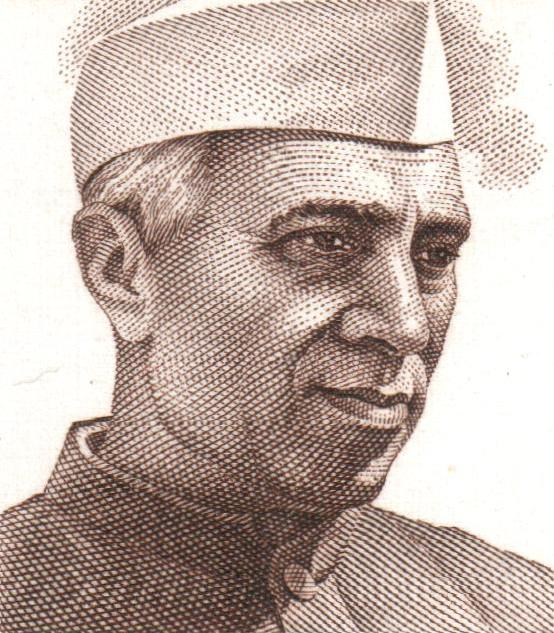

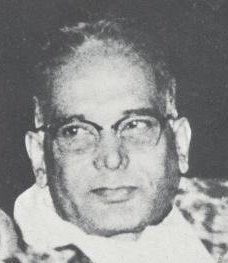
	First party	Second party
Leader	Jawaharlal Nehru	Jayaprakash Narayan
Party	INC	Socialist Party (India)
Seats won	11	1
Popular vote	1,210,707	506,943
Percentage	45.74%	19.15%

The 1951–52 Indian general election was the first democratic national election held in India after Independence, and the polls in Assam were held for 10 constituencies with 12 seats. The result was a victory for Indian National Congress winning 11 out of the 12 seats. Only one seat was won by the Socialist Party.

== Results ==
Party	Votes	%	Seats
Indian National Congress	1,210,707	45.74	11
Socialist Party	506,943	19.15	1
Kisan Mazdoor Praja Party	265,687	10.04	0
Tribal Sangha	116,629	4.41	0
Bharatiya Jana Sangh	96,303	3.64	0
All People's Party	36,851	1.39	0
Khasi-Jaintia Durbar	32,987	1.25	0
Hill People Party	17,350	0.66	0
Independents	363,670	13.74	0
Total	2,647,127	100.00	12
Source: ECI

=== By constituency ===
#	Constituency	Turnout	Winner	Party	Runner-up	Party
1	Cachar Lushal Hills	627,706	Laskar, Nibaran Chandra	INC	Ghose, Satyendra Kishore	KMPP
1	Cachar Lushal Hills	627,706	Deb, Suresh Chandra	INC	Patni, Nitai Chand	KMPP
2	Autonomous Districts	109,663	Bonily Khongmen	INC	Wilson Reade	KJD
3	Goalpara Garo Hills	704,435	Jonab Amjad Ali	SP	Rani Manjula Devi	IND
3	Goalpara Garo Hills	704,435	Sitanath Brahma Chowdhury	INC	Satish Chandra Basumatari	TS
4	Barpeta	176,868	Beliram Das	INC	Bipin Pal Das	SP
5	Gauhati	202,596	Rohini Kumar Chaudhury	INC	Lakshya Dhar Chaudhury	SP
6	Darrang	162,120	Kamakhya Prasad Tripathi	INC	H. C. Barua	SP
7	Nowgong	173,832	Barooah, Dev Kanta	INC	Goswami Lakshmi Prasad	SP
8	Golaghat Jorhat	172,180	Debeswar Sarma	INC	Bhabesh Chandra Barua	SP
9	Sibsagar North Lakhimpur	169,015	Buragohain, Surendranath	INC	Barbarua, Lalit	IND
10	Dibrugarh	148,712	Hazarika, Jogendra Nath	INC	Sonawal, Parasuram	SP

== Bibliography ==
- Volume I, 1951 Indian general election, 1st Lok Sabha
