= Rashida Haque Choudhury =

Indian politician

- রাশিদা হক চৌধুরী
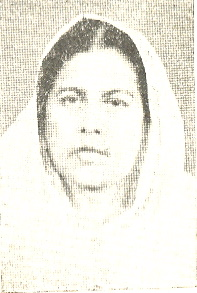

Minister of State of Social Welfare
- In office 1979–1980
- Prime Minister: Charan Singh

Member of the 6th Lok Sabha
- In office 1977–1979

Personal details
- Born: Rashida Haque Majumdar; 24 April 1926 Tezpur, British Raj
- Party: Indian National Congress
- Education: Lady Brabourne College (BA)

Rashida Haque Choudhury (Bengali: রাশিদা হক চৌধুরী, née Majumdar, born 24 April 1926, date of death unknown) was an Indian politician who was the Minister of State of Social Welfare in Charan Singh ministry from 1979 to 1980.

== Early life ==
Rashida Haque was born on 24 April 1926 in Tezpur, Assam. She belonged to a Bengali family of Muslim Majumdars from the village of Hatirhar in Cachar district. Her father, Alhaj Nasib Ali Majumdar, was a district magistrate. She was educated at a Mission school in Silchar and received her Bachelor of Arts degree from Lady Brabourne College, Kolkata.

== Career ==
Choudhury joined the Indian National Congress (INC) party in 1950. She contested the 1977 Indian general election as an INC candidate from Silchar. Choudhury obtained 1,38,638 votes and defeated Nurul Huda of the Communist Party of India (Marxist) by more than 28,000 votes. She served on the Committee of Social Work for Bangladesh Refugees. Later she joined the Indian National Congress (Urs), a breakaway faction of INC and was in 1979, made a Minister of State for Education, Social Welfare and Culture in the Charan Singh ministry.

Choudhury stood for election in 1980 from Silchar. This time, however, she received 46.98% of votes and finished second to INC(I)'s Santosh Mohan Dev (52% votes).

== Personal life ==
Rashida Haque married INC politician Moinul Hoque Choudhury on 28 December 1948, with whom she had one son and three daughters. She is deceased.
