= Swapan Kar =

Indian politician

MLA of Lumding Vidhan Sabha Constituency
- In office 2011–2016
- Preceded by: Sushil Dutta
- Succeeded by: Sibu Misra

Personal details
- Party: Indian National Congress

Swapan Kar is an Indian politician from the state of Assam. In 2011 he was elected as MLA of Lumding Vidhan Sabha Constituency in Assam Legislative Assembly.
