= 2014 Indian general election in Assam =

- 9 April

14 seats
- Turnout: 80.12%
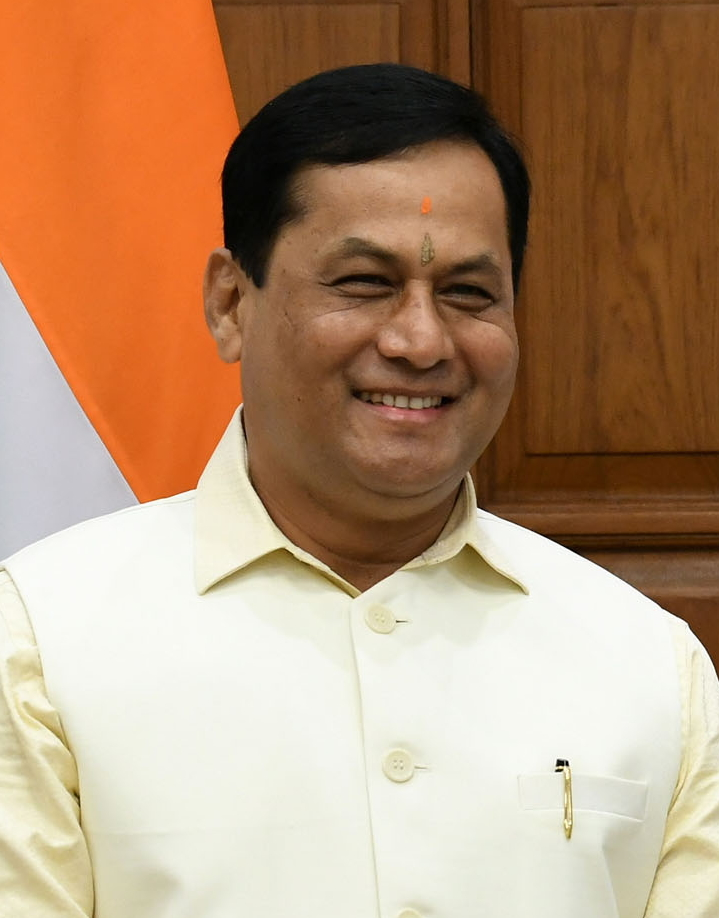

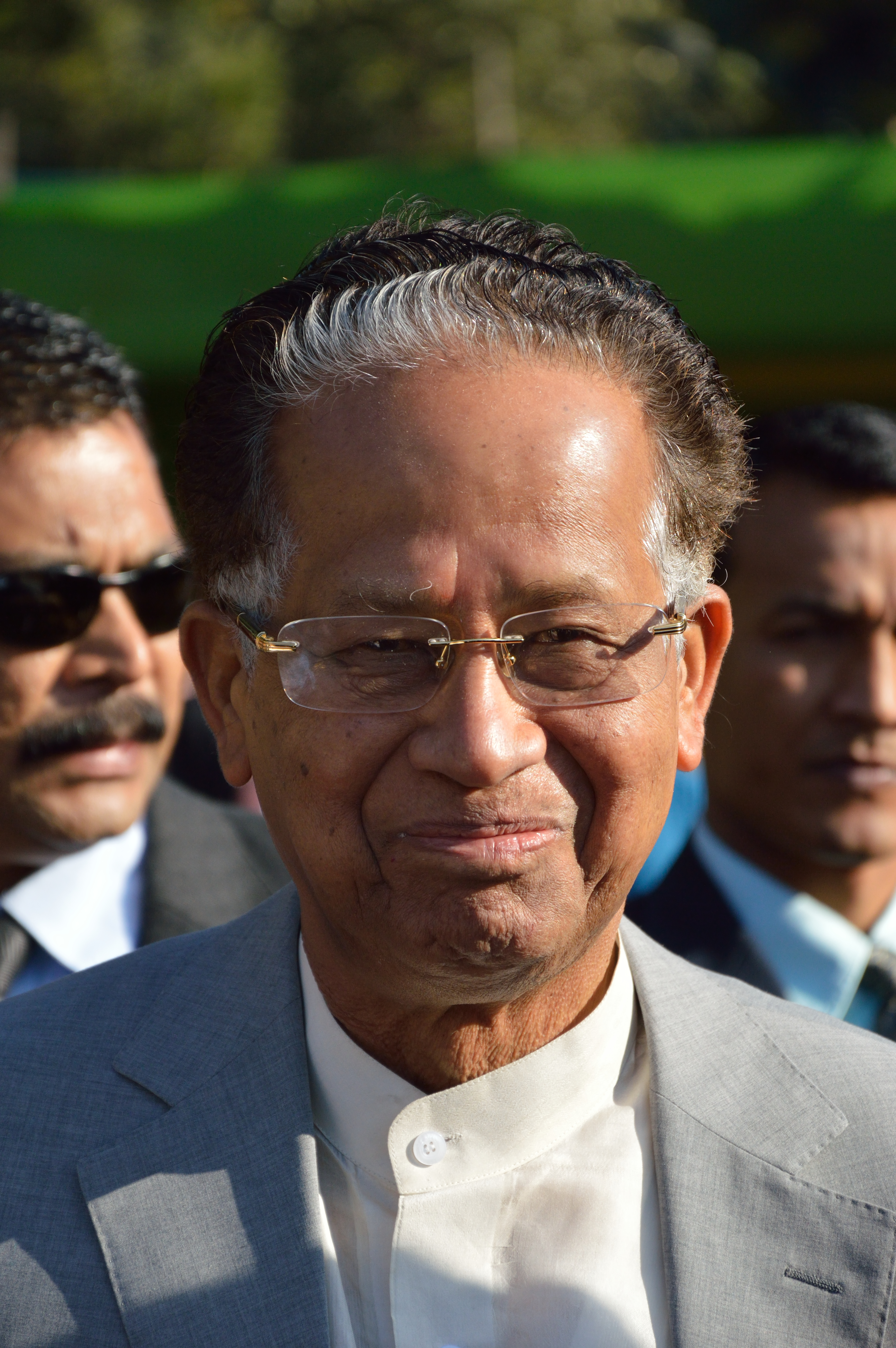

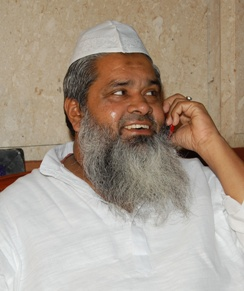
	First party	Second party	Third party
Leader	Sarbananda Sonowal	Tarun Gogoi	Badruddin Ajmal
Party	BJP	INC	AIUDF
Last election	5	7	1
Seats won	7	3	3
Seat change	▲2	▼4	▲2
Percentage	36.50%	29.60%	14.80%
Prime Minister before election
Manmohan Singh
INC
Prime Minister after election
Narendra Modi
BJP

The 2014 Indian general election polls in Assam for 14 Lok Sabha seats was held in three phases on 7, 12 and 24 April 2014. The total voter strength of Assam is 18,723,032.

The main political parties in Assam are Indian National Congress (INC), Bharatiya Janata Party (BJP), Asom Gana Parishad, All India United Democratic Front (AIUDF) and others.

Despite threats from insurgent militant groups in Northeast India, people turned out in large numbers for voting. Voters turnout in Assam was 80% which was one of highest in India.

== Election schedule ==
Constituency wise Election schedule are given below-

Polling Day	Phase	Date	Constituencies	Voting Percentage
1	1	7 April	Tezpur, Kaliabor, Jorhat, Dibrugarh, Lakhimpur	75
2	4	12 April	Karimganj, Silchar, Autonomous District	75
3	6	24 April	Dhubri, Kokrajhar, Barpeta, Gauhati, Mangaldoi, Nowgong,	70.6

== Parties and alliances ==
=== National Democratic Alliance ===
Party	Flag	Symbol	Leader	Seats contested
Bharatiya Janata Party			Sarbananda Sonowal	13
Independent			Naba Kumar Sarania	1

=== United Progressive Alliance ===
Party	Flag	Symbol	Leader	Seats contested
Indian National Congress			Tarun Gogoi	13
Bodoland People's Front			Hagrama Mohilary	1 + 1

=== Others ===
Party	Flag	Symbol	Leader	Seats contested
Asom Gana Parishad			Prafulla Kumar Mahanta	12
All India United Democratic Front			Badruddin Ajmal	10

== List of candidates ==
Constituency									
Constituency		NDA		UPA		AGP		AIUDF	
1	Karimganj	BJP	Krishna Das	INC	Lalit Mohan Suklabaidya	AGP	Rabindra Nath Choudhury	AIUDF	Radheshyam Biswas
2	Silchar	BJP	Kabindra Purkayastha	INC	Sushmita Dev	AGP	Bijoy Krishna Nath	AIUDF	Kutub Ah. Mazumder
3	Autonomous District	BJP	Joyram Engleng	INC	Biren Singh Engti				
4	Dhubri	BJP	Debomoy Sanyal	INC	Wazed Ali Choudhury	AGP	Anwar Hussain	AIUDF	Badruddin Ajmal
5	Kokrajhar	IND	Heera Saraniya	BPF	Chandan Brahma				
6	Barpeta	BJP	Chandra Mohan Patowary	INC	Ismail Hussain	AGP	Phani Bhusan Choudhury	AIUDF	Sirajuddin Ajmal
7	Gauhati	BJP	Bijoya Chakravarty	INC	Manash Borah	AGP	Birendra Prasad Baishya	AIUDF	Gopinath Das
8	Mangaldoi	BJP	Ramen Deka	INC	Kirip Chaliha	AGP	Madhab Rajbangshi	AIUDF	Paresh Baishya
8	Mangaldoi	BJP	Ramen Deka	BPF	Sahadev Das	AGP	Madhab Rajbangshi	AIUDF	Paresh Baishya
9	Tezpur	BJP	Ram Prasad Sharma	INC	Bhupen Kumar Borah	AGP	Joseph Toppo		
10	Nowgong	BJP	Rajen Gohain	INC	Jonjonali Baruah	AGP	Mridula Barkakoty	AIUDF	Aditya Langthasa
11	Kaliabor	BJP	Mrinal Saikia	INC	Gaurav Gogoi	AGP	Arun Kumar Sarma	AIUDF	Bijoy Kumar Tiru
12	Jorhat	BJP	Kamakhya Prasad Tasa	INC	Bijoy Krishna Handique	AGP	Prodip Hazarika	AIUDF	Nasir Ahmed
13	Dibrugarh	BJP	Rameswar Teli	INC	Paban Singh Ghatowar	AGP	Anup Phukan		
14	Lakhimpur	BJP	Sarbananda Sonowal	INC	Ranee Narah	AGP	Hari Prasad Dihingia	AIUDF	M. I. Haque Ch.

== Opinion poll ==
Conducted in Month(s)	Ref	Polling Organisation/Agency					
Conducted in Month(s)	Ref	Polling Organisation/Agency	INC	BJP	AGP	AUDF	BPF
Aug–Oct 2013		Times Now-India TV-CVoter	9	3	0	1	1
Jan–Feb 2014		Times Now-India TV-CVoter	7	5	0	1	1
March 2014		NDTV- Hansa Research	12	0	0	1	1

== Results ==
The results of the elections were declared on 16 May 2014. Voter Turnout was 80% despite threats from terrorist outfits

7	3	1	3
BJP	AIUDF	IND	INC

=== Results by Party/Alliance ===
Alliance/ Party		Popular vote			Seats		
Alliance/ Party		Votes	%	±pp	Contested	Won	+/−
NDA	BJP	55,07,152	36.51	▲20.30	13	7	▲3
NDA	IND	6,34,428	4.20	▲4.20	1	1	▲1
NDA	Total	61,41,580	40.71	Steady	14	8	Steady
UPA	INC	44,67,295	29.61	▼5.28	13	3	▼4
UPA	BOPF	3,30,106	2.19	▼3.22	1 + 1	0	▼1
UPA	Total	47,97,401	31.80	▼8.50	14 + 1	3	▼5
AIUDF		22,37,612	14.83	▼1.27	10	3	▲2
AGP		5,77,730	3.83	▼10.77	12	0	▼1
Others		3,82,031	2.53	Steady	54	0	Steady
IND		8,02,472	5.32	▼2.27	57	1	▲1
Total		1,50,85,883	100%	-	162	14	-

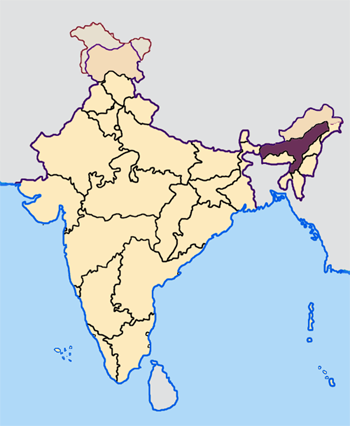

=== Results by constituency ===
Constituency		Winner				Runner Up				Margin	%
#	Name	Candidate	Party	Votes	%	Candidate	Party	Votes	%	Margin	%
1	Karimganj	Radheshyam Biswas	AIUDF	362,866	40.87	Lalit Mohan Suklabaidya	INC	226,562	25.52	136,304	15.35
2	Silchar	Sushmita Dev	INC	336,451	42.05	Kabindra Purkayastha	BJP	301,210	37.65	35,241	4.40
3	Autonomous District	Biren Sing Engti	INC	213,152	39.20	Joyram Engleng	BJP	189,057	34.77	24,095	4.43
4	Dhubri	Badruddin Ajmal	AIUDF	592,569	43.26	Wazed Ali Choudhury	INC	362,839	26.49	229,730	16.77
5	Kokrajhar	Heera Saraniya	IND	634,428	51.82	Urkhao Gwra Brahma	IND	278,649	22.76	355,779	29.06
6	Barpeta	Sirajuddin Ajmal	AIUDF	394,702	32.70	Chandra Mohan Patowary	BJP	352,361	29.19	42,341	3.51
7	Gauhati	Bijoya Chakravarty	BJP	764,985	50.59	Manash Borah	INC	449,201	29.70	315,784	20.89
8	Mangaldoi	Ramen Deka	BJP	486,357	39.43	Kirip Chaliha	INC	463,473	37.57	22,884	1.86
9	Tezpur	Ram Prasad Sharma	BJP	446,511	45.52	Bhupen Kumar Borah	INC	360,491	36.75	86,020	8.77
10	Nowgong	Rajen Gohain	BJP	494,146	40.16	Jonjonali Baruah	INC	350,587	28.49	143,559	11.67
11	Kaliabor	Gaurav Gogoi	INC	443,315	37.97	Mrinal Saikia	BJP	349,441	29.93	93,874	8.04
12	Jorhat	Kamakhya Prasad Tasa	BJP	456,420	48.99	Bijoy Krishna Handique	INC	354,000	38.00	102,420	10.99
13	Dibrugarh	Rameswar Teli	BJP	494,364	55.48	Paban Singh Ghatowar	INC	309,017	34.68	185,347	20.80
14	Lakhimpur	Sarbananda Sonowal	BJP	612,543	55.05	Ranee Narah	INC	320,405	28.80	292,138	26.25
