= Dilip Kumar Paul =

23rd Deputy Speaker of the Assam Legislative Assembly

Deputy Speaker of the Assam Legislative Assembly
- In office 3 June 2016 – 8 May 2018
- Preceded by: Bhimananda Tanti
- Succeeded by: Kripanath Mallah

Member of Assam Legislative Assembly
- In office 11 September 2014 – 2 May 2021
- Preceded by: Sushmita Dev
- Succeeded by: Dipayan Chakraborty
- Constituency: Silchar

Personal details
- Born: 19 March 1956 (age 70) Silchar, India
- Party: Independent
- Other political affiliations: Bharatiya Janata Party (until March 2021, December 2023-present)

Dilip Kumar Paul (born 19 March 1956 in Silchar, Assam) is an Indian politician and was the leader of the Bharatiya Janata Party who is elected to the assembly from the Silchar constituency twice, once in by-election against Indian National Congress leader Arun Mazumder and another against senior Congress leader Bhitika Dev, wife of former union minister Sontosh Mohan Dev. But he left BJP, in 2020-21, by carrying out some of the controversial issues within the party.
