= Mohitosh Purkayastha =

Indian politician

Member of the Assam Legislative Assembly
- In office 1972–1978
- Preceded by: Satindra Mohon Dev
- Succeeded by: Nurul Huda
- Constituency: Silchar

Personal details
- Party: Indian National Congress

Mohitosh Purkayastha is an Indian politician. He was elected to the Assam Legislative Assembly from Silchar constituency in the 1972 Assam Legislative Assembly election as a member of the Indian National Congress.
