= Rajdeep Roy =

Indian politician

Dr Rajdeep Roy

Member of Assam Legislative Assembly
- Incumbent
- Assumed office 4 May 2026
- Preceded by: Dipayan Chakraborty
- Constituency: Silchar

Member of Parliament, Lok Sabha
- In office 23 May 2019 – 3 June 2024
- Preceded by: Sushmita Dev
- Succeeded by: Parimal Suklabaidya
- Constituency: Silchar

Personal details
- Born: 7 September 1970 (age 55) Silchar, Assam, India
- Party: Bharatiya Janata Party
- Spouse: Doel Biswas

Dr Rajdeep Roy (born 7 September 1970) is an Indian politician. He was elected to the Lok Sabha, lower house of the Parliament of India, from Silchar, Assam in the 2019 Indian general election as a member of the Bharatiya Janata Party. (Note: M.B.B.S, M.S., M.Ch (Orthopaedics, UK). Educated at Gauhati University and Ninewells Medical School (UK))
