= Bhowanipur–Sorbhog Assembly constituency =

Assembly constituency of Assam

Bhowanipur–Sorbhog
- Constituency No. 21 for the Assam Legislative Assembly

Constituency details
- Country: India
- Region: Northeast India
- State: Assam
- Division: Lower Assam
- District: Bajali
- Lok Sabha constituency: Barpeta
- Established: 2023
- Reservation: None

Bhowanipur–Sorbhog Assembly constituency is one of the 126 assembly constituencies of the Assam Legislative Assembly in India. This constituency forms part of Barpeta Lok Sabha constituency. It was newly formed in 2023.

== Election Results ==
=== 2026 ===
2026 Assam Legislative Assembly election: Bhowanipur-Sorbhog
Party	Candidate	Votes	%	±%
BJP	Ranjeet Kumar Dass	113,069	58	
CPI(M)	Manoranjan Talukdar	73,917	37.91	
NOTA	NOTA	2,225	1.14	
Margin of victory		39,152	20.08	
Turnout		194,963		
Rejected ballots				
Registered electors				
BJP win (new seat)				
