= Lumding Assembly constituency =

Constituency of the Assam legislative assembly in India

Lumding
- Constituency No. 64 for the Assam Legislative Assembly
- 64-Lumding within Hojai district

Constituency details
- Country: India
- Region: Northeast India
- State: Assam
- Division: Central Assam
- District: Hojai
- Lok Sabha constituency: Kaziranga
- Established: 1957
- Total electors: 244,593 (2026)
- Reservation: None

Member of Legislative Assembly
- 16th Assam Legislative Assembly
- Incumbent Sibu Misra
- Party: BJP
- Alliance: NDA
- Elected year: 2026, 2021, 2016
- Preceded by: Swapan Kar (AIUDF)

Lumding Assembly constituency is one of the 126 state legislative assembly constituencies in Assam, India. It is one of the ten assembly segments that constitute the Kaziranga Lok Sabha constituency. Since 2016, it has been represented by Sibu Misra of the Bharatiya Janata Party.

Established in 1957, the constituency had its boundaries redrawn during the 2023 delimitation exercise. The reconstituted constituency now includes Lumding town, Lanka town and many other rural areas of the Hojai district.

Most successful political parties from Lumding Assembly constituency since 1957
1. INC (6 times) (40.0%)
2. BJP (5 times) (33.4%)
3. AIUDF (1 time) (6.66%)
4. AGP (1 time) (6.66%)
5. CPI(M) (1 time) (6.66%)
6. IND (1 time) (6.66%)

== Local self-governed segments ==
Lumding Assembly constituency is composed of the following local self-governed segments:

- Lumding Municipal Board
- Lanka Municipal Board
- Lumding Railway Colony Census Town
- Dhalpukhuri Development Block
- Lumding Development Block
- Udali Development Block

== Members of the Legislative Assembly ==
Following is the list of members representing Lumding Assembly constituency in Assam Legislature:

Election	Member	Political Party
2026	Sibu Misra	Bharatiya Janata Party
2021	Sibu Misra	Bharatiya Janata Party
2016	Sibu Misra	Bharatiya Janata Party
2011	Swapan Kar	All India United Democratic Front
2006	Sushil Dutta	Bharatiya Janata Party
2001	Sushil Dutta	Bharatiya Janata Party
1996	Hazi Abdur Rouf	Asom Gana Parishad
1991	Debesh Chakraborty	Indian National Congress
1985	Ardhendu Kumar Dey	Independent politician
1983	Debesh Chakraborty	Indian National Congress
1978	Biresh Misra	Communist Party of India (Marxist)
1972	Santi Ranjan Dasgupta	Indian National Congress
1967	Sadhan Ranjan Sarkar	Indian National Congress
1962	Santi Ranjan Dasgupta	Indian National Congress
1957	Ram Nath Sarma	Indian National Congress

== Election results ==
=== 2026 ===
2026 Assam Legislative Assembly election: Lumding
Party	Candidate	Votes	%	±%
BJP	Sibu Misra	115,330	52.86	▲1.82
INC	Swapan Kar	93,216	42.72	▼1.60
Independent	Jashada Dulal Rakshit	5,444	2.49	New entry
NOTA	None of the above	2,470	1.13	▲0.28
Margin of victory		22,114	10.13	▲3.41
Turnout		218,200	89.21	▲6.97
Registered electors		244,593		▲15.21
BJP hold		Swing	▲1.71	

=== 2021 ===
2021 Assam Legislative Assembly election : Lumding
Party	Candidate	Votes	%	±%
BJP	Sibu Misra	89,108	51.04	▲5.00
INC	Swapan Kar	77,377	44.32	▲17.70
AJP	Mausumi Sarma Bezbaruah	3,260	1.87	New entry
NOTA	None of the above	1,485	0.85	▲0.07
Margin of victory		11,731	6.72	−12.64
Turnout		174,590	82.24%	−3.73
Registered electors		212,304		
BJP hold		Swing	+5.00	

=== 2016 ===
2016 Assam Legislative Assembly election: Lumding
Party	Candidate	Votes	%	±%
BJP	Sibu Misra	72,072	46.04	+16.17
INC	Netra Ranjan Mahanta	41,672	26.62	−1.28
AIUDF	Swapan Kar	39,075	24.96	−6.37
NOTA	None of the above	1,232	0.78	N/A
Majority		30,400	19.42	+17.96
Turnout		1,56,524	85.90	+11.49
BJP gain from AIUDF		Swing	+11.27	

=== 2011 ===
2011 Assam Legislative Assembly election: Lumding
Party	Candidate	Votes	%	±%
AIUDF	Swapan Kar	39,443	31.33	+9.75
BJP	Sushil Dutta	38,612	29.87	−1.46
INC	Shefali Dey	35,124	27.90	+3.37
AGP	Idris Ali	5,207	4.14	−0.12
AITC	Uma Bhowmik	2,915	2.32	N/A
Independent	Tankeshwar Kakoti	2,049	1.63	N/A
Independent	Mukut Patar	1,477	1.17	N/A
Independent	Md. Azarul Haque	1,087	0.86	N/A
Independent	Ashim Mazumder	990	0.79	N/A
Majority		1,831	1.46	−5.16
Turnout		1,25,904	74.41	+1.07
AIUDF gain from BJP		Swing	+5.61	

=== 2006 ===
Assam Legislative Assembly election, 2006: Lumding
Party	Candidate	Votes	%	±%
BJP	Sushil Dutta	36,693	31.15	
INC	Maya Chakraborty	28,894	24.53	
AIUDF	Pritimohan Nath	25,420	21.58	
NCP	Swapan Kar	17,037	14.46	
AGP	Narayan Chandra Bhowmik	5,020	4.26	
Independent	Debasish Gupta	3,240	2.75	
AGP(P)	Montosh Paul	1,485	1.26	
Majority		7,799	6.62	
Turnout		1,17,789	73.34	
BJP hold		Swing		

== See also ==
- Silchar Assembly constituency
- Hailakandi Assembly constituency
- Hojai Assembly constituency
- Katigorah Assembly constituency
- Ram Krishna Nagar Assembly constituency
- Bijni Assembly constituency
- Patharkandi Assembly constituency
- Borkhola Assembly constituency
- Dholai Assembly constituency
