= Kanad Purkayastha =

Indian politician

Member of Parliament, Rajya Sabha
- Incumbent
- Assumed office 19 June 2025
- Preceded by: Mission Ranjan Das
- Constituency: Assam

Personal details
- Party: Bharatiya Janata Party
- Parent: Kabindra Purkayastha
- Occupation: Politician

Kanad Purkayastha is an Indian politician from Bharatiya Janata Party from the state of Assam. He is a member of the Rajya Sabha from a constituency in Assam.

He is the son of former Union Minister of State Kabindra Purkayastha.

== See also ==
- 2025 Rajya Sabha elections
- Bharatiya Janata Party – Assam
- Kabindra Purkayastha
