= Sibu Misra =

Indian politician

Member of Assam Legislative Assembly
- Incumbent
- Assumed office 2016
- Preceded by: Swapan Kar
- Constituency: Lumding

Personal details
- Born: 26 November 1969 (age 56) Lumding
- Party: Bharatiya Janata Party
- Spouse: Smt. Meera Misra
- Children: 2
- Profession: Politician

Sibu Misra is a Bharatiya Janata Party politician from Assam, India. He has been elected in Assam Legislative Assembly in 2016, 2021 and 2026 from Lumding Assembly constituency.

Sibu Misra is a social worker from Lumding constituency. He is an MLA from BJP.
