= Sorbhog Assembly constituency =

Constituency of the Assam legislative assembly in India

Coordinates: 26.49°N 90.89°E

Sorbhog
- Former constituency No. 40 for the Assam Legislative Assembly

Constituency details
- Country: India
- Region: Northeast India
- State: Assam
- District: Barpeta
- Lok Sabha constituency: Kokrajhar
- Established: 1951
- Abolished: 2023
- Reservation: SC

Sorbhog was one of the 126 assembly constituencies of Assam, a north east state of India. Sorbhog was also part of Kokrajhar Lok Sabha constituency. This constituency was abolished in 2023.

== Members of Legislative Assembly ==
- 1951: Akshoy Kumar Das, Indian National Congress
- 1957: Ghaneshyam Talukdar, Independent
- 1962: Akshoy Kumar Das, Indian National Congress
- 1967: Pranita Talukdar, Indian National Congress
- 1972: Pranita Talukdar, Indian National Congress
- 1978: Hemen Das, Communist Party of India (Marxist)
- 1983: Hemen Das, Communist Party of India (Marxist)
- 1985: Hemen Das, Communist Party of India (Marxist)
- 1991: Samsul Hoque, Indian National Congress
- 1996: Hemen Das, Communist Party of India (Marxist)
- 2001: Samsul Hoque, Independent
- 2006: Uddhab Barman, Communist Party of India (Marxist)
- 2011: Ranjit Kumar Das, Bharatiya Janata Party
- 2016: Ranjit Kumar Das, Bharatiya Janata Party
- 2021: Manoranjan Talukdar, Communist Party of India (Marxist)

== Election results ==
=== 2021 ===
2021 Assam Legislative Assembly election: Sorbhog
Party	Candidate	Votes	%	±%
CPI(M)	Manoranjan Talukdar	96,134	50.21	
BJP	Sankar Chandra Das	85872	44.85	

=== 2016 ===
2016 Assam Legislative Assembly election: Sorbhog
Party	Candidate	Votes	%	±%
BJP	Ranjit Kumar Das	56,454	33.33	+2.08
INC	Anurupa Hannan	36,928	21.80	+5.60
CPI(M)	Manoranjan Talukdar	29,082	17.17	+1.35
Independent	Pradip Deb Nath	19,387	11.44	N/A
AIUDF	Samsul Hoque	17,504	10.33	−6.20
Independent	Anilananda Pathak	3,755	2.21	N/A
Independent	Himangshu Bharali	1,181	0.69	N/A
Independent	Mohidul Islam	1,010	0.59	−0.48
Independent	Nirmal Kumar Agarwala	630	0.37	−0.06
TNRMPI	Ikbal Hussain	602	0.35	N/A
RPI(A)	Manju Shabnam	466	0.27	N/A
JCP	Mukhtar Hussain	435	0.25	N/A
BGP	Subal Ch. Das	414	0.24	N/A
Independent	Abdul Hakim Ahmed	370	0.21	N/A
NOTA	None of the above	1,129	0.66	N/A
Majority		19,526	11.53	−3.19
Turnout		1,69,347	86.69	+3.69
Registered electors		1,95,330		
BJP hold		Swing		

=== 2011 ===
2011 Assam Legislative Assembly election: Sorbhog
Party	Candidate	Votes	%	±%
BJP	Ranjit Kumar Das	40,716	31.25	+15.49
AIUDF	Abdul Salim	21,534	16.53	+6.18
INC	Abdus Samad Ahmed	21,099	16.20	−5.67
CPI(M)	Manoranjan Talukdar	20,609	15.82	−11.77
Independent	Iyad Ali	20,516	15.75	N/A
Independent	Mohidul Islam	1,392	1.07	N/A
AITC	Mrinal Kanti Sarkar	1,190	0.91	N/A
Independent	Khanindra Nath Sarkar	809	0.62	N/A
Independent	Faizan Nessa	807	0.62	N/A
Independent	Nirmal Agarwal	556	0.43	N/A
Independent	Moniram Patgiri	552	0.42	N/A
NCP	Khalilur Rahman	492	0.38	−0.28
Majority		19,182	14.72	+9.00
Turnout		1,30,272	83.00	+1.69
Registered electors		1,56,954		
BJP gain from CPI(M)		Swing	+1.69	

=== 2006 ===
Assam Legislative Assembly election, 2006: Sorbhog
Party	Candidate	Votes	%	±%
CPI(M)	Uddhab Barman	33,681	27.59	+1.94
INC	Samsul Hoque	27,600	21.87	+18.15
BJP	Sankar Chandra Das	19,238	15.76	−12.94
Independent	Feddus Ali	15,444	12.65	N/A
AIUDF	Anowar Hussain	12,641	10.35	N/A
Independent	Basanta Swargiary	4,670	3.82	N/A
Independent	Pranita Talukdar	3,408	2.79	N/A
Independent	Benu Saha	2,566	2.10	+1.90
AGP(P)	Abdul Hakim Mandal	1,180	0.97	N/A
HSP	Bhabendra Brahma	915	0.75	N/A
Independent	Lal Mahmud Ansari	850	0.70	N/A
NCP	Khalilur Rahman	805	0.66	N/A
Majority		6,081	5.72	+1.52
Turnout		1,22,098	81.31	+6.35
Registered electors		1,50,171		
CPI(M) gain from Independent		Swing		

=== 2001 ===
Assam Legislative Assembly election, 2001: Sorbhog
Party	Candidate	Votes	%	±%
Independent	Samsul Hoque	31,890	32.90	
BJP	Anilananda Pathak	27,819	28.70	
CPI(M)	Hemen Das	24,859	25.65	
Independent	Kuladhar Das	6,850	7.07	
INC	Samarendra Uzir	3,606	3.72	
AITC	Kulendra	816	0.84	
Independent	Haripada Mandal	532	0.55	
UBNLF	Rajib Basumatary	367	0.38	
Independent	Benu Saha	192	0.20	
Majority		4,071	4.20	
Turnout		96,931	74.96	
Registered electors		1,29,311		
Independent gain from CPI(M)		Swing		

== See also ==
- Sorbhog
- List of constituencies of Assam Legislative Assembly
