= Satindra Mohon Dev =

Indian politician

Member of the Assam Legislative Assembly
- In office 1967–1972
- Preceded by: Mohitosh Purkayastha
- Succeeded by: Nanda Kishor Sinha
- Constituency: Silchar

Personal details
- Party: Indian National Congress

Satindra Mohon Dev is an Indian politician from Assam. He was elected to the Assam Legislative Assembly from Silchar constituency in the 1967 Assam Legislative Assembly election as a member of the Indian National Congress.
