= Lumding =

Town in Assam, India

- Town in Assam
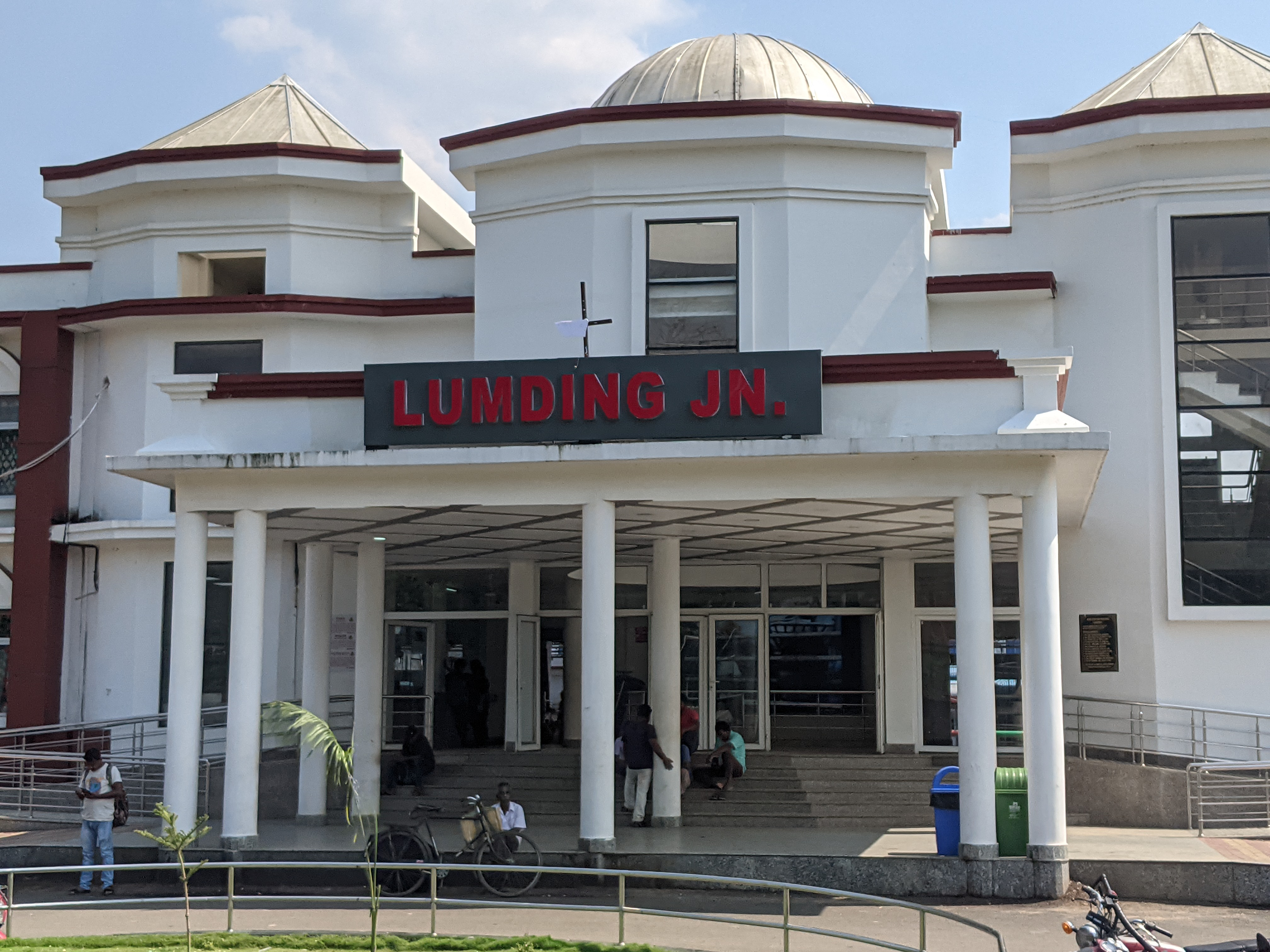
- Lumding Junction Railway Station

- Location in Assam, India Lumding (India)
- Coordinates: 25.75°N 93.17°E
- Country: India
- State: Assam
- District: Hojai

Government
  - Body: Lumding Municipality Board
  - MLA: Sibu Misra (BJP)
  - Chairman: Swastika Routh Majumder (BJP)
  - Vice Chairman: Janardhan Paul (BJP)
- Elevation: 125 m (410 ft)

Population (2011)
  - Total: 31,347
- Time zone: UTC+5:30 (IST)
- PIN: 782447
- Telephone code: +91-3674
- ISO 3166 code: IN-AS
- Vehicle registration: AS
- Official languages: Assamese, Meitei (Manipuri)
- Most spoken: Bengali

Lumding is a town with a municipal board in the Hojai District of the Indian state of Assam. It is the location of Lumding Junction railway station, a hub for India's Northeast Frontier Railway network.

Assamese and Meitei (Manipuri) are the official languages of this place.

== Geography ==
=== Climate ===
Hills of Lumding put the town a notable altitude above the sea level, but summer temperatures can reach up to 40 °C and the winters can be as chilling as 4-5 °C with fog and mist intervening in the early hours of the day. Monsoon is a notable season here, with rainfall around 60–125mm at an average. But its hills and altitude prevents any flooding in the region during heavy monsoon.

Climate here is favourable for vegetation and agriculture of tropical fruits and vegetables. Fruits like coconuts, pineapple, jack-fruit, papaya, banana are grown here. Cucumber, potatoes, cabbages and other green vegetables are common agricultural vegetables here.

Climate data for Lumding (1971–2000, extremes 1948–present)
Month	Jan	Feb	Mar	Apr	May	Jun	Jul	Aug	Sep	Oct	Nov	Dec	Year
Record high °C (°F)	33.3 (91.9)	33.9 (93.0)	38.5 (101.3)	41.9 (107.4)	41.9 (107.4)	42.0 (107.6)	38.5 (101.3)	39.0 (102.2)	40.2 (104.4)	36.2 (97.2)	33.0 (91.4)	31.0 (87.8)	42.0 (107.6)
Mean daily maximum °C (°F)	23.9 (75.0)	27.5 (81.5)	30.9 (87.6)	32.3 (90.1)	32.6 (90.7)	33.3 (91.9)	33.4 (92.1)	33.5 (92.3)	32.7 (90.9)	31.8 (89.2)	28.2 (82.8)	25.9 (78.6)	30.6 (87.1)
Mean daily minimum °C (°F)	8.1 (46.6)	10.4 (50.7)	14.4 (57.9)	18.7 (65.7)	21.0 (69.8)	23.7 (74.7)	24.2 (75.6)	24.2 (75.6)	23.3 (73.9)	20.9 (69.6)	15.3 (59.5)	9.9 (49.8)	17.9 (64.2)
Record low °C (°F)	2.1 (35.8)	2.8 (37.0)	7.2 (45.0)	5.0 (41.0)	10.0 (50.0)	16.5 (61.7)	16.1 (61.0)	15.0 (59.0)	20.0 (68.0)	13.0 (55.4)	8.3 (46.9)	4.4 (39.9)	2.1 (35.8)
Average rainfall mm (inches)	10.0 (0.39)	23.3 (0.92)	52.8 (2.08)	85.9 (3.38)	120.1 (4.73)	227.8 (8.97)	205.8 (8.10)	203.3 (8.00)	174.3 (6.86)	99.4 (3.91)	30.3 (1.19)	6.2 (0.24)	1,239.2 (48.79)
Average rainy days	0.8	2.1	4.1	7.4	8.9	11.5	11.2	11.1	8.9	5.4	2.0	0.7	74.0
Average relative humidity (%) (at 17:30 IST)	84	79	77	83	85	86	86	87	87	89	89	88	85
Source: India Meteorological Department

== Demographics ==
=== Languages ===
Languages spoken in Lumding town (2011)
1. Bengali (87.2%)
2. Hindi (6.58%)
3. Nepali (2.63%)
4. Assamese (3.57%)

The overwhelming majority of the population speaks Bengali, followed by significant number of Hindi, Nepali and Assamese speakers.

=== Religion ===
Religion in Lumding (2011)
1. Hinduism (97.2%)
2. Islam (1.45%)
3. Christianity (0.41%)
4. Buddhism (0.39%)
5. Sikhism (0.26%)
6. Jainism (0.20%)

According to the official census of 2011, Lumding has a population of 31,347 in which Hinduism is the majority religion in Lumding followed by around 30,479 peoples. Islam, Christianity, Buddhism, Sikhism and Jainism have a very small population in Lumding.

== Government and politics ==
Lumding is part of Nowgong (Lok Sabha constituency).

== Education ==
- Lumding College, established in 1959, is affiliated to the Gauhati University.

== See also ==
- Lumding Vidhan Sabha
