= Manoranjan Talukdar =

Indian politician

Member of the Assam Legislative Assembly
- Incumbent
- Assumed office 21 May 2021
- Preceded by: Ranjeet Kumar Dass
- Constituency: Sorbhog (Vidhan Sabha constituency)

Personal details
- Born: 21 February 1954 (age 72) Sorbhog, Assam, India
- Party: Communist Party of India (Marxist)
- Profession: Politician

Manoranjan Talukdar (born 21 February 1954) is an Indian politician from Assam. Since 2021, he is the member of the Assam Legislative Assembly representing Sorbhog constituency as a member of the Communist Party of India (Marxist).

He is also a member of the state secretariat of Assam state unit of CPIM.
