= Dipayan Chakraborty =

Indian politician

Member of Assam Legislative Assembly
- Incumbent
- Assumed office 21 May 2021
- Preceded by: Dilip Kumar Paul
- Constituency: Silchar

Personal details
- Party: Bharatiya Janata Party

Dipayan Chakraborty is an Indian politician from Assam and a member of Bharatiya Janata Party. He was elected to the Assam Legislative Assembly from Silchar constituency in the 2021 Assam Legislative Assembly election.
