= Sushil Dutta =

Indian politician

Sushil Dutta is a Bharatiya Janata Party politician from Assam. He has been elected to the Assam Legislative Assembly in the 2006 and 2011 elections from Lumding constituency.
