= Suresh Chandra Deb =

Indian politician

Member of Parliament, Lok Sabha
- In office 1952–1957
- Constituency: Cachar-Lushai Hills, Assam

Personal details
- Born: May 1894
- Died: Unknown
- Party: Indian National Congress

Suresh Chandra Deb (born May 1894, date of death unknown) was an Indian politician belonging to the Indian National Congress. He was elected to the Lok Sabha, lower house of the Parliament of India from the Cachar-Lushai Hills constituency Assam in 1952.
