= Pranita Talukdar =

Indian politician (1935–2019)

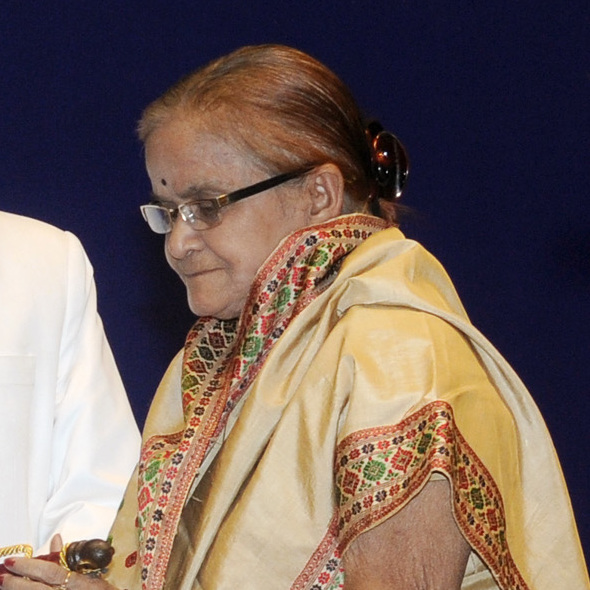

Assam Legislative Assembly
- In office 1967–1978
- Preceded by: Akshoy Kumar Das
- Succeeded by: Hemen Das
- Constituency: Sorbhog

Personal details
- Born: 1935
- Died: 20 April 2019 (aged 83-84)
- Party: Indian National Congress

Pranita Talukdar was an Indian teacher, social worker and politician belonging to Indian National Congress. She was twice elected as a member of Assam Legislative Assembly as an Indian National Congress candidate from Sorbhog.

== Biography ==
Talukdar was born in 1935. Her husband Ghanashyam Talukdar was a member of Assam Legislative Assembly who established Barnagar College.

Talukdar was the headmistress of Girls' Higher Secondary School, a lecturer at Barnagar College and principal at Barpeta Girls' College.

Talukdar was elected as a member of the Assam Legislative Assembly from Sorbhog in 1967. She was elected again from Sorbhog in 1972.

Talukdar also worked for women. She was the president of the Central Women and Children Welfare Association. She received Stree Shakti Puraskar in 2013 for her contribution to women's empowerment.

Talukdar died on 20 April 2019.
