= Rumi Nath =

Indian politician

Rumi Nath is an Indian politician and a former member of Assam Legislative Assembly. In 2006, she contested and won election from Borkhola constituency to the Assembly as a BJP candidate. She later defected from BJP and joined Indian National Congress. She won the election again in 2011 as a Congress candidate. She is a doctor by profession. She was arrested in April 2015 by Guwahati police for her alleged connection to pan-India auto theft racket. In October 2020, she was expelled from the Indian National Congress for anti-party activities.

== Personal life ==
In May 2012, she allegedly converted to Islam, changed her name to Rabeya Sultana and married her long-time friend. She has a daughter from the marriage.
