= Bithika Dev =

Indian politician

Member of the Assam Legislative Assembly
- In office 11 May 2006 – 13 May 2011
- Preceded by: Bimalangshu Roy
- Succeeded by: Sushmita Dev
- Constituency: Silchar

Personal details
- Party: Indian National Congress
- Spouse: Santosh Mohan Dev
- Children: 4 daughters including Sushmita Dev

Bithika Dev is an Indian politician. She was elected to the Assam Legislative Assembly from Silchar in the 2006 elections as a member of the Indian National Congress. Her husband Santosh Mohan Dev was a Cabinet Minister of India.
