= Nurul Huda (CPI(M) politician) =

Indian politician

Nurul Huda (died 2015) was an Indian politician, former Member of Parliament and former Member of the Legislative Assembly of Assam. A leader of the Communist Party of India (Marxist), Nurul Huda belonged to the Central Committee of the party.

== Background ==
Nurul Huda hailed from a Manipuri Muslim (referred to as 'Pangal') family. He was born in Dolugram, a village in the remote parts of Cachar district in Assam. He held engineering and law degrees. Whilst studying engineering at Jadavpur University he came into contact with the communist movement thereby joining the student politics wing of the CPI (M).

== 1974 by-election ==
He contested the 1972 Assam Legislative Assembly election from the Lakhipur seat and finished in second place, with 12,374 votes (38.91%).

Nurul Huda was elected to the Lok Sabha in a by-election in Cachar in early 1974. He defeated the Indian National Congress candidate and former Minister Mahitosh Purkayastha by a margin of 19,944 votes. His victory was declared on 26 February 1974. The by-election had been called following the death of incumbent Congress parliamentarian Jyotsna Chanda.

== MLA ==
In the 1977 Lok Sabha election, Nurul Huda contested the Silchar seat (the Cachar seat had been abolished in delimitation). He faced the Congress Party candidate Rashida Haque Choudhury, widow of Moinul Haque Choudhury. Nurul Huda lost the seat, obtaining 110,085 votes (44.26% of the votes in the constituency). However, he won the Silchar Legislative Assembly seat in the 1978 elections. He obtained 20,409 votes (44.64%), defeating Janata Party candidate Kabindra Purkayastha.

== Later elections ==
Nurul Huda lost the Silchar Legislative Assembly seat in the 1983 election. He finished in third place with 7,296 votes (13.13%). In 1985 Nurul Huda sought to recapture his seat in the Lok Sabha, standing as a candidate in the Silchar constituency (Lok Sabha polls could not be carried out in Assam during the 1984 general election). He finished in second place with 175,711 votes (39.08%), being defeated by Santosh Mohan Dev of the Congress Party. In the 1991 general election Nurul Huda again finished in second place in Silchar, obtaining 193,350 votes (36.81%). He lost to Kabindra Purkayastha (now representing the BJP).

Again, facing Santosh Mohan Dev and Kabindra Purkayastha, Nurul Huda finished third in the Silchar seat in the 1996 Lok Sabha election. He obtained 120,703 votes (21.67%). He again finished third in the 1998 Lok Sabha election in Silchar, obtaining 172,999 votes (27.78%).

CPI(M) fielded the now 74-year-old Nurul Huda in the 2004 Lok Sabha election from Silchar. He finished in fourth place with 20,020 votes.

== Shift to Delhi ==
In 2005 the party relieved Nurul Huda of his responsibilities in Assam, and he shifted to work with the national level office of All India Kisan Sabha (peasants movement) in Delhi. As of 2007 he served as joint secretary and finance secretary of the AIKS. The founding conference of the All India Fishers and Fisheries Workers’ Federation (AIFFWF), held in 2007 (co-organised by AIKS and the Centre of Indian Trade Unions), elected Nurul Huda as its treasurer. The 32nd All India Conference of AIKS, held in 2010, elected Nurul Huda as finance secretary of the organisation.

== Death ==
Nurul Huda died on 17 December 2015, at Ruby Hospital in Kolkata, after having suffered a heart attack two days earlier.
