= Patacharkuchi Assembly constituency =

Coordinates: 26.51°N 91.24°E

Patacharkuchi
- Former constituency No. 42 for the Assam Legislative Assembly

Constituency details
- Country: India
- Region: Northeast India
- State: Assam
- District: Barpeta
- Lok Sabha constituency: Barpeta
- Established: 1951
- Abolished: 2023
- Reservation: None

Patacharkuchi Assembly constituency was one of the 126 constituencies of Assam Legislative Assembly in India. Patacharkuchi formed part of the Barpeta Lok Sabha constituency.

This constituency was abolished in 2023.

== Members of Legislative Assembly ==
Year	Member	Political party
1951	Homeshwar Deb Choudhury	Socialist Party
1951	Baikunthanath Das	Indian National Congress
1957	Birendra Kumar Das	Praja Socialist Party
1957	Surendra Nath Das	Indian National Congress
1962	Homeshwar Deb Choudhury	Praja Socialist Party
1967	Bhubaneswar Barman	Praja Socialist Party
1972	Krishna Kanta Lahkar	Indian National Congress
1978	Bhubaneswar Barman	Janata Party
1983	Rabi Ram Das	Indian National Congress
1985	Pabin Chandra Deka	Independent politician
1991	Krishna Kanta Lahkar	Independent politician
1996	Mohan Das	Asom Gana Parishad
2001	Pabindra Deka	Independent politician
2006	Malaya Borman	Indian National Congress
2011	Manoranjan Das	Bharatiya Janata Party
2016	Pabindra Deka	Asom Gana Parishad
2021	Ranjeet Kumar Dass	Bharatiya Janata Party

== Election results ==
=== 2016 ===
2016 Assam Legislative Assembly election: Patacharkuchi
Party	Candidate	Votes	%	±%
AGP	Pabindra Deka	64,558	61.72	+31.96
INC	Sailen Kalita	12,582	12.03	−8.85
Independent	Kamaleswar Medhi	12,306	11.76	N/A
Independent	Manoranjan Das	8,227	7.86	N/A
Independent	Kartik Deka	3,134	2.99	N/A
Independent	Baikuntha Sarma	960	0.91	N/A
Independent	Puspak Dutta	936	0.89	N/A
Independent	Nilima Bhattacharya	846	0.80	N/A
NOTA	None of the above	1,034	0.98	N/A
Majority		51,976	49.69	+44.49
Turnout		1,04,583	80.84	+9.21
Registered electors		1,29,362		
AGP gain from BJP		Swing		

=== 2011 ===
2011 Assam Legislative Assembly election: Patacharkuchi
Party	Candidate	Votes	%	±%
BJP	Manoranjan Das	30,829	34.96	
AGP	Pabindra Deka	26,248	29.76	
INC	Dr. Moloya Barman	18,418	20.88	
Independent	Dilip Baruah	4,354	4.94	
Independent	Phani Pathak	2,846	3.23	
BPF	Tapan Bhuyan	2,210	2.51	
Independent	Bishaljyoti Kalita	1,587	1.80	
AITC	Ajit Sarma	765	0.87	
Independent	Pradip Kalita	469	0.53	
Independent	Syed Mahimuddin Ahmed	469	0.53	
Majority		4,581	5.20	
Turnout		88,195	71.63	
Registered electors		1,23,128		
BJP gain from INC		Swing		
