= Uddabh Barman =

Indian politician

Uddhab Barman is an Indian communist politician affiliated to the Communist Party of India (Marxist). He is a former Assam State Committee Secretary of the CPI(M) and a Member of the Assam Legislative Assembly, elected from the Sorbhog constituency. He was elected to the Lok Sabha twice from Barpeta, in 1991 and 1996. He was also a member of the Central Committee of CPI(M).

He is married to Madhuri Devi.
