= Moinbari =

Coordinates: 26.255°N 90.737°E

Moinbari is one of the largest villages under Kalgachia Revenue Circle in Barpeta District, Assam. There are 15 parts of this village named as Satra Moinbari, Niz Moinbari, Deoldi Moinbari, Hasinabad Moinbari, Pachim Moinbari, Uttar Moinbari, Kismat Moinbari, Khandakarpara Moinbari, Matinpur Moinbari, Flora Moinbari, Hadirachaki Moinbari, Jaipur Moinbari, Burungipara Moinbari, Palpara Moinbari, Kormkarpara Moinbari and Bazar Moinbari. The village is covered by neighbouring 2 districts Goalpara and Bongaigaon.

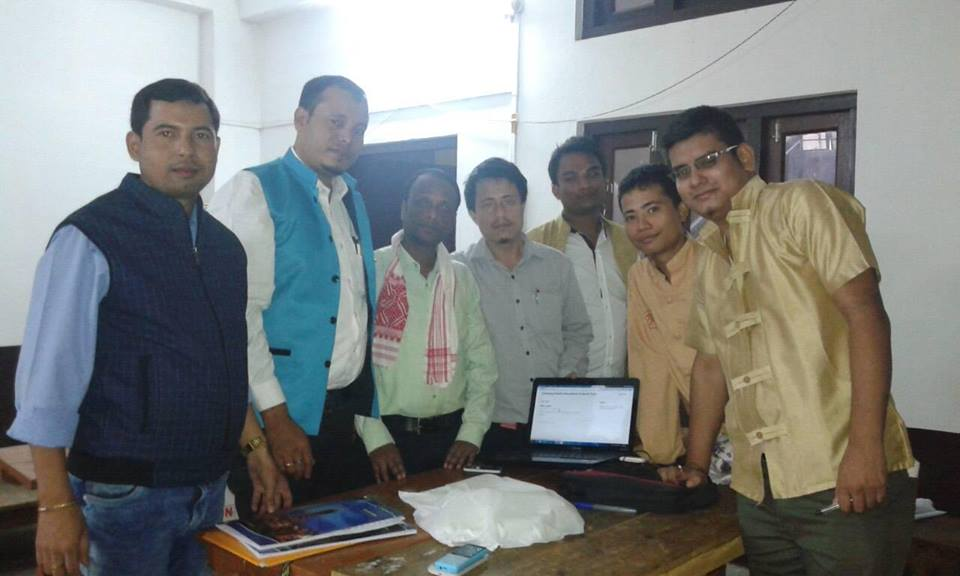
Chaulung Chukafa Web Team has recently visited Moinbari Satra with local youth Main Uddin

== History ==
According to the Assam History the last battle of Ahom King Chandrakanta Singha with Burmese was fought at Hadirachaki and the Burmese soldiers camped in this village ( In Assamese Burmese are called Maan and their staying was Baari). From this view the village was named as Moinbari.

== Population ==
The village carries a mini India as various castes, communities and religious groups people live in this village. However, major portion of the villagers are religiously Muslim. Total population 87,775 where 43,878 males and 43,897 females.

== Education ==
There are 23 Government Lower Primary Schools, 14 Higher Primary schools, 2 High schools and only Pachim Moinbari Higher secondary schools are established by the local people respectively.
