= Karnendu Bhattacharjee =

Indian politician (1938–2022)

Karnendu Bhattacharjee (2 May 1938 – 23 December 2022) was an Indian politician from Assam who served as a Member of the Parliament. A member of the Indian National Congress party, he represented Assam in the Rajya Sabha, the upper house of the Indian Parliament from 1996 to 2008.

Bhattacharjee died on 23 December 2022, at the age of 84.
