= Nibaran Chandra Laskar =

Indian politician (1902–1987)

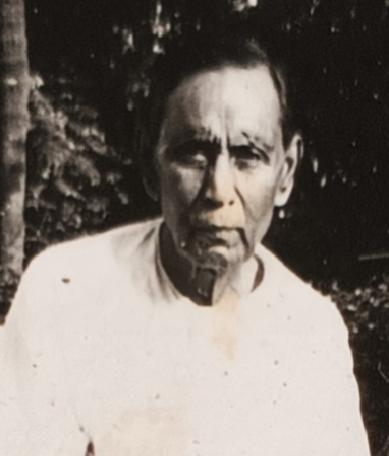
- Prof. Nibaran Chandra Laskar

Member of Parliament, Lok Sabha
- In office 1952–1962
- Constituency: Cachar, Assam
- Constituency: Cachar, Assam

Member of Constituent Assembly of India
- In office 9 December 1946 – 24 January 1950

Personal details
- Born: 14 January 1902 Niz Phulbari, Assam, British India
- Died: 25 June 1987 (aged 85) Silchar
- Party: Indian National Congress
- Spouse: Krishna Kumari Devi (m. 1921)
- Children: 9, including Nihar Ranjan Laskar
- Education: MC College, Dhaka University (MA)

Nibaran Chandra Laskar (14 January 1902 – 25 June 1987) was an Indian singer, musician, sportsman, social worker, professor and politician. He was a member of the Indian National Congress. He was elected to the Lok Sabha, lower house of the Parliament of India, from the Cachar, Assam constituency in 1952 and 1957. Laskar was also a member of the Constituent Assembly of India.

== Early life ==
Nibaran Chandra Laskar was born on 14 January 1902. He was a gold medalist and double MA in Sanskrit and Bengali from Dhaka University.

== Career ==
Nibaran Chandra Laskar was a founder professor of Guru Charan College, the first college of Cachar district in the state of Assam. He was the founder Principle of Cachar college. Prof. Laskar moved into politics in 1944.

He was elected to Assam Legislative Assembly from 1947–1952. He was a member of the drafting committee of the Constituent Assembly of India from 1947–1950, which drafted the Constitution of India.

Laskar was a Member of Parliament of the 1st Lok Sabha from 1952–1957 and was also elected for the 2nd term as an M.P. from 1957–1962.

He was a Member of Silchar Local Board, Silchar Municipal Board from 1946–1949. He served as President of Cachar Kalyan Samiti, from 1946–1948. He was General Secretary of Samaj Sanjivani Samiti, Cachar. He was a member of All India Cottage Industries Board from 1949–1952. He was a member of the F.A.O. from 1950–1952. He was Deputy Minister of Relief and Rehabilitation, Assam Government from 1951–1952. He was a member of Rehabilitation Finance Administration from 1956–1957.

He served on the Public Accounts Committee from 1955–1957.

Laskar was involved in the retention of Cachar (Silchar) and other parts of Barak Valley in India and prevented the region from merging with Pakistan (east) during partition. Azadi Ka Amrit Mahotsav archive (celebrating 75 years of India's independence) documented this contribution.

In 1961, he left politics following a protest against the Assam Assembly's decision to make Assamese the state language of Assambecause Bengali was also a prominent language of the state and 90% of the population of Barak Valley were Bengali speaking. On 19 May 1961, 11 protesters were killed by police firing on a peaceful protest at Silchar Railway Station. MPs and MLAs resigned from their posts after that incident, including Laskar. He was engaged in social service and philanthropy thereafter.

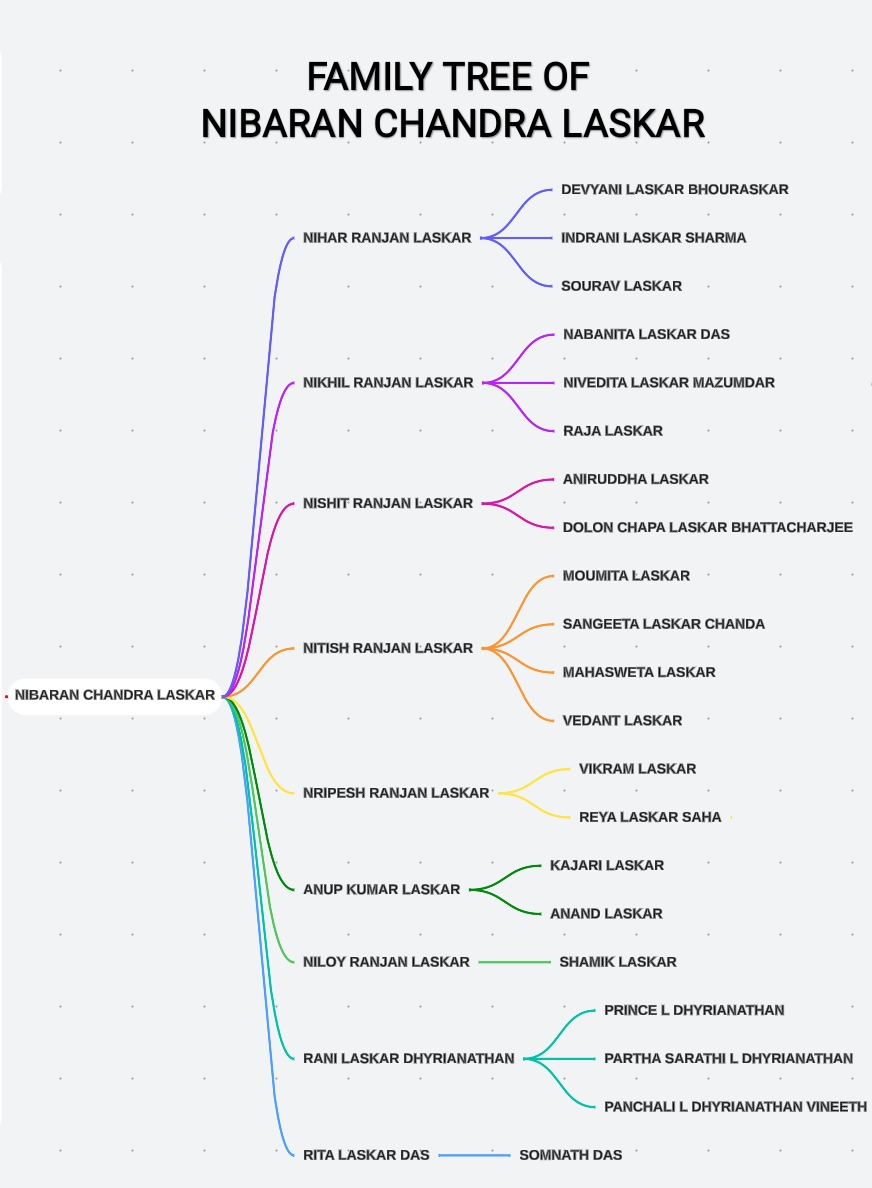
Family Tree of Nibaran Chandra Laskar
