= Sushmita Dev =

Indian politician

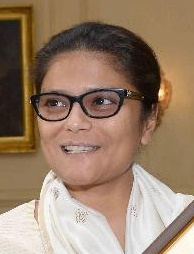
- Sushmita Dev in 2017

Member of Parliament, Rajya Sabha
- Incumbent
- Assumed office 3 April 2024
- Constituency: West Bengal
- Preceded by: Dr. Santanu Sen
- In office 4 October 2021 – 18 August 2023
- Preceded by: Manas Bhunia
- Succeeded by: Samirul Islam

Member of Parliament, Lok Sabha from Assam
- In office 16 May 2014 – 23 May 2019
- Preceded by: Kabindra Purkayastha
- Succeeded by: Rajdeep Roy
- Constituency: Silchar

Member of Assam Legislative Assembly
- In office 13 May 2011 – 16 May 2014
- Preceded by: Bhitika Dev
- Succeeded by: Dilip Kumar Paul
- Constituency: Silchar

President of All India Mahila Congress
- In office 9 September 2017 – 16 August 2021
- President: Rahul Gandhi; Sonia Gandhi
- Preceded by: Shobha Ozha
- Succeeded by: Netta D'Souza

Personal details
- Born: 25 September 1972 (age 54) Silchar, Assam, India
- Party: Bharatiya Janata Party (2026–present)
- Other political affiliations: Trinamool Congress (2021–2026); Indian National Congress (until 2021)
- Parents: Santosh Mohan Dev (father); Bithika Dev (mother)
- Education: University of Delhi (BA, LLB); King's College London (LLM)
- Occupation: Politician

Sushmita Dev (born 25 September 1972) is an Indian politician and a member of Rajya Sabha from West Bengal. Previously, she was elected to the Lok Sabha, lower house of the Parliament of India from Silchar, Assam in the 2014 Indian general election as a member of the Indian National Congress. She is the former president of All India Mahila Congress. She lost the 2019 Lok Sabha election to BJP candidate Rajdeep Roy, which led her to resign from Indian National Congress and join the Trinamool Congress in 2021. She quit the Trinamool Congress in June 2026, joining the Bharatiya Janata Party in July the same year.

== Early life ==
Dev is the daughter of veteran Indian National Congress leader Santosh Mohan Dev and her mother is Bithika Dev, a legislator of Silchar of Assam assembly. Her father was a member of parliament and cabinet minister of India.

She holds a B.A.(Hons.) from Miranda House, Bar-at-Law, an LLB (Corporate and Commercial Laws) from University of Delhi. She enrolled at Inns of Courts School of Law, London and King's College London, UK.

== Elections contested ==
=== Lok Sabha ===
Year	Const.	Party	Votes	%	Opponent	Party	Votes	%	Result	Margin	%
2019	Silchar	INC	417,818	43.99	Rajdeep Roy	BJP	499,414	52.59	Lost	▼81,596	▼8.60
2014	Silchar	INC	336,451	42.07	Kabindra Purkayastha	BJP	301,210	37.66	Won	▲35,241	▲4.41

=== Rajya Sabha ===
Position	Party	Constituency	From	To	Tenure
Member of Parliament, Rajya Sabha (1st Term)	AITC	West Bengal	27 Sept 2021	18 August 2023	1 year, 325 days
Member of Parliament, Rajya Sabha (2nd Term)	AITC	West Bengal	3 April 2024	10 June 2026	2 years, 68 days
Member of Parliament, Rajya Sabha (3rd Term)	BJP	West Bengal	17 July 2026	2 April 2030	3 years, 259 days
