= Kishor Nath =

Indian politician

Member of the Assam Legislative Assembly for Borkhola
- In office 2016–2021
- Preceded by: Bibekananda Dalai

Personal details
- Party: Bharatiya Janata Party

Kishor Nath is a Bharatiya Janata Party politician from Assam, India. He has been elected in Assam Legislative Assembly election in 2016 from Borkhola Assembly constituency.
