= Borkhola Assembly constituency =

Constituency of the Assam legislative assembly in India

Borkhola
- Constituency No. 117 for the Assam Legislative Assembly
- 117-Borkhola within Cachar district

Constituency details
- Country: India
- Region: Northeast India
- State: Assam
- Division: Barak Valley
- District: Cachar
- Lok Sabha constituency: Silchar
- Established: 1951
- Total electors: 206,450
- Reservation: None

Member of Legislative Assembly
- 16th Assam Legislative Assembly
- Incumbent Kishor Nath
- Party: BJP
- Alliance: NDA
- Elected year: 2026
- Preceded by: Misbahul Islam Laskar (INC)

Borkhola State assembly constituency is one of the 126 state legislative assembly constituencies in Assam, India. It is one of the seven assembly segments that constitute the Silchar Lok Sabha constituency. Since 2026, it has been represented by Kishor Nath of the Bharatiya Janata Party.

Established in 1951, the constituency was redrawn during the 2023 delimitation exercise. It is now an all-rural constituency comprising several rural areas of the Cachar district.

Most Successful parties from Borkhola Assembly Constituency Since 1952
1. INC (9 times) (64.3%)
2. BJP (3 times) (21.4%)
3. JD (1 time) (7.14%)
4. JP (1 time) (7.14%)

== Local self-governed segments ==
Borkhola Assembly constituency is composed of the following local self-governed segments:

- Tapang Development Block
- Barjalenga Development Block
  - Silcoorie Gram Panchayat
  - Tarutajbari Gram Panchayat
  - Ghungoor West Gram Panchayat
  - Bhorakai Gram Panchayat
- Borkhola Development Block
- Kalain Development Block
  - Behara Gram Panchayat
  - Burunga Gram Panchayat
  - Sewti Gram Panchayat
- Katigorah Development Block
  - Dudpur Ganirgram Gram Panchayat
- Salchapra Development Block
- Silchar Development Block
  - Bhajantipur Gram Panchayat
- Sonai Development Block
  - Dakshin Saidpur Gram Panchayat
  - Sildubi Gram Panchayat
  - Dakshin Krishnapur Gram Panchayat
  - Uttar Krishnapur Gram Panchayat
- Narsingpur Development Block
  - Clever House Gram Panchayat

== Members of Legislative Assembly ==
The following list contains all members of Assam Legislative Assembly who have represented Borkhola Assembly constituency during the period of various assemblies:

Year	Winner	Party
2026	Kishor Nath	Bharatiya Janata Party
2021	Misbahul Islam Laskar	Indian National Congress
2016	Kishor Nath	Bharatiya Janata Party
2011	Rumi Nath	Indian National Congress
2006	Rumi Nath	Bharatiya Janata Party
2001	Misbahul Islam Laskar	Indian National Congress
1996	Misbahul Islam Laskar	Indian National Congress
1991	Abdul Matin Mazumdar	Janata Dal
1985	Altaf Hussain Mazumdar	Indian National Congress
1983	Altaf Hussain Mazumdar	Indian National Congress
1978	A. F. Golam Osmani	Janata Party
1972	Dr. Lutfur Rahman	Indian National Congress
1967	Altaf Hussain Mazumdar	Indian National Congress
1952	Raichand Nath	Indian National Congress

== Election results ==
=== 2026 ===
2026 Assam Legislative Assembly election: Borkhola
Party	Candidate	Votes	%	±%
BJP	Kishor Nath	102,775	58.02	▲11.90
INC	Amit Kumar Kalwar	66,162	37.35	▼14.42
Independent	Amalendu Das	3,713	2.10	New entry
NOTA	None of the above	1,447	0.82	▼0.07
Margin of victory		36,613	20.67	▲15.02
Turnout		1,77,149	85.81	▲4.34
Registered electors		206,450		▲35.15
BJP gain from INC		Swing	▲13.16	

=== 2021 ===
2021 Assam Legislative Assembly election: Barkhola
Party	Candidate	Votes	%	±%
INC	Misbahul Islam Laskar	64,433	51.77	▲30.78
BJP	Amalendu Das	57,402	46.12	▲11.22
NOTA	None of the above	1,105	0.89	▼0.66
Margin of victory		7,031	5.65	▲5.61
Turnout		124,454	81.47	▲1.11
Registered electors		152,761		▲17.43
INC gain from BJP		Swing	▲21.00	

=== 2016 ===
2016 Assam Legislative Assembly election: Barkhola
Party	Candidate	Votes	%	±%
BJP	Kishor Nath	36,482	34.90	
Independent	Misbahul Islam Laskar	36,440	34.86	
INC	Dr. Rumi Nath	21,946	20.99	
AIUDF	Jahurul Islam Barbhuiya	4,051	3.88	
CPI(M)	Chunilal Bhattacharjee	2,438	2.33	
NOTA	None of the above	1,621	1.55	
Majority		42	0.04	
Turnout		1,04,534	80.36	
Registered electors		1,30,082		
BJP gain from INC		Swing		
