= Manjula Devi =

Indian politician

Member of Parliament, Lok Sabha
- In office 1957-1962
- Constituency: Goalpara, Assam

Personal details
- Born: 5 January 1912 Pithapuram, Godavari District, Madras Presidency, British India(present-day Andhra Pradesh, India)
- Party: Indian National Congress
- Spouse: Raja of Sidh (m. 1932)
- Children: one

Rani Manjula Devi was an Indian politician, daughter of the Rajah of Pithapuram. She was elected to the Lok Sabha, lower house of the Parliament of India from Goalpara, Assam as a member of the Indian National Congress. She was a student of the Church Park Convent in Madras. She married the Raja of Sidhli Raja Ajit Narayan Dev in 1932.
