= Jyotsna Chanda =

Indian politician

Jyotsna Chanda (1904–1973) was a politician, member of the Congress Party and a Parliamentarian who served as a member from Assam. She served in the Third and Fourth Lok Sabha, from 1962 to 1967 and 1967–1970, respectively.

== Early life and education ==
She was born on 28 March 1904 in Silchar, Assam, to late Shri Mahesh Chandra Datta.

She did her schooling from Mission Girls' High School, Silchar, and graduated from Diocesan College, Calcutta, with a B.A. degree.

== Career ==
She was appointed Jail Visitor of the District Jail in 1931–32, being the first woman Jail Visitor in Assam. She served as the Chairman of four organisations- Silchar School Board, Silchar District Social Welfare Advisory Board, N.E.F. Railway Employees Union, and Tea Employees' Union.

She was elected first President of the Bengali Speaking People's Association of Assam, in 1960. She was a member of the following organisations- Silchar Municipal Board, Gauhati University Court, Assam State Text Book Committee, Assam State Advisory Board for Social Education, and Assam State Advisory Board for Women's Education.

She was elected as an MLA in Assam from 1957 to 1961 but resigned in 1961 as a protest against police firing at Silchar on Satyagrahis on 9 May 1961. She contested in the Lok Sabha elections in 1962 and 1967, and won.

She was associated with nearly all educational institutions and social welfare organisations in the District Silchar. During her lifetime, she presided over Silchar B.T. College Managing Committee and

== Personal life ==
She married Shri Arun Kumar Chanda in 1927, but was widowed later, after which she started doing social work.
