= Santosh Mohan Dev =

Indian politician

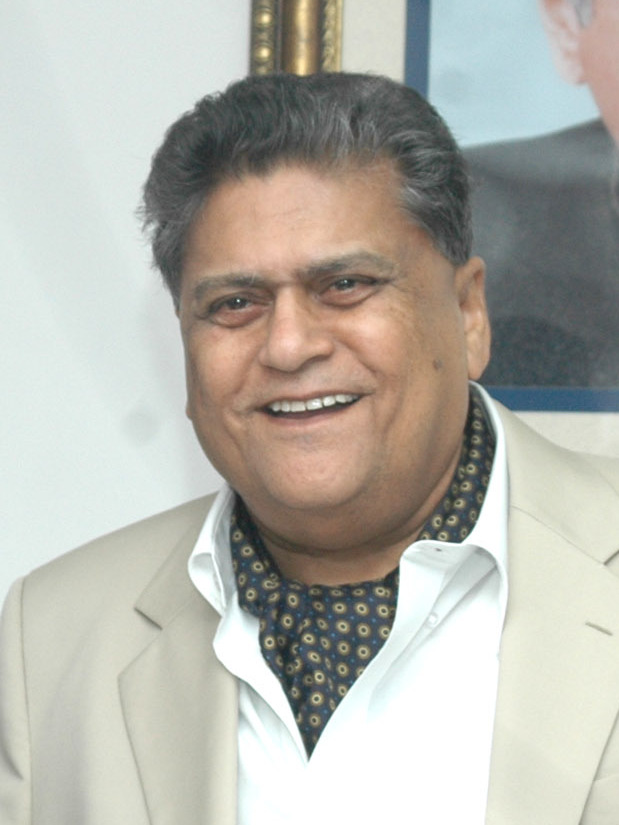
- Dev in 2007

Minister of Heavy Industries and Public Enterprises
- In office 2005 – 2008
- Prime Minister: Manmohan Singh
- Preceded by: Sushilkumar Shinde
- Succeeded by: Praful Patel

Minister of Water Resources
- Additional Charge; 18 November 2005 – 28 January 2006
- Prime Minister: Manmohan Singh
- Preceded by: Priya Ranjan Dasmunsi
- Succeeded by: Saifuddin Soz

Minister of State, Government of India
- In office 1986 – 1989
- Prime Minister: Rajiv Gandhi
- Oct. 1986 to Feb. 1988: Ministry of Tourism and Ministry of Communications
- Feb. 1988 to June 1988: Ministry of Defence
- June 1988 to Dec. 1989: Ministry of Home Affairs
- In office 1991 – 1996
- Prime Minister: P. V. Narasimha Rao
- Department: Steel (Independent Charge)
- In office 23 May 2004 – 17 November 2005
- Prime Minister: Manmohan Singh
- Department: Heavy Industries and Public Enterprises (Independent Charge)

Member of Parliament, Lok Sabha
- In office 1980–1989; 1996–1998; 1999–2009
- Preceded by: Kabindra Purkayastha
- Succeeded by: Kabindra Purkayastha
- Constituency: Silchar, Assam
- In office 1989–1996
- Preceded by: Ajoy Biswas
- Succeeded by: Badal Choudhury
- Constituency: Tripura West, Tripura

Personal details
- Born: 1 April 1934 Silchar, Assam Province, British India
- Died: 2 August 2017 (aged 83) Silchar, Assam, India
- Party: Indian National Congress
- Spouse: Bithika Dev
- Children: 4 daughters including Sushmita Dev
- As of 25 February, 2006

Santosh Mohan Dev (1 April 1934 – 2 August 2017), was an Indian political leader and a key member of the Indian National Congress. Dev was first elected to the Parliament in 1980, the first of his seven terms as the Member of Parliament, Lok Sabha. Out of these seven, he has represented Silchar constituency, Assam five times and he was elected from Tripura West constituency twice. Dev has the rare distinction of being elected from two different states.

Dev with Prime Minister Rajiv Gandhi

== Political career ==
During his political career as an elected representative, Dev held crucial cabinet and non Cabinet posts. Dev had represented India in the Population Conference held in China in 1982 and was a member of the Indian Parliamentary Delegation to Commonwealth Parliamentary Conference at Isle of Man in 1984. He was the Union Minister of State for Tourism and Communications during 1986-1988 and the Union Minister of State for Home Affairs during 1988–1989. He also held the charge of Union Minister of State for Steel (Independent Charge) in 1991. Dev was elected to the Lok Sabha for the first time in 1980 from Silchar constituency in Assam. Subsequently, he was re-elected to Lok Sabha in 1984 from Silchar constituency and in 1989 and 1991 from Tripura West constituency. Dev was again elected to the Lok Sabha in 1996, 1999 and 2004 from Silchar constituency. Dev was Chairman, Public Accounts Committee during 1990-1991 and was a member of the Parliamentary Committee of General Purpose Committee. He was also member of Tea Board during 1981–83. Between 1999-2004 Dev held various parliamentary responsibilities including being the Chairman of Committee on Energy, Member of House Committee and Member of General Purposes Committee. Santosh Mohan Dev lost to Kabindra Purkayastha of the BJP in the 2009 elections for the 15th Lok Sabha.

Santosh Mohan Dev was minister of state for communication in the mid eighties (seen here in the mid eighties initiating the laying of cables across the Arabian Sea)

== Achievements ==
During the period 2005 to 2009, he was the Minister of Heavy Industry and Public Enterprises in the Union Cabinet. His tenure saw the fruition of a comprehensive automotive policy that will shape the Indian auto industry in the decades to come. This period also saw the rationalisation of Public Sector wages. this brought employees of government run companies closer to the levels of their private counterparts and drastically reduced the exodus of talented managers and executives. His other salient achievements include, the deregulation of steel in the mid 1990s as minister of steel which unshackled potential of the indigenous steel industry making India a global steel powerhouse. He was also instrumental in setting up a national university in Silchar, Assam. He played a key role in the freight equalisation scheme in the early 1990s in India which removed unequal rail freight charges among the states, thereby making them more competitive.

He was a third generation Congressman. His father was one of the first legislators of independent India. His grandfather Kali Mohan Dev was also an active member of the Indian freedom struggle and a member of the first ever Silchar Municipal council in 1913.

== Social and cultural Activities ==
Dev was instrumental in several major initiatives, such as establishment of two Central Universities in Assam; welfare of labour especially of workers in tea gardens and villages; flood cyclone relief work; served the rural people of Assam with District Rural Development Agency (D.R.D.A.) Loans; development of rural electrification and transport; provision of water, electricity and sanitation facilities to the slum dwellers; instrumental in extending financial help to the needy individuals and Associations/Clubs through a Trust established in memory of his father Late Shri Satindra Mohan Dev; and developed Silchar Regional Engineering College into an institution of repute; president, Nikhil Bharat Banga Sahitya Sammelani for 2 years; Chief Patron, Bipin Chandra Pal Trust; engaged in Socio-welfare activities established in memory of noted freedom fighter from North-East Region; took initiative in establishing Gas-based Power project at Adamtilla and Banskandi; actively involved in the construction of Barak Dam and extension of the broad-gauge line up to Silchar.

Santosh was in the Manmohan Singh cabinet as minister of heavy industries and public enterprise. Despite having to contend with the strident left allies, he still managed to devolve considerable powers of decision making from the government to the management of PSUs

== Personal life ==
Santosh Mohan Dev is the eldest of three sons of the renowned Bengali North Eastern Freedom Fighter Satindra Mohan Dev. Satindra Mohan Dev was known as fierce opponent of British Rule and enjoyed the personal confidence of Jawaharlal Nehru. He was jailed a number of times by the British for his resistance activities. In the mid Sixties in an independent India he was offered the governorship of Bihar, but he turned it down, preferring to stay in his hometown of Silchar. A member of the Dev family has occupied an elected office from South Assam for all but 10 years since Indian Independence.

Santosh Mohan Dev was educated at G.C college in Silchar, Assam and has an MBA from the Welsh College In Cardiff UK. Shri Dev has four daughters and his wife Bithika Dev was a Member of the state legislative assembly of Assam from his home constituency of Silchar till May 2011. Mr. Dev is also a certified and professionally qualified Football Referee. In his earlier years Mr. Dev was also the winner of the All Assam Lawn Tennis Championship. An avid reader, Mr Dev is personally inspired by Famous Bengali writers like Bankim Chandra Chatterjee and Rabindranath Tagore. In September 2009 his daughter Sushmita Dev was elected chairperson of the Silchar Municipality making her the fourth generation of the Dev family to enter active politics. In March 2011, Sushmita Dev became the MLA of Assam Legislative Assembly from Silchar constituency and in 2014 she became the member of parliament from her hometown Silchar constituency.

Lok Sabha
Preceded by Rashida Choudhury	Member of Parliament for Silchar; 1980 – 1989	Succeeded by Kabindra Purkayastha
Preceded by Ajoy Biswas	Member of Parliament for Tripura West; 1989 – 1996	Succeeded by Badal Choudhury
Preceded by Kabindra Purkayastha	Member of Parliament for Silchar; 1996 – 1998	Succeeded by Kabindra Purkayastha
Preceded by Kabindra Purkayastha	Member of Parliament for Silchar; 1999 – 2009	Succeeded by Kabindra Purkayastha
Political offices
Preceded by Subodh Mohite	Minister of Heavy Industries and Public Enterprises; 2004 - 2009	Succeeded by Vilasrao Deshmukh
