= Kabindra Purkayastha =

Indian politician (1931–2026)

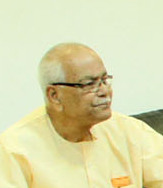
- Kabindra Purkayastha in 2016

Minister of State for Communications Government of India
- In office 20 March 1998 – 13 October 1999
- Prime Minister: Atal Bihari Vajpayee
- Preceded by: Beni Prasad Verma
- Succeeded by: Tapan Sikdar

Member of Parliament, Lok Sabha
- In office 16 May 2009 – 16 May 2014
- Preceded by: Santosh Mohan Dev
- Succeeded by: Sushmita Dev
- Constituency: Silchar
- In office 10 March 1998 – 26 April 1999
- Preceded by: Santosh Mohan Dev
- Succeeded by: Santosh Mohan Dev
- Constituency: Silchar
- In office 20 June 1991 – 10 May 1996
- Preceded by: Santosh Mohan Dev
- Succeeded by: Santosh Mohan Dev
- Constituency: Silchar

Personal details
- Born: 15 December 1931 Kamarkhal, Sylhet district, Assam Province, British India
- Died: 7 January 2026 (aged 94) Silchar, Assam, India
- Party: Bharatiya Janata Party
- Children: Kanad Purkayastha

Kabindra Purkayastha (15 December 1931 – 7 January 2026) was an Indian politician who was union minister of state. He served as minister of state for communication in Atal Bihari Vajpayee government from 1998 to 1999. He was a senior leader of Bharatiya Janata Party in Assam, India.

His son Kanad Purkayastha is a current Member of Parliament, Rajya Sabha from Assam.

== Early life ==
Purkayastha was born on 15 December 1931 in Kamarkhal in Sylhet district (now in Bangladesh). He studied M.A. at Gauhati University. He also worked as the Principal of Ramkrishna Vidyapeeth of Sribhumi.

== Political career ==
Purkayastha joined RSS in 1950 and held various positions in the organisation. He was instrumental in spreading the ideology of RSS in the Northeast, joined BJP in 1980 as one of the founder members of the party. He was first elected to Lok Sabha in 1991 from Silchar constituency in Assam. He was re-elected to the Lok Sabha in 1998 from the same constituency. In 2009, he was elected to the 15th Lok Sabha, defeating heavyweight candidates Santosh Mohan Dev of INC and Badruddin Ajmal of AUDF from Silchar. But in the 2014 LS-election, he was defeated by Sushmita Dev (INC), daughter of Santosh Mohan Dev, despite the Modi-wave in his favour. He was awarded an honorary doctorate degree in September 2024 for his contribution to social life. He was also known as the Patriarch of the Bharatiya Janata Party - Assam.

== Death ==
Purkayastha died on 7 January 2026, at the age of 94.
