= Sarbhog =

- town
- Location in Assam, India Sarbhog (India)
- Coordinates: 26.491°N 90.888°E
- Country: India
- State: Assam
- District: Barpeta

Government
  - Body: Sarbhog Town Committee
- Elevation: 50 m (160 ft)

Population (2001)
  - Total: 7,553

Languages
  - Official: Assamese
- Time zone: UTC+5:30 (IST)
- PIN: 781317
- Vehicle registration: AS-15

Sarbhog {IPA:ˈsə(r)ˌbɒg} (also spelt as Sorbhog) is a town and a town area committee in Barpeta district in the Indian state of Assam. It is located on the banks of river Beki and contains a temple dedicated to Krishna known as "Gorokhiya Gohainr Than", which is a site of pilgrimage. Travel to Sarbhog is facilitated by train and the National Highway 31.

Sorbhog is located at 26.50°N 90.87°E. It has an average elevation of 50 m (160 ft).

The name suggests that there is abundance of milk and milk products in this town, and Sorbhog is known for the milk cream and curd produced locally.

As of 2001 India census, Sorbhog had a population of 7553. Males constitute 51% of the population and females 49%. Sorbhog has an average literacy rate of 78%, higher than the national average of 59.5%: male literacy is 83%, and female literacy is 72%. In Sorbhog, 10% of the population is under 6 years of age.

== Politics ==
Sorbhog is part of Kokrajhar (Lok Sabha constituency).
