= Jainism in Assam =

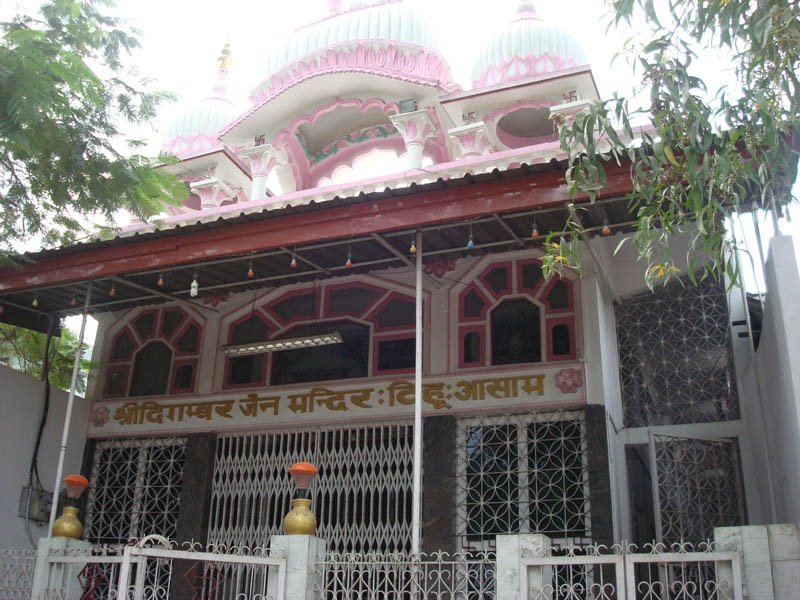
Jain temple in Tihu, Nalbari district

Assam, a state in north eastern India has had a long association with Jainism. Today the state is home to a number of Jain monuments, such as Jain temples and Jain tirths.

== History ==
Surya Pahar in the Goalpara district of Assam has several Jain statues and relics.

One of the oldest Jain temples in Guwahati was established in 1965 in the Fancy Bazar locality.

== Community ==
Jainism is one of the smallest religions in Assam and constitutes 0.09% of the total population. The Government of Assam has officially declared the Jain community in Assam as a minority community.

The Assamese Jain community actively takes part in community service. They regularly organize free health camps.

== Major centers ==
Major ancient Jain centers include:

- Sri Surya Pahar

== Population by district ==
Jain population in Assam (2011)
#	District	Total population	Jain population	%
1	Kamrup Metropolitan	1,253,938	9,250	0.74%
2	Dhubri	1,949,258	1,846	0.09%
3	Cachar	1,736,617	1,673	0.10%
4	Kamrup	1,517,542	1,330	0.09%
5	Nagaon	2,823,768	1,162	0.04%
6	Dibrugarh	1,326,335	1,055	0.08%
7	Nalbari	771,639	1,004	0.13%
8	Sonitpur	1,924,110	1,003	0.05%
9	Bongaigaon	738,804	871	0.12%
10	Tinsukia	1,327,929	837	0.06%
11	Darrang	928,500	724	0.08%
12	Jorhat	1,092,256	719	0.07%
13	Golaghat	1,066,888	530	0.05%
14	Karimganj	1,228,686	524	0.04%
15	Goalpara	1,008,183	477	0.05%
16	Barpeta	1,693,622	399	0.02%
17	Karbi Anglong	956,313	397	0.04%
18	Kokrajhar	887,142	396	0.04%
19	Sivasagar	1,151,050	286	0.02%
20	Lakhimpur	1,042,137	250	0.02%
21	Hailakandi	659,296	247	0.04%
22	Morigaon	957,423	244	0.03%
23	Baksa	950,075	239	0.03%
24	Dhemaji	686,133	167	0.02%
25	Chirang	482,162	125	0.03%
26	Udalguri	831,668	124	0.01%
27	Dima Hasao	214,102	70	0.03%
	Assam (Total)	31,205,576	25,949	0.08%

== See also ==
- Jainism in West Bengal
- Jainism in India
- Jainism in Tamil Nadu
- Jainism in Kerala
- Jainism in Bundelkhand
