= Trinamool =

Trinamool (alternatively spelt Trinamul, Trinomool, or Trinomul) is a word in Indic languages meaning grassroots. Various political parties have used this word within their names:

- All India Trinamool Congress, a national political party in India, prominent in West Bengal
  - Mamata All India Trinamool Congress, a faction of the political party led by Mamata Banerjee since a 2026 split
  - Democratic Trinamool Congress, a faction of the political party led by Ritabrata Banerjee since a 2026 split
- Trinamool Gana Parishad, an Indian political party in Assam
- Trinomool BNP, a Bangladeshi political party
