= Bhumidhar Barman =

12th Chief Minister of Assam (1931–2021)

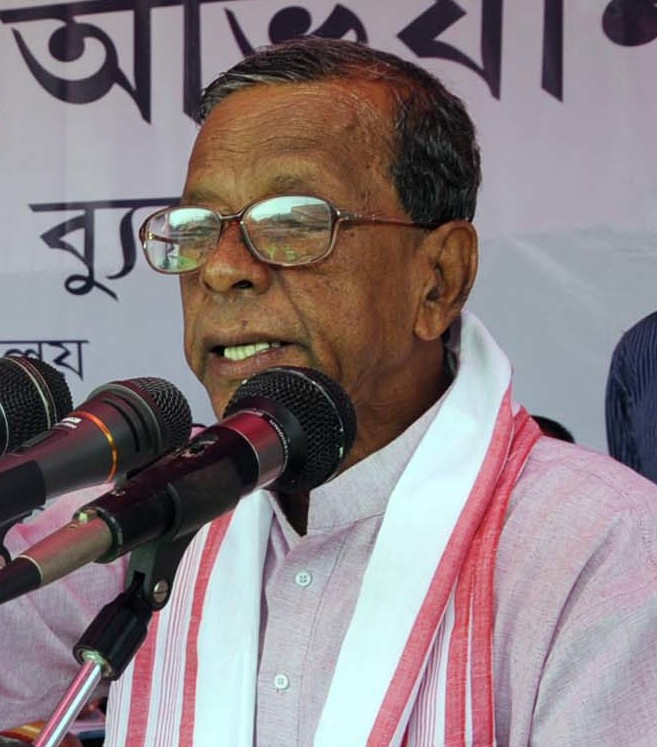
- Barman in 2013

12th Chief Minister of Assam
- In office 22 April 1996 – 14 May 1996
- Preceded by: Hiteswar Saikia
- Succeeded by: Prafulla Kumar Mahanta

Minister for Revenue and Disaster Management, Administrative Reforms and Training
- In office 22 January 2015 – 24 May 2016
- Chief Minister: Tarun Gogoi

Minister for Revenue & DM
- In office 2006 - 2011
- Chief Minister: Tarun Gogoi

Minister for Health & FW
- In office 2001 - 2006
- Chief Minister: Tarun Gogoi

Minister for Education, Health & Panchayat
- In office 1991 - 22 April 1996
- Chief Minister: Hiteswar Saikia

Minister of State for Revenue and Education
- In office 1973 - 1978
- Chief Minister: Sarat Chandra Singha

Member of Assam Legislative Assembly
- In office 2001 - 2016
- Constituency: Barkhetry
- In office 1991 - 1996
- Constituency: Barkhetry
- In office 1983 - 1985
- Constituency: Dharmapur
- In office 1967 - 1978
- Constituency: Nalbari West

Personal details
- Born: 12 October 1931 Belsor, Assam, British India
- Died: 18 April 2021 (aged 89) Dispur, Assam, India
- Party: Indian National Congress
- Spouse: Malati Barman
- Children: 3 daughters,1 son Diganta Barman
- Parent: Bhakat Ram Barman (Father) Mathupriya Barman (Mother)

Bhumidhar Barman (12 October 1931 – 18 April 2021) was an Indian politician belonging to the Indian National Congress. He was the shortest-serving Chief Minister of Assam, his tenure lasting only 22 days, from 22 April 1996 to 14 May 1996. First elected to the Assam Legislative Assembly in 1967, he became a member of that assembly a total of seven times. In 2015, he was made a Cabinet Minister of Assam.

== Early life and education ==
Bhumidhar Barman was born on 12 October 1931 to the late Bhakat Ram Barman and the late Mathupriya Barman in Belsor. He passed his matriculation from Tihu High School in 1951. His father, the late Bhakat Ram Barman, was a well-established businessman of his area. He completed his schooling at Tihu High school, thereafter at Cotton College and finally his MBBS degree from Assam Medical College. He was among the last batch of students to have passed out from Calcutta University. Initially he started practising nearby his village people, who were deprived of the medical facility, and soon became famous as Bhumi Doctor.

== Political career ==
He joined the Indian National Congress in 1967 and got elected from the then west Nalbari constituency again in 1972. He again was elected in 1983 but for Dharmapur. After Hiteshwar Saikia's death, he was made Chief Minister for a serving of twenty two days before being succeeded by Prafulla Kumar Mahanta. He was again elected to the Assembly in 1991 for Barkherty and again in 2001 until 2016. Barman was made a minister many times throughout his career. Barman was the oldest member in the council of ministers of Assam in 2010. He was made acting Chief Minister when Tarun Gogoi was hospitalised in Mumbai for heart surgery.

=== Electoral history ===
Year	Constituency	Party	Votes	%	Opponent		Result	Margin
1967	Nalbari West	INC	10,776	34.04%	Tarun Sen Deka	CPI	Won	1,028
1972	Nalbari West	INC	22,596	58.33%	Tarun Sen Deka	CPI	Won	8,505
1978	Dharmapur	INC	11,832	30.1%	Ramani Barman	JP	Lost	3,363
1983	Dharmapur	INC	266	100%	Jogen Barman	CPI	Won	0
1985	Dharmapur	INC	11,556	18.8%	Chandra Mohan Patowary	AGP	Lost	35,287
1991	Barkhetry	INC	30,243	40.3%	Pulakesh Barua	NAGP	Won	1,907
1996	Barkhetry	INC	40,166	44.8%	Pulakesh Barua	AGP	Lost	6,762
2001	Barkhetry	INC	64,748	66.9%	Pulakesh Barua	IND	Won	35,925
2006	Barkhetry	INC	55,210	45.9%	Pulakesh Barua	TGP	Won	17,209
2011	Barkhetry	INC	53,958	45.5%	Pulakesh Barua	AGP	Won	6,346

== Personal life ==
Barman married Malati Barman, and they had 1 son and 3 daughters. His daughters are Dipali Barman, Reena Barman Kalita and Rita Barman Hazarika. His son, Diganta Barman contested for the Barkherty seat in 2016 but lost. However, he won in 2021.

== Death ==
Barman had been admitted to Dispur Hospital on March 13. He had been suffering from chronic kidney disease and other heart issues. He was put into the ICU under ventilation. Senior congress leaders such as Rispun Bora visited him.

Barman died at 6:23 pm on 18 April 2021. Many politicians, such as Narendra Modi, Venkaiah Naidu, Sarbananda Sonowal, Himanta Biswa Sarma, Ripun Bora, Keshab Mahanta, Debabrata Saikia, Lurinjyoti Gogoi, Chandra Mohan Patowary, Jitendra Singh, Abdul Khalque, Pradyut Bordoloi, Bhupen Kumar Borah, Badruddin Ajmal, Raijor Dal all paid tribute.

The State Government declared a three-day state mourning period where the national flag was flown half-mast in all offices where it was flown regularly and no official entertainment was held.

Assam police gave a 21-gun salute to the Congress stalwart at the funeral, which was attended by Sarbananda Sonowal, Ranjeet Kumar Dass, Ripun Bora, Barman's son Diganta and other politicians. Diganta performed his last rites with all family members present. The body of Barman was brought to his village in a vehicle decorated with flowers. Before bringing the body to his native village, Barman's body was taken to the Assam Legislative Assembly where Cabinet minister Chandra Mohan Patowary, Chief Secretary Jishnu Barua and DGP Bhaskar Jyoti Mahanta paid tributes to Barman. His body was next taken to the congress headquarters, Nalbari Deputy Commissioner's Office, and Rajiv Bhawan where people paid tribute to the Chief minister.

Political offices
Preceded by Hiteswar Saikia	Chief Minister of Assam; 22 April 1996 - 14 May 1996	Succeeded by Prafulla Kumar Mahanta
