= Sheikh Chand Mohammad =

Indian lawyer and politician (1931–2019)

Speaker of the Assam Legislative Assembly
- In office 7 November 1979 – 7 January 1986
- Preceded by: Jogendra Nath Hazarika
- Succeeded by: Pulakesh Barua

Deputy Speaker of the Assam Legislative Assembly
- In office 30 March 1978 – 6 November 1979
- Preceded by: G. C. Rajbongshi
- Succeeded by: G. Ahmed

MLA of Barkhetry
- In office 1978–1985
- Preceded by: Constituency Established
- Succeeded by: Pulakesh Barua

Personal details
- Born: 1 March 1931
- Died: 11 May 2019 (aged 88)
- Party: Indian National Congress

Sheikh Chand Mohammad (1 March 1931 – 11 May 2019) was an Indian lawyer and politician belonging to Indian National Congress. He was elected twice as a member of Assam Legislative Assembly. He also served first as the deputy speaker and then speaker of the Assam Legislative Assembly.

== Biography ==
Chand Mohammad was born on 1 March 1931, to Aladar Ali and Fulashree Bibi. He studied first at Cotton College and subsequently at B. Borooah College. He pursued a law degree from the latter institution. After completing study he practised law at the Gauhati High Court.

Chand Mohammad elected as a member of Assam Legislative Assembly from Barkhetry in 1978. Later, he was appointed deputy speaker of the Assam Legislative Assembly on 30 March 1978. He served as deputy speaker of the Assam Legislative Assembly from 30 March 1978 to 6 November 1979. Then he was appointed speaker of the Assam Legislative Assembly on 7 November 1979. He served as speaker of the Assam Legislative Assembly from 7 November 1979 to 7 January 1986. He was also elected as a member of Assam Legislative Assembly from Barkhetry in 1983.

Chand Mohammad died on 11 May 2019 at the age of 88.
