= Chakradhar Deka =

Indian film director and writer (1963–2007)

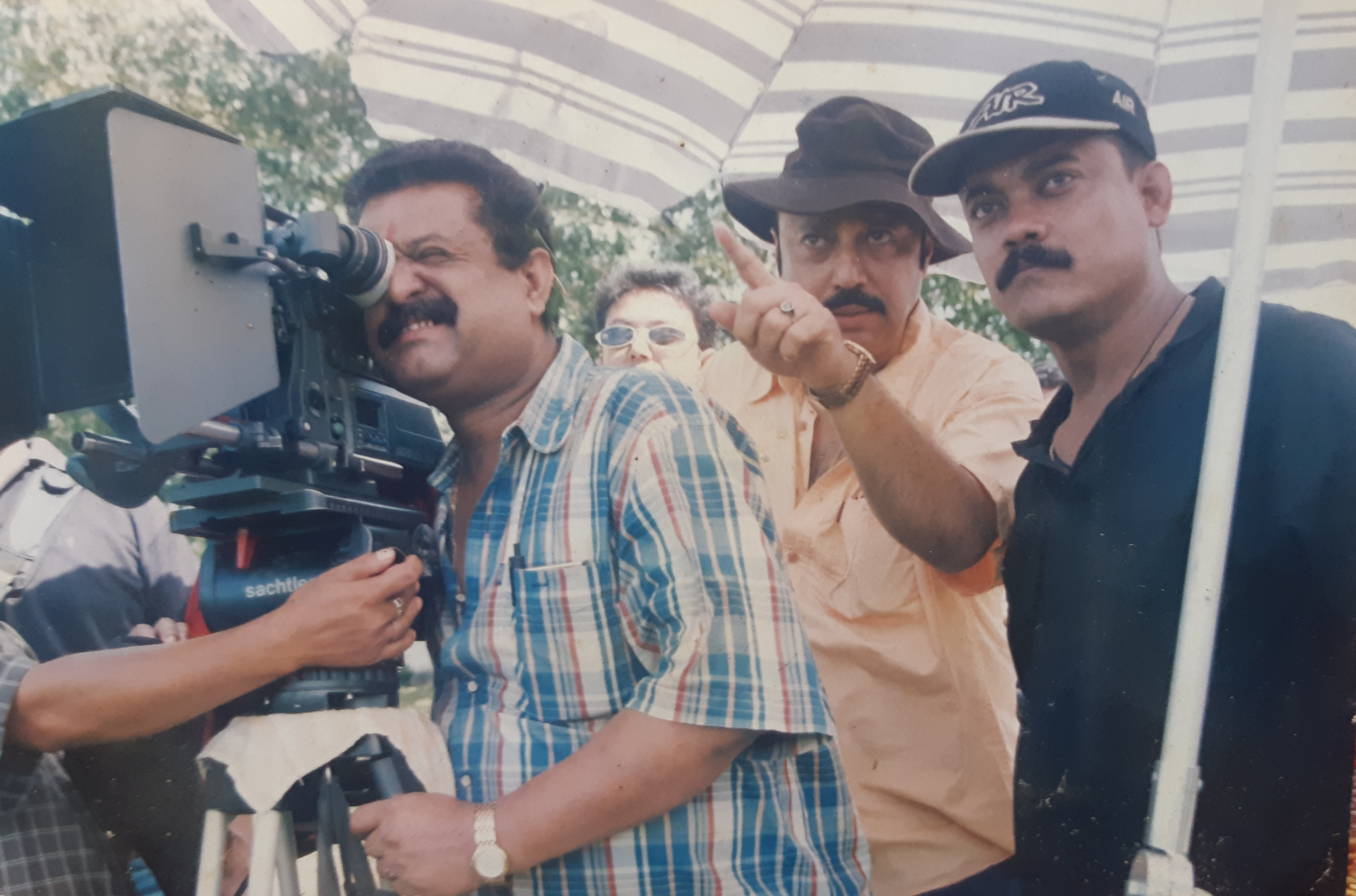
- Deka with director Taufik Rahman on the set of Bandhan (2001)
- Born: 3 September 1963; Nalbari, Assam, India
- Died: 30 December 2007 (aged 44)
- Occupation: Filmmaker
- Relatives: Narayan Deka (brother)

Chakradhar Deka (3 September 1963 – 30 December 2007) was an Indian film director, producer, screenwriter, author, entrepreneur and a social activist from Assam. He was the founder of Rajkumar Film Production and Rajashree Theatre.

He was the elder brother of politician Narayan Deka.

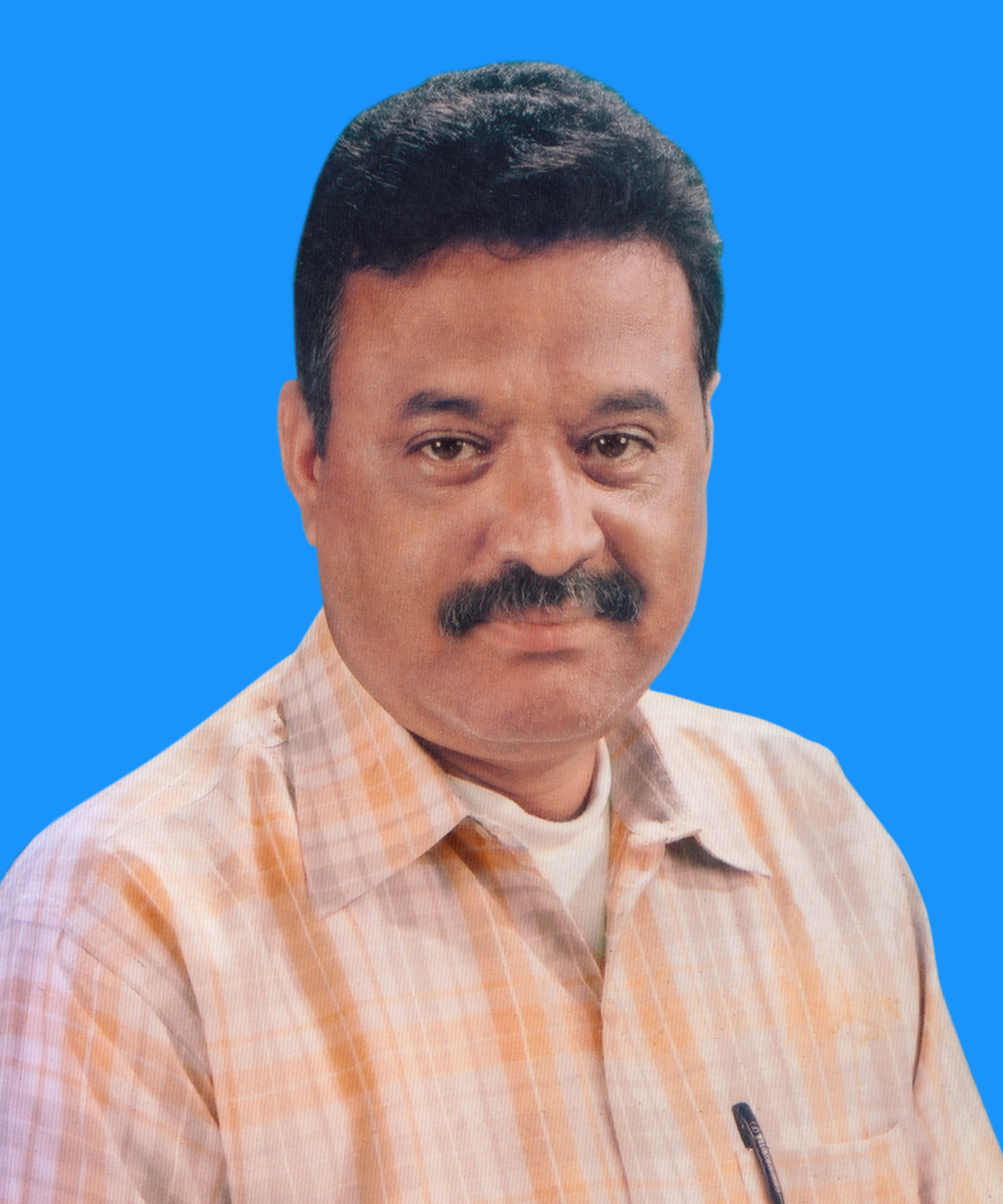
Chakradhar Deka (2007)

== Early life ==
Chakradhar Deka was born on 3 September 1963 in Mukalmua (Nalbari, Assam). He was a part of the Assam Movement and had served as an advisor in the Barkhetri Anchalik Students Organization.

Deka was also a registered Class 1(A) contractor under Public Works Department of Assam.

== Filmography ==
Deka entered the film industry in the early 2000s. He worked with popular artists like Jatin Bora, Ravi Sarma, Angoorlata Deka, Aimee Baruah, Zubeen Garg and Shaan.

Year	Film	Role
2000	Ahankaar	Producer
2001	Prem Bhora Shokulu	Executive Producer
2001	Aei Morom Tumar Babey	Producer
2003	Bandhan	Producer
2003	Soru Bowari	Producer, director, writer

== Theatre ==
In 2004, Chakradhar Deka founded Rajashree Theatre, a mobile theatre company in Assam. The theatre has staged 48 plays till date and performed over 10,000 shows in several regions of the state.

In 2005, the theatre adapted the Hollywood classic The Godfather into a play. The adaptation was scripted by Pabitra Kumar Deka.

In 2007, producer Deka collaborated with writer-actor Champak Sharma to recreate the iconic Bollywood film Sholay on stage.

== Literature ==
In 2001, Chakradhar Deka wrote a book titled Dhanxor Gorahot Axom (Assam on its way of destruction): An Analytical book on Assam's economy. Moromor Bowari (2004), Nuphula Phulor Samadhi (2005), Maa Aru Maammi (2006) and Sendur (2007) are the plays written by Deka for his theatre.

== Awards ==
List of awards won by Chakradhar Deka
Year	Category	For	Award	Result	Ref(s).
2003	Best Film	Soru Bowari	Royal Challenge 8th Moonlight Media Awards	Won	
2004	Best Theatre Group	Rajashree Theatre	9th Moonlight Media Awards	Won	
2006	Outstanding Contribution	Assamese Cultural Industry	11th Moonlight Media Awards	Won	
2006	Outstanding Contribution	Assamese Cultural Industry	Rodali Mobile Theatre Awards	Won	
2006	Best Director	Nuphula Phulor Samadhi	Y's Men International	Nominated	
2006	Best Theatre Group	Rajashree Theatre	Y's Men International	Won	
2007	Best Theatre Group	Rajashree Theatre	Shree Shree Hari Mandir Raas Committee	Won	

== Chakradhar Deka Memorial ==
=== Chakradhar Deka Memorial Football Championship ===
Deka was a footballer in early stages of his life. He also served as a referee in various local tournaments. A football tournament is organised in his memory and clubs from all over the country are being invited every year.

=== Chakradhar Deka T20 Cricket Tournament ===
A local cricket tournament is organized every year in Mukalmua in the memory of Late Chakradhar Deka.
