= Narayan Deka =

Indian politician

Member of Assam Legislative Assembly
- Incumbent
- Assumed office 4 May 2026
- Preceded by: Diganta Barman
- Constituency: Barkhetry
- In office 2016–2021
- Preceded by: Bhumidhar Barman
- Succeeded by: Diganta Barman
- Constituency: Barkhetry

Chairman, Guwahati Metropolitan Development Authority
- Incumbent
- Assumed office 2021

Personal details
- Born: Mukalmua
- Party: Bharatiya Janata Party
- Relations: Chakradhar Deka (brother)
- Education: Raghunath Choudhary Higher Secondary School
- Occupation: Chairman, GMDA
- Profession: Politician

Narayan Deka is a Bharatiya Janata Party politician from Assam. He was elected as a Member of Legislative Assembly from Barkhetry constituency in 2016. He defeated Diganta Barman (Indian National Congress), with a margin of approximately 9000 votes. He lost to Diganta in the 2021 elections. He was reelected in 2026.

Narayan Deka is the founder and chairman of International School Guwahati.

He is currently appointed the chairman of GMDA (Guwahati Metropolitan Development Authority).
