= Pulakesh Barua =

Indian politician

- পুলাকেশ বৰুৱা

Speaker of the Assam Legislative Assembly
- In office 9 January 1986 – 27 July 1991
- Deputy: Bhadreswar Buragohain; Balobhadra Tamuli
- Preceded by: Sheikh Chand Mohammad
- Succeeded by: Jiba Kanta Gogoi

Member, Assam Legislative Assembly
- In office 1996–2001
- Preceded by: Bhumidhar Barman
- Succeeded by: Bhumidhar Barman
- In office 1985–1991
- Preceded by: Sheikh Chand Mohammad
- Succeeded by: Bhumidhar Barman
- Constituency: Barkhetry

Personal details
- Born: 23 October 1948 (age 77)
- Party: Assam Jatiya Parishad (since 2020)
- Other political affiliations: Asom Gana Parishad; Natun Asom Gana Parishad; Trinamool Gana Parishad
- Parent: Ishwar Chandra Barua

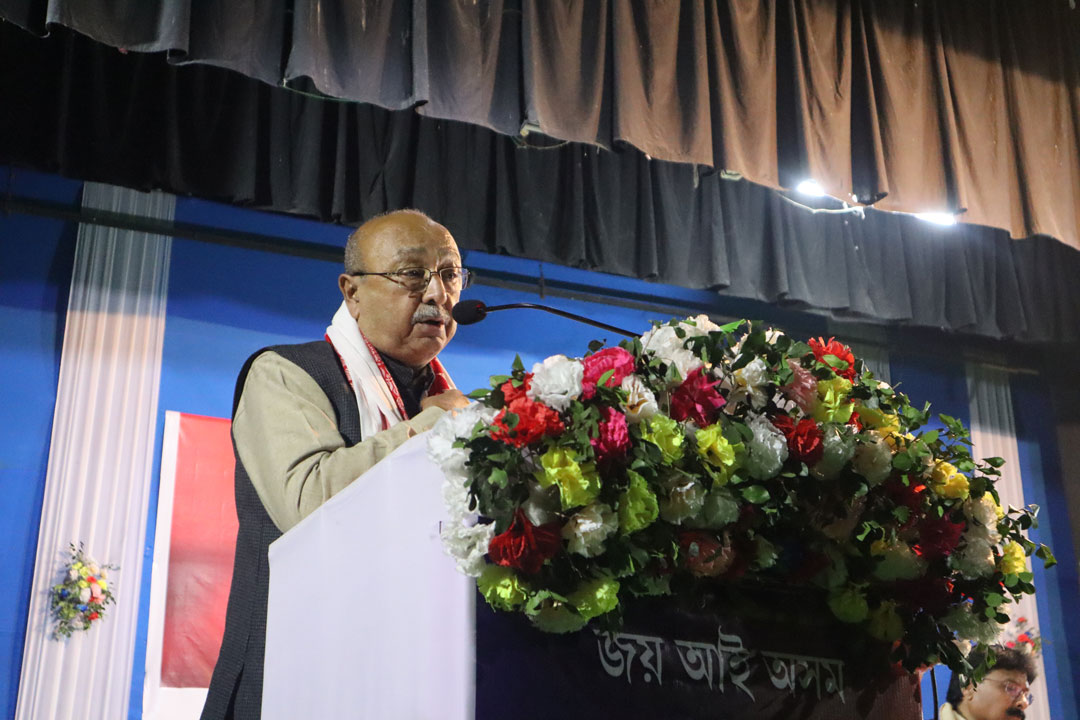
Barua addressing media and public in a meeting of Assam Jatiya Parishad (political party) in Sibsagar, Assam

Pulakesh Barua is an Indian politician from the state of Assam. He had formed the Natun Asom Gana Parishad (NAGP), a regional political party in 1991 along with Dinesh Goswami and Bhrigu Kumar Phukan but merged the party with the Asom Gana Parishad in 1994. He was the speaker of Assam Legislative Assembly from 9 January 1986 – 27 July 1991.

Having later joined AJP (Assam Jatiya Parishad), he was an active member of that party as on 19 November 2020.

== Background ==
Pulakesh Barua was born on 15 October 1948 in Nalbari to Lt. Prof. Ishwar Chandra Barua, founder of Nalbari college, a social worker and a litterateur and Lt. Ambika Barua.

Barua passed his Higher secondary school in 1966 from Gurdon Higher Secondary School, Nalbari. He was General Secretary of All Nalbari Students Union in 1966. He joined Cotton College in 1966, pass BSc with honours in 1969. He joined Guwahati University law college in 1970. He became the general secretary of Guwahati university Law College Students Union in 1972 and the same year became the president of AASU (All Assam Students Union). He completed LLB and joined Nalbari Bar Association in 1975.

Barua married Parul Deka in 1981 with whom he has one son and a daughter.

== Political career ==
He joined Purbanchaliya Loka Parishad (PLP), a regional political party of Assam along with Lt. Nibaran Borah, Atul Bora, Pabindra Deka, Dr. Krishna Gopal Bhattacharjee in the year 1977. During the 6 years long Assam Movement on foreigner’s issue, he actively participated under AAGSP (All Assam Gana Sangram Parishad) as a member from PLP.

After the Assam Accord of 15 August 1985, he joined Asom Gana Parishad a regional political party of Assam and became the speaker of Assam Legislative Assembly from 9 January 1986 – 27 July 1991. He also became the AGP MLA, Barkhetry constituency from 1996 – 2001. He is in active politics and has repeatedly highlighted issues pertaining to the development of his constituency and also for the betterment of Assam.

His major contribution as a politician is solution of chronic flood problem of Barbhag area in Nalbari district. He started an employment generation scheme, a dairy farm project in Barkhetry constituency in 1988 which has benefitted the local population greatly.

He joined AJP as an executive member on 19 November 2020.
