= Jainism in India =

India's sixth-largest religion

Indian Jains
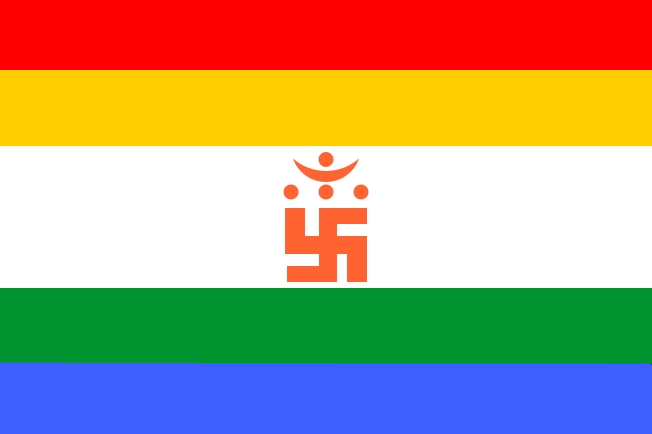
- Flag for Indian Jains

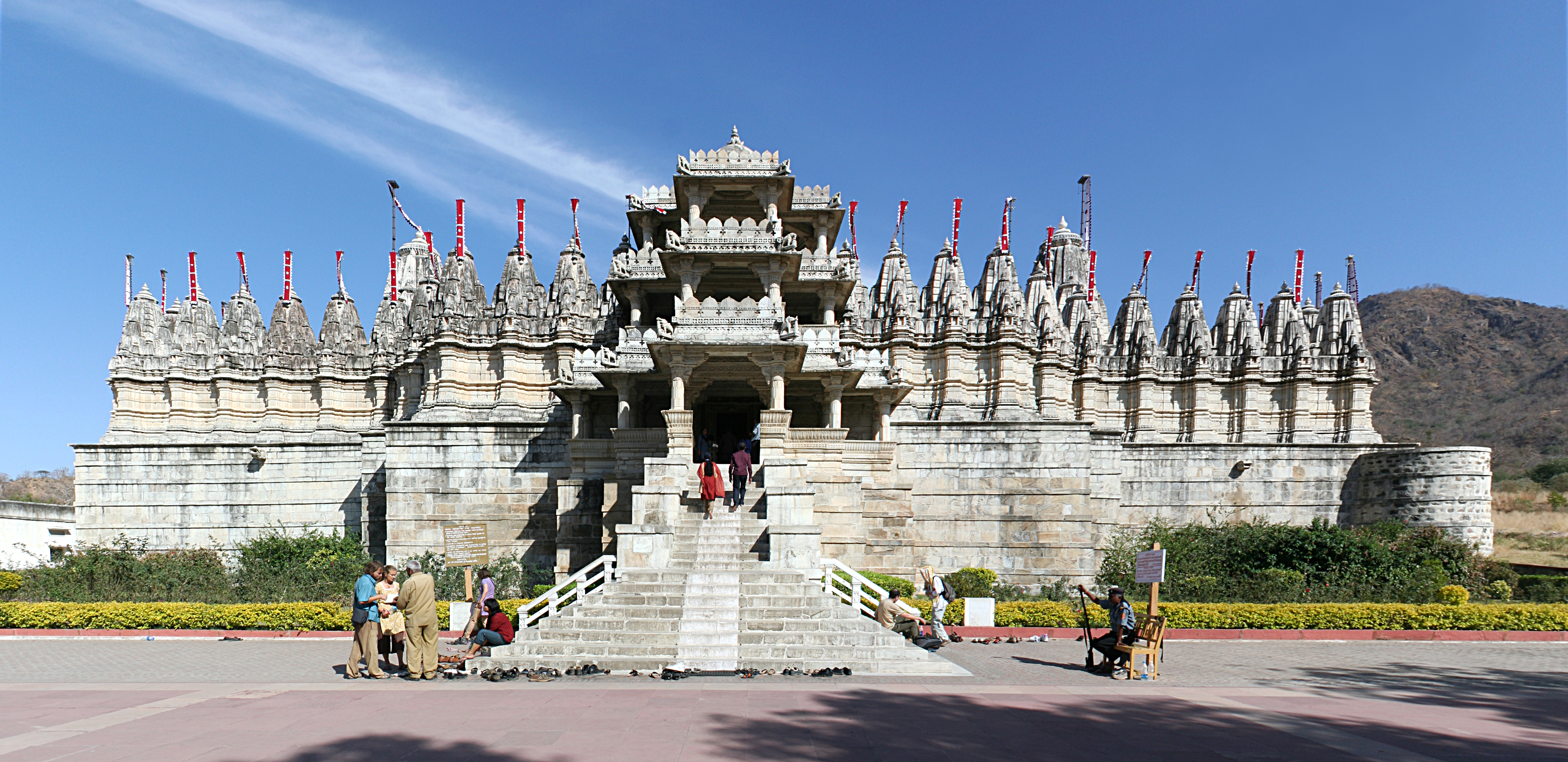
- Ranakpur Jain temple

Total population
- ▲4,451,753 (2011); ~ 0.36% (of the total population of India)

Regions with significant populations
- Maharashtra: 1,400,349
- Rajasthan: 622,023
- Gujarat: 579,654
- Madhya Pradesh: 567,028
- Karnataka: 440,280
- Uttar Pradesh: 213,267
- Delhi: 166,231

Religions
- Jainism

Languages
- Prakrit (sacred); Indian languages (according to the region)

Jainism is India's sixth-largest religion. As per the census of 2011, there were 4,451,753 Jains in the 1.35 billion population of India, the majority living in Maharashtra, Rajasthan, Gujarat, Madhya Pradesh, Karnataka, and so on. However, the influence of Jainism has been far greater on Indian and the South Asian population than these numbers suggest. Jains can be found in every state and every union territories of India, varying from large societies to smaller. The state of Jharkhand, with a population of 16,301 and counting Jains also contains the most holy pilgrimage centre of Sammed Shikhar. Indian Jains can also be found in many other countries throughout the world.

== History ==
Jain doctrine teaches that Jainism has always existed and will always exist. Like most ancient Indian religions, Jainism has its roots from the Indus Valley civilization, reflecting native spirituality prior to the Indo-Aryan migration into India. Other scholars suggested the Shramana traditions were separate and contemporaneous with Indo-Aryan religious practices of the historical Vedic religion. In August 2005, the Supreme Court of India ruled that Jainism, Sikhism (and Buddhism) are distinct religions but are inter-connected and inter-related to Hinduism, so these three are part of wider broader Hindu religion, based on the historic background on how the Constitution had come into existence after. However, in the 2006 verdict, the Supreme Court found that the "Jain Religion is indisputably not a part of the Hindu Religion".

== Status in India ==
On January 20, 2014, the Government of India awarded the minority status to the Jain community in India, as per Section 2(c) of the National Commission for Minorities (NCM) Act (NCM), 1992. This made the Jain community, which makes for 9.5 million or 0.72 percent of the population as per 2011 census, the sixth community to be designated this status as a "national minority", after Muslims, Christians, Sikhs, Buddhists, and Parsis. Though Jains already had minority status in 11 states of India including Uttar Pradesh, Madhya Pradesh, Chhattisgarh and Rajasthan, in 2005 a petition was filed with Supreme Court of India, by community representatives, which was also backed by the National Minorities Commission. In its judgement the court left the decision to the Central government.

== Jainism by state ==
Jainism as a religion exists throughout India. Jainism also varies from state to state, but the core values are the same.

Percentage of Jain population by state and union territory (2011 Census)
State or union territory	Jain population	Total population	Percentage Jain (%)
Maharashtra	1,400,349	112,374,333	1.25
Rajasthan	1,023,587	68,548,437	0.91
Gujarat	579,654	60,439,692	0.96
Madhya Pradesh	567,028	72,626,809	0.78
Karnataka	440,280	61,095,297	0.72
Delhi	166,231	16,787,941	0.99
Uttar Pradesh	213,267	199,812,341	0.11
Tamil Nadu	89,265	72,147,030	0.12
Chhattisgarh	61,510	25,545,198	0.24
West Bengal	60,141	91,276,115	0.07
Andhra Pradesh	53,849	49,577,103	0.11
Haryana	52,613	25,351,462	0.21
Punjab	45,040	27,743,338	0.16
Assam	25,949	31,205,576	0.08
Bihar	18,914	104,099,452	0.02
Jharkhand	14,974	32,988,134	0.05

Source: Data compiled from the Census of India 2011.

== Census of India, 2011 ==
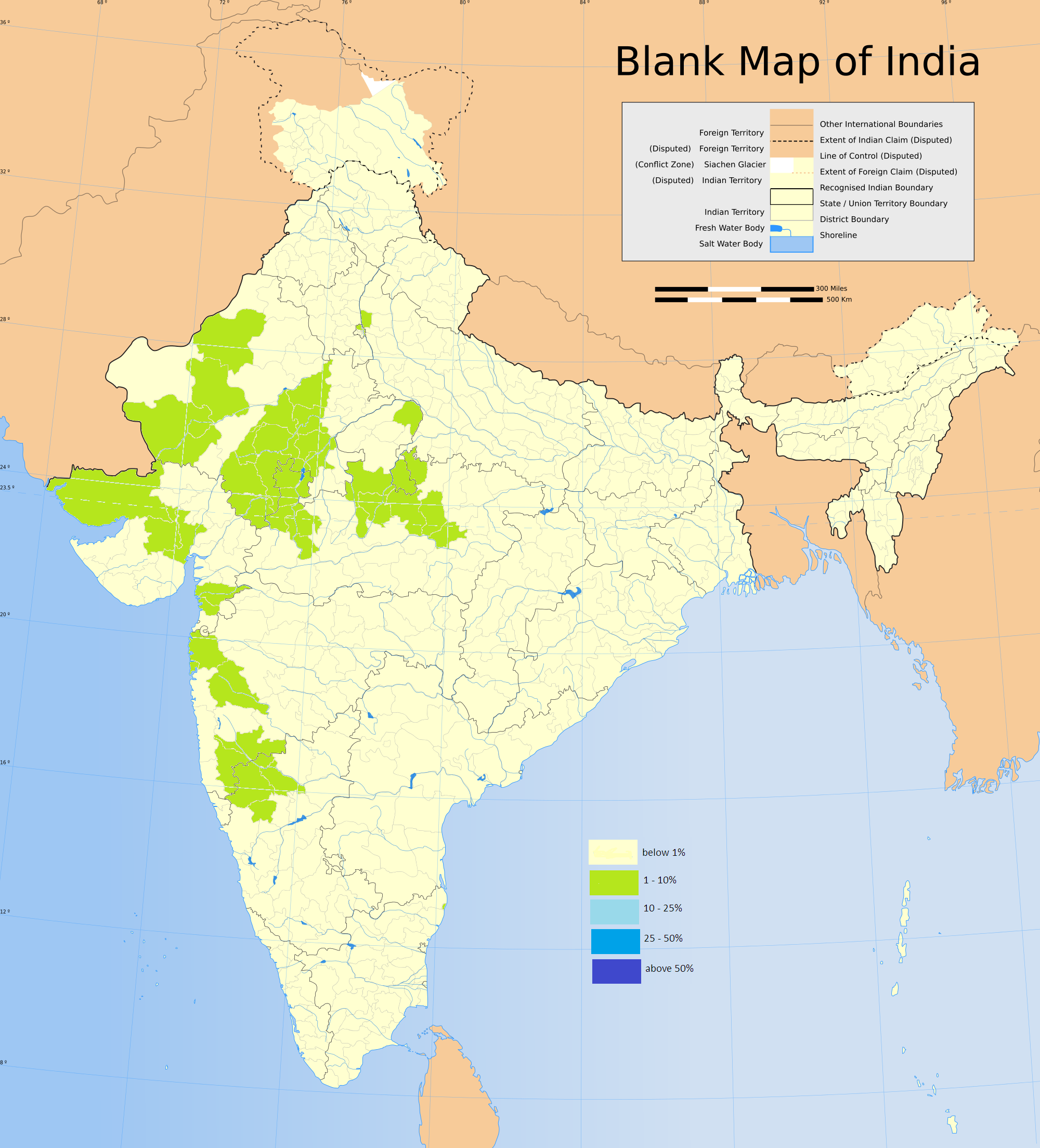
District wise Jain population percentage India census 2011

Jain population in India by State (2011)
State	Jains
Maharashtra	1,400,349
Rajasthan	622,023
Gujarat	579,654
Madhya Pradesh	567,028
Karnataka	440,280
Uttar Pradesh	213,267
Delhi	166,231
Tamil Nadu	89,265
Chhattisgarh	61,510
West Bengal	60,141
Andhra Pradesh	53,849
Haryana	52,613
Punjab	45,040
Assam	25,949
Bihar	18,914
Jharkhand	14,974
Other states	40,666

Indian districts having more than 1% Jains in 2011 Census
District	State	Jain Population (approximate)	Total population	Jain Percentage (%)
Mumbai City district	Maharashtra	166,000	3,085,411	5.38%
Kolhapur district	Maharashtra	154,882	3,876,001	4.00%
Mumbai Suburban district	Maharashtra	343,639	9,356,962	3.67%
Sangli district	Maharashtra	87,453	2,822,143	3.10%
Thane district	Maharashtra	172,052	11,060,148	1.56%
Pune district	Maharashtra	127,786	9,429,408	1.36%
Udaipur district	Rajasthan	78,647	3,068,420	2.56%
Ajmer district	Rajasthan	45,614	2,583,052	1.77%
Chittorgarh district	Rajasthan	25,843	1,544,338	1.67%
Tonk district	Rajasthan	22,458	1,421,326	1.58%
Bhilwara district	Rajasthan	35,149	2,408,523	1.46%
Kota district	Rajasthan	25,742	1,951,014	1.32%
Barmer district	Rajasthan	34,010	2,603,751	1.31%
Bikaner district	Rajasthan	30,850	2,363,937	1.31%
Rajsamand district	Rajasthan	14,966	1,156,597	1.29%
Banswara district	Rajasthan	22,613	1,797,485	1.26%
Jaipur district	Rajasthan	81,079	6,626,178	1.22%
Bundi district	Rajasthan	13,455	1,110,906	1.21%
Dungarpur district	Rajasthan	16,141	1,388,552	1.16%
Ahmedabad district	Gujarat	209,287	7,214,225	2.90%
Surat district	Gujarat	112,835	6,081,322	1.86%
Surendranagar district	Gujarat	22,992	1,585,268	1.31%
Kutch district	Gujarat	25,312	2,092,371	1.21%
Navsari district	Gujarat	13,386	1,329,672	1.01%
Sagar district	Madhya Pradesh	62,992	2,378,458	2.65%
Indore district	Madhya Pradesh	71,667	3,276,697	2.19%
Ratlam district	Madhya Pradesh	29,353	1,455,069	2.02%
Damoh district	Madhya Pradesh	25,005	1,264,219	1.98%
Ashoknagar district	Madhya Pradesh	15,094	845,071	1.79%
Neemuch district	Madhya Pradesh	14,165	826,067	1.71%
Mandsaur district	Madhya Pradesh	19,029	1,340,411	1.42%
Jabalpur district	Madhya Pradesh	33,728	2,463,289	1.37%
Vidisha district	Madhya Pradesh	18,490	1,458,875	1.27%
Ujjain district	Madhya Pradesh	24,622	1,986,864	1.24%
Bhind district	Madhya Pradesh	19,950	1,703,005	1.17%
Bhopal district	Madhya Pradesh	25,950	2,371,061	1.09%
Guna district	Madhya Pradesh	13,474	1,241,519	1.09%
Tikamgarh district	Madhya Pradesh	15,569	1,445,166	1.08%
Belagavi district	Karnataka	178,310	4,779,661	3.73%
Dharwad district	Karnataka	29,037	1,847,023	1.57%
Bagalkot district	Karnataka	25,198	1,889,752	1.33%
Lalitpur district	Uttar Pradesh	20,390	1,221,592	1.67%
Bagpat district	Uttar Pradesh	16,139	1,303,048	1.24%
East Delhi	Delhi	46,927	1,709,346	2.75%
North Delhi	Delhi	13,049	887,978	1.47%
North West Delhi	Delhi	43,460	3,656,539	1.19%
North East Delhi	Delhi	24,673	2,241,624	1.10%
Central Delhi	Delhi	5,886	582,320	1.01%
Chennai district	Tamil Nadu	51,708	4,646,732	1.11%

Literacy in India by religion
Religion	Literacy Rate
Jain	94.9
Christian	84.5
Buddhist	81.3
Sikh	75.4
Hindu	73.3
Muslim	68.5

== See also ==
- List of Jain temples
