= Sri Surya Pahar =

Archaeological site in Assam, India

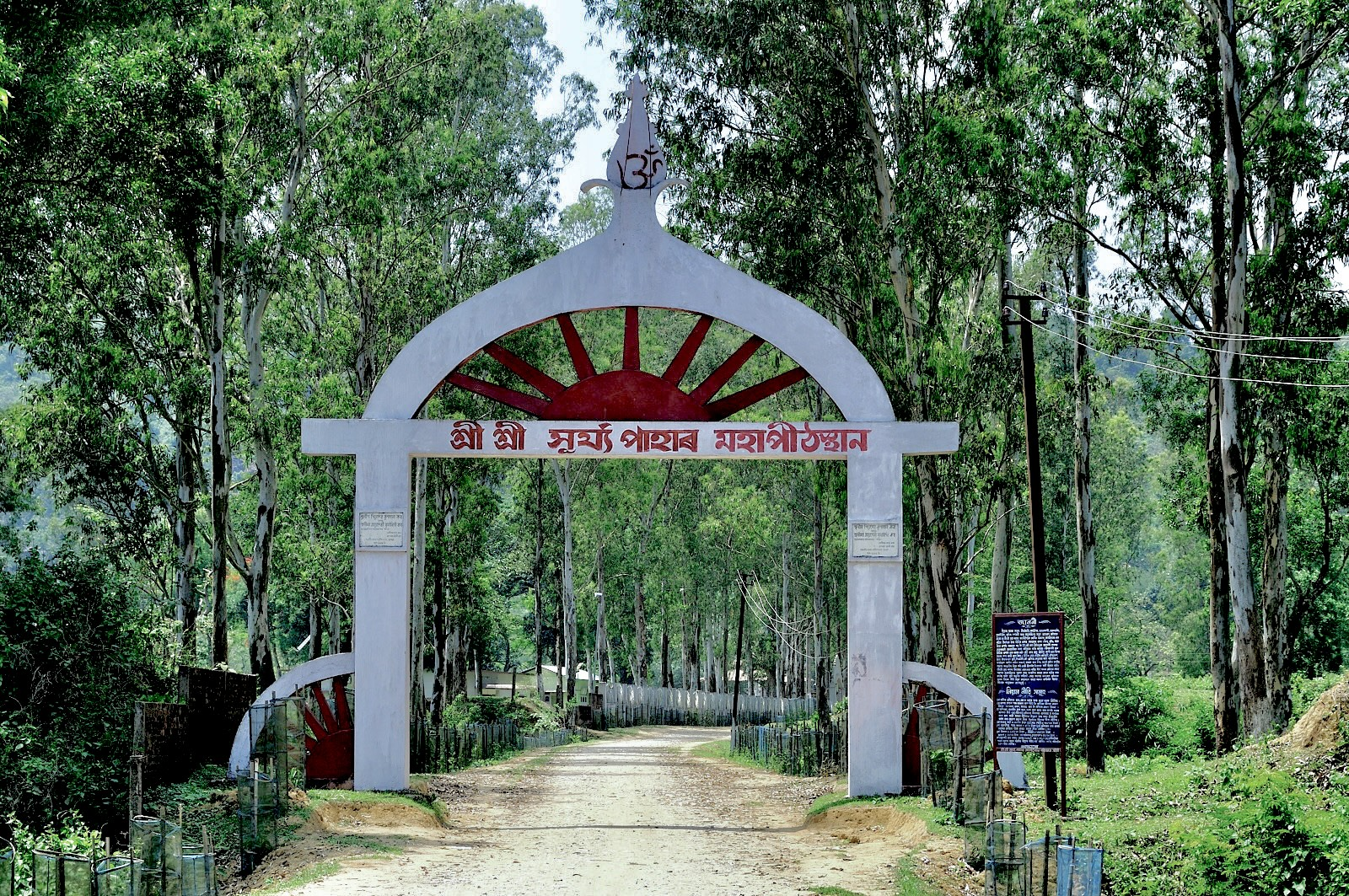
- Gateway of Surya Pahar

- Location within Assam Location within India
- 26°6′31″N 90°42′27″E
- Type: Sanctuary
- Location: Goalpara, Assam, India

History
- Built: 1st century – 12th century AD

Site notes
- Area: 1,400 acres (570 ha) (Site); 477.04 square metres (5,134.8 sq ft) (Brick temple); 1,217,597 square metres (13,106,110 sq ft) (Temple complex)
- Excavation dates: 1992–2001
- Archaeologists: K. K. Muhammed

Sri Surya Pahar, located about 13 kilometres (8.1 mi) southeast of Goalpara and about 132 kilometres (82 mi) northwest of Guwahati, is a significant but relatively unknown archaeological site in Assam, India. Goalpara is the nearest city from the site. The site is a hilly terrain where several rock-cut Shiva lingas, votive stupas and deities of the Hindu, Buddhist and Jain pantheon are scattered in an area of about one km. The site is centered on seven hills (Pahar) of Sri Surya which are profusely filled up with Shiva Lingas. People have found 99,999 Shiva Lingas were engraved here by Vyasa in order to build up a second Kashi (where there were 1,00,000 Shiva Lingas) and once it was one of the holiest pilgrimage sites in the region. There is no historical evidence exactly how many Lingams once dotted in these hills, but still there are hundreds of them, from tiny to large in size, scattered everywhere at the foot of the hill and covering the extensive area after centuries of neglect and pilferage. The exact number of Lingas (and also other deities and relics) in the hill is yet to be counted scientifically.

A few years ago, some archaeologists unearthed a few Shiva Lingas and a few houses at Sri Surya — findings which confirmed the long-held belief that a thriving civilization held sway around Sri Surya Pahar some centuries ago. The intricate and scientific designs of the houses with artfully designed bricks led some archaeologists to believe unearthing the history of Sri Surya Pahar would change the understanding of the history of ancient Assam and India. Some scholars even referred to the accounts of famous Chinese traveler Huen Tsang to claim it was Sri Surya Pahar and not Guwahati that was the ancient land of Pragjyotishpur or Pragjyotisha Kingdom, the capital of the Kingdom of Kumar Bhaskara Varman (600-650). The findings of the nearby archaeological site of Paglatek are cited to strengthen this claim. Since Sri Surya Pahar is very close to the bank of the Brahmaputra river, it might have been an important trade centre or seat of administration in the past.

Another important significance of Sri Surya Pahar is that it was once a confluence of three religions as evident from the innumerable sculptures and other relics belonging to Hinduism, Buddhism and Jainism. It is spread over 1,400 acres (570 ha).

== Remains of Hinduism ==
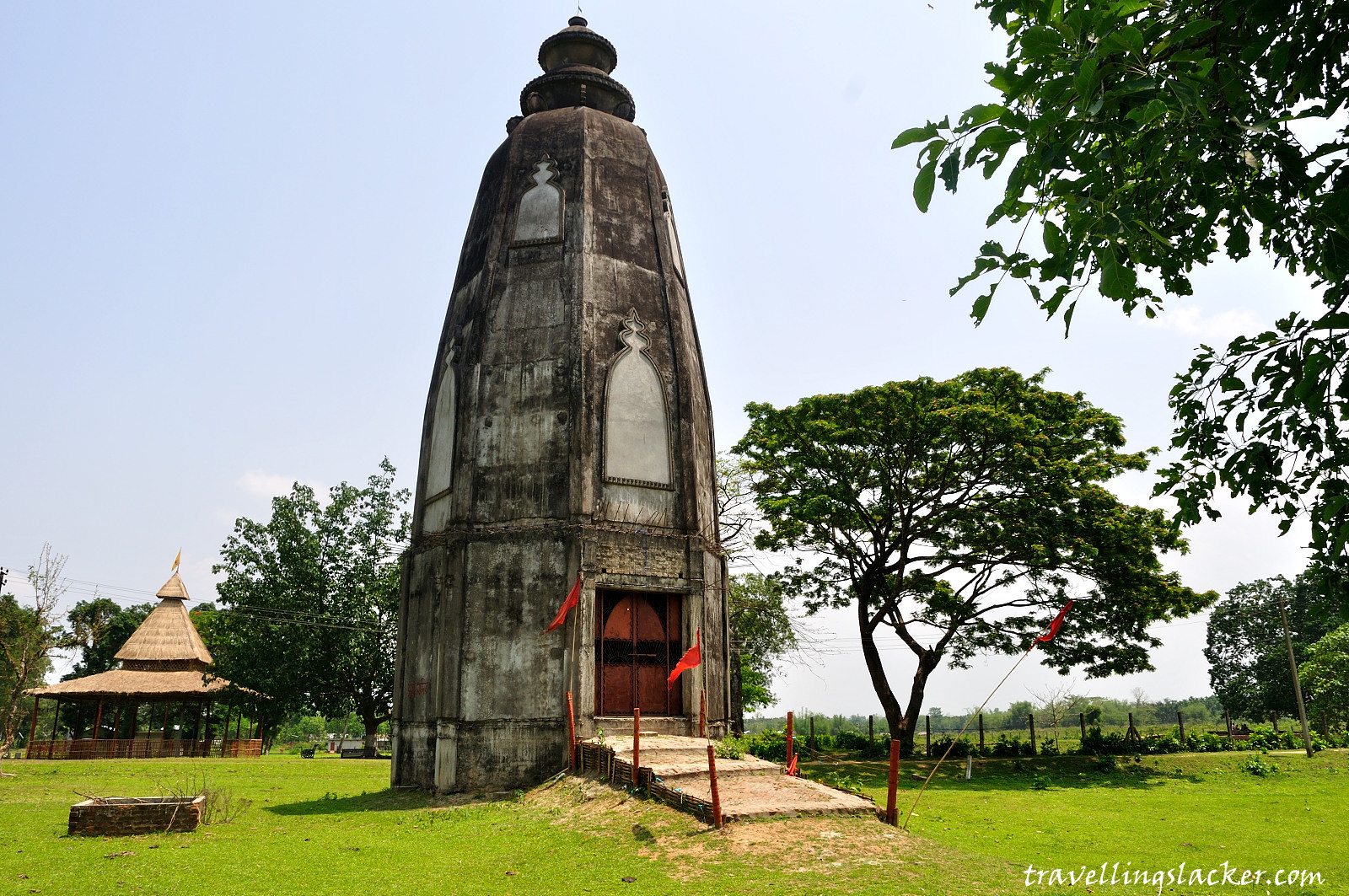
Shiv temple at Surya Pahar

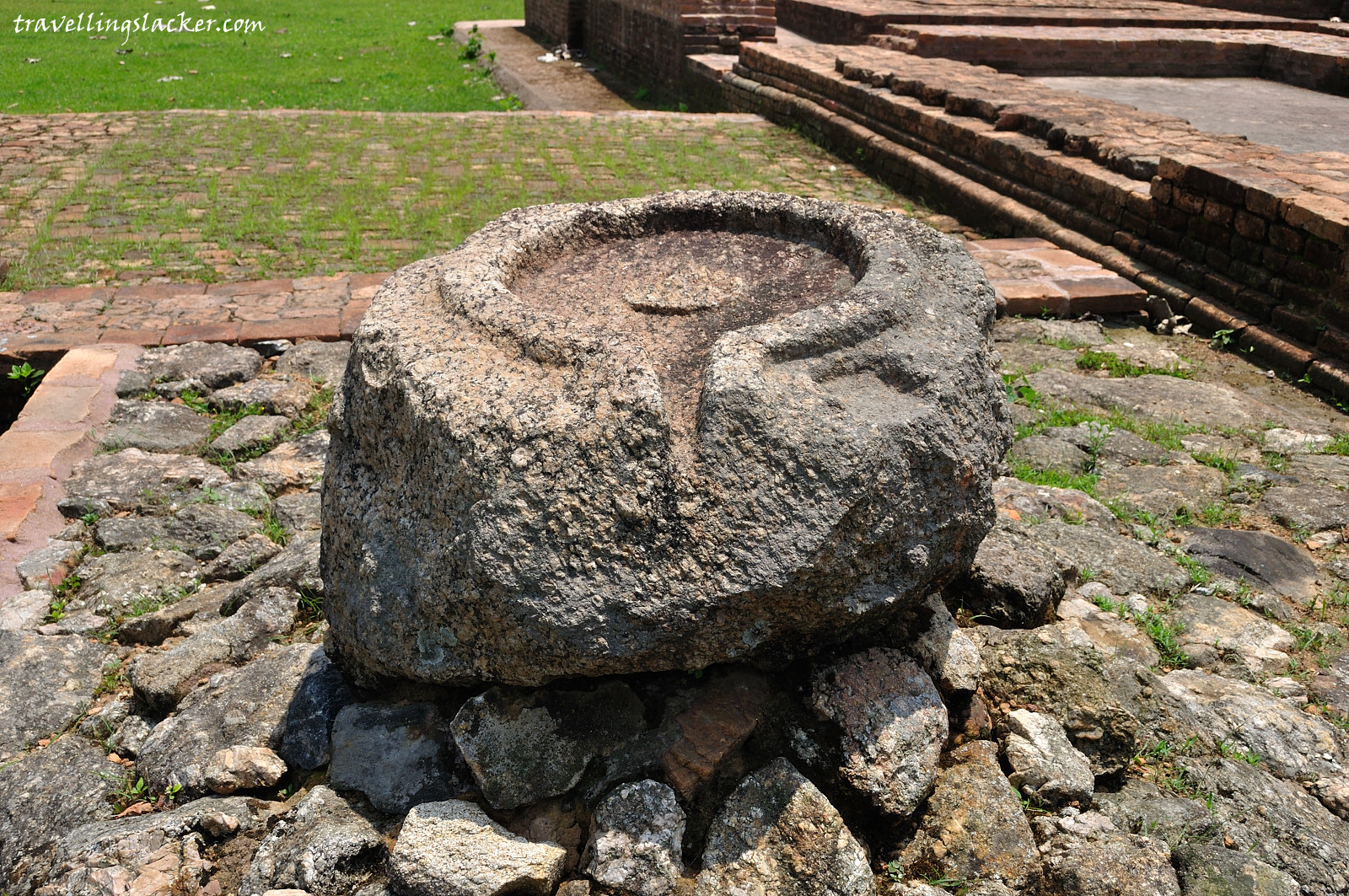
Ruins at Surya Pahar

The name 'Sri Surya Pahar' implies the site was perhaps associated with a form of sun (Surya) worship. Literary accounts corroborate that among other Hindu deities worshipped in ancient Assam, 'Surya' (or the Sun God) occupied a prominent place in its cultural history. References are found in the Kalika-Purana (c. 10th century) about two seats of sun worship in ancient Assam. One of the centres has been identified as Sri Surya Pahar which bears the iconographic significance of the form as well.

Some archaeologists believe a carved stone slab, now housed in the Sri Surya Temple and worshipped as 'Surya', may be the detached part that formed the ceiling of the temple of Surya. The central figure in the circular carvings of the slab has been identified as Prajapati, whose sculpture is carved inside an inner circle while the surrounding outer circle is in the form of twelve lotus petals. Each lotus petal has the seated figure of an Aditya. These twelve Adityas are described as twelve solar divinities namely Dhatri, Mitra, Aryaman, Rudra, Varuna, Surya, Bhaga, Vivasvan, Pushan, Savitr, Tvastr and Vishnu.

Besides the numerous stone carvings of Shiva Lingas and the 'Prajapati' slab, there are many rock carvings of Hindu deities which can be seen at the foothills of Sri Surya Pahar and its adjacent areas. Notable among them are the sculptural panels of Shiva and Vishnu. These panels are in the style of the Eastern School of Art, developed during the reigns of Dharmapala and Devapala of the Pala Empire in the early 9th century. The twelve-armed Vishwarupa Vishnu with a seven-hooded canopy over its head is the central deity. It is worshipped as Dasabhuja Durga. Embellished with necklaces, kundalas, armlets, garlands, etc., the deity stands upright on a lotus.

There are differences among scholars about the identification of the twelve-armed 'Vishnu' sculpture. According to historians Birinchi Kumar Baruah and Srinivas Murthi, the sculpture is of Ma (mother) Manasha, while the Archaeological Survey of India has identified it as a male deity which was tempered with thick plaster into a female one subsequently. There is a series of rock carvings on either side of this prominent figure. The notable remains are the Ganesha, Hari Hara (or Harihara), Vishnupadas, etc. Most of these carved figures are assigned to circa 9th century AD. Similar to the Surya Chakra (sun wheel), there also exists a Chandra Chakra (moon wheel), but natural vagaries have eroded it badly.

== Jain Heritage ==
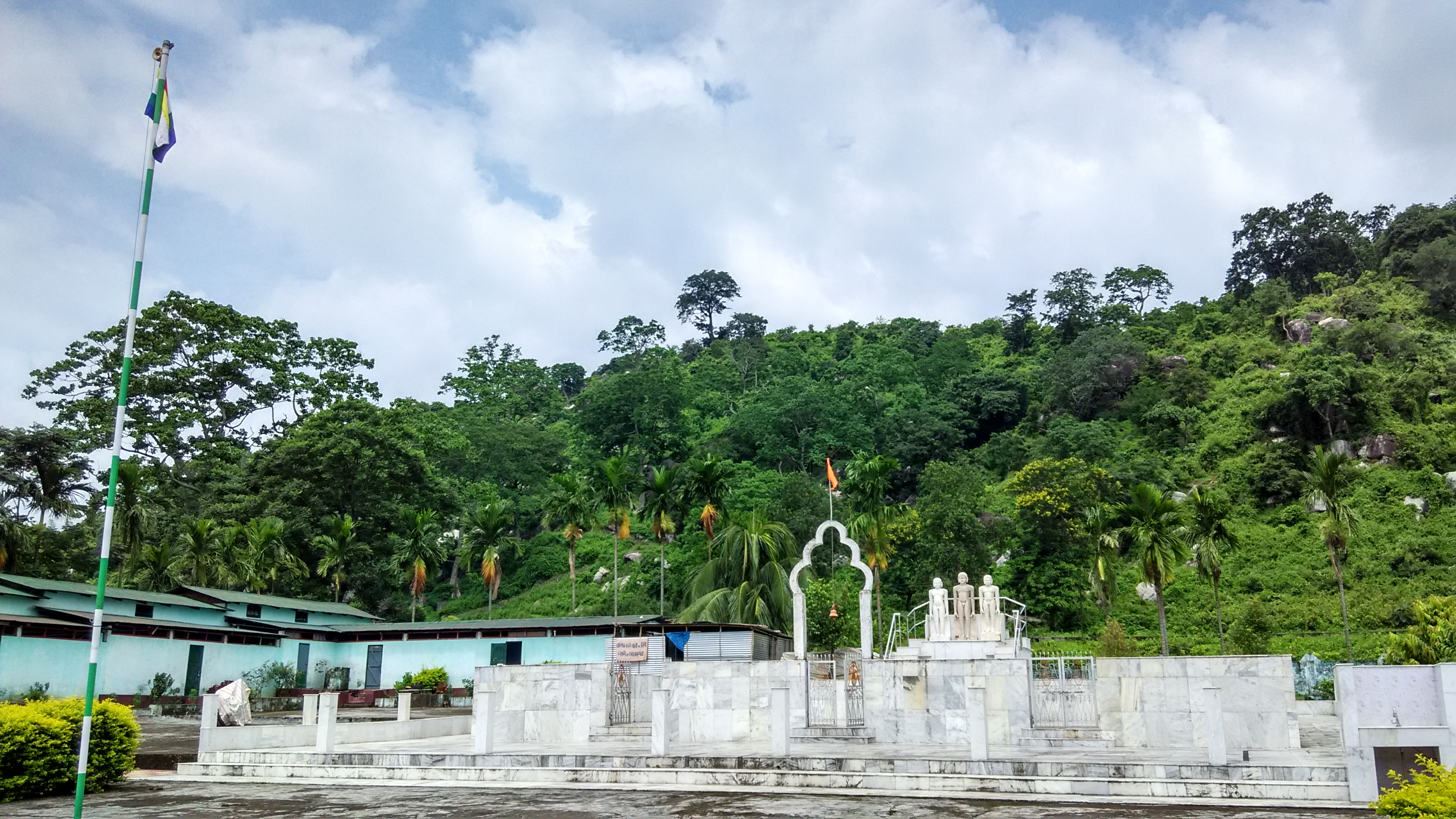
Jain temple

Jainism could not get any footing in the North-East region of India throughout its long history. Except for the solitary example existing inside the natural caves at Sri Surya Pahar, hardly any other Jain remains have been found so far in the region. It was probably the followers of Rishabanath whose foot prints are also at Sri Surya Pahar. The iconography of Jain images found here is little different near their hands, but are found naked as per traditional Jain iconography.

On the southern slope of Sri Surya Pahar, there is a natural cavern made of piled stones. Within the natural caves, there are Jain carvings. Remains of these Jain affiliations in the form of inscription and rock carvings are assigned to the 9th century AD. There are two figures carved in a big granite boulder which are in low relief. The figures are shown in a standing posture with their hands hanging down to the knees and their cognisance are shown below the figures in low relief. Another figure carved at the top of the hill is identified as Adinath. The figure is carved in a sitting posture in the rocky outcrop and two bulls are marked at the base, the mark of cognisance of the first Tirthankara. These figures are also believed to be of the 9th century AD. Sculptures with a standing Rishabhanatha were found in both the first and second rock shelters, while a similar sculpture of Neminatha was found in the first rock shelter.

== Buddhist Remains ==
On a vast area right from the extreme northwestern slope of the Sri Surya Pahar hill up to one kilometer further south, there are found as many as 25 votive stupas of different shapes and sizes cut out of granite boulders. These stupas are significant for they show two points: first, there was Buddhist influence in ancient Kamarupa, in contrast with the commonly held belief that Buddhism was not prevalent in the cultural history of ancient Kamarupa; and secondly, Buddhist influence in ancient Kamarupa was much earlier than in the rest of the country.

On the extreme north east corner on a higher altitude, a huge fallen granite boulder was selected for carving three giant stupas, carved in one row, facing the east. The structural feature of the stupas consist of Vedi, Medhi Anda and Harmika which are distinct. The stupas are archaic in shape with three gradually receding rings round the base. The topmost ring that supports the dome is almost semicircular in shape with flattened top. On the top of the dome there are the remnants of a square 'harmika' with groove in the centre to hold the shaft of 'chhatra' or 'chhatravali' (parasol). The crowning element is, however, missing. The three monolithic stupas are representative of either Dharma, Sangha and the Buddha, or they could be termed as an Uddeshika stupa carved in the memory of the Buddha.

According to the Archaeological Survey of India, the archaic shape of the carvings shows the stupas at Sri Surya Pahar were hewn during the Hinayana phase of Buddhism of early Christian era. Further development of the faith in the later phases is not yet seen at the site. Later phases of Mahayana and Vajrayana esotericism were seen in the neighbouring territories of Bihar and Bengal. The 25 rock-cut stupas were probably built in the 1st century BC/AD, during the Hinayana phase. Terracotta plaques with images of the Buddha in Padmasana and Avalokiteśvara date to the 8th century, as does a chaitya motif, all found at or near the site.

An interesting feature of the stupa complex is that in the 9th-10th century A.D., when the area was pre-occupied by the followers of Hindu pantheons, attempts were made to carve Siva Lingas along with Yonipith and channel spout on fallen boulders. Altogether half a dozen Siva Lingas exist there. One elliptical stupa was also carved on a smaller boulder lying within two huge boulders is an interesting piece of Art, as this elliptical shape is very rare in Eastern India. One such stupa found at Langudi in Jaipur district of Orissa dates to the 1st century A.D.

The stupas and also terracotta plaques with a figure of the Buddha found in regular excavations indicate Buddhism flourished in the lower Brahmaputra valley, especially in and around Surya Pahar during the early part of the Christian Era and continued up to the 10th Century A.D. In the 9th century A.D., the Pala Dynasty (who were followers of Mahayana and Vajrayana Buddhism) stretched to a large part of India including Assam resulting in the spread of Buddhism throughout the Brahmaputra Valley (undivided Assam). Buddhist remains found in some nearby areas like Pancharatna, Barbhita village and Bhaitbari (now in Meghalaya) in the southern banks of the lower Brahmaputra valley also strengthen the fact.

== Excavations ==
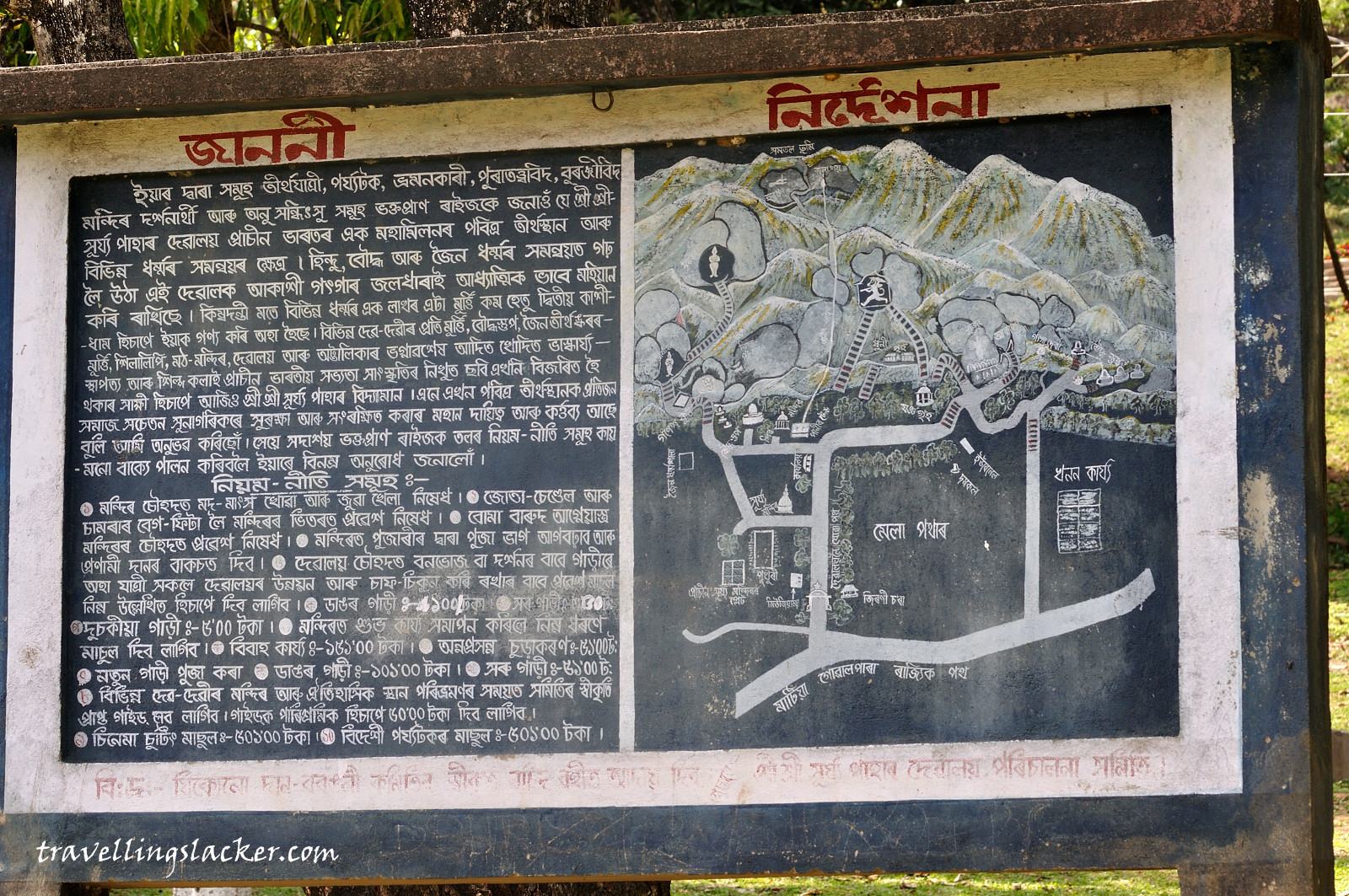
Notice Board at Surya Pahar

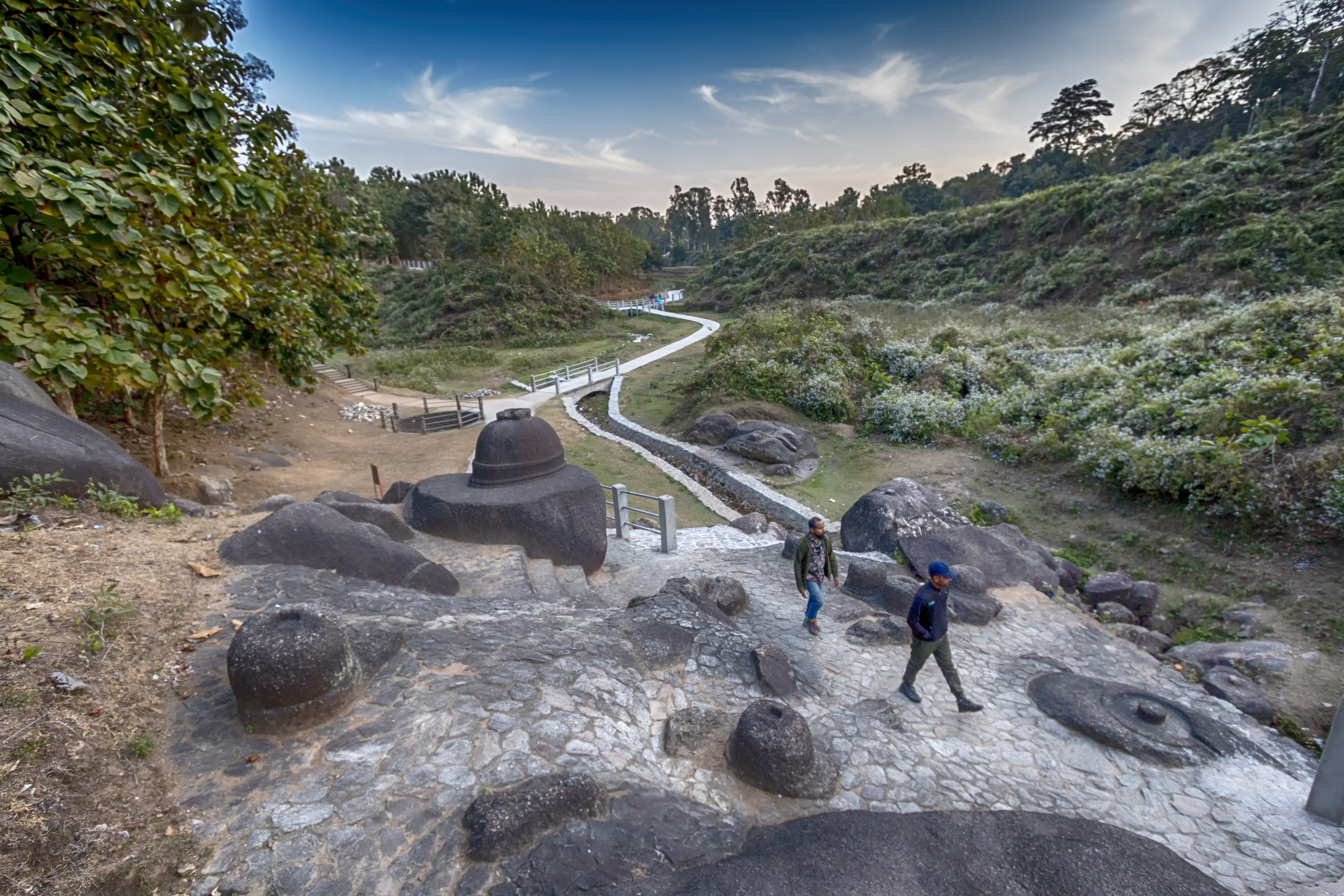
Ruins of Sri Surya Pahar

The Archaeological Survey of India (ASI) carried out excavations in Sri Surya Pahar from 1992 to 2001. Initial works were carried out for brief periods annually which, however, exposed startling relics including heads of deities with Karanda Mukuta, Kirtimukha, vestiges of stupa, terracotta mortar-pestle and vessels used in rites, designed tiles, Apsaras, Purnaghat, etc.

Excavations carried out in 1996 and 1997 discovered a Buddhist stupa along with a monastery (vihara) which were estimated to belong to the 8th-9th century AD (contemporary to the Paharpur stupa now in the neighbouring country of Bangladesh).

Excavations carried out in later years also yielded two temple complexes. The first excavation carried out from 1999 to 2000 by G. C. Chauley and K. K. Muhammed found a brick temple, while the second excavation carried out by Syed Jamal Hasan from 2000 to 2001 found a panchayatana temple complex. The brick temple with a sanctum sanctorum (garbhagriha) and porch (mandapa) built during the Later Gupta dynasty or the early mediaeval period. The brick temple is enclosed by a rectangular wall with dimensions of 26.80 metres (87.9 ft) by 17.80 metres (58.4 ft). The excavators also found a number of antiquities at the site most of which were terracotta tiles and plaques. Remarkable discoveries from the temple complex near the ancient tank include sculptures of the Hindu deities Ganesha and Mahishasuramardini.

The panchayatana temple complex has a central temple and four smaller shrines all inside a quadrangular brick wall, with dimensions of 23.45 metres (76.9 ft) by 41.80 metres (137.1 ft) by 30.90 metres (101.4 ft) by 49.20 metres (161.4 ft). The images of the 12 Adityas and other Hindu deities were found in this complex. The Vishnu image of the central temple is on display at the Assam State Museum in Guwahati. This temple complex was probably built in the 9th to 12th century AD period, as its shikhara (spire) was built in the Nagara style.

In the southern foothills of Sri Surya Pahar, excavators found a stone-paved water kund with revetment walls. This type of ancient kund which can control the natural flow of water is found at many archaeological sites spread over India. This kund found at Sri Surya Pahar was probably used to take bath and perform other daily ablutions by devotees and monks before going to worship the Jain deities carved in the natural cavern.

The ASI established a museum at the site to exhibit most of the antiquities unearthed from the excavation. Some of these 96 collections displayed at the site museum include stone sculptures of Gajasimha, Vidyadhara, Salabhanjika, decorated lion head, moulded fish, plaques of the human figure, mythical animals, amalaka fragment, decorated tiles of floral and geometric designs, etc.

== Sources ==
- "Archaeological Museum Shri Surya Pahar At A Glance" (PDF). Archaeological Survey of India. 2015.
- Baruah, B. K. (1988). Temples & Legends of Assam. Bharatiya Vidya Bhavan – via archive.org.
- Choudhury, Subhajit; Chakraborty, Joydeep (2021). "Goalpariya Culture from Myth to Modernity: An Investigation from Emic Perspective". In Dey, Anup Kumar; Bhattacharjee, Somenath; Choudhury, Subhajit (eds.). Indigenous Ethnographies of Northeast India: From An Emic Perspective. Concept Publishing Company. pp. 269–299. ISBN 9789388937719.
