= List of speakers of the Assam Legislative Assembly =

Speakers and deputy speakers of the assan Legislative Assembly

Speaker of the Assam Legislative Assembly
- Seal of Assam

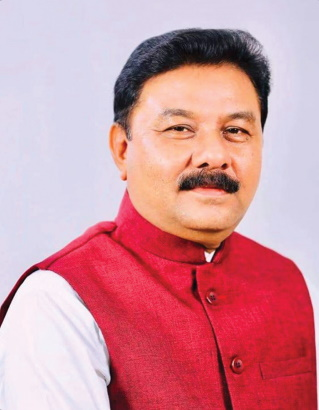
- Incumbent; Ranjeet Kumar Dass since 21 May 2026
- Assam Legislative Assembly
- Style: The Hon’ble (formal); Mr. Speaker (informal)
- Member of: Assam Legislative Assembly
- Reports to: Government of Assam
- Appointer: Members of the Legislative Assembly
- Term length: During the life of the Tripura Legislative Assembly (five years maximum)
- Deputy: List of deputy speakers of the Assam Legislative Assembly

The following is a list of the Speakers of the Assam Legislative Assembly, and their deputies.

== Speakers of the Assembly ==
=== Assam Province ===
#	Name	Portrait	Took office	Left office	Party
1	Babu Basanta Kumar Das		7 April 1937	11 March 1946	Indian National Congress
2	Debeswar Sarmah		12 March 1946	10 October 1947	Indian National Congress
3	Laksheswar Borooah		5 November 1947	3 March 1952	Indian National Congress

=== Assam State ===
#	Name	Portrait	Took office	Left office	Political Party
1	Kuladhar Chaliha		5 March 1952	7 June 1957	Indian National Congress
2	Devakanta Barua		8 June 1957	15 September 1959	Indian National Congress
3	Mahendra Mohan Choudhury		9 December 1959	19 March 1967	Indian National Congress
4	Hareswar Goswami		20 March 1967	10 May 1968	Indian National Congress
5	Mahi Kanta Das		27 August 1968	21 March 1972	Indian National Congress
6	Ramesh Chandra Barooah		22 March 1972	20 March 1978	Indian National Congress
7	Jogendra Nath Hazarika		21 March 1978	4 September 1979	Janata Party
8	Sheikh Chand Mohammad		7 November 1979	7 January 1986	Indian National Congress
9	Pulakesh Barua		9 January 1986	27 July 1991	Asom Gana Parishad
10	Jiba Kanta Gogoi		29 July 1991	9 December 1992	Indian National Congress
11	Debesh Chandra Chakravorty		21 December 1992	11 June 1996	Indian National Congress
12	Ganesh Kutum		12 June 1996	24 May 2001	Asom Gana Parishad
13	Prithibi Majhi		30 May 2001	19 May 2006	Indian National Congress
14	Tanka Bahadur Rai		29 May 2006	19 May 2011	Indian National Congress
15	Pranab Kumar Gogoi		6 June 2011	19 May 2016	Indian National Congress
16	Ranjeet Kumar Dass		1 June 2016	30 January 2017	Bharatiya Janata Party
17	Hitendra Nath Goswami		30 January 2017	20 May 2021	Bharatiya Janata Party
18	Biswajit Daimary		21 May 2021	21 May 2026	Bharatiya Janata Party
(16)	Ranjeet Kumar Dass		21 May 2026	Present	Bharatiya Janata Party

== Deputy speakers of the Assembly ==
The following is a list of the deputy speakers of the assembly.

#	Name	Took office	Left office	Party
1	Moulvi Muhammad Amiruddin	7 April 1937	1946	
2	Bonily Khongmen	14 March 1946		
3	R.N. Baruah	6 March 1952	1 April 1957	
4	R.N. Baruah	10 June 1957	28 February 1962	
5	D. Hazarika	31 March 1962	28 February 1967	
6	M. K. Das	31 March 1967	26 August 1968	
7	A. Rahman	20 September 1968	9 November 1970	
8	J. Saikin	13 November 1970	9 June 1971	
9	R. N. Sen	24 May 1971	14 March 1972	
10	Golok Rajbanshi	6 April 1972	3 March 1978	
11	Sheikh Chand Mohammad	30 March 1978	6 November 1979	
12	G. Ahmed	13 November 1979	19 March 1982	
13	N. C. Kath Hazarika	25 March 1983	18 August 1985	
14	Bhadreswar Buragohain	1 April 1986	10 April 1990	
15	Balobhadra Tamuli	22 October 1990	8 January 1991	
16	Debesh Chakraborty	1 August 1991	20 December 1992	
17	Prithibi Mahji	23 March 1993	11 May 1996	
18	Nurul Hussain	13 June 1996	18 August 1998	
19	Renupoma Rajkhowa	14 May 1991	17 May 2001	Asom Gana Parishad
20	Tanka Bahadur Rai	3 April 2002	14 May 2006	Indian National Congress
21	Pranati Phukan	31 May 2006	16 May 2011	Indian National Congress
22	Bhimananda Tanti	6 June 2011	19 May 2016	Indian National Congress
23	Dilip Kumar Paul	3 June 2016	8 May 2018	Bharatiya Janata Party
24	Kripanath Mallah	26 September 2018	4 June 2019	Bharatiya Janata Party
25	Aminul Haque Laskar	31 July 2019	2 May 2021	Bharatiya Janata Party
26	Numal Momin	21 May 2021	21 May 2026	Bharatiya Janata Party
27	Habbey Teron	18 June 2026	Present	Bharatiya Janata Party

== Pro tem Speaker ==
=== List of Pro tem Speakers ===
- Pranab Gogoi 2011
- Phani Bhusan Choudhury 2016
- Gorantla Butchaiah Chowdary 2021
- Chandra Mohan Patowary 2026
