= Pramod Chandra Bhattacharya =

- Born: February 16, 1925
- Died: November 12, 2018
- Occupations: Linguist, folklorist, educationist
- Known for: Folklore
- Awards: Upendranath Brahma Award, Dr. Lila Gogoi Award, Dr. Krishna Kanta Handique Award, Kamrup Ratna Award, Pragya-Bhusan Honour, Kalpadrum Award, Bhasacharya Honour, Bodofa Upendra Nath Brahma Award, Kalicharan Brahma Award, Sramik-Pran Award

Pramod Chandra Bhattacharya was a linguist, folklorist and educationist known for his significant contributions to Assamese and Bodo language and literature.

== Career ==
A researcher with a deep interest in folk culture, he made a lasting impact on the study and preservation of indigenous traditions in Assam. Through his book A Descriptive Analysis of Bodo Language, Bhattacharya played a key role in advancing the Bodo language, contributing to its recognition as a Modern Indian Language (MIL) at the college and university level. His efforts led to Bodo gaining the status of an honor subject, significantly promoting the language within academic institutions and preserving its cultural importance and value.

Bhattacharya began his career as a teacher before becoming the principal of B. Borooah College. He was born in Digheli, Nalbari, and was later awarded an honorary D.Litt by Gauhati University in recognition of his scholarly contributions. For his work, he received the Upendranath Brahma Award.

Bhattacharya's legacy continues to influence scholars and literary enthusiasts in the fields of Assamese and Bodo studies.
