= Diganta Barman =

Indian politician

Member of Assam Legislative Assembly
- In office 21 May 2021 – 4 May 2026
- Preceded by: Narayan Deka
- Succeeded by: Narayan Deka
- Constituency: Barkhetry

Personal details
- Born: 26 November 1964 (age 61)
- Party: Indian National Congress
- Spouse: Kasturi Bharali (m.1994)
- Parent: Bhumidhar Barman (Father) Malati Barman (Mother)
- Education: Gauhati University
- Profession: Politician

Diganta Barman (born 26 November 1964) is an Indian politician and member of Indian National Congress from Assam. He served as the Member of Assam Legislative Assembly for Barkhetry from 2021 to 2026.

== Early life and education ==
Diganta Barman was born on 26 November 1964 to Bhumidhar Barman and Malati Barman. His father was a former Chief Minister who also served as Member of Assam Legislative Assembly for Barkhetry. Diganta Barman was an Indian bureaucrat and former Assam Civil Services (ACS) officer. He completed his Bachelor of Arts in political science from Gauhati University in 1987. He later joined the Assam Civil Services (ACS) and held various administrative positions before resigning to enter politics . He is currently a Member of Legislative Assembly (MLA) of Assam from Barkhetry Constituency. He is married to Kasturi Bharali, an ACS officer currently serving as the Secretary to the GoA; Skill, Employment and Entrepreneurship Department. The couple has 3 daughters: Kamakshi Barman, Bhargaavii Barman and Rijuta Barman.

== Political career ==
Barman was the Indian National Congress candidate for Member of Assam Legislative Assembly for Barkhetry in 2016. He lost to the Bharatiya Janata party’s choice Narayan Deka, Barman got 60,610 while Deka got 69,223 votes in 2016. However, in 2021, he defeated Deka and became the Member of Assam Legislative Assembly for Barkhetry getting 85,826 votes while Deka got 81,772 votes. He was defeated by Deka again in 2026.
