= Birinchi Kumar Barua =

Indian novelist, linguist and scholar (1908–1964)

- Born: 10 November 1908; Puranigudam, Nagaon, Assam, India
- Died: 30 March 1964 (aged 55); Guwahati
- Occupations: Scholar, novelist
- Writing career
- Language: Assamese
- Genre: Assamese literature
- Notable work: Asamar Loka Sanskriti
- Notable awards: Sahitya Akademi Award

Birinchi Kumar Barua (10 November 1908 – 30 March 1964) was a folklorist, scholar, novelist, playwright, historian, linguist, educationist, administrator and eminent 20th century littérateur of Assam, with both scholarly and creative pursuits. He was the pioneer in the study of folklore in North East India, and was one of the many founders of Gauhati University. Barua's contributions to Assamese literature are significant, both as a novelist and as an early literary critic.

== Biography ==
=== Early life and education ===
Birinchi Kumar Barua's father, Bijoy Ram Barua, was in the postal service and later served at the Assam Secretariat at Shillong. Passing the matriculation examination with a First Division from Nowgong Govt High School in 1928, Birinchi Kumar Barua left for Kolkata to pursue higher studies. There he was admitted into Presidency College. In 1930, Barua passed IA in first division and passed BA in 1932 with honours in Pali language. He was awarded the Ishan Scholarship for his outstanding performance by securing the first position in his BA examination. He is one of the few Ishan scholars from Assam, till date. In 1934, he passed MA in Pali language from Calcutta University, again standing first in the University. Simultaneously, he studied law at Calcutta University. After completing his BA, Barua also passed the ICS examination, but the British Government at that time did not appoint him as an Administrative Officer on the ground that he could not ride horses.

In 1935, Calcutta University introduced Assamese as a modern language, and Barua was appointed as a teacher. He taught Assamese in the MA classes. Apart from teaching, he wrote a number of textbooks in Assamese for BA and MA classes of the University. After three years of teaching, he left Kolkata in 1938 and joined Cotton College as a lecturer in Assamese. In 1946, Barua left for England to obtain his PhD.

By the time he left for England, he had written several short stories, a short history of Assamese literature, and perhaps one of the most important novels in modern Assamese literature, Jivanar Batot. His other significant novel written in 1955, Seuji Pataar Kahani, is based on the life in a tea garden of Assam. In London, he studied at the School of Oriental and African Studies under the London University and completed his thesis on the cultural history of Assam. He was awarded a PhD degree in 1948, and his thesis later published as A Cultural History of Assam, is now regarded as a milestone in Assamese historiography.

He contributed greatly to the setting up of the Gauhati University, at Jalukbari, where a large edifice was later built in his name - Birinchi Kumar Barua Auditorium - cum - Lecture Theatre. He was a member of the Indian Film Censor Board and a founder member of the Indian Language Commission constituted by the Government of India. He was the founder of the socio-cultural organisation Assam Academy for Cultural Relations, which still survives, established mainly to forge harmony and unity amongst the various peoples of the North East, belonging to different castes, creeds, and tribes. In 1963, he was a Visiting Professor of Indian Folklore at the Indiana University, Bloomington, US, sponsored by the Rockfeller Foundation. There, he became a close associate of Dr. Richard Mercer Dorson, commonly known as the "father of American folklore".

In 1961, he visited the D.H.S.K. College at Dibrugarh and found that there was a scope for a separate and independent commerce college in the city. He suggested to the authorities of the D.H.S.K. College to separate the commerce section of the college so as to form a full-fledged commerce college. This was how the D.H.S.K. Commerce College was organised as a separate entity. Subsequently, in 1962, he was mainly responsible for setting up the Gauhati Commerce College, where the college's library has been named after him.

Barua was the winner of the Sahitya Academy Award in 1964 for his book in Assamese titled Asomar Loka Sanskrit, awarded posthumously in February 1965.

== Notable publications ==
Novels and short stories

- Jivanar Batot / On the Road of Life (1946)
- Xeuji Pator Kahini / The Story of Green Leaves (1959), written under the pseudonym Rasna Barua, translated by Mrinal Miri as "The Partings"
- Pat Parivartan (1948)
- Aghoni Bai (1950)

Books in English

- A Cultural History of Assam (1951)
- Early Geography of Assam (1952)
- Studies in Early Assamese Literature (1952)
- Modern Assamese Literature (1957)
- Sankaradeva, Vaishnava Saint of Assam (1960)
- Temples and Legends of Assam
- History of Assamese Literature (1964)

Books in Assamese

- Kavya Aru Abhivyanjans (1941)
- Asamiya Katha Sahitya (1950)
- Asamiya Bhasa Aru Sanskriti (1957)
- Asomar Loka Sanskriti (1961)

Travel books

- Switzerland Bhraman (1948)
- Professor Baruar Chithi (1968)

Children's books and textbooks

- Bharat Buranji
- Buranjir Katha (1956)

One-act play

- Ebalar Naat, 1955 (1955)
