= Barkhetri Assembly constituency =

Constituency of the Assam legislative assembly in India

Barkhetri
- Constituency No. 38 for the Assam Legislative Assembly

Constituency details
- Country: India
- Region: Northeast India
- State: Assam
- District: Nalbari
- Lok Sabha constituency: Barpeta
- Established: 1978
- Reservation: None

Barkhetri Assembly constituency is one of the 126 assembly constituencies of Assam Legislative Assembly. Barkhetri forms part of the Barpeta Lok Sabha constituency.

== Town Details ==
- Country: India.
- State: Assam.
- District: Nalbari district
- Lok Sabha Constituency: Barpeta Lok Sabha constituency
- Area Includes: Barbhag Dev. Block(Part), Borigog Banbhag Dev. Block(Part), Barkhetri Dev. Block(Part), Paschim Nalbari Dev. Block(Part)-Dakhin Khetri, Pub Nalbari Dev. Block(Part), Saru Khetri Dev. Block(Part).

== Members of Legislative Assembly ==
Election	Member	Party affiliation
1978	Sheikh Chand Mohammad	Janata Party
1983	Sheikh Chand Mohammad	Indian National Congress
1985	Pulakesh Barua	Independent
1991	Bhumidhar Barman	Indian National Congress
1996	Pulakesh Barua	Asom Gana Parishad
2001	Bhumidhar Barman	Indian National Congress
2006	Bhumidhar Barman	Indian National Congress
2011	Bhumidhar Barman	Indian National Congress
2016	Narayan Deka	Bharatiya Janata Party
2021	Diganta Barman	Indian National Congress
2026	Narayan Deka	Bharatiya Janata Party

== Election results ==
=== 2026 ===
2026 Assam Legislative Assembly election: Barkhetri
Party	Candidate	Votes	%	±%
BJP	Narayan Deka	1,13,001	56.07	
INC	Diganta Barman	84157	41.76	
AITC	Amirul Islam	1418	0.7	
SUCI(C)	Munindra Doley	959	0.48	
NOTA	None of the above	2001	0.99	
Margin of victory		28,844		
Turnout		201536		
Registered electors				
BJP gain from INC		Swing		

=== 2021 ===
2021 Assam Legislative Assembly election: Barkhetry
Party	Candidate	Votes	%	±%
INC	Diganta Barman	85,826	49.46	+8.18
BJP	Narayan Deka	81,772	47.13	−0.02
AJP	Pulakesh Baruah	2,582	1.49	N/A
AIUDF	Champak Kalita	1,106	0.64	−6.13
JD(U)	Santanu Kalita	805	0.46	N/A
Independent	Bhupen Talukdar	487	0.28	−0.1
NOTA	None of the above	941	0.54	+0.01
Majority		4,054	2.33	
Turnout		1,73,519	88.12	−0.75
Registered electors		1,96,918		
INC gain from BJP		Swing		

=== 2016 ===
2016 Assam Legislative Assembly election: Barkhetry
Party	Candidate	Votes	%	±%
BJP	Narayan Deka	69,223	47.15	
INC	Diganta Barman	60,610	41.28	
AIUDF	Akram Hussain Talukdar	9,950	6.77	
Independent	Kamalesh Deka	2,316	1.57	
AITC	Raju Barman	874		
JMBP	Deepak Kalita	670		
Independent	Bhupen Talukdar	551		
Independent	Manomati Das	475		
Independent	Bipul Goswami	382		
Independent	Mantu Baruah	368		
Independent	Raju Deka	347		
LDP	Bhumidhar Barman	255		
NOTA	None of the above	782		
Majority		8,613		
Turnout		1,46,803		
Registered electors		1,65,065		
BJP gain from INC		Swing		
