= B. Borooah College =

College in Assam, India

B. Borooah College (Autonomous)
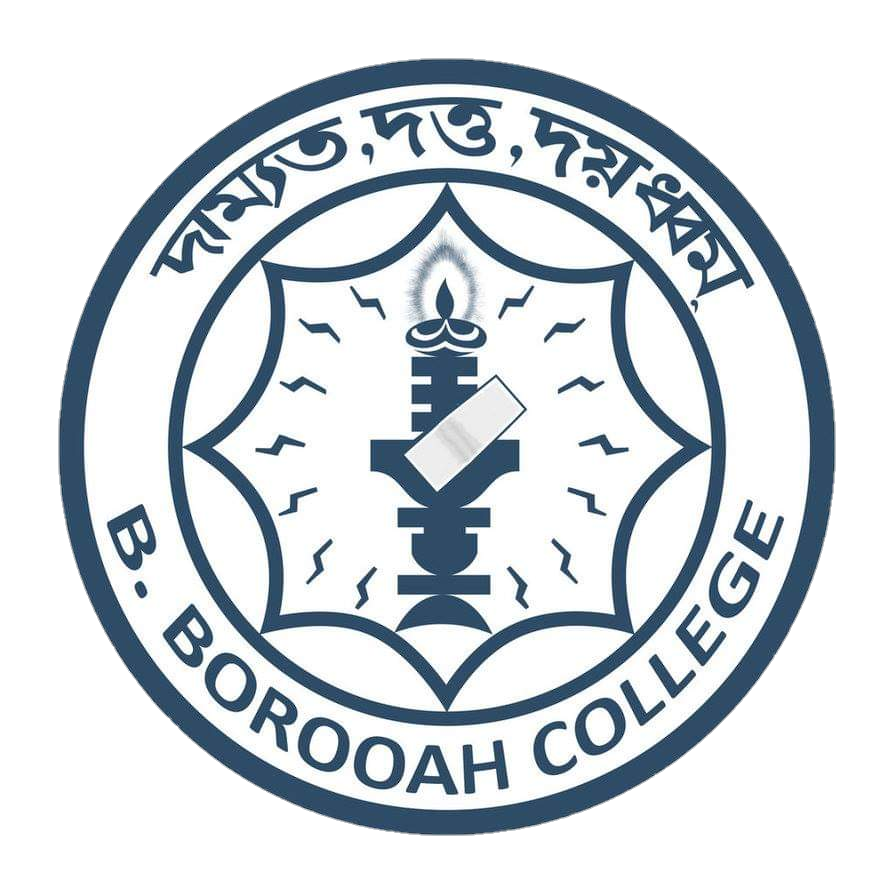
- Motto: Damyata Datta Dayaddham
- Motto in English: Self-Restraint, Charity, Compassion
- Type: Public
- Established: 1943 (83 years ago)
- Founder: Gopinath Bordoloi
- Accreditation: A++
- Affiliations: Gauhati University
- Principal: Dr. Satyendra Nath Barman
- Location: Guwahati, Assam, India; 26.1785533°N 91.7568553°E
- Campus: Urban
- Colors: Grey, white and steel blue
- Website: www.bborooahcollege.ac.in

B. Borooah College (Autonomous), established in 1943, is a degree college situated in Ulubari locality of Guwahati, Assam. It was named after Bholanath Borooah a businessman from Nagaon. This college is affiliated with the Gauhati University.

== Academics ==
=== Academic programmes ===
==== Higher Secondary (HS) ====
- Higher Secondary Arts
- Higher Secondary Science
- Higher Secondary Commerce (self-financed)

==== Bachelor of Arts (BA) ====
- B.A. Honours with a Minor
- Certificate Course in JLPT

==== Master of Arts (MA) ====
- Postgraduate Course in Chemistry (self-financed)
- Postgraduate Course in Botany (self-financed)
- Postgraduate Course in Zoology (self-financed)
- Postgraduate Course in Geography (self-financed)

==== Doctor of Philosophy (Ph.D.) programs ====
- Ph.D. in Assamese
- Ph.D. in Botany
- Ph.D. in Chemistry
- Ph.D. in Sanskrit
- Ph.D. in Mathematics
- Ph.D. in Zoology

== Academic facilities ==
=== Star College Scheme ===
B. Borooah College has been supported under the Star College Scheme, which is sponsored by the Department of Biotechnology (DBT), Ministry of Science and Technology, Government of India, starting from 2012. This initiative provides financial assistance to enhance life science and biotechnology education and training at the undergraduate level. The scheme benefits four science departments at the college: Zoology, Botany, Chemistry, and Physics. The funding under this scheme is utilized to improve laboratory infrastructure with modern equipment and consumables. The departments are engaged in organizing programs such as seminars on biotechnology, student awareness initiatives, and visits to advanced laboratories and institutions. These activities are aimed at familiarizing students with contemporary biotechnological tools and techniques. Additionally, the scheme supports exposure visits to neighboring institutes to assist students with project and dissertation work, as well as the acquisition of relevant books and journals.

=== Institutional Biotech Hub ===
Since 2016, the College has operated an Institutional Biotech Hub, supported financially by the Department of Biotechnology (DBT), Government of India. The Biotech Hub enables faculty and students to conduct scientific experiments across various scientific disciplines, with a focus on chemical and biological sciences. The Hub regularly hosts student-centric workshops, seminars, and competitions, such as poster presentations and science quizzes, to foster scientific interest and skills. The activities and outcomes of the Biotech Hub have led to the college's selection as an Advanced Level Biotech Hub by the DBT. The college has developed a research ecosystem by providing facilities to co-researchers from other institutions.

=== North East Corner ===
The North East Corner of the library features a specialized collection of books focusing on the language, literature, art, culture, history, social sciences, and technological development of North-East India.

=== Heritage Corner ===
The Heritage Corner in the college serves as a dedicated space for documenting the institution's history. It preserves records and works related to notable individuals associated with the college respectively.

== Accreditation ==
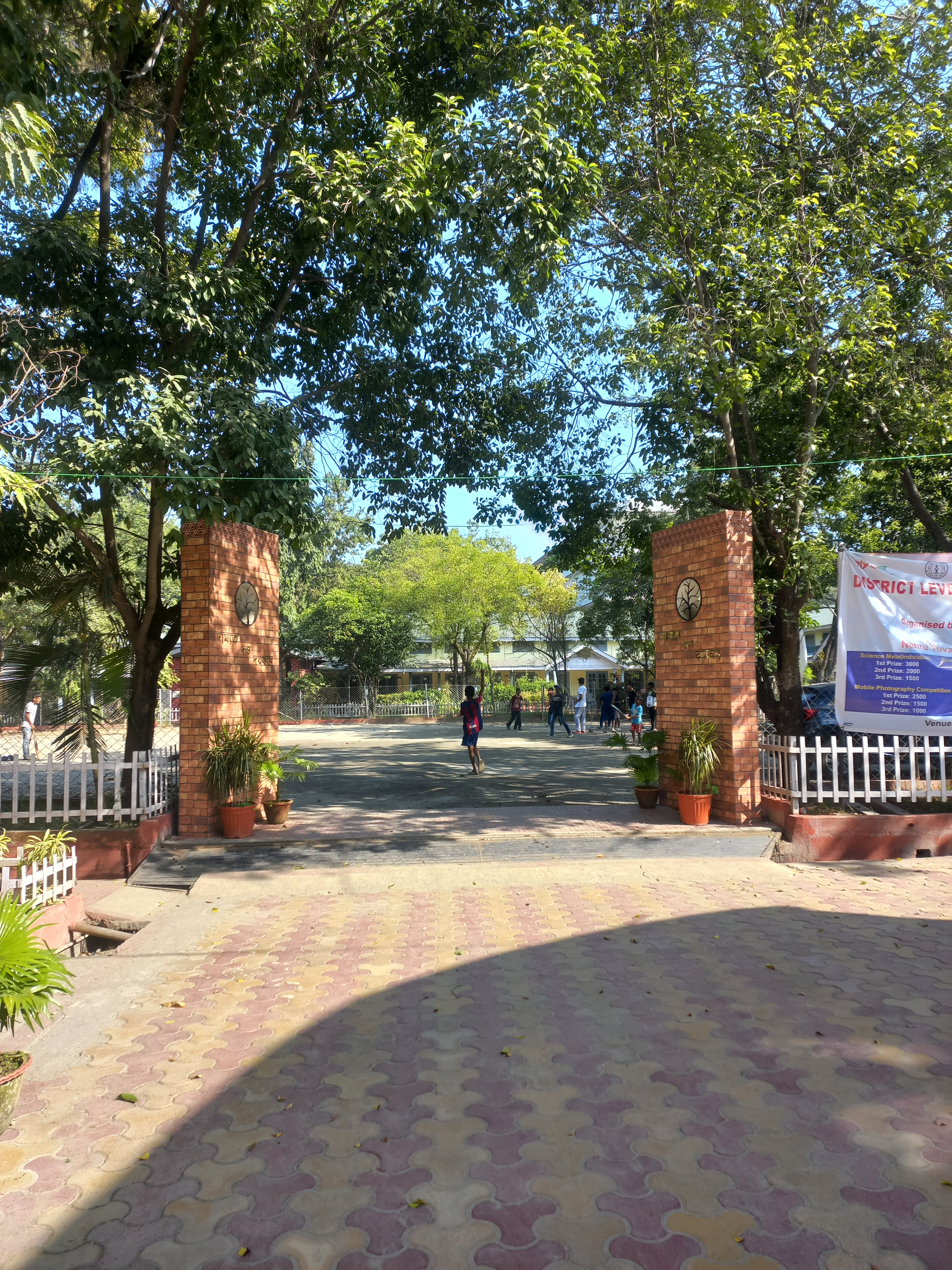
A view of B. Borooah College playground

- The College was accredited with a cumulative grade point average of 3.62 on a four-point scale and awarded an "A++" grade by the National Assessment and Accreditation Council (NAAC). This score is the highest among colleges in Northeast India, ranking it 1st among Gauhati University-affiliated institutions.
- In 2024 University Grants Commission (UGC) grants B. Borooah College as Autonomous college.

== Admission ==
=== Undergraduate (UG) ===
==== Session (2017-18) ====
B. Borooah College announced the cut-off marks for BA courses for the academic year 2018. The cut-off for the undergraduate Arts programs remained unchanged from the previous year. For the day shift in the BA program, the cut-off score was set at 83% for the unreserved category, while the afternoon shift recorded a cut-off of 77.5% for the same category. In 2017, the day shift cut-off for BA courses was 83.6%, and the afternoon shift cut-off was 78.5%.

A total of 510 seats in the BA program were filled during the admission process. The college principal, Satyendra Nath Barman, indicated that major (honours) courses would be offered to students after departmental interviews, which are to be conducted for selected students at a later date. B. Borooah College serves a diverse student population, including applicants from various northeastern states and Assam.

==== Session (2023-24) ====
B. Borooah College has announced the cut-off marks for admission to its highly demanding undergraduate programs for the academic year 2023-2024.

==== Botany ====
In the Department of Botany, the cut-off marks for the General Category are set at 85%, while the OBC category requires a cut-off of 84%. For the SC category, the cut-off is 82%, and for the ST (Plains) category, it is 83%. The ST (Hills) category has a cut-off mark of 81%.

==== Chemistry ====
For the Department of Chemistry, the cut-off for the General Category is significantly higher at 93%. The OBC category has a cut-off of 88%, while the SC category requires a minimum of 90%. Both ST (Plains) and ST (Hills) categories have a cut-off of 90% and 73%, respectively.

==== Economics ====
In the Department of Economics, the General Category cut-off is set at 92%, with the OBC category at 90%. The SC category requires a cut-off of 89%, while the ST (Plains) category has a cut-off of 90% and the ST (Hills) category has a cut-off of 86%.

==== English ====
The Department of English has established its General Category cut-off at 89%, followed by an OBC cut-off of 87%. The SC category has a cut-off of 86%, while the ST (Plains) and ST (Hills) categories require cut-offs of 83% and 81%, respectively.

==== Assamese ====
In the Department of Assamese, the cut-off for the General Category is 71%, while the OBC category requires a cut-off of 65%. The SC category has a lower cut-off mark of 60%.

==== Education ====
Lastly, for the Department of Education, the General Category cut-off is set at 82%, with an OBC cut-off of 78%. The SC category requires a cut-off of 77%, while both the ST (Plains) and ST (Hills) categories have cut-offs of 78% and 70%, respectively.

== Seat Capacity ==
Courses Offered
Sl. No.	Course	Intake Capacity
1	Higher Secondary Arts	320
2	Higher Secondary Science	240
3	Higher Secondary Commerce (Self-financed)	130
4	Four Year Undergraduate Programme in Arts with one major - two minors (B.A. with Honours)	540
5	Four Year Undergraduate Programme in Arts with three minors (B.A. without Honours)	150
6	Four Year Undergraduate Programme in Science with one major - two minors (B.Sc. with Honours)	250
7	Four Year Undergraduate Programme in Science with three minors (B.Sc. without Honours)	100
8	Four Year Undergraduate Programme in Information Technology (B.Sc.-IT) (Self-financed)	25
9	Four Year Undergraduate Programme in Business Administration (BBA) (Self-financed)	40
10	Post Graduate Course in Chemistry (Self-financed)	17
11	Post Graduate Course in Botany (Self-financed)	15
12	Post Graduate Course in Geography (Self-financed)	20
13	Post Graduate Course in Zoology (Self-financed)	15
14	Ph.D. Programme in Assamese, Botany, Chemistry, Sanskrit, Mathematics, Zoology	As per UGC guideline

Department-wise Total Number of Seats (Major and Minor) for Admission under Four Years Undergraduate Programme
Sl. No.	Department	No. of Seats (Major)	No. of Seats (Minor)
1	Botany	40	200
2	Bengali	-	100
3	Chemistry	30	250
4	Mathematics (Science and Arts)	60	200
5	Physics	40	200
6	Statistics	30	80
7	Zoology	40	200
8	Assamese	70	200
9	Economics	70	240
10	Education	50	250
11	English	70	200
12	Geography (Arts & Science)	40	200
13	Hindi	50	120
14	History	50	250
15	Philosophy	50	150
16	Political Science	70	300
17	Sanskrit	30	60
18	Information Technology	25	-
19	Business Administration	40	-

== Campus ==
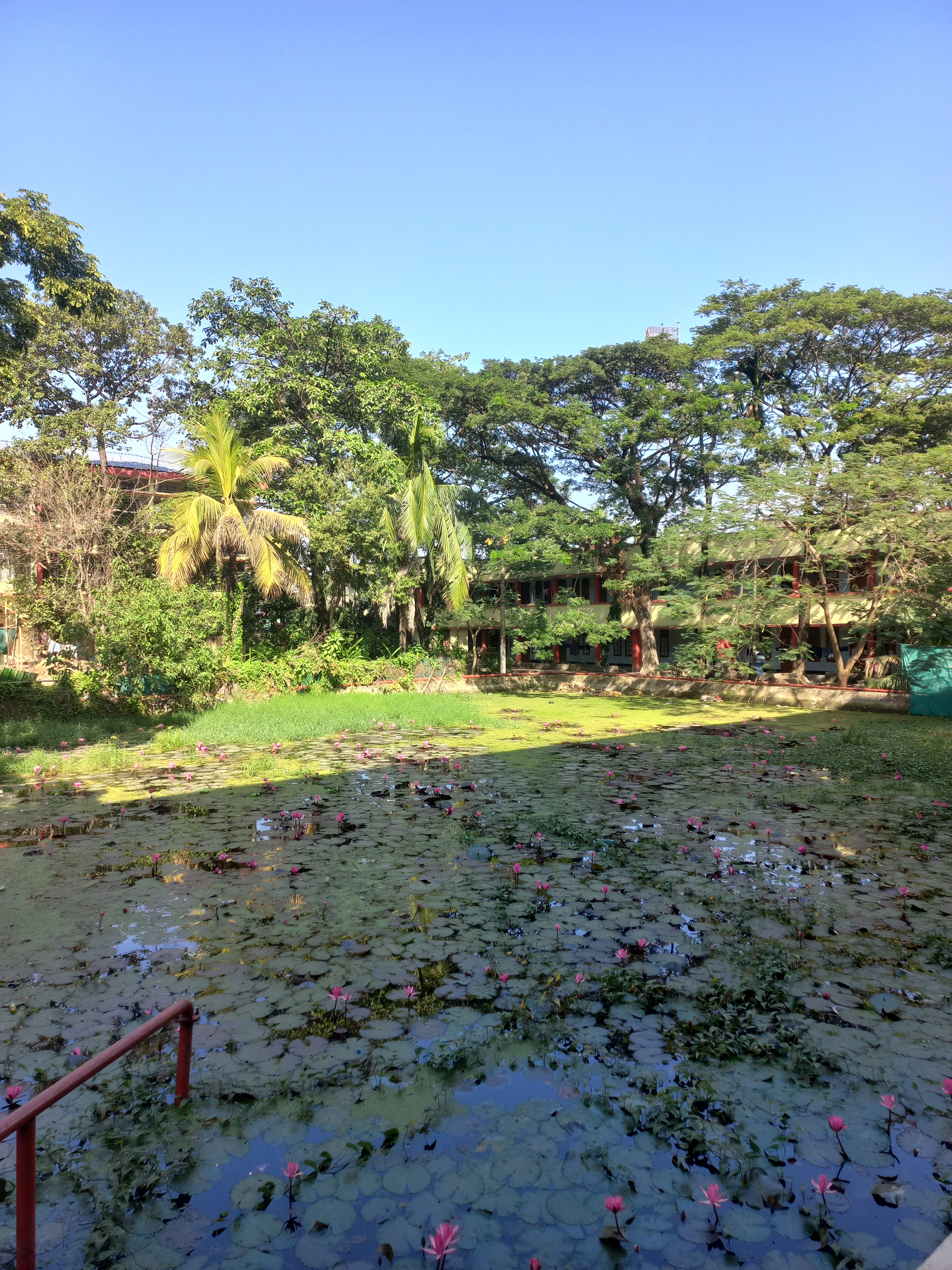
B. Borooah College pond and Boys hostel view

B. Borooah College has a campus area of 1,66,733 square feet, which is approximately 3.83 acres. The total built-up area of the college is 84,173 square feet, or roughly 1.93 acres. The vacant area on the campus is approximately 1.90 acres. The college also has a pond near the boys' hostel. It is the third-largest affiliated college of Gauhati University by area.

On September 13, 2024, Chief Minister Himanta Biswa Sarma announced a grant of ₹10 crore along with additional land allocations to facilitate the expansion of the B. Borooah College campus area. The expansion plan includes nearby areas, incorporating the entire Haji Musafir Khana, Islampur's 14-acre Kabristan land, for its infrastructure and academic expansion.

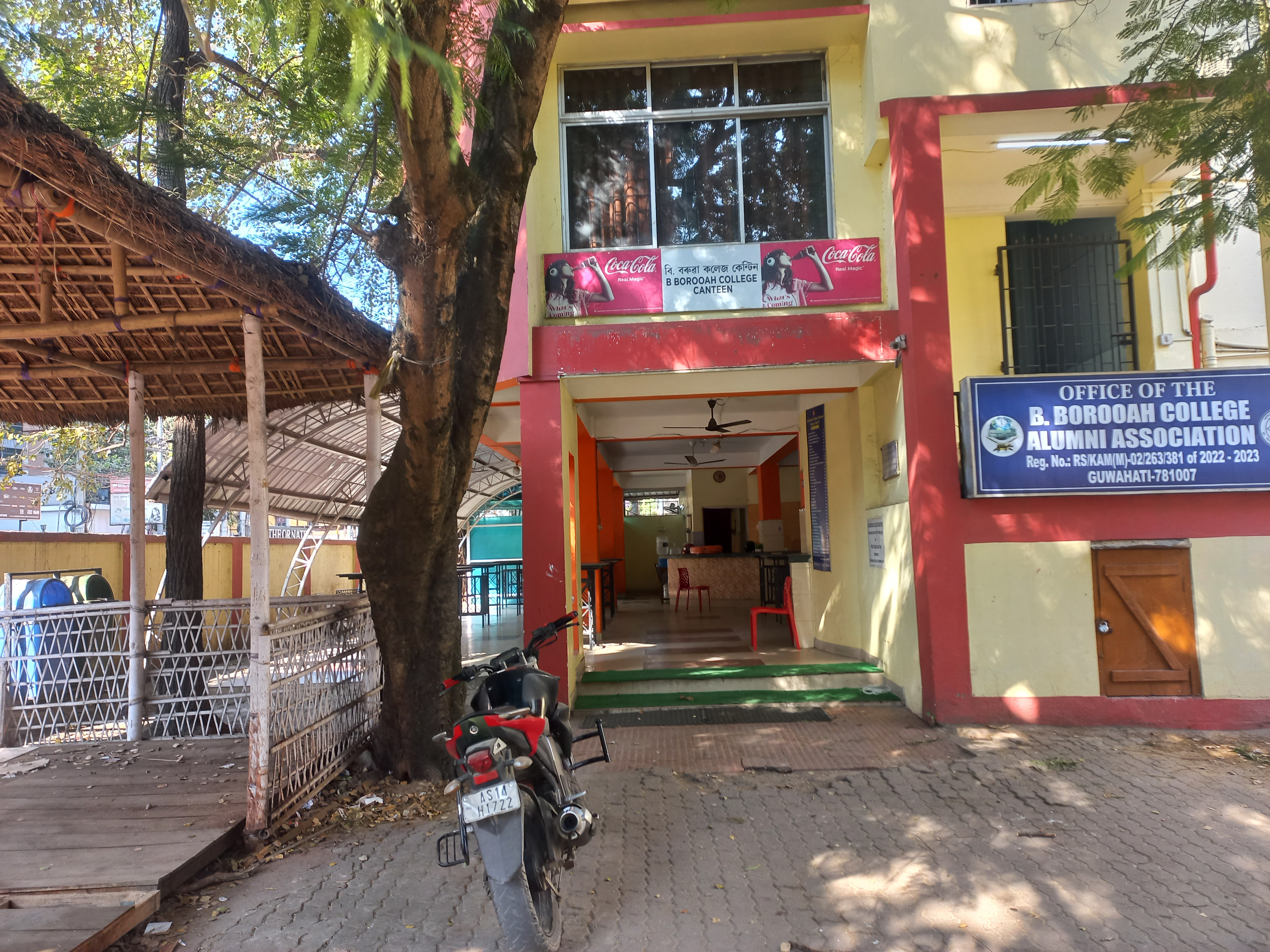
A view of B. Borooah College Canteen

The college canteen, inaugurated on April 6, 2012, by Dr. Tabu Ram Taid, the president of the College Governing Body, serves as a central gathering place for students.

The stationery corner, situated near the college entrance, offers stationery items, books, and magazines. It also provides photocopying and desktop publishing (DTP) services.

== Departments ==
=== Science ===
- Physics
- Mathematics
- Chemistry
- Statistics
- Botany
- Zoology
- Geography

=== Arts ===
- Assamese
- Bengali
- English
- Sanskrit
- History
- Education
- Economics
- Philosophy
- Political Science
- Hindi
- Geography

== Facilities ==
=== Auditorium ===
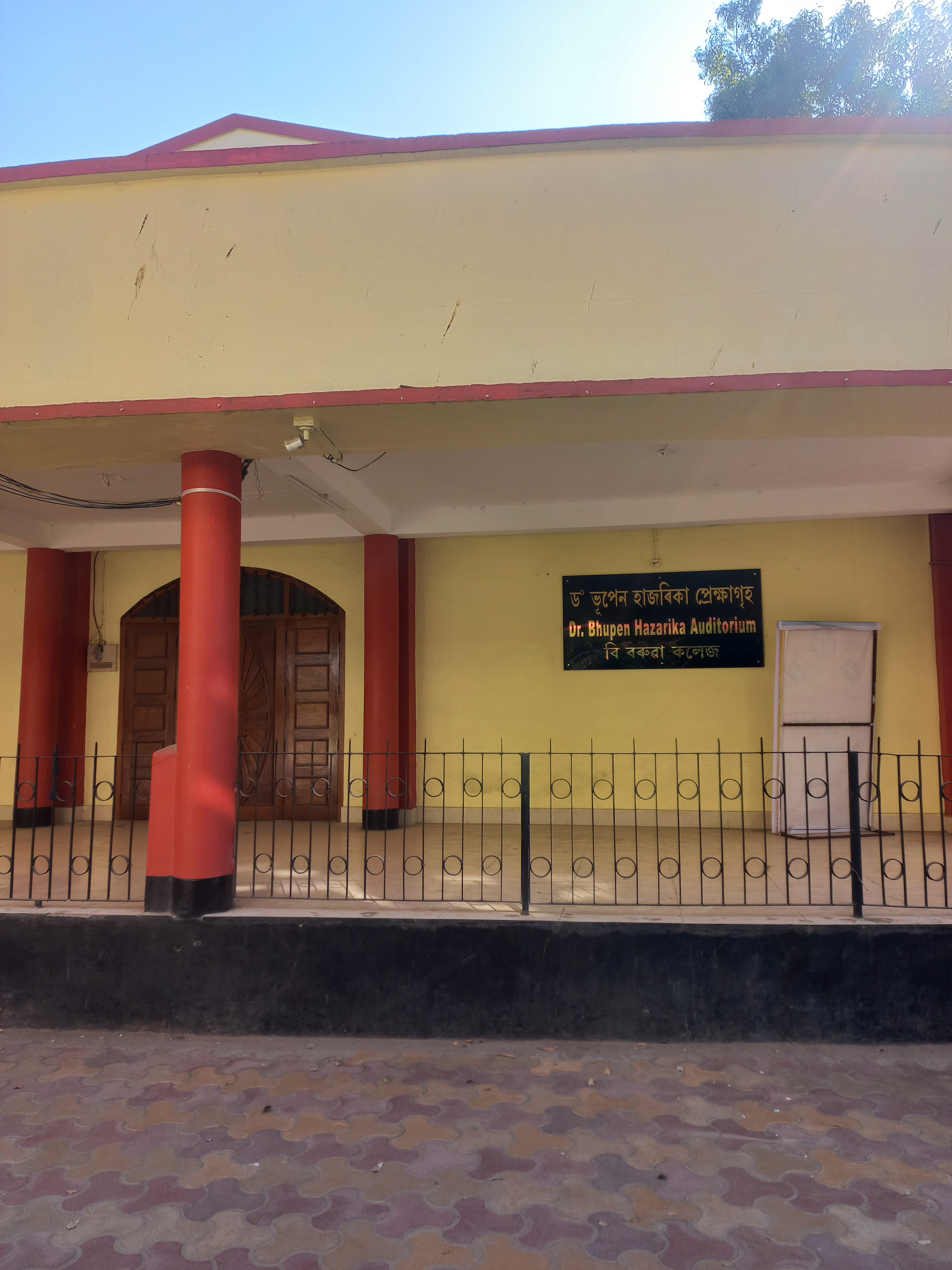
A view of B. Borooah College auditorium

The auditorium of B. Borooah College is a central hub for various academic and cultural activities, located near the entry gate of the college campus. Primarily designed to host functions, it is a spacious and well-structured venue equipped to accommodate a large number of attendees. The auditorium plays a crucial role during the admission process for Higher Secondary (HS), Undergraduate (UG), and Postgraduate (PG) programs, as all admission-related formalities and procedures are conducted here annually. Beyond admissions, it is frequently used for college events such as seminars, workshops, cultural programs, and academic ceremonies. Its convenient location near the entry gate and the availability of essential amenities make it an indispensable space for fostering the academic and extracurricular environment of the institution.

=== Hostel ===
The double storied building of B. Borooah College Hostel that exists was built in 1964 with the funds of the UGC, Assam Government and college itself. The two stories R.C.C building comprises total 31 rooms that accommodates 122 boarders of higher secondary, degree and master's degree students of the college. The hostel has a managing committee, comprising superintendent and faculty members of the college and headed by the Principal as president. Two monitors from final year degree students are appointed as monitor of ground and first floor to assist the superintendent of the hostel. A mess committee is also constructed each year to look after the mess and entire internal matter of the hostel.

=== Gymnasium ===
The institution has a gymnasium hall. It was inaugurated by Former "Mr. World" Mahadeb Deka on 18 March 2013.

=== Library ===
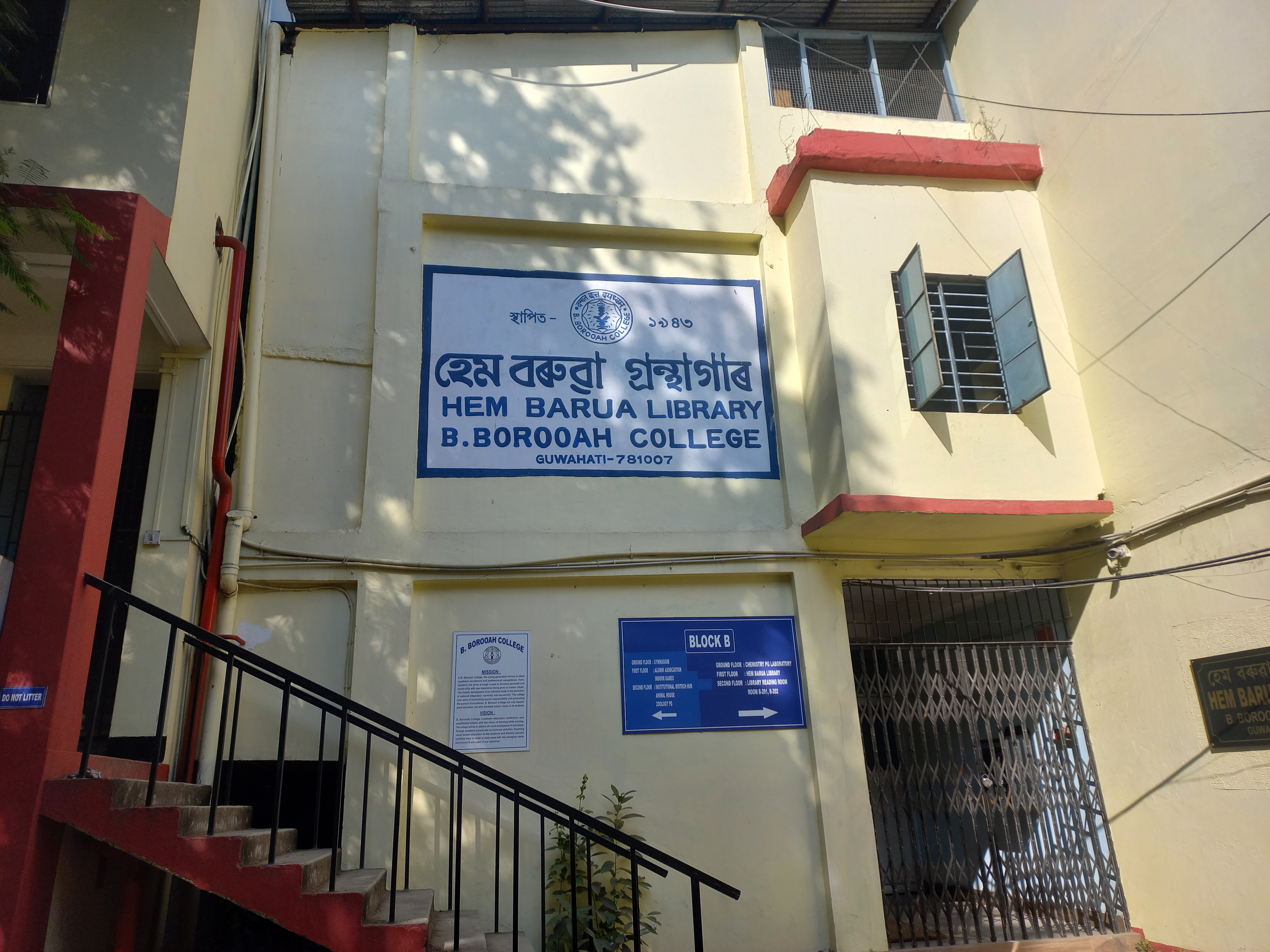
A view of Hem Barua Library

The College Library began operating in 1943 at Kamrup Academy School. It moved to a new building in 1958 and was relocated to its current building in 2000. That same year, the library was renamed "Hem Barua Library" in honor of Hem Barua, the college's third principal and a prominent parliamentarian and educationist. The library provides a wide range of books and resources to support the various academic programs.

== History ==
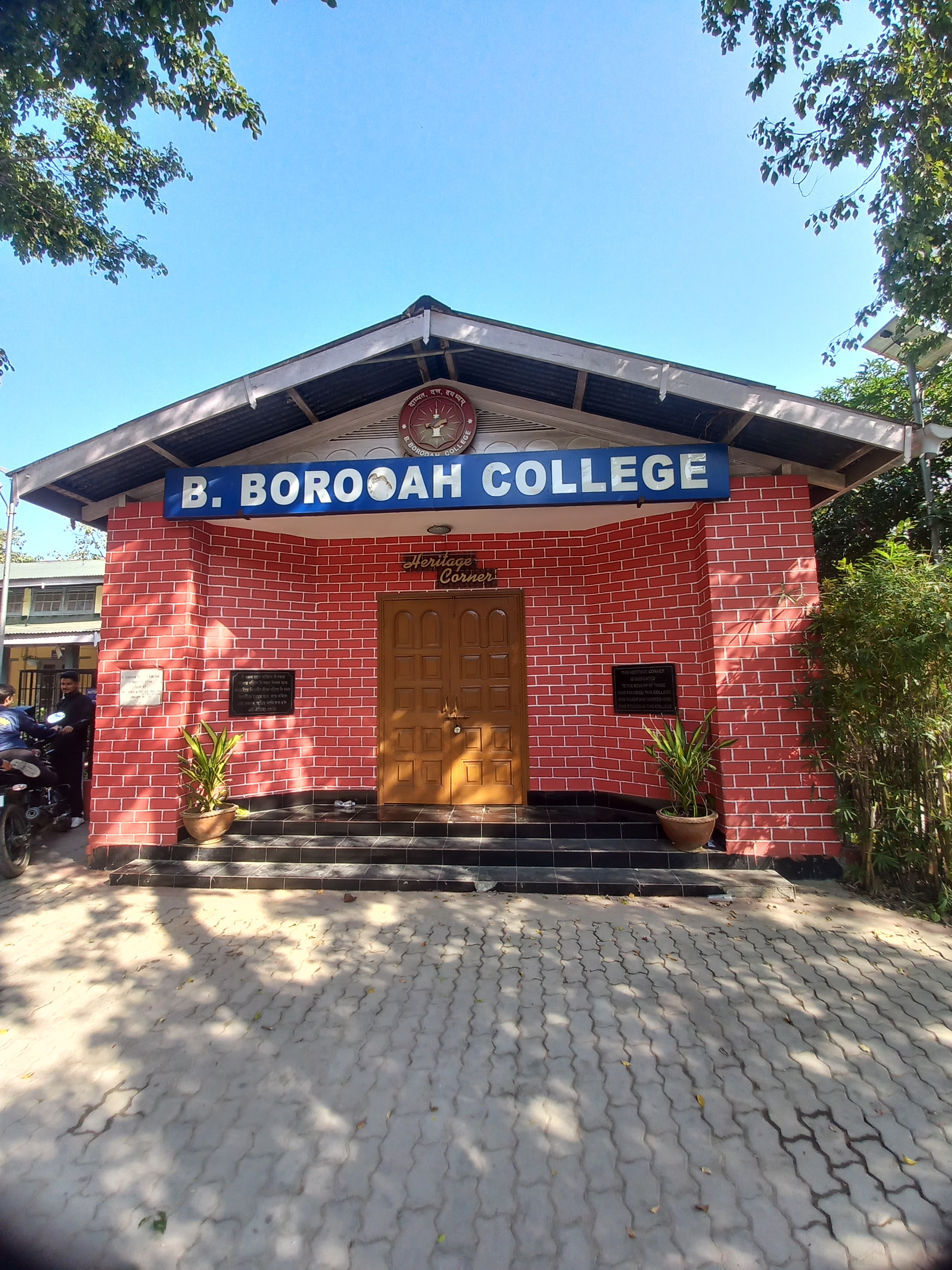
A view of the college heritage corner

The college grew under the shadow of World War II and as a part of the nationalistic struggle against foreign rule. The college was initially established as a night college to provide opportunities for poor students who worked during the day to pursue higher education. It has been linked with many notable figures, including Bharat Ratna Gopinath Bordoloi, Assam's first Chief Minister, who was also the founder and first honorary principal. Bordoloi, along with other nationalist leaders and educators from Assam, decided to create the college in Guwahati after British authorities barred students from Cotton College who had participated in the freedom movement. This group of nationalist leaders formed the college's first Governing Body in 1942. However, classes could not commence immediately due to the wartime conditions and the Quit India Movement. The college officially began its evening classes in September 1943, starting with 15 students.

== Notable alumni ==
- Jahnu Baruah, Indian film director
- Adil Hussain, actor
- Zubeen Garg, singer, songwriter and actor
- Anwaruddin Choudhury, naturalist
- Pijush Hazarika, Assam Legislative Assembly member
- Jayanta Malla Baruah, Assam Legislative Assembly member
- Hiren Bhattacharyya, poet and lyricist
- Moinul Haque, artist
- Pramod Chandra Bhattacharya, linguist, folklorist and educationist
- Lovlina Borgohain, boxer
- Ramen Baruah, music director and singer
