= Trinamool Gana Parishad =

- Founder: Atul Bora
- Founded: 2000
- Headquarters: Ananda Plaza Complex, 4th Floor, Ganeshguri Chariali, Guwahati – 781006
- ECI Status: Registered Unrecognised Party

Election symbol
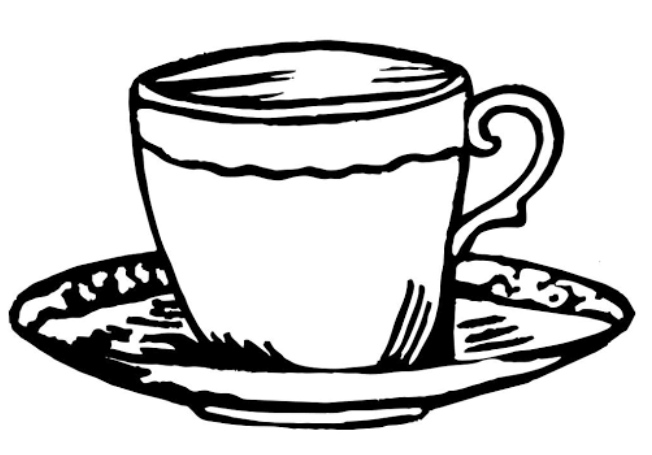

Party flag

Trinamool Gana Parishad (Grassroot Peoples Association) was a political party in the Indian state of Assam.

== History ==
TGP formed as a splinter group of Asom Gana Parishad in 2000. The party was led by Atul Bora, then Public Works Department Minister in the Prafulla Mahanta Cabinet. The party was allotted "Cup & Saucer" as election symbol.

== General elections ==
In the state assembly elections of 2001 in Assam, TGP made an alliance with Bharatiya Janata Party.

In the Lok Sabha elections of 2004, TGP put up one candidate, Deben Dutta from Guwahati. Dutta received 14,933 votes (1.69% of total votes polled).

== Leaders ==
- Atul Bora
- Deben Dutta
- Pulakesh Barua
