= Tihu =

- Town
- Location in Assam, India Tihu (India)
- Coordinates: 26.4749°N 91.2689°E
- Country: India
- State: Assam
- District: Nalbari

Government
  - Body: Tihu Town Committee

Population (2001)
  - Total: 4,301
- Time zone: UTC+5:30 (IST)
- Vehicle registration: AS

Tihu (Pron:ˈtɪhuː) is a town and a town area committee established in 1951 in Nalbari district in the Indian state of Assam.

== Demographics ==
As of 2001 India census, Tihu had a population of 4301. Males constitute 53% of the population and females 47%. Tihu town has an average literacy rate of almost 80%, much higher than the national average of 59.5%: male literacy is 84%, and female literacy is 79%. In Tihu, 10% of the population is under 6 years of age.
