= Sonai =

Sonai Sonaimukh
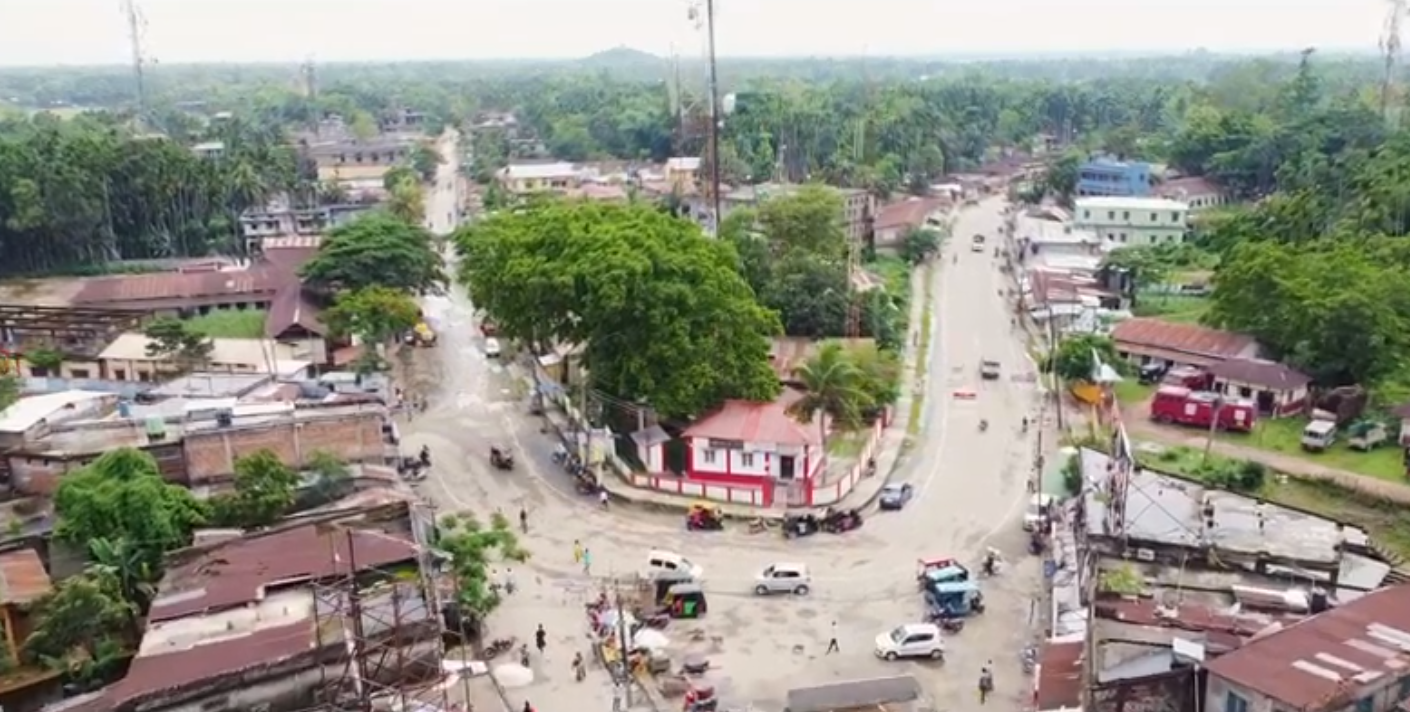
- Municipality Sonai

- Location within Assam Location within India
- Coordinates: 24.7333°N 92.89°E
- Country: India
- State: Assam
- District: Cachar

Government
  - Body: Sonai Municipal Board
- Elevation: 31 m (102 ft)

Population (2011)
  - Total: 20,000

Language
  - Official: Bengali
  - Associate official language: Meitei (Manipuri)
- Time zone: UTC+5:30 (IST)
- Postal code: 788119
- Vehicle registration: AS-11

Sonai (Pron:/'sə(ʊ)'nʌɪ) is a town in the Cachar district in the Indian state of Assam. It is also the name of a circle and block in the town. Government of Assam declared it as a municipal area on 2016 with 11 wards. The River Sonai flows through the town of Sonai joining with Barak River near Dungripar Village of Sonai. The Chandragiri Park and an Archeological site, a temple of Kachari Kingdom at Shivtilla (Changutilla) near Madhab Chandra Das College (MCD College) is a famous place to visit.

== Geography ==
It is located 18.5 km from District Headquarters Silchar.

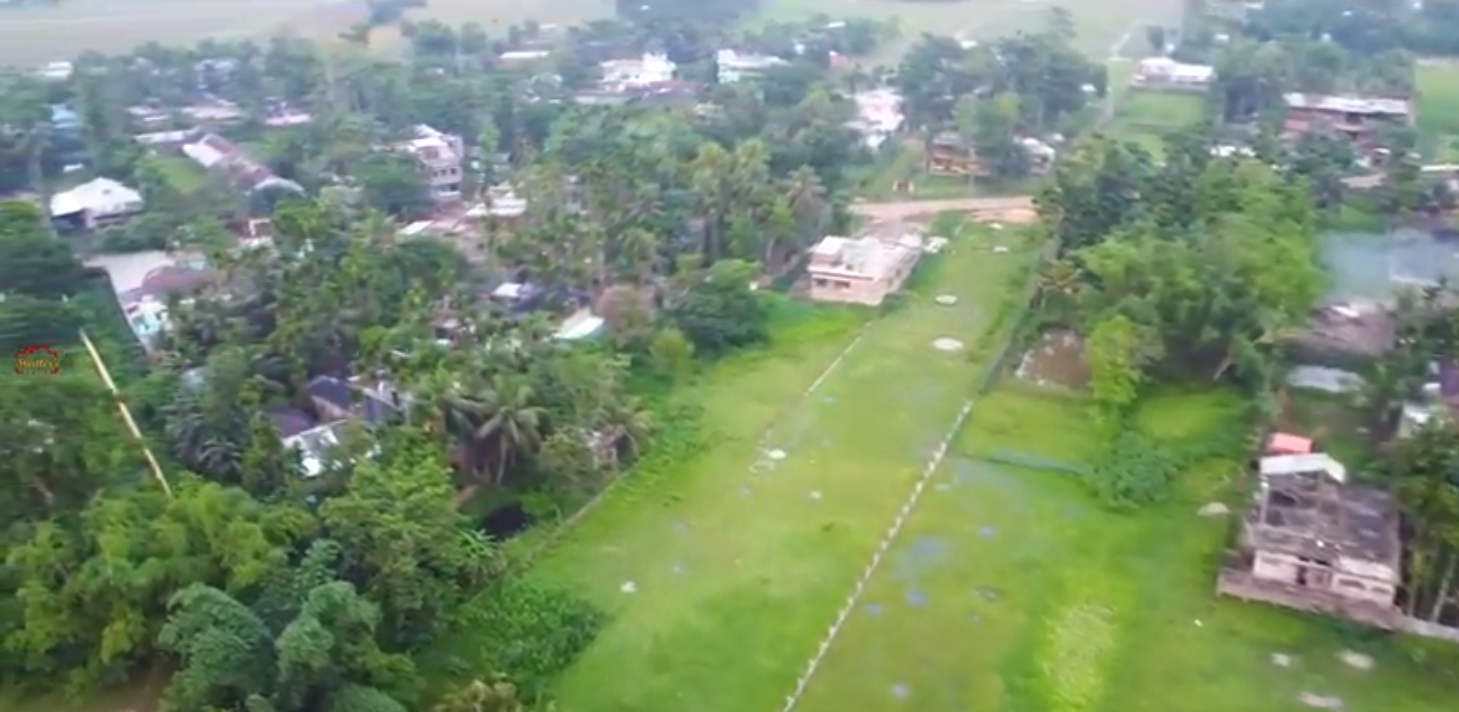
Paddy field of sonai

== Demographics ==
Bengali and Meitei (Manipuri) are the official languages of this place.

As per the 2011 census of India, Sonai had a total population of 324,315, of which 51% were male and 49% were female. Sonai has an average literacy rate of 80%, with a male literacy rate of 54% and female literacy rate of 46%.

== Division ==
There is one Revenue Circle containing 203 Revenue Villages and three Development Blocks: Sonai Development Block, Narsingpur Development Block and Palonghat Development Block.

== Education ==
The institution of Barak Valley like National Institute of Technology, Silchar, Assam University, Silchar Campus, and Silchar Medical College and Hospital falls under Sonai (Vidhan Sabha constituency).

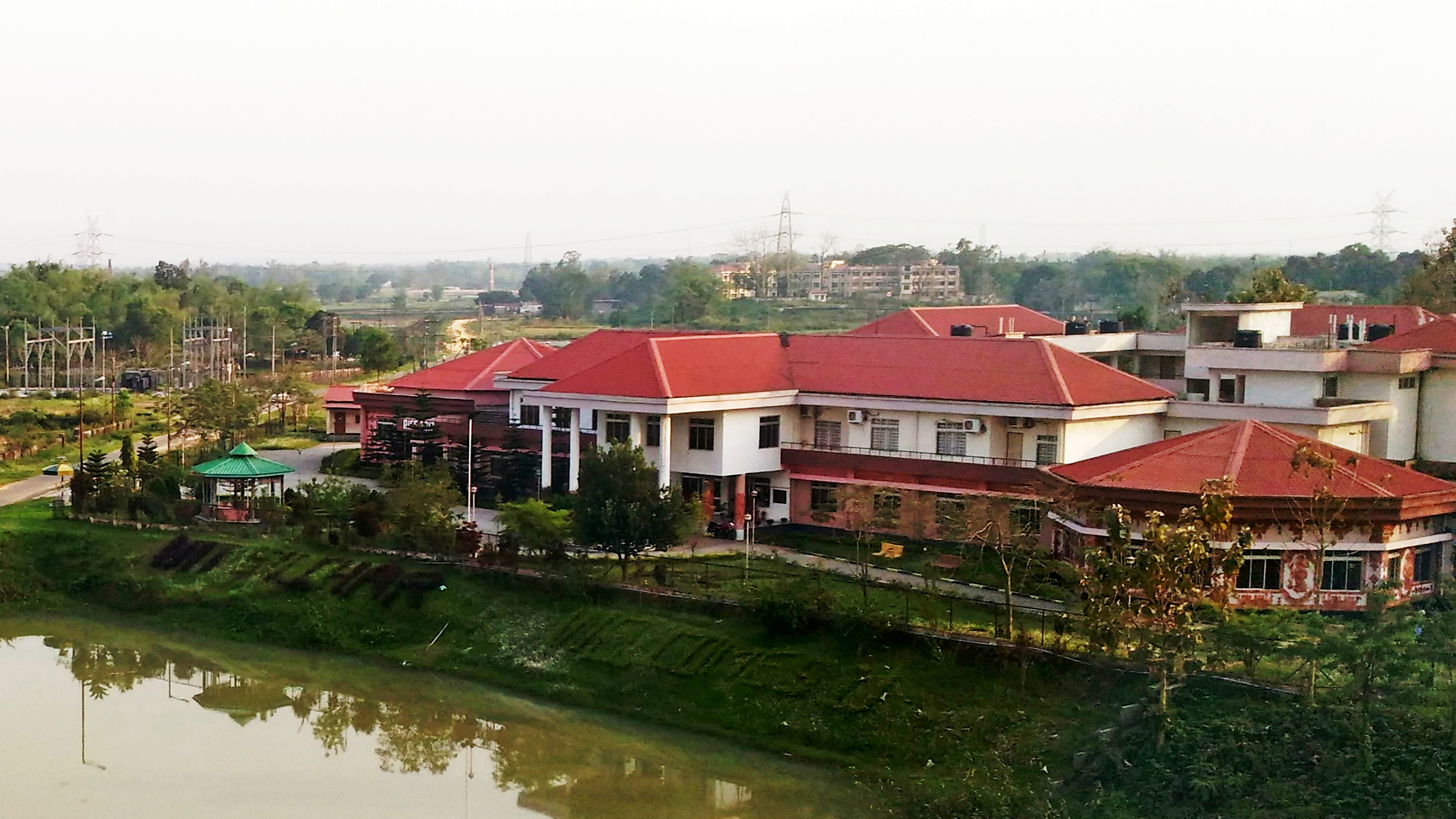
National Institute of Technology, Silchar

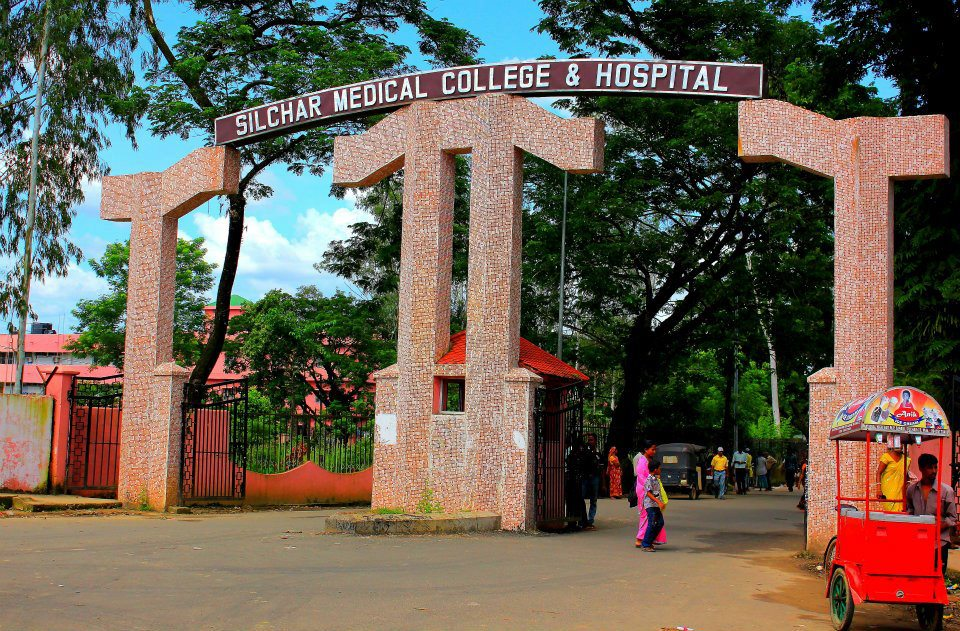
Silchar Medical College

=== Colleges ===
- Janata College, Kabuganj, Sonai
- Presidency Junior College
- Horizon Junior College
- A P J Abdulkalam Junior College
- Sonai Junior College
- Kabuganj Junior College
- Barak Horizon Junior College

=== Schools ===
Government/Provisionalised Schools

- Sonai Nitya Gopal Higher Secondary School
- Moinul Hoque Choudhury Higher Secondary School
- Sonai Senior Madrassa
- Ram Dulal Roy Higher Secondary school
- Satkarakandi High School
- East Kazidhar High School
- Sonai Jubati Singha Manipuri High School
- Abid Raja M E school
- Sonai Madya Banga School
- Bagpur High School
- Sonai M E School
- Swadhin Bazar High School
- Amtola M E School
- Monohar Ali High School
- 182 No. Sonai Model Primary School
- Sonai MV School

Private Schools

- Holy Light English School
- Sonai Adarsha Vidya Niketan
- Gyan Kamal Vidyalaya
- Iqra Academy
- Swadeshi Vidyalaya
- Gyan Vikash School
- Woodland English School
- Pally Unnoyon Vidyalaya
- A.K. Azad and F.A. Memorial School
- New Millennium English School
- Brighter English School
- Bidya Bawan
- Sonai Vidya Bhavan
- Sona Vidya Peet
- Sonai Navajyoti Gyanpith

== Transport ==
=== Air Port ===
Kumbhirgram - Silchar Airport

IATA Code: IXS

IATA Code: IXS

Address: Silchar Airport, Kumbhirgram Airport Road, Silchar – 788109, Assam

=== Rail ===
No railway stations are nearby. However, Silchar Railway Station is 20 kilometres away.

=== Road ===
The national highway NH 306 passes through the town and connects to Mizoram State and Sonai Road.

== Politics ==
Sonai is part of Silchar Lok Sabha constituency. It is also a part of Sonai (Vidhan Sabha constituency).

== Notable people ==
- Moinul Hoque Choudhury, Former Minister of Industrial Development, Government of India
- Aminul Haque Laskar, Deputy Speaker of Assam Leglestive Assembly
- Kutub Ahmed Mazumder, Former Member of Legislative Assembly

== List of MLA's of Sonai ==
- 1951: Nanda Kishore Sinha, Indian National Congress
- 1957: Nanda Kishore Sinha, Indian National Congress
- 1962: Pulakeshi Singh, Indian National Congress
- 1967: M. M. Choudhury, Indian National Congress
- 1972: Nurul Haque Choudhury, Indian National Congress
- 1978: Altaf Hossain Mazumdar, Janata Party
- 1980: Nurul Haque Choudhury, Indian National Congress
- 1985: Abdul Rob Laskar, Indian National Congress
- 1991: Badrinarayan Singh, Bharatiya Janata Party
- 1996: Anwar Hussain Laskar, Asom Gana Parishad
- 2001: Anwar Hussain Laskar, Samajwadi Party
- 2006: Kutub Ahmed Mazumder, Indian National Congress
- 2011: Anamul Haque, Indian National Congress
- 2016: Aminul Haque Laskar, Bharatiya Janata Party
- 2021: Karim Uddin Barbhuiya, All India United Democratic Front
