= 1962 Assam Legislative Assembly election =

Legislative Assembly election in Assam, India

- 19 February 1962

All 105 seats in the Assam Legislative Assembly 53 seats needed for a majority
- Registered: 4,942,816
- Turnout: 51.05%
	Majority party	Minority party
	INC	APH
Leader	Bimala Prasad Chaliha
Party	INC	APHLC
Seats before	71	New
Seats won	79	11
Seat change	▲8	New
Popular vote	48.25%	5.51%
CM before election
Bimala Prasad Chaliha
INC
Elected CM
Bimala Prasad Chaliha
INC

Elections to the Assam Legislative Assembly were held in February 1962. A total of 409 candidates contested the 105 constituencies. 101 men and four women were elected. The Indian National Congress won the popular vote and a majority of seats and Bimala Prasad Chaliha was appointed as the Chief Minister of Assam. The All Party Hill Leaders Conference won eleven seats and independent contestants won eight seats.

Of the 105 seats in the Legislative Assembly, 77 were general, 23 were for scheduled tribes and five were for scheduled castes.

== Results ==
Party	Votes	%	Seats	+/–
INC	1,179,305	48.25	79	▲8
Praja Socialist Party	310,093	12.69	6	▼2
Communist Party of India	156,153	6.39	0	▼3
All Party Hill Leaders Conference	134,591	5.51	11	▲11
Socialist	36,672	1.50	0	Steady
Revolutionary Communist Party of India	29,249	1.20	1	Steady
Bharatiya Jan Sangh	10,887	0.45	0	Steady
Achik Assona Chilchakgipa Kotak	5,169	0.21	0	Steady
Independent	582,042	23.81	8	▼17
Total	2,444,161	100.00	105	–
Valid votes	2,444,161	78.38		
Invalid/blank votes	674,225	21.62		
Total votes	3,118,386	100.00		
Registered voters/turnout	4,942,816	63.09		

=== Results by constituency ===
Assembly Constituency		Winner				Runner Up				Margin
#	Name	Candidate	Party	Votes	%	Candidate	Party	Votes	%	Margin
1	Lungleh (ST)	Saprawnga	APHLC	5563	45.77	R. Dengthuama	IND	4513	37.13	1050
2	Aijal East (ST)	Raymond Thanhlira	APHLC	10321	84.18	Lalsawia	INC	1939	15.82	8382
3	Aijal West (ST)	Ch. Chhunga	APHLC	16070	73.58	A. Thanglura	INC	5771	26.42	10299
4	Ratabari	Baidyanath Mookerjee	INC	13403	42.71	Biswanath Upadhyaya	PSP	12081	38.50	1322
5	Patharkandi (SC)	Ramdeb Mallah	INC	17652	65.65	Gopesh Namasudra	CPI	9234	34.35	8418
6	Karimganj South	Abdul Munim Choudhury	INC	9881	35.47	Jajneswar Das	CPI	6914	24.82	2967
7	Karimganj North	Rathindra Nath Sen	IND	12922	39.12	Ranendra Mohan Das	INC	10601	32.09	2321
8	Katigora	Tarapada Bhattacharjee	IND	15358	57.10	Abdul Hamid Mazumder	INC	11541	42.90	3817
9	Badarpur	Abdul Jalil Choudhury	INC	13062	54.97	Kumud Ranjan Chakravarty	IND	8123	34.18	4939
10	Hailakandi	Rampirit Rudrapaul	IND	11681	44.52	Abdul Matlib Mazumdar	INC	8937	34.06	2744
11	Katlicherra	Gouri Shankar Roy	INC	11700	45.05	Badanmal Surana	IND	6230	23.99	5470
12	Silchar West	Nanda Kishore Sinha	IND	14240	41.97	Mohitosh Purkayastha	INC	6481	19.10	7759
13	Silchar East	Moinul Hoque Choudhury	INC	23050	58.95	Jitendra Nath Chowdhury	IND	16048	41.05	7002
14	Sonai	Pulakeshi Singh	INC	16654	56.76	Jatindra Mohan Barbhuiya	IND	11685	39.83	4969
15	Lakhipur	Ram Prasad Choubey	INC	14916	58.53	Gour Singh	IND	5267	20.67	9649
16	Udharbond	Dwarika Nath Tewari	INC	16336	73.62	Anil Kumar Barman	PSP	5854	26.38	10482
17	North Cachar Hills (ST)	Joy Bhadra Hagjer	INC	5708	50.07	Mohan Hamdhan	APHLC	5693	49.93	15
18	Mikir Hills East (ST)	Sai Sai Terang	INC	7059	43.63	Barelong Terang	IND	4750	29.36	2309
19	Mikir Hills West (ST)	Chatrasing Teron	INC	10020	65.97	Basa Ingti Kathar	APHLC	5169	34.03	4851
20	Jowai (ST)	Enowell Pohshna	APHLC	10762	46.70	Kistobin Rymbai	IND	4537	19.69	6225
21	Nongpoh (ST)	B. B. Lyngdoh	APHLC	13076	73.47	Ajra Singh Khongphai	INC	2926	16.44	10150
22	Shillong	Wilson Reade	APHLC	10751	49.58	Aron Alley	INC	7754	35.76	2997
23	Nongstoin (ST)	Hopingstone Lyngdoh	APHLC	9825	67.41	Bhatiar Syiem	INC	2827	19.40	6998
24	Cherrapunji (ST)	Stanley D. D. Nichols Roy	APHLC	18786	70.87	Maham Singh	INC	7721	29.13	11065
25	Baghmara (ST)	Williamson A. Sangma	APHLC	7855	60.57	Dingmin Nengminza	INC	4796	36.98	3059
26	Dainadubi (ST)	Nallindra Sangma	APHLC	6238	69.40	Aaron Sangma	INC	2102	23.39	4136
27	Tura (ST)	Emerson Momin	APHLC	7979	55.32	Noho Sangma	INC	3750	26.00	4229
28	Phulbari (ST)	Emonsing M Sangma	INC	6104	51.06	Bronson Momin	APHLC	4340	36.31	1764
29	Mankachar	Zahirul Islam	IND	10744	49.47	Kobad Hussain Ahmed	INC	10492	48.31	252
30	South Salmara	Bazlul Basit	INC	17373	60.97	Maulvi Sahadat Ali Mandal	PSP	10341	36.29	7032
31	Dhubri	Md. Umaruddin	INC	10643	56.15	Tamizuddin Pradhani	IND	4515	23.82	6128
32	Golakganj	Sarat Chandra Sinha	INC	12591	44.65	Kabir Chandra Ray	IND	10374	36.79	2217
33	Gauripur	Syed Ahmmad Ali	INC	10150	34.03	Azad Ali	PSP	8132	27.26	2018
34	Bilasipara	Derajuddin Khan	INC	11583	40.74	Jahanuddin Khan	PSP	9307	32.74	2276
35	Gossalgaon	Mithius Tudu	IND	7350	31.51	Panchanan Medhi	INC	4532	19.43	2818
36	Sidli (ST)	Rupnath Brahma	INC	9625	58.68	Birendra Narayan Brahma Patgiri	IND	5702	34.76	3923
37	Kokrajhar	Raja Ajit Narayan Deb	INC	9508	44.99	Bipin Chandra Daimari	CPI	5929	28.05	3579
38	Bijni	Ram Prasad Das	PSP	8896	39.42	Hareswar Das	INC	7661	33.94	1235
39	North Salmara (SC)	Ghanasyam Das	INC	15505	56.84	Kandarpa Narayan Banikya	PSP	4927	18.06	10578
40	Goalpara	Khagendranath Nath	INC	17854	50.41	Abdul Rahim	PSP	10974	30.99	6880
41	Dudhnai (ST)	Hakim Chandra Rabha	INC	11469	49.66	Sarat Chandra Rabha	CPI	7798	33.78	3671
42	Boko	Prabin Kumar Chaudhuri	INC	12800	57.27	Kati Ram Rava	PSP	7912	35.40	4888
43	Rampur	Harendra Nath Talukdar	INC	14515	52.04	Hareswar Goswami	PSP	10837	38.85	3678
44	Palasbari	Radhika Ram Das	INC	12494	42.57	Govinda Kalita	IND	6625	22.57	5869
45	Gauhati	Debendra Nath Sarma	INC	14047	39.12	Gaurishankar Bhattacharyya	CPI	8560	23.84	5487
46	Kamalpur	Sarat Chandra Goswami	INC	14327	56.13	Abu Bakar Siddique	IND	4655	18.24	9672
47	Hajo	Mahendra Mohan Choudhry	INC	19038	54.04	Sheikh Chand Mohammad	IND	11700	33.21	7338
48	Tarabari	Tajuddin Ahmed	PSP	12681	43.40	Ataur Rahman	INC	11322	38.75	1359
49	Bhabanipur (SC)	Mahadeb Das	INC	8820	40.69	Anil Chandra	IND	5282	24.37	3538
50	Barpeta	Madhusudhan Das	PSP	18124	57.73	Maulavi Mokhtar Ali	INC	12345	39.32	5779
51	Jania	Fakhruddin Ali Ahmed	INC	25208	84.56	Mahiuddin	PSP	4603	15.44	20605
52	Sorbhog	Akshoy Kumar Das	INC	11338	41.40	Ghanashyam Talukdar	IND	10573	38.60	765
53	Barama (ST)	Surendra Nath Das	INC	9015	56.18	Birendra Kumar Das	PSP	4346	27.08	4669
54	Patacharkuchi	Homeswar Deb Choudhury	PSP	13407	56.89	Prasanna Chandra Pathak	INC	10161	43.11	3246
55	Nalbari West	Sriman Prafulla Goswami	INC	14429	49.81	Tarun Sen Deka	CPI	8763	29.87	5666
56	Nalbari East	Prabin Sarma	INC	7419	29.24	Hari Charan Pathak	IND	5358	21.12	2061
57	Rangiya	Siddhi Nath Sarma	INC	12416	68.89	Kamaleswar Buzar Baruah	IND	4246	23.56	8170
58	Tamalpur (ST)	Haladhar Uzir	PSP	8371	48.87	Baikuntha Nath Das	INC	7993	46.66	7993
59	Panery (ST)	Bahadur Basumatary	INC	14961	63.31	Balsing Baglari	IND	5800	24.54	9161
60	Kalaigaon	Dandi Ram Dutta	INC	17169	65.26	Hiralal Patowary	IND	8298	31.54	8871
61	Mangaldai	Sibaprasad Sarmah	INC	13448	51.54	Keshab Chandra Bhuyan	IND	12643	48.46	805
62	Dalgaon	Md. Matlebuddin	INC	16698	83.41	Samser Ali	IND	2794	13.96	13904
63	Dhekiajuli	Omeo Kumar Das	INC	15915	70.14	Purna Narayan Sinha	PSP	6776	29.86	9139
64	Barchalla	Mohi Kanta Das	INC	12731	51.51	Bharat Hazarika	IND	8019	32.45	4712
65	Balipara	Biswadev Sarma	INC	16012	60.41	Michael Lugun	IND	4314	16.27	11698
66	Tezpur	Kamala Prasad Agarwala	INC	10763	49.47	Golok Kakati	PSP	8784	40.37	1979
67	Biswanath	Kamakhya Prasad Tripathy	INC	20490	69.19	Cheni Ram Das	IND	6274	21.19	14216
68	Gohpur	Bishnulal Upadhyaya	INC	18231	61.29	Bharat Chandra Das	IND	6614	22.24	11617
69	Morigaon (ST)	Bali Ram Das	INC	12361	64.62	Pit Sing Konwar	PSP	5165	27.00	7196
70	Laharighat	Lakshmi Prasad Goswami	PSP	14141	53.45	Faizuddin Ahmed	INC	11114	42.01	3027
71	Dhing	Mohammad Idris	INC	18734	84.18	Samsul Huda	IND	3522	15.82	15212
72	Rupohihat	Abu Nasar Md. Ohid	INC	12670	71.44	Abdur Ruf	IND	2943	16.60	9727
73	Kaliabor	Lila Kanta Bora	INC	8465	42.00	Laduram Rathi	IND	6814	33.81	1651
74	Samaguri	D. K. Barooah	INC	12257	56.51	Liladhar Borkakaty	PSP	7855	36.22	4402
75	Nowgong	Moti Ram Bora	INC	25102	70.76	Phani Bora	CPI	9586	27.02	15516
76	Raha (SC)	Mahendra Nath Hazarika	INC	16921	61.34	Bali Ram Das	PSP	10663	38.66	6258
77	Jamunamukh	Begum Afia Ahmed	INC	14687	50.55	Phani Bora	ABJS	4770	16.42	9917
78	Lumding	Santi Ranjan Das Gupta	IND	18359	49.77	Ram Nath Sarma	INC	15882	43.05	2477
79	Marangi	Chanoo Kheria	INC	8672	63.02	Sankor Chandra Barua	PSP	2437	17.71	6235
80	Golaghat	Dandeswar Hazarika	INC	7136	36.68	Bedabrata Barua	PSP	4282	22.01	2854
81	Bokakhat	Narendranath Sarma	INC	9905	59.39	Sagar Chandra Bora	PSP	2733	16.39	7172
82	Dergaon (SC)	Ramnath Das	INC	7862	54.72	Moneswar Bharali	PSP	3968	27.62	3894
83	Titabar	Sarbeswar Bordoloi	INC	11736	44.96	Giridhar Thengal	CPI	8043	30.81	3693
84	Katonigaon	Komol Kumari Barua	INC	8112	35.62	P. M. Sarwan	IND	4835	21.23	3277
85	Jorhat	Dulal Chandra Baruah	IND	7848	30.04	Bangshidhar Dutta	PSP	7188	27.51	660
86	Majuli (ST)	Malchandra Pegu	INC	8917	44.37	Mohidhar Pegoo	IND	5177	25.76	3740
87	Teok	Tilok Gogoi	INC	9570	47.87	Sonaram Chutia	PSP	5329	26.66	4241
88	Amguri	Khagen Barbarua	RCPI	8798	42.80	Thanoram Gogoi	INC	7798	37.94	1000
89	Nazira	Tankeswar Chetia	INC	9957	45.88	Karuna Gogoi	PSP	8393	38.67	1564
90	Sonari	Bimala Prasad Chaliha	INC	10319	61.87	Sashidhar Phukan	PSP	2758	16.54	7561
91	Thowra	Durgeswar Saikia	INC	14875	54.79	Buddha Barua	RCPI	7574	27.90	7301
92	Sibsagar	Girindra Nath Gogoi	INC	12282	50.90	Promode Gogoi	CPI	7061	29.26	5221
93	Bihpuria	Mohananda Bora	INC	8152	33.97	Premadhar Bora	IND	5237	21.82	2915
94	North Lakhimpur (ST)	Lokhyanath Doley	INC	10633	47.18	Nameswar Pegu	CPI	9601	42.60	1032
95	Dhakuakhana (ST)	Lalit Kumar Doley	INC	10972	40.62	Lilaram Borsaikia	CPI	5692	21.07	5280
96	Moran	Padma Kumari Gohain	INC	9796	47.11	Madanchandra Barua	IND	5208	25.05	4588
97	Dibrugarh	Ramesh Chandra Barooah	INC	11588	57.51	Binoy Bhushan Chakravarty	CPI	6438	31.95	5150
98	Lahowal	Lily Sen Gupta	INC	6231	44.07	Nibaran Chandra Bora	IND	5567	39.38	664
99	Tengakhat	Manik Chandra Das	INC	7969	48.68	Jonaram Neog	SOC	3513	21.46	4456
100	Jaipur	Indreswar Khaund	INC	8361	48.44	Tholok Gogoy	SOC	5546	32.13	2815
101	Bogdung	Upendra Nath Santan	INC	8586	56.43	Golap Borbora	SOC	6628	43.57	1958
102	Tinsukia	Radhakishan Khemka	INC	15228	51.62	Barin Chowdhury	CPI	8353	28.31	6875
103	Digboi	Dwijesh Chandra Deb Sarma	INC	12417	46.73	Mohanlal Mukherjee	CPI	5437	20.46	6980
104	Doom Dooma	Malia Tanti	INC	13745	84.75	Vincen Bhengra	IND	2473	15.25	11272
105	Saikhowa	Devendra Nath Hazarika	INC	7777	54.67	Robin Moran	IND	3236	22.75	4541

== See also ==
- List of constituencies of the Assam Legislative Assembly
- 1962 elections in India
