= Hailakandi Assembly constituency =

Constituency of the Assam legislative assembly in India

Hailakandi
- Constituency No. 121 for the Assam Legislative Assembly
- 121-Hailakandi within Hailakandi district

Constituency details
- Country: India
- Region: Northeast India
- State: Assam
- Division: Barak Valley
- District: Hailakandi
- Lok Sabha constituency: Karimganj
- Established: 1951
- Total electors: 222,147 (2026)
- Reservation: None

Member of Legislative Assembly
- 16th Assam Legislative Assembly
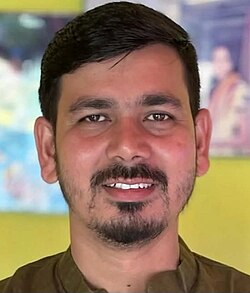
- Incumbent Dr. Milon Das
- Party: BJP
- Alliance: NDA
- Elected year: 2026
- Preceded by: Zakir Hussain Laskar (AIUDF)

Hailakandi Assembly constituency is one of the 126 state legislative assembly constituencies in Assam, India. It is one of the six assembly segments that constitute the Karimganj Lok Sabha constituency. Since 2026, it has been represented by Dr. Milon Das of the Bharatiya Janata Party.

Established in 1951, the constituency had its boundaries redrawn during the 2023 delimitation exercise. The reconstituted constituency now includes Hailakandi town, Lala town and many other rural areas of the Hailakandi district.

Most successful political parties from Hailakandi Assembly constituency since 1952
1. INC (7 times) (43.8%)
2. AIUDF (3 times) (18.8%)
3. IND (3 times) (18.8%)
4. BJP (2 times) (12.5%)
5. CPI(M) (1 time) (6.25%)

== Local self-governed segments ==
Hailakandi Assembly constituency is composed of the following local self-governed segments:

- Hailakandi Municipal Board
- Lala Municipal Board
- Algapur Development Block
  - Mohonpur-Burne Brease Gram Panchayat
  - Kalinagar Gram Panchayat
  - Mohonpur Gram Panchayat
  - Uttar-Narainpur Gram Panchayat
  - Uttar-Kachanpur Gram Panchayat
  - Bakrihawar Gram Panchayat
- Hailakandi Development Block
  - Matijuri-Paikan Gram Panchayat
  - Bahadurpur Gram Panchayat
  - Bashdahar-Bar-Hailakandi Gram Panchayat
  - Narainpur-Tupkhana Gram Panchayat
  - Rangauti Gram Panchayat
  - Sudarshanpur-Bandukmara Gram Panchayat
- Katlicherra Development Block
  - Katlicherra Gram Panchayat
  - Rangabak Gram Panchayat
  - Sunacherra-Rupacherra Gram Panchayat
  - Dinanathpur Gram Panchayat
  - Harishnagar Gram Panchayat
- Lala Development Block
  - Dhalcherra-Bilaipur Gram Panchayat
  - Lalacherra-Vernerpur Gram Panchayat
  - Lalamukh Gram Panchayat
  - Rajyeswarpur Gram Panchayat
  - Sudarshanpur-Kalacherra Gram Panchayat
  - Chandrapur Gram Panchayat
  - Jyotsnabad-Umednagar Gram Panchayat
  - Nimaichandpur Gram Panchayat
  - Niz-vernerpur-Sarbanandapur Gram Panchayat
  - Purbo-Kittarbond-Rajyeswarpur Gram Panchayat
  - Tantoo-Dhanipur Gram Panchayat
  - Monacherra Gram Panchayat
  - Aenakhal Gram Panchayat
  - Koyah-Ramchandi Gram Panchayat
- South Hailakandi Development Block
  - Baruncherra-Kukicherra Gram Panchayat
  - Dhalai Bagan Gram Panchayat
  - Baldabaldi-Nandagram Gram Panchayat
  - Dariarghat-Karicherra Gram Panchayat
  - Gharmurah-Bagcherra Gram Panchayat
  - Jamira Gram Panchayat
  - Killarbak-Jalnacherra Gram Panchayat
  - Monipur-Niskar Gram Panchayat
  - Paloicherra-Sultanicherra Gram Panchayat
- Katigorah Development Block
  - Dudhpur Gram Panchayat
  - Phulbari Gram Panchayat

== Members of the Legislative Assembly ==
Following is the list of members representing Hailakandi Assembly constituency in Assam Legislature:

Election	Member	Political Party
2026	Dr. Milon Das	Bharatiya Janata Party
2021	Zakir Hussain Laskar	All India United Democratic Front
2016	Anwar Hussain Laskar	All India United Democratic Front
2011	Abdul Muhib Mazumder	Indian National Congress
2006	Hazi Salim Uddin Barbhuiya	All India United Democratic Front
2001	Sahab Uddin Choudhury	Independent politician
1996	Abdul Muhib Mazumder	Independent politician
1991	Chittendra Nath Mazumder	Bharatiya Janata Party
1985	Abdul Muhib Mazumder	Indian National Congress
1983	Abdul Muhib Mazumder	Indian National Congress
1978	Dipak Bhattacharjee	Communist Party of India
1972	Abdur Rahman Chowdhury	Indian National Congress
1967	Abdul Matlib Mazumder	Indian National Congress
1962	Rampirit Rudrapaul	Independent politician
1957	Abdul Matlib Mazumder	Indian National Congress
1952	Abdul Matlib Mazumder	Indian National Congress

== Election results ==
Vote share of Winning candidates
2026	63.57%
2021	55.07%
2016	36.86%
2011	37.87%
2006	44.60%
2001	42.15%
1996	63.08%
1991	39.67%
1985	52.05%
1983	46.49%
1978	28.15%
1972	59.85%
1967	69.83%
1962	44.52%
1957	51.93%
1952	55.93%

=== 2026 ===
2026 Assam Legislative Assembly election: Hailakandi
Party	Candidate	Votes	%	±%
BJP	Dr. Milon Das	119,591	63.57	▲26.91
INC	Rahul Roy	63,774	33.90	New entry
NOTA	None of the above	1,708	0.91	▲0.09
Margin of victory		55,817	29.67	▲11.26
Turnout		1,88,328	84.78	▲5.86
Registered electors		222,147		▲35.87
BJP gain from AIUDF		Swing	▲40.99	

=== 2021 ===
2021 Assam Legislative Assembly election: Hailakandi
Party	Candidate	Votes	%	±%
AIUDF	Zakir Hussain Laskar	71,057	55.07	▲18.21
BJP	Dr. Milon Das	47,303	36.66	▲2.11
Independent	Hilal Uddin Laskar	6,583	5.10	New entry
NOTA	None of the above	1,063	0.82	▲0.57
Margin of victory		23,754	18.41	▲16.10
Turnout		129,031	78.92	▲1.03
Registered electors		163,505		▲12.71
AIUDF hold		Swing		

=== 2016 ===
2016 Assam Legislative Assembly election: Hailakandi
Party	Candidate	Votes	%	±%
AIUDF	Anwar Hussain Laskar	41,647	36.86	▲17.14
BJP	Soumyajit Dutta Choudhury	39,039	34.55	▲2.41
Independent	Zakir Hussain Laskar	15,633	13.84	New entry
INC	Anam Uddin Laskar	9,287	8.22	▼29.65
NOTA	None of the above	281	0.25	New entry
Margin of victory		2,608	2.31	▼3.41
Turnout		112,995	77.89	▲11.52
Registered electors		145,069		▲10.08
AIUDF gain from INC		Swing	▲23.39	

=== 2011 ===
2011 Assam Legislative Assembly election: Hailakandi
Party	Candidate	Votes	%	±%
INC	Abdul Muhib Mazumder	33,038	37.87	▲18.55
BJP	Subrata Kumar Nath	28,045	32.14	▲8.65
AIUDF	Hazi Salim Uddin Barbhuiya	17,208	19.72	▼24.88
Margin of victory		4,993	5.72	▼15.40
Turnout		87,464	66.37	▲2.91
Registered electors		131,786		▲5.36
INC gain from AIUDF		Swing	▲21.71	

=== 2006 ===
2006 Assam Legislative Assembly election: Hailakandi
Party	Candidate	Votes	%	±%
AIUDF	Hazi Salim Uddin Barbhuiya	35,378	44.60	New entry
BJP	Mrityunjoy Chakravorty	18,629	23.49	New entry
INC	Abdul Muhib Mazumder	15,325	19.32	▲16.43
AGP	Jalanta Sengupta	2,232	2.81	▼3.50
Margin of victory		16,749	21.12	▲10.68
Turnout		79,379	63.46	▼18.46
Registered electors		125,078		▲15.96
AIUDF gain from Independent		Swing	▲43.37	

=== 2001 ===
2001 Assam Legislative Assembly election: Hailakandi
Party	Candidate	Votes	%	±%
Independent	Sahab Uddin Choudhury	35,629	42.15	New entry
Independent	Mrityunjoy Chakravorty	26,805	31.71	New entry
Independent	Hazi Salim Uddin Barbhuiya	6,658	7.88	New entry
AGP	Jalanta Sengupta	5,334	6.31	New entry
SP	Abdul Muhib Mazumder	3,779	4.47	New entry
INC	Hilal Uddin Laskar	2,442	2.89	▲0.62
Margin of victory		8,824	10.44	▼24.24
Turnout		88,360	81.92	▼6.89
Registered electors		107,860		▲5.26
Independent hold		Swing	▲52.61	

=== 1996 ===
1996 Assam Legislative Assembly election: Hailakandi
Party	Candidate	Votes	%	±%
Independent	Abdul Muhib Mazumder	55,873	63.08	New entry
BJP	Chittendra Nath Mazumder	25,161	28.41	▼11.26
INC	Sahab Uddin Choudhury	3,111	3.51	▼0.25
Margin of victory		30,712	34.68	▲16.74
Turnout		91,002	88.81	▲9.24
Registered electors		102,468		▲7.31
Independent gain from BJP		Swing	▲37.17	

=== 1991 ===
1991 Assam Legislative Assembly election: Hailakandi
Party	Candidate	Votes	%	±%
BJP	Chittendra Nath Mazumder	28,775	39.67	New entry
JP	Sahab Uddin Choudhury	15,761	21.73	New entry
Independent	Hazi Tazamul Ali Laskar	11,145	15.37	New entry
Independent	Hilal Uddin Mazumder	4,945	6.82	New entry
AGP	Rabindra Singha	3,608	4.97	New entry
INC	Abdul Muhib Mazumder	2,724	3.76	▼48.29
Margin of victory		13,014	17.94	▼12.64
Turnout		75,983	79.57	▲8.77
Registered electors		95,489		▲17.48
BJP gain from INC		Swing	▲43.98	

=== 1985 ===
1985 Assam Legislative Assembly election: Hailakandi
Party	Candidate	Votes	%	±%
INC	Abdul Muhib Mazumder	27,969	52.05	▲5.56
CPI(M)	Abdul Khaleque Laskar	11,535	21.47	▲12.70
Independent	Kula Chandra Singha	7,748	14.42	New entry
Independent	Nazarul Haque Mazarbhuiya	2,807	5.22	New entry
Margin of victory		16,434	30.58	▲21.41
Turnout		57,551	70.80	▲5.06
Registered electors		81,284		▲11.99
INC hold		Swing		

=== 1983 ===
1983 Assam Legislative Assembly election: Hailakandi
Party	Candidate	Votes	%	±%
INC	Abdul Muhib Mazumder	21,666	46.49	▲32.48
Independent	Gautam Roy	17,390	37.31	New entry
CPI(M)	Dipak Bhattacharjee	4,086	8.77	▼19.38
IC(S)	Makram Ali Laskar	2,642	5.67	New entry
Margin of victory		4,276	9.17	▼1.32
Turnout		47,711	65.74	▲7.93
Registered electors		72,578		▲8.05
INC gain from CPI(M)		Swing	▲25.93	

=== 1978 ===
1978 Assam Legislative Assembly election: Hailakandi
Party	Candidate	Votes	%	±%
CPI(M)	Dipak Bhattacharjee	10,745	28.15	▲17.33
Independent	Abdul Muhib Mazumder	6,740	17.66	New entry
INC	Santosh Kumar Roy	5,350	14.01	▼45.84
JP	Desh Ranjan Nath	3,900	10.22	New entry
INC(I)	Abdur Rahman Chowdhury	3,470	9.09	New entry
Independent	Abdul Rahman Mazumder	2,316	6.07	New entry
Independent	Dhabal Singha	2,076	5.44	New entry
Independent	Khairun Nessa Choudhury	2,059	5.39	New entry
Margin of victory		4,005	10.49	▼35.83
Turnout		38,833	57.81	▼4.48
Registered electors		67,170		▲7.18
CPI(M) gain from INC		Swing	▲31.58	

=== 1972 ===
1972 Assam Legislative Assembly election: Hailakandi
Party	Candidate	Votes	%	±%
INC	Abdur Rahman Chowdhury	22,610	59.85	▼9.98
Independent	Dinesh Chandra Sinha	5,111	13.53	New entry
CPI(M)	Abdul Ahad Mazumder	4,089	10.82	▼5.20
Independent	Rampirit Rudrapaul	2,770	7.33	New entry
Margin of victory		17,499	46.32	▼7.49
Turnout		39,039	62.29	▲4.81
Registered electors		62,672		▲8.51
INC hold		Swing		

=== 1967 ===
1967 Assam Legislative Assembly election: Hailakandi
Party	Candidate	Votes	%	±%
INC	Abdul Matlib Mazumder	22,023	69.83	▲35.77
CPI(M)	A.K. Laskar	5,053	16.02	New entry
Independent	I.K. Singha	4,461	14.15	New entry
Margin of victory		16,970	53.81	▲43.35
Turnout		33,201	57.48	▲1.26
Registered electors		57,759		▲20.49
INC gain from Independent		Swing	▲40.14	

=== 1962 ===
1962 Assam Legislative Assembly election: Hailakandi
Party	Candidate	Votes	%	±%
Independent	Rampirit Rudrapaul	11,681	44.52	▲5.32
INC	Abdul Matlib Mazumder	8,937	34.06	▼17.87
Independent	Mahmud Ali Barbhuiya	5,618	21.41	New entry
Margin of victory		2,744	10.46	▼2.27
Turnout		26,951	56.22	▲0.90
Registered electors		47,937		▲8.38
Independent gain from INC		Swing	▲11.59	

=== 1957 ===
1957 Assam Legislative Assembly election: Hailakandi
Party	Candidate	Votes	%	±%
INC	Abdul Matlib Mazumder	12,705	51.93	▼4.00
Independent	Rampirit Rudrapaul	9,591	39.20	New entry
PSP	Mantaj Ali Laskar	2,170	8.87	New entry
Margin of victory		3,114	12.73	▼26.24
Turnout		24,466	55.32	▲1.23
Registered electors		44,230		▲6.81
INC hold		Swing		

=== 1952 ===
1952 Assam Legislative Assembly election: Hailakandi
Party	Candidate	Votes	%	±%
INC	Abdul Matlib Mazumder	12,527	55.93	New entry
KMPP	Mantaz Ali	3,799	16.96	New entry
Independent	Suresh Chandra Pal	2,575	11.50	New entry
Margin of victory		8,728	38.97	——
Turnout		22,397	54.09	——
Registered electors		41,409		——
INC win (new seat)				

== See also ==
- Silchar Assembly constituency
- Lumding Assembly constituency
- Hojai Assembly constituency
- Katigorah Assembly constituency
- Ram Krishna Nagar Assembly constituency
- Bijni Assembly constituency
- Patharkandi Assembly constituency
- Borkhola Assembly constituency
- Dholai Assembly constituency
