= Sahab Uddin Choudhury =

Indian politician

Member of the Assam Legislative Assembly
- In office 13 May 2001 – 11 May 2006
- Preceded by: Abdul Muhib Mazumder
- Succeeded by: Hazi Salim Uddin Barbhuiya
- Constituency: Hailakandi

Personal details
- Party: Independent

Sahab Uddin Choudhury is an Indian politician who was elected to the Assam Legislative Assembly from Hailakandi in the 2001 Assam Legislative Assembly election as an independent candidate.
