= Milon Das =

Indian politician (born 1991)

- মিলন দাস
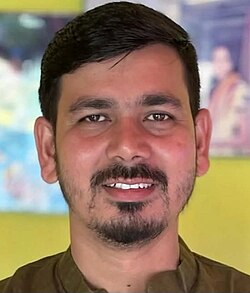
- Milon Das

Member of the Assam Legislative Assembly
- Incumbent
- Assumed office 2026
- Preceded by: Zakir Hussain Laskar
- Constituency: Hailakandi

Personal details
- Born: February 27, 1991 (age 35) Hailakandi, Assam, India
- Party: Bharatiya Janata Party
- Parent: Nripendra Das (father)
- Education: M.Sc, Ph.D
- Alma mater: PM SHRI Charlmers HS School, Katlicherra, Srikishan Sarda College, Hailakandi, Assam University, Silchar
- Occupation: Politician
- Profession: Academic, Private Tutor

Milon Das (born 27 February 1991) is an Indian politician from Assam. He is a member of the Assam Legislative Assembly from the Hailakandi Assembly constituency in Hailakandi district representing the Bharatiya Janata Party. He is also the State Vice-President of the Bharatiya Janata Yuva Morcha of Assam.

== Early life ==
Milon Das is from Katlicherra, Hailakandi, Assam. He is the son of Nripendra Das. He completed his matriculation from PM SHRI Charlmers Higher Secondary School, Katlicherra, HS & B.Sc in Botany from the Srikishan Sarda College, Hailakandi, M.Sc & Ph.D from Assam University, Silchar.

== Career ==
Das was the President of the Assam University Students Union. He joined Bharatiya Janata Party in 2021 and contested the 2021 Assam Legislative Assembly election but he lost to All India United Democratic Front candidate Zakir Hussain Laskar. In 2026, he won the Hailakandi Assembly constituency representing the Bharatiya Janata Party in the 2026 Assam Legislative Assembly election. He polled 1,19,591 votes and defeated his nearest rival, Rahul Roy of the Indian National Congress, by a margin of 55,817 votes.
