= Dipak Bhattacharjee =

Indian politician (died 2019)

MLA of Hailakandi Vidhan Sabha Constituency
- In office 1978–1983
- Preceded by: Abdur Rahman Chowdhury
- Succeeded by: Abdul Muhib Mazumder

Personal details
- Born: 1939/40
- Died: 29 January 2019
- Party: Communist Party of India (Marxist)

Dipak Bhattacharjee was an Indian politician from the state of Assam. He was elected as MLA of Hailakandi Vidhan Sabha Constituency in Assam Legislative Assembly in 1978. He died on 29 January 2019 at the age of 79.
