= Abdur Rahman Chowdhury =

Abdur Rahman Chowdhury may refer to:

- Abdur Rahman Chowdhury (politician)
- Abdur Rahman Chowdhury (justice)
