= Nurul Haque Choudhury =

Indian politician

Member of the Assam Legislative Assembly
- In office 1972–1978
- Preceded by: Moinul Hoque Choudhury
- Succeeded by: Altaf Hossain Mazumdar
- Constituency: Sonai
- In office 1983–1985
- Preceded by: Altaf Hossain Mazumdar
- Succeeded by: Abdul Rob Laskar
- Constituency: Sonai

Personal details
- Party: Indian National Congress

Nurul Haque Choudhury is an Indian politician from Assam. He was elected to the Assam Legislative Assembly from Sonai constituency in the 1972 and 1983 elections as a member of the Indian National Congress.
