= Karim Uddin Barbhuiya =

Indian politician

Member of Assam Legislative Assembly
- Incumbent
- Assumed office 21 May 2021
- Preceded by: Aminul Haque Laskar
- Constituency: Sonai

General Secretary (Political Affairs) of All India United Democratic Front Central Committee
- In office 15 November 2016 – 12 June 2024
- Preceded by: Post Established

Personal details
- Born: circa 1970 (age 55–56) Kanakpur, Cachar district, Assam India
- Party: Asom Gana Parishad (2026-Present)
- Other party: All India United Democratic Front (2011 2026)
- Children: 2
- Parent: Late Rahim Uddin Barbhuiya (father)
- Education: Graduated

Karim Uddin Barbhuiya (Bengali: করিম উদ্দিন বড়ভুঁইয়া), also known by his daak naam Saju (Bengali: সাজু), is an Indian politician from Asom Gana Parishad politician and businessman from Assam, India. He was a member of General Secretary (Political Affairs) of All India United Democratic Front Central Committee from 2016 to 2024. when he resigned from the party membership in 05 MARCH 2026. He has been serving as a Member of Assam Legislative Assembly for Sonai since 2021.

== Early life and family ==
Karim Uddin Barbhuiya was born into a Bengali Muslim family from Kanakpur, Cachar district, Assam. His father, Rahim Uddin Barbhuiya, was supposedly the descendant of a Mirashdar (Note: Mirashdar is a term referring to a landowner who pays taxes directly to the government.) that was endowed the title of Barbhuiya by the erstwhile Raja of Kachar for paying a fee of 50 monetary units.

In 2019, Barbhuiya graduated from the Chaudhary Charan Singh University in Meerut with a Bachelor of Arts degree.

== Career ==
Barbhuiya is the general secretary of the All India United Democratic Front's central committee and is also the head of the party's Barpeta branch. During 2016 Assam Legislative Assembly elections he contested unsuccessfully against Aminul Haque Laskar but in 2021 Assam Legislative Assembly elections, he defeated Aminul Haque Laskar by a margin of 19,654 votes and was elected into the Assam Legislative Assembly.

On 5 March 2026, Barbhuiya was suspended from the AIUDF for 6 years for supporting the National Democratic Alliance's slate of candidates for the 2026 Rajya Sabha elections.
