= Chittendra Nath Mazumder =

Indian politician

Chittendra Nath Mazumder is a Bharatiya Janata Party politician from Assam, India. He was elected to the Assam Legislative Assembly in 1991 from Hailakandi constituency.
