= Channighat =

- Town
- Location within India
- Coordinates: 24.51572°N 92.82222°E
- Country: India
- State: Assam
- District: Cachar
- Block: Narsingpur

Population (2015)
  - Total: 10,000
- Time zone: UTC+5:30 (IST)
- Pin: 788120
- Silchar: 03842
- ISO 3166 code: IN-AS

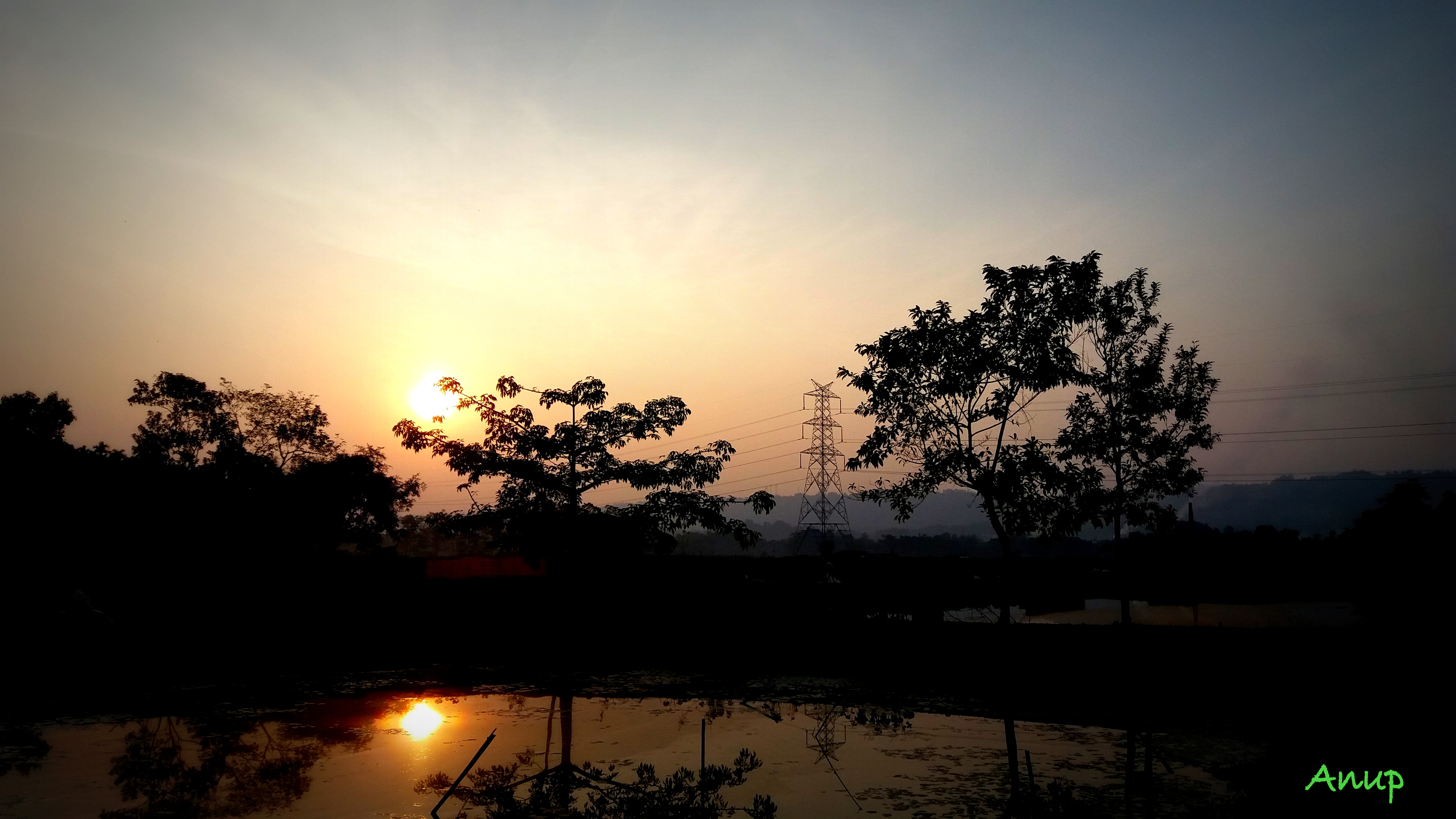
Channighat Sunset

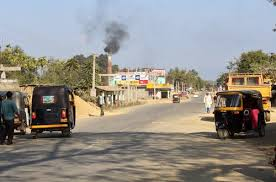

Channighat is a village panchayat in Narsingpur Tehsil in Cachar district of Assam State, India. It is located 39 km (24 mi) south of Silchar, 31 km (19 mi) from Narsingpur and 245 km (152 mi) from the state capital at Dispur.

Bengali and Meitei (Manipuri) are the official languages of this place.

The surrounding nearby villages and its distance from Channighat are Narsingpur, Bhagabazar, Chandpur, Cleverhouse, Derby, Dholai, Jamalpur, Jibangram, Kajidahar, Nagdirgram, Panibhora, Puthikhal, Rajnagar, Saptagram, and Shawrertal.

== Education ==
- Channighat M.V School
- Dr. Br Ambedkar Memorial High School
- Bam Bidya Pith High School

== Neighbourhood ==
- Bhaga Bazar
- Vairengte
- Lailapur
- Dholai
- Silchar

== Neighbouring villages ==
- Narsingpur
- Chandpur
- Cleverhouse
- Derby
- Jamalpur
- Jibangram
- Kajidahar
- Nagdirgram
- Panibhora
- Puthikhal
- Rajnagar
- Saptagram
- Shawrertal

== Connectivity ==
There is no railway station near Channighat within 35 km. However, Silchar Railway Station, a major railway station is 38 km from Channighat
