= Abdur Rahman Chowdhury (politician) =

Indian politician

Member of the Assam Legislative Assembly
- In office 1972–1978
- Preceded by: Abdul Matlib Mazumdar
- Succeeded by: Dipak Bhattacharjee
- Constituency: Hailakandi

Personal details
- Party: Indian National Congress

Abdur Rahman Chowdhury is an Indian politician. He was elected to the Assam Legislative Assembly from Hailakandi constituency in the 1972 Assam Legislative Assembly election as a member of the Indian National Congress.
