= Abdul Rob Laskar =

Indian politician

Member of the Assam Legislative Assembly
- In office 1985–1991
- Preceded by: Nurul Haque Choudhury
- Succeeded by: Badrinarayan Singh
- Constituency: Sonai

Personal details
- Party: Indian National Congress

Abdul Rob Laskar is an Indian politician and former legislator. He was elected to the Assam Legislative Assembly from Sonai constituency in the 1985 Assam Legislative Assembly election as a member of the Indian National Congress.
