= Anamul Haque Laskar =

Indian politician

Member of the Assam Legislative Assembly
- In office 2011–2016
- Preceded by: Kutub Ahmed Mazumder
- Succeeded by: Aminul Haque Laskar
- Constituency: Sonai

Personal details
- Party: Indian National Congress

Anamul Haque Laskar is an Indian politician who was elected to the Assam Legislative Assembly from Sonai constituency in the 2011 Assam Legislative Assembly election as a member of the Indian National Congress. Laskar failed to retain the seat in the 2016 elections.
