= Zakir Hussain Laskar =

Indian politician

Member of Assam Legislative Assembly
- Incumbent
- Assumed office 21 May 2021
- Preceded by: Anwar Hussain Laskar
- Constituency: Hailakandi

Personal details
- Party: All India United Democratic Front

Zakir Hussain Laskar is an All India United Democratic Front politician from Assam, India. He was elected to the Assam Legislative Assembly from Hailakandi in the 2021 Assam Legislative Assembly election.

On 5 March 2026, Lakar was suspended from the AIUDF for 6 years for supporting the National Democratic Alliance's slate of candidates for the 2026 Rajya Sabha elections.
