= Kutub Ahmed Mazumder =

Indian teacher and politician (c.1939–2019)

Assam Legislative Assembly
- In office 2006–2011
- Preceded by: Anwar Hussain Laskar
- Succeeded by: Anamul Haque Laskar
- Constituency: Sonai

Personal details
- Born: c. 1939
- Died: 27 November 2019 (aged 80)
- Party: Indian National Congress
- Occupation: Teacher, politician

Kutub Ahmed Mazumder (c. 1939 – 27 November 2019) was an Indian teacher and politician from Assam belonging to Indian National Congress. He was a member of the Assam Legislative Assembly.

== Biography ==
Mazumder was a Manipuri Muslim. He graduated from Gurucharan College in 1961. He was elected as a member of the Assam Legislative Assembly from Sonai in 2006 as an Indian National Congress candidate. Later, he quit the party and joined All India United Democratic Front. He contested from Silchar in the 2014 Indian general election but did not win. Later, he rejoined Indian National Congress.

Mazumder died of cardiac arrest on 27 November 2019 at the age of 80.
