= Sonai Assembly constituency =

Sonai
- Constituency No. 119 for the Assam Legislative Assembly

Constituency details
- Country: India
- Region: Northeast India
- State: Assam
- District: Cachar
- Lok Sabha constituency: Silchar
- Established: 1951
- Reservation: None

Member of Legislative Assembly
- 16th Assam Legislative Assembly
- Incumbent Aminul Haque Laskar
- Party: Indian National Congress
- Alliance: Asom Sonmilito Morcha
- Elected year: 2026
- Preceded by: Karim Uddin Barbhuiya

Sonai Assembly constituency is one of the 126 state legislative assembly constituencies in Assam state in North Eastern India. It is also one of 7 state legislative assembly constituencies included in the Silchar Lok Sabha constituency.

== Overview ==
As per the orders of the Delimitation Commission, No. 10 Sonai Assembly constituency is composed of the following: Sonai thana [excluding circle Nos. 32 (Part), 65, 66, Boaligrant in circle No. 54 (Part) and Hill Punjee and forest villages] and circle Nos. 28 to 31 and 35 in Silchar thana and circle No. 58 (Part) in Dholai thana in Silchar sub-division.

== Members of Legislative Assembly ==
Year	Winner	Party
1952	Nanda Kishore Sinha	Indian National Congress
1957	Nanda Kishore Sinha	Indian National Congress
1962	Pulakeshi Singh	Indian National Congress
1967	Moinul Hoque Choudhury	Indian National Congress
1972	Nurul Haque Choudhury	Indian National Congress
1983	Nurul Haque Choudhury	Indian National Congress
1978	Altaf Hossain Mazumdar	Janata Party
1985	Abdul Rob Laskar	Indian National Congress
1991	Badrinarayan Singh	Bharatiya Janata Party
1996	Anwar Hussain Laskar	Asom Gana Parishad
2001	Anwar Hussain Laskar	Samajwadi Party
2006	Kutub Ahmed Mazumder	Indian National Congress
2011	Anamul Haque Laskar	Indian National Congress
2016	Aminul Haque Laskar	Bharatiya Janata Party
2021	Karim Uddin Barbhuiya	All India United Democratic Front
2026	Aminul Haque Laskar	Indian National Congress

== Election results ==
=== 2026 ===
2026 Assam Legislative Assembly election: Sonai
Party	Candidate	Votes	%	±%
INC	Aminul Haque Laskar	89,957	56.05	N/A
AGP	Karim Uddin Barbhuiya	62,787	39.12	N/A
AIUDF	Minar Hussain	1,178	0.73	−48.10
AITC	Shahajahan Laskar	2,280	1.42	−0.48
NOTA	NOTA	1,562	0.97	+0.15
Margin of victory		27,170	16.93	+3.59
Turnout		160,491	81.73	+1.85
Rejected ballots				
Registered electors				
INC gain from AIUDF		Swing	+7.22	

=== 2021 ===
2021 Assam Legislative Assembly election: Sonai
Party	Candidate	Votes	%	±%
AIUDF	Karim Uddin Barbhuiya	71,937	48.83	+22.78
BJP	Aminul Haque Laskar	52,283	35.49	−0.34
Independent	Asish Halder	14,500	9.84	New
AITC	M. Shanti Kumar Singha	2,796	1.90	N/A
NOTA	None of the Above	1231	0.84	−0.21
SP	Anwar Hussain Laskar	469	0.32	N/A
SUCI(C)	Anjan Kumar Chanda	244	0.17	
Majority		19,654	13.34	+7.21
Turnout		1,47,344	79.88	+1.90
AIUDF gain from BJP		Swing	+12.94	

=== 2016 ===
Assam Legislative Assembly Election, 2016: Sonai
Party	Candidate	Votes	%	±%
BJP	Aminul Haque Laskar	44,236	35.89	
INC	Anamul Haque	36,683	29.76	
AIUDF	Karim Uddin Barbhuiya	32,109	26.05	
Independent	Ibungobi Singha	2,987	2.42	
Independent	Anwar Hussain Laskar	2,408	1.95	
Independent	Sanjib Kumar Das	943	0.77	
Independent	Santosh Das	598	0.49	
Independent	Rejaul Islam Barbhuiya	579	0.47	
LJP	Pranesh Nath	522	0.42	
SP	Manindra Chandra Das	401	0.33	
Independent	Jawaharlal Goala	401	0.33	
Independent	Maksus Ahmed Laskar	306	0.25	
NOTA	None of the Above	1292	1.05	
Majority		7,553	6.13	
Turnout		1,23,261	77.98	
BJP gain from INC		Swing		

== See also ==
- Sonai
- Cachar District
- Silchar
