= Pulakeshi Singh =

Indian politician

Member of the Assam Legislative Assembly
- In office 1962–1967
- Preceded by: Nanda Kishore Sinha
- Succeeded by: Moinul Hoque Choudhury
- Constituency: Sonai

Personal details
- Party: Indian National Congress

Pulakeshi Singh is an Indian politician and former MLA from Assam. He was elected to the Assam Legislative Assembly from Sonai constituency in the 1962 election as a member of the Indian National Congress.
