= Dholai =

- Village
- Location in Assam, India Dholai (India)
- Coordinates: 24°35′44.7972″N 92°50′47.8572″E
- Country: India
- State: Assam
- District: Cachar
- Block: Narsingpur

Population (2015)
  - Total: 10,000
- Time zone: UTC+5:30 (IST)
- Postal code: 788114
- Area code: 03842
- ISO 3166 code: IN-AS

Dholai is a village in Narsingpur Tehsil in Cachar District of Assam State, India. It is located 30 km towards South from District headquarters Silchar. 22 km from Narsingpur

== About Dholai ==
Dholai is a village in Narsingpur Tehsil in Cachar District of Assam State, India. It is located 30 km towards South from District headquarters Silchar. 22 km from Narsingpur. 235 km from State capital Dispur Dholai Pin code is 788114 and postal head office is Dholai Bazar.

== Geography ==
Dholai is located at 24° 35' 44.7972 N and 92° 50' 47.8572 E. It has an average elevation of 26 metres (85.3018 feet).

== Demographics ==
The population of Dholai village approximately 10,000.

== Languages ==
Bengali and Meitei (Manipuri) are the official languages of this place. Sylheti is the local language here.

== Education ==
- Bam Nityananda Multi Purpose H.s School
- Ideal English School
- Rajendra Roy Memorial Junior College

== Neighbourhood ==
- Bhaga Bazar
- Vairengte
- Lailapur
- Channighat
- Silchar

== Neighbouring villages ==
- Banskhal
- Mahadebpur
- Narsingpur
- Channighat
- Chandpur
- Cleverhouse
- Derby
- Jamalpur
- Jibangram
- Kajidahar
- Nagdirgram
- Panibhora
- Puthikhal
- Rajnagar
- Saptagram
- Shawrertal

== Connectivity ==
There is no railway station near Dholai within 30 km. However, Silchar Railway Station, a major railway station is 35 km from Dholai. NH 54 connects Silchar to Dholai en- route to Aizawl; vehicles regularly ply between Silchar to Dholai during Daytime.

== See also ==
- Silchar
- Dholai
- Sonai
