= Ali brothers =

The phrase the Ali brothers, in Indian history, refers to the two brothers who worked in the Indian independence movement. The brothers were:

- Shaukat Ali (politician) (1873–1938)
- Mohammad Ali Jauhar (1878–1931)
