= Abdul Matlib Mazumdar =

Indian politician

Abdul Matlib Mazumder

Member of the Assam Legislative Assembly
- In office 1946–1962
- Preceded by: Muzarrof Ali Laskar
- Succeeded by: Rampirit Rudrapaul
- Constituency: Hailakandi
- In office 1967–1972
- Preceded by: Rampirit Rudrapaul
- Succeeded by: Abdur Rahman Chowdhury
- Constituency: Hailakandi

Personal details
- Born: 1 June 1890 Ujankupa, Assam, British India
- Died: 4 July 1980 (aged 90)
- Party: Indian National Congress
- Children: Abdul Muhib Mazumder
- Education: University of Dhaka

Abdul Matlib Mazumder (1890–1980) was an Indian freedom fighter and political leader based in undivided Assam State. In 1946, when India was still under British rule, he became an MLA and Cabinet Minister of Assam. He was one of the prominent Muslim leaders of eastern India to support Hindu-Muslim unity, opposing the partition of India on communal lines. Mazumder along with Fakhruddin Ali Ahmed (who later became the 5th President of India) became the most prominent Muslim opponents of the demand for a separate Muslim state of Pakistan, especially in the eastern part of the country.

== Early life ==
Abdul Matlib Mazumdar was born into a Bengali Muslim family in Ujankupa (near Borjurai) village near Hailakandi in southern Assam. Orthodoxy among Muslims of that time could not prevent him from pursuing his studies. He used to swim across a river daily on the way to school. He was awarded 'Earle Medal' for academic excellence in 1915. Mazumdar took Master of Arts Degree in English literature from Dhaka University in 1921 and B.L. from Calcutta in 1924. He started legal practice at Hailakandi Bar in 1925. He rose to prominence as a lawyer. The then government offered him the post of magistrate, which he refused. He was well versed in religion and philosophy. He was a very good rider and was a member of Dacca Riders' Club. Shikar and farming were his hobbies. After the untimely death of his first wife, Mazumder married Samsunnahar Mazumder of Janirgool, Monachara around 1930–31. She died at Guwahati in her eldest daughter Hena Mazumder's house in 1989.

== Indian Independence Movement ==
In the early 1920s, he was at the forefront of the Khilafat Movement as a student at Dhaka. It was during that time that he came into contact with top other Indian leaders such as Ali brothers and became an ardent supporter of Mahatma Gandhi's ideas. He joined the Indian National Congress in 1925. He founded the Hailakandi Congress Committee in 1937 and became its first President. Netaji Subhas Chandra Bose and Pandit Jawaharlal Nehru visited Hailakandi in 1939 and 1945 respectively at the invitation of Mazumdar to strengthen the freedom movement as well as the Congress party in southern Assam. After the meeting Netaji visited Mazumder's house for a cup of tea. It was Netaji who initiated establishment of contact between Abul Kalam Azad and Matlib Mazumdar for gearing up nationalist Muslims against a growing Muslim League in the region. When Netaji was the President of the Congress, Maulana Abul Kalam Azad was the General Secretary. Netaji had instructed Maulana Azad during latter’s visit to Shillong to contact Matlib Mazumder, in his words, “You will find one Abdul Matlib Mazumder hailing from Hailakadi in the district of Cachar who may help you”. Once in Shillong, Maulana Azad contacted Sri Matlib Mazumder and discussed about the ouster of the Ministry headed by Sir Syed Mohd. Saadullah. Mazumdar became the first Chairman of Hailakandi township in 1939 and in 1945 he became the first Indian Chairman of the Hailakandi Local Board, a post always held by the European tea planters.

The Muslim League proved its might in the Muslim-dominated areas of India in 1937 elections. To counter the rising popularity of Muslim League, he successfully organised the Jamiat Ulema-e-Hind movement in Assam. Jamiat was an ally of the Congress having a mass following among the nationalist Muslims. In the very crucial 1946 General Elections just on the eve of India's independence, he wrested the Muslim majority Hailakandi seat from the hold of Muslim League. That victory virtually sealed the hopes and aspirations of the Muslim League to include southern Assam in Pakistan. It may be mentioned here that in that election, the bulk of the Muslim nominees of the Indian National Congress including Fakhruddin Ali Ahmed (5th President of India in later years) had lost to their Muslim League rivals miserably.

Assam's Surma Valley (now partly in Bangladesh) had Muslim-majority population. On the eve of partition, hectic activities intensified by the Muslim League as well Congress with the former having an edge. A referendum had been proposed for Sylhet District (now in Bangladesh). Mazumdar along with Basanta Kumar Das (then Home Minister of Assam) travelled throughout the valley organising the Congress and addressing meetings educating the masses about the outcome of partition on the basis of religion. On 20 February 1947, Mazumdar inaugurated a convention – Assam Nationalist Muslim's Convention at Silchar. Thereafter another large meeting was held at Silchar on 8 June 1947. Both these meetings, which were attended by a large section of Muslims, paid dividends. He was also among the few who were instrumental in retaining the Barak Valley region of Assam with India. Mazumdar was the leader of the delegation that pleaded before the Radcliffe Commission (they met Mr Stork who was actually in the field on behalf of C. Radcliffe) that ensured that a part of Sylhet (now in Bangladesh) remains with India despite being Muslim-majority (present Karimganj district). He accompanied Gopinath Bordoloi when latter met Mahatma Gandhi against Grouping. That was in 1946 and was Mahatma's last visit to Guwahati as well as Assam. During that visit the Mahatma had stayed in Sarania Hill of the city. Although Fakhruddin Ali Ahmed was supposed to accompany Bordoloi, however, in view of his defeat at the hands of Muslim League candidate Matlib Mazumder had accompanied. His presence was significant as it showed that Muslim leaders in Assam were also against Grouping and even in Muslim-majority seats such as Hailakandi Muslim League faced defeat. Moulvi Mazumder's opposition to partition of India is widely known. Moulvi Mazumdar joined as a Cabinet Minister of Assam in 1946 with the portfolios of Local Self-Government, Agriculture and Veterinary.

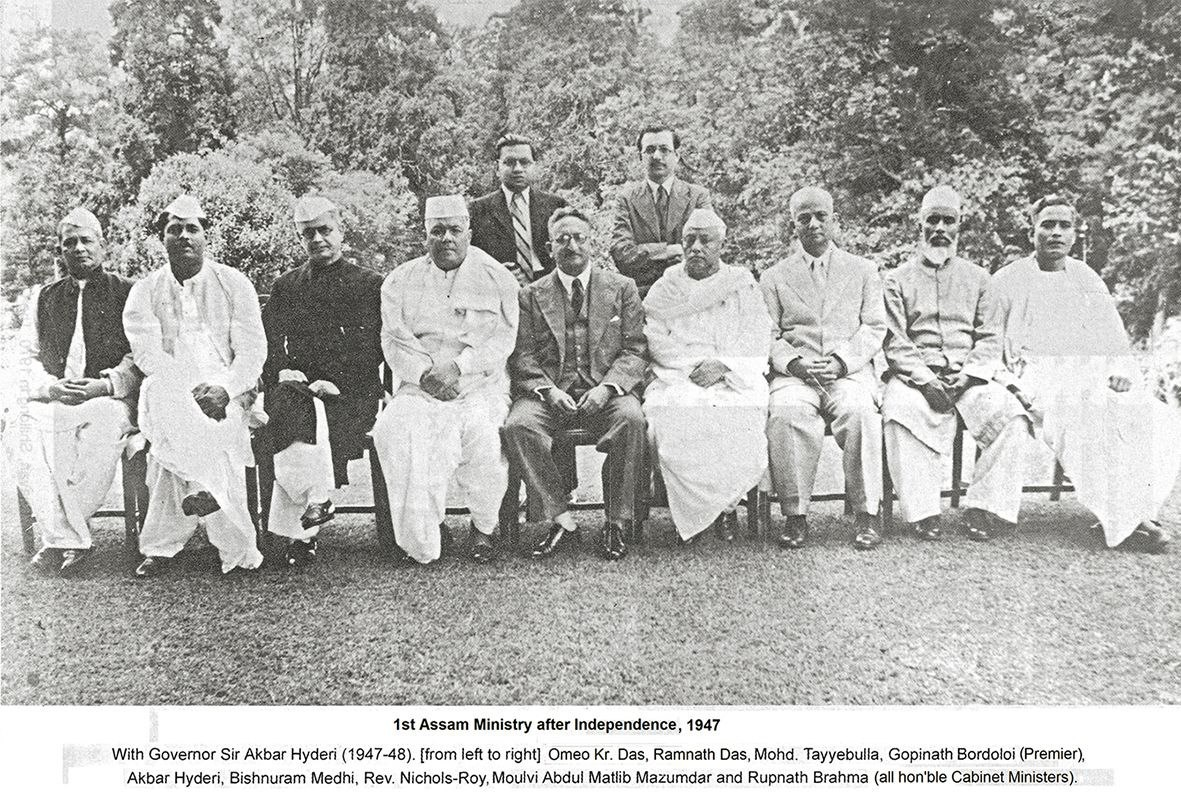
1st Assam Ministry after Independence, 1947

== Post-independence politics ==
In 1947, India became free from British rule, when Mazumdar again took charge of the same departments in Gopinath Bordoloi's cabinet as the only Muslim minister (Moulana Tayyebulla was inducted in 1948) and also the lone member from the entire Barak Valley region. The entire eastern India was swept by violence just after India's partition and independence on 15 August 1947, scores of Hindus fled the newly created East Pakistan (now Bangladesh) for India, and Muslims fled Assam for East Pakistan. A large number of people lost their lives owing to violence, which resurfaced with more ferocity in 1950. Mazumdar, the only Muslim in the cabinet, along with his cabinet and party colleagues took up responsibility for the safety of both Hindus and Muslims in Assam, touring affected areas and arranging camps and rehabilitation for the refugees, organizing supplies and security.

As Assam's first Minister of Veterinary, Agriculture, etc., he is credited with the establishment of Veterinary college at Nagaon. He continued as a Cabinet Minister in Bishnuram Medhi's cabinet till 1957. His last election was in 1967 when at the age of 77, Mazumdar reached Assam Assembly victorious. He then became the Minister for Law, Social Welfare and Political Sufferers in Bimala Prasad Chaliha's cabinet. As Law minister, he initiated the separation of executive and judiciary at the district level. During the Bangladesh's war of liberation in 1970–71, he was in charge of relief-&-rehabilitation of the thousands of refugees who fled the then East Pakistan. He resigned from active politics in 1971. Other posts held by him during his long career are the chairman, Assam Madrassa Board; chairman, State Haj Committee and the Pro tem Speaker of the Assam Legislative Assembly (in 1967). He was instrumental in setting up the hajj house [haji musafir khana] including its site selection at Guwahati. As Chairman of Madrassah Board, he initiated modernization of these theological schools and is also credited with the introduction of English and science in the curriculum of madrassas of Assam. He was the key person to set up centres of higher education at Hailakandi.

Moulvi Mazumdar was a socialist of the Gandhian type. He was deeply religious but strictly secular. He also had good command over Arabic, Persian and Urdu languages. His widow Sumsunnahar Mazumdar died in June 1989 at Guwahati. Mazumdar was a silent worker and hence, his works and role during India's partition on religious lines, especially in eastern India were relatively less publicised. Abdul Matlib Mazumder was, to quote Gauri Shankar Bhattacharjee, the Left politician from Assam and a contemporary of Mazumdar, 'honest, uncorrupt, incorruptible and simple man'.

Matlib Mazumder's second son, Abdul Muhib Mazumder who was a prominent lawyer of Gauhati High Court has represented Hailakandi Constituency for four terms as MLA and was also Cabinet Minister of Assam twice.
