= Aminul Haque Laskar =

Indian politician (born 1966)

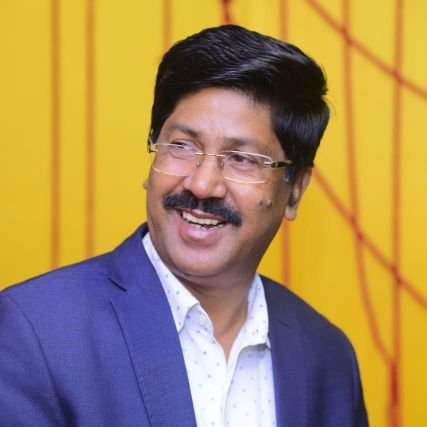
- Laskar in 2021

14th Deputy Speaker of the House Assam Legislative Assembly
- In office 30 July 2019 – 2 May 2021
- Governor: Banwarilal Purohit; Jagdish Mukhi
- Chief Minister: Sarbananda Sonowal
- Speaker: Hitendra Nath Goswami
- Preceded by: Kripanath Mallah
- Succeeded by: Numal Momin

Member of Assam Legislative Assembly
- In office 13 April 2016 – 2 May 2021
- Preceded by: Anamul Haque Laskar
- Succeeded by: Karim Uddin Barbhuiya
- Constituency: Sonai

Personal details
- Born: 1966 (age 59–60) Berenga Pt II, Silchar Assam India
- Party: Indian National Congress (2024-Present)
- Other political affiliations: Bharatiya Janata Party (2011–2024); Asom Gana Parishad (2001 2011)
- Children: 2
- Profession: Politician

Aminul Haque Laskar (born 8 May 1966) is an Indian politician of Indian National Congress from Assam . He was elected as the Deputy Speaker of the House Assam Legislative Assembly from 30 July 2019 to 2 May 2021 . He has been elected as an MLA in Assam Legislative Assembly election in 2016 from Sonai Assembly constituency . Aminul Haque Laskar was resigned from Bharatiya Janata Party on 19 March 2024 . He was joined Indian National Congress 20 March 2024 in Rajiv Bhawan Guwahati, Assam .

Aminul joined Congress after breaking thirteen years long tie with BJP.
