= Altaf Hussain Mazumdar =

Indian politician

Member of the Assam Legislative Assembly
- In office 1967–1972
- Preceded by: Raichand Nath
- Succeeded by: Dr. Lutfur Rahman
- Constituency: Barkhola
- In office 1978–1983
- Preceded by: Nurul Haque Choudhury
- Succeeded by: Nurul Haque Choudhury
- Constituency: Sonai
- In office 1983–1991
- Preceded by: A. F. Golam Osmani
- Succeeded by: Abdul Matin Mazumdar
- Constituency: Barkhola

Personal details
- Party: Indian National Congress

Altaf Hussain Mazumdar is an Indian politician who was elected to the Assam Legislative Assembly from Barkhola constituency in the 1967, 1983 and 1985 Assam Legislative Assembly election as a member of the Indian National Congress. He was also elected from the Sonai constituency in the 1983 Assam Legislative Assembly election as a member of the Janata Party.
