= Hazi Salim Uddin Barbhuiya =

Indian politician

MLA of Hailakandi Vidhan Sabha Constituency
- In office 2006–2011
- Preceded by: Sahab Uddin Choudhury
- Succeeded by: Abdul Muhib Mazumder

Personal details
- Party: All India United Democratic Front

Hazi Salim Uddin Barbhuiya (Bengali: হাজী সলিম উদ্দিন বড়ভুঁইয়া, Bengali pronunciation: [ɦadʒi ʃolim udːin bɔɽobʱũija]) is an Indian politician. He was elected as MLA of Hailakandi Vidhan Sabha constituency in Assam Legislative Assembly in the 2006 elections. He is an All India United Democratic Front politician.
