= Nanda Kishore Sinha =

Indian politician

Member of the Assam Legislative Assembly
- In office 1952–1962
- Preceded by: New constituency
- Succeeded by: Pulakeshi Singh
- Constituency: Sonai

Personal details
- Party: Indian National Congress

Nanda Kishore Sinha is an Indian politician and former MLA from Assam. He was elected to the Assam Legislative Assembly from Sonai constituency in the 1952 and 1957 Assam Legislative Assembly election as a member of the Indian National Congress.
