= Abdul Muhib Mazumder =

Indian politician (1932–2021)

Abdul Muhib Mazumder (20 August 1932 – 3 November 2021) was an Indian politician. He served as Minister of Assam and was originally from Hailakandi. He was the architect of the Illegal Migrants (Determination by Tribunals) Act, 1983. He was also a major contributor in drafting of the 1985 Assam Accord as the Law Minister of the state. His father was Abdul Matlib Mazumder.

Mazumder was born in Hailakandi town on 20 August 1932, the son of Abdul Matlib Mazumder, a freedom fighter and a Cabinet Minister of Assam between 1946 and 1970. After studying at Government Victoria Memorial High School at Hailakandi he obtained his B.Sc.(Hons.) degree from Cotton College, Guwahati, and his M.A. and LLB from Aligarh Muslim University. He married Alamara Mazumder on 3 June 1962 and had three daughters. He was a Senior Advocate of Gauhati High Court as well as the Supreme Court of India. Mazumder initially worked with Fakhruddin Ali Ahmed, former President of India and a senior lawyer of Gauhati High Court, and Jagadish Medhi, a leading legal authority. He was Senior Government Advocate for several years. He was also a lecturer in Economics and Political Science at Pragjyotish College (1956–1961) and at University Law College (1961–1980). He became Advocate General of Assam in 1980 (up to 1983) and then Advocate General of Arunachal Pradesh (1991–1996).

Mazumder entered politics in 1970s and represented LA-6 Hailakandi four times as Member of Legislative Assembly (MLA), from 1983 to 1991, 1996-2001 and 2011–2016; the constituency had been represented by his father from 1946 to 1972. He became a Cabinet Minister of Assam in 1983 in the Congress Ministry headed by Hiteswar Saikia looking after law, power and municipal administration departments until 1985. In 1990s he formed a new party called UPPA (United Peoples Party of Assam) and again became a Cabinet Minister of Assam in 1996 in the AGP-led coalition Ministry headed by Prafulla Kumar Mahanta looking after the Irrigation Department until 2001. Subsequently, he disbanded UPPA and became the President of Samajwadi Party in Assam. Later he came back to Congress. Mazumder was Deputy Leader of Opposition (1986–1991) and formerly Vice Chairman, State Planning Board of Assam. Other posts held by him were Member, State Security Commission; Member, AICC; Vice President APCC; Chairman APCC Minority Cell; Adviser Minority Department of APCC among others.

Mazumder's autobiography, Down the memory lane, was published in four volumes. These books not only had his experience described in an easy to understand language but also throw light of political history of Assam of mid1940s to mid1960s. Among his landmark cases was his defence of the late Prime Minister Indira Gandhi against her prosecution by the Tirkha Commission in 1977–78 in the High Court. Two other landmarks in his career were drafting of the IMDT Act (Illegal Migrants Determination by Tribunal Act) 1983 and Assam Accord 1985 as the then Law Minister of Assam. He had contributed significantly in the development of Hailakandi including setting up of Jawahar Navoday Vidyalay at Monachara, initiation of construction of several long bridges over Katakhal river and a network of black-topped roads.

Mazumder died on 3 November 2021 at the age of 89 in Gauhati Medical College and Hospital.
