= Anwar Hussain Laskar =

Indian politician (1964–2022)

Anwar Hussain Laskar (28 December 1964 – 18 July 2022), also known as Rana Bhai, was an Indian politician and lawmaker.

He was a member of the Assam Legislative Assembly from 1996 to 2006, elected from Sonai. He was a member of Asom Gana Parishad and later the Samajwadi Party.

He died from post COVID-19 complications in 2022.
