= Kurmi (disambiguation) =

Kurmi is a caste of India and Nepal.

Kurmi can also refer to:

- Kurmi Market, market in Kano, Kano state, Nigeria
- Kurmi, Nigeria, Local Government Area in Taraba state, Nigeria
- Kurmi, Republic of Dagestan, rural locality in the Republic of Dagestan, Russia
- Kurmi (surname)

== See also ==
- Kudmi Mahato, tribal community of India
- Sarai Kurmi, village in Uttar Pradesh, India
