= Sonitpur Lok Sabha constituency =

Coordinates: 26.28°N 94.07°E

Sonitpur AS-11
- Lok Sabha constituency
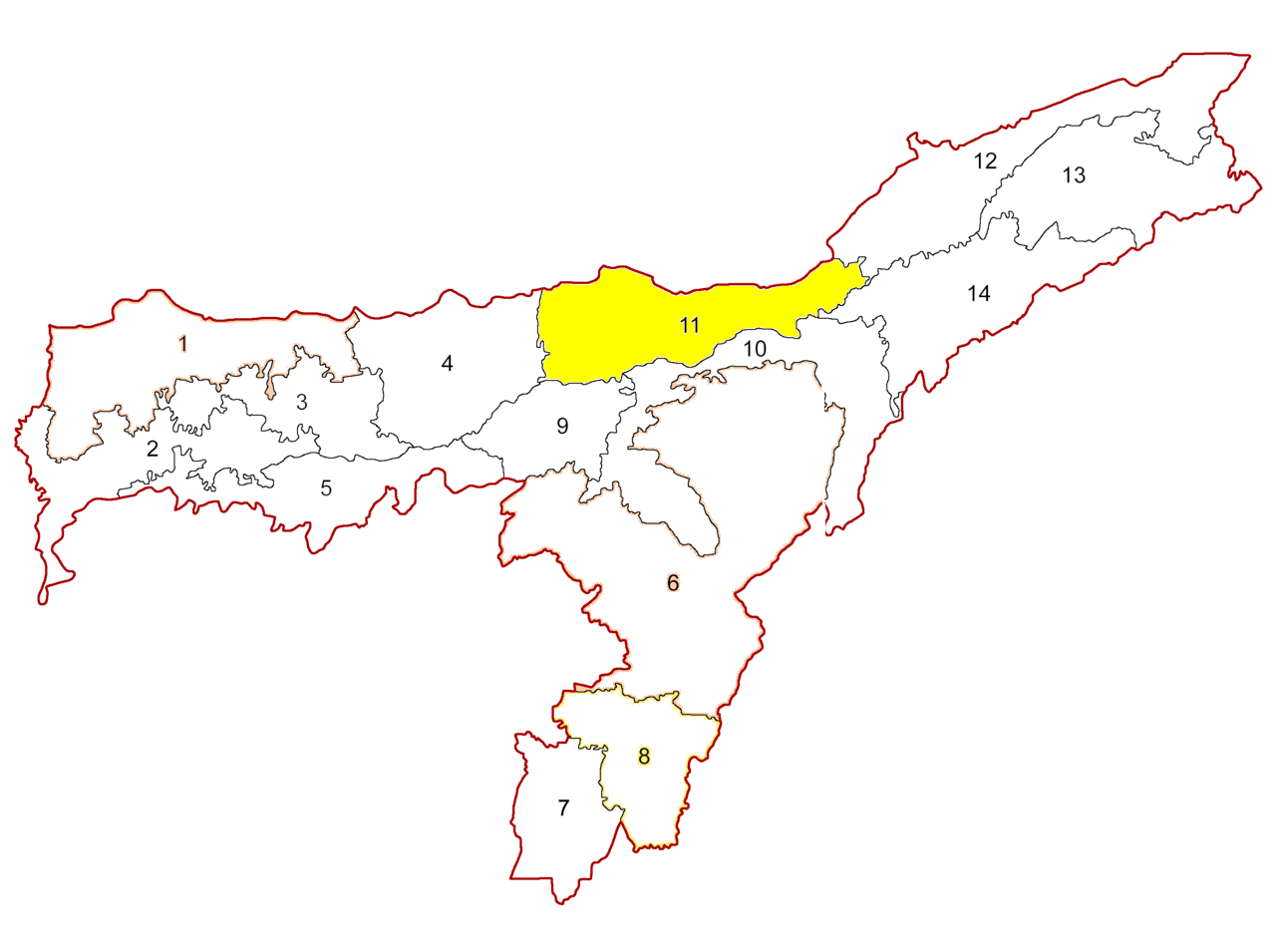
- Sonitpur Lok Sabha constituency within Assam

Constituency details
- Country: India
- Region: Northeast India
- State: Assam
- Assembly constituencies: Tezpur, Barchalla, Dhekiajuli, Biswanath, Nadaur, Bihpuria, Rangapara, Gohpur and Behali
- Established: 2023
- Reservation: None

Member of Parliament
- 18th Lok Sabha
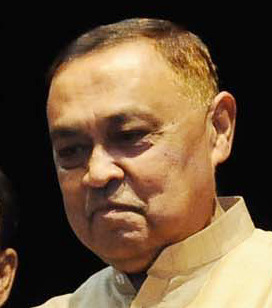
- Incumbent Ranjit Dutta
- Party: BJP
- Alliance: NDA
- Elected year: 2024

Sonitpur Lok Sabha constituency is one of the 14 Lok Sabha constituencies in Assam state in north-eastern India.

== Assembly segments ==
Vote share of Winning candidates
2024	60.21%

No.	Name	Reserved for (SC/ST/None)	District	Member	Party	2024 Lead
65.	Dhekiajuli	None	Sonitpur	Ashok Singhal	BJP	BJP
66.	Barchalla	None	Sonitpur	Ritu Baran Sarmah	BJP	BJP
67.	Tezpur	None	Sonitpur	Prithiraj Rava	AGP	BJP
68.	Rangapara	None	Sonitpur	Krishna Kamal Tanti	BJP	BJP
69.	Nadaur	None	Sonitpur	Padma Hazarika	BJP	BJP
70.	Biswanath	None	Biswanath	Pallab Lochan Das	BJP	BJP
71.	Behali	SC	Biswanath	Munindra Das	BJP	BJP
72.	Gohpur	None	Biswanath	Utpal Borah	BJP	BJP
73.	Bihpuria	None	Lakhimpur	Bhupen Kumar Borah	BJP	BJP

== Members of Parliament ==
Election	Name	Portrait	Party	Runner-up Candidate	Party
2024	Ranjit Dutta		Bharatiya Janata Party	Premlal Gunju	Indian National Congress

== Election results ==
=== 2024 ===
2024 Indian general elections: Sonitpur
Party	Candidate	Votes	%	±%
BJP	Ranjit Dutta	7,75,788	60.21	
INC	Premlal Gunju	4,14,380	32.16	
AAP	Rishiraj Kaundinya	33,048	2.56	
BPF	Raju Deuri	19,892	1.54	
NOTA	None of the above	18,748	1.46	
Majority		3,61,408	28.05	
Turnout		12,90,556	78.74	
BJP win (new seat)				

== Constituency wise results ==
2024 Lok Sabha Election Results
Constituency number	Name	Ranjit Dutta	Premlal Gunju	Rishiraj Kaundinya
65	Dhekiajuli			
66	Barchalla			
67	Tezpur	78,268	48,116	5,890
68	Rangapara			
69	Sootea			
70	Biswanath			
71	Behali			
72	Gohpur			
73	Bihpuria			

== See also ==
- List of constituencies of the Lok Sabha
