= 2009 Indian general election in Assam =

- April–May 2009

14 seats
- Turnout: 69.54%
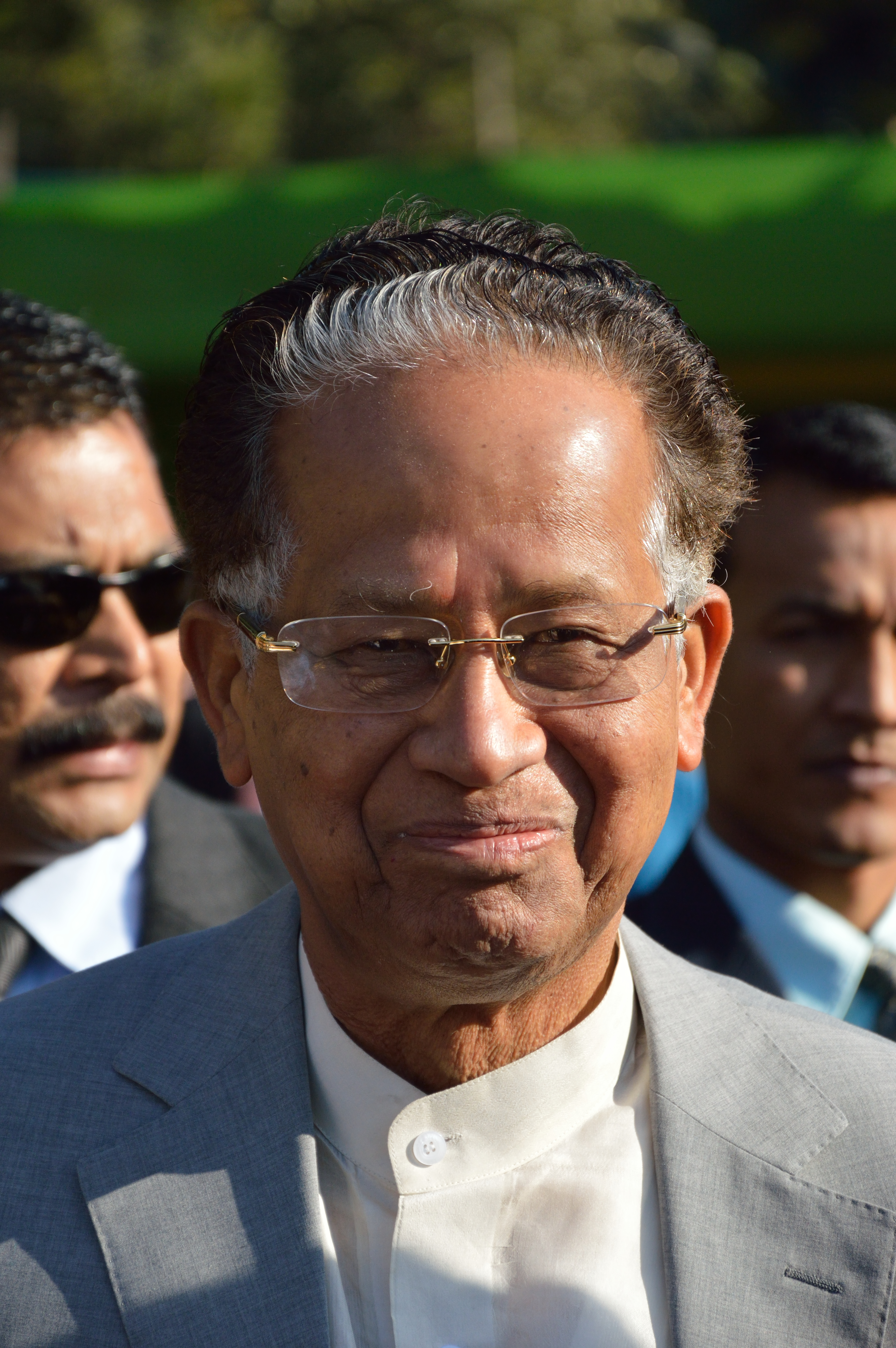

| | First party | Second party |
|---|---|---|
| Party | UPA | NDA |
| Last election | 9 | 2 |
| Seats won | 7 | 5 |
| Seat change | ▼2 | ▲3 |
| Percentage | 34.89% | 30.81% |
Prime Minister before election
Manmohan Singh
INC
Prime Minister after election
Manmohan Singh
INC

The 2009 Indian general election polls in Assam were held for 14 seats in the state. United Progressive Alliance won 7 of the 14 seats, these all 7 seats were won by Congress. The NDAs Bharatiya Janata Party won 4 seats and Asom Gana Parishad won one seat.

== Parties and alliances ==
=== National Democratic Alliance ===
| Party | Flag | Symbol | Leader | Seats contested |
|---|---|---|---|---|
| Bharatiya Janata Party | | | Ramen Deka | 7 |
| Asom Gana Parishad | | | Chandra Mohan Patowary | 6 |
| Rashtrawadi Sena | | | Arun Das | 1 |

=== United Progressive Alliance ===
| Party | Flag | Symbol | Leader | Seats contested |
|---|---|---|---|---|
| Indian National Congress | | | Tarun Gogoi | 13 |
| Bodoland People's Front (Note: In 2009, BPF did not get State Party recognition, so the eci has allotted Rail engine symbol in Kokrajhar and Kettle symbol in Mangaldoi constituencies.) | | | Hagrama Mohilary | 2 (Note: Friendly Contest on Mangaldoi Lok Sabha constituency between INC and BPF.) |
| Total | | | | 14 + 1 (Note: Friendly Contest on Mangaldoi Lok Sabha constituency between INC and BPF.) |

=== Others ===
| Party | Flag | Symbol | Leader | Seats contested |
|---|---|---|---|---|
| Assam United Democratic Front | | | Badruddin Ajmal | 9 |

== List of candidates ==
| Constituency | | | | | | | |
| Constituency | | NDA | | UPA | | AUDF | |
| 1 | Karimganj | BJP | Sudhangshu Das | INC | Lalit Mohan Suklabaidya | AIUDF | Rajesh Mallah |
| 2 | Silchar | BJP | Kabindra Purkayastha | INC | Santosh Mohan Dev | AIUDF | Badruddin Ajmal |
| 3 | Autonomous District | BJP | Kulendra Daulagupu | INC | Biren Singh Engti | | |
| 4 | Dhubri | RWS | Arun Das | INC | Anwar Hussain | AIUDF | Badruddin Ajmal |
| 5 | Kokrajhar | AGP | Sabda Ram Rabha | BPF | S. K. Bwiswmuthiary | | |
| 6 | Barpeta | AGP | Bhupen Ray | INC | Ismail Hussain | AIUDF | Abdus Samad Ahmed |
| 7 | Gauhati | BJP | Bijoya Chakravarty | INC | Robin Bordoloi | AIUDF | Sonabor Ali |
| 8 | Mangaldoi | BJP | Ramen Deka | INC | Madhab Rajbangshi | AIUDF | Badiuj Zamal |
| 9 | Tezpur | AGP | Joseph Toppo | INC | Moni Kumar Subba | AIUDF | Deba Orang |
| 10 | Nowgong | BJP | Rajen Gohain | INC | Anil Raja | AIUDF | Sirajuddin Ajmal |
| 11 | Kaliabor | AGP | Gunin Hazarika | INC | Dip Gogoi | AIUDF | Sirajuddin Ajmal |
| 12 | Jorhat | BJP | Kamakhya Prasad Tasa | INC | Bijoy Krishna Handique | | |
| 13 | Dibrugarh | AGP | Sarbananda Sonowal | INC | Paban Singh Ghatowar | | |
| 14 | Lakhimpur | AGP | Arun Kumar Sarmah | INC | Ranee Narah | | |

== Results ==
| Alliance/ Party | | Popular vote | | | Seats | | |
| Alliance/ Party | | Votes | % | ±pp | Contested | Won | +/− |
|---|---|---|---|---|---|---|---|
| UPA | INC | 42,35,681 | 34.89 | ▼0.18 | 13 | 7 | ▼2 |
| UPA | BPF | 6,56,430 | 5.41 | New | 1+1 | 1 | ▲1 |
| UPA | Total | 48,92,111 | 40.30 | Steady | 14+1 | 8 | Steady |
| NDA | BJP | 19,67,813 | 16.21 | ▼6.73 | 7 | 4 | ▲2 |
| NDA | AGP | 17,73,103 | 14.60 | ▼5.35 | 6 | 1 | ▼1 |
| NDA | RWS | 96,499 | 0.79 | New | 1+4 | 0 | Steady |
| NDA | Total | 38,37,415 | 31.60 | Steady | 14+4 | 5 | Steady |
| AUDF | | 19,54,901 | 16.10 | New | 9 | 1 | ▲1 |
| Others | | 5,35,365 | 4.41 | Steady | 43 | 0 | Steady |
| IND | | 9,21,379 | 7.59 | ▼5.82 | 73 | 0 | ▼1 |
| Total | | 1,21,41,171 | 100% | - | 158 | 14 | - |

== Winning candidates ==
| Constituency | | Winner | | | | Runner Up | | | | Margin | % |
| # | Name | Candidate | Party | Votes | % | Candidate | Party | Votes | % | Margin | % |
|---|---|---|---|---|---|---|---|---|---|---|---|
| 1 | Karimganj | Lalit Suklabaidya | INC | 259,717 | 37.89 | Rajesh Mallah | AUDF | 251,797 | 36.74 | 7,920 | 1.15 |
| 2 | Silchar | K. Purkayastha | BJP | 243,532 | 35.37 | Badruddin Ajmal | AUDF | 202,062 | 29.35 | 41,470 | 6.02 |
| 3 | Auton. District | Biren Singh Engti | INC | 197,835 | 41.17 | Elwin Teron | ASDC | 123,287 | 25.66 | 74,548 | 15.51 |
| 4 | Dhubri | Badruddin Ajmal | AUDF | 540,820 | 51.66 | Anwar Hussain | INC | 356,401 | 34.04 | 184,419 | 17.62 |
| 5 | Kokrajhar | Sansuma Khunggur | BOPF | 495,211 | 48.80 | Urkhao Brahma | IND | 304,889 | 30.04 | 190,322 | 18.76 |
| 6 | Barpeta | Ismail Hussain | INC | 322,137 | 35.75 | Bhupen Ray | AGP | 291,708 | 32.37 | 30,429 | 3.38 |
| 7 | Gauhati | Bijoya Chakravarty | BJP | 496,047 | 44.74 | Capt. Robin Bordoloi | INC | 484,192 | 43.67 | 11,855 | 1.07 |
| 8 | Mangaldoi | Ramen Deka | BJP | 307,881 | 31.15 | Madhab Rajbangshi | INC | 252,032 | 25.50 | 55,849 | 5.65 |
| 9 | Tezpur | Joseph Toppo | AGP | 352,246 | 41.78 | Moni Kumar Subba | INC | 322,093 | 38.21 | 30,153 | 3.57 |
| 10 | Nowgong | Rajen Gohain | BJP | 380,921 | 38.11 | Anil Raja | INC | 335,541 | 33.57 | 45,380 | 4.54 |
| 11 | Kaliabor | Dip Gogoi | INC | 434,676 | 45.25 | Gunin Hazarika | AGP | 282,687 | 29.43 | 151,989 | 15.82 |
| 12 | Jorhat | Bijoy Handique | INC | 362,320 | 47.46 | Kamakhya Tasa | BJP | 290,406 | 38.04 | 71,914 | 9.42 |
| 13 | Dibrugarh | Paban Ghatowar | INC | 359,163 | 47.87 | Sarbananda Sonowal | AGP | 324,020 | 43.19 | 35,143 | 4.68 |
| 14 | Lakhimpur | Ranee Narah | INC | 352,330 | 38.73 | Dr. Arun Kr. Sarma | AGP | 307,758 | 33.83 | 44,572 | 4.90 |

== Post-election Union Council of Ministers from Assam ==
| # | Name | Constituency | Designation | Department | From | To | Party |
|---|---|---|---|---|---|---|---|
| 1 | Manmohan Singh | Assam (Rajya Sabha) | Prime Minister | Prime Minister; Personnel, Public Grievances and Pensions; Atomic Energy; Space; Planning | 22 May 2009 | 26 May 2014 | INC |
| 2 | Bijoy Krishna Handique | Jorhat | Cabinet Minister | Mines | 28 May 2009 | 19 January 2011 | INC |
| 2 | Bijoy Krishna Handique | Jorhat | Cabinet Minister | Development of North Eastern Region | 28 May 2009 | 12 July 2011 | INC |
| 3 | Paban Singh Ghatowar | Dibrugarh | MoS (I/C) | Development of North Eastern Region | 12 July 2011 | 26 May 2014 | INC |
| 3 | Paban Singh Ghatowar | Dibrugarh | MoS | Parliamentary Affairs | 20 July 2011 | 28 October 2012 | INC |
| 4 | Ranee Narah | Lakhimpur | MoS | Tribal Affairs | 28 October 2012 | 26 May 2014 | INC |
