= Tanti =

Caste in India

Regions with significant populations
- India

Languages
- Gujarati, Marathi, Bhojpuri, Bengali, Odia, Assamese, Tripuri, Hindi

Religion
- Hinduism

Tanti (Hindi: तांती also anglicised as Tanty, Tantee, Tatwa, Tantubaya, Tantubai, Tati, Tatin) is a Hindu surname of cloth weaving and cloth merchant community in India. The greatest concentration is believed to be in the states of Gujarat, Maharashtra, Jharkhand, Bihar, Uttar Pradesh, West Bengal, Assam, Tripura and Odisha. Tanti is a Hindu surname used only by the cloth weaving and cloth trading communities across India.

== Origin ==
The word tanti is derived from the Sanskrit word tantu, which means "thread", indicative of the community's connection to weaving. They are one of the many communities found in South Asia, traditionally associated with cloth trading. The community is found in Gujarat, Maharashtra, Jharkhand, Bihar, Uttar Pradesh, West Bengal, Assam, Tripura as well as Odisha.The Tanti have Gotra's- Nagasya, Sal, Shandilya, Kashyapa

The Tanti are said to have originated as sellers of cloth since the ancient days.Their main business was to sell manufactured cloths as they were completely imbibed in their cloth and textile business.The Tanti Community people are found mostly across the northeastern portion of India apart from the state of Gujarat .

== Social status ==
Tanti are considered as an Other Backward Class in Odisha, Jharkhand, Bihar, West Bengal, Assam Tripura, and Uttar Pradesh.

Tanti are considered a Forward community in Gujarat.

== Notable people ==
Notable people with the surname Tanti, Tanty or Tantee who may or may not belong to Tanti caste are as follows:

- Durga Charan Tanti, Indian politician from the state of Odisha. He is a Member of Odisha Legislative Assembly from Raghunathpali as a member of the Bharatiya Janata Party.
- Gangadhar Meher, an Odia poet of the 19th century.
- Bhadreswar Tanti, Indian politician. He was elected to the Members of Parliament the lower house of Indian state from Kaliabor Lok Sabha constituency in Assam in 1984. He was a member of the Asom Gana Parishad. Later he joined Bharat Vikas Morcha.
- Bhimananda Tanti, Indian politician from the state of Assam. He is a former Member of Assam Legislative Assembly and a former Deputy Speaker of the Assembly.
- Gajen Tanti, Indian politician and cabinet minister of Assam (1972) from the Tea Labour Community. He was a member of Indian National Congress, Indian National Congress (Socialist) and Nationalist Congress Party.
- Kamal Kumar Tanti, (born 1982) an Assamese poet from Assam, India.
- Sananta Tanty, Indian poet of Assamese literature. Tanty was born to an Odia family in Kalinagar Tea Estate. He was educated at a Bengali-medium school but continued his literary works in Assamese.
- Tulsi Tanti, Indian businessman, the founder and chairman-cum-managing director of Suzlon. He was known as the "Wind man of India"
- Dileswar Tanti, Indian politician from the state of Assam. He was elected to the Doom Dooma constituency 6 times and was a labour minister in the Hiteswar Saikia cabinet.
- Sameer Tanti, Assamese language poet from India. He is the 2012 winner of the Assam Valley Literary Award.
- Krishna Kamal Tanti, Bharatiya Janata Party politician from the Indian state of Assam. He has been elected in Assam Legislative Assembly election in 2021 from Rangapara. He is also a member of the advisory board on Child Labour.
