= Tezpur Lok Sabha constituency =

Former Lok Sabha constituency in Assam

Coordinates: 26.7°N 92.8°E

Tezpur
- Former Lok Sabha constituency
- Tezpur Lok Sabha constituency in Assam

Constituency details
- Country: India
- Region: Northeast India
- State: Assam
- Established: 1967
- Abolished: 2023

Tezpur was a former Lok Sabha constituency in Assam. After the delimitation, the constituency's area changed, and the name was changed to Sonitpur.

== Members of Parliament ==
=== Members of Parliament ===
| Year | Lok Sabha | Winner | Party | Runner-up | Party |
|---|---|---|---|---|---|
Darrang Lok Sabha Constituency (1952-1967)
| 1952 | 1st | Kamakhya Prasad Tripathy | Indian National Congress | H.C. Barua | Socialist Party |
| 1957 | 2nd | Bijoy Chandra Bhagavati | Indian National Congress | Unopposed | N/A |
| 1962 | 3rd | Bijoy Chandra Bhagavati | Indian National Congress | Prasanta Baruah | Praja Socialist Party |
Tezpur lok Sabha Constituency (1967-2023)
| 1967 | 4th | Bijoy Chandra Bhagavati | Indian National Congress | G.Mahanta | Praja Socialist Party |
| 1971 | 5th | Kamala Prasad Agarwala | Indian National Congress | Francis Hans | Independent politician |
| 1977 | 6th | Purna Narayan Sinha | Bharatiya Lok Dal | Bijoy Chandra Bhagavati | Indian National Congress |
| 1980 | 7th | Election not held in Assam | | | |
| 1984 | 8th | Bipinpal Das | Indian National Congress | Purna Narayan Sinha | Janata Party |
| 1989 | 9th | Election not held in Assam | | | |
| 1991 | 10th | Swarup Upadhyay | Indian National Congress | Purna Narayan Sinha | Asom Gana Parishad |
| 1996 | 11th | Iswar Prasanna Hazarika | Indian National Congress | Harsha Bahadur Biswakarma | Asom Gana Parishad |
| 1998 | 12th | Moni Kumar Subba | Indian National Congress | Iswar Prasanna Hazarika | Bharatiya Janata Party |
| 1999 | 13th | Moni Kumar Subba | Indian National Congress | Ram Prasad Sharma | Bharatiya Janata Party |
| 2004 | 14th | Moni Kumar Subba | Indian National Congress | Padma Hazarika | Asom Gana Parishad |
| 2009 | 15th | Joseph Toppo | Asom Gana Parishad | Moni Kumar Subba | Indian National Congress |
| 2014 | 16th | Ram Prasad Sharma | Bharatiya Janata Party | Bhupen Kumar Borah | Indian National Congress |
| 2019 | 17th | Pallab Lochan Das | Bharatiya Janata Party | M.G.V.K. Bhanu | Indian National Congress |
Sonitpur Lok Sabha Constituency(2024-present)
| 2024 | 18th | Ranjit Dutta | Bharatiya Janata Party | Premlal Gunju | Indian National Congress |

== Election results ==
=== 17th Lok Sabha: 2019 General Elections ===
2019 Indian general elections: Tezpur
| Party | Candidate | Votes | % | ±% |
|---|---|---|---|---|
| BJP | Pallab Lochan Das | 684,166 | 57.48 | |
| INC | M.G.V.K. Bhanu | 4,41,325 | 37.03 | |
| AIUDF | Bijoy Kumar Tiru | 23,646 | 1.98 | |
| NOTA | None of the Above | 15,626 | 1.31 | |
| Voters Party International | Mahendra Orang | 7,966 | 0.67 | |
| NCP | Mahendra Bhuyan | 6,483 | 0.54 | |
| NPP | Ram Kumar Sunar | 5,880 | 0.49 | |
| Independent | Zaibur Rahman Khan | 5,104 | 0.43 | |
| Majority | | 2,42,841 | 20.40 | |
| Turnout | | 11,91,885 | 79.48 | |
| BJP hold | | Swing | | |

=== 16th Lok Sabha: 2014 General Elections ===
2014 Indian general elections: Tezpur
| Party | Candidate | Votes | % | ±% |
|---|---|---|---|---|
| BJP | Ram Prasad Sarmah | 4,46,511 | 45.52 | +45.52 |
| INC | Bhupen Kumar Borah | 3,60,491 | 36.75 | −1.46 |
| Independent | Moni Kumar Subba | 62,730 | 6.40 | +6.40 |
| AGP | Joseph Toppo | 40,489 | 4.13 | −37.65 |
| CPI(M) | Khemraj Chetry | 24,910 | 2.54 | −1.82 |
| NOTA | None of the above | 16,667 | 1.70 | −−− |
| CPI(ML)L | Lakshikanta Kurmi | 10,725 | 1.09 | −0.29 |
| AITC | Gopi Chand Shahabadi | 8,712 | 0.89 | +0.89 |
| Independent | Elias Kujur | 5,207 | 0.53 | +0.53 |
| AIFB | Rajen Saikia | 4,246 | 0.43 | +0.43 |
| Majority | | 86,020 | 8.77 | +5.20 |
| Turnout | | 9,80,846 | 77.87 | |
| BJP gain from AGP | | Swing | +41.59 | |

=== 15th Lok Sabha: 2009 General Elections ===
2009 Indian general elections: Tezpur
| Party | Candidate | Votes | % | ±% |
|---|---|---|---|---|
| AGP | Joseph Toppo | 352,246 | 29.11 | |
| INC | Moni Kumar Subba | 3,22,093 | 26.62 | |
| AIUDF | Deba Orang | 46,255 | 3.82 | |
| CPI(M) | Jiten Sundi | 36,734 | 3.04 | |
| Independent | Rudra Parajuli | 19,684 | 1.63 | |
| Independent | Prasanta Boro | 14,613 | 1.21 | |
| CPI(ML)L | Rubul Sarma | 11,657 | 0.96 | |
| Independent | Dr. Pranab Kumar Das | 7,750 | 0.65 | |
| Independent Politician | MD. Nazir Ahmed | 6,208 | 0.51 | N/A |
| BVM | Arun Kumar Murmoo | 5,645 | 0.47 | N/A |
| Independent Politician | Daniel David Bharali | 5,646 | 0.47 | N/A |
| Independent | Kalyan Kumar Deori Bharali | 4,317 | 0.36 | N/A |
| RSPS | Regionld V. Johnson | 3,857 | 0.32 | N/A |
| SP | Jugananda Hazarika | 3,464 | 0.29 | |
| JMM | Parashmoni Sinha | 3,228 | 0.27 | N/A |
| Margin of victory | | 30,153 | 3.58 | |
| Turnout | | 8,43,014 | 69.66 | |
| AGP gain from INC | | Swing | | |

14th Lok Sabha:2004 Indian general election

2004 Indian general elections: Tezpur
| Party | Candidate | Votes | % | ±% |
|---|---|---|---|---|
| INC | Moni Kumar Subba | 2,89,847 | | |
| AGP | Padma Hazarika | 2,19,402 | | |
| BJP | Ghisa Lal Agarwala | 1,64,662 | | |
| CPI(ML)L | Rubul Sarma | 24,595 | | |
| Independent | Dipen Tanti | 21,262 | | |
| Majority | | 70,445 | | |
| Turnout | | 7,19,768 | | |
| INC gain from | | Swing | | |

1999 Indian general elections: Tezpur
| Party | Candidate | Votes | % | ±% |
|---|---|---|---|---|
| INC | Moni Kumar Subba | | | |
| BJP | Ram Prasad Sarmah | | | |
| AGP | Dr. Khoseswar Bora | | | |
| Independent | | | | |
| CPI(ML)L | Bibek Das | | | |
| NCP | | | | |
| Independent | | | | |
| Independent | | | | |
| Independent Politician | | | | N/A |
| Independent | | | | |
| Independent Politician | | | | N/A |
| Independent | | | | |
| RSPS | | | | |
| SP | | | | |
| JMM | | | | |
| Margin of victory | | 30,153 | 3.58 | |
| Turnout | | 8,43,014 | 69.66 | |
| AGP gain from INC | | Swing | | |

1957 Indian general election : Tezpur Lok Sabha Constituency
| Party | Candidate | Votes | % | ±% |
|---|---|---|---|---|
| INC | Bijoy Chandra Bhagavati | Elected Unopposed | N/A | N/A |
| INC hold | | Swing | | |

== See also ==
- Tezpur
- Sonitpur Lok Sabha constituency
- List of constituencies of the Lok Sabha
