= Biswanath Assembly constituency =

Constituency of the Assam legislative assembly in India

Biswanath
- Constituency No. 70 for the Assam Legislative Assembly

Constituency details
- Country: India
- Region: Northeast India
- State: Assam
- District: Biswanath
- Lok Sabha constituency: Sonitpur
- Established: 1957
- Reservation: None

Biswanath Assembly constituency is one of the 126 assembly constituencies of Assam Legislative Assembly. Biswanath forms part of the Sonitpur Lok Sabha constituency.

== Town details ==
Following are details on Biswanath Assembly constituency:

- Country: India.
- State: Assam.
- District: Biswanath district
- Lok Sabha Constituency: Sonitpur Lok Sabha constituency
- Area Includes: Biswanath MB, Sakomotha Dev. Block, Biswanath Dev. Block(Part), Baghmora Dev. Block(Part), Sootea Dev. Block(Part).

== Members of Legislative Assembly ==
Election	Member	Party affiliation
1957	Kamakhya Prasad Tripathi	Indian National Congress
1962	Kamakhya Prasad Tripathi	Indian National Congress
1967	Kamakhya Prasad Tripathi	Indian National Congress
1972	Kosheswar Bora	Independent
1978	Kosheswar Bora	Janata Party
1985	Padmanath Koiri	Independent
1991	Nurjamal Sarkar	Indian National Congress
1996	Prabin Hazarika	Asom Gana Parishad
2001	Nurjamal Sarkar	Indian National Congress
2006	Nurjamal Sarkar	Indian National Congress
2011	Prabin Hazarika	Asom Gana Parishad
2016	Promod Borthakur	Bharatiya Janata Party
2021	Promod Borthakur	Bharatiya Janata Party

== Election results ==
=== 2026 ===
2026 Assam Legislative Assembly election: Biswanath
Party	Candidate	Votes	%	±%
BJP	Pallab Lochan Das	84862	52.73	
INC	Jayanta Borah	59092	36.72	
JMM	TEHARU GOUR	12501	7.77	
NOTA	NOTA	1855	1.15	
Margin of victory		25770	16.01	
Turnout		160934		
BJP hold		Swing		

=== 2016 ===
2016 Assam Legislative Assembly election: Biswanath
Party	Candidate	Votes	%	±%
BJP	Promod Borthakur	64,225	52.33	
INC	Nurjamal Sarkar	54,105	44.08	
JD(U)	Gopi Chand Shahabadi	2,056	1.67	
NOTA	None of the above	2,341	1.90	
Majority		10,120	8.25	
Turnout		1,22,727	86.95	
Registered electors		1,41,134		
BJP gain from AGP		Swing		

=== 2011 ===
2011 Assam Legislative Assembly election: Biswanath
Party	Candidate	Votes	%	±%
AGP	Prabin Hazarika	48,104	45.51	
INC	Nurjamal Sarkar	46,605	44.09	
BJP	Diganta Ghatuwar	6,156	5.82	
Independent	Abdul Rajek	2,178	2.06	
AIUDF	Hifzur Rahman	1,566	1.48	
AITC	Kalyan Deori Bharali	1,102	1.04	
Majority		1,499	1.42	
Turnout		1,05,711	81.68	
Registered electors		1,29,414		
AGP gain from INC		Swing		

== See also ==
- Bishwanath Chariali
- Biswanath
- List of constituencies of Assam Legislative Assembly
