= Rupam =

Rupam is a unisex given name. Notable people with the name include:

- Rupam Islam (born 1974), Indian singer-songwriter
- Rupam Kurmi (died 2004), Indian politician
- Rupam Sarmah, Indian-born musician
