= Promod (given name) =

Promod is a given name. Notable people with the name include:

- Promod Borthakur, Bharatiya Janata Party politician
- Promod Maduwantha (born 1997), Sri Lankan cricketer
