= Diganta Ghatowal =

Indian politician

Member of Assam Legislative Assembly
- In office 13 November 2024 – 4 May 2026
- Preceded by: Ranjit Dutta
- Succeeded by: Munindra Das
- Constituency: Behali

Personal details
- Party: Bharatiya Janata Party
- Profession: Politician

Diganta Ghatowal is an Indian politician from Assam. He has been a member of the Assam Legislative Assembly from 2024 to 2026, representing the Behali constituency as a member of the Bharatiya Janata Party.

== See also ==
- List of chief ministers of Assam
- Assam Legislative Assembly
