= Munindra Das =

Indian politician (born 1982)

- মুনিন্দ্ৰ দাস

Member of the Assam Legislative Assembly
- In office 2026–2031
- Preceded by: Diganta Ghatowal
- Constituency: Behali, Assam

Personal details
- Born: Behali, Biswanath
- Citizenship: India
- Party: Bhartiya Janta Party
- Parent(s): Mohan Chandra Das (Father)
- Education: All India Secondary School Examination
- Alma mater: National Institute of Open Schooling
- Occupation: MLA
- Profession: Agriculturist
- Nickname: Bapti

Munindra Das (born 1982) is an Indian politician from Assam. He is a member of 16th Assam Legislative Assembly representing Bharatiya Janata Party from the Behali Assembly constituency, in the erstwhile Sonitpur district, re-named as Biswanath district in 2015.

== Personal life ==
Munindra is from Behali, Biswanath district, Assam. He is the son of Mohan Chandra Das. Currently he earns his income through agriculture and his wife is a teacher in a private school.

== Education ==
He completed Class 10 passing the HSLC examinations through National Institute of Open Schooling in 2025.

== Political career ==
Das won the Behali Assembly constituency representing Bharatiya Janata Party in the 2026 Assam Legislative Assembly election. He defeated Gyanendra Sarkar of the Communist Party of India (Marxist–Leninist) Liberation, by a huge margin.

== Posts held ==
From	To	Position	Comments
2026	2031	Member, 16th Legislative Assembly of Assam from Behali	

== Elections contested ==
=== 2026 ===
2026 Assam Legislative Assembly election: Behali
Party	Candidate	Votes	%	±%
BJP	Munindra Das	87224	65.86	▲15.25
CPI(ML)L	Gyanendra Sarkar	26521	20.03	▲14.97
Independent	Ajoy Kumar Singha	13294	10.04	
Gana Suraksha Party	Paban Pran Rabidas	1999	1.51	
NOTA	None of the above	3397	3	▲1.5
Margin of victory		60703	45.84	▲36.83
Turnout		132435		31.56
BJP hold		Swing	▲15.25	
