= Bhimananda Tanti =

22nd Deputy Speaker of the Assam Legislative Assembly

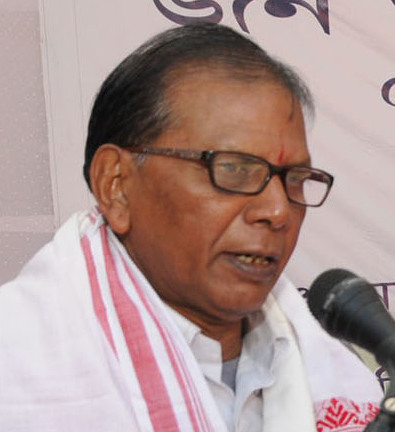
- Tanti in 2014

Deputy Speaker of Assam Legislative Assembly
- In office 6 June 2011 - 19 May 2016
- Speaker: Pranab Kumar Gogoi
- Preceded by: Pranati Phukan
- Succeeded by: Dilip Kumar Paul

Member of Assam Legislative Assembly
- In office 13 May 2011 - 19 May 2016
- Preceded by: Abhjit Hazarika
- Succeeded by: Pallab Lochan Das
- Constituency: Rangapara
- In office 11 November 2009 - 13 May 2011
- Preceded by: Joseph Toppo
- Succeeded by: Habul Chakraborty
- Constituency: Dhekiajuli
- In office 1996 - 2006
- Preceded by: Golok Rajbanshi
- Succeeded by: Abhjit Hazarika
- Constituency: Rangapara

Personal details
- Political party: Indian National Congress
- Parent: Othara Tanti (Father)
- Occupation: Politician

Bhimananda Tanti (born c. 1956) is an Indian politician from the state of Assam. He is a former Member of Assam Legislative Assembly and a former Deputy Speaker of the Assembly.

== Early life and education ==
Tanti is the son of the late Othara Tanti. He has a B.A from Gauhati University, Darrang college Tezpur in 1972.

== Political career ==
Tanti was the Indian National Congress candidate for the Rangapara constituency in 1996. He received 32555 votes, 47.67% of the total vote. He defeated his nearest opponent by 14195 votes and became Member of Assam Legislative Assembly for Rangapara, succeeding Golok Rabjanshi.

In the 2001 Assam Legislative Assembly election, Tanti received 40043 votes, 51.28% of the total vote, defeating his nearest opponent by 22579 votes.

In the 2006 Assam Legislative Assembly election Tanti was again the Indian National Congress candidate for Rangapara. He received 31065 votes, coming second and losing to BJP candidate Abhjit Hazarika.

In 2009, sitting AGP MLA Joseph Toppo was elected to the Lok Sabha which triggered a by-election in Dhekiajuli. Tanti was the Indian National Congress candidate for the constituency and defeated his nearest competitor by over 21000 votes.

Instead of seeking reelection in Dhekiajuli, in the 2011 Assam Legislative Assembly election Tanti instead sought the Rangapara constituency. He received 40364 votes, 40.32% of the total vote and he again became Member of Assam Legislative Assembly for Rangapara. On 6 June 2011, Tanti was elected uncontested as Deputy Speaker of Assam Legislative Assembly. There were 6 nominations from Congress and none from the opposition.

In the 2016 Assam Legislative Assembly election, Tanti sought reelection. He received 28606 votes, 24.35% of the total vote. He lost to BJP candidate Pallab Lochan Das by 22991 votes.
