= Kurmi (surname) =

Kurmi is a surname. Notable people with the surname include:

- Chinak Kurmi (fl. 2003–2008), Nepalese politician
- Dan Bahadur Kurmi (fl. 2008), Nepalese politician
- Ramesh Prasad Kurmi (fl. 2017), Nepalese politician
- Rupam Kurmi (died 2004), Indian politician
- Rupjyoti Kurmi (born 1977), Indian politician
