= Alok Kumar Ghosh =

Indian politician from Assam(died 2021)

Member of Assam Legislative Assembly
- In office 2004–2006
- Preceded by: Rupam Kurmi
- Succeeded by: Rupjyoti Kurmi
- Constituency: Mariani

Personal details
- Died: 7 August 2021 (aged 62) Siliguri
- Party: Asom Gana Parishad (2021)
- Other political affiliations: Bharatiya Janata Party (2021); Trinamool Congress (2004–2006, 2011–2016); Nationalist Congress Party (2001–2004, 2006–2011, 2016–2021)
- Children: 3
- Parent: Bholanath Ghosh (Father)

Alok Kumar Ghosh (died 7 August 2021) was an Indian politician from the state of Assam. He was a former member of Assam Legislative Assembly for Mariani.

== Early life and education ==
Ghosh was the son of Bholanath Ghosh. Ghosh passed the H.S.L.C. Exam in the year 1974 from Railway High School, Mariani, Dist. Jorhat, Assam.

== Political career ==
Ghosh was the Nationalist Congress Party candidate for Mariani in 2001. He received 16198 votes, 26.16% of the total vote. He lost to Rupam Kurmi.

Rupam Kurmi died in 2004, which led to a by-election. He was the Trinamool Congress candidate and received 18424 votes and became MLA of the constituency.

In the 2006 Assam Legislative Assembly election, he did not receive the Trinamool Congress nomination and instead again became the Nationalist Congress Party candidate. He received 30454 votes, losing to Rupjyoti Kurmi by 3017 votes.

In the 2011 Assam Legislative Assembly election, Ghosh switched back to Trinamool Congress. He received 28696 votes, 37.67% of the total vote and he lost to Rupjyoti Kurmi by 7058 votes.

In the 2016 Assam Legislative Assembly election, Ghosh went back to the Nationalist Congress party. He received 34908 votes, 38.55% of the total vote and lost to Rupjyoti Kurmi by 1793 votes.

In the 2021 Assam Legislative Assembly election, he was denied a BJP ticket so he instead filed as AGP but his nomination was later withdrawn.

== Social activities ==
Ghosh was known for his philanthropic works. He had offered cooked food to hundreds of poor people during the COVID lockdown. He ran a ‘NaMo Canteen’ in eastern Assam's Mariani from 2018 which served a full dish vegetarian meal to some 300 poor people almost every day. Daily labourers were charged Rs 8 per meal while the beggars and orphans were given the food free.

== Illness and death ==
On 11 March 2021, Ghosh fell sick and was hospitalised a few hours after his nomination papers for the assembly elections were rejected. Earlier, Ghosh had been suffering heart-related ailments and had a pacemaker installed.

On 7 August 2021, after months of illness, Ghosh died at a Siliguri hospital in West Bengal. He left behind a wife, a son and two daughters. Many politicians such as Bimal Bora, Ranoj Pegu and Sarbananda Sonowal paid tribute to him. Sonowal said “A noted social worker, his demise is a huge loss for all of us.”

On 29 August, Chief Minister Himanta Biswa Sarma visited Ghosh's house in Siliguri, to meet his family members. Sarma, along with several politicians including Ashok Singhal, Bhubaneswar Kalita and Sanjoy Kishan paid condolences in a ceremony in Ghosh's memory.
