= Mariani, Jorhat =

Mariani Mariani
- Town
- Location in Assam, India Mariani (India)
- Coordinates: 26.67°N 94.33°E
- Country: India
- State: Assam
- District: Jorhat

Government
  - Body: Mariani Municipality Board
- Elevation: 155 m (509 ft)

Population (2001)
  - Total: 23,065

Languages
  - Official: Assamese
- Time zone: UTC+5:30 (IST)
- PIN: 785634
- Telephone code: 03771
- Vehicle registration: AS 03

Mariani (IPA: ˌmɑːrɪˈænɪ) is a neighbourhood town of Jorhat, on the border of Nagaland and about 17.5 km from Jorhat Town railway station.

== Demographics ==
As of 2001 India census, Mariani had a population of 23,065. Males constitute 54% of the population and females 46%. In Mariani, 12% of the population is under 6 years of age.

== Geography ==
Mariani is located at 26.67°N 94.33°E. It has an average elevation of 155 metres (509 ft).

=== Language ===
Languages spoken in Mariani (2011)
1. Bengali (59.6%)
2. Assamese (20.9%)
3. Hindi (15.6%)
4. others (3.93%)

Bengali is the most spoken language in the town at 12,401 speakers, followed by Assamese at 4,344 and Hindi at 3,238.

== College ==
- Mariani College

== Politics ==
Mariani is part of Jorhat (Lok Sabha constituency). BJP's Rupjyoti Kurmi is the incumbent MLA of Mariani (Vidhan Sabha constituency).

In 2022 Assam municipal elections, the Independent Candidates with Mariani Unnayan Mancha won seven wards out of ten wards, reducing BJP to two in Mariani Municipal Corporation.

== Notable people ==
- Alok Kumar Ghosh, Ex-MLA of Mariani Assembly Constituency
- Anamika Choudhari, winner of Sa Re Ga Ma Pa Li'l Champs International
- Rupjyoti Kurmi, Indian politician

== Transport ==
Dhodar Ali connects Mariani by road. Mariani is well connected with Jorhat by road. Buses and mini vans (Tata Magic) are available frequently. The nearest airport of Mariani is Jorhat Airport. The town has very good railway connectivity with rest of the country. It is served by Mariani junction, one of the major railhead of Tinsukia railway division. It falls in the Lumding–Dibrugarh section.
