= Gajen Tanti =

Indian politician (1937–1999)

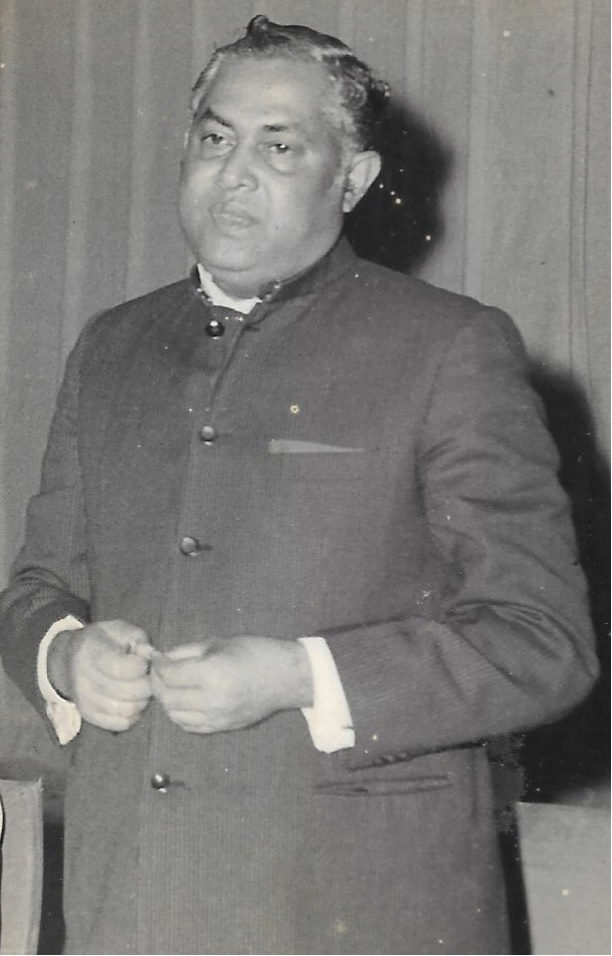
- Member of Assam Legislative Assembly Mariani Vidhan Sabha Constituency (1967 to 1983)
- Born: 12 March 1937; Mezenga Tea Estate, Titabor, Jorhat, Assam
- Died: 9 July 1999 (aged 62); Bokakhat, Golaghat, Assam
- Occupation: politics
- Political party: Nationalist Congress Party; Indian National Congress; Indian National Congress (Socialist); Indian Congress (Socialist) – Sarat Chandra Sinha
- Spouse(s): Lakhimi Tanti (m. 1963–1979) Anima Tanti (m. 1980–2013)
- Children: 3
- Parents: Arpan Tanti, (father); Dalimi Tanti (mother)

Gajen Tanti (12 March 1937 – 9 July 1999) was an Indian politician and cabinet minister of Assam (1972) from the Tea Labour Community. He was a member of Indian National Congress, Indian National Congress (Socialist) and Nationalist Congress Party.

== Early life and education ==
Gajen Tanti, also known as Gomaya Telenga, was born to Arpan Tanti in a Telenga family on 12 March 1937 in Mezenga tea estate, Titabor, Jorhat District. He completed his undergraduate education from Titabor and his higher education from J.B College, Jorhat, Assam.

== Political career ==
In 1960 Tanti became the secretary of ACMS (Assam Chah Mazdoor Sangha), Jorhat branch anonymously. He is the first secretary in the Jorhat branch from the Tea garden labor community.

Mariani assembly constituency was formed in 1967, Gajen Tanti was elected to the member legislative assembly for the first time from Mariani in 1967 from Indian national congress party. In 1971 he was elected as General Secretary ACMS central Committee at Dibrugarh. In the same year, he formed the ATEICOL (Assam Tea Employees Industrial Co-Operation) and became the first President. In 1972 he was elected to the Mariani assembly constituency for the second time. He became the first cabinet minister of Assam from the tea garden labor community in the Sarat Chandra Sinha ministry. He was entrusted with departments like Food and Civil Supply, Labour, Co-operative, Transport, Trade and Commerce, Municipality, Housing, etc. during his political tenure. Gajen Tanti was elected to the Mariyani assembly for the third time in 1978 from Indian National Congress (Socialist) since the Indian National Congress was divided in the same year.

After becoming the General Secretary of ACMS. he signed the first-ever MOU with the planters Association for the increase of labor wages. He was also instrumental in pension and gratuity implementation for the tea garden laborers. There was no student organization for tea garden workers at that time in Assam. Gajen Tanti took initiative in the form of " All Assam Tea Community Student Union " now ATTSA at Rangajan Tea estate in 1965. He became the Vice President of INTUC and a member of ILO during his lifetime.

== Personal life and death ==
On 9 July 1999 while returning from Jorhat to Guwahati in ASTC bus for a crucial meeting at Guwahati for the merger of Indian National Congress (Socialist) with Nationalist Congress Party, he died in an accident at Siljuri, 16 km away from Bokakhat. He had 3 children.
