= Kamala Prasad Agarwala =

Member of Parliament, Lok Sabha
- In office 1971–1977
- Preceded by: Bijoy Chandra Bhagavati
- Succeeded by: Purna Narayan Sinha
- Constituency: Tezpur

Personal details
- Born: 1909 Tezpur, Assam, British India
- Party: Indian National Congress

Kamala Prasad Agarwala was an Indian politician. He was elected to the Lok Sabha, the lower house of the Parliament of India, from Tezpur Lok Sabha constituency in 1971. Agarwala was Member of Assam Legislative Assembly from Tezpur Assembly constituency in the 1957 and 1962 elections and member of Assam Legislative Council (1940–1947) on the Indian National Congress ticket.
