= Dhekiajuli Assembly constituency =

Constituency of the Assam legislative assembly in India

Dhekiajuli
- Constituency No. 65 for the Assam Legislative Assembly

Constituency details
- Country: India
- Region: Northeast India
- State: Assam
- District: Sonitpur
- Lok Sabha constituency: Sonitpur
- Established: 1951
- Reservation: None

Dhekiajuli Assembly constituency is one of the 126 assembly constituencies of Assam Legislative Assembly. Dhekiajuli forms part of the Sonitpur Lok Sabha constituency.

== Members of the Legislative Assembly ==
Dhekiajuli North Assembly Constituency (1952-1957)
Election	Name	Party
1952	Omeo Kumar Das	Indian National Congress

Dhekiajuli Assembly Constituency (1957–present)
Election	Name	Party
1957	Omeo Kumar Das	Indian National Congress
1962	Omeo Kumar Das	Indian National Congress
1967	Pushpalata Das	Indian National Congress
1972	Hiranya Bora	Indian National Congress
1978	Pratap Kalita	Indian National Congress
1985	Hiranya Bora	Indian National Congress
1991	Hiranya Bora	Indian National Congress
1996	Joseph Toppo	Asom Gana Parishad
2001	Joseph Toppo	Asom Gana Parishad
2006	Joseph Toppo	Asom Gana Parishad
2009 ^	Bhimananda Tanti	Indian National Congress
2011	Habul Chakraborty	Indian National Congress
2016	Ashok Singhal	Bharatiya Janata Party
2021	Ashok Singhal	Bharatiya Janata Party

Following are details on Dhekiajuli Assembly constituency-

- Country: India.
- State: Assam.
- District: Sonitpur district .
- Lok Sabha Constituency: Tezpur Lok Sabha/Parliamentary constituency.
- Assembly Categorisation: Rural constituency.
- Literacy Level:81.66%.
- Eligible Electors as per 2021 General Elections: 2,17,380 Eligible Electors. Male Electors:1,10,867 . Female Electors: 1,06,511 .
- Geographic Co-Ordinates: 26°49'05.2"N 92°28'06.6"E.
- Total Area Covered: 748 square kilometres.
- Area Includes: Dhekiajuli thana (excluding Barchalla and Borgaon mouzas) in Tezpur sub-division, of Sonitpur district of Assam:.
- Inter State Border :Sonitpur.
- Number Of Polling Stations: Year 2011-232, Year 2016-233, Year 2021-71.

== Assembly election results ==
2011 Assam Legislative Assembly election: Dhekiajuli
Party	Candidate	Votes	%	±%
INC	Habul Chakraborty			
AGP				
AIUDF				
Independent				
Independent				
Independent				
Independent				
Independent				
Independent				
NOTA	None of the above			
Majority		34,995	24.28	
Turnout		1,44,080	82.23	
Registered electors		1,75,210		
INC gain from		Swing		

2016 Assam Legislative Assembly election: Dhekiajuli
Party	Candidate	Votes	%	±%
BJP	Ashok Singhal	71,425	49.57	
INC	Habul Chakraborty	36,430	25.29	
AIUDF	Dhaniram Rajowar	16,690	11.58	
Independent	Benudhar Nath	8,142	5.65	
Independent	Ranjay Basumatary	2,972	2.06	
Independent	Jahirul Islam	2,164	1.50	
Independent	Satrughna Sasoni	1,603	1.11	
Independent	Mohan Nag	1,159	0.80	
Independent	Manoranjan Daimary	1,127	0.78	
NOTA	None of the above	2,368	1.64	
Majority		34,995	24.28	
Turnout		1,44,080	82.23	
Registered electors		1,75,210		
BJP gain from INC		Swing		

2021 Assam Legislative Assembly Election
Party	Candidate	Votes	%	±%
BJP	Ashok Singhal			
AGP				
AIUDF				
Independent				
Independent				
Independent				
Independent				
Independent				
Independent				
NOTA	None of the above			
Majority		34,995	24.28	
Turnout		1,44,080	82.23	
Registered electors		1,75,210		
BJP gain from		Swing		

=== 2026 ===
2026 Assam Legislative Assembly election: Dhekiajuli
Party	Candidate	Votes	%	±%
BJP	Ashok Singhal	111880	59.63	
INC	Batash Urang	63711	33.96	
Independent	ANSUMA BASUMATARY	4983	2.66	
Voters Party International	RANJOY BASUMATARY	1957	1.04	
NOTA	NOTA	2292	1.22	
Margin of victory		48169		
Turnout		187633		
Rejected ballots				
Registered electors				
BJP hold		Swing		

== Parliamentary election results ==
=== 2016 ===
2016 Assam Legislative Assembly election: Dhekiajuli
Party	Candidate	Votes	%	±%
BJP	Ashok Singhal	71,425	49.57	
INC	Habul Chakraborty	36,430	25.29	
AIUDF	Dhaniram Rajowar	16,690	11.58	
Independent	Benudhar Nath	8,142	5.65	
Independent	Ranjay Basumatary	2,972	2.06	
Independent	Jahirul Islam	2,164	1.50	
Independent	Satrughna Sasoni	1,603	1.11	
Independent	Mohan Nag	1,159	0.80	
Independent	Manoranjan Daimary	1,127	0.78	
NOTA	None of the above	2,368	1.64	
Majority		34,995	24.28	
Turnout		1,44,080	82.23	
Registered electors		1,75,210		
BJP gain from INC		Swing		
