= Purna Narayan Sinha =

Indian politician

Member of Parliament, Lok Sabha
- In office 1977–1980
- Preceded by: Kamala Prasad Agarwala
- Succeeded by: Bipinpal Das
- Constituency: Tezpur

Personal details
- Born: October 18, 1916 Tezpur, Assam, British India
- Died: 25 January 2001
- Party: Janata Party
- Other political affiliations: Praja Socialist Party, Assam Gana Parishad
- Spouse: C. B. Sinha

Purna Narayan Sinha was an Indian politician.He was the founder of Bhartiya Koch-Rajbangshi Khatriya Mahashava (BKRKM) .He was elected to the Lok Sabha, the lower house of the Parliament of India, as a member of the Janata Party.
