= Maral gaon =

Village in Assam, India

- Village
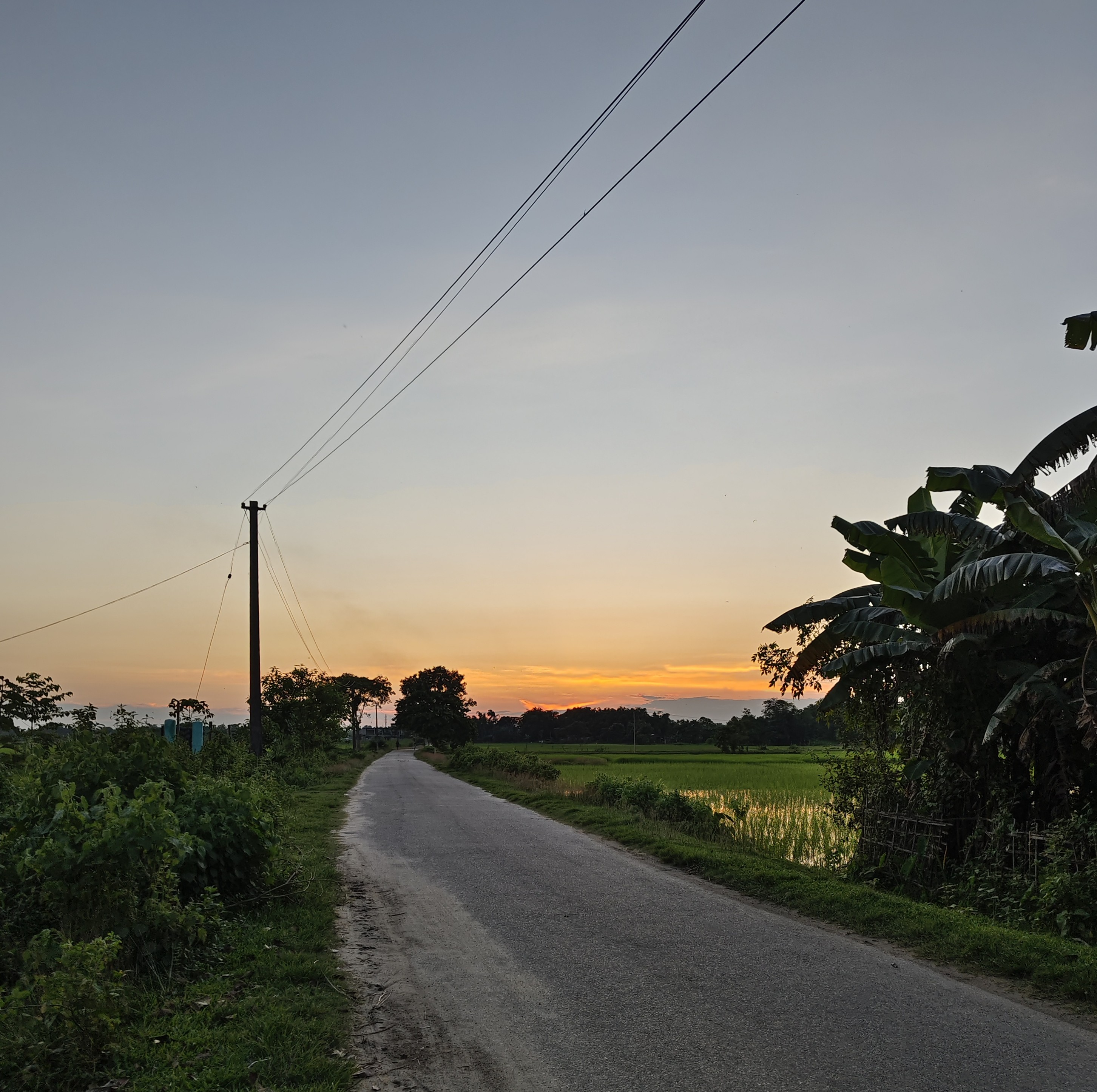
- A road in Maral Gaon

- Location in Assam, India Maral gaon (India)
- Coordinates: 26.74°N 93.18°E
- Country: India
- State: Assam
- District: Biswanath district
- Sub-Division: Biswanath

Government
  - Type: Panchayat
  - Body: Burigang Erabari Gram Panchayat

Population (2011)
  - Total: 1,592
- Time zone: UTC+5.30 (IST)
- PIN: 784176

Maral gaon is a village in the Biswanath district (Note: Sonitpur district was bifurcated to Sonitpur and Biswanath district in 2016.) of the Indian state of Assam. It is one of 392 villages within the Biswanath subdivision and covers an area of 333 hectares. The 2011 Census of India indicated that a significant proportion of the village's population belongs to the Scheduled Caste category. Administratively, Maral Gaon falls under the jurisdiction of the Burigang Erabari Gram Panchayat, which is a part of the Biswanath Anchalik Panchayat.

== Demographics ==
As of the 2011 Census of India, the village had a population of 1,592, with a sex ratio of 1002 females per 1000 males. The literacy rate of the village was 82.85%. There were 341 households in the village.

The Scheduled Caste (SC) and Scheduled Tribe (ST) populations accounted for approximately 57.4% and 0.8% of the total population, respectively.

== Geography ==
It is geographically located at 26.74°N 93.18°E. The village covers a total area of 333 hectares. The Permanent Location Code Number (PLCN) assigned to Maral Gaon by the 2001 and 2011 Censuses are 01190400 and 286642, respectively.

== Governance ==
Maral Gaon is governed by the Burigang Erabari Gram Panchayat, which itself falls under the Biswanath Anchalik Panchayat. The village belongs to the Biswanath sub-district of the Biswanath district.

== See also ==
- Biswanath Chariali
- Gelapukhuri
- Gohpur
- Sonitpur district
- Tezpur
