= Ranjit Dutta =

Indian politician

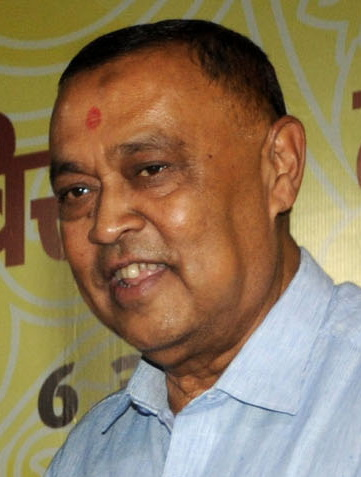
- Dutta in 2017

Member of Parliament, Lok Sabha
- Incumbent
- Assumed office 4 June 2024
- Preceded by: Pallab Lochan Das
- Constituency: Sonitpur

Cabinet Minister, Assam
- In office 24 May 2016 – 10 May 2021
- Chief Minister: Sarbananda Sonowal
- Departments: Handloom, Textiles and Sericulture; Irrigation (2016–18); Welfare of Minorities (2018–21)
- Preceded by: Bismita Gogoi (Handloom); Chandan Kumar Sarkar (Irrigation); Sarbananda Sonowal (Minorities)
- Succeeded by: Urkhao Gwra Brahma (Handloom); Bhabesh Kalita (Irrigation); Chandra Mohan Patowary (Minorities)

President, Assam Pradesh Bharatiya Janata Party
- In office 2010–2012
- Succeeded by: Sarbananda Sonowal

Member, Assam Legislative Assembly
- In office 19 May 2016 – 4 June 2024
- Preceded by: Pallab Lochan Das
- Constituency: Behali
- In office 13 May 2001 – 13 May 2011
- Succeeded by: Pallab Lochan Das
- Constituency: Behali

Personal details
- Born: 24 January 1957 (age 69) Hatibondha, Biswanath district, Assam
- Party: Bharatiya Janata Party
- Spouse: Gita Dutta (m. 1991)
- Parent(s): Kuladhar Dutta (Father); Labanya Dutta (Mother)
- Education: Darrang College

Ranjit Dutta (born 24 January 1957) is an Indian politician from the state of Assam. He is presently a Member of Parliament (Lok Sabha) since 2024. He was a minister in the Sarbananda Sonowal-led government of Assam from 2016 to 2021.

== Early life and education ==
Dutta was born in Hatibondha, Biswanath. His father was Kuladhar Dutta and his mother was Labanya Dutta. He completed Darrang College, Tezpur in 1974.

== Political career ==
Dutta served as an MLA of Behali Assembly constituency representing the Bharatiya Janata Party from 2001 to 2011 and for another two terms in 2016 and 2021 before he resigned and contested the Lok Sabha elections in 2024.

In 2001, he obtained 33,348 votes, 50.65% of the total vote in the election. He defeated the incumbent Indian National Congress MLA, Barnabash Tanti, who had been serving for the past 10 years, by 13,529 votes.

He retained the seat in the 2006 Assam Legislative Assembly election. He polled 28,633 votes and defeated his nearest opponent, a Congress candidate, by 8979 votes.

In the 2011 Assam Legislative Assembly election, he received 22662 votes, 28.02% of the total vote, but lost to Congress candidate and future Lok Sabha MP Pallab Lochan Das, by 18136 votes.

In the 2016 Assam Legislative Assembly election, he regained the Behali seat as a BJP candidate. He received 52152 votes, 56.2% of the total vote and defeated his nearest opponent, a congress candidate, by 23601 votes.

He was inducted into the Sonowal cabinet as minister for handloom, welfare of minorities, textiles and sericulture. He was sworn in as a cabinet minister on 24 May 2016 at Guwahati.

In the 2021 Assam Legislative Assembly election, he sought reelection. He received 53583 votes, 50.93% of the total vote. He defeated his nearest opponent by 29839 votes. He was not inducted into the Sarma Ministry.

In 2024, he won from the Sonitpur Lok Sabha constituency representing the Bharatiya Janata Party.

== Personal life ==
Dutta married Gita Dutta on 1 May 1991. They have one son and one daughter.
