= Ram Prasad Sharma =

Indian politician

Ram Prasad Sarmah

Member of parliament for Tezpur
- In office 16 May 2014 to 23 May 2019
- Preceded by: Joseph Toppo
- Succeeded by: Pallab Lochan Das

Personal details
- Born: 14 February 1955 (age 71) Behali, Sonitpur District (Assam)
- Party: Indian National Congress (2020–present)
- Other political affiliations: BJP (Till 2020)
- Spouse: Ganga Sarmah
- Children: 1 daughter
- Profession: Lawyer

Ram Prasad Sarmah is an Indian National Congress Assam Pradesh politician from Assam. In 2014, he contested election on a Bharatiya Janata Party ticket from Tezpur (Lok Sabha) constituency. He is the current President of Assam Gorkha Sammelan. He is an advocate at the Gauhati High Court, and has been fielded as the candidate from the Tezpur constituency by his party in the 2014 Indian general election which he won. He did his Bachelor of Laws from Tura Law College between 1980 and 1981 and Bachelor of Arts from Mendipathar College in 1976.
