= Bipinpal Das =

Indian politician

Member of Parliament, Rajya Sabha
- In office 1970–1982
- Constituency: Assam

Member of Parliament, Lok Sabha
- In office 1984-1989
- Preceded by: Purna Narayan Sinha
- Succeeded by: Swarup Upadhyay
- Constituency: Tezpur, Assam

Personal details
- Born: 1 February 1923
- Died: 26 July 2005 (aged 82)
- Party: Indian National Congress
- Spouse: Arati Das

Bipinpal Das (1923-2005) was an Indian politician belonging to the Indian National Congress. He was elected to the Lok Sabha, lower house of the Parliament of India from the Tezpur Assam and he was earlier a member of the Rajya Sabha the Upper house of the Parliament of India. He was the Union Deputy Minister of External Affairs (India) in Second Indira Gandhi ministry. He was also the Principal of Darrang College.
