= Prabin Hazarika =

Indian politician

Member of Assam Legislative Assembly
- In office 1996–2001
- Constituency: Biswanath
- In office 2011–2016

Personal details
- Party: Asom Gana Parishad

Prabin Hazarika is an Asom Gana Parishad politician from Assam, India. He has been elected in Assam Legislative Assembly election in 1996 and 2011 from Biswanath.
