= Behali Assembly constituency =

Constituency of the Assam legislative assembly in India

Behali
- Constituency No. 71 for the Assam Legislative Assembly

Constituency details
- Country: India
- Region: Northeast India
- State: Assam
- District: Biswanath
- Lok Sabha constituency: Sonitpur
- Established: 1978
- Reservation: SC

Member of Legislative Assembly
- 16th Assam Legislative Assembly
- Incumbent Munindra Das
- Party: Bhartiya Janta Party
- Alliance: National Democratic Alliance
- Elected year: 2026 Assam Legislative Assembly election

Behali Assembly constituency is one of the 126 assembly constituencies of Assam Legislative Assembly. Behali forms part of the Sonitpur Lok Sabha constituency.

This constituency is reserved for the Scheduled Caste candidates since 2023.

== Town details ==
- Country: India
- State: Assam
- District: Biswanath district
- Lok Sabha Constituency: Sonitpur Lok Sabha constituency
- Area Includes: Behali Dev Block, Baghmora Dev. Block (Part), Biswanath Dev. Block (Part), Chaiduar Dev. Block (Part).

== Members of Legislative Assembly ==
Election	Name	Party
1978	Bishnulal Upadhyaya	Indian National Congress
1985	Swarup Upadhyay	Indian National Congress
1991	Barnabash Tanti	Indian National Congress
1996	Barnabash Tanti	Indian National Congress
2001	Ranjit Dutta	Bharatiya Janata Party
2006	Ranjit Dutta	Bharatiya Janata Party
2011	Pallab Lochan Das	Indian National Congress
2016	Ranjit Dutta	Bharatiya Janata Party
2021	Ranjit Dutta	Bharatiya Janata Party
2024^	Diganta Ghatowal	Bharatiya Janata Party
2026	Munindra Das	Bharatiya Janata Party

^ denotes by-election

== Election results ==
=== 2026 ===
2026 Assam Legislative Assembly election: Behali
Party	Candidate	Votes	%	±%
BJP	Munindra Das	87224	65.86	▲15.25
CPI(ML)L	Gyanendra Sarkar	26521	20.03	▲14.97
Independent	Ajoy Kumar Singha	13294	10.04	
Gana Suraksha Party	Paban Pran Rabidas	1999	1.51	
NOTA	None of the above	3397	3	▲1.5
Margin of victory		60703	45.84	▲36.83
Turnout		132435		31.56
BJP hold		Swing	▲15.25	

=== 2024 by-election ===
Assam Legislative Assembly by-election 2024: Behali
Party	Candidate	Votes	%	±%
BJP	Diganta Ghatowal	50,947	50.61	−0.23
INC	Jayanta Borah	41,896	41.62	
CPI(ML)L	Lakhi Kanta Kurmi	5,093	5.06	−15.40
AAP	Ananta Gogoi	1,217	1.21	
NOTA	None of the above	1,514	1.50	−1.36
Majority		9,051	9.01	
Turnout		1,00,667		
BJP hold		Swing		

=== 2021 ===
2021 Assam Legislative Assembly election: Behali
Party	Candidate	Votes	%	±%
BJP	Ranjit Dutta	53,583	50.93	
Independent	Jayanta Borah	23,744	22.57	
CPI(ML)L	Bibek Das	21,531	20.46	
AJP	Anjan Upadhyaya	3,343	3.18	
NOTA	None of the above	3,012	2.86	N/A
Majority		23,601		
Turnout		105213		
Registered electors				
BJP hold		Swing		

=== 2016 ===
2016 Assam Legislative Assembly election: Behali
Party	Candidate	Votes	%	±%
BJP	Ranjit Dutta	52,152	56.20	+28.18
INC	Rupak Sarma	28,551	30.76	−19.68
CPI(ML)L	Bibek Das	8,025	8.64	−7.17
Independent	Zulfikar Hussain	1,573	1.69	N/A
NOTA	None of the above	2,495	2.68	N/A
Majority		23,601	25.44	+3.02
Turnout		92,796	86.20	+4.48
Registered electors		1,07,643		
BJP gain from INC		Swing		

=== 2011 ===
2011 Assam Legislative Assembly election: Behali
Party	Candidate	Votes	%	±%
INC	Pallab Lochan Das	40,798	50.44	
BJP	Ranjit Dutta	22,662	28.02	
CPI(ML)L	Bibek Das	12,784	15.81	
Independent	Biswajeet Goswami	3,307	4.09	
AIUDF	Malay Das	1,330	1.64	
Majority		18,136	22.42	
Turnout		80,881	81.72	
Registered electors		98,977		
INC gain from BJP		Swing		
