= Amiya Kumar Bhuyan =

Indian politician

Member of Assam Legislative Assembly
- Incumbent
- Assumed office 21 May 2021
- Preceded by: Debananda Hazarika
- Constituency: Bihpuria (Vidhan Sabha constituency)

Personal details
- Party: Bharatiya Janata Party
- Profession: Politician

Amiya Kumar Bhuyan is an Indian politician from the state of Assam. He was elected to the Assam Legislative Assembly from Bihpuria (Vidhan Sabha constituency) in the 2021 Assam Legislative Assembly election as a member of the Bharatiya Janata Party.

== Early life and education ==
Amiya Kumar Bhuyan was born in the Badulati village of Lakhimpur district, Assam. He completed his master's in Political Science from Guwahati University in 1992. In 2002, he completed his master's in law from Guwahati University. He got his Ph.D. from Guwahati University in 2006.
