= Bhupen Kumar Borah =

Indian politician

Member of the Assam Legislative Assembly
- Incumbent
- Assumed office 2026
- Preceded by: Amiya Kumar Bhuyan
- Constituency: Bihpuria
- In office 2006–2016
- Preceded by: Premadhar Bora
- Succeeded by: Debananda Hazarika
- Constituency: Bihpuria

President of Assam Pradesh Congress Committee
- In office 24 July 2021 – 26 May 2025
- President: Mallikarjun Kharge
- Preceded by: Ripun Bora
- Succeeded by: Gaurav Gogoi

Personal details
- Born: 30 October 1970 (age 55) Lakhimpur, Assam, India
- Party: Bharatiya Janata Party (2026–present)
- Other political affiliations: Indian National Congress (1994–2026)
- Spouse: Mousumi Borgohain Borah
- Children: 2 sons
- Education: North Lakhimpur College; Dibrugarh University
- Profession: Politician

Bhupen Kumar Borah (born 30 October 1970) is an Indian politician from Assam presently affiliated with the Bharatiya Janata Party (BJP). He currently represents the Bihpuria constituency in the Assam Legislative Assembly as a member of the BJP since May 2026. Before joining the BJP, he was one of the leading figures of the Indian National Congress (INC) in Assam, and he even occupied the office of the president of the Assam Pradesh Congress Committee from 2021 to 2025. Previously, he also served two-terms as a member of the Assam Legislative Assembly representing Bihpuria from 2006 to 2016 as a member of the INC.

== Early life ==
Bhupen Borah was born on 30 October 1970 in Pohumora, Lakhimpur, Assam. He graduated from North Lakhimpur College and Dibrugarh University. He was vice-president of North Lakhimpur College Students' Union and general secretary of Dibrugarh University Postgraduate Students' Union.

== Political career ==
Borah was president of the Assam Pradesh Youth Congress. He was elected to the Assam Legislative Assembly from Bihpuria in 2006, and re-elected in 2011. He was a spokesperson and parliamentary secretary for the Government of Assam during Tarun Gogoi’s tenure as Chief Minister. In 2013, he was appointed a secretary of the All India Congress Committee. In 2021, he was appointed president of the Assam Pradesh Congress Committee.
