= Rangapara Assembly constituency =

Rangapara
- Constituency No. 68 for the Assam Legislative Assembly

Constituency details
- Country: India
- Region: Northeast India
- State: Assam
- District: Sonitpur
- Lok Sabha constituency: Sonitpur
- Established: 1978
- Reservation: None

Rangapara Assembly constituency is one of the 126 state legislative assembly constituencies in the Indian state of Assam, in Northeast India. Rangapara is also part of Sonitpur Lok Sabha constituency.

Most successful parties from Rangapara Vidhan Sabha:
1. INC (7 times) (63.0%)
2. BJP (4 times) (37.0%)
3. Janata Party (0 times) (0.00%)

== Members of Legislative Assembly ==
Year	Winner	Party
Tezpur North Constituency(1952-1957)
1952	Biswadev Sarmah	Indian National Congress
Balipara Assembly Constituency(1957-1978)
1957	Biswadev Sarmah	Indian National Congress
1962	Biswadev Sarmah	Indian National Congress
1967	Biswadev Sarmah	Indian National Congress
1972	Golok Rajbanshi	Indian National Congress

Rangapara Assembly Constituency(1978 till date)

Election	Name	Party
1978	Golok Rajbanshi (Note: Minister of Electricity, Mines, Parliamentary Affairs, Animal husbandry in Keshab Chandra Gogoi ministry.)	Indian National Congress
1983	Golok Rajbanshi	Indian National Congress
1985	Golok Rajbanshi (Note: Leader of the Opposition in Assam Legislative Assembly)	Indian National Congress
1991	Golok Rajbanshi (Note: Minister of Public Works Department and Parliamentary Affairs in Second Saikia Ministry.)	Indian National Congress
1996	Bhimananda Tanti	Indian National Congress
2001	Bhimananda Tanti	Indian National Congress
2006	Abhijit Hazarika	Bharatiya Janata Party
2011	Bhimananda Tanti (Note: Deputy Speaker of Assam Legislative Assembly)	Indian National Congress
2016	Pallab Lochan Das (Note: Minister of Labour Welfare (Independent Charge) and Minister of State in Department of Power, Education, Revenue and Disaster Management in Sonowal ministry.)	Bharatiya Janata Party
2019^	Rajen Borthakur	Bharatiya Janata Party
2021	Krishna Kamal Tanti	Bharatiya Janata Party

== Election results ==
=== 2026 ===
2026 Assam Legislative Assembly election: Rangapara
Party	Candidate	Votes	%	±%
BJP	Krishna Kamal Tanti	81022	56.33	
INC	Kartik Chandra Kurmi	37707	26.22	
JMM	MATHEW TOPNO	20067	13.95	
NOTA	NOTA	1853	1.29	
Margin of victory		43315		
Turnout		143822		
Rejected ballots				
Registered electors				
BJP hold		Swing		

=== 2021 ===
2021 Assam Legislative Assembly election: Rangapara
Party	Candidate	Votes	%	±%
BJP	Krishna Kamal Tanti			
INC	Abhijit Hazarika			
Majority				
Turnout				
Registered electors				
BJP win				

== See also ==
- List of constituencies of Assam Legislative Assembly
