= Biswanath Chariali =

Biswanath
- City
- Biswanath
- Location in Assam, India Biswanath (India)
- Coordinates: 26°43′40″N 93°09′06″E
- Country: India
- State: Assam
- District: Biswanath

Government
  - Body: Biswanath Chariali Municipality Board

Area
  - Total: 6.02 km^{2} (2.32 sq mi)

Population (2017)
  - Total: 37,456
  - Density: 6,220/km^{2} (16,100/sq mi)
- Time zone: UTC+5:30 (IST)
- Postal code: 784 XXX
- Telephone code: +91 - (0) 3 - XX XX XXX
- Vehicle registration: AS-32

Biswanath (Pron: ˌbɪswəˈnɑːθ ˈtʃɑːrɪˌælɪ) is a small city and a municipal board in Biswanath district in the state of Assam, India. This city is the district headquarters of Biswanath district, which was created on 15 August 2015. It derives its name from Biswanath Ghat.

== History ==
Biswanath has a very important historical significance. The river Bharali located west of Biswanarh formed the borders between Baro Bhuyans territories and Chutiya kingdom, and later between Koch kingdom and Ahom kingdom. Ruins of fort like Pratappura, Buroi, etc. still exist which were built by Chutia kings.

== Demographics ==
As of 2011 India census, Biswanath Chariali had a population of 19,145. Males constitute 51% of the population and females 49%. As per 2001 census, Biswanath Chariali has an average literacy rate of 80%, higher than the national average of 59.5%; with male literacy of 85% and female literacy of 75%. 9% of the population is under 6 years of age.

=== Language ===
Languages spoken in Biswanath Chariali (2011)
1. Assamese (49.6%)
2. Bengali (27.0%)
3. Hindi (17.9%)
4. others (5.53%)

Assamese is the most spoken language at 9,491 speakers, followed by Bengali at 5,162 people and Hindi at 3,434.

== Local sights ==
=== Biswanath Ghat ===
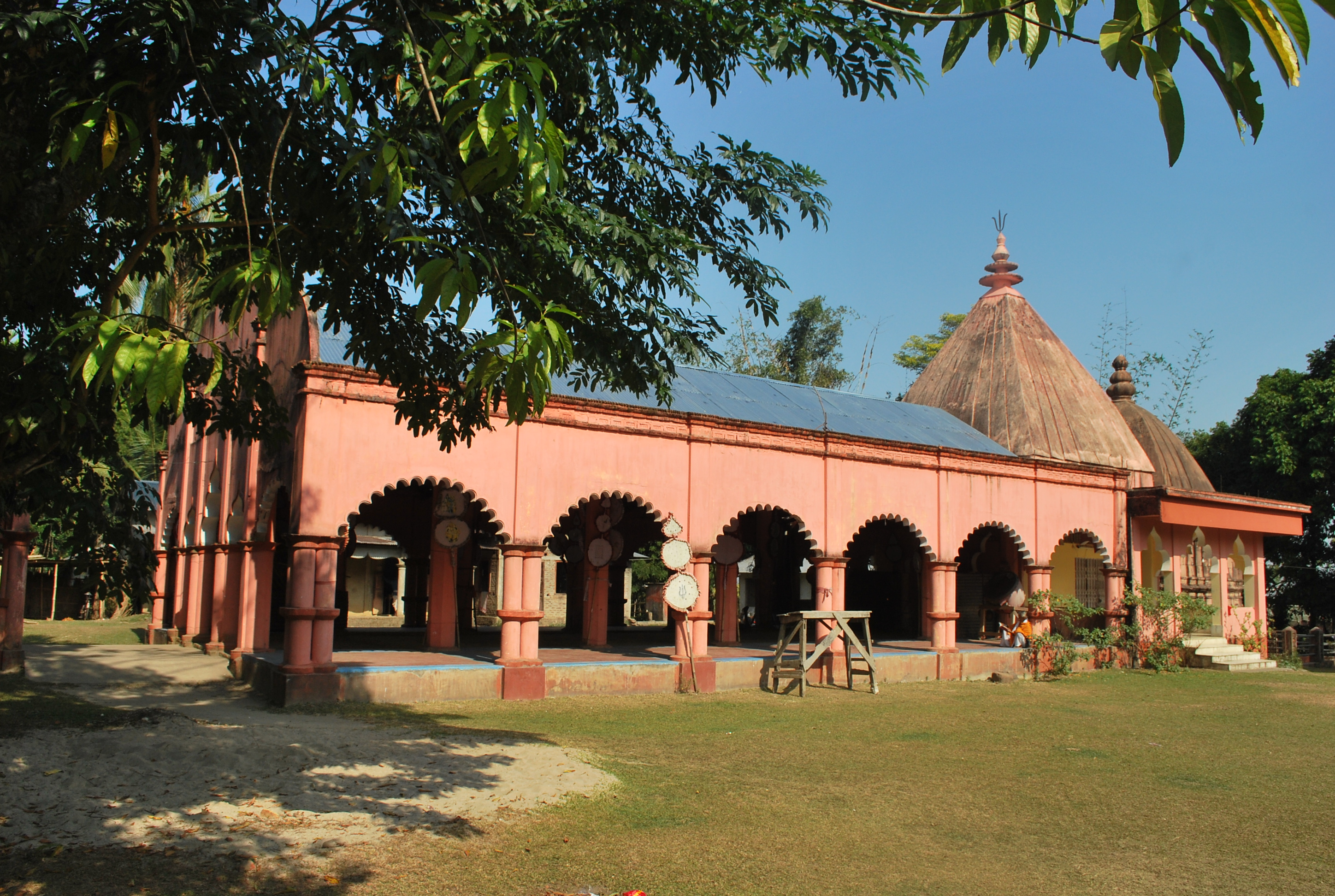
The Biswanath Temple

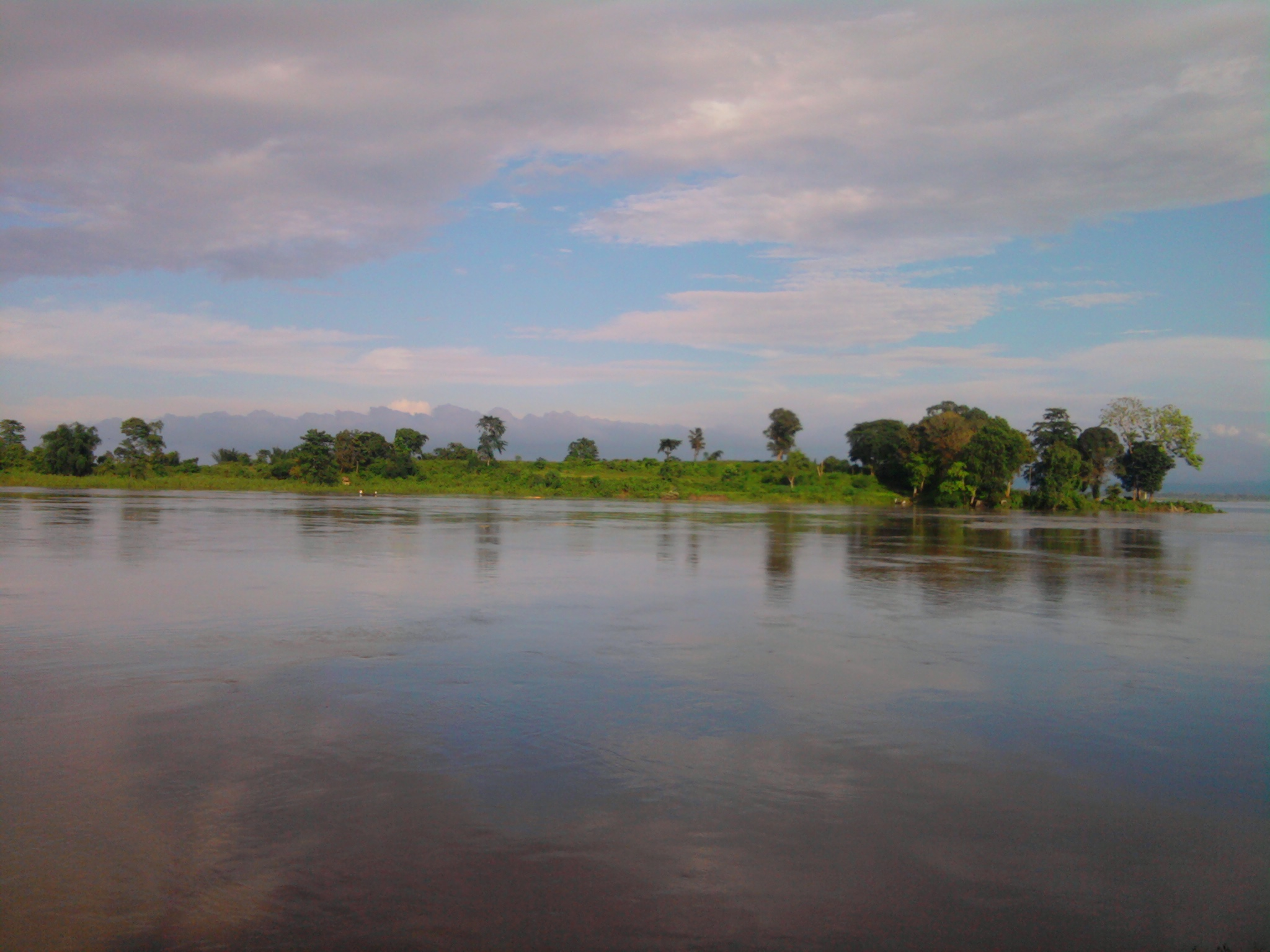
Island of Umatumuni

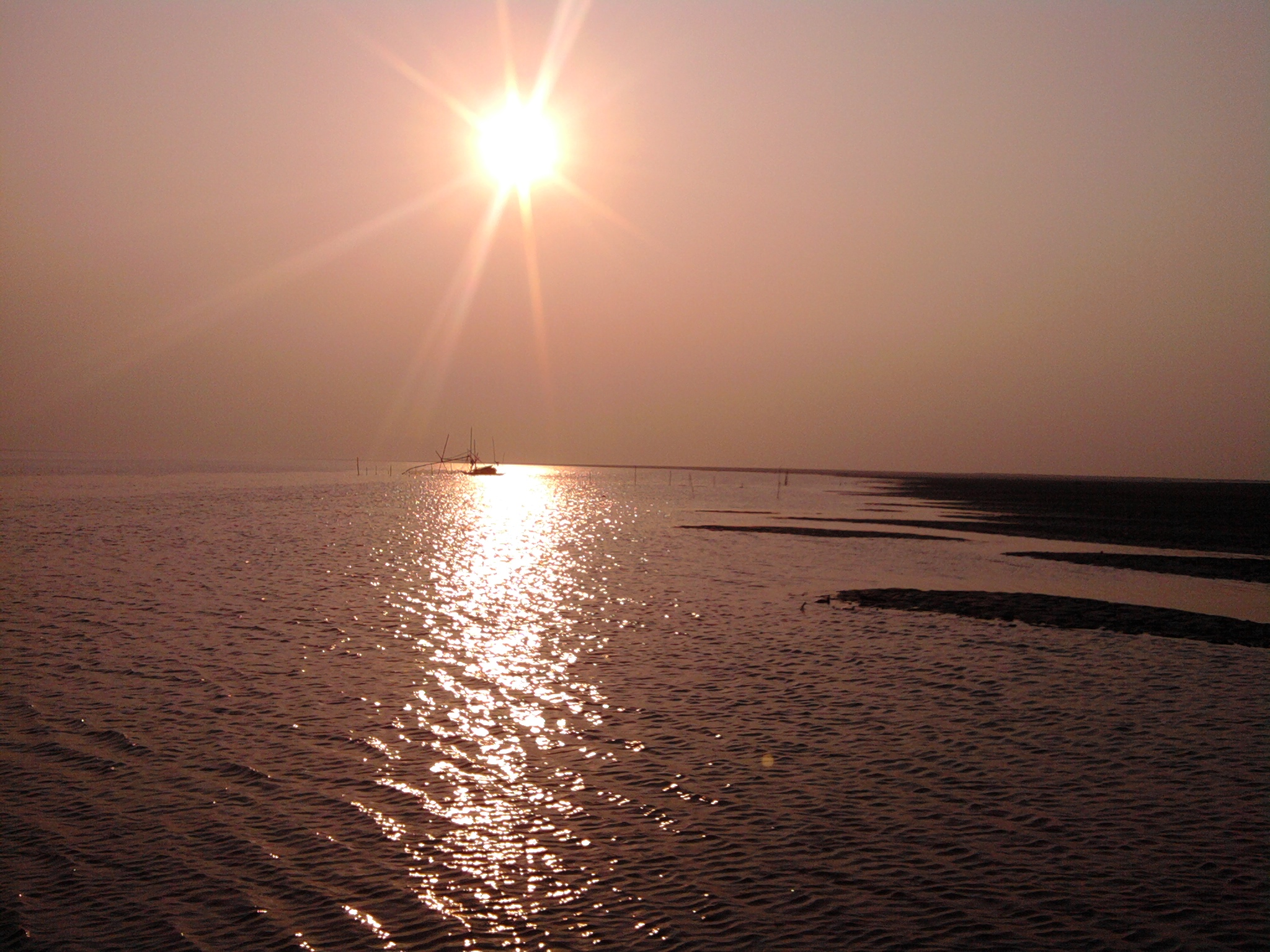
A view of sunset from Biswanath Ghat

Beyond Biswanath Chariali, towards south, there is Biswanath Ghat, also called popularly as "Gupta Kashi". The town is named after the ancient Biswanath mandir. It is called Gupta Kashi, in comparison with Kashi during the golden rule of the Guptas apart from this there is one more believe that since Banasur had built this place secretly from Lord Shiva to surprise Him, that is why it is known as Gupta(In Assamese Gupta means secretly) Kashi. Going by popular sayings, Kashi was home to temple of 330 million gods. The ghat has a cluster of temples of different gods. A Siva temple also called Pani Biswanath is located at the confluence of Bridhaganga (Burigonga) river with Brahmaputra. But now what is left is just the stone posts, beams and other ruins. During the summer the temple remains under water. Only in winter worship is done by constructing temporary shed which draws lot of tourists. On the third day of Assamese Bihu a mela is held at a place called Pani Bharal. The deity is taken from Biswnath Ghat to this place for a day and returns to Ghat there. The mela is celebrated to commemorate the Guxai Bihu festival. Another Siva temple was built in higher ground. But it submerged under ground during the great earthquake of 1897. It could only be partly raised by engineers. The current Biswanath temple had been built in lieu of it. One can visit from here the island of Umatumuni, an archaeologically famous place. Then there is the Siva dol in reverence of God Siva, built by Ban, the king of Tezpur of Hari Harar Yudha fame.

Apart from its historical religious importance, Biswanath Ghat was also a river port (Ghat) of inland water transport service started established by the British in the 19th century. Even now Biswanath Ghat is used as a port by various merchant and cargo vessels sailing across river Brahmaputra.

A lamp post was also erected in the river Brahmaputra to serve as a navigational aid for the ferry and vessels. After a glorious existence of around 170 years, this lamp post was washed away by the speedy currents of the river Brahmaputra.

=== Nagsankar Mandir ===
The Nagsankar is a Temple of Lord Shiva situated at Nagshankar village 15 km from Biswanath Chariali on National Highway 15. This temple is said to have been built in the 4th century AD. "Nagsankar" temple premises includes a beautiful pond with tortoises who respond to the name "Mohan". Feeding the tortoises is a refreshing experience for the visitors. Marriages are often solemnised in this temple.

=== Gang mou than ===
Another noteworthy place for visit in this town is the "Gang Mou Than". The great vaishnavite scholar Srimanta Sankardeva is believed to have stayed in this place after crossing the Brahmaputra due scare from enemies. For people visiting other archaeological sites of Biswanath and Gohpur area, Biswanath Chariali provides the base. The Eco-Tourist resort in Biswanth Ghat named after "Green Ashiyana" completed its construction and is a point of attraction in addition with the food facilities. Moreover, one needs to cross the Brahmaputra in order to get access to this resort on the Uma Tumoni Island.

=== Biswanath multimodal waterways terminal ===
Biswanath multimodal waterways terminal on Brahmaputra National Waterway 2 in Biswanath Chariali is part of Bharatmala and Sagarmala projects. There are 19 National Waterways for the Northeast connectivity.

== Economy ==
This city is surrounded by lush green tea gardens like Monabarie, Pertubghar, Sakomatha, Nilpur, Pavoi, Kalapani, Ginjia, Ketela, Bihali, Helem, Gohpur, Borgong, Dholie, Mijikajan, and Majuliegarh.

== Politics ==
Biswanath Chariali is a part of Tezpur (Lok Sabha constituency). and 76 No. Biswanath Legislative Assembly. Biswanath Chariali is currently represented by Promod Borthakur (Term : 2021–2026) in the Assam Legislative Assembly while it is represented by Pallab Lochan Das (Term : 2019–2024) in the Lok Sabha.

== Education ==
There are Institutions of professional education, Biswanath College of Agriculture affiliated to Assam Agricultural University, Farm Machinery Training & Testing Institute under Ministry of Agriculture, Co operation and Farmers Welfare, Govt. of India. It has a Farm Machinery Institution to give training of Farm Machines. Biswanath College is the premier college of the town. It also has a Jawahar Navodaya Vidyalaya School. Three CBSE schools, Biswanath Jnan Bharati in Madhupur and East Indian school in Nabapur including Jawahar Navodaya Vidyalaya. Some good SEBA private schools include Little star school, Sankardev Vidya Niketan, St Xavier's School, Adarsha Vidyapith etc. It has many government SEBA schools like Bahumukhi Vidyalaya (known as boys higher secondary), Chariali Academy etc.

== Healthcare ==
A full-fledged civil hospital, run by the state government is there in Biswanath Chariali. There are reputed hospitals in Biswanath Chariali and they provide high class service to the patients. Bora's Nursing Home, JK Hospital, KP Memorial Hospital, Sanjeevani Hospital, Baruah Eye Hospital, Netralaya Eye Care Clinic are the famous hospitals of Biswanath.

== Culture ==
Biswanath Chariali is a culturally rich city. A non-profit non-government organization organizes an annual one act play competition called Late Surya Borah Memorial One Act Play Competitions. There is one movie-theater hall in the town and a community hall for other cultural activities. Binapani Natya Mandir has been the centre of cultural activities for decades.

Biswanath Chariali has been hosting Surya Bora One Act Play competition for many years. Binapani Natya Mandir has been the centre of activities related to art and culture. The town has contributed to Assamese Cinema also. Central Namghar has contributed towards spreading Srimanta Sankardevs'works in fine arts.

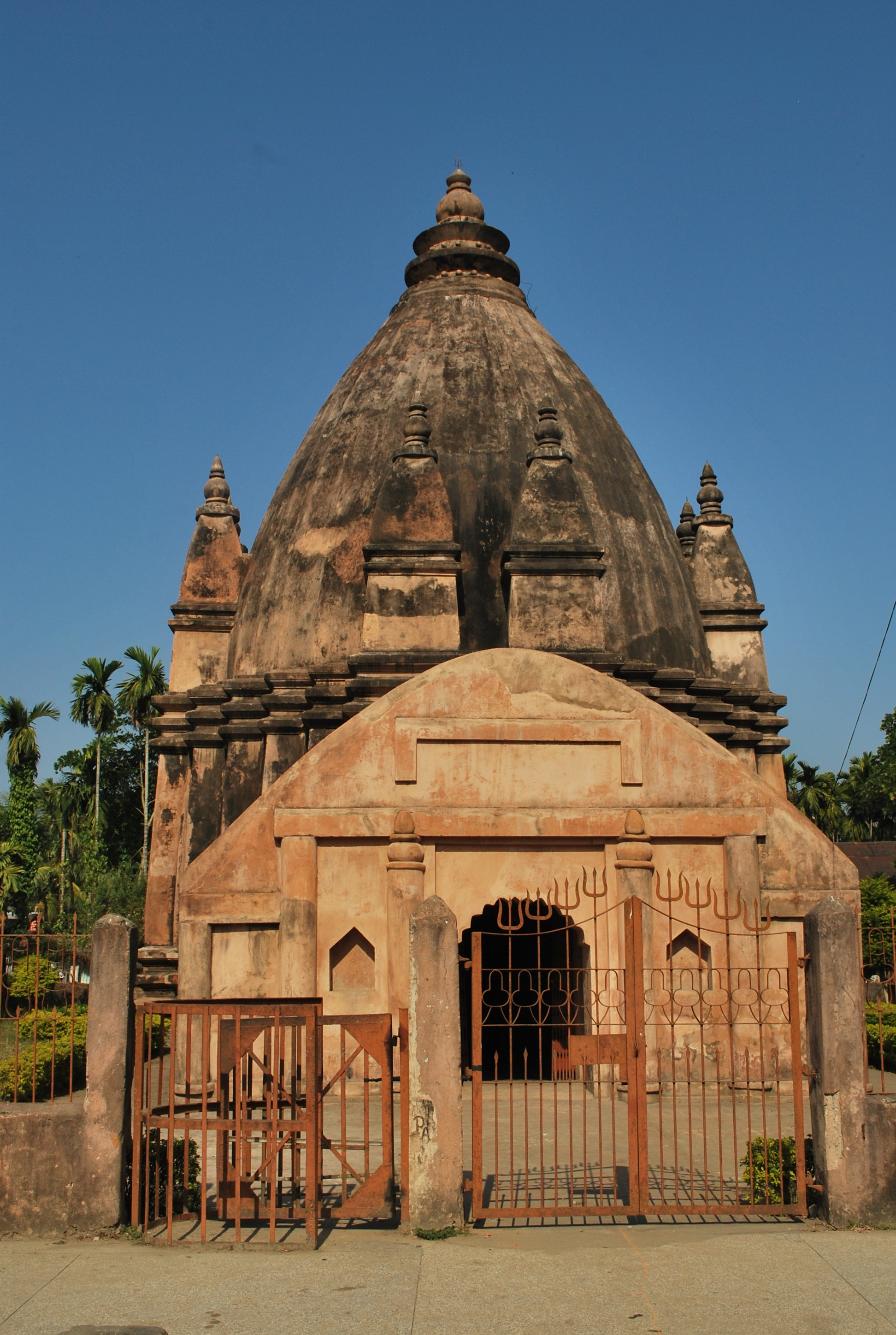
Sivadoul at Biswanath

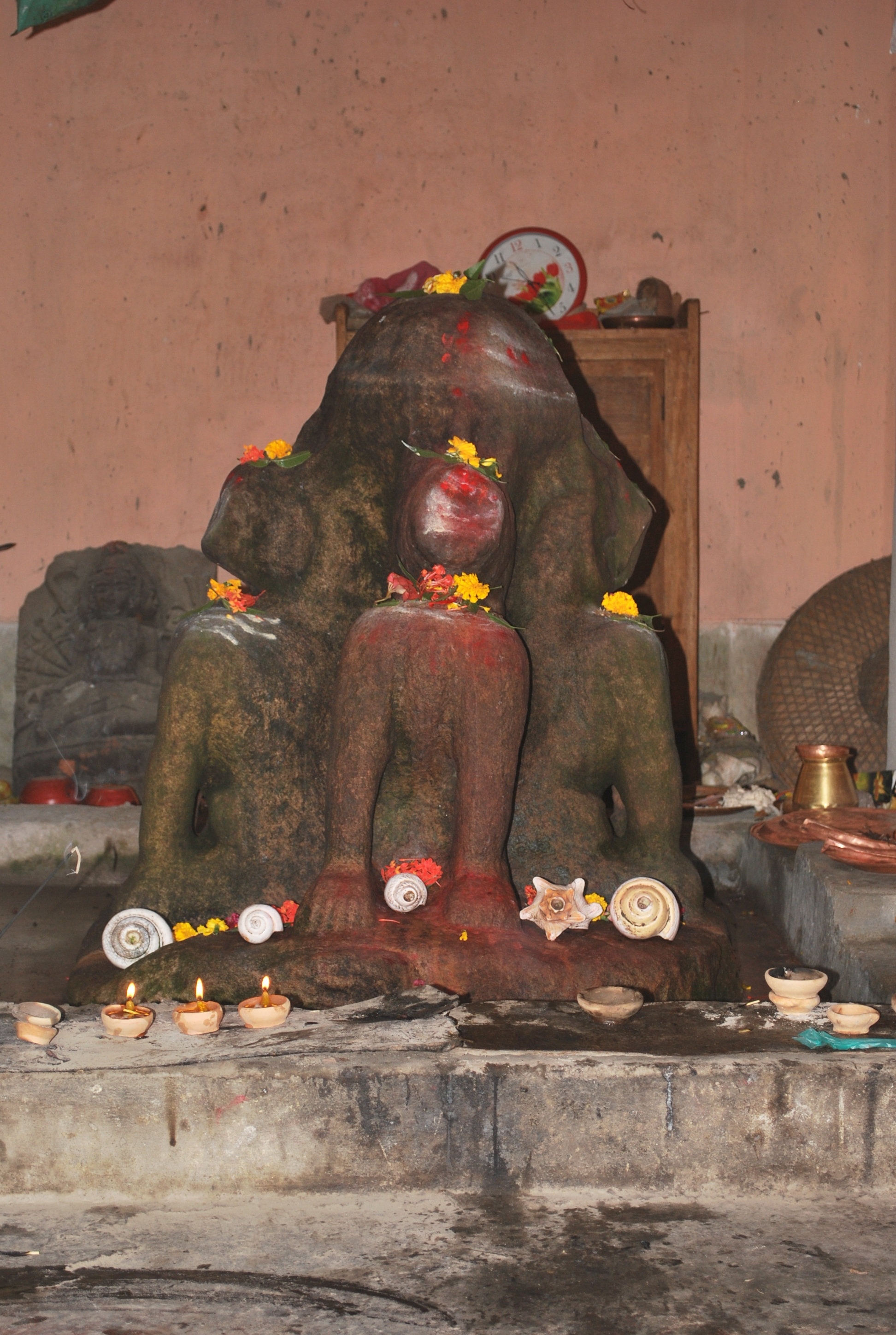
Bhaluk Gosai

== Transport ==
The city is a prominent road junction of NH 15 & Pabhoi Road. It is around 75 km east from Tezpur town.

The city has decorated entrance gate on NH 15 on the western side. It is also connected by Railway network. It is situated on Rangiya–Murkongselek section broad-gauge line. This rail line has been converted to broad-gauge in 2013. The new train connecting New Delhi and Itanagar is running through Viswanath Charali railway station. Two Inter city express trains connecting Guwahati have stops at Viswanath Charali railway station. This station has been upgraded to a standard Class III Station.

Currently Viswanath Charali (VNE) station is served by Donyi Polo Express from Naharlagun to Guwahati, Lachit Express from Murkongselek to Guwahati and a recently introduced fully Air Conditioned Shatabdi Express from Naharlagun to Guwahati along with a handful of other passenger trains.

The nearest airport is at Tezpur (Salonibari Airport) which has flights to Kolkata and Guwahati (Air India ATR class of aircraft). Day and night service of private and ASTC buses are available from Guwahati to Biswanath Chariali and from here to almost all major towns and cities of Assam and Arunachal Pradesh.

== Notable people ==
- Kamalakanta Bhattacharya (1853 - 1936) Known as Agnikavi, a poet, essayist, and social reformer

== See also ==
- Maral gaon
- Gelapukhuri
