= Gelapukhuri =

Village in Assam, India

Gelapukhuri (in short GP) is a famous place in Biswanath Chariali, India. It is a medium-sized village located 10 km from Biswanath Chariali City of Biswanath district, Assam with a total of 183 families residing. The Gelapukhuri village has a population of 872 of which 458 are males while 414 are females, as per Population Census 2011. In Gelapukhuri, the majority of people are Indian Gorkhas along with Assamese, Bodo, Adibasi etc.

In Gelapukhuri Village, the population of children age 0-6 is 132 which makes up 15.14% of the total population of the village. Average Sex Ratio of the village is 904. This is lower than the Assam state average of 958. Child Sex Ratio for Gelapukhuri as per census is 671. This is lower than the Assam average of 962.

Gelapukhuri Village has a lower literacy rate compared to Assam. In 2011, the literacy rate of Gelapukhuri Village was 62.57% compared to 72.19% of Assam In Gelapukhuri, male literacy stands at 70.45% while the female literacy rate was 54.29%. Communication access in Gelapukhuri is quite good. School buses, autos, public buses are available from here to the town and to Tezpur as well. Train access is good, although there are not any stations inside the village, but Biswanath Chariali railway station is just 4 km from Gelapukhuri. This is the place where the late Dharni Rijal was born and is generally considered a martyr by locals. Rijal died at the hands of the NDFB (The National Democratic Front of Boroland, which was an armed separatist outfit). Gelapukhuri Village is a rapidly developing village. It has great youth power with youth boys and girls excelling in various activities in education as well as sports, culture activities and various extra curricular activities. Recently, in 2016, the youth boys of Gelapukhuri created a volleyball club naming it Gelapukhuri Youth Volleyball Club GYVC. Gelapukhuri has a strong volleyball youths team. The team has won various tournaments.

== Details at a Glance ==
- Name: Gelapukhuri Village
- PS: Gingia, Biswanath Chariali
- Pin: 784176
- Nearby Cities: Biswanath Chariali (10 km), Tezpur (84 km)
- District: Biswanath District
- State: Assam
- Country: India
- Schools in Gelapukhuri: ShankarDev Vidya Niketan, Gelapukhuri LP school, Baghmara HS, Baghmara ME, Disiri LP, Pulisumoni LP school, Jyotipur LP school, etc.

== See also ==
- Maral gaon
