= Kamakhya Prasad Tripathy =

Indian politician

Kamakhya Prasad Tripathy Ex. Finance Minister of Assam

6th Finance Minister of Assam
- In office 1967–1972
- Preceded by: Fakhruddin Ali Ahmed
- Succeeded by: Sarat Chandra Sinha

Member of Assam Legislative Assembly
- In office 1957–1972
- Preceded by: Constituency established
- Succeeded by: Kosheswar Bora
- Constituency: Biswanath

Member of Parliament, Lok Sabha
- In office 1952-1957
- Constituency: Darrang Lok Sabha Constituency

Personal details
- Born: 12 May 1930 Tezpur, Assam, British India
- Died: 19 March 1978 (aged 51) Tezpur, Assam, India
- Party: Indian National Congress, Janata Party
- Education: Cotton University
- Profession: Politician, professor

Kamakhya Prasad Tripathy (died 1978) was an Indian politician, educator and independence activist. He was a member of 1st Lok Sabha from Darrang Lok Sabha constituency, Finance Minister of Assam under Chief Ministers Bimala Prasad Chaliha,Mahendra Mohan Choudhry and 3 times former member of Assam Legislative Assembly from Biswanath Assembly constituency. He was also the founding Principal of Darrang College.

== Electoral history ==
Year	Constituency	Election	Result	Votes	Party
1951–52	Darrang	Parliament of India	Won	81,775	Indian National Congress
1957	Biswanath	Assam Legislative Assembly	Won	14,418	Indian National Congress
1962	Biswanath	Assam Legislative Assembly	Won	20,490	Indian National Congress
1967	Biswanath	Assam Legislative Assembly	Won	13,295	Indian National Congress
1978	Behali	Assam Legislative Assembly	Lost	7,026	Janata Party
