= Bihpuria Assembly constituency =

Constituency of the Assam legislative assembly in India

Bihpuria
- Constituency No. 73 for the Assam Legislative Assembly

Constituency details
- Country: India
- Region: Northeast India
- State: Assam
- District: Lakhimpur
- Lok Sabha constituency: Sonitpur
- Established: 1951
- Reservation: None

Bihpuria Assembly constituency is one of the 126 assembly constituencies of Assam Legislative Assembly. Bihpuria forms part of the Sonitpur Lok Sabha constituency.

== Details ==
Following are details on Bihpuria Assembly constituency:

- Country: India.
- State: Assam.
- District: Lakhimpur district.
- Lok Sabha Constituency: Sonitpur Lok Sabha constituency
- Area Includes: Bihpuria MB, Narayanpur MB, Bihpuria Dev. Block(Part), Karunabari Dev. Block(Part), Narayanpur Dev. Block(Part).

== Members of Legislative Assembly ==
Election	Member	Party affiliation
1952	Sarveswar Borua	Indian National Congress
1962	Mohananda Bora	Indian National Congress
1967	Premadhar Bora	Independent
1972	Premadhar Bora	Independent
1978	Premadhar Bora	Independent
1983	Borgoram Deori	Indian National Congress
1985	Kesharam Bora	Independent
1991	Borgoram Deori	Indian National Congress
1996	Kesharam Bora	Asom Gana Parishad
2001	Premadhar Bora	Independent
2006	Bhupen Kumar Borah	Indian National Congress
2011	Bhupen Kumar Borah	Indian National Congress
2016	Debananda Hazarika	Bharatiya Janata Party
2021	Amiya Kumar Bhuyan	Bharatiya Janata Party

== Election results ==
=== 2026 ===
2026 Assam Legislative Assembly election: Bihpuria
Party	Candidate	Votes	%	±%
BJP	Bhupen Kumar Borah	73050	52.01	
INC	Narayan Bhuyan	64814	46.15	
Voters Party International	DR. DIGANTA GOGOI	854	0.61	
Independent	HEMEN GOGOI	532	0.38	
NOTA	None Of The Above	1203	0.86	
Margin of victory		8236		
Turnout		140453		
Rejected ballots				
Registered electors				
BJP hold		Swing		

=== 2021 ===
2021 Assam Legislative Assembly election: Bihpuria
Party	Candidate	Votes	%	±%
BJP	Amiya Kumar Bhuyan	58,979	48.53	−12.15
INC	Bhupen Kumar Borah	48,801	40.16	+3.36
AJP	Achyut Saikia (Madhab)	6,510	5.36	N/A
Independent	Anup Saikia	2,545	2.09	N/A
Independent	Tuleswar Pegu	1,932	1.59	N/A
Independent	Premadhar Bora	744	0.61	−0.07
Independent	Shobheshwar Gogoi	729	0.60	N/A
Independent	Mohim Bania	472	0.39	N/A
NOTA	None of the above	814	0.67	−0.09
Majority		10,178	8.37	−15.51
Turnout		1,21,526	79.4	−3.91
Registered electors		1,53,050		
BJP hold		Swing		

=== 2016 ===
2016 Assam Legislative Assembly election: Bihpuria
Party	Candidate	Votes	%	±%
BJP	Debananda Hazarika	66,563	60.68	
INC	Bhupen Kumar Borah	40,376	36.80	
Independent	Premadhar Bora	754	0.68	
RSC	Sunder Deori	693	0.63	
Independent	Gargi Deori	474	0.43	
NOTA	None of the above	834	0.76	
Majority		26,187	23.88	
Turnout		1,09,694	83.31	
Registered electors		1,31,665		
BJP gain from INC		Swing		
