= Moni Kumar Subba =

Indian politician (1958–2019)

Moni Kumar Subba (Limbu)

MP
- Constituency: Tezpur

Personal details
- Born: 16 March 1958 Darjeeling
- Died: 27 May 2019 (aged 61) New Delhi
- Party: INC
- Spouse: Jyoti Subba
- Children: 1 son and 3 daughters
- As of 25 September 2006

Moni Kumar Subba (16 March 1958 – 27 May 2019) was a member of the 12th Lok Sabha, 13th Lok Sabha and 14th Lok Sabha of India from 1998 to 2009. He represented the Tezpur constituency of Assam and was a member of the Indian National Congress (INC). He died due to heart and brain stroke at Artemis Hospital New Delhi, on 27 May 2019.

== Identity scandal ==
In 2007, the Central Bureau of Investigation told the Supreme Court of India that Subba's nationality was in doubt, and that existing citizenship proofs were forged. However, the court rejected a petition seeking his disqualification from the Parliamentary election, stating that the court "cannot unseat legislators". Before moving to Assam, M. K. Subba stayed in Sikkim for a while, where he is alleged to have come from Nepal. In Sikkim he is alleged to have run a chit fund company, then moved to Assam. In between he partnered in a 5 star Casino hotel The Royal Plaza in Gangtok, Sikkim, which after his death has some property dispute going on.
