= Bijoy Chandra Bhagavati =

Indian politician

Bijoy Chandra Bhagwati
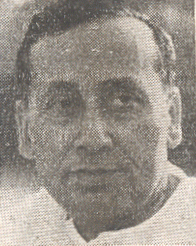

Member of Parliament, Lok Sabha
- In office 1957–1971
- Succeeded by: Kamala Prasad Tripathi
- Constituency: Tezpur

Personal details
- Party: Indian National Congress
- Spouse: Bimal Bhagwati
- Children: Dr. Ashok Bhagwati, Patanjali Bhagwati, Jaimini Bhagwati, Satyakam Bhagwati.

Bijoy Chandra Bhagwati (20 January 1904 – 8 May 1997) was an Indian politician belonging to the Indian National Congress. He was awarded the Padma Bhushan in 1992.

== Career ==
He was elected to the Lok Sabha, lower house of the Parliament of India, from the Tezpur constituency in Assam in 1957, 1962 and 1967. He was national president of INTUC. He served as Deputy Minister in the Ministry of Works, Housing and Urban Development First Indira Gandhi ministry from 24 January 1966 to 13 March 1967.
