= Mariani Assembly constituency =

Assembly constituency of Assam

Mariani
- Constituency No. 101 for the Assam Legislative Assembly

Constituency details
- Country: India
- Region: Northeast India
- State: Assam
- Division: Upper Assam
- District: Jorhat
- Lok Sabha constituency: Jorhat
- Established: 1967
- Reservation: None

Mariani is one of the 126 assembly constituencies of Assam Legislative Assembly. Mariani forms part of the Jorhat Lok Sabha constituency.

== Members of Legislative Assembly ==
Year	Name	Party
1967	Gajen Tanti	Indian National Congress
1972	Gajen Tanti	Indian National Congress
1978	Gajen Tanti	Indian National Congress
1983	Siba Buragohain	Indian National Congress
1985	Naren Tanti	Independent
1991	Rupam Kurmi	Indian National Congress
1996	Rupam Kurmi	Indian National Congress
2001	Rupam Kurmi	Indian National Congress
2004^	Alok Kumar Ghosh	All India Trinamool Congress
2006	Rupjyoti Kurmi	Indian National Congress
2011	Rupjyoti Kurmi	Indian National Congress
2016	Rupjyoti Kurmi	Indian National Congress
2021	Rupjyoti Kurmi	Indian National Congress
2021^	Rupjyoti Kurmi	Bhartiya Janata Party
2026	Rupjyoti Kurmi	Bhartiya Janata Party

^ Indicates by election

== Election results ==
=== 2026 ===
2026 Assam Legislative Assembly election: Mariani
Party	Candidate	Votes	%	±%
BJP	Rupjyoti Kurmi	79632	58.45	
RD	Dr Gyanashree Bora	52792	38.75	
NOTA	NOTA	1574	1.16	
Margin of victory		26840		
Turnout		136231		
Registered electors				
BJP hold		Swing		

=== 2021 by-election ===
2021 Assam Legislative Assembly By-Election: Mariani
Party	Candidate	Votes	%	±%
BJP	Rupjyoti Kurmi	55,489	62.38	+15.38
INC	Luhit Konwar	15,385	17.3	−31.7
RD	Sanjib Gogoi	15,192	17.08	New
None of the Above	None of the Above	1,515	1.7	−
Assam Sangrami Mancha	Gopal Chandra Ghatuwar	1,372	1.54	New
Majority		40,104		
Turnout		88,953		
BJP gain from INC		Swing		

=== 2021 ===
2021 Assam Legislative Assembly election: Mariani
Party	Candidate	Votes	%	±%
INC	Rupjyoti Kurmi	47,308	49%	
BJP	Ramani Tanti	44,862	47%	
Majority		40,104		
Turnout				
INC hold		Swing		

=== 2016 ===
2016 Assam Legislative Assembly election: Mariani
Party	Candidate	Votes	%	±%
INC	Rupjyoti Kurmi	36,701	40.53	
NCP	Alok Kumar Ghosh	34,908	38.55	
BJP	Dulen Nayak	14,602	16.13	
Independent	Jintu Hazarika	1,954	4.36	
NOTA	None of the above	1,613	1.78	
Independent	Diganta Phukan	770	0.85	
Majority		1,793	1.98	
Turnout		90,548	84.85	
INC hold		Swing		

=== 2011 ===
2011 Assam Legislative Assembly election: Mariani
Party	Candidate	Votes	%	±%
INC	Rupjyoti Kurmi	35,754	46.93	+3.52
AITC	Alok Kumar Ghosh	28,696	37.67	
BJP	Santanu Kumar Gogoi	3,376	4.43	−2.23
AGP	Dulen Nayak	3,961	5.2	
Independent	Sanjib Gogoi	3,320	4.36	
Independent	June Tanti	1,071	1.41	
Majority		7,058	9.26	
Turnout		76,178	73.05	
INC hold		Swing		

=== 1972 ===
1972 Assam Legislative Assembly election: Mariani
Party	Candidate	Votes	%	±%
INC	Gajen Tanti	17,949	72.61	
Independent	Jisan Mipun	5,682	22.99	
Independent	Deben Gogoi	1,089	4.41	
Majority		12,267	49.62	
Turnout		24,720	55.37	
Registered electors		46,900		
INC hold		Swing		
