= Kurmi, Republic of Dagestan =

Kurmi Курми
- Selo
- Location within Republic of Dagestan Location within Russia
- Coordinates: 42°27′N 47°02′E
- Country: Russia
- Region: Republic of Dagestan
- District: Gergebilsky District
- Time zone: UTC+3:00

Kurmi (Russian: Курми) is a rural locality (a selo) in Gergebilsky District, Republic of Dagestan, Russia. The population was 1,510 as of 2010. There are 14 streets.

== Geography ==
Kurmi is located 5 km southwest of Gergebil (the district's administrative centre) by road, on the right bank of the Karakoysu River. Khvartikuni and Murada are the nearest rural localities.
