= Habul Chakraborty =

Indian politician (1960–2020)

Assam Legislative Assembly
- In office 2011–2016
- Preceded by: Bhimananda Tanti
- Succeeded by: Ashok Singhal
- Constituency: Dhekiajuli

Personal details
- Born: 1 February 1960; Dhekiajuli, Sonitpur Assam, India
- Died: 16 February 2020 (aged 60); Tezpur Medical College and Hospital, Sonitpur, Assam, India
- Political party: Indian National Congress

Habul Chakraborty (1 February 1960 – 16 February 2020) was an Indian businessman and politician from Assam belonging to Indian National Congress. He was a legislator of the Assam Legislative Assembly.

== Biography ==
Chakraborty was born on 1 February 1960 at Dhekiajuli in Sonitpur to Dilip Kumar Chakraborty and Chhaya Rani Chakraborty. He was elected to the Assam Legislative Assembly from Dhekiajuli in 2011.

Chakraborty was married to Rupali Chakraborty on 2 May 1993. They had a son and a daughter.

Chakraborty died on 16 February 2020 at Tezpur Medical College and Hospital at the age of 60.
