= Sarai Kurmi =

Sarai Kurmi Sarāi Kurmi
- Village
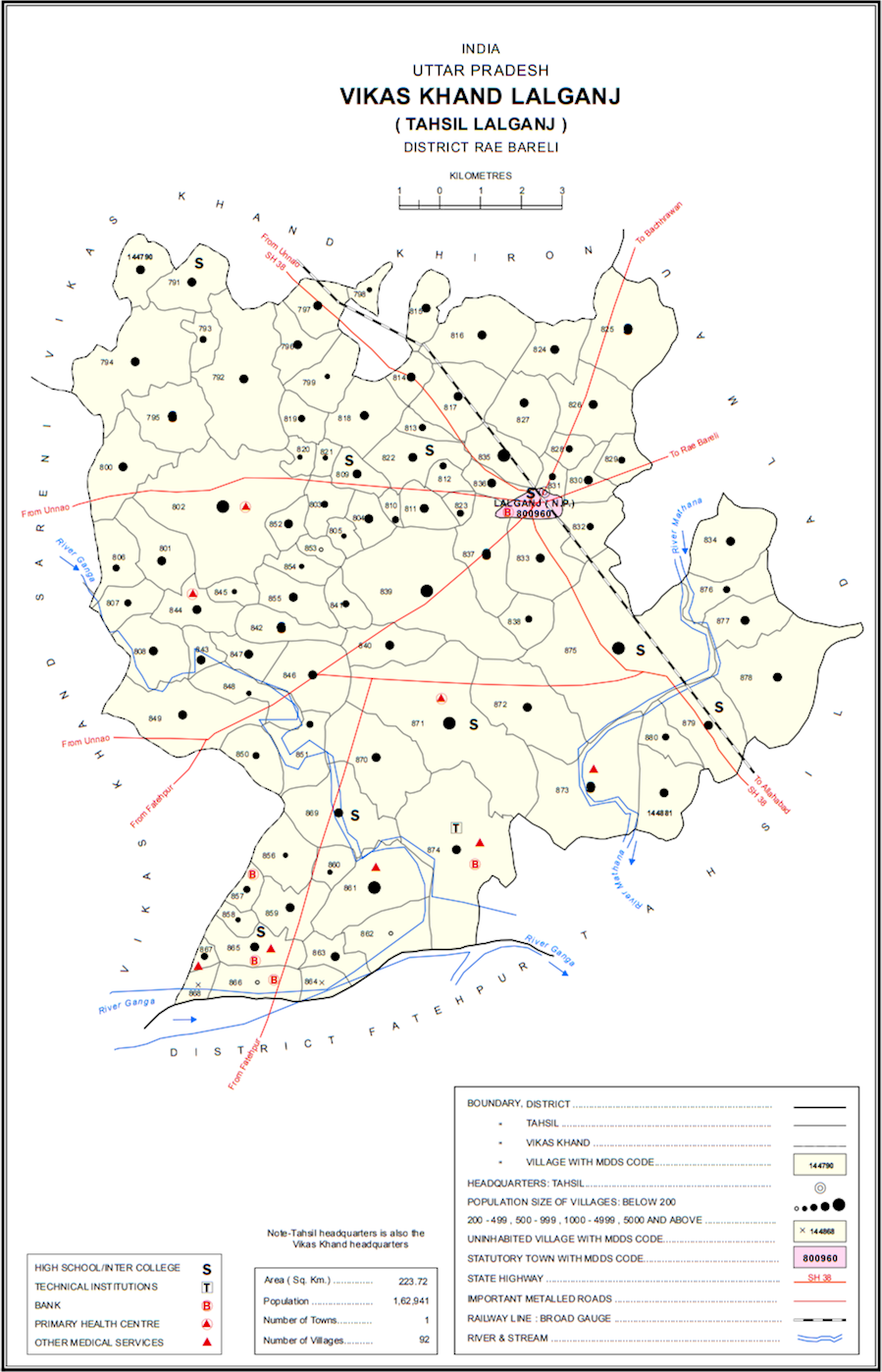
- Map showing Sarai Kurmi (#806) in Lalganj CD block

- Location in Uttar Pradesh, India
- Coordinates: 26.15584°N 80.874654°E
- Country: India
- State: Uttar Pradesh
- District: Raebareli

Area
  - Total: 1.783 km^{2} (0.688 sq mi)

Population (2011)
  - Total: 843
  - Density: 473/km^{2} (1,220/sq mi)

Languages
  - Official: Hindi
- Time zone: UTC+5:30 (IST)
- Vehicle registration: UP-35

Sarai Kurmi is a village in Lalganj block of Rae Bareli district, Uttar Pradesh, India. It is located 4 km from Lalganj, the block and tehsil headquarters. As of 2011, it has a population of 843 people, in 197 households. It has no healthcare facilities and does not host a permanent market or a weekly haat. It belongs to the nyaya panchayat of Behta Kalan.

The 1951 census recorded Sarai Kurmi as comprising 3 hamlets, with a total population of 452 people (228 male and 224 female), in 85 households and 82 physical houses. The area of the village was given as 440 acres. 25 residents were literate, all male. The village was listed as belonging to the pargana of Sareni and the thana of Sareni.

The 1961 census recorded Sarai Kurmi as comprising 3 hamlets, with a total population of 552 people (263 male and 289 female), in 99 households and 87 physical houses. The area of the village was given as 440 acres.

The 1981 census recorded Sarai Kurmi as having a population of 725 people, in 129 households, and having an area of 178.47 hectares. The main staple foods were listed as wheat and rice.

The 1991 census recorded Sarai Kurmi as having a total population of 773 people (399 male and 374 female), in 150 households and 150 physical houses. The area of the village was listed as 178 hectares. Members of the 0-6 age group numbered 147, or 19% of the total; this group was 54% male (80) and 46% female (67). Members of scheduled castes made up 37% of the village's population, while no members of scheduled tribes were recorded. The literacy rate of the village was 47% (248 men and 112 women). 204 people were classified as main workers (194 men and 10 women), while 0 people were classified as marginal workers; the remaining 569 residents were non-workers. The breakdown of main workers by employment category was as follows: 113 cultivators (i.e. people who owned or leased their own land); 61 agricultural labourers (i.e. people who worked someone else's land in return for payment); 0 workers in livestock, forestry, fishing, hunting, plantations, orchards, etc.; 0 in mining and quarrying; 8 household industry workers; 0 workers employed in other manufacturing, processing, service, and repair roles; 0 construction workers; 0 employed in trade and commerce; 0 employed in transport, storage, and communications; and 22 in other services.
