= Ashok Singhal (politician) =

Indian politician

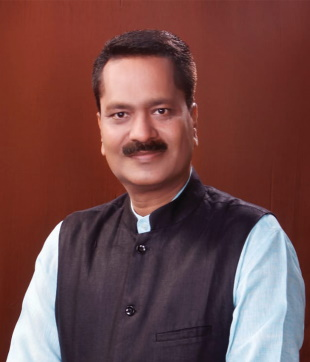
- Official portrait

Cabinet Minister, Assam
- Incumbent
- Assumed office 10 May 2021
- Chief Minister: Himanta Biswa Sarma
- Departments: Irrigation (2021–present); Guwahati Development, Urban Development (2021); Housing and Urban Affairs (2021–24); Health and Family Welfare (2024–present)

Chairman, Guwahati Metropolitan Development Authority
- In office 23 October 2018 – 10 May 2021
- Chief Minister: Sarbananda Sonowal
- Preceded by: Dhirendra Nath Baruah
- Succeeded by: Narayan Deka

Member, Assam Legislative Assembly
- Incumbent
- Assumed office 19 May 2016
- Preceded by: Habul Chakraborty
- Constituency: Dhekiajuli

Personal details
- Born: 19 September 1968 (age 58) Guwahati, Assam, India
- Party: Bharatiya Janata Party
- Spouse: Silpi Anand Singhal
- Children: 2
- Parents: Parmanand Singhal (father); Indumati Singhal (mother)
- Education: Gauhati Commerce College
- Profession: Politician, Entrepreneur

Ashok Singhal (born 29 December 1968 in Guwahati, Assam) is an Indian politician of Bharatiya Janata Party, Assam and the current Minister of Health and Family Welfare and Irrigation, Government of Assam. He is also the Guardian Minister of two districts of Assam, namely Goalpara and Biswanath. He was elected for the first time to Assam Legislative Assembly in 2016 from Dhekiajuli constituency. In the 2021 Assembly election, he was re-elected from the same constituency. On 9 December 2024 he was named minister of health.

== Personal life ==
He was born In agarwal family on 29 December 1968 to Late Parmananda Singhal and Indumati Singhal. He is a resident of Kumarpara, Guwahati, Assam. He married Silpi Anand Singhal in 1992, with whom he has two sons: Lokesh Anand Singhal and Vivek Anand Singhal.

== Education ==
He did his graduation from the Gauhati Commerce College in 1990. He also has a Post Graduate Diploma in Management (PGDM).

== Political career ==
Ashok Singhal was a member of Rashtriya Swayamsevak Sangh (RSS). He was also a student leader of Akhil Bharatiya Vidyarthi Parishad (ABVP). Later he joined BJP and became the spokesperson of BJP Assam Pradesh. He was also the Secretary and Treasurer of Assam BJP. He was elected as an MLA to the Assam Legislative Assembly for the first time in 2016 from Dhekiajuli constituency. He is also known as a 'Man of development', for his work in Dhekiajuli. He won the 2016 election against Habul Chakraborty (Indian National Congress candidate) by 71,425 votes. Singhal was re-elected to Assam Legislative Assembly in 2021 from Dhekiajuli with 93,768 votes defeating Benudhar Nath of Congress party. Singhal is also a well known businessman and a social worker. He runs an NGO named 'Jana Jagriti'.

== Journey with Jana Jagriti ==
Ashok Singhal runs an NGO in Assam named Jana Jagriti. Saving mighty river Brahmaputra was one of the most important movements started by Jana Jagriti. Ashok Singhal has been the chief of this organization.

The movement to save the Brahmaputra reached its peak when in the year 2010, Jana Jagriti claimed that China was not only diverting water from the Brahmaputra (called Yarlung Zangto in China) at Great Band by constructing a tunnel but also undertaking a series of infrastructure development projects along the Tibetan plateau.

== Save River Brahmaputra Campaign ==
Guwahati-based NGO, Jana Jagriti, under the leadership of activist-politician Ashok Singhal spearheaded a campaign named 'Save River Brahmaputra' on the threats posed by dams on Brahmaputra in China in 2010. Few believed him when he first highlighted a series of Chinese hydro-power projects on the Yarlung Tsangpo (also called Yarlung Zangbo in China and Brahmaputra in India), through satellite imageries and warned people and the governments in the northeastern states of the danger of the mighty river slowly getting dried up. Later, he was vindicated when Beijing officially intimated New Delhi on blocking a Tsangpo tributary in September 2016.

His NGO, Jana Jagriti, in 2016 claimed that China was working on 26 power projects. The NGO believed that once those projects get commissioned, the flow of Tsangpo water into India will be reduced by 64% during monsoon and 85% during the non-monsoon months. According to Jana Jagriti, India receives 78.10 BCM water from China through Brahmaputra at its entry point at Gorging village in Arunachal. The receipt of the water during the monsoon months is 56.12 BCM and during the non-monsoon period, it is 21.98 BCM.
