= Swarup Upadhyay =

Indian politician

Member of Parliament, Lok Sabha
- In office 1991–1996
- Preceded by: Bipinpal Das
- Succeeded by: Iswar Prasanna Hazarika
- Constituency: Tezpur

Personal details
- Born: 4 March 1946 (age 80)
- Party: Indian National Congress
- Spouse: Tara Subedi

Swarup Upadhyay is an Indian politician. He was elected to the Lok Sabha, the lower house of the Parliament of India, as a member of the Indian National Congress.
