= Pallab Lochan Das =

Indian politician

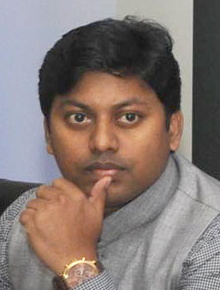

Member of Parliament, Lok Sabha
- In office 23 May 2019 – 4 June 2024
- Preceded by: Ram Prasad Sharma
- Succeeded by: Ranjit Dutta
- Constituency: Tezpur

Minister of State, Assam
- In office 24 May 2016 – 4 June 2019
- Chief Minister: Sarbananda Sonowal
- Departments: Tea Tribes Welfare (I/c); Labour Welfare (I/c); Power, Revenue and Disaster Management (2016–18); Education (2018–19)
- Preceded by: Atuwa Munda (Tea Tribes); Tarun Gogoi (Labour)
- Succeeded by: Sarbananda Sonowal

Member, Assam Legislative Assembly
- Incumbent
- Assumed office 19 May 2016
- Preceded by: Bhimananda Tanti
- Succeeded by: Rajen Borthakur
- Constituency: Rangapara
- In office 13 May 2011 – 19 May 2016
- Preceded by: Ranjit Dutta
- Succeeded by: Ranjit Dutta
- Constituency: Behali

Personal details
- Born: 31 December 1978 (age 47) Biswanath Chariali, Assam
- Party: Bharatiya Janata Party (since 2015)
- Other political affiliations: Indian National Congress (2005–2015)

Pallab Lochan Das (born 31 December 1978, in Biswanath Chariali, Assam) is a Bharatiya Janata Party politician from Assam, India. He was elected in Assam Legislative Assembly election in 2011 (from Behali Vidhan Sabha constituency) and 2016 from Rangapara constituency. He was the Member of Parliament from Tezpur (Lok Sabha constituency). He became a minister in the Sarbananda Sonowal-led government in 2016.
