= Rupjyoti Kurmi =

Indian politician

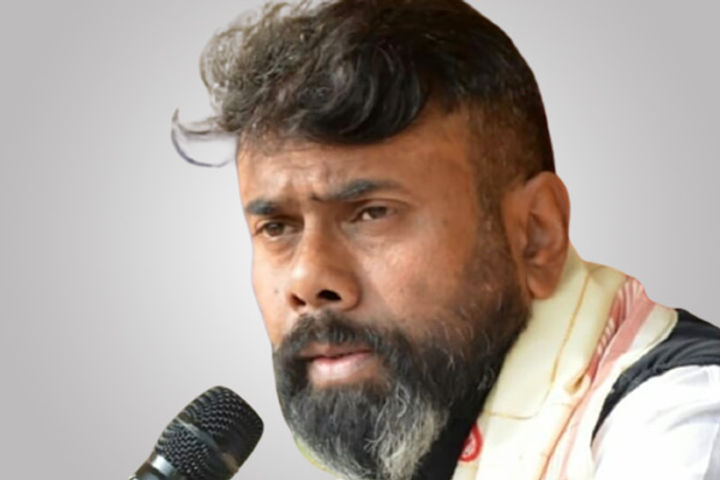

Member of Assam Legislative Assembly
- Incumbent
- Assumed office 11 May 2006
- Preceded by: Alok Kumar Ghosh
- Constituency: Mariani

Personal details
- Born: 24 July 1977 (age 48) Dibrugarh Medical College, Assam
- Party: Bharatiya Janata Party (2021-present)
- Other political affiliations: Indian National Congress (1999-2021)
- Spouse: Manchuria Bordoloi (m. 2006)
- Children: Nirvan Kurmi
- Parent(s): Cheniram Kurmi (Father); Rupam Kurmi (Mother)
- Education: 12th Pass
- Alma mater: Jagannath Barooah College
- Profession: Businessman

Rupjyoti Kurmi (born 24 July 1977) is an Indian politician from Assam. He is a five time member of the Assam Legislative Assembly from Mariani Assembly constituency in Jorhat district.

He is the son of Cheniram Kurmi and his mother, Rupam Kurmi, was a former cabinet minister.

== Career ==
Kurmi was first elected as an MLA from Mariani in the 2006 Assam Legislative Assembly election representing the Indian National Congress and went on to win in 2011, 2016 and 2021, also on Congress ticket. In May 2021, he defeated Ramani Tanti of Bharatiya Janata Party by 2,446 votes in 2021 Assam Assembly election.

In June 2021, he was expelled from Indian National Congress due to disagreement of promotion of the youngster in the party and for his anti-party activities. Later, he joined Bharatiya Janata Party in the presence of Chief Minister of Assam Himanta Biswa Sarma. He resigned as MLA from Congress Party necessitating the 2021 by-election which he won on BJP ticket. Later, he retained the seat for BJP in the 2026 Assembly election.

In April 2023, he sparked a controversy, asking to demolish Taj Mahal and Qutub Minar to build Hindu temples on their sites.
