= Promod Borthakur =

Indian politician

Promod Borthakur is a Bharatiya Janata Party politician from Assam. He was elected to the Assam Legislative Assembly in the 2016 election from Biswanath.
