= Debananda Hazarika =

Indian politician

Debananda Hazarika is a Bharatiya Janata Party politician from Assam. He has been elected in Assam Legislative Assembly election in 2016 from Bihpuria constituency. He is currently the chairman of Assam State Textbook Production and Publication Corporation Ltd.
