= Krishna Kamal Tanti =

Indian politician

Member of Legislative Assembly Rangapara
- Incumbent
- Assumed office 2021
- Constituency: Rangapara

Personal details
- Born: Assam
- Party: Bharatiya Janata Party
- Education: Dispur Law College
- Occupation: Politician

Krishna Kamal Tanti is a Bharatiya Janata Party politician from the Indian state of Assam. He has been elected in Assam Legislative Assembly election in 2021 from Rangapara. He is also a member of the advisory board on the eradication of Child Labour.

== Early life ==
He is the son of Kamala Kanta Tanti and he lives in Nikamal in Sonitpur district. He completed his LLB from Dispur Law College in 2014.

== Career ==
He worked as a lawyer. In 2021 Assam state election, he contested from Rangapara Assembly seat as BJP candidate and won.
