= Rupam Kurmi =

Indian politician

Minister for Employment and Craftsmanship
- In office 2001 - 4 February 2004
- Chief Minister: Tarun Gogoi

Member of Assam Legislative Assembly
- In office 1991 - 4 February 2004
- Preceded by: Naren Tanti
- Succeeded by: Alok Kumar Ghosh
- Constituency: Mariani

Personal details
- Died: 4 February 2004 (aged 55); All India Institutes of Medical Sciences, New Delhi
- Political party: Indian National Congress
- Spouse: Cheniram Kurmi (d. 1990)
- Children: 2, including Rupjyoti
- Parent: Birsha Khalka

Rupam Kurmi (died 4 February 2004) was an Indian politician from the state of Assam. She was a former Minister for Employment and Craftsmanship in the Tarun Gogoi cabinet, and Member of Assam Legislative Assembly for Mariani. Her son Rupyoti Kurmi, had been an MLA for the Indian National Congress and is now one for the Bharatiya Janata Party.
