= Biswanath district =

District of Assam, India

- District of Assam
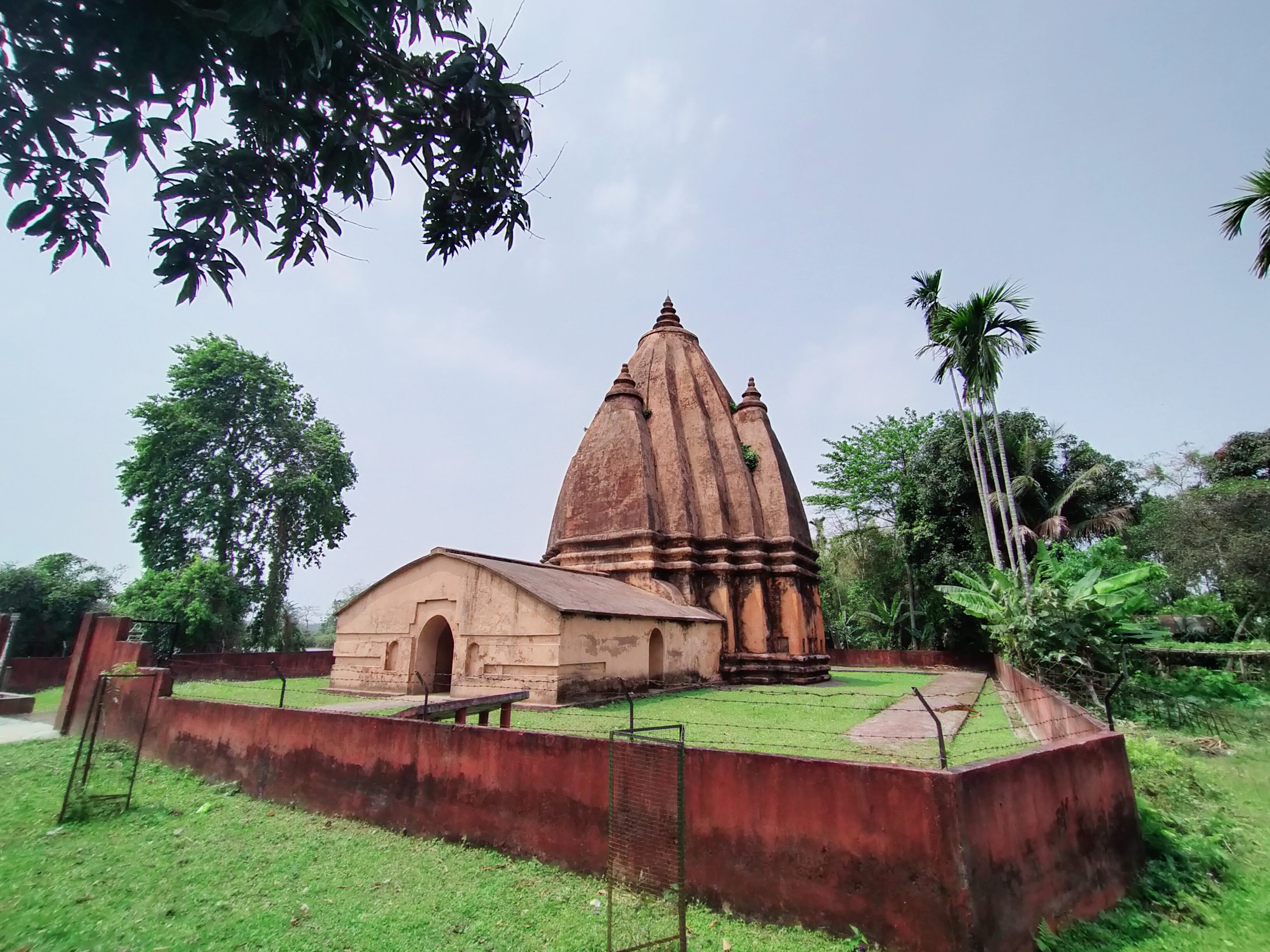
- Vasudeva Doul
- Interactive map of Biswanath district
- Coordinates: 26.729°N 93.1471°E
- Country: India
- State: Assam
- Division: North Assam
- Incorporated (District): 15 August 2015
- Headquarter: Biswanath Chariali

Government
  - Lok Sabha constituencies: Sonitpur
  - Vidhan Sabha constituencies: Biswanath, Behali, Gohpur

Area
  - Total: 1,415 km^{2} (546 sq mi)
- Elevation: 48–849 m (157–2,785 ft)

Population (2011)
  - Total: 612,491
  - Density: 432.9/km^{2} (1,121/sq mi)

Languages
  - Official: Assamese
- Time zone: UTC+5:30 (IST)
- Postal code: 784 XXX
- Vehicle registration: AS-32
- Website: https://biswanath.assam.gov.in

Biswanath district (IPA: ˌbɪswəˈnɑːθ ˈtʃɑːrɪˌælɪ) is an administrative district in the state of Assam in India. It is one of the newly created districts in 2015, declared by Assam Chief Minister Tarun Gogoi on 15 August 2015.

The district is created amalgamating Gohpur and most part of Biswanath Sub division on earlier Sonitpur district. The district is bounded by Arunachal Pradesh on north, Golaghat, Brahmaputra River on the south, Lakhimpur district on the east and Sonitpur district on the west. The administrative headquarter is located at Biswanath Chariali.

On 31 December 2022, the district remerged with existing Sonitpur district ahead of delimitation process by ECI in the state.

However, on August 25, 2023, the Assam cabinet announced the restoration of Biswanath's district status.

== History ==
The major part of Biswanath district formed a part of the Chutiya kingdom until it was annexed in the 16th century by the Ahoms. The western part of the district was under the rule of independent Bhuyan chieftains. The border between the Chutia kingdom and Bhuyan principalities were marked by the Dikarai and the Ghiladhari rivers. The Chutia kings built many forts in the region which included the Buroi fort (near Nyishi hills) and the Pratapgarh fort built by king Pratap Narayan. The Ita Fort lies to the north of Biswanath Chariali

== Administration ==
Headquarter
Biswanath Chariali
Name of Sub-Divisions
Biswanath Chariali, Gohpur
Name of Revenue Circles/ Tehsils
Biswanath Chariali, Gohpur, Helem
Name of Development(C.D.) Blocks

- Pub-Chaiduar Development Block
- Chaiduar Development Block
- Behali Development Block
- Baghmora Development Block
- Biswanath Development Block
- Sakomotha development Block
- Sotea Development Block

Name of Police Stations

- Gohpur Police Station
- Helem Police Station
- Behali Police Station
- Ginjia Police Station
- Biswanath Chariali Police Station
- Sootea Police Station
- Hawajan Police Outpost
- Borgang Police Outpost

Number of Villages
832
Names of Towns
Biswanath Chariali, Gohpur
Name of Town Committees
Biswanath Chariali, Gohpur

== Demographics ==
According to the 2011 census, Biswanath district has a population of 612,491, of which 31,368 (5.12%) live in urban areas. Biswanath had a sex ratio of 968 females per 1000 males. Scheduled Castes and Scheduled Tribes make up 43,763 (7.15%) and 93,174 (15.21%) of the population respectively.

Religions in Biswanath district (2011)
Religion	Percent
Hinduism	83.96%
Islam	8.52%
Christianity	6.92%
Other or not stated	0.60%

As of the 2011 census, Hindus made up 514,259 (83.96%), while Muslims made up 52,155 (8.52%) and Christians (6.92%) of the population respectively.

Languages of Biswanath district (2011)
1. Assamese (34.1%)
2. Sadri (13.6%)
3. Bengali (8.58%)
4. Nepali (7.93%)
5. Boro (7.23%)
6. Mising (7.09%)
7. Odia (6.76%)
8. Mundari (3.41%)
9. Karbi (2.56%)
10. Hindi (1.84%)
11. Others (6.98%)

At the time of the 2011 census, 34.06% of the population speaks Assamese, 13.56% Sadri, 8.58% Bengali, 7.93% Nepali, 7.23% Boro, 7.09% Mising, 6.76% Odia, 3.41% Mundari, 2.56% Karbi and 1.84% Hindi as their first language.

== Railway Station ==
1. Dubia
2. Gohpur
3. Brahmajan
4. Helem
5. Niz Borgang
6. Monabari
7. Viswanath Chariali
8. Niz Sotea

== See also ==
- List of districts of Assam
- Maral gaon
- Gelapukhuri
