= Joseph Toppo =

Indian politician

Member of Assam Legislative Assembly Dhekiajuli
- Constituency: Dhekiajuli Constituency
- In office 1996–2006
- In office 1985–1990
- In office September 2001 – September 2008

Minister, Government of Assam
- In office 1985–1990

Personal details
- Born: 1943
- Died: 2016 (aged 72–73)
- Party: Asom Gana Parishad

Joseph Toppo (1943 − 22 March 2016) was an Indian politician from Assam and a member of Asom Gana Parishad. He was a Member of Parliament, representing Tezpur (Lok Sabha constituency) of Assam.
