= Darrang College =

College in Assam, India

Coordinates: 26°38′12″N 92°47′49″E

Darrang College (Autonomous)
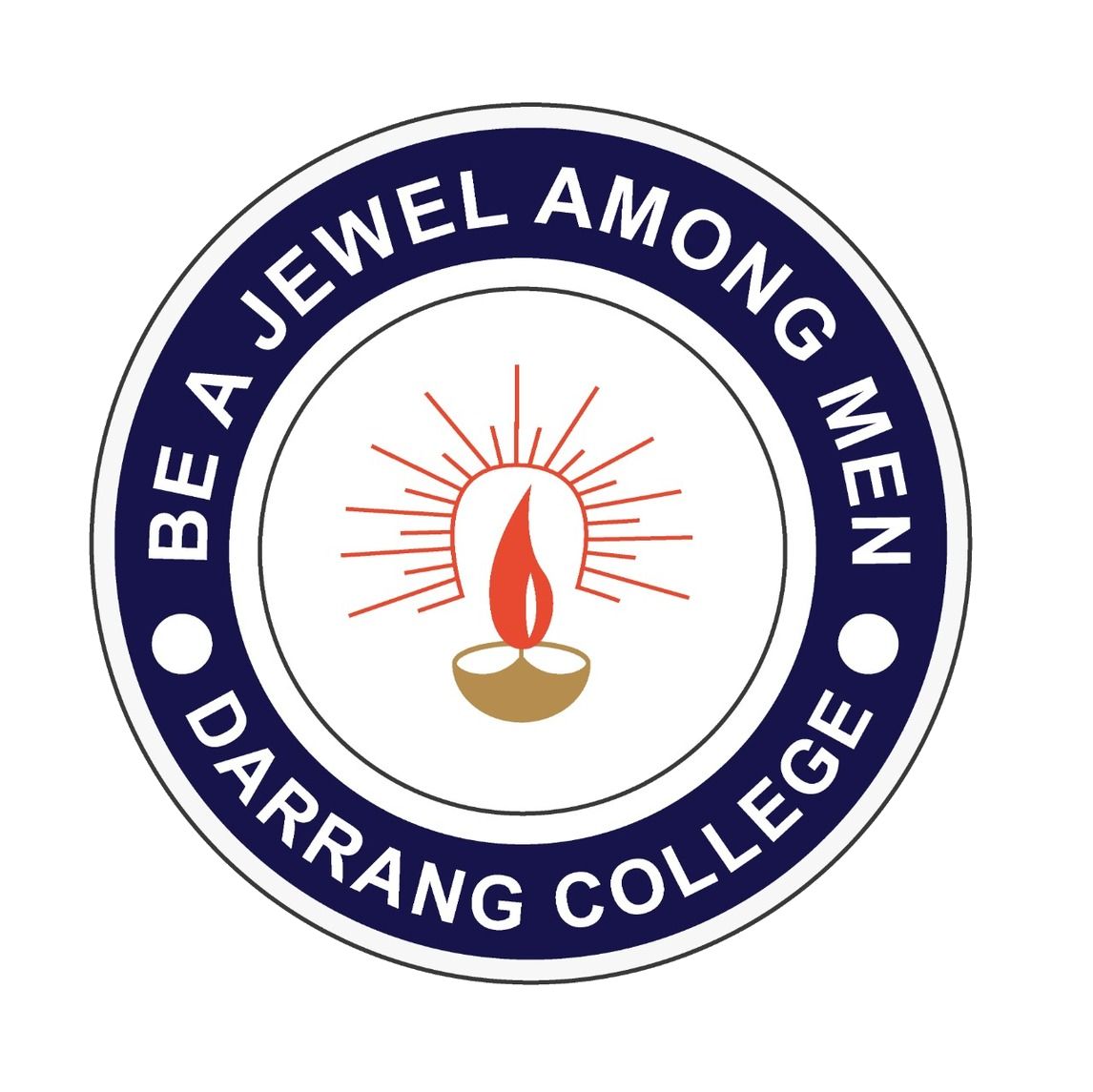
- Motto: Be a Jewel Among Men
- Type: Public college
- Established: 1945; 81 years ago
- Parent institution: Gauhati University
- Affiliations: Gauhati University
- President: Dr. Khageswar Barkakaty
- Principal: Dr. Palash Moni Saikia
- Faculty: 121
- Location: Tezpur, Assam, 784001, India
- Campus: Suburban
- Website: darrangcollege.ac.in

Darrang College, also known as Nalanda of the North Bank, is a college in Tezpur Municipality of Assam, a state of India. The college provides bachelor's degrees in Arts, Commerce and Science from Gauhati University, to which it is affiliated.

== History ==
Darrang College was established in July 1945, with 8 teachers, and 112 students on the roll. Kamakhya Prasad Tripathy, a "veteran freedom fighter and trade union leader", was the founding principal. Initially, classes were held at a bungalow of Arnaldo Duchi, an Italian who sold the property to the college. Subsequently, for nearly two years, the college moved to the American Base Hospital campus at Mission Chariali, then to the Dak bungalow. It adopted the present site in October 1951.

The Dalai Lama visited in 1959, followed by Smt. Indira Gandhi in 1963.

List of principals (1945–present)

Sr. no.	Principal	Image	Term started	Term ended
1.	Professor Kamakhya Prasad Tripathy		1945	
2.				
3.				

== Academics ==
Darrang College offers the following courses:

- Two year higher secondary course in Science, Arts and Commerce under Assam Higher Secondary Education Council
- Three year degree course in Science, Arts and Commerce under Gauhati University, Assam
- Master's degree in Assamese, Zoology, Botany under Gauhati University.
- B.Sc. in Biotechnology
- BCA from Gauhati University
- Distance education in Institute of Distance and Open Learning of Gauhati University (IDOL)
- Master's degree, degree, diploma, and certificate courses under Indira Gandhi National Open University (IGNOU)
- Certificate course in Computer Application
- Certificate course in Conservation Ecology in association with WWF of India
- Vocational courses
- PGDCA, BCA from IDOL, Gauhati University
- Course on Human Rights

== Notable alumni ==
Sr.no.	Name	Portrait	Student/faculty	Notability	Awards	Affiliation
1.	Swarnaprabha Mahanta		Student (1st Batch)	Swarnaprabha Mahanta, 1st female student of 1st batch of students. Former cabinet minister in Sarat Chandra Sinha Ministry and MLA from Sootea Assembly constituency.		
2.	Professor Dipak C. Jain		Student	Professor Dipak C. Jain, former director (dean) of Sasin Graduate Institute of Business Administration of Chulalongkorn University in Bangkok, Thailand and INSEAD Chaired Professor of Marketing.	Pravasi Bharatiya Samman	
3.	Tanka Bahadur Rai		Student	Tanka Bahadur Rai, former Speaker and Deputy Speaker of Assam Legislative Assembly and cabinet minister in Third Tarun Gogoi Ministry		
4.	Basanta Das		Student	Basanta Das, former cabinet minister in Third Tarun Gogoi Ministry and three time MLA of Mangaldoi Assembly constituency.		Department of Political Science
5.	Brindaban Goswami		Student	Brindaban Goswami, former Education Minister of Assam in First Mahanta Ministry and five time former MLA from Tezpur Assembly constituency.		
6.	Professor Baneswar Saikia		Student	Baneswar Saikia is a former lawyer, a retired professor of Anandaram Dhekial Phookan College of Nagaon, the first head and the founder of the Department of Economics of the same college, politician, Marxist economicist, writer and social worker. He is also a former General Secretary of Revolutionary Communist Party of India and former MLA of Batadroba Assembly constituency.		Department of Economics
7.	Birendra Prasad Baishya		Student and Professor	Birendra Prasad Baishya, MP from Rajya Sabha and former Union cabinet minister in Deve Gowda ministry and Gujral ministry. He is also the president of Indian Weightlifting Federation.		
8.	Rajen Borthakur		Student	Rajen Borthakur, former MLA from Tezpur and Rangapara assembly constituencies		
9.	Sheela Borthakur		Student	Sheela Borthakur, Padma Shri award winner was an Indian social worker, littérateur and the founder president of the Sadou Asom Lekhika Samaroh Samity (SALSS), a non governmental organization working in the socio-cultural and literary milieu of Assam.	Padma Shri	
10.	Chetana Das		Student	Chetana Das is an Indian comedian and actress from Assam. She is a popular face in Assamese cinema for her comic roles. She is the comedy queen of Assamese film industry.		
11.	Purabi Bormudoi		Student	Purabi Bormudoi was an Indian writer in the Assamese language, known for her social and periodical novels and short stories. She was awarded the Sahitya Akademi Award in the Assamese language in 2007 for her novel Shantanukulanandan, a saga of the mighty Brahmaputra River.	Sahitya Akademi Award Assam Valley Literary Award	Department of History
12.	Bizit Saikia		Student	Bizit Saikia, former Industries Minister of Assam in Second Saikia Ministry and Barman Ministry		
13.	Praneshwar Basumatary		Student	Praneshwar Basumatary, former MLA from Sootea Assembly constituency		
14.	Rubul Sharma		Student	Rubul Sharma, secretary of Communist Party of India (Marxist–Leninist) Liberation Assam State Committee		
15.	Professor Jiban Bora		Professor/vice principal	ProfessorJiban Bora, former MLA from Tezpur, ward commissioner of Tezpur Municipal Board, former vice principal of Darrang College, founder principal of Tezpur Law College and head of Political Science Department, Darrang College.		Department of Political Science
16.	Professor Amalendu Guha		Professor	Professor Amalendu Guha, Marxist historian, poet and a littérateur from Assam. He started his teaching career at Darrang College, Tezpur, and also taught at Gokhale Institute of Politics and Economics, Pune, and thereafter at Delhi School of Economics.		Department of Economics
17.	Professor Dr. Bipinpal Das		Professor/Principal	Professor Dr. Bipinpal Das, former principal and Deputy Foreign Minister of India in Second Indira Gandhi ministry		
18.	Professor Dr. Joy Shankar Hazarika		Student and professor/principal	Dr. Joy Shankar Hazarika was the longest serving principal of Darrang, from 2006-2021. He is a ward commissioner in Tezpur Municipal Board.		
19.	Bibek Das		Student	Bibek Das is the Assam State General Secretary of Communist Party of India (Marxist–Leninist) Liberation.		
20.	Atanu Bhuyan		Student	Atanu Bhuyan is a journalist and TV anchor.		
21.	Nitumoni Saikia		Student	Nitumoni Saikia is a journalist and TV anchor.		
22.	Paresh Nath		Student	Paresh Nath is the current convenor of Assam State Janata Dal (United).		
23.	Justice Iqbal Ahmed Ansari		Student	Justice Iqbal Ahmed Ansari (born 29 October 1954) is the incumbent chairperson of Punjab State Human Rights Commission and former chief justice of Patna High Court.		
24.	Rai Bahadur Padmanath Gohain Baruah		President	Padmanath Gohain Baruah (Assamese: পদ্মনাথ গোহাঞি বৰুৱা; 1871–1946) was the first president of Asam Sahitya Sabha and a prominent name in the early part of modern Assamese literature. He was a novelist, poet, dramatist of excellence, analyst and a thought provoking writer. He was the 1st Ahom MLC in Assam Legislative Council and the 1st non-European chairman of Tezpur Municipal Board. He was the 1st president of Darrang College.	Rai Bahadur	
25.	Professor Kamakhya Prasad Tripathy		Professor/principal	Kamakhya Prasad Tripathy was the 1st principal of Darrang College and 1st Head of English Department. He was a former Finance Minister of Assam from 1957-1962. He was also a member of 1st Lok Sabha and MLA of Biswanath Assembly constituency.		Department of English
26.	Ranjit Dutta		Student	Ranjit Dutta (born 24 January 1957) is a Member of Parliament from Sonitpur Lok Sabha constituency. He was previously a member of Assam Legislative Assembly from Behali constituency. He was a minister in the Sarbananda Sonowal-led government from 2016 to 2021.		Pre-university (higher secondary)
27.	Prafulla Goswami		Student	Prafulla Goswami was a 2 time member of Assam Legislative Assembly from Barchalla Assembly constituency.		
28.	Biswadev Sarma		Student	Biswadev Sarma was a 4 time member of Assam Legislative Assembly from Tezpur North Assembly Constituency (1952-1957) and Balipara Assembly Constituency (1957-1972).		
29.	Zoii Nath Sarmah		Student			

== Faculty ==
Sr.no.	Name	Portrait		
1.	Amalendu Guha			
1.	Amalendu Guha		2.	Jiban Bora

== See also ==
- List of accredited colleges in Assam
