= Ellora Vigyan Mancha =

Indian science advocacy organization

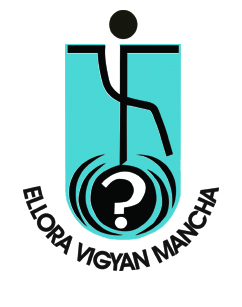
- Abbreviation: EVM
- Named after: Ellora Roychoudhury
- Formation: 15 May 2004 (22 years ago)
- Registration no.: RS/KAM/240/A-4/696 of 2006
- Headquarters: Guwahati, Assam
- Affiliations: All India People's Science Network (AIPSN)
- Awards: Hemkosh Pran Devananda Baruah Samaj Chetana Award; Maanavata Award
- Website: www.elloravigyan.in

Ellora Vigyan Mancha ("Ellora Science Forum") is a non-profit, non-governmental organization established in May 2004 in Assam, India. It seeks to spread scientific temper and to fight superstition and blind belief, launch campaigns and movement for health awareness, climate change, encourage blood donation/ eye donation/ other human organ(s) donation/ whole body donation after death for transfusion, transplantation or medical research, and to Instill a sense of fraternity in people through selfless humanitarian service.

== History ==
It was founded in memory of Ellora Roychoudhury, who died in 2003 after battling long with cancer and donated her body to the Gauhati Medical College and Hospital for research. She is the first woman in North East India to donate her body for medical sciences. In a public meeting attended by eminent personalities held on 15 May 2004, at Assam Textile Institute, Guwahati the Ellora Vigyan Mancha was formally came into existence.

== Organization ==
Ellora Vigyan Mancha has 44 branches across Assam. The branches in districts of Tinsukia, Dibrugarh, Sivasagar, Jorhat, Sonitpur, Nagaon, Kamrup, Kamrup (Metro), Nalbari, Goalpara, Barpeta, Darrang, Bongaigaon etc. are fairly active.

== Prominent body donors (deceased) ==
Ellora Vigyan Mancha works for body donation, organ donation, health awareness, against superstition and blind beliefs. As of August 2022, 158 bodies were donated to different government medical colleges in Assam.

The list of body donors includes noted historian Amalendu Guha, Sahitya Akademi Award winner Purabi Bormudoi, noted Assamese Singer and younger sister of Bhupen Hazarika Sudakshina Sarma, actor Meera Biswas, former MLAs (Member of the Legislative Assembly (India)) Bipin Hazarika, Nizamuddin khan, Noted writer Anima Guha, eminent Assamese poet and Sahitya Akademi Award winner Suchibrata Roychoudhury, writer Tushaprabha Kalita etc. who have donated their bodies for research.

The Ellora Vigyan Mancha extends help to organs and body donors (after death) and sends to Gauhati Medical College and Hospital, Assam Medical College, Tezpur Medical College and Hospital, Barpeta Medical College and Jorhat Medical College and Hospital.

== Awards and recognitions ==
On 1 May 2018, on the occasion of Hemchandra Barua Memorial Day, the Ellora Vigyan Mancha was awarded with Hemkosh Pran Devananda Baruah Samaj Chetana Award by Sadin-Pratidin group. Again in May 2022, Bhabaprasad Chaliha Trust conferred prestigious Maanavata award to the organization. Apart from these, the Organization has received various other recognitions such as appreciation award from Assam AIDS Control Society for organizing blood donation campaigns across Assam.

== Publications ==
Ellora Vigyan Mancha has been publishing its quarterly journal the ‘Samikshan' regularly since the last Conference in October, 2016. Moreover, it has published few booklets on Health and Superstition, Astrology and Astronomy, etc. apart from two books on Hemchandra Barua and Ancient Indian Science (translated).

== Major days observed ==
- 15 May – Foundation Day
- 20 August – National Scientific Temper Day (Martyrdom day of Dr. Narendra Dabholkar)
- 10 December – Anti Superstition Day (Birth anniversary of Hemchandra Barua)
