= Pranati Phukan =

21st Deputy Speaker of the Assam Legislative Assembly

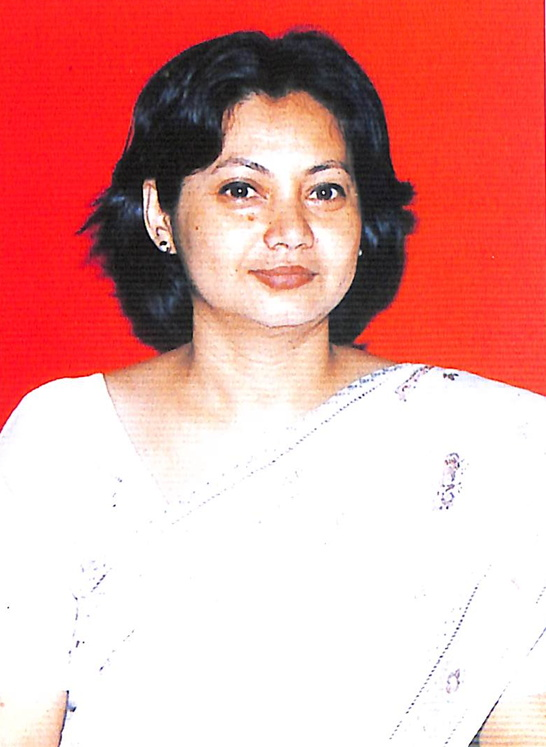
- Phukan in 2006

Cabinet Minister, Assam
- In office 30 May 2011 – 26 January 2015
- Chief Minister: Tarun Gogoi
- Departments: Handloom, Textiles and Sericulture; Cultural Affairs
- Preceded by: Pranab Gogoi (Handloom); Bharat Narah (Cultural Affairs)
- Succeeded by: Bismita Gogoi

Deputy Speaker of the Assam Legislative Assembly
- In office 31 May 2006 – 16 May 2011
- Speaker: Tanka Bahadur Rai
- Preceded by: Tanka Bahadur Rai
- Succeeded by: Bhimananda Tanti

Minister of State, Assam
- In office 7 June 2002 – 6 July 2004
- Chief Minister: Tarun Gogoi
- Departments: Revenue; Cultural Affairs

Member, Assam Legislative Assembly
- In office 12 June 1996 – 19 May 2016
- Preceded by: Sasha Kamal Handique
- Succeeded by: Naren Sonowal
- Constituency: Naharkatia

Personal details
- Born: 24 April 1963 (age 63) Sivasagar
- Party: Indian National Congress (1996-present)
- Spouse: Hari Phukan (m. 1984, died)
- Children: 2
- Parent(s): Dhamaswar Chetia (father); Kaushayla Chetia (mother)
- Education: Gargaon College

Pranati Phukan (née Chetia; born 24 April 1963) is a former minister, deputy speaker and member of Assam Legislative Assembly.

== Early life and education ==
Phukan was born on the 24 April 1963 in Sivasagar. She is the daughter of the late Dhamaswar Chetia and Kaushyla Chetia. She is from Salibasa, Dibrugarh. She completed her Bachelor of Arts in Political Science from Gargaon College, Dibrugarh University in 1983. She participated in plays during her student life.

== Political career ==
Phukan was the Indian National Congress candidate for the Naharkatia seat in 1996, the same constituency her late husband had contested but lost to Sashakamal Handique in 1991. She defeated the incumbent member Sashakamal Handique. She polled 26333 votes, 44.12% of the constituency, defeating Handique by 30035 votes.

She was again the Indian National Congress candidate for the Naharkatia seat in 2001. She polled 42765 votes, 65.94% of the constituency, defeating her nearest opponent by 30035 votes. She was made Minister of State for Revenue and Cultural Affairs on 7 June 2002 and served until the 6 July 2004.

In the 2006 Assam Legislative Assembly Election, she was reelected as the Indian National Congress candidate for Naharkatia. She received 40065 votes, defeating her nearest opponent by 19736 votes.

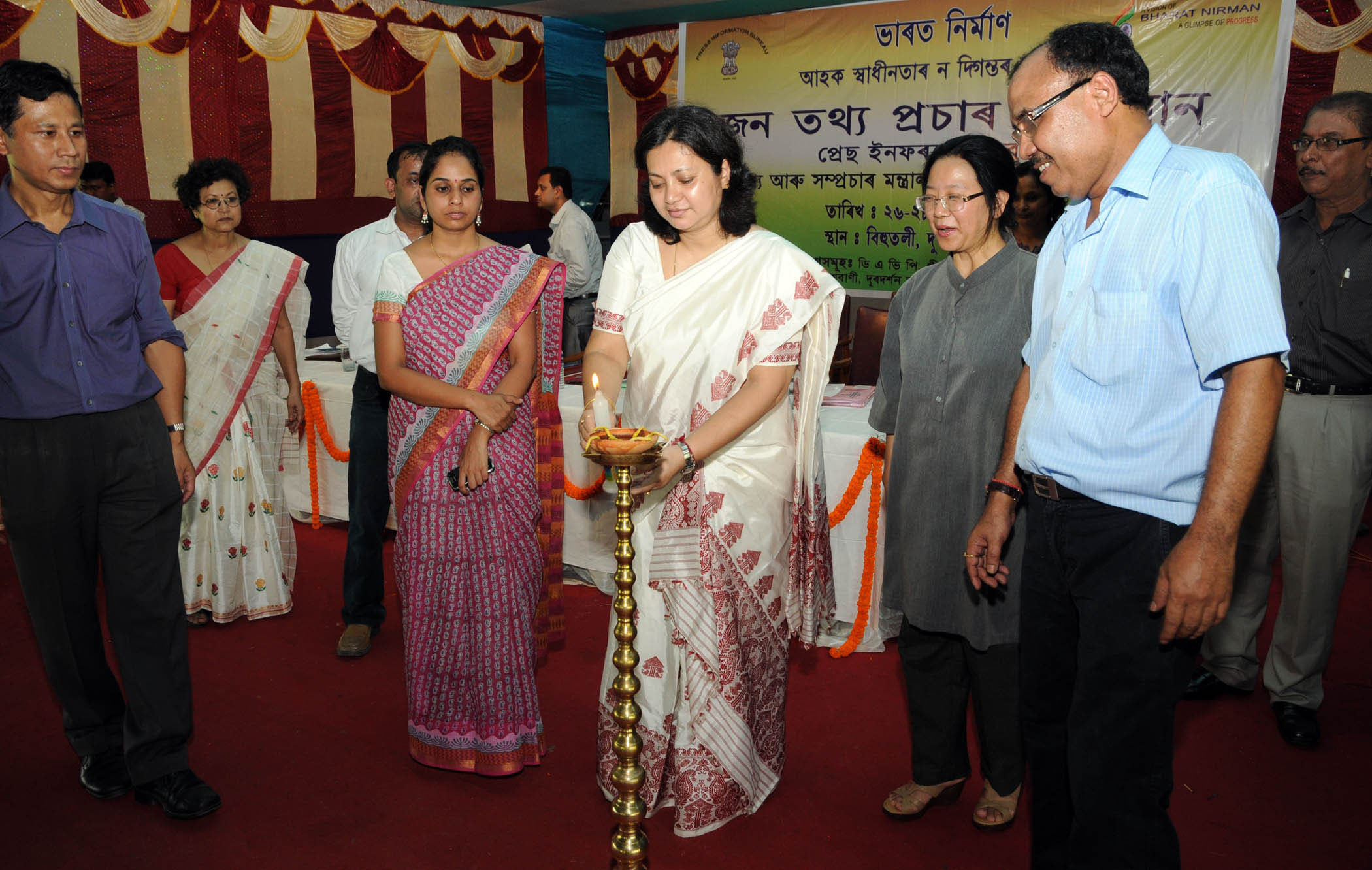
Phukan inaugurating the Public Information Campaign on Bharat Nirman in Duliajan on 26 September 2012

On 31 May 2006, she was unanimously elected Deputy Speaker of Assam Legislative Assembly, becoming the first woman to hold the office. She was led to the chair by Speaker Tanka Bahadur Rai, Chief Minister Tarun Gogoi and Leader of the Opposition Brindabon Goswami. She served until 16 May 2011.

In the 2011 Assam Legislative Assembly election, she was reelected for Naharkatia. She polled 35373 votes 41.58% of the total vote and she defeated her nearest opponent by 14397 votes.

=== Culture Minister ===
On 30 May 2011 she was made Minister for Sericulture, Handlooms, Textile and Cultural Affairs in the Tarun Gogoi cabinet. During her time as minister, she oversaw the consideration of the Charaideo Maidam as a UNESCO World heritage site.

She resigned from her post on 19 January 2015, ahead of a cabinet reshuffle in the Tarun Gogoi cabinet. She was later succeeded by Bismita Gogoi.

=== Post-ministerial career ===
In the 2016 Assam Legislative Assembly election, she again sought reelection for Naharkatia. When asked about her seeking of reelection, she stated "the decision to contest was not an easy one … It was because of the insistence of my supporters that I could gather the courage to contest. " When asked about the likelihood of her reelection, she stated "the biggest achievement of my tenure was the upgradation of Naharkatia as a sub-division." She received 42520 votes, losing to AGP candidate Naren Sonowal by 3531 votes.

In the 2021 Assam Legislative Assembly Election, she was again the Indian National Congress candidate for Naharkatia. She received 32292 votes, placing second to BJP candidate Taranga Gogoi.

== Personal life ==
Phukan married the late Hari Phukan in 1984. They had a son and a daughter. Her hobbies include music and social activities, she also enjoys social work, sports and travel. In her recreation time she likes listening to various types of classical music. She also has worked for Women & Children Welfare as well as Youth Organisations.

Her son, Rituraj Phukan, died in a boating accident in the Umgot river near Dawki, Meghalaya in 2010.
