= Naharkatia Assembly constituency =

Constituency of the Assam legislative assembly in India

Naharkatia
- Constituency No. 92 for the Assam Legislative Assembly

Constituency details
- Country: India
- Region: Northeast India
- State: Assam
- District: Dibrugarh
- Lok Sabha constituency: Dibrugarh
- Established: 1978
- Reservation: None

Naharkatia Assembly constituency is one of the 126 legislative assembly constituencies of Assam a north east state of India. Naharkatia is also part of Dibrugarh Lok Sabha constituency.

== Members of Legislative Assembly ==
Election	Member	Party affiliation
1978	Sasha Kamal Handique	Communist Party of India (Marxist)
1985	Kusumbar Tarai	Independent
1991	Sasha Kamal Handique	Communist Party of India (Marxist)
1996	Pranati Phukan	Indian National Congress
2000^	Pranati Phukan	Indian National Congress
2001	Pranati Phukan	Indian National Congress
2006	Pranati Phukan	Indian National Congress
2011	Pranati Phukan	Indian National Congress
2016	Naren Sonowal	Asom Gana Parishad
2021	Taranga Gogoi	Bharatiya Janata Party

^ Indicates Bye-Elections

== Election results ==
=== 2026 ===
2026 Assam Legislative Assembly election: Naharkatia
Party	Candidate	Votes	%	±%
BJP	Taranga Gogoi	87768	70.43	
INC	Pranati Phukan	25486	20.45	
JMM	Sanjoy Bagh	7560	6.07	
NOTA	NOTA	2121	1.7	
Margin of victory		62282		
Turnout		124613		
Rejected ballots				
Registered electors				
BJP hold		Swing		

=== 2016 ===
2016 Assam Legislative Assembly election: Naharkatia
Party	Candidate	Votes	%	±%
AGP	Naren Sonowal	46,051	46.75	+22.09
INC	Pranati Phukan	44,520	43.16	+1.58
CPI(M)	Suresh Chandra Deka	4,026	4.08	+0.91
Independent	Mohan Nag	2,708	2.74	N/A
Independent	Mahendra Dhadumiya	783	0.79	N/A
JCP	Sadananda Das	697	0.70	N/A
NOTA	None of the above	1,719	1.74	N/A
Majority		3,531	3.59	−13.33
Turnout		98,504	83.70	+10.57
AGP gain from INC		Swing		

=== 2011 ===
2011 Assam Legislative Assembly election: Naharkatia
Party	Candidate	Votes	%	±%
INC	Pranati Phukan	35,373	41.58	
AGP	Naren Sonowal	20,976	24.66	
BJP	Pradip Buragohain	18,917	22.24	
CPI(M)	Sasha Kamal Handique	2,699	3.17	
NCP	Kartik Tanti	2,498	2.94	
AITC	Tirtha Gogoi	1,714	2.01	
SUCI(C)	Mahendra Dhadumia	1,554	1.83	
AIUDF	Imranuddin Ahmed	1,339	1.57	
Majority		14,397	16.92	
Turnout		85,070	73.13	
INC hold		Swing		

== See also ==
- Naharkatia
- List of constituencies of Assam Legislative Assembly
