= Tanka Bahadur Rai =

20th Speaker of the Assam Legislative Assembly

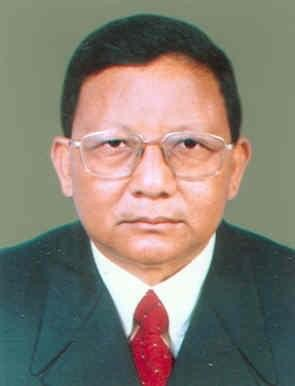
- Official portrait

Speaker of the Assam Legislative Assembly
- In office 29 May 2006 – 19 May 2011
- Deputy: Pranati Phukan
- Preceded by: Prithibi Majhi
- Succeeded by: Pranab Kumar Gogoi

Cabinet Minister, Assam
- In office 30 May 2011 – 26 January 2015
- Chief Minister: Tarun Gogoi
- Departments: Planning and Development; Judicial, Legislative and Law; Pension and Public Grievances
- Preceded by: Prithibi Majhi (Planning); Pranab Kumar Gogoi (Judicial, Law)
- Succeeded by: Ajanta Neog (Planning, Judicial); Sarat Barkotoky (P&PG)

Deputy Speaker of the Assam Legislative Assembly
- In office 3 April 2002 – 14 May 2006
- Speaker: Prithibi Majhi
- Preceded by: Renupoma Rajkhowa
- Succeeded by: Pranati Phukan

Member, Assam Legislative Assembly
- In office 13 May 2001 – 19 May 2016
- Preceded by: Prafulla Goswami
- Succeeded by: Ganesh Kumar Limbu
- Constituency: Barchalla

Personal details
- Born: 14 October 1950 (age 75) Singri
- Party: Indian National Congress
- Spouse: Chandra Maya Rai (m. 1974)
- Children: 2
- Parent: Pancha Bahadur Rai (Father) Dhansiri Rai (Mother)
- Occupation: Politician

Tanka Bahadur Rai (born 14 October 1950) is an Indian National Congress politician from the state of Assam. He was a Member of the Assam Legislative Assembly from the Indian National Congress for Barchalla constituency. He served first as deputy speaker and then as speaker of Assam Legislative Assembly. He was also a minister in the Tarun Gogoi cabinet.

== Early life and education ==
Tanka Bahadur Rai was born on 14 October 1950 to the late Pancha Bahadur Rai and the late Dhansiri Rai in Singri. He completed HSLC in 1967, Pre University (1968), B.A (Distinction) from Darrang College in 1971 and M.A (Ist Class) from Gauhati University in 1973 and an LLB from Guwahati University Law College in 1978.

== Early career ==
Rai was the Organising Secretary of Darrang Nepali Students Union from 1969-1971. He was a member of the Executive Committee, Darrang College Students Union from 1970-1971. He was also an Executive Committee Member (Departmental Representative) of Post Graduate Students Union, Gauhati University from 1972-1973. He was also General Secretary of the Political Science Society, Gauhati University from 1972-1973.

Rai was lecturer, Lok Nayak Omiya Kr.Das College, Dhekiajuli, Sonitpur, Assam from July 1973 to September 1973. He was then a Lecturer at Kohima College, Kohima, Nagaland from 1973 to 1979 while also being a part time lecture from 1978-1981 at Kohima Law college. He has been an advocate at Kohima, Tezpur and Guwahati since 1979. He was President of Kohima Bar Association 1987-1988. He was also President of the Reception Committee of the Convention of North East Gorkha Students Federation held at Tezpur, Assam on 23,24 & 25 November 1997. He has been General Secretary, Assam Gorkha Sammelan since 1997.

== Political career ==
Rai was elected to Assam Legislative Assembly on 13 May 2001, having been the Indian National Congress candidate for the constituency of Barchalla. He received 26567 votes, 35.79% of the total vote and he defeated the incumbent MLA for Barchalla, Prafulla Goswami, by 9112 votes. He was made Deputy Speaker of Assam Legislative Assembly on 3 April 2002 and served until 14 May 2006.

In the 2006 Assam Legislative Assembly election, Rai was reelected as the Indian National Congress candidate for Barchalla. He polled 34461 votes, defeating AGP candidate Brindabon Goswami by 922 votes. He was unanimously elected Speaker of the 12th Assam Legislative Assembly. His election was announced by G C Langthasa. He was escorted to the Speaker's chair by Chief Minister Tarun Gogoi, AGP legislative party leader Brindaban Goswami and BJP leader Mison Ranjan Das. Later all party leaders of the Assembly congratulated him over his election.

On 5 March 2010, 50 Opposition legislators blocked Rai from entering the Assembly for his alleged bias to the Congress-coalition.

In the 2011 Assam Legislative Assembly Election, Rai was again reelected as the Indian National Congress candidate for Barchalla. He received 47270 votes, 48.19% of the total vote. He defeated his nearest opponent by 17574 votes.

=== Ministership ===
He was made Minister for Planning and Development, Judicial, Legislative, Pension & Public Grievance under Chief Minister Tarun Gogoi on 30 May 2011 in the Third Tarun Gogoi cabinet.

On 4 November 2011 he sanctioned 60 crore under the Non-Lapsable Central Pool of Resources for the construction of a bridge.

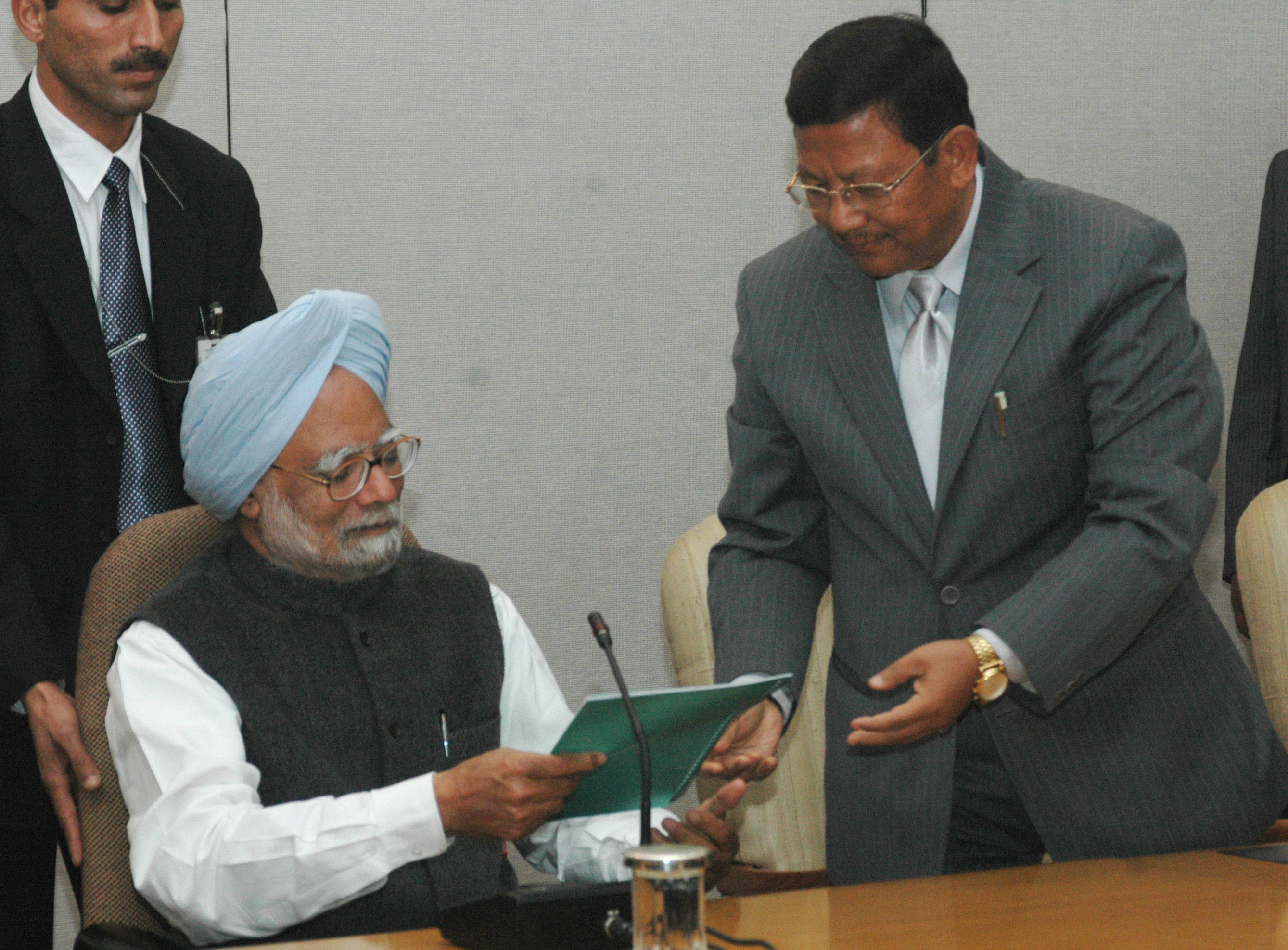
Rai with Prime Minister Manmohan Singh in New Delhi on 1 February 2007, during his tenure as Speaker

On 20 October 2013, Rai along with the Assam Chief Secretary, the Assam DGP attended the swearing-in ceremony of the Chief Justice of Gauhati High Court, Abhay Manohar Sapre.

He was one of 11 cabinet ministers who resigned following a cabinet reshuffle.

=== Post-ministerial career ===
In the 2016 Assam Legislative Assembly election, Rai sought reelection. He received 30230 votes, being defeated by BJP candidate Ganesh Kumar Limbu by 23682 votes.

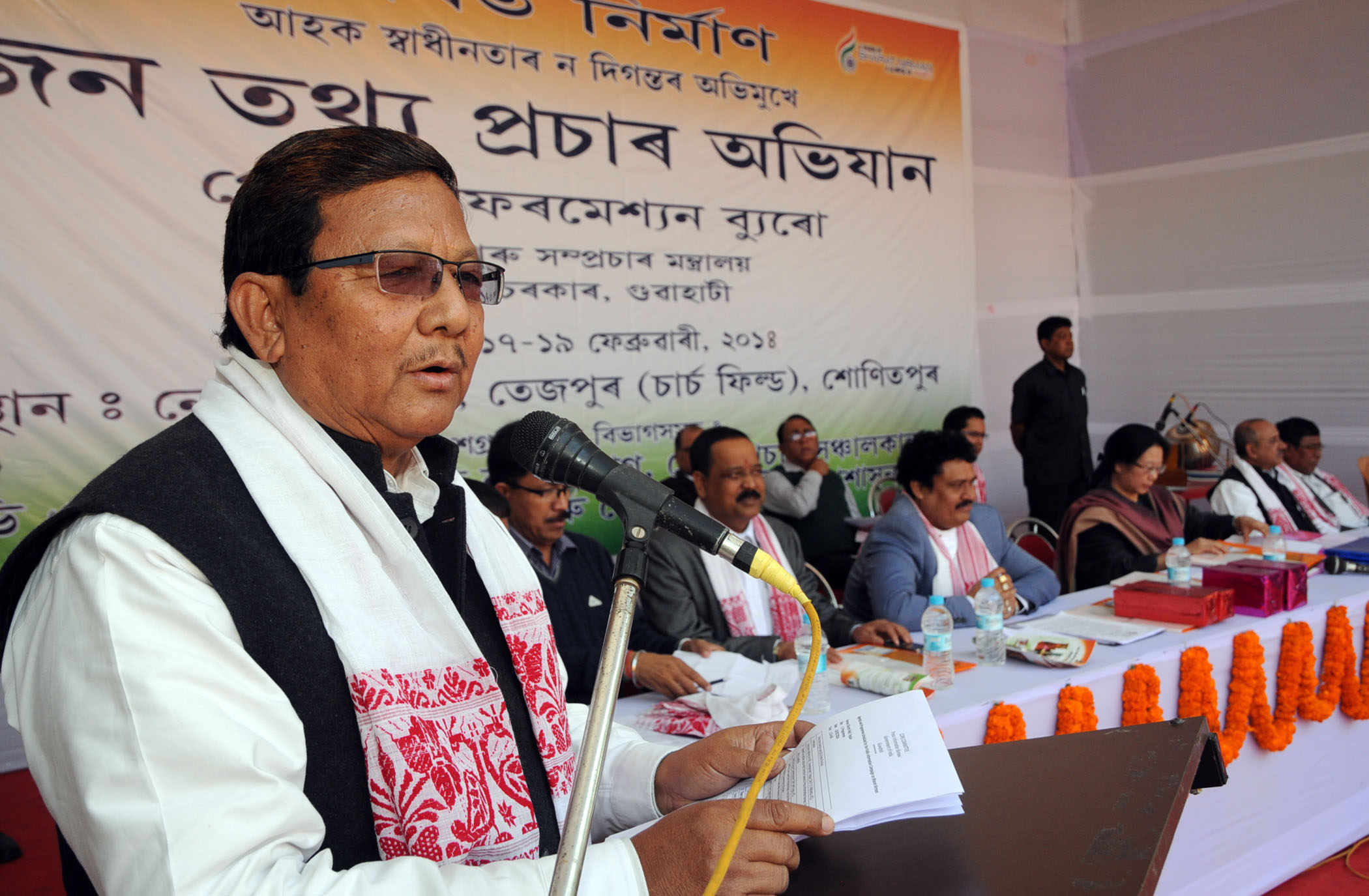
Tanka Bahadur Rai as Planning and Development minister in 2014, addressing a Public Information Campaign

== Personal life ==
He is married to Chandra Maya Rai and they have 1 son and 1 daughter. He enjoys reading, travelling and sports.
