= Sudakshina Sarma =

Indian singer (1934–2023)

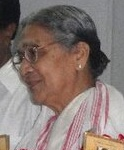
- Born: Nirupama Hazarika; 8 August 1934; Guwahati, Assam Province, British India
- Died: 3 July 2023 (aged 88); Guwahati, Assam, India
- Other name: Queenie Hazarika
- Years active: 1944–2023
- Spouse: Dilip Sarma (m. 1954; died 2008)
- Children: 3
- Family: Bhupen Hazarika (brother); Jayanta Hazarika (brother)
- Awards: Sangeet Natak Akademi Award (2002)

Sudakshina Sarma,; née Nirupama Hazarika; 8 August 1934 – 3 July 2023) was an Indian Assamese language singer and musician. In a career spanning over seven decades, Sarma recorded songs in a variety of genres across Assamese music spanning both classical and modern including Borgeet, Kamrupi Lokgeet, and Goalpariya Lokogeet. She also popularized Jyoti Sangeet, songs written by Assamese writer and lyricist Jyoti Prasad Agarwala and also Rabindra Sangeet.

Sarma received the Sangeet Natak Akademi Award in 2002 for her contributions to Assamese music.

== Early life ==
Sarma was born Nirupama Hazarika, in the Bharalumukh neighborhood of Guwahati to Shantipriya and Neelakantha Hazarika in a family of ten children, where she was fourth. Her elder brother, Bhupen Hazarika and younger brother, Jayanta Hazarika were also musicians. She was given the nickname Queen in her childhood, and was commonly referred to as Queenie Hazarika during her musical career.

Sarma completed her schooling from Pan Bazaar high school and later studied at the Handique Girls College.

Her older brother, Bhupendra, greatly influenced her artistic growth, and exposed her to various Assamese cultural icons such as Rupkonwar Jyotiprasad Agarwala, Bishnu Prasad Rabha, and Phani Sarma among others.

== Career ==
Sarma's career started when she was 10, when she traveled to Kolkata to record two songs composed by Bishnu Prasad Rabha. That same year, she went on to record two more songs, including one written by her father, that would become hits.

According to Sarma, a special highlight early in her career was when she sang "E Joi Roghunandan" (transl. this victory of Rama, the son of Raghu) for Mahatma Gandhi's visit to Guwahati in 1946, upon request from Gopinath Bordoloi. Sarma also sang "Prithibir Shirot Bajrapat Porile" (transl. a sudden devastation strikes the world), a song composed by her brother Bhupen Hazarika, when Gandhi's ashes were immersed in the Brahmaputra River after his assassination in 1948.

Along with her husband, Sarma worked on popularizing Jyoti Sangeet, songs written by Assamese writer and lyricist Jyoti Prasad Agarwala. The couple also worked on Rabindra Sangeet, songs written by composer and Indian nationalist Rabindranath Tagore. She partnered with her husband to record several albums including Kamalkuwari More Praneswari, Moyu Bane Jao Swamihe, Nahar Phule Nushuwai, Rati Puwaelre Kuruwai Pare Rao, and Ur Ur Ur Neel Akashat.

In a career spanning over seven decades, Sarma recorded songs in a variety of genres across Assamese music spanning both classical and modern including Borgeet, Kamrupi Lokgeet, and Goalpariya Lokogeet. She was an artist with All India Radio's Guwahati station. As a playback singer, Sarma recorded songs for Assamese movies including Maniram Dewan, Chikmik Bijuli, Pargaat, Abooj Bedona, and Hepah. Some of her popular songs included Jetuka Bolere, Kotha Aru Xur, and Sharatkalor Rati.

Sarma received the Sangeet Natak Akademi Award in 2002, an award that she shared with her husband, for her contributions to Assamese music and Jyoti Sangeet. The couple held music workshops across the country. Sarma and her husband were also members of the Assam unit of Indian People's Theatre Association.

== Personal life and death ==
Sarma married composer and musician Dilip Sarma in 1954. She changed her name from Nirupama Hazarika to Sudakshina Sarma after her wedding. The couple had two sons and a daughter. Her husband and two sons predeceased her, with her husband dying in 2008. Sarma's elder brother was the Assamese musician Bhupen Hazarika. Her younger brother Jayanta Hazarika was also a musician.

Sarma died in Guwahati on 3 July 2023, at the age of 88. She was undergoing treatment for pneumonia at the time of her death. Sarma had partnered with Ellora Vigyan Mancha, an Assamese NGO, to have her organs donated after her death.

== See also ==
- Sudakshina Sarma on the Assamese language Wikipedia
