= Dipak C. Jain =

Co-President and Global Advisor of China Europe International Business School

Dipak Jain
- Born: Dipak Chand Jain; 9 June 1957 (age 68); Tezpur, Assam, India
- Education: Darrang College, Gauhati University (BS, MS); The University of Texas at Dallas (PhD)

Dipak Chand Jain is an Indian-American statistician and marketing scholar. He is co-president and Global Advisor of China Europe International Business School. He previously was the director (dean) of Sasin Graduate Institute of Business Administration of Chulalongkorn University in Bangkok, Thailand. He stepped down in 2017.

== Early life and education ==
Jain was born on 9 June 1957 in the town of Tezpur in Assam, a state in north-eastern part of India. He did his schooling from Rastrabhasa Hindi School at Tezpur. He went on to earn his bachelor's degree in statistics (hons.) in 1976 from Darrang College, Tezpur (affiliated with Gauhati University) and his master's degree in statistics in 1978 from Gauhati University in India. He taught at Gauhati University for the next five years before coming to US to pursue his PhD in marketing at the University of Texas at Dallas under the direction of Frank Bass.

== Academic career ==
He is also INSEAD Chaired Professor of Marketing. He had served as Dean of INSEAD since his appointment from May 2011 to March 2013. He was Dean of Northwestern University’s Kellogg School of Management from 2001 to 2009.

He was also Sandy and Morton Goldman Professor of Entrepreneurial Studies & Professor of Marketing at the Kellogg School of Management, where he had been a member of the faculty since 1987. Jain has been a visiting professor of marketing since 1989 at the Sasin Graduate Institute of Business Administration at Chulalongkorn University in Bangkok.

Jain’s areas of research include the marketing of high-tech products; market segmentation and competitive market structure analysis; cross-cultural issues in global product diffusion; new product diffusion; and forecasting models. He has had more than 50 articles published in leading academic journals.

A marketing expert trained in mathematics and statistics, Jain assumed leadership of the school in 2001, after serving for five years as the school's associate dean for academic affairs working with Dean Donald P. Jacobs.

After 13 years in the Dean's office, Jain stepped down on 1 September 2009 to devote more time towards family and teaching commitments. From March 2011, he took office as Dean of INSEAD, one of the world's most prestigious business schools, with campuses in France, Singapore and Abu Dhabi.

== Non-academic positions ==
Jain also serves as an Independent Director on the Board of Indian Conglomerate Reliance Industries Limited which is also the largest refiner in the world at a single location. He has served as a consultant to Microsoft, Novartis, American Express, Sony, Nissan, Eli Lilly and Company, and Hyatt International. He also serves as a member of the board of directors of Deere & Company and Northern Trust Corporation. He is also a former director at United Airlines, Hartmarx Corporation and Peoples Energy.

Jain has served as the departmental editor for the journal Management Science, the area editor for Marketing Science and associate editor for the Journal of Business and Economic Statistics. He is also a former member of the editorial board of the Journal of Marketing Research

== Awards and honors ==
Dean Jain’s teaching honors include:

- Assam Saurabh, 2nd highest civilian award of Assam, 2021
- Pravasi Bharatiya Samman 2004;
- The Sidney Levy Award for Excellence in Teaching in 1995;
- The John D.C. Little Best Paper Award in 1991;
- Kraft research professorships in 1989-90 and 1990–91;
- The Beatrice research professorship in 1987-88;
- The Outstanding Educator Award from the State of Assam in India in 1982;
- The Gold Medal for the Best Post-Graduate of the Year from Gauhati University in India in 1978;
- The Gold Medal for the Best Graduate of the Year from Darrang College in Assam in India in 1976;
- The Gold Medal from Jaycees International in 1976;
- The Youth Merit Award from Rotary International in 1976; and
- The Jawaharlal Nehru Merit Award, Government of India in 1976.

== Personal life ==
He is married to Sushant Jain and they have three children.
