= Ganesh Kumar Limbu =

Indian politician

Member of the Assam Legislative Assembly for Barchalla
- Incumbent
- Assumed office 2016
- Preceded by: Tanka Bahadur Rai

Personal details
- Party: Bharatiya Janata Party
- Profession: Business

Ganesh Kumar Limbu is a Bharatiya Janata Party politician from Assam, India. Limbu was born to Late Padam Bahadur Limbu. He has been elected in Assam Legislative Assembly election in 2016 from Barchalla constituency.
