= Ellora Roychoudhury =

Indian social worker and activist

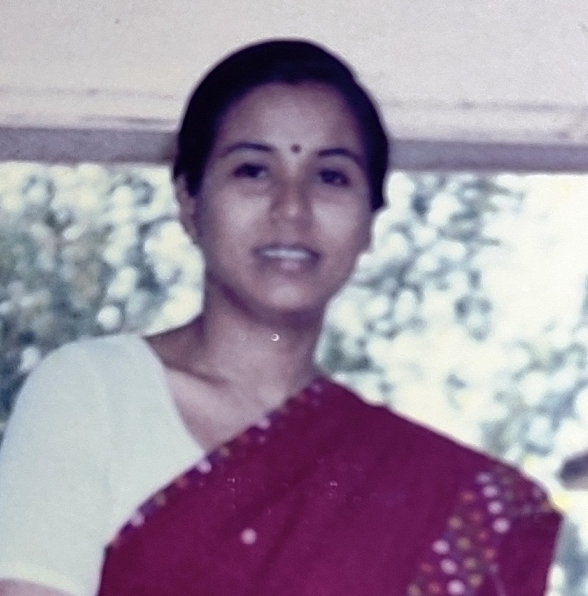
- Ellora Roychoudhury
- Born: 1 April 1969; Mangaldai, Assam, India
- Died: 15 May 2003 (aged 34); Guwahati, Assam, India
- Education: Bachelor's degree, Diploma in Textile Technology
- Occupations: Social worker, Activist
- Known for: First woman from Northeast India to donate eyes and body posthumously.
- Website: elloravigyan.in

Signature
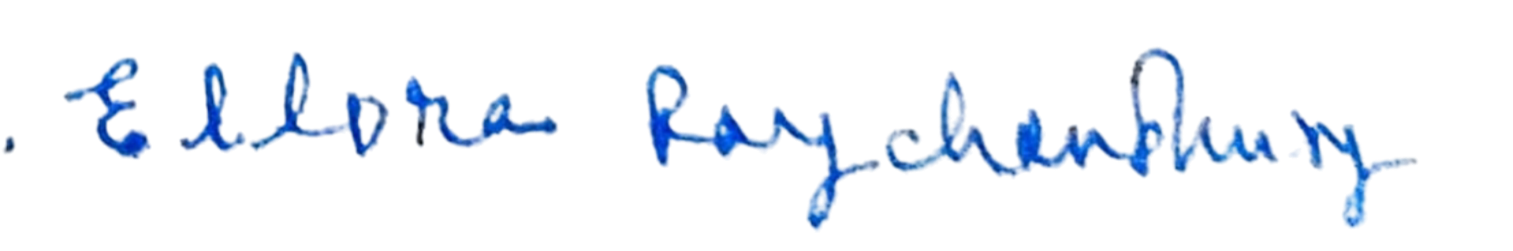

Ellora Roychoudhury (Assamese: ইলোৰা ৰায়চৌধুৰী; 1 April 1969 – 15 May 2003) was an Indian social worker, activist, and the first woman from Northeast India to posthumously donate her eyes and body. In her memory, the organization Ellora Vigyan Mancha was established to promote scientific temper and combat superstition and blind beliefs.

== Early life and education ==
Ellora Roychoudhury was born on 1 April 1969 at Mangaldoi, Darrang district, Assam to Hemanta Roychoudhury, a descendant of Ambikagiri Roychoudhury and Bina Roychoudhury. Her family had a strong legacy of social and cultural contributions.

== Activism ==
Ellora Roychoudhury was involved in progressive and democratic student movements from her school days. During the Assam Agitation (1979–1985), she faced numerous challenges and persecution from extremist nationalist and separatist groups. In 1985, she became a member of the Communist Party of India (Marxist) and later joined the All India Democratic Women's Association after her marriage.

She played a pivotal role in promoting women's literacy and empowerment. In Guwahati's Hedayetpur area, she established a literacy center and tirelessly worked to educate underprivileged women. Ellora was also an active member and leader of the Assam State Employees' Federation.

== Death and legacy ==
First page of Last will signed by Ellora Roychoudhury two months before her death, pledging her body for medical research.

Ellora Roychoudhury died on 15 May 2003 at the age of 34 after battling cancer. Her decision to donate her eyes and body posthumously became a groundbreaking act in Assam and the Northeast, where such practices were relatively uncommon. Inspired by an article she read about posthumous body and organ donation, Ellora signed her last will on 17 March 2003, donating her body to the Gauhati Medical College for medical research. Hours after her death, her eyes were donated to the Sankaradeva Netralaya in Guwahati, with the consent of her husband, Isfaqur Rahman.
