= Tezpur Assembly constituency =

Constituency of the Assam legislative assembly in India

Tezpur
- Constituency No. 67 for the Assam Legislative Assembly

Constituency details
- Country: India
- Region: Northeast India
- State: Assam
- District: Sonitpur
- Lok Sabha constituency: Sonitpur
- Established: 1951
- Reservation: None

Member of Legislative Assembly
- 16th Assam Legislative Assembly
- Incumbent Prithriraj Rava
- Party: AGP
- Alliance: NDA
- Elected year: 2026

Tezpur Assembly constituency is one of the 126 assembly constituencies of Assam a north east state of India. Tezpur is also part of Sonitpur Lok Sabha constituency.

Most Successful parties from Tezpur Vidhan Sabha
1. Indian National Congress (9 Times) (52.0%)
2. Asom Gana Parishad ( 5 Times) (30.0%)
3. Janata Party ( 1 Time) (6.00%)
4. Bishnu Prasad Rabha(Ind) ( 1 Time) (6.00%)
5. Brindaban Goswami(Ind)( 1 Time) (6.00%)
6. 0.00%
7. 0.00%
8. 0.00%

== Members of Legislative Assembly ==
Most Successful M.L.A.s from Tezpur Vidhan Sabha
1. Brindaban Goswami (AGP) (5 Times) 30 (28.3%)
2. Kamala Prasad Agarwala (INC) (3 Times) 17 (16.0%)
3. Bijoy Chandra Bhagavati (INC) (1 Time) 6 (5.66%)
4. Bishnu Prasad Rabha (Ind) (1 Time) 6 (5.66%)
5. Rajen Borthakur (INC) (1 Time) 6 (5.66%)
6. Prithiraj Rava (AGP) (1 Time) 6 (5.66%)
7. Others (5 Times) 35 (33.0%)
8. 0 (0.00%)

=== Tezpur Assembly Constituency ===
Term	Member of Legislative Assembly	Party	Margin of Victory
Known as Tezpur North & Tezpur South before Delimitation(1952–1957)
1952	Biswadev Sharma	Indian National Congress	
1952	Kamala Prasad Agarwala	Indian National Congress	
Known as Tezpur after Delimitation(1957 till date)
1957	Kamala Prasad Agarwala	Indian National Congress	
1962	Kamala Prasad Agarwala	Indian National Congress	
1967	Bishnu Prasad Rabha	Independent	373
1970^	Bijoy Chandra Bhagavati	Indian National Congress	
1972	Rabindra Kumar Goswami	Indian National Congress	4,149
1978	Jiban Bora	Janata Party	9,061
1983	Nabin Chandra Kath Hazarika	Indian National Congress	5,084
1985	Brindaban Goswami	Independent	20,120
1991	Bijit Saikia	Indian National Congress	10,531
1996	Brindaban Goswami	Asom Gana Parishad	1,883
2001	Brindaban Goswami	Asom Gana Parishad	994
2006	Brindaban Goswami	Asom Gana Parishad	8,424
2011	Rajen Borthakur	Indian National Congress	21,582
2016	Brindaban Goswami	Asom Gana Parishad	34,663
2021	Prithiraj Rava	Asom Gana Parishad	9,853

^By-poll

== Assembly election results ==
Most Successful 1st Runner-up parties from Tezpur Vidhan Sabha
1. Indian National Congress (8 Times) (48.0%)
2. Congress Socialist Party(2 Times) (11.0%)
3. Praja Socialist Party (1 Time) (6.00%)
4. Asom Gana Parishad (1 Time) (6.00%)
5. Samukya Socialist Party ( 1 Time) (6.00%)
6. Natun Asom Gana Parishad (1 Time) (6.00%)
7. Communist Party of India (1 Time) (6.00%)
8. Independents (2 Times) (11.0%)

=== 1952 ===
1952 Assam Legislative Assembly election: Tezpur North
Party	Candidate	Votes	%	±%
INC	Biswadev Sarma	12,849		
Socialist Party (India)	Surendra Mohan Choudhury	5,612		
Majority				
Turnout				
Registered electors				
INC win (new seat)				

1952 Assam Legislative Assembly election: Tezpur South
Party	Candidate	Votes	%	±%
INC	Kamala Prasad Agarwala	10,403		
Socialist Party (India)	Dambarudhar Bora	3,265		
Majority				
Turnout				
Registered electors				
INC win (new seat)				

=== 1957 ===
1957 Assam Legislative Assembly election: Tezpur
Party	Candidate	Votes	%	±%
INC	Kamala Prasad Agarwala	11,624		
Independent	Dr. Purna Narayan Sinha	4,033		
Majority				
Turnout				
Registered electors				
INC hold		Swing		

=== 1962 ===
1962 Assam Legislative Assembly election: Tezpur
Party	Candidate	Votes	%	±%
INC	Kamala Prasad Agarwala	10,763		
PSP	Golok Kakati	8,784		
Majority				
Turnout				
Registered electors				
INC hold		Swing		

=== 1967 ===
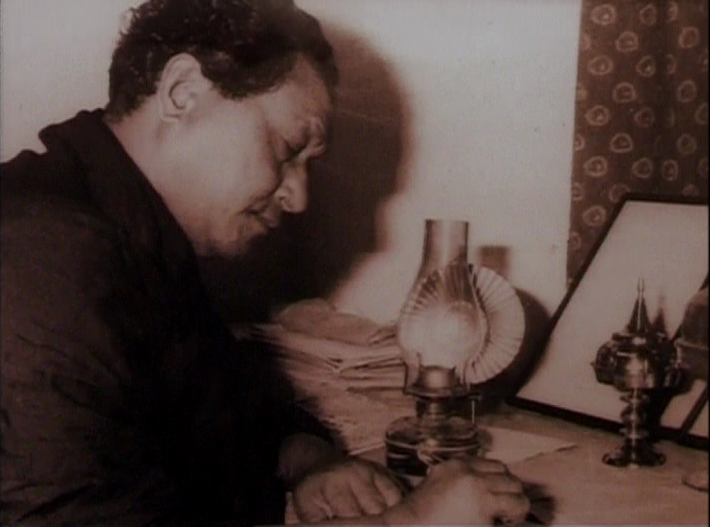
Bishnu Prasad Rabha

1967 Assam Legislative Assembly election: Tezpur
Party	Candidate	Votes	%	±%
Independent	Bishnu Prasad Rabha	10,337		
INC	B.C. Sharmah	9,964		
Majority				
Turnout			373	
Registered electors				
Independent gain from INC		Swing		

=== 1970 by-election ===
1970 Tezpur Legislative Assembly By-election: Tezpur
Party	Candidate	Votes	%	±%
INC	Bijoy Chandra Bhagavati	13,620		
CPI	R. Sarmah	4,535		
Majority				
Turnout		5,822	10.47	
Registered electors				
INC gain from Independent		Swing		

=== 1972 ===
1972 Assam Legislative Assembly election: Tezpur
Party	Candidate	Votes	%	±%
INC	Rabindra Kumar Goswami	12,724	44.98	
SSP	Purna Naryana Sinha	8,575	30.31	
Independent	Prafulla Kumar Goswami	5,798	20.5	
INC(O)	Mohiuddin	919	3.25	
Independent	Ramdhar Lall	191	0.68	
Independent	Pulin Choudhary	80	0.28	
Majority				
Turnout		28,287	56.35	
Registered electors				
INC hold		Swing		

=== 1978 ===
1978 Assam Legislative Assembly election: Tezpur
Party	Candidate	Votes	%	±%
JP	Jiban Bora	17,663	51.51	
INC	Sreekanth Sarmah	8,602	25.08	
Independent	Dilip Basu	4,490	13.09	
INC(I)	Nabin Chandra Kath Hazarika	2,314	6.75	
Independent	Mahendra Nath Bora	840	2.45	
Independent	Abhoy Charan Das	383	1.12	
Majority				
Turnout		34,292	66.07	
Registered electors				
JP gain from INC		Swing		

=== 1983 ===
1983 Assam Legislative Assembly election: Tezpur
Party	Candidate	Votes	%	±%
INC	Nabin Chandra Kath Hazarika	5,453	93.66	
Independent	Mahammad Ali	369	6.34	
Majority				
Turnout		5,822	10.47	
Registered electors				
INC gain from JP		Swing		

=== 1985 ===
1985 Assam Legislative Assembly election: Tezpur
Party	Candidate	Votes	%	±%
Independent	Brindaban Goswami	33,645	59.01	
INC	Naren Sarma	13,525	23.72	
Independent	Sayed Ali	7,903	13.06	
Independent	Sreekanth Sarma	1,758	3.08	
Independent	Golam Samdani	188	0.33	
Majority				
Turnout		57,019	82.2	
Registered electors				
Independent gain from INC		Swing		

=== 1991 ===
1991 Assam Legislative Assembly election: Tezpur
Party	Candidate	Votes	%	±%
INC	Bijit Saikia	26,646	45.02	
NAGP	Brindaban goswami	16,115	27.23	
Independent	Rupkamal Kakati	4,866	8.22	
Independent	Bapdhan Koch	4,281	7.21	
AGP	Dhananjay Das	2,464	416	
JD	Jibon Bora	2,394	4.05	
Independent	Paresh Nath	799	1.35	
Independent	Aradhana Das	564	0.95	
URC	Tabibhula Khan	507	0.95	
AJD	Tulshinarayan Mahata	261	0.44	
Independent	Miya Hussain	163	0.28	
Independent	Ajit Sarma	122	0.21	
Majority				
Turnout		59,182	71.24	
Registered electors				
INC gain from Independent		Swing		

=== 1996 ===
1996 Assam Legislative Assembly election: Tezpur
Party	Candidate	Votes	%	±%
AGP	Brindaban Goswami	30,706	44.68	
INC	Bizit Saikia	28,873	42.01	
BJP	Badan Chandra Lahar	7,510	10.93	
AIIC(T)	Punya Brata Goswami	1,378	2	
Independent	Bijoy Bahudur Singh	263	0.38	
Majority				
Turnout		68,730	75.81	
Registered electors				
AGP gain from INC		Swing		

=== 2001 ===
2001 Assam Legislative Assembly election: Tezpur
Party	Candidate	Votes	%	±%
AGP	Brindaban Goswami	30,030	38.61	
INC	Robindra Kumar Goswami	29.036	37.33	
Independent	Bizit Salkia	16,509	21.23	
Independent	Jayanta Kumar Baruah	1,077	1.38	
SAP	Saheda Begum	381	0.49	
Independent	Purna Bora	377	0.48	
Independent	Biswanath Pratap Jadav	363	0.47	
Majority				
Turnout		77,773	71.17	
Registered electors				
AGP hold		Swing		

=== 2006 ===
2006 Assam Legislative Assembly election: Tezpur
Party	Candidate	Votes	%	±%
AGP	Brindaban Goswami	53,270		
INC	Bizit Saikia	44,850		
BJP	Anamika Baruah	2,721		
AGP(P)	Kartik Hazarika	2,424		
Independent	Mohammad Mia Hussein	1710		
Majority				
Turnout		1,04,979		
Registered electors				
AGP hold		Swing		

=== 2011 ===
2011 Assam Legislative Assembly election: Tezpur
Party	Candidate	Votes	%	±%
INC	Rajen Borthakur	43,738	41.27	
AGP	Brindaban Goswami	22,156	20.9	
AITC	Bizit Saikia	16,149	15.23	
AIUDF	Manik Gogoi	10,966	10.35	
BJP	Ritu Baran Sarma	9,464	8.96	
Independent	Santanu Mahanta	2,360	2.23	
Nationalist Congress Party	Mahendra Bhuyan	645	0.61	
Independent	Mia Hussein	522	0.49	
Majority		105,991	69.77	
Turnout				
Registered electors				
INC gain from AGP		Swing		

=== 2016 ===
2016 Assam Legislative Assembly election: Tezpur
Party	Candidate	Votes	%	±%
AGP	Brindaban Goswami	71,170	52.55	
INC	Hiranya Bhuyan	36,507	26.95	
AIUDF	Sukendra Nath	22,295	16.46	
Independent	Bizit Saikia	1,096	0.80	
SUCI(C)	Nayan Moni Choudhury	855	0.63	
Independent	Bhabananda Deka	742	0.54	
JMBP	Sujit Sarma	662	0.48	
NCP	Mahendra Bhuyan	569	0.42	
NOTA	None of the above	1,514	1.11	
Majority		34,663	25.60	
Turnout		1,35,413	82.38	
Registered electors		1,64,376		
AGP gain from INC		Swing		

=== 2021 ===
2021 Assam Legislative Assembly election: Tezpur
Party	Candidate	Votes	%	±%
AGP	Prithiraj Rava	71 454	47.69%	
INC	Dr.Anuj Kumar Mech	61,331	40.93	
AJP	JanmoniBorah	8,686	5.8%	New
Independent	Alok Nath	4,037	2.69	New
SUCI(C)	Nayan Moni Choudhury	916	0.61	
Independent	Sheikh Mohammad Sadique	769	0.51	New
Independent	Akash Jyoti Singha	590	0.39%	New
NOTA	None of the above	2,050	1.37%	
Majority		9 853		
Turnout		149,833		
Registered electors				
AGP hold		Swing		

=== 2026 ===
2026 Assam Legislative Assembly election: Tezpur
Party	Candidate	Votes	%	±%
AGP	Prithiraj Rava	79,140	53.39	+9.71
RD	Alok Nath	59,190	39.93	New
Independent	Pallabi Saikia	5,698	3.84	New
NOTA	NOTA	2,704	1.82	+0.45
Socialist Unity Centre Of India (Communist)	Nayan Moni Choudhury	1,485	1.00	+0.31
Margin of victory		19,950	13.47	
Turnout		148,217		
Rejected ballots				
Registered electors				
gain from		Swing		

== Parliamentary election results ==
2024 Indian General Election: Tezpur Assembly Constituency

Position in Tezpur Assembly Constituency	Highest Polling Candidate	Party	Votes
1.	Ranjit Dutta	Bharatiya Janata Party	78,268
	Premlal Gunju	Indian National Congress	48,116
	Rishiraj Kaundinya	Aam Aadmi Party	5,890
	Raju Deuri	Bodoland People's Front	784
	Alam Ali	Bahujan Maha Party	345
	Kameswar Swargiary	Voters Party International	366
	Rinku Roy	Gana Suraksha Party	518
	Pradip Bhandari	Independent	599

2019 Indian general election: Tezpur Assembly Constituency

Position in Tezpur Assembly Constituency	Highest Polling Candidate	Party	Votes	Percentage (%)
1.	Pallab Lochan Das	Bharatiya Janata Party	74,055	51.79%
2.	M.G.V.K. Bhanu	Indian National Congress	66,696	46.64%
3.	Mahendra Bhuyan	Nationalist Congress Party	678	0.47%
4.	Bijoy Kumar Tiru	Independent	522	0.37%
5.	Ziabur Rahman Khan	Independent	395	0.28%
Total Votes Polled				

2014 Indian general election: Tezpur Assembly Constituency

Position in Tezpur Assembly Constituency	Highest Polling Candidate	Party	Votes	Percentage (%)
1.	Ram Prasad Sharma	Bharatiya Janata Party	58,719	49.71%
2.	Bhupen Kumar Borah	Indian National Congress	45,606	38.61%
3.	Moni Kumar Subba	Independent	8,705	7.37%
4.	Joseph Toppo	Asom Gana Parishad	2,602	2.2%
5.	Khemraj Chetry	Communist Party of India (Marxist)	884	0.75%
Total Votes Polled				

2009 Indian general election: Tezpur Legislative Assembly Constituency

Position in Tezpur Assembly Constituency	Highest Polling Candidate	Party	Votes	Percentage (%)
1.	Joseph Toppo	Asom Gana Parishad	37,611	40.85%
2.	Moni Kumar Subba	Indian National Congress	34,278	37.23%
3.	Deba Orang	All India United Democratic Front	13,030	14.15%
4.	Jiten Sundi	Communist Party of India (Marxist)	2,178	2.37%
5.	Rudra Parajuli	Independent	1,121	1.22%
Total Votes Polled				

== See also ==
- Tezpur
- List of constituencies of Assam Legislative Assembly
