= Ritu Baran Sarmah =

Indian politician (born 1969)

Ritu Baran Sarmah (born 1969) is an Indian politician from Assam. He is a member of the Assam Legislative Assembly from the Barchalla Assembly constituency in Sonitpur district representing the Bharatiya Janata Party.

== Early life ==
Sarmah is from Tezpur, Sonitpur district, Assam. He is the son of Chandra Lal Sarmah. He completed his three year diploma in civil engineering at Assam Engineering Institute, Guwahati in 1991. He runs his own business. He declared assets worth Rs.4 crore in his affidavit to the Election Commission of India.

== Career ==
Sarmah won the Barchalla Assembly constituency representing the Bharatiya Janata Party in the 2026 Assam Legislative Assembly election. He polled 84,495 votes and defeated his nearest rival, Ripun Bora of the Indian National Congress, by a margin of 24.562 votes.
