= Prithiraj Rava =

Indian politician

Member of Assam Legislative Assembly
- Incumbent
- Assumed office 21 May 2021
- Preceded by: Brindaban Goswami
- Constituency: Tezpur

Personal details
- Born: 1959 (age 66–67)
- Party: Asom Gana Parishad
- Parent: Bishnu Prasad Rabha (father)
- Profession: Politician, Ex Civil Servant.

Prithiraj Rava (born 1959) is a politician and film actor from Assam. He was elected to the Assam Legislative Assembly from Tezpur (Vidhan Sabha constituency) in the 2021 Assam Legislative Assembly election as a member of the Asom Gana Parishad. He is the son of Bishnu Prasad Rabha, an artist of Assam. He starred in the Assamese films Srimanta Sankardeva (2010), Ahetuk, Lakhimi and Firingoti.
