= Taranga Gogoi =

Indian politician

Member of Assam Legislative Assembly
- Incumbent
- Assumed office 21 May 2021
- Preceded by: Naren Sonowal
- Constituency: Naharkatia (Vidhan Sabha constituency)

Personal details
- Born: 26.10.1984 Naharkatia
- Party: Bharatiya Janata Party
- Spouse: Bidisha Borgohain Gogoi
- Profession: Politician

Taranga Gogoi is an Indian politician from Assam. As an MLA for the Bharatiya Janata Party, he was elected to the Naharkatia constituency in the 2021 Assam Legislative Assembly election. He successfully retained his seat by winning re-election in the May 2026 Assam Assembly elections by 62,282 votes.

== Political Career ==
Following the new Assam CM Dr Himanta Biswa Sarma government in 2026, Taranga Gogoi was appointed as Political Secretary to the Chief Minister.

Addtionally, Taranga Gogoi is the incumbent President of the Assam Cricket Association (ACA), having been elected unanimously to the top sporting body.
