= Suchibrata Roy Choudhury =

Indian poet (1931–2009)

Suchibrata Roychoudhury
- শুচিব্রতা ৰায়চৌধুৰী
- Born: 1 September 1929; Guwahati, Assam, India
- Died: 2 December 2009 (aged 78); Guwahati, Assam, India
- Occupations: Government servant, writer, poet
- Years active: 1942–2003
- Parents: Ambikagiri Raichoudhury (father); Kaushalya Devi (mother)
- Awards: Sahitya Akademi Award

Suchibrata Roychoudhury (Assamese: শুচিব্রতা ৰায়চৌধুৰী; 1 September 1931 – 2 December 2009; sometimes spelled Suchibrata Raichoudhury) was an Assamese litterateur and poet, and the first female Judicial Magistrate of Assam as an Assam Civil Services officer. She received the Sahitya Akademi Translation Prize in 2001 for translating Suvira Jaiswal's The Origin and Development of Vaishnavism in India.

== Biography ==
Suchibrata was born on 1 September 1931 in Panbazar, Guwahati to freedom activist and poet Ambikagiri Roychoudhury and Kaushalya Devi Ambikagiri. Suchibrata was the eldest of four siblings.

From an early age, she was engaged in writing songs, stories, poems and articles. In class fifth, she published her first hand-written magazine Bonti along with her friend Kamala Das. She wrote a poem "Sannyasi" in the magazine on Mahatma Gandhi. She started singing borgeet when she was in class fourth.

She began school at the Balika Primary School in Panbazaar, Guwahati. From class fourth onwards, she continued her high school studies at Panbazar Girls' High School and completed her matriculation in 1945. She also received the Pratibha Devi Award and Narayani Handique Award for Science in the same year.

In the year 1947, she completed her intermediate examination from Handique Girls' College. She graduated from the same college in 1949 and enrolled in Gauhati University. She also wrote plays for All India Radio. She started her career as a teacher in the Tarini Charan Girls' School in 1951.

=== Social work ===
Suchibrata set up institutions throughout her life, leading her to earn Dinabandhavi title ("friend of the poor").

=== Civil service ===
By 1954, Suchibrata had joined the Assam Civil Service as a civil servant.

- 1953: Appeared the Assam Civil Service Examination (ACSE).
- 1954: Deputy Magistrate of the Gauhati Court on 15 February 1954, and then posted in different parts of Assam.
- 1970: Deputy Director of Panchayat Department, Shillong.
- 1973: Chief Executive Officer of Khadi and Gramodyog Board.
- 1976: Sub-Divisional Commissioner of Gauhati Division.
- 1977-83: Secretary of District Gazetteer. She was once again posted as the Chief Executive Officer of Khadi and Gramodyog Board in Guwahati.
- 1983: Deputy Director of Education Department, Assam Secretariat.
- 1986: Director of Social Welfare Department.
- 1989: Retired as an officer of Revenue Department on 31 August 1989.

== Bibliography ==
Suchibrata's literary works generally deal with themes of patriotism and social evils. Some of her literary works are:

=== Plays ===
- Kun Bate - Her first play was translated when she was in school. The play was later published by her father, narrated on radio and performed by Arya Natya Samaj and the Handique Girls College.
- Yugar Dabi
- Garima
- Troyee

=== Translations ===
Suchibrata translated many books and plays into Assamese.

- Mahmud of Ghazni, a historical biography, from English to Assamese under the Indian Council of Historical Research
- The Moon is Down by John Steinback into Assamese with the title Beli Lohiale
- The Moon and Sixpence, a collection of short stories by Somerset Maugham
- The Serpent and the Rope by Raja Rao (2005), as Jivanatit, published by Sahitya Akademi
- The Cherry Orchard by Anton Chekov (2005), published by Lawyer's Book Stall
- Dangerous Corner by J.B Priestly into Assamese as Bipad Seema (1994)
- A collection of Short Stories by O. Henry (1999)
- The Origin and Development of Vaishnavism in India by Suvira Jaiswal (1999)

=== Short stories ===
- Saptaparna (1960)
- Sonali Pera (1956)
- Budhiyok Kun (1991-98)

=== Novels ===
- Sundar Desh (1960)
- Bah Maroli (1953-54)
- Kamonar Jui Jolil Jetiya (1954)

=== Collections of poems and songs ===
- Mathu Katha (1988)
- Tumi Aru Moi (1950)
- Hahakarar Gaan (1995)
- Suhuri (1996)
- Gunjan (1996)
- Spandan

=== Other works ===
- Jeeban Premor Atandra Anal (2000)
- Agneepath (2010) a biography of her father, Ambikagiri Roychoudhury
- Aain Aru Adalat (2006)
- Sahitya Manjari
- Chetanar Chinta (1999), a compilation of editorials of the magazine Chetana published by the Asam Sahitya Sabha.
