= Suvira Jaiswal =

Indian historian

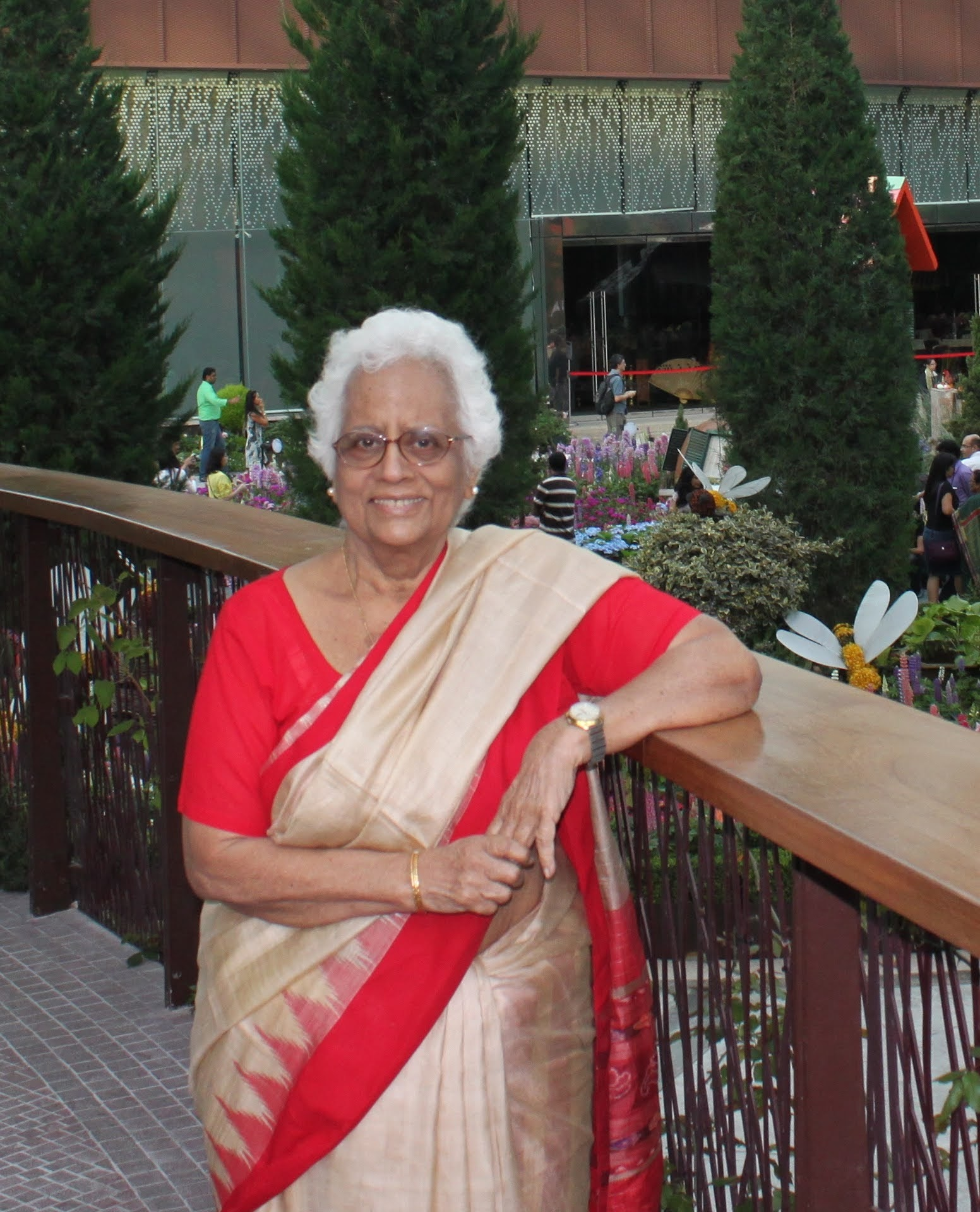
- Jaiswal in 2016
- Born: India
- Scientific career
- Fields: Social history of ancient India
- Workplaces: Jawaharlal Nehru University
- Doctoral advisor: Ram Sharan Sharma

Suvira Jaiswal is an Indian historian. She is known for her research into the social history of ancient India, especially the evolution of the caste system and the development and absorption of regional deities into the Hindu pantheon.

== Biography ==
Suvira Jaiswal obtained a master's degree in history from Allahabad University. She received her doctorate under at the guidance of Ram Sharan Sharma at Patna University.

Jaiswal taught at Patna University from 1962. She was a professor at the Centre for Historical Studies at Jawaharlal Nehru University from 1971 until her retirement in 1999.

In 2007, Jaiswal was the General President of the Indian History Congress.

== Research ==
Jaiswal has researched the evolution of the caste system in India, its origins and functions. She showed that in the period of the Rig Veda, the caste system hadn't yet become the complex hierarchy of later periods. She showed that the grihapati, previously thought to be a head of a family, was in fact the leader of an extended kin-group, and that the transition from a pastoral to a sedentary mode of production led to increased social stratification with the grihapati becoming an archetype of the patriarchal principle. Jaiswal showed that neither skin colour and notions of race were the basis of caste (varna) differentiation. Rather, it was the unequal access to economic and political power that entrenched status distinctions and crystallised the hierarchy.

She also determined that there were consequences to specialist economic roles, endogamy and hierarchical society: the systematic suppression of women as a class. In particular, she pointed out that there was insufficient surplus production of goods in the Rig Vedic period to allow any section of society to withdraw from economic activity. This meant that women were more or less autonomous in their agency, having access to education and free movement.

== Selected works ==
=== Articles ===
- Jaiswal, Suvira (1974). "Studies in the Social Structure of the Early Tamils". In Sharma, R.S. (ed.). Indian Society: Historical Probings (In Memory of D.D. Kosambi). New Delhi: ICHR.
- Jaiswal, Suvira (1975). "Women in Early India: Problems and Perspectives". In Horner, I.B. (ed.). Women under Primitive Buddhism. New Delhi: Motilal Banarsidas.
- Jaiswal, Suvira (1979–80). "Studies in Early Indian Social History: Trends and Possibilities". The Indian Historical Review. 6 (1–2).
- Jaiswal, Suvira (1991). "Varna Ideology and Social Change". Social Scientist. 19 (3/3). doi:10.2307/3517555. JSTOR 3517555.
- Jaiswal, Suvira (1993). "Historical Evolution of the Ram Legend". Social Scientist. 21 (3/4). doi:10.2307/3517633. JSTOR 3517633.
- Jaiswal, Suvira (January 2000). "Sculpture at Vijayanagara: Iconography and Style". Indian Historical Review. 27 (1): 106–107. doi:10.1177/037698360002700112. S2CID 141405230.
- 'Caste in the Socio-Economic Framework of Early India', Presidential Address, Section 1, in Proceedings of the Indian History Congress, 38th Session, Bhubaneswar, 1977, pp. 23–48.
- 'Semitising Hinduism: Changing Paradigms of Brahmanical Integration', Social Scientist, vol. 19, no. 12, 1991, pp. 20–32.
- 'The Changing Concept of Gahapati', in D. N. Jha, ed., Society and Ideology in India: Essays in Honour of Professor R. S. Sharma, Delhi: Munshiram Manoharlal, 1996: 29–37.
- 'Tribe-Caste interaction: A Re-examination of certain Issues', in Dev Nathan, ed., From Tribe to Caste, Shimla: IIAS, 1997: 167–75.

=== Books ===
- Jaiswal, Suvira (1981). The Origin and Development of Vaisnavism from 200 BC to AD 500. Munshiram Manoharlal.
- Jaiswal, Suvira (2000). Caste: Origin, Function, and Dimensions of Change. Manohar. ISBN 978-81-7304-334-5.
- Jaiswal, Suvira (2016). The Making of Brahmanic Hegemony: Studies in Caste, Gender, and Vaiṣṇava Theology. Tulika Books. ISBN 978-93-82381-83-9.
- Jaiswal, Suvira (2019). Emergence of Castes and Outcastes: Historical Roots of the 'Dalit' Problem. Kolkata: The Asiatic Society. ISBN 978-81-941437-5-8.
