= Rajen Borthakur =

Indian politician (1964–2019)

Member of Assam Legislative Assembly
- In office 2011–2015
- Preceded by: Brindaban Goswami
- Succeeded by: Brindaban Goswami
- Constituency: Tezpur (Vidhan Sabha constituency)

Personal details
- Born: 5 November 1964 Tezpur
- Died: 10 December 2019 (aged 55) Times Hospital, Tezpur
- Party: Indian National Congress
- Education: Darrang College
- Profession: Politician

Rajen Borthakur (5 November 1964 – 10 December 2019) was an Indian politician. He was elected to the Assam Legislative Assembly in 2011 from Tezpur Assembly constituency on an Indian National Congress ticket. He was elected from Rangapara Assembly constituency in the 2019 by election as a member of the Bharatiya Janata Party. The by-election was held due to Pallab Lochan Das being elected to Parliament. Formerly, Borthakur was with Indian National Congress.

He died following a cardiac arrest on 10 December 2019. He was 54.
