= Jiban Bora =

Member of Assam Legislative Assembly
- In office 1978–1983
- Preceded by: Dr. Rabindra Kumar Goswami
- Succeeded by: Nabin Chandra Kath Hazarika
- Constituency: Tezpur (Vidhan Sabha constituency)

Personal details
- Born: 1928 (age 97–98) Barhampur, Jamugurihat, Darrang District
- Party: Janata Party Janta Dal Praja Socialist Party
- Education: Cotton University, Gauhati University
- Profession: Politician, Professor, Educationist, Advocate

Jiban Bora was an Indian politician who served as Member of Assam Legislative Assembly from Tezpur Assembly constituency.

== Electoral performance ==
Year	Party	Constituency Name	Result	Votes
1967 Assam Legislative Assembly election	Praja Socialist Party	Missamari Assembly Constituency	Lost	Runner-up
1967 Assam Legislative Assembly election	Praja Socialist Party	Missamari Assembly Constituency	Lost	7,277
1978 Assam Legislative Assembly election	Janata Party	Tezpur Assembly constituency	Won	17,663
1991 Assam Legislative Assembly election	Janata Dal	Tezpur Assembly constituency	Lost	5th Runner-up
1991 Assam Legislative Assembly election	Janata Dal	Tezpur Assembly constituency	Lost	2,395

== See also ==
1978 Assam Legislative Assembly election
