= Barchalla Assembly constituency =

Constituency of the Assam legislative assembly in India

Barchalla
- Constituency No. 66 for the Assam Legislative Assembly

Constituency details
- Country: India
- Region: Northeast India
- State: Assam
- District: Sonitpur
- Lok Sabha constituency: Sonitpur
- Established: 1957
- Reservation: None

Barchalla is one of the 126 assembly constituencies of Assam Legislative Assembly. Barchalla forms part of the Sonitpur Lok Sabha constituency.

Most Successful parties from Barchalla Vidhan Sabha
1. Indian National Congress (4 Times) 55 (48.7%)
2. Bharatiya Janata Party (2 Times) 22 (19.5%)
3. Asom Gana Parishad (1 Time) 12 (10.6%)
4. Plain Tribals Council of Assam) (1 Time) 12 (10.6%)
5. Prafulla Goswami(Ind) (1 Time) 12 (10.6%)
6. 0 (0.00%)
7. 0 (0.00%)
8. 0 (0.00%)

== Members of the Legislative Assembly ==
Dhekiajuli South, Barchalla & Missamari Assembly Constituencies (1952-1978)

Year	Winner	Party
Dhekiajuli South Constituency(1952-1957)
1952	Mohi Kanta Das	Indian National Congress
Barchalla Assembly Constituency(1957-1967)
1957	Mohi Kanta Das	Indian National Congress
1962	Mohi Kanta Das	Indian National Congress
Missamari Assembly Constituency(1967-1978)
1967	Mohi Kanta Das	Indian National Congress
1972	Bijoy Chandra Sarmah	Indian National Congress

Barchalla Assembly Constituency (1978–present)

Year	Winner	Party	
1978	Kamal Chandra Basumatary	Plain Tribals Council of Assam	
1985	Prafulla Goswami	Independent	
1991	Rudra Parajuli	Indian National Congress	
1996	Prafulla Goswami	Asom Gana Parishad	
2001	Tanka Bahadur Rai	Indian National Congress	
2006	Tanka Bahadur Rai	Indian National Congress	
2011	Tanka Bahadur Rai	Indian National Congress	
2016	Ganesh Kumar Limbu	Bharatiya Janata Party	23,682
2021	Ganesh Kumar Limbu	Bharatiya Janata Party	17,782
2026	Ritu Baran Sarmah	Bharatiya Janata Party	

== Election results ==
=== 2026 ===
2026 Assam Legislative Assembly election: Barchalla
Party	Candidate	Votes	%	±%
BJP	Ritu Baran Sarmah	84495	53.15	
INC	Ripun Bora	59933	37.7	
UPPL	BABURAM BASUMATARY	1714	1.08	
NOTA	NOTA	1845	1.16	
Margin of victory		24562		
Turnout		158972		
Rejected ballots				
Registered electors				
BJP hold		Swing		

=== 2021 ===
2021 Assam Legislative Assembly election: Batadroba
Party	Candidate	Votes	%	±%
BJP	Ganesh Kumar Limbu			
NOTA	None of the above			
Majority				
Turnout				
Registered electors				
BJP hold		Swing		

== See also ==
- List of constituencies of Assam Legislative Assembly
