= Naharkatiya =

Town in Dibrugarh district, Assam

Naharkatia
- city
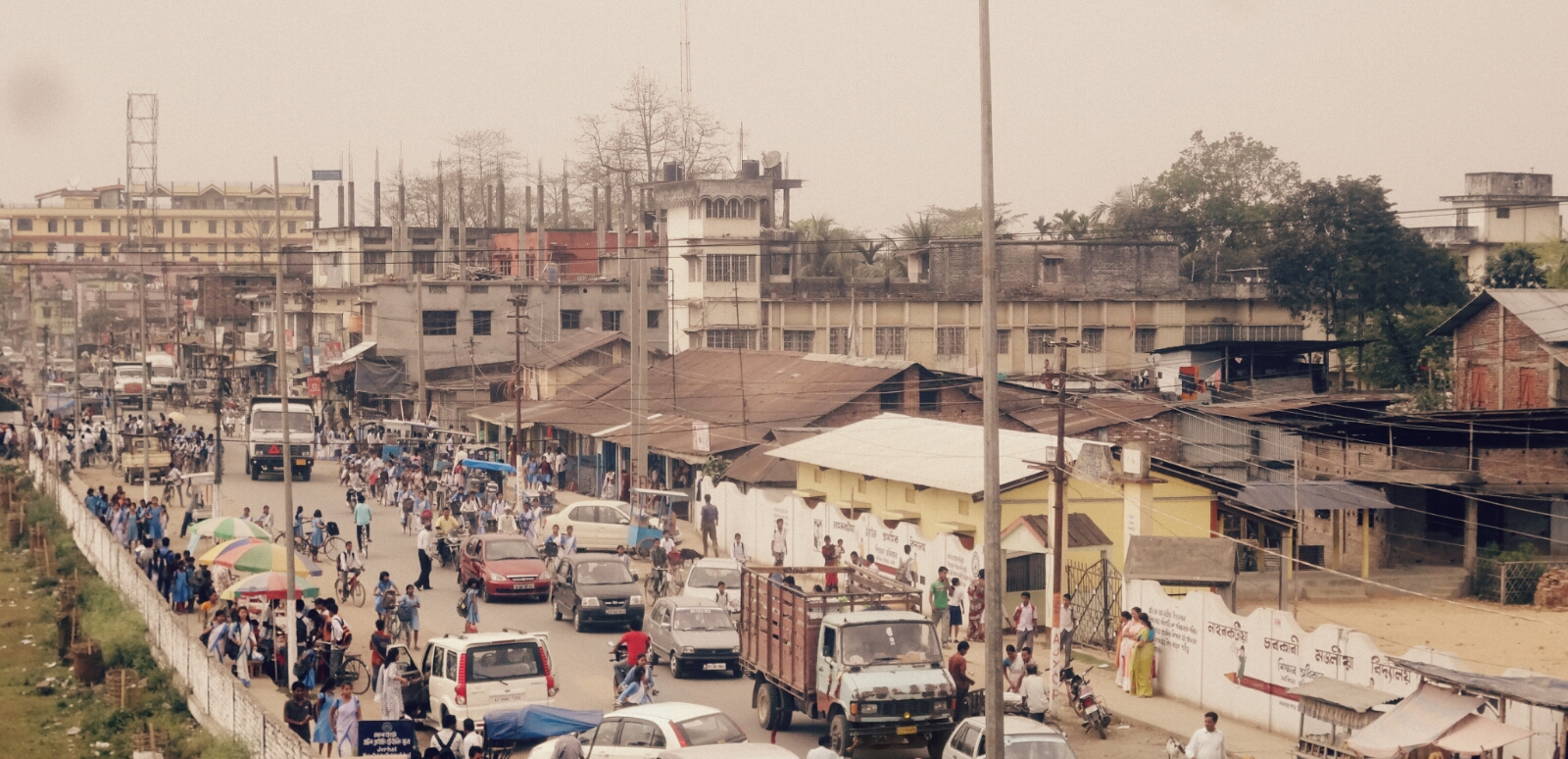
- Aerial view of Naharkatia near Tuesday Market

- Location in Assam, India.
- Coordinates: 27.28°N 95.33°E
- Country: India
- State: Assam
- District: Dibrugarh

Government
  - Body: Naharkatia Municipal Board
- Elevation: 121 m (397 ft)

Population (2011)
  - Total: 18,937

Languages
  - Official: Assamese
- Time zone: UTC+5:30 (IST)
- PIN: 786610
- Telephone code: (+91)374
- Vehicle registration: AS-06

Naharkatia (previously spelt as Naharkatiya or Nahorkatiya) is a town and a Municipal board in Dibrugarh district in the Indian state of Assam. It is well known for petroleum and gas reserves. Earlier, Duliajan, the head office town of Oil India Limited was in its circle. However, the towns are close, within a 30-minute journey.

== Demographics ==
According to the 2011 India census, Naharkatia had a population of 18,937 of which 9,790 are males while 9,147 are females. Naharkatia has a literacy rate of 87.29%, higher than the state average of 72.19%; male literacy is 91.23%, and female literacy is 83.08%. In Naharkatia, 9.76% of the population is under 6 years of age.

The town is an amalgamation of many communities, mainly Assamese, Bengali, Indian Gorkha, Bihari and many Marwari people reside in the town area. A few Punjabi families have also lived in the town for many years. There are also a few Bodo, Manipuri families who reside outside the town.

About six kilometers from the town, a village named, 'Namphake' is situated which is the largest village inhabited by the Tai-Phake people in Assam. This village houses a Buddhist monastery and handicrafts woven by them are very beautiful. The monastery is a tourist attraction and is considered to be meditation center in a serene atmosphere. The town is more attractive due to the three tea estates.

== Culture ==
Bihu is the major indigenous festival of Assam. During Bohag Rangali Bihu season, a Bihu dance competition is held in Langharjan stadium. It is a week-long celebration for all the indigenous Assamese communities in the region.

Durga Puja is another local festival observed. The idol of the goddess Durga is worshiped and the town is decorated with lights and pandals. On the last day a procession is organized, known as Bhasan. In the past, prizes were given to the best Durga Puja Pandal Committee.

Sangken or the Water Festival is a festival celebrated in the month of April by the Tai Phake people and it continues to be a special attraction for tourists visiting Namphake village during this period.

Mangalbaria (Tuesday) Bazaar is the local market.

A sports stadium known as Langharjan Field is situated at the outskirts of the town.

=== Language ===
Languages spoken in Naharkatiya (2011)
1. Assamese (43.9%)
2. Bengali (27.1%)
3. Hindi (16.5%)
4. Odia (3.73%)
5. Nepali (1.42%)
6. others (7.29%)

Assamese is the most spoken language at 8,307 speakers, followed by Bangla at 5,141, Hindi is spoken by 3,133 people, Odia at 707 and Nepali at 270.

== Economy ==
The town is a commercial hub for nearby tea gardens and villages.

A few kilometres away, a rainforest is found along Joypur and cross it to get into Arunachal Pradesh.

== Education ==
- Naharkatiya College (1964): Offers higher secondary and bachelor's degrees in Arts and Commerce and has a study center of Krishna Kanta Handiqui State Open University (KKHSOU).
- Naharkatia Higher Secondary School (Class VI - XII) (1939): Assamese Medium school with Arts, Science and Vocational studies in Higher Secondary Section.
- St. Mary's School, Naharkatia (1958) (English medium): The school initially had class L.K.G - Class X. Since 2008 the school has extended its education to higher secondary section and offers education in the Arts.
- Shankardev Sishu Niketan, Naharkatia (1998): An Assamese medium school. (Class Primary-X)
- Naharkatia Model High School
- Naharkatia Vidya Mandir School: A Bengali medium school (Class I-X).
- R.K. Jitani Hindi Vidyalaya: A Hindi medium school (Class i-X).
- St. Xavier School, NAharkatia
- Weingken English School

● Naharkatia New High School

Other educational institutions are Town MV School and Naharkatia Junior College.

A brief description of Naharkatia H.S. School Naharkatia Higher Secondary School has got its entity and by crossing long Seventy five years, reached the present stage on the basis of some eye-witnesses and renowned persons. As they said-there was a stream at the back where the present Naharkatia Govt M.V. School is situated. On the bank opposite of the stream, Naharkatia H.S. School was as situated including M.V. and M.E. sections. At that time, the railway line was in front of the school and being the stream there, it was very difficult for entrance. So people thought a safety and advantageous place for the school. Then an inhabitant of kachari village late Devadhar Borah donated a piece of land in the name of the school where the present M.V. School is situated. When the school was established there, there arose a dispute between the two teachers of the school and decided to retain any one section there. Same way, there arose a dispute between the two groups of general people on the same matter and settled to retain the M.V. School there. Lt. Sadananda Kakati became the permanent Head teacher of the school after a period of restless condition of the Head teacher. At that time Lt. Benudhar Baruah and some of his supporters planned to establish an M.E. School and on this purpose, bought the land of a huge area from Gobra Gowala and Mangal Singh Gorh where Naharkatia H.S. School is situated at present and established the M.E. School there. Lt. Benudhar Baruah had run the school as a Head Teacher with great difficulties and hardship. After a few years, the inhabitants of Naharkatia town decided to start high section and accordingly, the High Section is started. The then only graduate of Sola Kotoki Village Lt. Mohersar Gogoi was requested to ornament the throne of the Head Master. But unfortunately there again arose a dispute of starting High Section among the public. At last, the situation deteriorated and the authority locked and sealed the school. Then another group of supporters built a temporary house of tokopat outside of the locked school boundary and started to run both the sections primary and high there. Then an inhabitant of the Dighalibil area Lt. Bapuram Borah acted as the main secretary of the school. Besides him, the other memorable liberal persons who came forward to help and develop the school were – Lt. Devadhar Borah, Lt. Narad Hazarika, Dhananjoy Gaon Burah, Dhaneswar Gaon Burah, Md. Elahi Box Das and many of the well-wishers of the school. They should be always recalled by the successors for their heartiest hard work, integrated attempt and sacrifice for the school.

With the utmost attempt of the above mentioned self devoted persons, the school began to run somewhat smoothly. Seeing this, the authority of the previous locked and sealed school, with great support of the public, reopened the school. But yet the school did not come to its permanent management. Then in 1939, the former principal of the present NHK HS School Lt. Phatick Chandra Gogoi was invited to take the charge of the school. But seeing the internal disorder of the school, he refused to continue and discharge his duty and left the school for home. But again in 1945, people requested him to take the charge of the school. Then Lt. Moheswar Gogoi handed over the charge of the school to Lt. Phatik Chandra Gogoi and went to Dibrugarh and joined in the same post at Graham Bazaar High School. At that time, if he had not laboures and devoted time for the formation of the school, it might had been backed to many years. So not only the residents of Naharkatia town but also all the people of vast Naharkatia area are indebted to him. Coming back for the second time, Lt. Phatik Gogoi Sir devoted himself heart and soul and able to form a confident and public opinion amongst the people and as a result, the school began to develop day by day. For his utmost attempt and careful nourishment the school able to acquire goodwill in all spheres—education, games and sports etc. Then in 1956 the school received a donation. In 1962, the school is upgraded from H.E to H.S. Section and at a due time, it provincialised.

Lt. Benudhar Baruah, contributed to a great extent, as an Assistant Headmaster and a Vice-Principal, for the construction of the school from the beginning. He died on 6 August 1964 while serving as the school's vice-principal. The some of other persons who assisted Baruah Sir were the Ex- MLA Lt. Bhadra Kanta Gogoi, Lt. Gauri Boruh and Lt. Sasadhar Boruah. Lt.B.K. Gogoi Sir, being the president of the school Managing committee for many times, managed and conducted the school. In this way the school got its entity and reached up to the present stage.

Enclosure:

Man with a great enthusiasm- Benudhar Baruah played an active part in formation of Naharkatia M.V. School along with Naharkatia M.E. School. At that time, Moheswar Gogoi of Salakotoki Village was his assistant. At a time, the M.E. School was separated from the M.V. School and formed as an independent school.

Then the public of this area decided to start High Section belonging class vii attached with the M.E. School. But unfortunately there arose a dispute among some of the public. A section supported for the High School but another section opposed it. But the then fresh graduate Lt. Phatik Chandra Gogoi was invited and requested to take the charge of the High Section. He took the charge of the school with the blessing of the well-wishrs and on 27th March, 1939, High English School was inaugurated. So Lt. Phatik Chandra Gogoi is the founder head teacher of the High English School. Moheswar Gogoi was the Headmaster of the M.E. School. At all, Banudhar Baruah and Phatik Chandra Gogoi were the introducers of English Education in this region and they will be always remembered.

There were eleven (11) students in the first batch of Naharkatia High English School. They were—— Nagen (Sonowal) Dhekial, Dindiram Saikia, Ghateswar sonowal, Muluka Dhadumia, Sailyadhar Holal. Hariprasanna Roy, Bhadrakanta Gogoi(Tipam), Sudhansu Sekhar Dey, Jatin Ghosh, ChaiNai Khyam Gohain, and Manik Sonowal. Gogoi Sir started the school with these students. The first school Managing committee was like this—–

President—Abdul Jelil Karani Baruah, Vice President—Narayan Hazarika, Secretary—Bhadrakanta Gogoi, Members—i) Maqbul Bhuyan, ii) Bhuban Chaudhury, iii)Khageswar Borah iv) Sailen Dhar, v)Kanailal Jitani. In a due time, the construction work of the school was begun though there was an anti-opinion among the people about it and it was going on developing with the support of some people loving the mother tongue-Assamese. but Lt. Phatik Chandra. Gogoi Sir left school in 1942 for the injury he got in his leg. Before it both the M.E. and High School amalgamated. Moheswar gogoi took the charge as the Headmaster for the period from 1942 to 1945. Phatik Sir returned to the school in 1945. The then Inspector of schools of upper Assam Diwakar Goswami came to visit the school and made a thorough enquiry of the school. Seeing the inactiveness of the school Managing committee during the period 1942 to 1945, the inspector Sir formed a school Managing committee consisting of Nabin Phukan, Jugananda Baruah, Ilahi Box, Bapuram Borah, Gauri Baruah and the local S.D.C. The S.D.C was nominated as the president and Bapuram Borah as the secretary of the committee. Along with, Phatic Chandra Gogoi Sir was handed over the charge of Headmaster. Consequently,Lt. Moheswar Gogoi Sir left the school and joined the Graham Bazaar High School at Dibrugarh.

Then the different affaires of the school developed to a great extent and it was affiliated in 1949-The first batch of the H.S.L.C Examination appeared in 1949-50and a candidate named Diwakar Neog passed out of four.

There were some distinguished and illustrious persons behind the development of the school. One of them a freedom fighter Sir Bhadrakanta Gogoi had been serving the school heartily in its troublesome period from the beginning. He was the President of the School Managing Committee for a long period. With his utmost support and active role, a huge amount of money used to come to the school development fund from the total collection of the Naharkatia Daily Bazaar and Naharkatia weekly market held on every Tuesday. It had been started in 1950 and continued to the sixtieth decade. In the first year this amount of money was Rs. 800.oo (Eight hundred). With this money, the pucca building of the school was constructed and furniture’s and other necessities were provided. The present principal’s room, office room, Girls common room, Teacher’s common room and class rooms from room No.8 to 13 were constructed for the first time. One of the masons of this first building construction was Jaggu-The other active members of the School Managing Committee were Bapuram Borah, Godadhar, Barthakur, Gauri Baruah and Nabin Phukan. All of them were life-time members of the committee. The earlier time to time assistant teachers were Upen Sharma, Priya Bhuyah, Nagen Chaudhury, Achyut Choudhury, Brikodar Deka,Saifuddin Ahmed, Herald Bazra, Jugeswar Swargari, Mohendra Sharma, Prabhat Misra, Jugeswar Sonowal, Ai mya khang Gohain, Susil Bhattacharjee, Madan Sharma.

Lt. Phatik Chandra Gogoi along with the then assistant head teacher Benudhar Baruah served heartily for the management and development of the school. At present, the school consisting of Arts, Science and vocational stream is a perfect school. Now there are many class rooms, a library, an auditorium (not completed yet), a practical room for chemistry, a practical room for physics, a practical room for Biology, a practical room for vocational stream, a computer class room, a room for gym and a big field in front of the school. In sports, the school has got a well recognition in the state. The lady volleyball team consisting of students of this school was the first lady volleyball team of Assam. Same way, the girls of this school introduced lady football for the first time in Assam. At present, Assam’s pre-Olympic footballer Sri Tochen Borah was a student of this school. The school could perform in other games also at a standard level.

An ex-student Sri Abani Kumar Sharma (now in America in a high official rank) passed the H.S.L.C Examination in 1956 and obtained tenth position and another ex-student Silpi Das (a doctor by profession at Naharkatia) passed the H.S .Examination in 1970 and obtained third position. Sri Subhas Naha Biswas (a doctor in England) who donated a class room now used by the Vocational Stream was also an ex-student of this school. In the H.S.L.C Examination, Sri Bhaba Prasad Chaliha obtained highest marks in Sanskrit in 1953 and Sri Taranga Rajkhowa obtained highest marks in Science in 1961. And Sri Porag Phukan obtained highest marks in Assamese in 1972 in H.S.examination. There are many ex-students who are abled to establish themselves in many high obtained highest ranks not only in Assam but also all over the country. Even some of the ex-students abled to establish themselves in other countries also.

== Geography ==
Burhi Dihing, a tributary of Brahmaputra, flows through the town.

Sasoni Gojpuria, Gabhoru Dolong, Merbill Echo-Tourism, and Namphake are villages a few kilometres away.

== History ==
The name Naharkatia is connected with the history of killing or punishment of Prince Nahar, an adopted son of the Tai-Ahom king Sukhampha, also known as Khora Raja, punished by Kalia Chaodang. According to local saying, 'one Ahom Noble Kalia Chaodang' was entrusted to punish Prince Nahar at Bardoiyamukh for his misdeeds against the important Tai-Ahom nobles including the Ministers. This Kalia alias Kola Chaodang was finally settled near today's Naharkatia Railway Station and from this episode, the area became Nahakatia. Nahar+katiya, i.e., the person who cut or beheaded Nahar at the instance of Tai-Ahom king Siukhampha settled there. Naharkatiya was frequented by many Indian royals, including Austric King Sung-Saumara, Kachari kings Bicharpatipha, Mahamanukyapha, Tai-Ahom kings Chaolung Siukapha, Siukhampha alias Khora Raja during the attack of Koch General Chilarai on the capital Gargaon in 1562. Jaydhvajsimha visited while in exile during the Mughal invasion by Nabab Mirjumla, 1662.

Burmese General Mingimaha Tilwa traveled this route to Mung-dun-chun-kham in the early part of the 19th century.

Ahom General Patalsing Barbarua founded Jaypur garh against the advancing Burmese through this route, finally sacrificing his life at the hands of the Burmese at Jeypore.

Sriram Ata founded his Vaisnavi Satra there. Nocte Chief Narottama accepted the Vaisnav faith there.

Near Naharkatiya, historical Tipam, Jaypur and Namrup (derived from Namruk) rests. The oldest oil pool is located there. It is famous for tea gardens. It produced athletes and sports organisers.

== Organizations ==
- Asam Sahitya Sabha
- AASU
- ATASU
- AJYCP
- All Assam Gorkha Student Union
- AATSA
- NYS (Naharkatia Yuva Samaj)
- Project Naharkatia
- All Adivasi Student Association of Assam(AASAA).

== Politics ==
Naharkatia is the 120th Assembly constituency of Assam, which is a part of Dibrugarh (Lok Sabha constituency).

=== Members of Legislative Assembly ===
- 1978: Sasha Kamal Handique, Communist Party of India (Marxist).
- 1985: Kusumbar Tairai, Independent.
- 1991: Sasha Kamal Handique, Communist Party of India (Marxist).
- 1996: Pranati Phukan, Indian National Congress.
- 2000: Pranati Phukan, Indian National Congress.
- 2001: Pranati Phukan, Indian National Congress.
- 2006: Pranati Phukan, Indian National Congress.
- 2011: Pranati Phukan, Indian National Congress.
- 2016: Naren Sonowal, Asom Gana Parishad.
- 2020: Taranga Gogoi, Bharatiya Janata Party.

== Sports ==
Naharkatia is very active town when talked about sports. It has given birth to several sports-person representing the state and the nation. The natives are very good with football, cricket, hockey, handball and chess. The youths are more drawn towards cricket and tae-kwon-do (Korean martial arts).

== Transport ==
The Naharkatia Railway station serves as the railhead. Buses run frequently to and from Duliajan, Namrup, Tinsukia, Dibrugarh, Moran, Guwahati, Jorhat and Sibsagar.

== See also ==
- Naharkatiya College
