= Naren Sonowal =

Indian politician

Naren Sonowal (born 10 February 1960 in Dighola Pather, Naharkatia) is an Asom Gana Parishad politician from Assam. He was elected to the Assam Legislative Assembly in the 2016 election from Naharkatia.
