= Purabi Bormudoi =

Indian writer (1950–2019)

- Born: 8 May 1950; Deurigaon, Tezpur, Assam, India
- Died: 15 July 2019 (aged 69); Gauhati Medical College and Hospital, Assam
- Occupation: Author
- Writing career
- Genre: Assamese literature
- Notable works: Shantanukulanandan, Baghshal, Baghjal Aru Manuh, Rupowali Noir Sonowali Ghat, Eta Alibatar Itikatha

Purabi Bormudoi (8 May 1950 – 15 July 2019) was an Indian writer in the Assamese language, known for her social and periodical novels and short stories. She was awarded the Sahitya Akademi Award in the Assamese language in 2007 for her novel Shantanukulanandan, a saga of the mighty Brahmaputra River

== Early life and education ==
Puarabi Bormudoi was born on May 8, 1950, at Deurigaon, a remote village near Tezpur town of Sonitpur District of Assam, She passed matriculation in 1967 from Tezpur Higher Secondary and Multipurpose Girls’ School. Bormudoi went to Gauhati University after completing graduation in History honours from Darrang College in 1970. In 1973 she completed her master's degree in history from Gauhati University and decided to become a full-time author. Her first novel Gajaraj, Prem Aru Banditva was serialized in Gariyoshi, a literary magazine of Assam in 1998. In 1975 she was married to Dr. Ananda Bormudoi, a literary critic, writer and translator of Assam.

== Death ==
After a severe accident in 2006, Purabi Bormudoi spent her life in a wheelchair until her death. On July 15, 2019, following a prolonged illness, she died at Gauhati Medical College and Hospital, Assam.

== Novels ==
- গজৰাজ, প্ৰেম আৰু বন্দীত্ব "Gajaraj, Prem Aru Banditva", 1999
- বাঘজাল, বাঘশাল আৰু মানুহ "Baghshal, Baghjal Aru Manuh", 2000
- ৰূপোৱালী নৈৰ সোণোৱালী ঘাট "Rupowali Noir Sonowali Ghat", 2001
- শান্তনুকুলনন্দন "Shantanukulanandan", 2005
- এটা আলিবাটৰ ইতিকথা "Eta Alibatar Itikatha", 2008

== Novellas ==
- পৰম পূজনীয় আৰু দুখন উপন্যাসিকা "Param Pujaniya Aru Dukhan Upanyasika", 2004
- নি্বাচিত উপন্যাসিকা "Nirbachit Upanyasika", 2005

== Short stories ==
- শীতৰ কুঁৱলী "Sheetar Kuwnali", 1977
- পূৰৱী বৰমুদৈৰ নিৰ্বাচিত গল্প (প্ৰথম খণ্ড) "Purabi Bormudoir Nirbachit Galpa", Vol. I, 2002
- পূৰৱী বৰমুদৈৰ নিৰ্বাচিত গল্প (দ্বিতীয় খণ্ড) "Purabi Bormudoir Nirbachit Galpa", Vol. II, 2005
- হেৰোৱাজনক বিচাৰি আৰু অন্যান্য গল্প "Heruajanak Bichari Aru Anyanya Galpa", 2014
- পূৰৱী বৰমুদৈৰ নিৰ্বাচিত গল্প (তৃতীয় খণ্ড) "Purabi Bormudoir Nirbachit Galpa", Vol. III, 2015
- অৱশেষত বৰষুণ 'Abasheshat Barashun', 2017
- সপোনৰ ঘৰ ঘৰৰ সপোন 'Saponar Ghar Gharar Sapon', 2018
- ৰ'দৰ ৰং 'Rodar Rang', 2019

== Awards ==
- In 2000 received Basanti Bordoloi Literary Award for Gajaraj, Prem Aru Banditva.
- In 2005 received first Lekhika Samaroh Bota for lifetime achievement.
- In 2007 received Sahitya Akademi Award for Shantanukulanandan.
- In 2007 received Prabina Saikia Award for Lifetime achievement.
- In 2007 received Saganlal Jain Award for the novel Rupowali Noir Sonowali Ghat.
- In 2011 received Assam Valley Literary Award for Lifetime achievement
