= Bishnu Prasad Rabha =

Indian cultural figure from Assam, musician and songwriter, activist

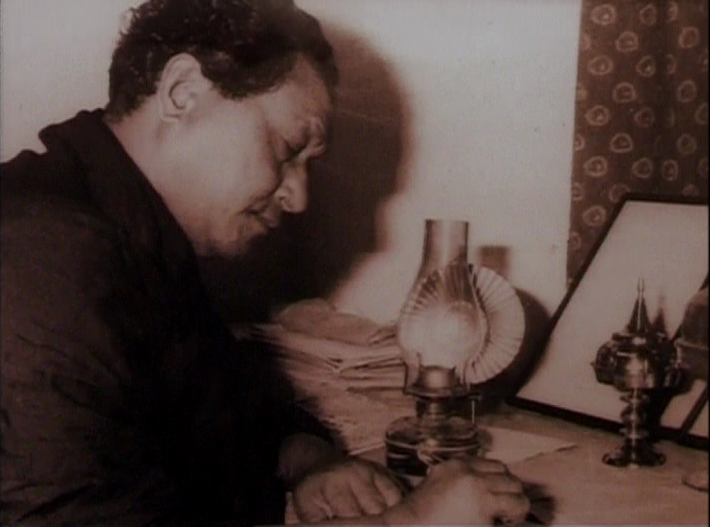
- Bishnu Prasad Rabha in the 1950s
- Pronunciation: [bisnu pɹɔxad ɹabʱa]
- Born: 31 January 1909; Dacca, Bengal Presidency, British India
- Died: 20 June 1969 (aged 60); Tezpur, Darrang, Assam, India
- Other names: Kalaguru, Sainik Silpi
- Education: Calcutta University (BSc)
- Occupations: Artist; actor; painter; dancer; politician; music composer; poet; dramatist; writer
- Years active: 1909–1969
- Political party: Revolutionary Communist Party of India
- Children: Prithiraj Rava

Bishnu Prasad Rabha (Note: Assamese pronunciation: [bisnu pɹɔxad ɹabʱa].) (Assamese pronunciation: [bisnu pɹɔxad ɹabʱa]; 31 January 1909 – 20 June 1969) was an Indian cultural figure from Assam, known for his contributions to music, dance, painting, literature, and political activism. As an advocate of the people's cultural movement, he drew heavily from various genres of classical and folk cultural traditions. Considered a doyen of the culture of Assam, the people of Assam affectionately call him Kalaguru (meaning "master of the arts"). He is also called by Marxists Sainik Silpi (sainik "soldier", silpi "artist") for his active participation in the armed struggle led by the Revolutionary Communist Party of India (RCPI).

== Life and background ==
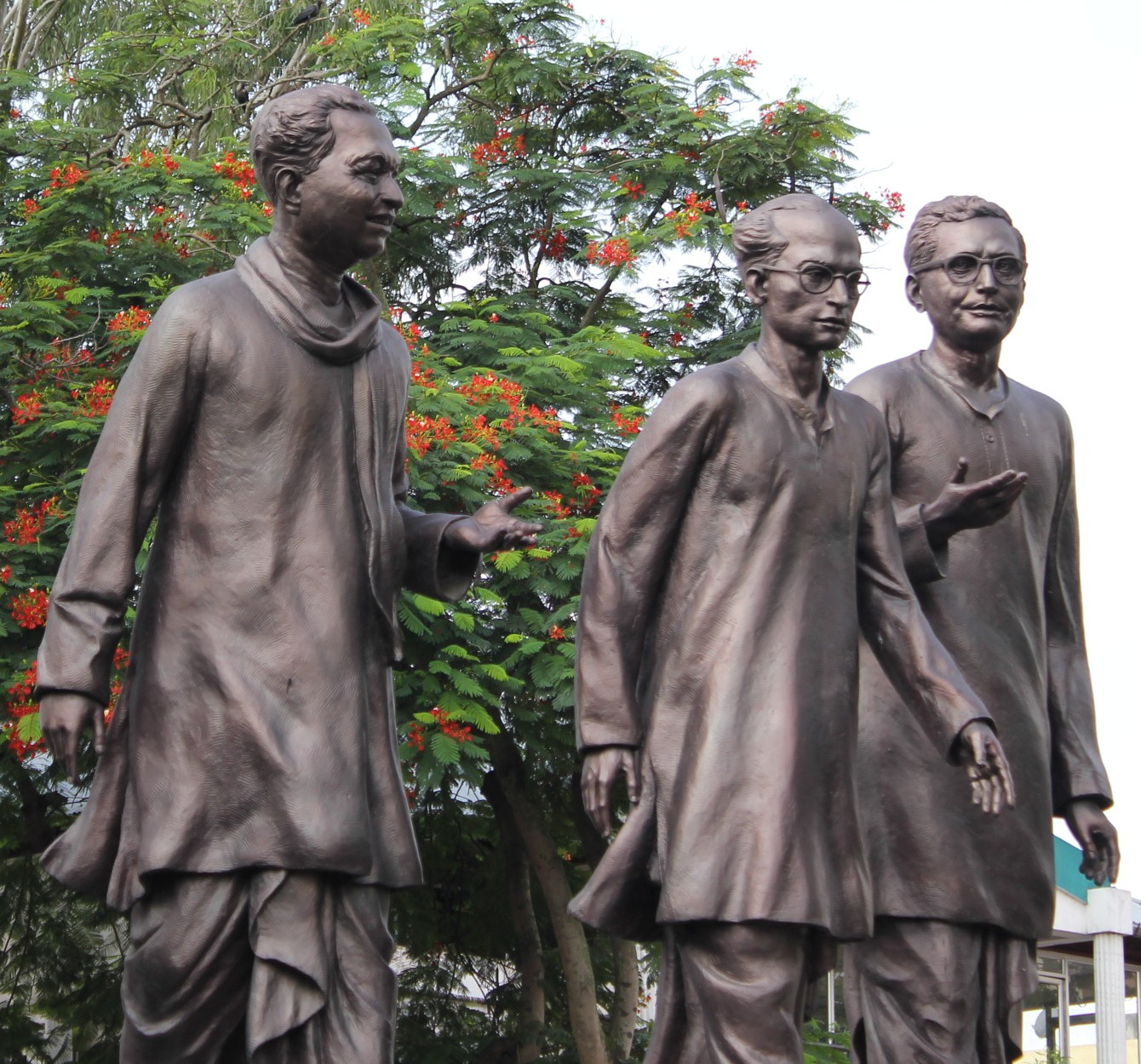
Statue of Kalaguru, Rupkonwar and Natasurjya at Tezpur (Side view)

Bishnu Prasad Rabha was born in Dacca, Bengal Presidency, British India on 31 January 1909 to Gethi Mech and Rai Bahadur Gopal Chandra Muchahary, who was a police employee in the British regime. He was born to a Bodo family, but since he was raised by a Rabha family, he adopted 'Rabha' as his surname. Bishnu Rabha attended Tezpur Government High School and later went to Calcutta for higher education. He completed his BSC exam from St. Paul's Cathedral Mission College and joined the Ripon College (now Surendranath College) at the University of Calcutta for a BSc degree.

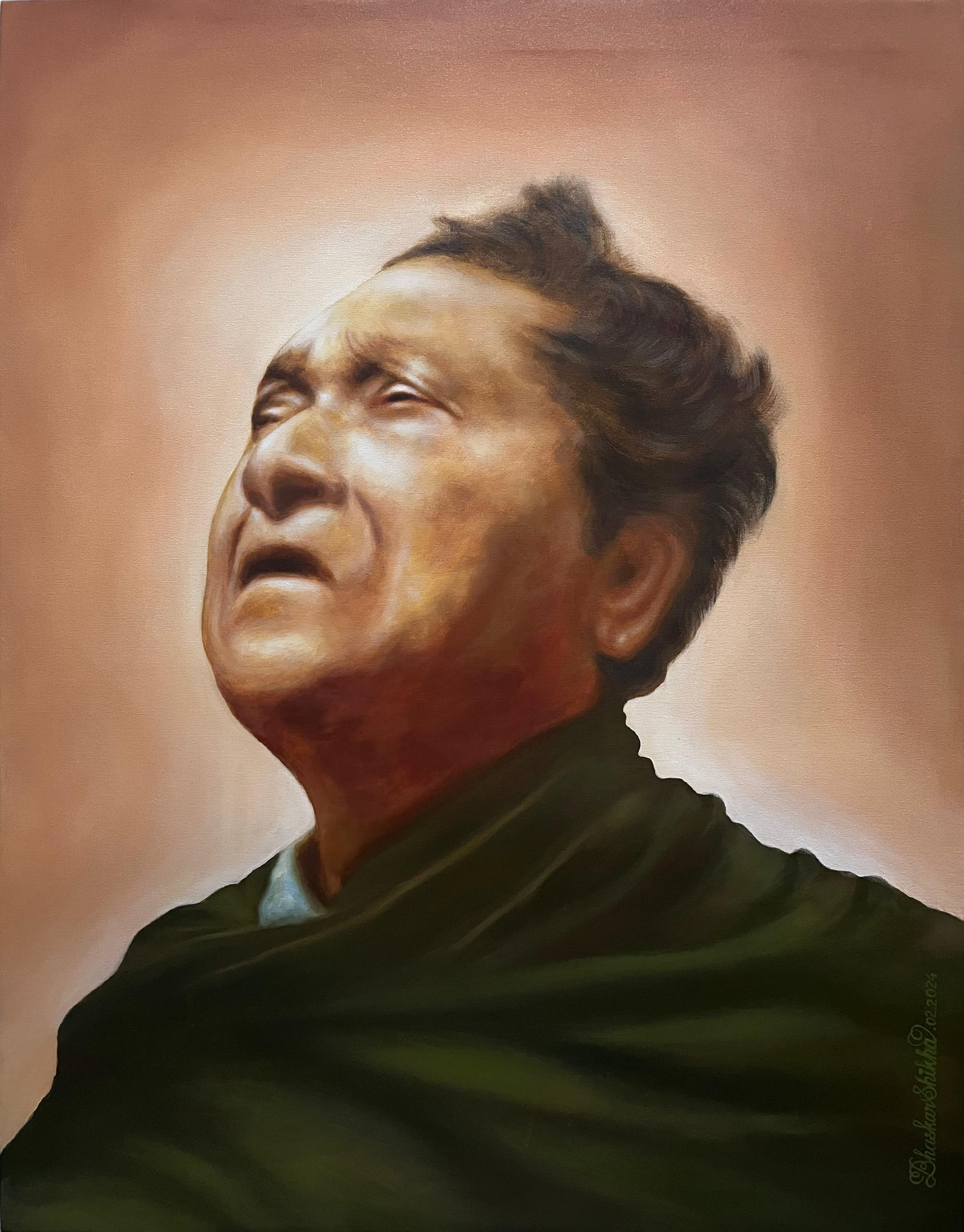
Portrait of Bishnu Rabha preserved at Cotton University, Guwahati, Artist - Bhaskar Shikha

From an early stage, he played an active role in the struggle for Indian Independence. He came to be influenced by left wing ideas and came closer to the Communist Party of India. However, when Germany attacked Soviet Union during second world war and the Indian communists decided to work with the British government, a section of the party favoured a different approach – to oppose British imperialism and European fascism simultaneously. So, a split happened in the communist party and in 1945 he finally joined the Revolutionary Communist Party of India (RCPI). In 1951, after the death of Jyoti Prasad Agarwala, he became the president of the Assam branch of Indian People's Theatre Association (IPTA).

His work Bane' Ke'bang portrays the life worlds of various indigenous Assamese communities of Assam. His other works include Mising Koneng, Sonpahi, Axomiya Kristir Hamuh Abhakh, and Atit Axom. His interest for the upliftment and liberation of the weaker sections of society is visible in his works. Rabha was an eminent freedom fighter. His meaning of freedom however is not simply freedom from British rule. But it meant freedom from capitalism, freedom from wage-slavery, freedom from poverty and all social evils. In his own words, "I am fighting for a revolution from the realm of necessity to the realm of freedom". He dedicated his entire life for this freedom movement.

He donated an ancestral estate of 2500 bigha land received from the British government in favour of the peasants. His slogan was "Haal Jaar Maati Taar" means "those who cultivate should own the land". The present day Tezpur University stands upon the land donated by him. His entire life was characterised by a restlessness to work for the people, and he kept on moving around like a nomad. He was also an excellent mass mobiliser. His speeches and lectures could touch the heart of the masses. However, his political struggle was never ended with individual power and seeking motive. It was only to give power at the hands of the masses. He even said that the independence achieved in 1947 was simply a farce. It is because in spite of the freedom the poor and weaker sections of the society that remained the same and Assam did not get independence from colonial India as sovereign Assam was not established. According to him, the real struggle begins after 1947.

Apart from being a revolutionary, he was also worked as an academic and researcher. This was despite the fact that due to participation in freedom struggle he was forced by the British colonial regime to leave Ripon College at Calcutta and he transferred to Victoria College (now Acharya Brojendra Nath Seal College) at Cooch Bihar. He was not able to continue with his formal studies even there, due to frequent raids conducted by the police against his hostel and was compelled to give up his formal educational career forever.

His son Prithiraj Rava is a politician.

== Cultural influence ==
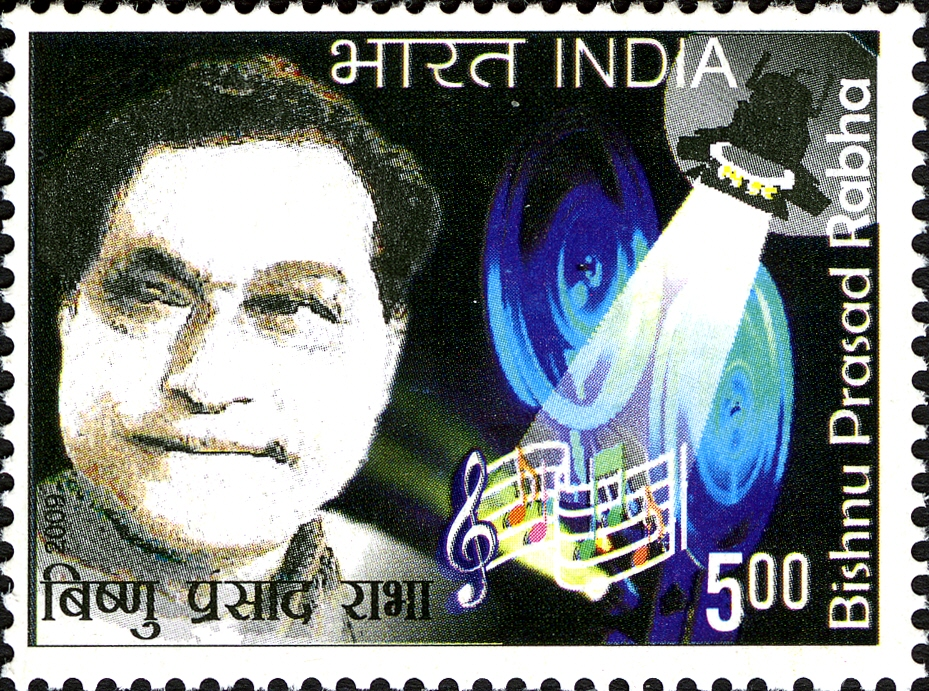
A 2009 stamp dedicated to Bishnu Prasad Rabha

The level of influence exerted by the Kala Guru can be observed through the fact that most cultural music competitions of Assam feature a segment called Bishnu Rava Sangeet related to his compositions, lyrics and verse. Bishnu Prasad was an established singer. He had learnt Borgeet of Shrimanta Shankar Deva and gave the genre a new significance for the modern times. There are more than a hundred songs composed by him. His songs are collectively called as Bishnu Rava Sangeet. This was a new genre of Assamese. In his songs one can see diverse themes like tributes to the Mother Nature, the exploitation of the peasant masses by the colonial rulers, the revolts of the workers at tea industries etc. His songs also reflect his revolutionary ideal and the country's struggle for real freedom. Some of his songs are popular among children even today and will be, for all times to come. Some leading numbers include Xurore Deulore, Bilote Halise, etc. He advocated the need to be aware of other people's cultures, views, religions, etc., and advocated for a world community.

His compositions include song like Para jonomor khubho logonor, logon ukali gol, roi roi keteki, tilai tilai, kurua botah and many more to mention. He was a great actor. He used to perform dramas at Baan theatre of Tezpur, which is regarded to be one of the oldest cultural activity centres of Assam. He also translated the famous song of revolution "Internationale" by Eugène Pottier into Assamese. His paintings are still preserved in his residence at Tezpur.

=== Theatre ===
There have been many live performances at the Baan theatre in Tezpur which is famously connected to Bishnu Rabha. This theatre (Ban Stage) where many of Bishnu Rabha's plays have been staged is designed by renowned architect Upendra Kumar Baruah.

=== Films ===
Rabha was also recognised as a film director, music composer (Siraj) and actor (Era Bator Sur). He also assisted in making of the first Assamese film Joymoti, by Jyoti Prasad Agarwala. He was also a recognised film director.

== Recognition and awards ==
Rabha's songs are recognised as 'Rabha Sangeet'.

There is an award given in his honour for achievements in the cultural/music world of Assam by the state government.

=== Kalaguru Bishnu Rabha Award 2016 ===
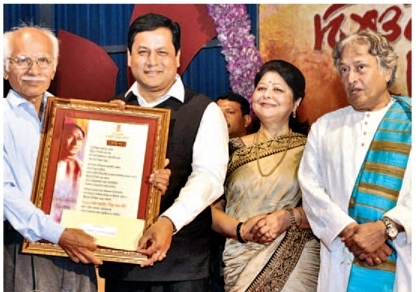
Hon'ble Chief Minister of Assam, along with Ustad Amjad Ali Khan (Right), presenting the Bishnu Rabha Award 2016 to Veteran Artist Girish Chandra Borah

The relevance of the ideals of Kalaguru Bishnu Prasad Rabha, the musical and artistic genius who transcended man-made barriers to unite diverse communities was remembered on the occasion of his death anniversary by Assam. The Bishnu Rabha Award for 2016 were also presented on Monday to well-known artist Girish Chandra Bora and prominent Kathak exponent Bipul Das at a function organised at Rabindra Bhawan in Guwahati by the Directorate of Cultural Affairs.

The award carrying Rs 100,000 each, a citation and other gifts was presented to the distinguished personalities by Chief Minister Sarbananda Sonowal.

Acknowledging the role of the cultural brigade in nation building, Sonowal announced that in the coming days the government would come up with a special policy for the welfare of the artistes. He also assured that Rabindra Bhawan would be developed and within a few months the auditorium will provide a new experience to performers and viewers alike. Stressing the need to promote the ideals of the Kalaguru among the young generation, Sonowal said that by imbibing the humanistic values that Bishnu Prasad Rabha stood for, Assam can be propelled on the road towards real development. Sonowal also laid importance on holistic development of the youth so that they can bring the desired changes with their work culture and commitment.

In his acceptance speech, Girish Chandra Bora said that the honour conferred on him will motivate him to continue with his work with greater zeal. He said that an artist never works with the intention of bagging an award or a favour but creates for the satisfaction of his heart. He also added that the literary and cultural contributions of the revolutionary Bishnu Prasad Rabha have always been an inspiration for him. On the other hand, speaking on the occasion, sarod maestro Amjad Ali Khan recalled the multifaceted personality of the Kalaguru, particularly his patriotism and cultural leanings, and said that music is an important aspect of life, and it does not belong to any religion.

=== Memorial Park ===
Memorial inside Bishnu Rabha Smriti Udyan

The Bishnu Rabha Smriti Udyan has been set up as a memorial park in his honour. It is located on the banks of the Brahmaputra near Tezpur in a plot adjacent to the Bhairabi Temple.

The park is a result of the hard work of his middle son Hemraj Rabha who took the initiative to pay tribute to his father and started the construction. The project was later on taken by the government of Assam. It contains the cremation spot of the maestro. Apart from it, many of his unforgettable works are sculpted into the walls. The cremation spot lies on the bank of the Brahmaputra as a result of which it was suffering from soil erosion. But now it has been provided with embankments to prevent it and preserve it. Nowadays it has become a major site of attraction for his devotees. People often visit this place to offer homage.

== See also ==
- List of Indian writers
- Assamese literature
- History of Assamese literature
- Assamese cinema
- Culture of Assam
