= Amalendu Guha =

Indian historian, economist and poet

Amalendu Guha (30 January 1924 – 7 May 2015), was an eminent Marxist historian, poet and a littérateur from India.

He was born in Imphal, Manipur. He completed an MA at Presidency College. He started his teaching career at Darrang College, Tezpur, and also taught at Gokhale Institute of Politics and Economics, Pune, and thereafter at Delhi School of Economics. Guha was retired from Centre for Studies in Social Sciences, Calcutta. Guha's body was donated to the Gauhati Medical College here after a formal tribute was paid with full state honour.

== Books ==
- Planter Raj to Swaraj – Freedom Struggle & Electoral Politics in Assam
- Medieval and Early Colonial Assam: Society, Polity, Economy
