= Brindaban Goswami =

Indian politician

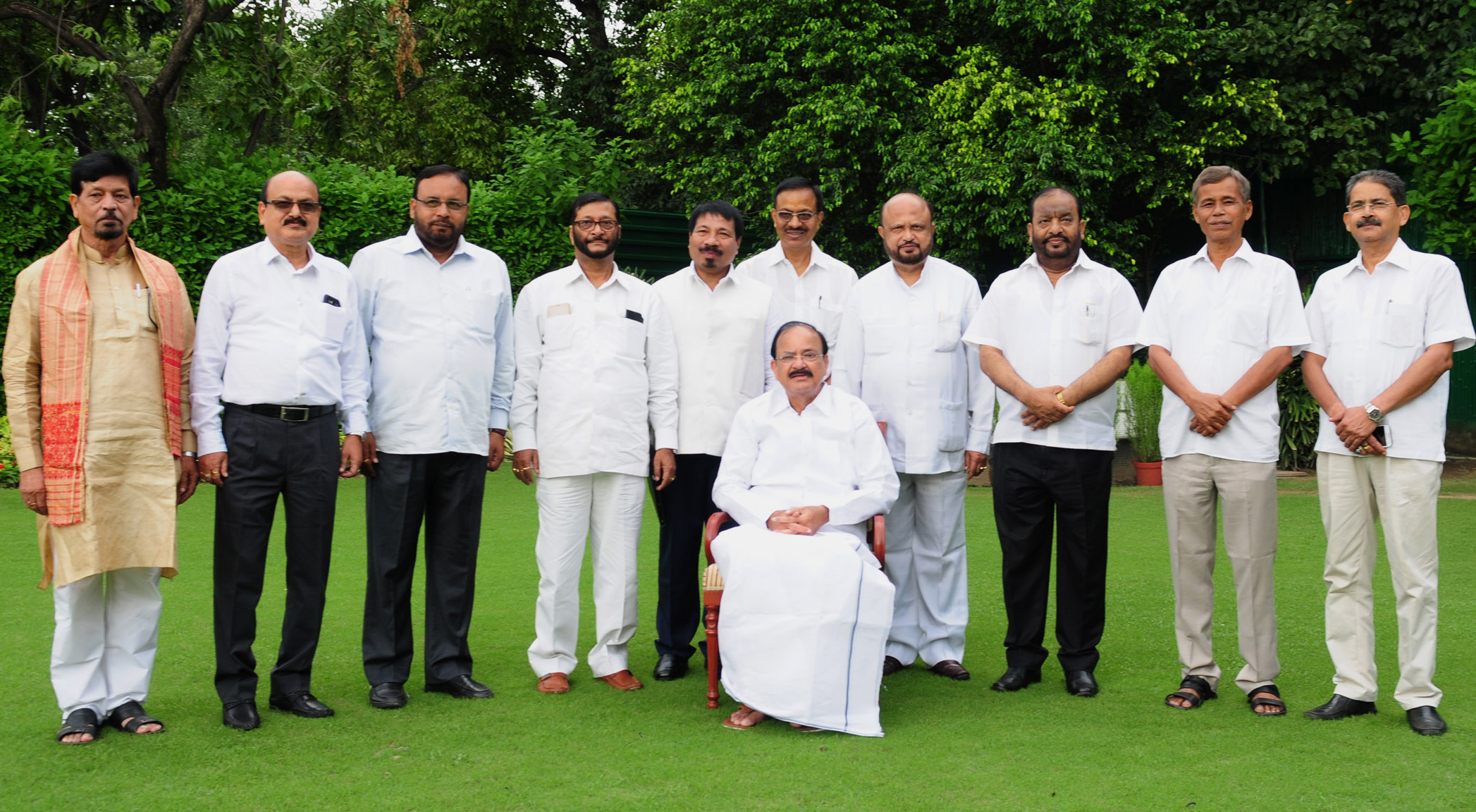
- Brindaban Goswami from the left corner

Member of Assam Legislative Assembly Tezpur
- In office 2016-2021
- Preceded by: Rajen Borthakur
- Succeeded by: Prithiraj Rava
- Constituency: Tezpur Constituency
- In office 1996–2011
- Preceded by: Rajen Borthakur
- Succeeded by: Bijit Saikia
- In office 1985–1990
- Preceded by: Nabin Chandra Kath Hazarika
- Succeeded by: Bijit Saikia

President, Asom Gana Parishad
- In office September, 2001 – September 2008
- Preceded by: Prafulla Kumar Mahanta
- Succeeded by: Chandra Mohan Patowary

Minister of Education, Government of Assam
- In office 1985–1990

Personal details
- Party: Asom Gana Parishad
- Other political affiliations: Notun Assam Gana Parishad
- Spouse: Labonya Goswami
- Education: Darrang College

Brindaban Goswami was an Indian politician, a leader of Asom Gana Parishad and former Education Minister in the Government of Assam. He was one of the student leaders who came into limelight during Assam Agitation. He was a member of split group of Asom Gana Parishad known as Natun Asom Gana Parishad when it was formed due to Prafulla Kumar Mahanta. He was also the President of Asom Gana Parishad for a brief period of time.

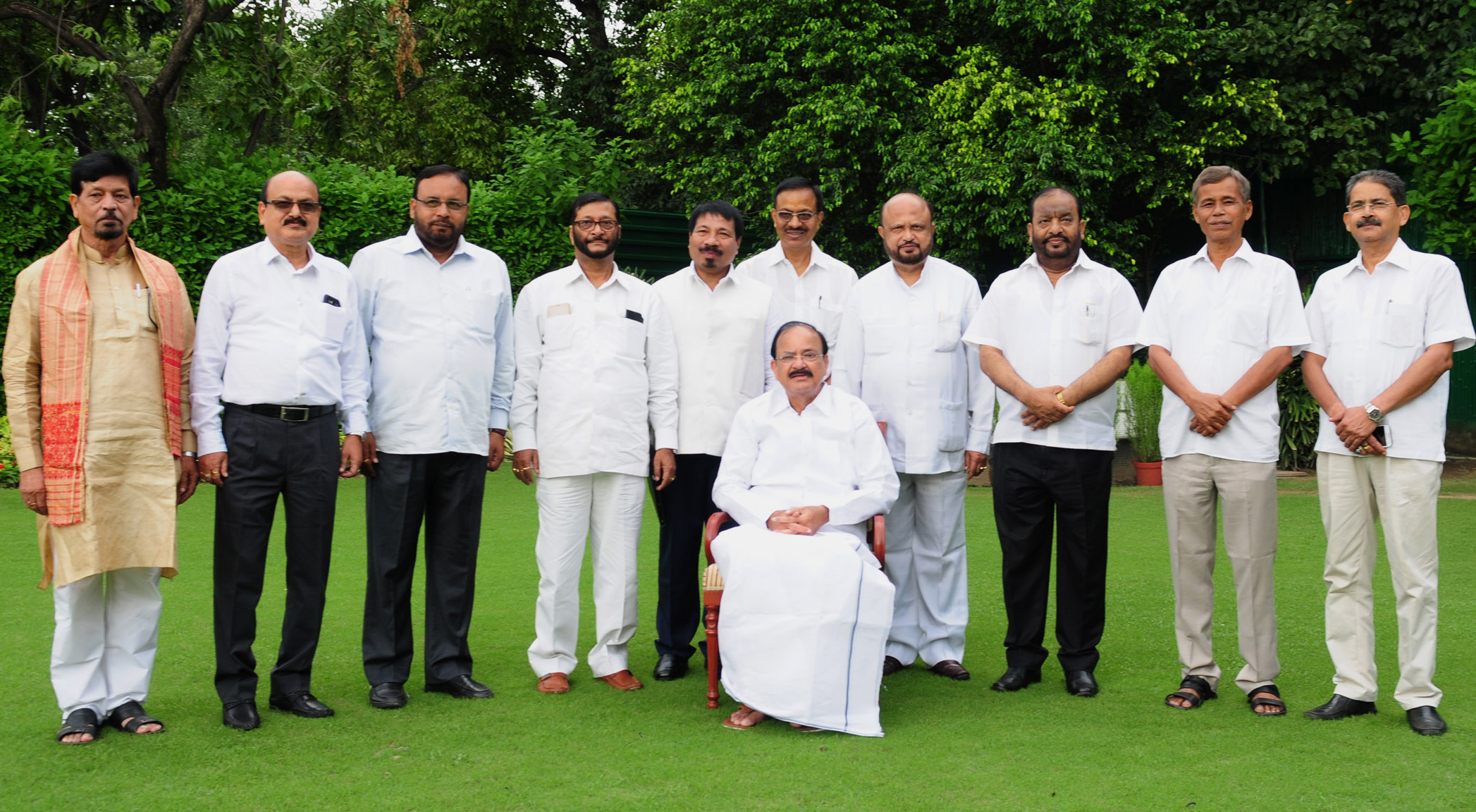
Brindaban Goswami and other AGP leaders meeting Vice-President of India, V. Naidu.

During Assam Legislative Assembly election in 2006, Goswami was named as chief ministerial candidate of Asom Gana Parishad. He is also five times Member of Legislative Assembly from Tezpur constituency.
