= Prithibi Majhi =

17th Speaker of the Assam Legislative Assembly

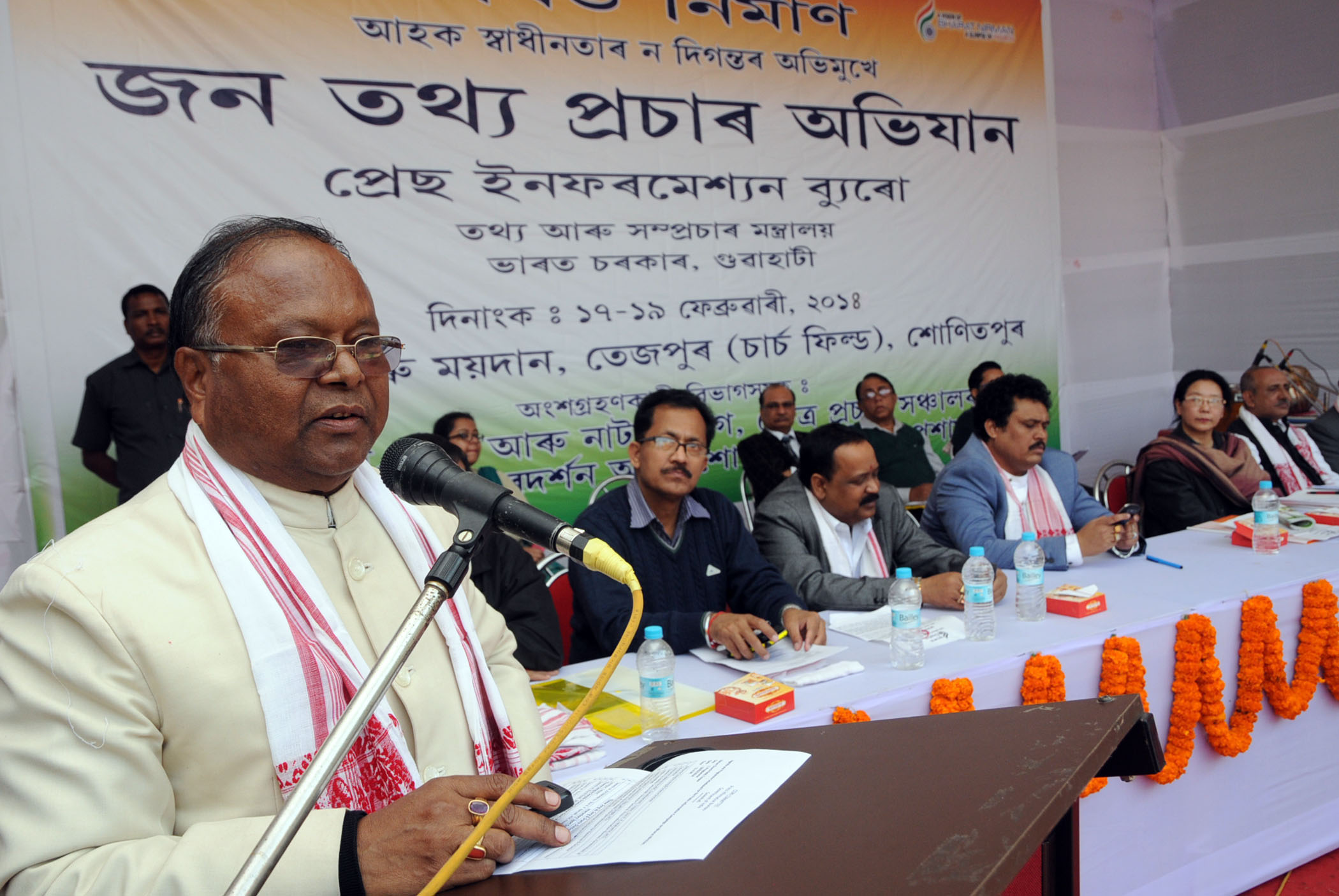
- Majhi (left) in 2014

Speaker of the Assam Legislative Assembly
- In office 30 May 2001 – 19 May 2006
- Deputy: Tanka Bahadur Rai
- Preceded by: Ganesh Kutum
- Succeeded by: Tanka Bahadur Rai

Cabinet Minister, Government of Assam
- In office 21 May 2006 – 26 January 2015
- Chief Minister: Tarun Gogoi
- Portfolios: Planning and Development (2006–2011); Labour and Employment, Tea Tribes Welfare (2006–2015); Water Resources (2008–2011); Revenue and Disaster Management, Relief and Rehabilitation (2011–2015)
- Preceded by: Tarun Gogoi (Planning); Rameswar Dhanowar (Labour, Tea Tribes Welfare); Bharat Narah (WR); Bhumidhar Barman (R&DM, Relief & Rehab.)
- Succeeded by: Tanka Bahadur Rai (Planning); Tarun Gogoi (Labour); Atuwa Munda (Tea Tribes Welfare); Rajib Lochan Pegu (WR); Bhumidhar Barman (R&DM); Tarun Gogoi (Relief & Rehab.)

Deputy Speaker of the Assam Legislative Assembly
- In office 23 March 1993 – 11 May 1996
- Speaker: Debesh Chandra Chakravorty
- Preceded by: Debesh Chandra Chakravorty
- Succeeded by: Nurul Hussain

Member of Parliament, Rajya Sabha
- In office 10 April 1984 – 9 April 1990
- Constituency: Assam

Member, Assam Legislative Assembly
- In office 1991–1996
- Preceded by: Atul Chandra Koch
- Succeeded by: Atuwa Munda
- Constituency: Tingkhong
- In office 1996–2016
- Preceded by: Haren Bhumij
- Succeeded by: Rituparna Baruah
- Constituency: Lahowal

Personal details
- Born: 24 January 1951 (age 74); Dibrugarh, Assam, India
- Spouse(s): Anita Majhi (m. 1978, d.) Tarulata Kakoti Majhi (m. 1997)
- Children: 4
- Parent(s): Birsingh Majhi (father); Sita Majhi (mother)

Prithibi Majhi is an Indian politician representing the Indian National Congress. He was a Member of Parliament, representing Assam in the Rajya Sabha, the upper house of India's Parliament. He was a Deputy Speaker and Speaker of the Assam Legislative Assembly and a minister in the Tarun Gogoi cabinet.

== Early life and education ==
Prithibi Majhi was born on 24 January 1951 to the Late Birsingh Majhi and Sita Majhi. Majhi received his B.A. from DHSK College in Dibrugarh and L.L.B. from Dispur Law College at Gauhati University.

== Political career ==
Majhi was first elected to the Assembly in 1991 from Tingkhong. He was then elected in 1996 but for Lahowal. He was then a Member of the Rajya Sabha. In 1993 he was made the Deputy Speaker and in 2001 the Speaker of the Assam Legislative Assembly.

== Personal life ==
He first married the late Anita Majhi. After her death, he later married Dr. Tarulata Kakoti Majhi on 10 December 1997. He and his second wife had 2 daughters and 2 sons. His wife is the vice Principal of Dibrugarh Nursing College. Majhi gave his wife the 1st Birsingh Majhi Award in memory of his father in 2012.

== Positions ==
- Secretary, Assam Tea Garden Tribes Students Association, (1968 to 1978)
- General Secretary, All Assam Santal Committee
- Deputy Chief Executive Councillor, Dibrugarh Mahkuma Parishad, Dibrugarh (1979–83)
- Chief Administrator, Dibrugarh Mahkuma Parishad (1983–84)
- Member of Working Committee, INTUC (Assam Branch).
- Vice President, Assam Chah Mazdoor Sangha (Affiliated to INTUC), (1993-1996)
- Member, Working Committee, Assam Chah Mazdoor Sangha
- Adviser, Adibasi Socio-Educational and Cultural Association, Assam
- Vice Chairman, Assam Tea Employees Welfare Board (1991-1993)
- General Secretary, Assam Tea Employees Industrial Co-operative Organisation Limited (ATEICOL) Employees Union(1978-1983).
- Member, Rajya Sabha, (1984-1990).
- Member of Legislative Assembly from 119-Tingkhong Constituency for 1991-1996 term.
- Chairman, Assam State Textile Corporation (1991-1993)
- Deputy Speaker, Assam Legislative Assembly (1993-1996)
- Member of Legislative Assembly from 117-Lahowal Constituency (1996-2001).
- General Secretary, Assam Pradesh Congress Committee(I) in 1997.
- Honorary Member, All India Santal Writers Association.
- Vice President, Assam Tea & Ex-Tea Tribes, Literature Art & Cultural Parishad under Srimanta Sankardev Kala Khetra, Guwahati.
- Member of Legislative Assembly from 117-Lahowal Constituency for 2001-2006 term
- Elected Speaker of Assam Legislative Assembly, 2001.
- Chairman, NERCPA, 2002
- Chairman, North East Regional Institute of Parliamentary Studies, Training and Research (2002-2006).
- Member of Legislative Assembly from 117-Lahowal Constituency for 2006-2011 term
- Minister, Planning and Development, Labour and Employment and Tea-Tribes Welfare, Government of Assam, from 2006 to 2008.
- Minister, Water Resources, Labour and Employment and Tea-Tribes Welfare, Government of Assam, from 2008 to 2011.
- President, International Santhal Council from 2008.
- Permanent Invitee to Working Committee, INTUC (Assam Branch)
- Permanent Invitee to Working Committee, Assam Chah Mazdoor Sangha.
- Elected Member of Assam Legislative Assembly from 117-Lahowal Constituency on 2011.
- Elected Deputy Leader, Congress Legislative Party, Assam Legislative Assembly, in 2011.
- Minister, Revenue and Disaster Management, Labour and Employment and Tea-Tribes Welfare, Government of Assam, from 2011-2015.
