= 1972 elections in India =

Elections in India
- 1972

The 1972 elections in India were a set of sub-national elections held from March to June 1972 across several Indian states and territories, including Assam, Andhra Pradesh, Bihar, Gujarat, Haryana, Himachal Pradesh, Madhya Pradesh, Maharashtra, Manipur, Meghalaya, Mizoram, Mysore, Punjab, Rajasthan, Tripura, West Bengal, Goa, Daman and Diu, and Jammu and Kashmir. In most of these contests the faction of the formerly-united Indian National Congress associated with Indira Gandhi, the Requisitionists formed the respective governments, representing a defeat for the Syndicate Congress.

== Summary of Legislative Assembly elections ==
Date(s)	State	Government before election	Chief Minister before election	Government after election	Chief Minister after election	Maps
5 March 1972	Himachal Pradesh	Indian National Congress	Indian National Congress	Indian National Congress (R)	Yashwant Singh Parmar	
5 March 1972	Bihar	President's Rule		Indian National Congress (R)	Kedar Pandey	
5 March 1972	Maharashtra	Indian National Congress (R)	Vasantrao Naik	Indian National Congress (R)	Vasantrao Naik	
5 and 8 March 1972	Gujarat	President's Rule		Indian National Congress (R)	Ghanshyam Oza	
6 March 1972	Rajasthan	Indian National Congress (R)	Barkatullah Khan	Indian National Congress (R)	Barkatullah Khan	
6 March 1972	Manipur	President's Rule		Manipur People's Party	Mohammed Alimuddin	
7 March 1972	Assam	Indian National Congress	Mahendra Mohan Choudhry	Indian National Congress (R)	Sarat Chandra Singha	
8 March 1972	Madhya Pradesh	Indian National Congress	Shyama Charan Shukla	Indian National Congress	Prakash Chandra Sethi	
9 March 1972	Meghalaya	New state was created		All Party Hill Leaders Conference	Williamson A. Sangma	
11 March 1972	West Bengal	President's Rule		Indian National Congress (R)	Siddhartha Shankar Ray	
11 March 1972	Haryana	Indian National Congress	Bansi Lal	Indian National Congress (R)	Bansi Lal	
11 March 1972	Tripura	President's Rule		Indian National Congress (R)	Sukhamoy Sen Gupta	
15 March 1972	Andhra Pradesh	Indian National Congress (R)	Kasu Brahmananda Reddy	Indian National Congress (R)	P. V. Narasimha Rao	
8 April 1972	Mizoram	New state was created		Independent	C. Chhunga	
8 April 1972	Mysore	President's Rule		Indian National Congress (R)	D. Devaraj Urs	
8 April 1972	Punjab	President's Rule		Indian National Congress (R)	Zail Singh	
8 April 1972	Goa, Daman and Diu	Maharashtrawadi Gomantak Party	Dayanand Bandodkar	Maharashtrawadi Gomantak Party	Dayanand Bandodkar	
17 June 1972	Jammu and Kashmir	Indian National Congress (R)	Syed Mir Qasim	Indian National Congress (R)	Syed Mir Qasim	

== Legislative Assembly elections ==
=== Assam ===
Party	Votes	%	Seats	+/–
Indian National Congress	1,976,209	53.20	95	+22
Samyukta Socialist Party	214,342	5.77	4	0
Communist Party of India	209,550	5.64	3	–4
Plain Tribals Council of Assam	62,108	1.67	1	New
Swatantra Party	21,663	0.58	1	–2
Others	125,928	3.39	0	0
Independents	1,104,977	29.75	10	–16
Total	3,714,777	100.00	114	+9
Valid votes	3,714,777	96.47		
Invalid/blank votes	136,122	3.53		
Total votes	3,850,899	100.00		
Registered voters/turnout	6,328,537	60.85		
Source: ECI

=== Andhra Pradesh ===
Party	Votes	%	+/–	Seats	+/–
Indian National Congress	7,474,255	52.29	▲6.87%	219	▲54
Communist Party of India	854,742	5.98	▼1.80%	7	▼4
Swatantra Party	282,949	1.98	▼7.86%	2	▼27
Communist Party of India (Marxist)	454,038	3.18	▼4.43%	1	▼5
Sampurna Telangana Praja Samithi	237,934	1.66	new party	1	new party
Bharatiya Jana Sangh	266,192	1.86	▼0.25%	0	▼3
Indian National Congress (Organisation)	45,303	0.32	new party	0	new party
Dravida Munnetra Kazhagam	36,466	0.26	new party	0	new party
Republican Party of India (Khobragade)	21,357	0.15	new party	0	new party
Samyukta Socialist Party	9,952	0.07	▼0.29%	0	Steady
Minorities League	3,582	0.03	new party	0	new party
Backward Classes Mahasabha	910	0.01	new party	0	new party
Independents	4,604,943	32.22	▲5.81%	57	▼11
Total	14,292,623	100.00	–	287	Steady
Valid votes	14,292,623	97.27			
Invalid/blank votes	400,407	2.73			
Total votes	14,693,030	100.00			
Registered voters/turnout	24,607,903	59.71			

=== Bihar ===
Party	Votes	%	Seats
Indian National Congress	5,688,002	33.12	167
Samyukta Socialist Party/Socialist Party	2,814,799	16.39	33
Indian National Congress (O)	2,544,841	14.82	30
Bharatiya Jan Sangh	2,007,314	11.69	25
Communist Party of India	1,192,746	6.94	35
Communist Party of India (Marxist)	276,649	1.61	–
Hindustani Shoshit Dal	219,341	1.28	3
Swatantra Party	121,238	0.71	1
All India Jharkhand Party	149,754	0.87	3
Jharkhand	90,717	0.53	1
Bihar Prant Hul Jharkhand	90,234	0.53	2
Socialist Unity Centre of India	47,732	0.28	–
Progressive Hull Jharkhand Party (Shibu Group)	32,631	0.19	1
All India Forward Bloc	20,525	0.12	–
Bharatiya Kranti Dal	5,609	0.03	–
Indian Union Muslim League	5,317	0.03	–
Revolutionary Socialist Party (India)	4,677	0.03	–
Backward Classes Party of India	4,386	0.03	–
All India Labour Party	3,859	0.02	–
Revolutionary Socialist Party of India (Marxist-Leninist)	2,968	0.02	–
Chota Nagpur Bhumi Rakshak Party	1,274	0.01	–
Republican Party of India	907	0.01	–
Independent	1,849,613	10.77	17
Total	17,175,133	100.00	318
Valid votes	17,175,133	98.09	
Invalid/blank votes	333,560	1.91	
Total votes	17,508,693	100.00	
Registered voters/turnout	33,164,286	52.79	

=== Goa, Daman & Diu ===
Summary of results of the Goa, Daman & Diu Legislative Assembly election, 1972
Political Party	Seats contested	Seats won	Number of Votes	% of Votes	Seat change
Maharashtrawadi Gomantak Party	23	18	116,855	38.30%	▲2
United Goans Party (Superia Group)	26	10	99,156	32.50%	▼2
Indian National Congress	19	1	41,612	13.64%	▲1
Independents	36	1	28,874	9.64%	▼1
Total	138	30	305,077		

=== Gujarat ===
#	Party	Seats Contested	Seats Won	Forfeited Deposits	Popular Vote	Voting Percentage	Vote % In Seats Contested
1	BJS	100	3	69	643032	9.29%	15.03%
2	CPI	11	1	10	32439	0.47%	7.00%
3	CPM	4	0	4	15500	0.22%	9.57%
4	INC	168	140	1	3527035	50.93%	50.93%
5	NCO	138	16	29	1626736	23.49%	28.95%
6	SOP	15	0	12	50009	0.72%	9.11%
7	SWA	47	0	42	123589	1.78%	6.32%
8	RSP	1	0	0	8649	0.12%	22.33%
9	HMS	1	0	1	136	0.00%	0.35%
10	IND	337	8	299	897584	12.96%	15.54%

	Men	Women	Total
NO. OF ELECTORS	6370260	6137124	12507384
Votes	4020234	3246959	7267193
Percentage	63.11%	52.91%	58.10%
Valid votes	6924709		
Invalid votes	342484		
NO. OF POLLING STATIONS	17994		
AVERAGE NO. OF ELECTORS PER POLLING STATION	695		
	Men	Women	Total
NO. OF CONTESTANTS	852	21	873
ELECTED	167	1	168
FORFEITED DEPOSITS	0	0	0

=== Haryana ===
Party	Votes	%	Seats
Indian National Congress	1,639,405	46.91	52
Indian National Congress (Organization)	377,427	10.80	12
Vishal Haryana Party	242,444	6.94	3
Bharatiya Jana Sangh	228,761	6.55	2
Akhil Bhartiya Arya Sabha	77,234	2.21	1
Communist Party of India	69,335	1.98	0
Communist Party of India (Marxist)	12,617	0.36	0
Socialist Party	8,333	0.24	0
Republican Party of India	7,467	0.21	0
Republican Party of India (Khobragade)	3,636	0.10	0
Socialist Unity Center of India	2,640	0.08	0
Bharatiya Kranti Dal	1,486	0.04	0
Akhil Bharat Hindu Mahasabha	400	0.01	0
Independents	823,611	23.57	11
Total	3,494,796	100.00	81
Valid votes	3,494,796	79.12	
Invalid/blank votes	922,520	20.88	
Total votes	4,417,316	100.00	
Registered voters/turnout	5,091,082	86.77	
Source: ECI

=== Himachal Pradesh ===
Party	Votes	%	Seats	+/–
Indian National Congress	467,592	53.24	53	+19
Bharatiya Jana Sangh	68,032	7.75	5	New
Lok Raj Party Himachal Pradesh	44,067	5.02	2	–9
Communist Party of India (Marxist)	9,654	1.10	1	–3
Others	40,590	4.62	0	0
Independents	248,310	28.27	7	–9
Total	878,245	100.00	68	+8
Valid votes	878,245	97.39		
Invalid/blank votes	23,506	2.61		
Total votes	901,751	100.00		
Registered voters/turnout	1,805,448	49.95		
Source: ECI

=== Jammu and Kashmir ===
Party	Votes	%	Seats	+/–
Indian National Congress	764,492	55.44	58	–3
Bharatiya Jana Sangh	135,778	9.85	3	0
Jamaat-e-Islami Kashmir	98,985	7.18	5	New
Others	10,689	0.78	0	0
Independents	369,062	26.76	9	–6
Total	1,379,006	100.00	75	0
Valid votes	1,379,006	96.52		
Invalid/blank votes	49,689	3.48		
Total votes	1,428,695	100.00		
Registered voters/turnout	2,297,951	62.17		
Source: ECI

=== Madhya Pradesh ===
#	Party	Seats Contested	Seats won	Seats Changed	% Votes
1	Indian National Congress	289	220	▲53	47.93%
1	Bharatiya Jana Sangh	260	48	▼30	28.64%
3	Samyukta Socialist Party/Socialist Party	172	7	N/A	6.24%
4	Communist Party of India	30	3	▲2	1.02%
7	Independent	296	18	▼4	14.73%
	Total		296		

=== Maharashtra ===
Summary of results of the Maharashtra State Assembly election, 1972
Political Party	No. of candidates	No. of elected	Seat change	Number of Votes	% of Votes	Change in vote %
Indian National Congress 222 / 270 (82%)	271	222	▲19	8,535,832	56.36%	▲9.33%
Peasants and Workers Party of India 7 / 270 (3%)	58	7	▼12	856,986	5.66%	▼2.14%
Bharatiya Jana Sangh 5 / 270 (2%)	122	5	▲1	947,266	6.25%	▼1.92%
Samyukta Socialist Party/Socialist Party 3 / 270 (1%)	52	3	▼1	693,797	4.58%	▼0.03%
Republican Party of India 2 / 270 (0.7%)	118	2	▼3	570,533	3.77%	▼2.89%
Communist Party of India 2 / 270 (0.7%)	44	2	▼8	412,857	2.73%	▼2.14%
All India Forward Bloc 2 / 270 (0.7%)	26	2	▲2	363,547	2.40%	▲2.40% (New Party)
Shiv Sena 1 / 270 (0.4%)	26	1	▲1	279,210	1.84%	▲1.84% (New Party)
Communist Party of India (Marxist) 1 / 270 (0.4%)	20	1	Steady	117,134	0.77%	▼0.31%
Bharatiya Kranti Dal 1 / 270 (0.4%)	2	1	▲1	31,508	0.21%	▲0.21% (New Party)
Indian Union Muslim League 1 / 270 (0.4%)	1	1	▲1	27,138	0.18%	▲0.18% (New Party)
Republican Party of India (Khobragade)	56	0	(New Party)	202,935	1.34%	▲1.34% (New Party)
Indian National Congress (Organisation)	49	0	(Split in INC)	162,433	1.07%	(Split in INC)
Swatantra Party	5	0	Steady	14,269	0.09%	▼1.03%
Independents 23 / 270 (9%)	343	23	▲7	1,920,667	12.68%	▼1.89%
Total	1196	270	Steady	15,146,171	60.63%	▼4.21%

=== Manipur ===
Party	Votes	%	Seats	+/–
Indian National Congress	135,678	30.02	17	+1
Manipur Peoples Party	91,148	20.17	15	New
Communist Party of India	45,765	10.13	5	+4
Socialist Party (India)	24,195	5.35	3	New
Indian National Congress (Organisation)	10,699	2.37	1	New
Communist Party of India (Marxist)	2,988	0.66	0	–
Bharatiya Jana Sangh	1,004	0.22	0	New
Independents	140,471	31.08	19	+10
Total	451,948	100.00	60	+30
Valid votes	451,948	97.89		
Invalid/blank votes	9,744	2.11		
Total votes	461,692	100.00		
Registered voters/turnout	608,403	75.89		
Source: ECI

=== Meghalaya ===
Party	Votes	%	Seats
All Party Hill Leaders Conference (AHL)	73,851	35.67	32
Indian National Congress (INC)	20,474	9.89	9
Communist Party of India (CPI)	1,182	0.57	0
Independents (IND)	111,506	53.86	19^{[a]}
Total	207,013	100.00	60
Source: Election Commission of India

=== Mizoram ===
Party	Votes	%	Seats
Indian National Congress	34,421	30.91	6
Samyukta Socialist Party	1,713	1.54	0
Independents	75,224	67.55	24
Total	111,358	100.00	30
Valid votes	111,358	97.35	
Invalid/blank votes	3,028	2.65	
Total votes	114,386	100.00	
Registered voters/turnout	156,901	72.90	
Source: ECI

=== Mysore ===
Summary of results of the Mysore Legislative Assembly election, 1972
Political Party	Contestants	Seats won	Seat change	Votes	Vote share	Net change
Indian National Congress (Requisitionists)	212	165	▲39	4,698,824	52.17%	▲3.74%
Indian National Congress (Organisation)	176	24		2,361,308	26.22%	▲26.22%
Communist Party of India	4	3		88,978	0.99%	
Samyukta Socialist Party	29	3	▼3	152,556	1.69%	▼0.78%
Janata Paksha Party	2	1		14,390	0.16%	
Independents		20	▼21	1,159,383	12.87%	
Total		216				

=== Punjab ===
Result of Punjab Legislative Assembly Election 1972
Party	Seats contested	Seats won	Change in seats	Popular vote	%
Indian National Congress	89	66	▲28	20,83,390	42.84
Shiromani Akali Dal	72	24	▼19	13,44,437	27.64
Communist Party of India	13	10	▲6	3,16,722	6.51
Communist Party of India (Marxist)	17	1	▼1	1,58,309	3.26
Independents	205	3	▼1	5,97,917	12.29
Others	72	0	-	3,62,783	7.47
Total	468	104		48,63,558	

=== Rajasthan ===
Party	Votes	%	Seats	+/–
Indian National Congress	3,976,157	51.13	145	+56
Swatantra Party	958,097	12.32	11	–37
Bharatiya Jana Sangh	948,928	12.20	8	–14
Socialist Party	189,851	2.44	4	New
Communist Party of India	121,591	1.56	4	+3
Indian National Congress (Organisation)	104,398	1.34	1	New
Communist Party of India (Marxist)	74,514	0.96	0	0
Vishal Haryana Party	50,229	0.65	0	New
Republican Party of India	2,137	0.03	0	0
Independents	1,350,012	17.36	11	–5
Total	7,775,914	100.00	184	0
Valid votes	7,775,914	96.77		
Invalid/blank votes	259,313	3.23		
Total votes	8,035,227	100.00		
Registered voters/turnout	13,910,553	57.76		
Source: ECI

=== Tripura ===
Party	Seats contested	Seats won	No. of votes	% of votes	1967 Seats
Bharatiya Jana Sangh	3	0	345	0.07%	0
Communist Party of India	11	1	15,226	3.04%	1
Communist Party of India (Marxist)	57	16	189,667	37.82%	2
Indian National Congress	59	41	224,821	44.83%	27
All India Forward Bloc	9	0	5,739	1.14%	-
Tripura Upajati Juba Samiti	10	0	5,883	1.17%	-
Independents	85	2	59,792	11.92%	0
Total	234	60	501,473		
Source: ECI

=== West Bengal ===
Party	Votes	%	Seats	+/–
Indian National Congress	6,543,251	49.08	216	–
Communist Party of India	1,110,579	8.33	35	–
Communist Party of India (Marxist)	3,659,808	27.45	14	–
Revolutionary Socialist Party	284,643	2.14	3	–
Indian National Congress (Organisation)	196,044	1.47	2	–
All India Gorkha League	35,802	0.27	2	–
Socialist Unity Centre	238,276	1.79	1	–
Indian Union Muslim League	121,208	0.91	1	–
Workers Party of India	63,673	0.48	1	–
Others	605,677	4.54	0	0
Independents	472,556	3.54	5	–
Total	13,331,517	100.00	280	0
Valid votes	13,331,517	97.18		
Invalid/blank votes	387,018	2.82		
Total votes	13,718,535	100.00		
Registered voters/turnout	22,554,545	60.82		
Source: ECI
