= Socialist Party (India, 1971) =

- Chairperson: George Fernandes
- General Secretary: Surendra Mohan
- Governing body: National Committee
- Treasurer: K.G. Maheshwarappa
- Joint Secretaries: Brij Mohan Toofan, Vinod Prasad Singh
- Parliamentary Board chairman: Samar Guha
- Founded: August 9, 1971
- Dissolved: January 23, 1977
- Merger of: Praja Socialist Party, Samyukta Socialist Party, Indian Socialist Party
- Merged into: Janata Party
- Headquarters: 16-17 Vihal Bhai Patel House, Rafi Marg, New Delhi
- Ideology: Socialism

Election symbol
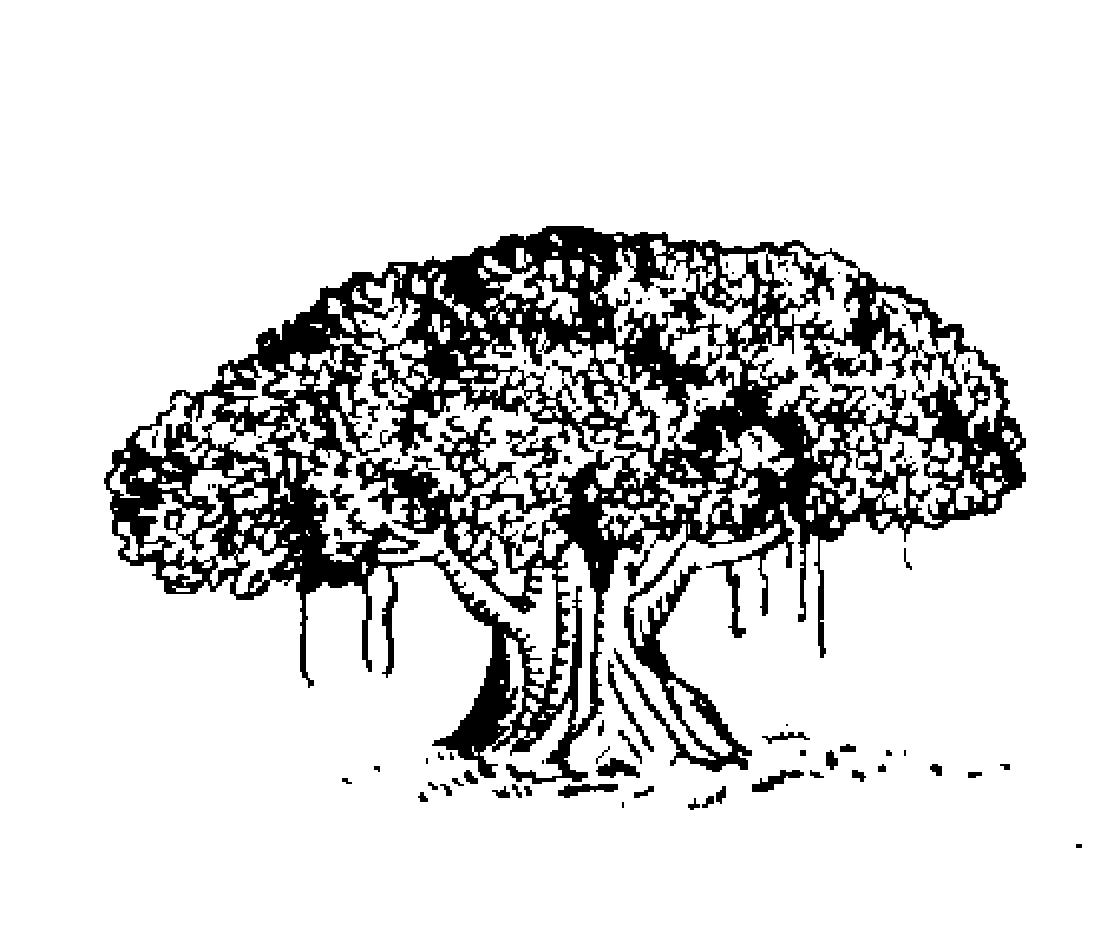

The Socialist Party was a political party in India. It was founded in 1971 through the merger of the Praja Socialist Party (PSP), the Samyukta Socialist Party (SSP) and the Indian Socialist Party. The unification process of PSP and SSP was itself marred by divisions, and in 1972 the party suffered major splits in Northern India. From January 1973 George Fernandes emerged as the leader of the party, and would emerge as a force within the opposition during the Emergency. In 1977 the party merged into the Janata Party.

== Merger process ==
=== 1971 elections and push for PSP-SSP unification ===
The 1971 Indian general election represented a severe setback for both the PSP (obtaining only 2 Lok Sabha seats) and the SSP (obtaining 3 Lok Sabha seats). Whilst the two parties had entered the 1971 elections with very different electoral strategies, the defeat at the polls prompted the leadership of both parties to move towards a reunification of the socialist movement.

In Uttar Pradesh a sizeable section of SSP had rejected the alliance with right-wing parties, a joined the Congress (R) during the 1971 election campaign. After the election SSP leader Salikram Jaiswal and 9 other SSP Members of the Uttar Pradesh Legislative Assembly joined the Congress (R). Reflecting on the election outcome, Chief Minister of Bihar and SSP leader Karpoori Thakur appealed for "the consolidation of Socialist forces" in the country. Former SSP national chairman S. M. Joshi voiced support for unity with PSP.

On March 15, 1971 the PSP general secretary Prem Bhasin stated that the "need for a separate, independent Socialist party was greater than ever now". On March 17, 1971 the PSP National Executive held a meeting at which the party, albeit with some hesitation, gave up its hitherto line of seeking an understanding with the ruling Congress (R).

The SSP National Executive held its first post-election meeting on April 3–4, 1971. The SSP National Executive decided to pull out of the opposition Grand Alliance. At the meeting there was a clash between Madhu Limaye and Raj Narain, with the former called for left unity whilst and the latter opposing such moves. It was decided that a party conference towards the end of the same month would resolve the matter. PSP-SSP unity talks had been scheduled to take place on April 24, 1971 in New Delhi, but the talks were postponed until after extraordinary conference of SSP in Patna in late April 1971. On April 12, 1971 the Maharashtra Executive of PSP held a meeting in Poona, at which it adopted a call for socialist merger and left unity (including the Republican Party of India and the Communist Party of India).

=== ISP and the merger process ===
On April 1, 1971 the chairman of the Indian Socialist Party (ISP), K. Chandrasekharan, speaking in Thiruvanathapuram called for a unity process including the PSP, the SSP, the ISP, PSP splinter groups in Bihar and West Bengal as well as a SSP splinter group in West Bengal. K. Chandrasekharan had attended an August 15–16, 1970 socialist unity conference in Patna convened by the Bihar rebel PSP. Other participants at the August 1970 Patna conference had included A. Halim (secretary of the Uttar Pradesh ISP), Bidyut Basu (chairman of the rebel PSP of West Bengal), Sooraj Narain Singh (chairman of the rebel PSP of Bihar) and Chandrashwar Azad (joint secretary of the rebel PSP of Bihar). The August 1970 Patna conference resolved that a new "dynamic militant socialist party" be formed and elected a 10-member preparatory committee to organize the process.

=== SSP Patna Conference ===
The SSP Special Conference in Patna was finally held on April 28, 1971. At the conference the S.M. Joshi camp (with Madhu Limaye, George Fernandes and Ramand Tiwari) accused Raj Narain of trying to rig elections through use of bogus voters, prompting Joshi and his followers to walk out of the conference in protest. Apart from the issue of electoral fraud accusations, the Joshi camp also called for the party to adopt socialist unity and reject alliances with right-wing parties. The Raj Narain camp on the other hand opposed unification with PSP and wanted to continue the participation of SSP in the governing Samyukta Vidhayak Dal coalition in Bihar.

As of the early May 1971 the Joshi camp managed to gain the upper hand in the battle over the SSP - a credential committee was established (to purge fake voters from the party), Karpoori Thakur agreed to leave the Bihar government, a proposal to substitute the SSP Uttar Pradesh leadership with an ad hoc committee was accepted and the SSP National Committee proposed to seek unity with PSP and ISP. In response to these moves Raj Narain said he would retire from active politics.

=== Draft merger agreement ===
PSP-SSP unity talks resumed on May 25, 1971. On June 4, 1971 George Fernandes, speaking in Bangalore, announced that PSP and SSP had agreed to a merger, and that the two parties had agreed on all issues - including language, caste and price control policies. Moreover Fernandes states that parties like the ISP, the Republican Party of India, the Peasants and Workers Party of India and the minor Kerala socialist parties were invited to join the united party. However, behind closed doors, there were still some tweaks to be worked out on language and caste policies between the leaderships of the two parties. In the drafting of the terms of the merger agreement, all the Lohiaite positions on language policies and backward castes were accepted. The draft merger agreement called for a "radical socialist alternative" to the Congress(R). The draft called for the total replacement of English language by Hindi and the application of strict quota reservation policies for backward castes for education and employment. The SSP did however agree to softening their language policy a bit, as they accepted that non-Hindi states could use English during a transitional period. The draft agreement rejected the participation in united fronts with parties opposed to nationalism, democracy, secularism and socialism. The document called for the implementation of integrated price control policy.

On June 20, 1971 a draft merger agreement was signed in Delhi by both parties. The draft agreement was to be ratified by each party. In response to the June 20, 1971 draft merger agreement, the ISP units in Bihar and Kerala pledged to join the merger process. Splinter groups in Uttar Pradesh and West Bengal also pledged to join the unification process. The SSP Special Convention held at Barahiya on June 27, 1971 overwhelmingly voted to ratify the merger, following a stormy debate that lasted for six hours.

=== West Bengal, Bihar and Kerala coalition governments ===
A major hurdle for the merger was the question of participation in state governments. Per the June 20, 1971 draft merger agreement, socialists should end their participation in state coalition governments in Bihar, Kerala and West Bengal. There were sectors of PSP reluctant to break away from the state governments. The issue of PSP participation in the West Bengal state government was resolved on June 28, 1971, as the cabinet collapsed and President's Rule was imposed in the state.

In Bihar, PSP Lok Sabha parliamentarian Sisir Kumar and 4 PSP Members of the Bihar Legislative Assembly rejected the merger process and refused to heed the call to withdraw support to the Bhola Paswan Shastri state government. On July 15, 1971 they were suspended from PSP chairman N.G. Goray.

Regarding Kerala the PSP National Executive sent Peter Alvares and N.G. Goray to try to convince the state party unit to break with the C. Achutha Menon state government, but the majority in PSP in Kerala opposed the new line. The PSP youth wing in Kerala opposed withdrawing support to the C. Achutha Menon government. On July 18, 1971 the PSP Kerala State Council held a meeting in Cochin, at which a majority voted to endorse that the PSP state government minister N.K. Balakrishnan remain in his post. Thus the majority group of PSP in Kerala broke away from the national party organization. Some 100 PSP workers loyal to the National Executive Committee stormed out of the venue in protest. The NEC loyalists then gathered at a nearby hotel, claiming that they were the legitimate PSP unit in Kerala and they passed a no-confidence resolution against PSP Kerala State Executive chairman Attingal Gopala Pillai. The PSP NEC loyalist group in Kerala was led by P. Viswambharan and N.K. Seshan.

== Formation of the Socialist Party ==
The PSP Special Conference held in Bulandshahr on August 8, 1971 unanimously ratified the merger, removing the last road block for the unification process. On August 9, 1971 the merger of the PSP, SSP and ISP was formalized. The National Ad Hoc Committee of the unified Socialist Party held its first meeting on that day. 55 out of 61 National Ad Hoc Committee members were in attendance. Apart from leaders hailing from PSP, SSP and ISP, there were also leaders of the erstwhile Socialist Party of West Bengal, the Bihar Socialist Party and the Uttar Pradesh Socialist Party represented in the National Ad Hoc Committee. The meeting elected Karpoori Thakur as party chairman and Madhu Dandavate as party general secretary. The National Ad Hoc Committee resolved to continue operating until a new party leadership could be elected in June 1972. At this point the unified Socialist Party claimed a membership of 600,000. The newspaper Janata became the party organ. The Rashtra Seva Dal was the volunteer organisation of the party.

The August 9, 1971 foundation of the new party coincided with the 29th anniversary of the Quit India movement launched by the Congress Socialist Party. Moreover, on the same day as the foundation of the new party, the Indo-Soviet Treaty of Friendship and Cooperation was signed. The newly constituted Socialist Party issued strong criticism of the treaty. The Socialist Party would argue that India should neither depend on aid from the capitalist nor socialist blocs.

Parallel to the PSP Bulandshahr convention and the foundation meeting of the Socialist Party, the dissident wing of PSP led by Sisir Kumar and D. Damodaran Potti organized a meeting of former PSP workers in New Delhi August 8–9, 1971. The meeting the PSP as reconstituted, denouncing the merger with SSP as "betrayal of democratic socialism". On August 14, 1971 Sisir Kumar issued an appeal to PSP to "return" to his faction, arguing the PSP-SSP merger was "unworkable".

Within just 4 days of the merger Raj Narain and 8 others resigned from National Ad Hoc Committee. They criticized N.G. Goray and argued that the merger was an "immoral temporary marriage". He had opposed the merger process but had accepted it due to pressure from the party rank and file. Whilst Raj Narain continued to make critical comments on the merger process, Roma Mitra (editor of Mankind) was more outspoken. She argued that the merger process with PSP was "devoid of a positive, political, social, economic or radical or revolutionary content. Quantitatively the merger was supposed to have ushered in a big party, that too it, i. e . the new united party, has been robbed of. So both from the point of view of quality and quantity, the merger has no meaning. The leaders of the SSP, quarreling and wrangling among themselves, have sinned without pleasure."

On August 27, 1971 the former Orissa state PSP leader Surendranath Dwivedy resigned from the Socialist Party and announced that he was reviving the PSP unit in the state. Dwivedy stated that the policy of "policy of non-cooperation with the other left parties would only help the non-socialist and reactionary forces". After breaking away from the Socialist Party, the Dwivedy-led PSP soon constituted a formal alliance with the Congress(R) against the Swatantra Party-Utkal Congress state government.

In October 1971 the newly-formed Socialist Party underwent its first internal crisis, as conflict broke out over the selection of an ad hoc committee and parliamentary committee for the party in Uttar Pradesh. Eventually the National Ad Hoc Committee of the party managed to reach a unanimous decision on the Uttar Pradesh bodies at its meeting on October 24, 1971.

== 1972 elections ==
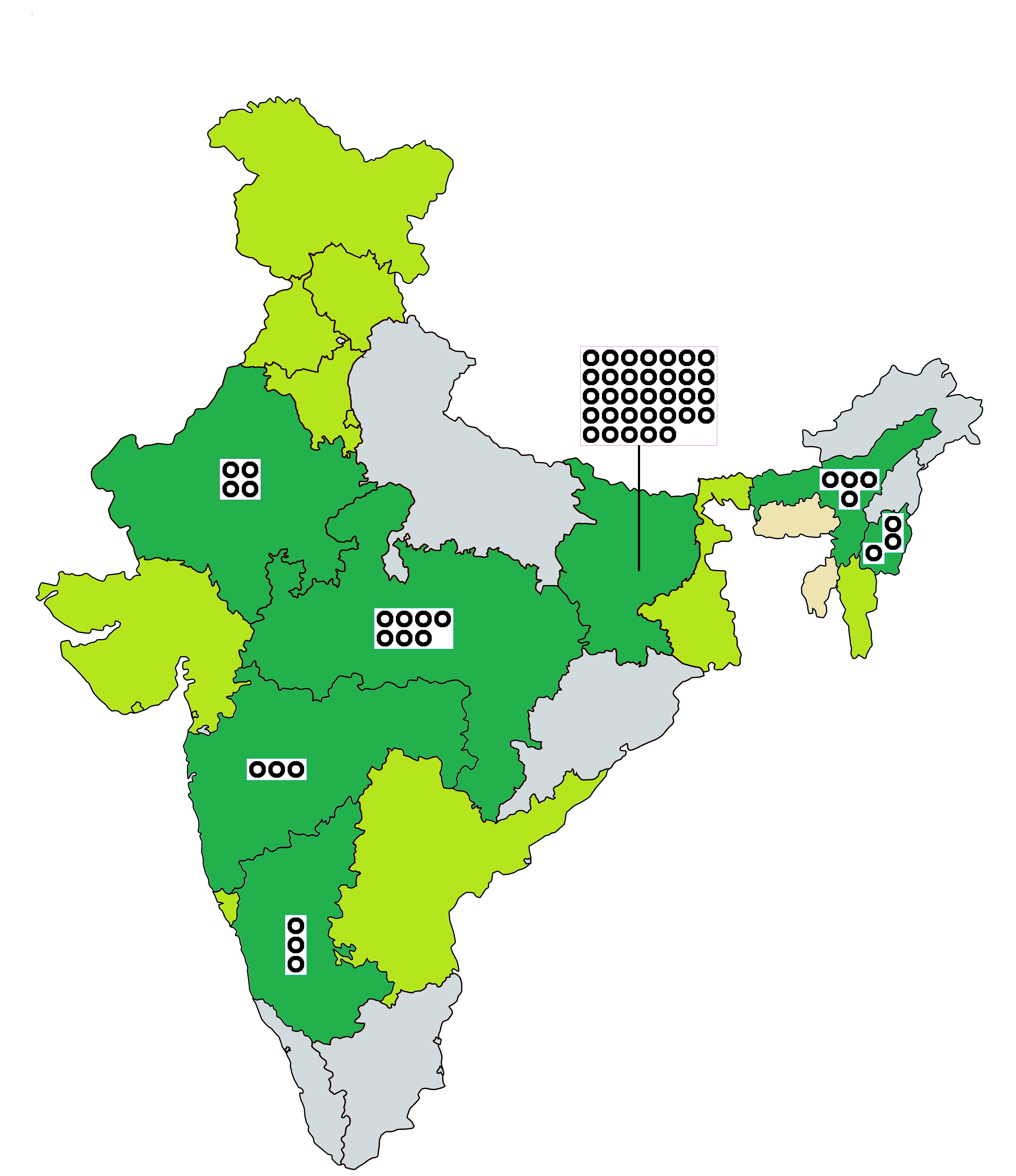
Seats won by the Socialist Party in 1972 assembly elections. Each circle represents one seat.

The party was recognized by the Election Commission of India as a 'National Party'. The party was assigned the 'tree' election symbol. Legislative Assembly elections were held in March 1972 in Andhra Pradesh, Assam, Bihar, Delhi, Goa, Daman and Diu, Gujarat, Haryana, Himachal Pradesh, Jammu and Kashmir, Madhya Pradesh, Maharashtra, Manipur, Meghalaya, Mysore, Punjab, Rajasthan, Tripura and West Bengal, and in April 1972 in Mizoram. The Socialist Party contested all of these elections, except the elections in Meghalaya and Tripura.

By the time of the 1972 Legislative Assembly elections the merger process of the Socialist Party was still partially incomplete, with the Socialist Party policy statement and organizational structure were not finalized. The party issued an election manifesto titled All Power to the People. The party opted to contest the elections without any alliances with other parties. There were only minor arrangements with other parties at constituency level. The manifesto placed emphasis on the housing question, calling for the launch of a large-scale housing program in major cities and encouraging cooperative housing.

The overall tally of seats won by the Socialist Party in the 1972 assembly elections was 57, which can be compared with a combined PSP-SSP tally of 183 assembly seats in the 1967 elections. The Mizoram unit of the Socialist Party, which had been established in 1971, merged with the Congress (R) after the 1972 Legislative Assembly election.

Results of the Socialist Party in the 1972 Legislative Assembly elections
State/UT	SP Candidates	Seats won	Votes	% of state-wide vote	% of votes in seats contested	PSP-SSP candidates in 1967	+/-	Seats won in 1967	+/-	Votes in 1967	+/-	% of state-wide vote in 1967	+/-	References
Andhra Pradesh	4	0	9,952	0.07%	5.08%	11	▼7	1	▼1	78,233	▼68,281	0.57%	▼0.50%	
Assam	38	4	214,342	5.77%	17.47%	52	▼14	9	▼5	314,896	▼100,554	10.14%	▼4.37%	
Bihar	256	33	2,814,799	16.39%	19.59%	381	▼125	86	▼53	3,328,850	▼514,051	24.58%	▼8.19%	
Delhi	11	0	4,293	0.31%	1.31%									
Goa, Daman and Diu	4	0	3,559	1.17%	9.27%	8	▼4	0	±0	3,033	▲526	1.1%	▲0.07%	
Gujarat	15	0	50,009	0.72%	9.11%	51	▼36	3	▼3	235,694	▼185,685	3.7%	▼2.98%	
Haryana	9	0	8,333	0.24%	2.11%	26	▼17	0	±0	114,649	▼106,316	3.78%	▼3.54%	
Himachal Pradesh	2	0	586	0.07%	1.95%	3	▼1	0	±0	962	▼376	0.13%	▼0.06%	
Jammu and Kashmir	3	0	597	0.04%	1.03%	3	±0	0	±0	7,847	▼7,250	0.98%	▼0.94%	
Madhya Pradesh	149	7	679,484	6.24%	12.47%	224	▼75	19	▼12	907,923	▼228,439	9.96%	▼3.72%	
Maharashtra	52	3	693,797	4.58%	23.54%	114	▼62	12	▼9	116,2401	▼468,604	8.69%	▼4.11%	
Manipur	16	3	24,195	5.35%	18.76%	17	▼1	4	▼1	38,937	▼14,742	12.47%	▼7.12%	
Mizoram	18	0	1,713	1.54%	2.53%	no election in 1967								
Mysore	29	3	152,556	1.69%	13.38%	69	▼40	26	▼23	851,884	▼699,328	11.35%	▼9.66%	
Punjab	8	0	44,605	0.92%	11.63%	17	▼9	1	▼1	52,226	▼7,621	1.23%	▼0.31%	
Rajasthan	36	4	189,851	2.44%	11.73%	55	▼19	8	▼4	376,192	▼186,341	5.57%	▼3.13%	
West Bengal	26	0	109,062	0.82%	10.60%	52	▼26	14	▼14	507,928	▼398,866	4.01%	▼3.19%	
Total (Note: SP fielded no candidates in the 1972 Tripura Legislative Assembly election, but in the 1967 Tripura Legislative Assembly election SSP had fielded a single candidate who obtained 83 votes, which is taken into consideration in the comparison between 1972 SP result and 1967 PSP-SSP combined result. In 1967 there were also assembly elections in Kerala, Madras, Orissa and Uttar Pradesh. In those four states the combined PSP and SSP tally of seats in 1967 was 103, obtaining a total of 4,336,867 votes. The seats and votes from those four states are not taking into account for the comparison between SP in 1972 and PSP-SSP in 1967 in this table.)	676	57	5,001,733			1,084	▼418	184	▼126	7,981,738	▼2,984,298			

Socialist Party candidates finished in second place in two Lok Sabha by-elections in 1972 - Ram Sewak Yadav obtained 176,436 votes (39.12%) in Darbhanga and Kalyan Jain obtained 64,356 (42.98%) in Indore. Moreover, the Socialist Party candidate Thangrindema obtained 3,903 votes (3.52%) in the 1972 by-election to the Mizoram Lok Sabha seat.

== Raj Narain and Karpoori Thakur splits ==
In March 1972 Raj Narain decided to contest the Rajya Sabha elections, in direct opposition to decision of the Central Parliamentary Board of the Socialist Party. The Socialist Party had taken a decision prohibiting party members that had been defeated in Lok Sabha or Legislative Assembly elections to run for seats in the Rajya Sabha (upper house of the parliament of India) or Legislative Councils (upper house of some state legislatures). This prohibition stemmed from an internal rule of the erstwhile SSP, which had surged after Raj Narain's previous attempt to run for a seat in the 1966 Rajya Sabha elections. Whilst Raj Narain's candidature was supported by some other parties, he failed to get elected.

The question of the Rajya Sabha election provoked a division within the Uttar Pradesh unit of the party. On April 2, 1972 two meetings were held in Lucknow, one by Raj Narain's supporters and one by his opponents. Raj Narain called for the expulsion of George Fernandes, N.G. Goray, Madhu Limaye and Madhu Dandavate expelled from the party.

A National Ad Hoc Committee meeting April 15–16, 1972 declared Raj Narain suspended from party membership for six month (albeit the party general was tasked with revoking Raj Narain's suspension if the latter expressed regret in writing and commitment to party in accordance with party discipline). On April 17, 1972 Raj Narain organized a meeting at his residence. The April 17, 1972 meeting resolved that the Raj Narain group would operate under the name 'Socialist Party (Lohiawadi)' and that Raj Narain's residence would function as the party headquarters. In Bihar the leader of the Raj Narain group was Bhola Prasad Singh.

On May 18, 1972 Karpoori Thakur announced the formation of a new party at Bihar state level, the 'Socialist Party (Samtawadi-Ektawadi)' which would pursue "basic policies and programmes formulated by Dr. Lohia". Karpoori Thakur claimed the support of 16 Members of the Legislative Assembly in Bihar. He stated that he wanted to mediate between the Socialist Party and Raj Narain for the sake of restoring socialist unity. In a separate move, Kishen Patnaik, Om Prakash Deepak and Roma Mitra presented a plan in New Delhi on May 21, 1972 calling for the formation of a new party "to save the Indian socialist movement from disintegration".

Karpoori Thakur would later retract his ambitions to build a separate party in Bihar. The Socialist Party leadershop would also begin to express regret regarding the suspension of Raj Narain.

A meeting between the Karpoori Thakur group and the Socialist Party was held in Patna on September 12, 1972. The Socialist Party was represented by its general secretary Madhu Dandavate at the meeting. In Patna the Madhu Dandavate and the Karpoori Thakur signed an agreement on a formula for party reunification - the disbanding of the parallel party bodies created by Raj Narain, impartial scrutiny of party membership to ensure proper representation at a national party conference and creating a commission to articulate party policy based on the inputs of the membership. The agreement stipulated that in case the efforts for reunification with the Raj Narain would fail, Karpoori Thakur and other unaffiliated socialists would return to the Socialist Party.

On October 6–7, 1972 the Raj Narain group held a meeting in Varanasi, at which Karpoori Thakur discussed the terms of the September 12, 1972 unity formula with them. Karpoori Thakur failed to convince Raj Narain to go along with the September 12, 1972 unity formula. Raj Narain insisted on his own conditions for socialist unity. The October 6–7, 1972 meeting adopted a resolution calling for unity of socialists, including socialists from parties like the Congress (O) and the Bharatiya Kranti Dal.

In reaction to Raj Narain's position, the Socialist Party National Ad Hoc Committee withdrew from the reunification talks. Madhu Dandavate stated that no decision of reunification could be taken as long as Raj Narain did not dissolve his party and cease with his attacks on the Socialist Party.

Contrary to the agreement of September 12, 1972, Karpoori Thakur and his faction did not rejoin the Socialist Party after Raj Narain's rejection of the unity formula. Instead Karpoori Thakur organized a conference of unattached socialists in Patna on December 15–18, 1972. The Patna conference called on socialists to unite to oppose the "growing dictatorial tendencies of the Indira government and to provide an effective alternative to it". But on December 17, 1972 Raj Narain and his followers at the Patna conference prevailed in rejecting a compromise path for reconciliation with the Socialist Party and unification a single party. The Patna conference marked the merger of the Karpoori Thakur group and the Raj Narain group. The party emerging from the merger of the Karpoori Thakur and Raj Narain groups took the name Samyukta Socialist Party.

The 1972 splits significantly weakened the Socialist Party, which had already suffered minor splits in Kerala, Orissa and Gujarat in the immediate wake of the 1971 merger. The Karpoori Thakur-Raj Narain split took with them the bulk of the party unit in Uttar Pradesh, about half of the Bihar party unit and smaller groups in Madhya Pradesh and Haryana. The Karpoori Thakur-Raj Narain group emerged largely from the old SSP membership. In terms of the strength in state legislatures, 50 out of 83 Socialist Party legislators sided with the Karpoori Thakur-Raj Narain group in the split (all 34 legislators in Bihar and 16 legislators in Uttar Pradesh). Remaining in the Socialist Party fold under Madhu Dandavate's leadership were the 4 legislators in Assam, 8 in Kerala, 7 in Madhya Pradesh, 3 in Maharashtra, 3 in Manipur, 3 in Mysore and 1 in Uttar Pradesh.

== 1973 Party Conference ==
The Socialist Party held its first national conference in Bulandshahr January 5–8, 1973. More than 2,000 delegates attended the event. The conference would approve the party constitution. A new party leadership was elected, with George Fernandes being elected party chairman, Surendra Mohan elected as party general secretary, Samar Guha as the parliamentary party leader, K.G. Maheshwarappa as the party treasurer and Brij Mohan Toofan and Vinod Prasad Singh as Joint Secretaries. At the conference George Fernandes held a 90-minute presidential address, denouncing the Congress(R), Indira Gandhi and the English-speaking elites in India as the enemies of democracy. The party conference rejected reconciliation with the Karpoori Thakur-Raj Narain group.

The conference elected a National Committee, consisting of George Fernandes (chairman), Surendra Mohan, Madhu Dandavate, Ramanand Tiwary, H.V. Kamath, Peter Alvares, Prem Bhasin, Golap Borbora, Samarendra Kundu, Lakhanlal Kapoor, Basawon Sinha, Ugra Sen, Premlata Rai, Chandrabali Singh, P. Viswambharan, Ramachandra Rao, Saraswathy Ammal, Yamuna Prasad Shastri, Samar Guha, Naren Das, Nihal Ahmed, Kishore Pawar, Brij Mohan Toofan, Borthakur Sharma, Deven Sarkar, Harbhajan Singh, Beni Prasad Madhav, O.N. Durai Babu, Dhanraj Bargotra, Rusi Contractor and K.G. Maheswarappa.

A Parliamentary Board was elected, chaired by Prem Bhasin and with Chandradeo Prasad Verma as its secretary. Other members of the Parliamentary Board were M.P. Veerendra Kumar, Rajwant Singh, Basawon Sinha, Ramanand Singh, Abbas Ali, Ram Sundar Das, K. Chandrasekharan and Hariprasad Mazumder. A National Disciplinary Committee was elected, consisting of N.G. Goray, Basant Chandra Ghose and Harbans Sahai.

== 1973 Banka by-elections and 1974-1975 assembly elections ==
In April 1973 Madhu Limaye won a seat in the Lok Sabha, in a by-election in Banka. Raj Narain was one of the opponents running against Limaye in the by-election.

The Socialist Party contested three state legislative assembly elections held in February 1974, in Manipur, Orissa and Uttar Pradesh.

Election	Candidates	Seats won	Votes	% of state-wide vote	MLAs elected
1974 Manipur Legislative Assembly election	18	2	35,349	5.93%	Kongbrailakpam Borthakur Sharma (Khurai), Hawaibam Shyama Singh (Thongju)
1974 Orissa Legislative Assembly election	17	2	101,789	1.77%	Gadadhar Giri (Jaleswar), Bhagabat Behera (Nayagarh)
1974 Uttar Pradesh Legislative Assembly election	226	5	795,770	2.90%	Yamuna Prasad Bose (Banda), Ram Pal Singh Yadav (Derapur), Shivnath Singh Kushwaha (Ghatampur), Hari Kewal Prasad (Salempur, Janardan Prasad Ojha (Shyam Deurwa)

== Emergency ==
The Socialist Party was active in the JP movement in Bihar. George Fernandes endorsed Jayaprakash Narayan's demand for the resignation of the Abdul Ghafoor government in Bihar. Moreover Fernandes demanded the dissolution of the parliament of India and the creation of a Constituent Assembly to draft a new constitution for the country. Fernandes, who was also the president of the All India Railwaymen's Federation, was arrested in Lucknow on May 1, 1974. Fernandes' arrest sparked the 1974 railway strike.

The Socialist Party developed its own form of satyagrah, the 'Jan-Jagruti Yatra', whereby senior leaders travelled from town to town holding meetings. The experience of the JP movement in Bihar brought the Socialist Party closer to other opposition parties. In 1974 a Madhya Pradesh Legislative Assembly by-election in Bhopal brought the Socialist Party, the Jan Sangh and the Congress (O) together behind a common candidate - Babulal Gaur who contested under the label 'Janata' ('People'). Gaur won the election, obtaining some 13,000 votes more than the Congress (R) candidate. Shortly thereafter the Socialist Party, Jan Sangh, Congress (O) and the Bharatiya Lok Dal fielded a common candidate in the Jabalpur Lok Sabha seat by-election - the socialist Sharad Yadav won the election by a wide margin.

At the Second National Conference of the Socialist Party, held in Kozhikode December 28–29, 1974 George Fernandes call for mobilization popular movements to oust the Congress government. In his speech Fernandes emphasised the need of reform of electoral legislation. The resolution adopted by the conference stated that "We socialists must pledge our support to strengthen J.P.'s movement and make it a vehicle for much delayed social and economic transformation of society. [...] We are now convinced that if we can spread the Bihar and Gujarat model of agitation to all parts of the country a radical and viable alternative will emerge out of the struggle." The Kozhikode conference called for "[t]he removal of the Congress Government from the centre, the breaking up the stranglehold of money-power over the electoral process, and a purge of the administrative machinery alone can restore the disturbed balance within the Executive branch, and between it and the Legislature and the Judiciary. Since the capacity of the parliamentary system to achieve reform and renewal from within is getting severely limited, extra-constitutional action and popular initiative become absolutely necessary. This is not subversion but replenishment of the springs of democracy".

On April 7, 1975 Morarji Desai of Congress (O) undertook a hunger strike to demand the holding of elections in Gujarat. A few days later, on April 13, 1975 Indira Gandhi decided to hold elections there on June 13, 1975. Soon after the announcement of the elections, a coalition named the Janata Front was formed between the Socialist Party, Jan Sangh, Congress (O) and BLD. The Socialist Party fielded three candidates in the election, out of whom two were elected - Acharya Rasikchandra Devshanker (Una) and G.G. Paradkar (Sayajigunj).

Many Socialist Party workers were jailed during the Emergency. For example, Christophe Jaffrelot recorded that 207 Socialist Party workers from Maharashtra were jailed, as were 33 from Assam, 8 from Karnataka and 6 from Punjab (with statistics unavailable for other states). Samar Guha and Madhu Dandavate were jailed at Rohtak Jail, whilst Surendra Mohan was jailed at Tihar Jail. Socialist leaders Raghu Thakur and Sharad Yadav were jailed in Indore Jail. The Socialist Party newspaper Janata published appeals for contributions to the Political Prisons Family Relief Fund, based in Poona.

== Merger into Janata Party ==
Among jailed politicians the idea of a unification of opposition parties gradually gathered momentum. In 1976 BLD leader Charan Singh, in Tihar Jail, relaunched the proposition of amalgamating opposition parties into a single political party. Charan Singh managed to get support from other inmates for the idea. In February 1976 Surendra Mohan proposed, during discussions in Tihar Jail, that the Rashtriya Swayamsevak Sangh (RSS), the Congress Seva Dal of Congress (O) and the Rashtriya Seva Dal be merged into a single volunteer organization. When Jayaprakash Narayan was released from jail due to health issues, he gathered the interim presidents of the four parties (Socialist Party, Jan Sangh, Congress (O) and BLD) for talks. Charan Singh was released from jail in March 1976, after which he continued to advocate for a party merger. Charan Singh's proposition led to the articulation of a May 1976 formula for dissolving existing parties to pave way for a new united opposition party.

On January 22, 1977 the National Committee of the Socialist Party endorsed the merger into the Janata Party ahead of the 1977 Lok Sabha election. The Janata Party was founded the next day, at Babulal Gaur's residence in Bhopal - through the merger of the Socialist Party, Congress (O), Jan Sangh and BLD. Each party was represented in the ad hoc committee of the Janata Party. The Janata Party won a landslide victory in the 1977 election. Janata Party candidates coming from the Socialist Party won 51 seats in the Lok Sabha. Fernandes was named Minister of Industries in the new national government.
