= Neog =

Neog (Assamese: নেওগ) is a surname of Assamese origin.

People with this surname include:

- Ajanta Neog, Indian politician
- Dimbeswar Neog, Indian writer and poet
- Maheshwar Neog, Indian academic
- Nagen Neog, Indian politician

NEOG can also refer to:

- North East Olympic Games, a sports event held in Northeast India
