= Atuwa Munda =

Indian politician

Minister for the Environment, Forest and Tea Tribe Welfare
- In office 22 January 2015 – 24 May 2016
- Chief Minister: Tarun Gogoi

Minister of state, Public Works Department
- In office 7 June 2002 – 21 May 2006
- Chief Minister: Tarun Gogoi

Member of Assam Legislative Assembly
- In office 13 May 2011 - 19 May 2016
- Preceded by: Anup Phukan
- Succeeded by: Bimal Bora
- Constituency: Tingkhong
- In office 12 June 1996 - 19 May 2006
- Preceded by: Prithibi Majhi
- Succeeded by: Anup Phukan
- Constituency: Tingkhong

Personal details
- Party: Indian National Congress (1996-present)
- Parent: Bhayaram Munda (Father)
- Education: Dibrugarh University
- Occupation: Politician

Atuwa Munda (born c. 1961) is an Indian politician from the state of Assam. He has been the Indian National Congress candidate for Tingkhong consecutively since 1996, winning three times. He has been a minister in the first and third Tarun Gogoi Ministry.

== Early life and education ==
Atuwa Munda is the son of Late Bhayaram Munda. He is an Arts graduate from Dibrugarh University, 1987 batch.

== Political career ==
Munda was the Indian National Congress candidate for the constituency of Tingkhong in 1996. He received 28910 votes, 44.86% of the vote and became MLA of the constituency. He defeated his nearest opponent, AGP candidate Anup Phukan, by 1957 votes.

Munda was reelected as the Indian National Congress candidate in Tingkhong in 2001. He received 31743 votes, 45.37% of the total vote. He defeated his nearest opponent by 404 votes. On 7 June 2002, in an expansion of the Gogoi ministry, he became a minister of state for Planning and Works Department. He remained a minister of state until the formation of the Second Tarun Gogoi Ministry.

Munda lost the 2006 Assam Legislative Assembly election, receiving 41852 votes and losing to AGP candidate, Anup Phukan, by 5342 votes.

In the 2011 Assam Legislative Assembly Election, Munda again became the Congress candidate for Tingkhong. He received 41839 votes, 48.96% of the total vote. He defeated Phukan by 15524 votes. On 22 January 2015, after a cabinet reshuffle, Munda again became a minister in the third Tarun Gogoi cabinet. He was made minister for environment, forest and Tea Tribe Welfare. He served until the 2016 Assam Legislative Assembly election.

In the 2016 Assam Legislative Assembly election, Munda sought reelection. He received 38734 votes, 37.07% of the total vote. He lost to BJP candidate, Bimal Bora, by 18338 votes.

In the 2021 Assam Legislative Assembly Election, Munda was again the congress candidate for Tingkhong. He received 34281 votes, 28.8% of the total vote. He again lost to Bora by 28394 votes.

Munda also served as the President of Congress committee of the Dibrugarh district.

== Personal life ==
He resides in Halmira Tea state, Khowang in Dibrugarh district. His wife is a member of Zila Parishad.
