= 1972 Bihar Legislative Assembly election =

State election in India

1972 Bihar legislative assembly election
- 5 March 1972

All 318 seats to the Bihar Legislative Assembly 160 seats needed for a majority
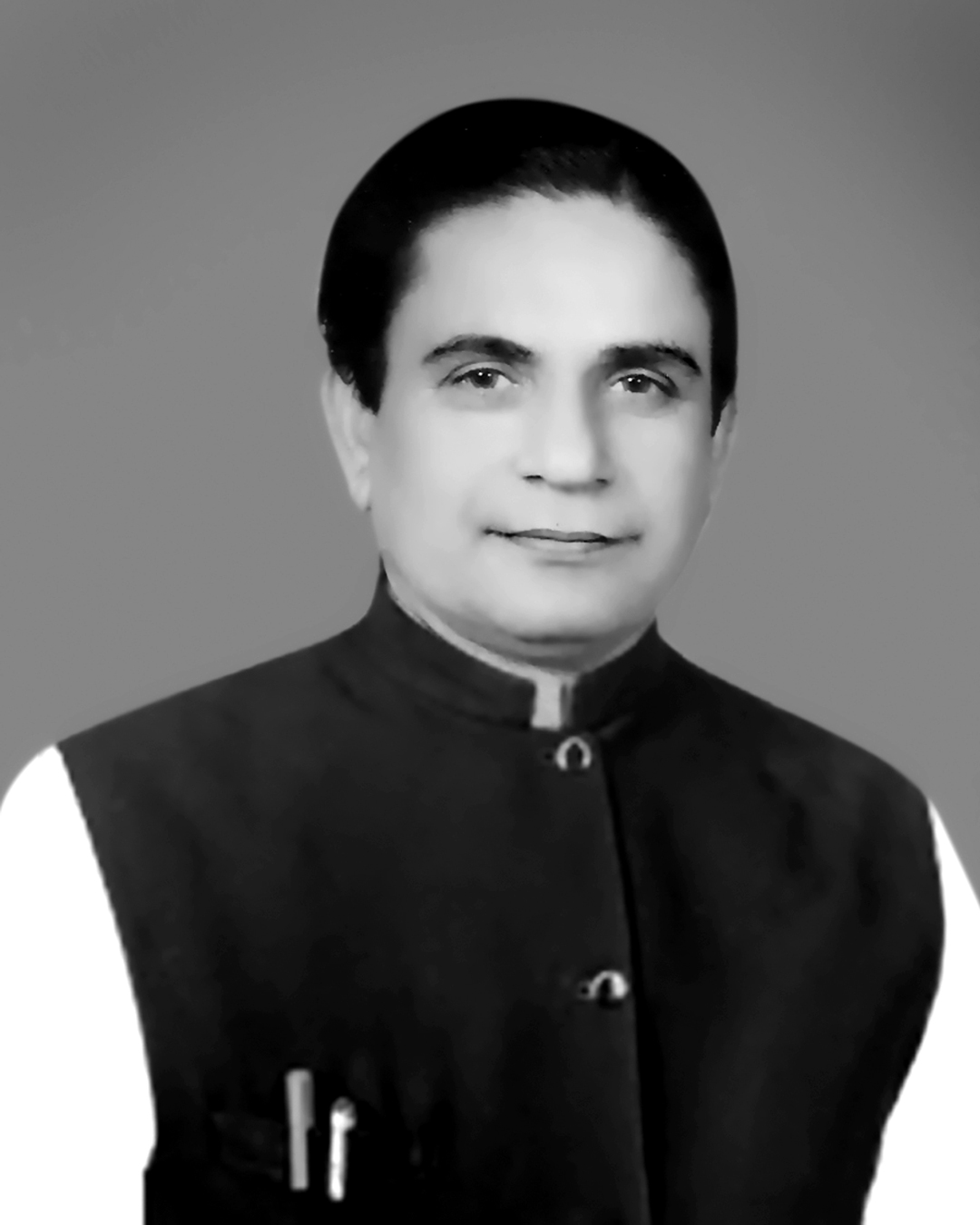
	Majority party	Minority party
		CPI
Leader	Kedar Pandey	Shrinath Mishra
Party	INC(R)	CPI
Seats won	167	35
Popular vote	5,688,002	1,192,746
Percentage	33.12	6.94
CM before election
President's rule
N/A
Elected CM
Kedar Pandey
INC

Legislative Assembly elections were held in March 1972, to elect members to the Bihar Legislative Assembly. After the elections, the Congress emerged as the largest party, and Kedar Pandey was sworn in as the Chief Minister of Bihar. Later, Abdul Gafoor become the Chief Minister, from 2 July 1973 to 11 April 1975, followed by Jagannath Mishra from 11 April 1975 to 30 April 1977.

== Party-wise performance ==
Party	Votes	%	Seats
Indian National Congress	5,688,002	33.12	167
Socialist Party (India, 1971)	2,814,799	16.39	33
Indian National Congress (O)	2,544,841	14.82	30
Bharatiya Jan Sangh	2,007,314	11.69	25
Communist Party of India	1,192,746	6.94	35
Communist Party of India (Marxist)	276,649	1.61	–
Hindustani Shoshit Dal	219,341	1.28	3
Swatantra Party	121,238	0.71	1
All India Jharkhand Party	149,754	0.87	3
Jharkhand	90,717	0.53	1
Bihar Prant Hul Jharkhand	90,234	0.53	2
Socialist Unity Centre of India	47,732	0.28	–
Progressive Hull Jharkhand Party (Shibu Group)	32,631	0.19	1
All India Forward Bloc	20,525	0.12	–
Bharatiya Kranti Dal	5,609	0.03	–
Indian Union Muslim League	5,317	0.03	–
Revolutionary Socialist Party (India)	4,677	0.03	–
Backward Classes Party of India	4,386	0.03	–
All India Labour Party	3,859	0.02	–
Revolutionary Socialist Party of India (Marxist-Leninist)	2,968	0.02	–
Chota Nagpur Bhumi Rakshak Party	1,274	0.01	–
Republican Party of India	907	0.01	–
Independent	1,849,613	10.77	17
Total	17,175,133	100.00	318
Valid votes	17,175,133	98.09	
Invalid/blank votes	333,560	1.91	
Total votes	17,508,693	100.00	
Registered voters/turnout	33,164,286	52.79	

== Elected members ==
#	Constituency	Reserved for (SC/ST/None)	Member	Party
1	Dhanaha	None	Hardeo Prasad	Indian National Congress
2	Bagaha	SC	Narsingh Baitha	Indian National Congress
3	Ram Nagar	None	Narayan Vikram Shah	Indian National Congress
4	Shikarpur	SC	Sitaram Prasad	Indian National Congress
5	Sikta	None	Faiyajulazam	Indian National Congress
6	Lauria	None	Fulena Rao	Indian National Congress
7	Chanapatia	None	Umesh Prasad Verma	Indian National Congress
8	Bettiah	None	Kirshna Mohan Pandey	Indian National Congress
9	Nautan	None	Kedar Pandey	Indian National Congress
10	Raxaul	None	Saghir Ahmad	Indian National Congress
11	Sugauli	None	Azizul Haque	Socialist Party
12	Motihari	None	Prabhawati Gupta	Indian National Congress
13	Adapur	None	Ramprit Rai	Indian National Congress
14	Ghorasahan	None	Rajendra Pratap Singh	Indian National Congress
15	Dhaka	None	Hafiz Idris Ansari	Indian National Congress
16	Patahi	None	Thakur Rama Pati Singh	Socialist Party
17	Madhuban	None	Rajpati Devi	Communist Party of India
18	Kesaria	None	Pitambar Singh	Communist Party of India
19	Pipra	SC	Tulsi Ram	Communist Party of India
20	Harsidhi	None	Mahedayetulla Khan	Indian National Congress
21	Gobindganj	None	Ramashankar Pandey	Indian National Congress
22	Gopal Ganj	None	Ram Dulari Sinh	Indian National Congress
23	Kuchaikot	None	Nagina Rai	Indian National Congress
24	Katea	SC	Algu Ram	Indian National Congress
25	Bhore	None	Raj Mangal Mishra	Indian National Congress
26	Mirganj	None	Anant Pd. Singh	Indian National Congress
27	Siwan	None	Janardan Tiwary	Bharatiya Jana Sangh
28	Ziradei	None	Sankarnath Vidyarthi	Independent
29	Mairwa	SC	Ram Narain	Indian National Congress
30	Darauli	None	Krishna Pratap Singh	Bharatiya Jana Sangh
31	Raghunathpur	None	Shreenivas N. Singh	Indian National Congress
32	Maharajganj	None	Anusuya Devi	Indian National Congress
33	Barharia	None	Abdul Jalil	Communist Party of India
34	Goreakothi	None	Mahamaya Prasad	Indian National Congress
35	Baikunthpur	None	Sabhapati Singh	Socialist Party
36	Barauli	None	Brajakishore Narain Singh	Indian National Congress
37	Manjhi	None	Ram Bahadur Singh	Socialist Party
38	Baniapur	None	Uma Pandey	Indian National Congress
39	Masrakh	None	Ram Deo Singh	Indian National Congress
40	Taraiya	None	Prabhu Nath Singh	Indian National Congress
41	Marhaura	None	Bhishm Prasad Yadav	Indian National Congress
42	Jalalpur	None	Kumar Kalika Singh	Indian National Congress
43	Chapra	None	Janak Yadav	Indian National Congress
44	Garkha	SC	Raghunandan Majhi	Indian National Congress
45	Parsa	None	Daroga Prasad Roy	Indian National Congress
46	Sonepur	None	Ram Jaipal Singh Yadav	Indian National Congress
47	Hajipur	None	Motilal Sinha Kanan	Socialist Party
48	Raghopur	None	Babu Lal Shastri	Socialist Party
49	Mahnar	None	Munishwar Prasad Singh	Socialist Party
50	Jandaha	None	Bhagdeo Singh	Independent
51	Patepur	SC	Righan Ram	Communist Party of India
52	Goraul	None	Samayelenabi	Indian National Congress
53	Vaishali	None	Laliteshwar Pd. Sahi	Indian National Congress
54	Lalganj	None	Dipnarain Singh	Indian National Congress
55	Paru	None	Birendra Kumar Singh	Indian National Congress
56	Sahebganj	None	Sheo Sharan Singh	Indian National Congress
57	Baruraj	None	Jamuna Singh	Socialist Party
58	Kanti	None	Shambhu Sharan Thakur	Indian National Congress
59	Kurhani	None	Sadhu Saran Sahi	Socialist Party
60	Sakra	SC	Hiralall Paswan	Socialist Party
61	Muzaffarpur	None	Ramdeva Sharma	Communist Party of India
62	Bochaha	SC	Ramai Ram	Hindustani Shoshit Dal
63	Gaighatti	None	Niteshwar Prasad Sinha	Indian National Congress
64	Aurai	None	Ram Babu Singh	Indian National Congress
65	Minapur	None	Mahanth Ramkishore Das	Indian National Congress
66	Runisaidpur	None	Tribeni Prasad Singh	Indian National Congress
67	Sitamarhi	None	Ram Swarup Singh	Communist Party of India
68	Bathnaha	None	Paturi Singh	Indian National Congress
69	Belsand	None	Ram Surat Singh	Indian National Congress
70	Sheohar	None	Raghunath Jha	Indian National Congress
71	Majorganj	SC	Surendra Ram	Indian National Congress
72	Sonbarsa	None	Sita Ram Mahto	Socialist Party
73	Sursand	None	Ram Charitra Rai Yadav	Indian National Congress
74	Pupri	None	Ram Briksh Choudhery	Indian National Congress
75	Benipatti	None	Tej Narayan Jha	Communist Party of India
76	Bisfi	None	Aziz Nuruddin	Indian National Congress
77	Harlakmi	None	Shakur Ahmad	Indian National Congress
78	Khajauli	None	Mahendra Narayan Jha	Indian National Congress
79	Jai Nagar	SC	Ramphal Paswan	Indian National Congress
80	Madhubani	None	Surya Narayan Singh	Socialist Party
81	Jhanjharpur	None	Jagannath Mishra	Indian National Congress
82	Rajnagar	SC	Bilat Paswan	Indian National Congress
83	Phulparas	None	Uttam Lal Yadav	Socialist Party
84	Laukaha	None	Dhaniklal Mandal	Socialist Party
85	Madhepur	None	Radha Nandan Jha	Indian National Congress
86	Biraul	None	Anirudh Jha	Bharatiya Jana Sangh
87	Baheri	None	Tej Narayan Yadav	Swatantra Party
88	Manigachhi	None	Nagendra Jha	Indian National Congress
89	Benipur	None	Hari Nath Mishra	Indian National Congress
90	Darbhanga	None	Surendra Jha Suman	Bharatiya Jana Sangh
91	Keotiranway	None	Hukmdev Narayan Yadav	Socialist Party
92	Jale	None	Khadim Hussain	Communist Party of India
93	Hayagaht	SC	Baleshvar Ram	Indian National Congress
94	Kalyanpur	None	Ram Naresh Trivedi	Indian National Congress
95	Warisnagar	SC	Chulhai Ram	Indian National Congress
96	Samastipur	None	Sahdeo Mahato	Indian National Congress
97	Tajpur	None	Karpoori Thakur	Socialist Party
98	Mohiuddinnagar	None	Kapildoo Narain Singh	Indian National Congress
99	Dalsinghsarai	None	Jagdish Pd. Choudhary	Indian National Congress
100	Sarairanjan	None	Chandreshwar Prasad	Bharatiya Jana Sangh
101	Bibhutpur	None	Bandhu Mahato	Indian National Congress
102	Rosera	None	Ramashrey Rai	Bharatiya Jana Sangh
103	Hassanpur	None	Gajendra Pd. Himanshu	Socialist Party
104	Singhia	SC	Ramjatan Paswan	Communist Party of India
105	Raghopur	None	Amrenisa Mishra	Indian National Congress
106	Kishanpur	None	Vinayak Pd. Yadav	Socialist Party
107	Supaul	None	Uma Shankar Singh	Indian National Congress
108	Tribeniganj	None	Anup Lal Yadab	Socialist Party
109	Chhatarur	SC	Kumbh N. Sardar	Indian National Congress
110	Kumarkhand	None	Jai Kumar Singh	Socialist Party
111	Simri Bakhtiarpor	None	Chaudhary Md. Salahuddin	Indian National Congress
112	Mahishi	None	Lahtan Chadhary	Indian National Congress
113	Saharsa	None	Ramesh Jha	Indian National Congress
114	Sonabarsa	SC	Jageshwar Hazra	Socialist Party
115	Madmipura	None	Bindeshwari Pd. Mandal	Socialist Party
116	Murliganj	None	Raj Nandau Prasad	Bharatiya Jana Sangh
117	Alamnagar	None	Vidyakar Kavi	Indian National Congress
118	Rupauli	None	Anandi Prasad Singh	Indian National Congress
119	Dhamdaha	None	Jai Narayan Mehta	Indian National Congress
120	Banmankhi	SC	Rasik Lal Rishideo	Indian National Congress
121	Kasba	None	Ram Naraian Mandal	Indian National Congress
122	Raniganj	SC	Bundel Paswan	Independent
123	Narpatganj	None	Satya Narayan Yadav	Indian National Congress
124	Forbesganj	None	Saryu Mishra	Indian National Congress
125	Araria	None	Azam	Socialist Party
126	Palasi	None	Maya Nand Thakur	Indian National Congress
127	Bahadurganj	None	Najmuddin	Indian National Congress
128	Thakurganj	None	Mohammad Hussain Azad	Indian National Congress
129	Kishanganj	None	Rafique Alam	Indian National Congress
130	Jokihat	None	Taslinuddin	Independent
131	Amour	None	Hasibur Rahman	Independent
132	Purnea	None	Kamaldeo N. Sinha	Indian National Congress
133	Katihar	None	Rajkishor Prasad Singh	Communist Party of India
134	Barso	None	Beula Doza	Indian National Congress
135	Azamnagar	None	Mohmad Ayub	Indian National Congress
136	Korha	SC	Bhola Paswan Shastry	Indian National Congress
137	Barari	None	Muhamad Sakoor	Indian National Congress
138	Manihari	None	Yuvraj	Socialist Party
139	Rajmahal	None	Nathmal Dokania	Indian National Congress
140	Borio	ST	Set Hemram	Bihar Prant Hul Jharkhand
141	Barhait	ST	Masih Soren	Independent
142	Litipara	ST	Som Murmu	Bihar Prant Hul Jharkhand
143	Pakpura	None	S. M. Jafar Ali	Indian National Congress
144	Maheshpur	ST	Kalidas Murmu	Indian National Congress
145	Shikaripara	ST	Shibu Murmu	Progressive Hul Jharkhand Party
146	Nala	None	Biseshwar Khan	Communist Party of India
147	Jamtara	None	Durga Prasad Singh	Indian National Congress
148	Sarath	None	Kamdeo Pro Singh	Indian National Congress
149	Madhupur	None	Ajit Kumar Banerjee	Bharatiya Jana Sangh
150	Deoghar	SC	Baidya Nath Das	Indian National Congress
151	Jarmundi	None	Srikant Jha	Indian National Congress
152	Dumka	ST	Paika Murmu	Indian National Congress
153	Jama	ST	Mauan Besra	Indian National Congress
154	Poraiyahat	ST	Prithwi Chand Kisku	Indian National Congress
155	Godda	None	Hemantkumar Jha	Indian National Congress
156	Mahagama	None	Awadh Bihari Singh	Bharatiya Jana Sangh
157	Pirpainti	None	Amvika Praasad	Communist Party of India
158	Colgong	None	Sadanand Singh	Indian National Congress
159	Nathnagar	None	Chunchun Prasad Yadav	Indian National Congress
160	Bhagalpur	None	Vijoy Kumar Mitra	Bharatiya Jana Sangh
161	Gopalpur	None	Madan Prasad Singh	Indian National Congress
162	Bimpur	None	Prabhu Narayan Roy	Communist Party of India
163	Sultanganj	None	Ram Raksha Pd. Yadav	Indian National Congress
164	Amarpur	None	Janar Dan Yadav	Bharatiya Jana Sangh
165	Dhuraiya	SC	Naresh Das	Communist Party of India
166	Banka	None	Thakur Kamakhya Pd. Singh	Indian National Congress
167	Belhar	None	Shakuntala Devi	Indian National Congress
168	Katoria	None	Jay Prakash Mishra	Independent
169	Chakai	None	Chaudra Shakar Singh	Indian National Congress
170	Jhajha	None	Shiva Nandan Jha	Socialist Party
171	Jamui	None	Tripurari Prasad Singh	Socialist Party
172	Sikandra	SC	Rameswar Paswan	Indian National Congress
173	Sheikhpura	SC	Loknath Azad	Communist Party of India
174	Barbigha	None	Rajo Singh	Independent
175	Barahiya	None	Kapil Deo Singh	Socialist Party
176	Surajgarha	None	Sunaina Sharma	Communist Party of India
177	Jamalpur	None	Suresh Kumar Singh	Bharatiya Jana Sangh
178	Tarapur	None	Tarni Prasad Singh	Indian National Congress
179	Kharagpur	None	Rajendra Prasad Singh	Indian National Congress
180	Monghyr	None	Prafulla Kumar Mishra	Indian National Congress
181	Parbatta	None	Shivakant Mishra	Indian National Congress
182	Chautham	None	Ghanshyam Singh	Indian National Congress
183	Alauli	SC	Mishri Sada	Indian National Congress
184	Khagaria	None	Ram Sharan Yadav	Bharatiya Jana Sangh
185	Balia	None	Chandra Choor Deo	Bharatiya Jana Sangh
186	Begusarai	None	Bhola Singh	Communist Party of India
187	Bakhri	SC	Ram Chandra Paswan	Communist Party of India
188	Bariarpur	None	Ram Jiwan Singh	Socialist Party
189	Barauni	None	Chandra Sekhar Singh	Communist Party of India
190	Bachhwara	None	Ramdeo Rai	Indian National Congress
191	Mokameh	None	Krishna Shahi	Indian National Congress
192	Barh	None	Dwarika Nath Singh	Indian National Congress
193	Bakhtiarpur	None	Bhola Prasad Singh	Socialist Party
194	Fatwa	SC	Kameshwar Paswan	Bharatiya Jana Sangh
195	Bihar	None	Virendra Prasad	Bharatiya Jana Sangh
196	Asthawan	None	Ayodhya Prasad	Indian National Congress
197	Ekangar Sarai	None	Ram Swaroop Prasad	Bharatiya Jana Sangh
198	Rajgir	SC	Chandradeo Prasad Himansu	Communist Party of India
199	Islampur	None	Ramsharan Prasad Singh	Independent
200	Chandi	None	Ram Raj Prasad Singh	Indian National Congress
201	Milsa	None	Nawal Kishore Singh	Indian National Congress
202	Masaurhi	None	Bhuwaneshwar Sharma	Communist Party of India
203	Pun Pun	SC	Mahabir Paswan	Indian National Congress
204	Patna South	None	Ram Lakhan Singh Yadav	Indian National Congress
205	Patna East	None	Jamil Ahmad	Indian National Congress
206	Patna West	None	Sunil Mukherjee	Communist Party of India
207	Danapur	None	Budh Deo Singh	Indian National Congress
208	Maner	None	Ram Nagina Singh	Indian National Congress
209	Bikram	None	Khaderan Singh	Indian National Congress
210	Paliganj	None	Kanhai Singh	Indian National Congress
211	Sandesh	None	Ramjee Prasad Singh	Bharatiya Jana Sangh
212	Arrah	None	Sumitra Devi	Indian National Congress
213	Barhara	None	Ram Vilash Singh	Indian National Congress
214	Shahpur	None	Suraj Nath Choubey	Indian National Congress
215	Brahampur	None	Rishi Kesh Tewary	Indian National Congress
216	Dumraon	None	Harihar Prasad Singh	Indian National Congress
217	Nawanagar	SC	Lal Behari Prasad	Communist Party of India
218	Buxar	None	Jag Narain Trivedi	Indian National Congress
219	Ramgarh	None	Sachchida Nand Singh	Socialist Party
220	Mohania	SC	Suresh Kumar	Indian National Congress
221	Chainpur	None	Lal Muni Chaubey	Bharatiya Jana Sangh
222	Dhabua	None	Shyam Narain Pandey	Indian National Congress
223	Chenari	SC	Ram Bachan Paswan	Hindustani Shoshit Dal
224	Sasaram	None	Ramsevak Singh	Hindustani Shoshit Dal
225	Dehri	None	Abdul Quayom Ansari	Indian National Congress
226	Karakat	None	Manorma Pandey	Indian National Congress
227	Nokha	None	Jagdish Ojha	Indian National Congress
228	Dinara	None	Ram Narain Sah	Indian National Congress
229	Bikramganj	None	Sant Prasad Singh	Communist Party of India
230	Jagdismpur	None	Shiv Pujan Varma	Indian National Congress
231	Piro	None	Jay Narayan	Indian National Congress
232	Sahar	SC	Rajdeo Ram	Independent
233	Arwal	None	Rang Bahadur Singh	Independent
234	Kurtha	None	Ramashray Pd. Singh	Indian National Congress
235	Makhdumpur	SC	Ram Sawroop Ram	Indian National Congress
236	Jehanabad	None	Hari Lal Prasad Sinha	Indian National Congress
237	Ghosi	None	Ramashraya Prasad Singh	Communist Party of India
238	Belaganj	None	Jitendra Pd. Singh	Indian National Congress
239	Gom	None	Muneshwer Nath Singh	Indian National Congress
240	Daudnagar	None	Ram Vilas Singh	Socialist Party
241	Obra	None	Narain Singh	Indian National Congress
242	Nabinagar	None	Yugal Singh	Indian National Congress
243	Aurangabad	None	Brij Mohan Singh	Indian National Congress
244	Rafiganj	SC	Faguni Ram	Indian National Congress
245	Imamganj	SC	Awadheshewar Ram	Indian National Congress
246	Sherghati	None	Jairam Giri	Indian National Congress
247	Barachatti	SC	Mohan Ram	Indian National Congress
248	Bodh Gaya	SC	Balik Ram	Communist Party of India
249	Konch	None	Nand Kumar Singh	Socialist Party
250	Gaya	None	Yugal Kishore Prasad	Indian National Congress
251	Gaya Muffasil	None	Surajdeo Singh	Indian National Congress
252	Atri	None	Maheshwari Prasad Singh	Indian National Congress
253	Hisua	None	Shatruhan Sharan Singh	Indian National Congress
254	Nawada	None	Gayatri Devi	Indian National Congress
255	Rajauli	SC	Banwari Ram	Indian National Congress
256	Warsaliganj	None	Shyam Sunder Pd. Singh	Indian National Congress
257	Gobindpur	None	Amarit Prasad	Indian National Congress
258	Kodarma	None	Rajendranath Dan	Indian National Congress
259	Dhanwar	None	Punit Rai	Indian National Congress
260	Gawan	SC	Taneshwar Azad	Indian National Congress
261	Jamua	None	Ritlal Prasad Verma	Bharatiya Jana Sangh
262	Giridih	None	Chaturanan Mishra	Communist Party of India
263	Dumri	None	Murli Bhagat	Indian National Congress
264	Bermo	None	Vindeshwari Dubey	Indian National Congress
265	Bagodar	None	K. Basant Narain Singh	Bharatiya Jana Sangh
266	Barhi	None	Rameshwar Prasad Mahtha	Indian National Congress
267	Hazaribagh	None	Raghunandan Prasad	Bharatiya Jana Sangh
268	Chauparan	None	Nand Kishore Singh	Indian National Congress
269	Chatra	None	Tapeshwar Deo	Indian National Congress
270	Barkagaon	SC	Mahesh Ram	Bharatiya Jana Sangh
271	Ramgarh	None	Manzurul Hassan Khan, Shahdun Nisha	Communist Party of India
272	Mandu	None	Birendra Kumar Pandey	Indian National Congress
273	Jaridih	None	Chhatru Ram Mahton	Bharatiya Jana Sangh
274	Chandankiyari	SC	Durga Charan Das	Indian National Congress
275	Topchanchi	None	Shankar Dayal Singh	Indian National Congress
276	Baghmara	None	Imamul Hai Khan	Indian National Congress
277	Dhanbad	None	Chinmoy Mukherjee	Communist Party of India
278	Tundi	None	Satya Narayan Singh	Indian National Congress
279	Nirsa	None	Nirmalendu Bhattacharya	Communist Party of India
280	Sindri	None	A. K. Roy	Independent
281	Jharia	None	Sheo Kumar Rai	Communist Party of India
282	Baharagora	None	Shibu Ranjan Khan	Indian National Congress
283	Ghatsila	ST	Tika Ram Majhi	Communist Party of India
284	Patamda	None	Ghana Shyam Mahato	Indian National Congress
285	Jamshedpur East	None	Kedar Das	Communist Party of India
286	Jamshedpur West	None	Ramavatar Singh	Communist Party of India
287	Jugsalia	ST	Sanatan Majhi	Independent
288	Sakaikella	None	Shatbhanu Singhdeo	Indian National Congress
289	Chaibassa	ST	Bagun Sumbrui	All India Jharkhand Party
290	Majhgaon	ST	Debendra Nath Champia	Independent
291	Manoharpur	ST	Durga Prasad Jamuda	Indian National Congress
292	Jaganathpur	ST	Sidiu Hembrom	Indian National Congress
293	Chakradharpur	ST	Theodore Bodra	Indian National Congress
294	Ichagarh	None	Shatrughan Aditya Deo	Independent
295	Kharsawan	ST	Gulab Singh Munda	All India Jharkhand Party
296	Tamar	ST	Banmali Singh Munda	Indian National Congress
297	Tokpa	ST	Virsing Munda	Jan Kranti Dal
298	Khunti	ST	Tiru Muchi Rai Munda	Indian National Congress
299	Silli	SC	Ram Ratan Ram	Indian National Congress
300	Khijri	ST	Umrao Sadho Kujur	Indian National Congress
301	Ranchi	None	Deopat Sahu	Indian National Congress
302	Kanke	None	Ram Tahal Chaudhary	Bharatiya Jana Sangh
303	Kolebira	ST	S. K. Bage	All India Jharkhand Party
304	Simdega	ST	Simon Tigga	Indian National Congress
305	Chainpur	ST	Jairam Oraon	Independent
306	Gumla	ST	Bairagi Oraon	Indian National Congress
307	Sisai	ST	Sukru Bhagat	Indian National Congress
308	Bero	ST	Karam Chand Bhagat	Indian National Congress
309	Mandar	ST	Srikrishna Bhagat	Indian National Congress
310	Lohardaga	ST	Bihari Lakba	Indian National Congress
311	Latehar	ST	Vijoy Virendra Kumar	Indian National Congress
312	Panki	SC	Nal Deo Ram	Indian National Congress
313	Daltongaj	None	Puran Chand	Socialist Party
314	Garhwa	None	Awadh Kishore Tiwari	Indian National Congress
315	Bhawanathpur	None	Shanker Pratap Deo	Indian National Congress
316	Leslieganj	None	Bhisma Narayan Singh	Indian National Congress
317	Bishrampur	SC	Ramdeni Ram	Indian National Congress
318	Hussainabad	None	Awadhesh Kumar Singh	Independent
