= Lahowal Assembly constituency =

Constituency of the Assam legislative assembly in India

Coordinates: 27.45°N 95.00°E

Lahowal
- Former constituency No. 117 for the Assam Legislative Assembly

Constituency details
- Country: India
- Region: Northeast India
- State: Assam
- District: Dibrugarh
- Lok Sabha constituency: Dibrugarh
- Established: 1957
- Abolished: 2023
- Reservation: None

Lahowal Assembly constituency was one of the 126 assembly constituencies of Assam Legislative Assembly. Lahowal formed part of the Dibrugarh Lok Sabha constituency. This constituency was abolished in 2023.

== Members of Legislative Assembly ==
Election	Member	Party affiliation
1957	Lily Sengupta	Indian National Congress
1962	Lily Sengupta	Indian National Congress
1967	Lily Sengupta	Indian National Congress
1972	Dipak Moormoo	Indian National Congress
1978	Dipak Moormoo	Indian National Congress
1983	Dipak Moormoo	Indian National Congress
1985	Dipen Tanti	Independent
1991	Haren Bhumij	Indian National Congress
1996	Prithibi Majhi	Indian National Congress
2001	Prithibi Majhi	Indian National Congress
2006	Prithibi Majhi	Indian National Congress
2011	Prithibi Majhi	Indian National Congress
2016	Rituparna Baruah	Bharatiya Janata Party
2021	Binod Hazarika	Bharatiya Janata Party

== Election results ==
=== 2016 ===
2016 Assam Legislative Assembly election: Lahowal
Party	Candidate	Votes	%	±%
BJP	Rituparna Baruah	59,013	54.05	
INC	Prithibi Majhi	39,414	36.10	
CPI	Rajesh Rajput	3,022	2.76	
Independent	Ranjit Konwar	1,753	1.60	
Independent	Sombhulal Sabor	1,568	1.43	
Independent	Priyanath Gogoi	911	0.83	
JCP	Boga Kumar Nag	857	0.78	
NOTA	None of the above	3,039	2.78	
Majority		19,599	17.95	
Turnout		1,09,177	85.66	
Registered electors		1,27,443		
BJP gain from INC		Swing		
