= Golaghat Assembly constituency =

Constituency of the Assam legislative assembly in India

Golaghat
- Constituency No. 103 for the Assam Legislative Assembly

Constituency details
- Country: India
- Region: Northeast India
- State: Assam
- District: Golaghat
- Lok Sabha constituency: Kaziranga
- Established: 1951
- Reservation: None

Member of Legislative Assembly
- 16th Assam Legislative Assembly
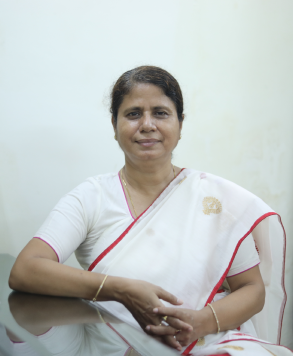
- Incumbent Ajanta Neog
- Party: BJP
- Elected year: 2021

Golaghat Assembly constituency is one of the 126 assembly constituencies of Assam Legislative Assembly. Golaghat forms part of the Kaziranga Lok Sabha constituency.

== Members of Legislative Assembly ==
Election	Member	Political party
1952	Rajendranath Barua	Indian National Congress
1957	Rajendranath Barua	Indian National Congress
1962	Dandeswar Hazarika	Indian National Congress
1967	Soneswar Bora	Samyukta Socialist Party
1972	Soneswar Bora	Socialist Party
1978	Soneswar Bora	Janata Party
1983	Nagen Neog	Indian National Congress
1985	Debeswar Bora	Independent politician
1991	Nagen Neog	Indian National Congress
1996	Atul Bora	Asom Gana Parishad
2001	Ajanta Neog	Indian National Congress
2006	Ajanta Neog	Indian National Congress
2011	Ajanta Neog	Indian National Congress
2016	Ajanta Neog	Indian National Congress
2021	Ajanta Neog	Bharatiya Janata Party
2026	Ajanta Neog	Bharatiya Janata Party

== Election results ==
=== 2026 ===
2026 Assam Legislative Assembly election: Golaghat
Party	Candidate	Votes	%	±%
BJP	Ajanta Neog	102,212	61.88	▲11.25
INC	Bitupan Saikia	58,453	35.39	▼8.95
Independent	Rubul Borah	2,277	1.38	New
NOTA	None of the above	2,243	1.36	▼0.03
Margin of victory		43,759	30.49	▲24.70
Turnout		165,185	81.86	▲3.27
Registered electors		2,01,788		▼1.66
BJP hold		Swing		

=== 2021 ===
Assam Legislative Assembly Election, 2021: Golaghat
Party	Candidate	Votes	%	±%
BJP	Ajanta Neog	81,651	50.63	▲4.01
INC	Bitupan Saikia	72,326	44.84	▼5.32
AJP	Reena Saikia	5,062	3.14	New
NOTA	None of the above	2,245	1.39	▲0.24
Majority		9,325	5.79	▲2.25
Turnout		1,61,284	78.59	▲5.47
Registered electors		2,05,196		▲17.16
BJP gain from INC		Swing		

=== 2016 ===
2016 Assam Legislative Assembly election: Golaghat
Party	Candidate	Votes	%	±%
INC	Ajanta Neog	73,862	50.16	▼14.72
BJP	Bitupan Saikia	68,649	46.62	▲44.03
AIUDF	Syed Jahid Abdullah	1,804	1.22	New
Independent	Dipankar Das	1,193	0.81	New
NOTA	None of the above	1,717	1.16	New
Majority		5,213	3.54	▼34.07
Turnout		1,47,225	84.06	▲6.72
Registered electors		1,75,129		▲10.33
INC hold		Swing		

=== 2011 ===
2011 Assam Legislative Assembly election: Golaghat
Party	Candidate	Votes	%	±%
INC	Ajanta Neog	79,648	64.88	
AGP	Amiyo Bora	33,477	27.27	
AITC	Debeswar Bora	5,006	4.08	
BJP	Debajit Bora	3,179	2.59	
NCP	Amrit Goswami	1,447	1.18	
Majority		46,171	37.61	
Turnout		1,22,757	77.34	
Registered electors		1,58,719		
INC hold		Swing		
