= Rebati Das =

Indian politician

Member of Assam Legislative Assembly
- In office 1972 - 1978
- Preceded by: S. Medhi
- Succeeded by: Lakshyadhar Choudhury
- Constituency: Jalukbari

Personal details
- Party: Indian National Congress
- Spouse: Sasadhar Das
- Children: Ajanta Neog
- Relatives: Nagen Neog (son in law)

Rebati Das was an Indian National Congress politician from the state of Assam. She was a former Member of Assam Legislative Assembly for Jalukbari. She was the mother of finance minister Ajanta Neog and mother in law of ex-minister Nagen Neog.

== Political career ==
Das was the Indian National Congress candidate for Jalukbari in the 1972 Assam Legislative Assembly election. She received 8809 votes, 38.35% of the total vote, defeating her nearest opponent by 3045 votes. She sought reelection in the 1978 Assam Legislative Assembly election. She received 3550 votes, 8.67% of the total vote, placing third and was succeeded by Janata Party candidate Lakshyadhar Choudhury.
