= 1972 Assam Legislative Assembly election =

Legislative Assembly election in Assam, India

- 7 March 1972

114 seats in the Assam Legislative Assembly 58 seats needed for a majority
- Registered: 6,328,537
- Turnout: 60.85%
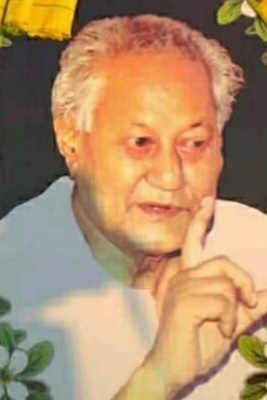
	Majority party	Minority party
		Soc
Leader	Sarat Chandra Singha
Party	INC(R)	Socialist Party (India, 1971)
Seats before	77	4
Seats won	95	4
Seat change	▲22	–
Popular vote	53.20%	5.77
CM before election
Mahendra Mohan Choudhry
INC
Elected CM
Sarat Chandra Singha
INC

Elections to the Assam Legislative Assembly were held in March 1972 to elect members of 114 constituencies in Assam, India. The Indian National Congress won the popular vote and a majority of seats and Sarat Chandra Singha was re-appointed as the Chief Minister of Assam. The number of constituencies was set at 126 by the recommendation of the Delimitation Commission of India.

== Result ==
Party	Votes	%	Seats	+/–
Indian National Congress	1,976,209	53.20	95	▲22
Socialist Party	214,342	5.77	4	0
Communist Party of India	209,550	5.64	3	▼4
Plain Tribals Council of Assam	62,108	1.67	1	New
Swatantra Party	21,663	0.58	1	▼2
Others	125,928	3.39	0	0
Independents	1,104,977	29.75	10	▼16
Total	3,714,777	100.00	114	▲9
Valid votes	3,714,777	96.47		
Invalid/blank votes	136,122	3.53		
Total votes	3,850,899	100.00		
Registered voters/turnout	6,328,537	60.85		
Source: ECI

== Elected members ==
Constituency	Reserved for (SC/ST/None)	Member	Party
Ratabari	None	Suranjan Nandy	Indian National Congress
Patharakandi	None	Biswanath Upadhyay	Indian National Congress
Karimganj North	None	Abdul Muqtadir Choudury	Indian National Congress
Karimganj South	SC	Sudarsan Das	Indian National Congress
Bardapur	None	M. A. Jalil Choudhury	Indian National Congress
Mailakandi	None	Abdur Rahman Choudhury	Indian National Congress
Katlicherra	None	Santosh Kumar Roy	Indian National Congress
Silchar	None	Mohitosh Purkayastha	Indian National Congress
Sonai	None	Nurul Haque Choudhury	Indian National Congress
Dholat	SC	D. C. Purkayastha	Indian National Congress
Lakhimpur	None	Shubhankar Singha	Indian National Congress
Udharbond	None	Jagannath Sinha	Indian National Congress
Borkhola	None	Dr. Lutfur Rahman	Indian National Congress
Katigora	None	Abdul Hamid Majumder	Indian National Congress
Haflong	ST	J. B. Hagjer	Indian National Congress
Bokajan	ST	Saisai Terang	Indian National Congress
Howraghat	ST	Chatrasing Teron	Indian National Congress
Baithalangso	ST	Dhani Ram Rongpi	Indian National Congress
Manakachar	None	Jurul Islan	Indian National Congress
South Salmara	None	Bazlul Basit	Indian National Congress
Dhubri	None	Mohammad Umaruddin	Indian National Congress
Gauripur	None	Syed Ahmed Ali	Indian National Congress
Golakganj	None	K. C. Ray Pradhani	Independent
Bilasipara	None	Giasuddin Ahmed	Independent
Gossaigaon	None	Mithius Tudu	Indian National Congress
Kokrajhar West	ST	Charan Narzary	Plain Tribals Council of Assam
Kokrajhar East	None	Sarat Chandra Sinha	Indian National Congress
Sidli	ST	Uttam Brahma	Indian National Congress
Bijni	None	Golak Chandra Patgiri	Indian National Congress
Adhayapuri	SC	Ayohdhya Ram Das	Indian National Congress
Bongaigon	None	Dhruba Barua	Indian National Congress
Goalpara West	None	Sahadat Ali Jotedar	Indian National Congress
Goalpara East	None	Balabhadra Das	Indian National Congress
Dudnai	ST	Anandi Bala Rava	Indian National Congress
Sorbhog	None	Pranita Talukdar	Indian National Congress
Bhabanipur	None	Ghana Kanta Baro	Independent
Patacharkuchi	None	Krishna Kanta Lahkar	Indian National Congress
Barpeta	None	Surendra Nath Das	Indian National Congress
Jania	None	Ataur Rahman	Indian National Congress
Baghbar	None	Jalal Uddin	Indian National Congress
Sarukhetri	SC	Kandarpa Kumar Das	Indian National Congress
Chenga	None	Abdul Hannan Choudhury	Indian National Congress
Boko	None	Prabin Kumar Choudhury	Indian National Congress
Chayagaon	None	Satyavati Gossami	Indian National Congress
Palasbari	None	Harendra Nath Talukdar	Indian National Congress
Gauhati East	None	Atul Chandrasaikia	Indian National Congress
Gauhati West	None	Biren Ram Phookun	Indian National Congress
Jalukbari	None	Rebati Das	Indian National Congress
Majo	None	Ranuka Debi Barkataki	Independent
Nalbari West	None	Bhumidhar Barman	Indian National Congress
Nalbari East	None	Badan Ch. Talukdar	Socialist Party
Borbhag	None	Gauri S. Bhattacharyya	Independent
Darama	ST	Surendra Nath Das	Indian National Congress
Tamulpur	ST	Ambarish Ch Lahari	Indian National Congress
Rangiya	None	Manabendra Nath Sarmah	Indian National Congress
Kahalpur	None	Girindara C. Choudhury	Indian National Congress
Panery	None	Ramesh Chandra Saharia	Indian National Congress
Kalaigaon	None	Lakshmi Kanta Saikia	Indian National Congress
Rangamati	SC	Upendra Das	Indian National Congress
Mangadli	None	Syed Anwara Taimur	Indian National Congress
Dalgaon	None	Hashimuduin Ahmed	Indian National Congress
Udalaguri	ST	Bahadur Basumatari	Indian National Congress
Dhekiajuli	None	Hiranya Bora	Indian National Congress
Missamari	None	Bijoy Chandra Sarmah	Indian National Congress
Tezpur	None	Robindra Kumar Goswami	Indian National Congress
Balipara	None	Golok Rajbanshi	Indian National Congress
Sootea	None	Swarna Probha Mahanta	Indian National Congress
Biswanath	None	Kisheswar Bora	Independent
Gohpur	None	Ram Chandra Sarmah	Socialist Party
Marigaon	ST	Pitsing Konwar	Independent
Bokani	SC	Jagadish Das	Indian National Congress
Laharighat	None	Abul Kasem	Indian National Congress
Raha	None	Gunendra Nath Pandit	Indian National Congress
Dhing	None	Abul Hussain Mir	Indian National Congress
Rupohihat	None	Mahammad Idris	Indian National Congress
Nowgong	None	Lila Kanta Bora	Indian National Congress
Barhampur	None	Kehoram Hazarika	Communist Party of India
Kaliabor	None	Golap Chandra Barua	Indian National Congress
Samaguri	None	Bishnu Prasad	Indian National Congress
Jamunamukh	None	Debendra Nath Bora	Indian National Congress
Hojai	None	Idris Ali Fakir	Indian National Congress
Lumding	None	Santi Ranajan Dasgupta	Indian National Congress
Bokakhar	SC	Tulsi Das	Indian National Congress
Sarupathar	None	Chatra Gopal Karmakar	Indian National Congress
Golaghat	None	Soneswar Bora	Socialist Party
Dergaon	None	Imalendra Baruah	Socialist Party
Majuli	ST	Mal Chandna Pegu	Indian National Congress
Jorhat	None	Bijoy Krishna Handiqui	Indian National Congress
Charaibahi	None	Dulal Chandra Baruah	Independent
Titabar	None	Joy Chandra Bora	Indian National Congress
Mariani	None	Gajen Tanti	Indian National Congress
Teok	None	Dulal Chandra Khound	Communist Party of India
Amguri	None	Puspadhar Chaliha	Indian National Congress
Sibsagar	None	Promode Chandra Gogoi	Communist Party of India
Thowra	None	Narau Kamar	Indian National Congress
Nazira	None	Hiteswar Saikia	Indian National Congress
Mahmara	None	Khogen Gogoi	Indian National Congress
Sonari	None	Janakinath Hansiqui	Independent
Bimpuria	None	Premadhq Bora	Independent
Naobotha	SC	Lila Kanta Das	Indian National Congress
North Lakhimpur	None	Govind Chandra Bora	Indian National Congress
Dhakukhana	ST	Lakshya Nath Doley	Indian National Congress
Dhemaji	ST	Romesh Mohon Kuli	Swatantra Party
Moran	None	Tarun Chandra Chutiya	Indian National Congress
Dibrugarh	None	Ramesh Chandra Barooah	Indian National Congress
Lahowal	None	Dipak Moormoo	Indian National Congress
Tengakhat	None	Indreswar Khaund	Indian National Congress
Tingkhong	None	Rajendra Nath Phukon	Indian National Congress
Joypur	None	Kshirode Chandra Saikia	Indian National Congress
Bogdung	None	Upendra Nath Sanatan	Indian National Congress
Tinsukia	None	Paramananda Gogoi	Indian National Congress
Digboi	None	Chandra Bahadur Chetri	Indian National Congress
Doom Dooma	None	Malia Tanti	Indian National Congress
Saikhowa	None	Tarulata Bora	Indian National Congress

== See also ==
- List of constituencies of the Assam Legislative Assembly
- 1972 elections in India
