= Nagen Neog =

Indian politician

Minister for Rural Development
- Chief Minister: Hiteswar Saikia

Member of Assam Legislative Assembly
- In office 1991 - 6 May 1996
- Preceded by: Debeswar Bora
- Succeeded by: Atul Bora
- Constituency: Golaghat
- In office 1983 - 1985
- Preceded by: Soneswar Bora
- Succeeded by: Debeswar Bora
- Constituency: Golaghat

Personal details
- Died: 6 May 1996
- Party: Indian National Congress
- Spouse: Ajanta Neog
- Relatives: Rebati Das (Mother in law)

Nagen Neog (died 6 May 1996) was an Indian politician from the state of Assam. He served as Member of Assam Legislative Assembly for Golgahat and as Rural Development Minister in the Hiteswar Saikia Cabinet until his assassination. He was the husband of the current Finance minister of Assam, Ajanta Neog, and son in law of MLA Rebati Das.

== Political career ==
Neog was the Indian National Congress candidate for the constituency of Golaghat in the 1983 Assam Legislative Assembly election. He received 2222 votes, 89.34% of the total vote and won the seat, defeating his nearest opponent by 2063 votes. He lost in the 1985 Assam Legislative Assembly election. He was again the Indian National Congress candidate for Golaghat in 1991, when he received 27222 votes, 38.82% of the total vote, and became an MLA again. He became Rural Development Minister in the Hiteswar Saikia cabinet.

=== Death ===
On 6 May 1996, two days after the 1996 Assam Legislative Assembly election, Neog was returning home in Baruagaon,15 kilometres from the District Headquarter town of Golaghat. Neog, with 8 people including his driver and 5 bodyguards were all killed. The accused killers served time in prison but were later acquitted in 2013 on grounds of lack of evidence.
