= Tingkhong Assembly constituency =

Constituency of the Assam legislative assembly in India

Tingkhong
- Constituency No. 119 for the Assam Legislative Assembly

Constituency details
- Country: India
- Region: Northeast India
- State: Assam
- District: Dibrugarh
- Lok Sabha constituency: Dibrugarh
- Established: 1967
- Reservation: None

Tingkhong Assembly constituency is one of the 126 assembly constituencies of Assam Legislative Assembly. Tingkhong forms part of the Dibrugarh Lok Sabha constituency.

== Members of Legislative Assembly ==
Year	Name	Party
1967	B. Gogoi	Samyukta Socialist Party
1972	Rajendra Nath Phukan	Indian National Congress
1978	Bhadreswar Gogoi	Janata Party
1985	Atul Chandra Koch	Independent
1991	Prithibi Majhi	Indian National Congress
1996	Atuwa Munda	Indian National Congress
2001	Atuwa Munda	Indian National Congress
2006	Anup Phukan	Asom Gana Parishad
2011	Atuwa Munda	Indian National Congress
2016	Bimal Bora	Bharatiya Janata Party
2021	Bimal Bora	Bharatiya Janata Party

== Election results ==
=== 2026 ===
2026 Assam Legislative Assembly election: Tingkhong
Party	Candidate	Votes	%	±%
BJP	Bimal Bora	88912	61.19	
INC	Bipul Gogoi	39886	27.45	
JMM	Mahabir Baske	14205	9.78	
NOTA	None of the above	2295	1.58	
Margin of victory		49026		
Turnout		145298		
Registered electors				
BJP hold		Swing		

=== 2021 ===
2021 Assam Legislative Assembly election: Tingkhong
Party	Candidate	Votes	%	±%
BJP	Bimal Bora	62,675	52.66	−1.95
INC	Atuwa Munda	34,281	28.8	−8.26
AJP	Subhakaran Konhain	16,690	14.02	
Independent	Bikash Kullu	3,445	2.89	
NOTA	None of the above	1,928	1.62	−0.36
Majority		28,394	23.86	+6.31
Turnout		1,19,019	79.49	−5.95
Registered electors		1,49,731		
BJP hold		Swing		

=== 2016 ===
2016 Assam Legislative Assembly election: Tingkhong
Party	Candidate	Votes	%	±%
BJP	Bimal Bora	57,072	54.61	+38.66
INC	Atuwa Munda	38,734	37.06	−11.90
Independent	Anup Phukan	2,935	2.80	
CPI(ML)L	Mira Tanti	1,299	1.24	
Independent	Dilip Bharali	1,235	1.18	
JDP	Eliash Sichan	1,150	1.10	
NOTA	None of the above	2,075	1.98	
Majority		18,338	17.55	−0.61
Turnout		1,04,500	85.44	+11.67
Registered electors		1,22,295		
BJP gain from INC		Swing		

=== 2011 ===
2011 Assam Legislative Assembly election: Tingkhong
Party	Candidate	Votes	%	±%
INC	Atuwa Munda	41,839	48.96	
AGP	Anup Phukan	26,315	30.80	
BJP	Dipu Ranjan Makrari	13,626	15.95	
CPI(ML)L	Tufan Gowala	2,306	2.70	
JMM	Keshab Saikia	1,364	1.60	
Majority		15,524	18.16	
Turnout		85,450	73.77	
Registered electors		1,15,836		
INC gain from AGP		Swing		
