= 1972 Mizoram Legislative Assembly election =

Election in India

- 8 April 1972

All 30 seats in the Mizoram Legislative Assembly 16 seats needed for a majority
- Registered: 156,901
- Turnout: 72.90%
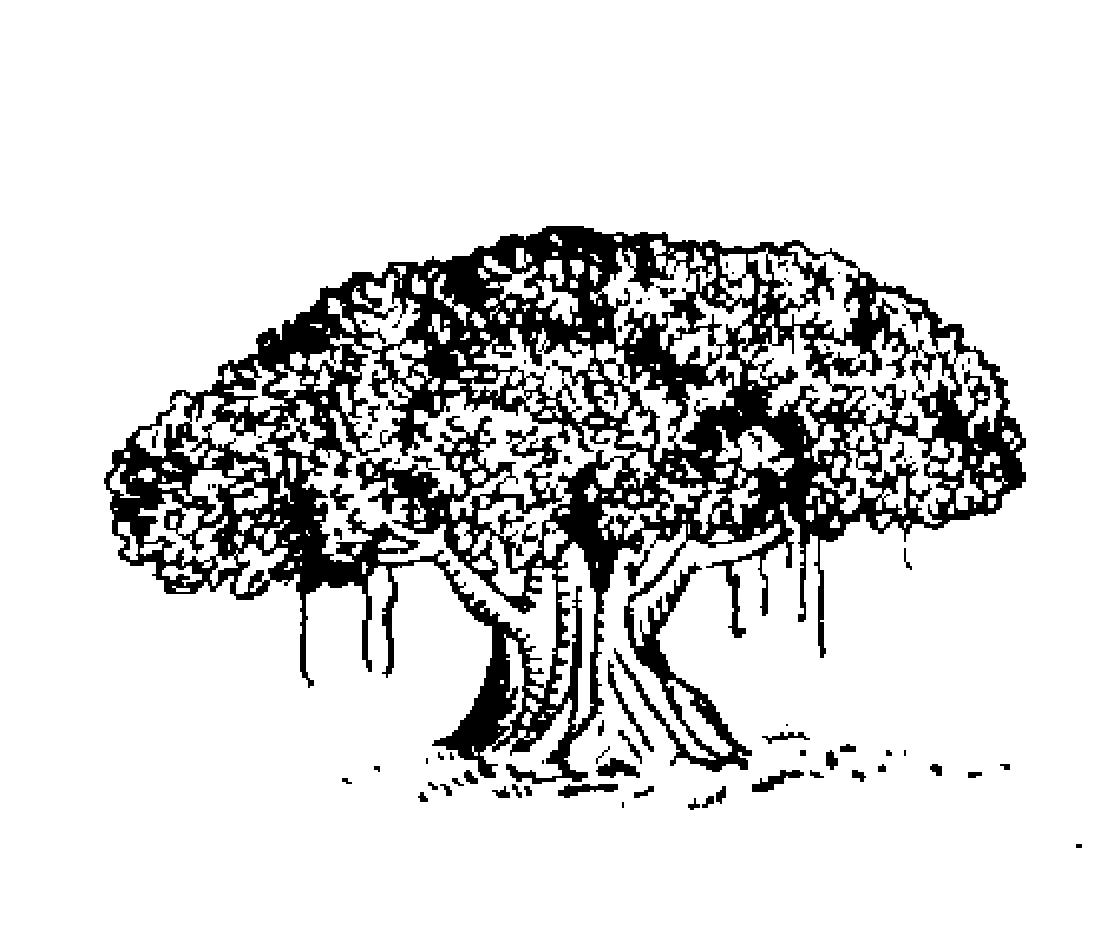
	Majority party	Minority party	Third party
Party	INC(R)	SSP	Independent
Seats won	6	0	24
Popular vote	30.91%	1.54%	67.55%
CM before election
Office established
Elected CM
C. Chhunga
Mizo Union

The first elections to the Mizoram Legislative Assembly were held on 8 April 1972 to elect members of the 30 constituencies in Mizoram, India. After the elections, C. Chhunga was appointed as the first Chief Minister of Mizoram.

Mizoram in Northeast India was, in 1972, a newly created Union Territory, after the passing of the North-Eastern Areas (Reorganisation) Act, 1971. It was assigned a Legislative Assembly of 30 members.

== Parties Contested ==
No.	Party	Flag	Symbol	Leader	Seats contested
1.	Indian National Congress			Indira Gandhi	29
2.	Samyukta Socialist Party			George Fernandes	18
3.	Independents			collective leadership	108

== Result ==
Party	Votes	%	Seats
Indian National Congress	34,421	30.91	6
Samyukta Socialist Party	1,713	1.54	0
Independents	75,224	67.55	24
Total	111,358	100.00	30
Valid votes	111,358	97.35	
Invalid/blank votes	3,028	2.65	
Total votes	114,386	100.00	
Registered voters/turnout	156,901	72.90	
Source: ECI

== Elected members ==
#	Constituency	Candidate	Party
1	Tuipang	Hiphei	Independent
2	Sangau	Sangchhun	Independent
3	Saiha	Sapliana Vandir	Independent
4	Chawngte	Satio Prio	Indian National Congress
5	Demagiri	Hari Kristo Chakma	Indian National Congress
6	Buarpui	P. B. Nikhuma	Independent
7	Lungleh	K. L. Rochama	Independent
8	South Vanlaiphai	Saitlawma	Independent
9	Hnahthial	Thangzika	Independent
10	North Vanlaiphai	R. Dotinaia	Independent
11	Khawbung	Fhrangvela	Independent
12	Champhai	Lalhlira	Independent
13	Khaw	Zawl Vanlalhruata	Independent
14	Ratu	Sangkhuma	Independent
15	Suangpuilwan	H. Thansanga	Independent
16	Saitual	Khawtinkhuma	Independent
17	Ilungvel	Hrangaia	Independent
18	Khawhai	J. Thanghdama	Indian National Congress
19	Lungpho	C Lalruata	Independent
20	Serchhip	Vaivenga	Independent
21	Phuldungsei	Lalkunga	Indian National Congress
22	Sateek	Raite Zoliana	Independent
23	Aizawl South	Laisanguala	Indian National Congress
24	Aizawl Central	Lalrinliana	Independent
25	Aizawal North	R. Thangliana	Independent
26	Kawnpui	Ch Saprawnga	Independent
27	Kolasib	Ch Chhunga	Independent
28	Sairang	Ng Vrdawla	Independent
29	Mamit	C Chawngkunga	Independent
30	Renguil	Zalawma	Indian National Congress

== See also ==
- List of constituencies of the Mizoram Legislative Assembly
- 1972 elections in India
