= Haren Bhumij =

Indian politician

Haren Bhumij is a politician from Indian National Congress who served as Member of Parliament, Lok Sabha, from Dibrugarh (Lok Sabha constituency) in 1977 and 1984. He was also elected as the Member of Legislative Assembly from Lahowal (Vidhan Sabha constituency) in 1991.

== See also ==
- Dibrugarh (Lok Sabha constituency)
- Lahowal (Vidhan Sabha constituency)
