= Shahdun Nisha =

Indian politician

Shahdun Nisha, an Indian politician. She was elected to the Bihar Legislative Assembly from Ramgarh in a 1973 by-poll, as a Communist Party of India (CPI) candidate. She obtained 28,994 votes in the by-poll. Shahdun Nisha was the widow of CPI leader Manjur Hassan Khan, who had won the Ramgarh seat in the 1972 election but died in 1973.
