= Ajanta Neog =

Indian politician

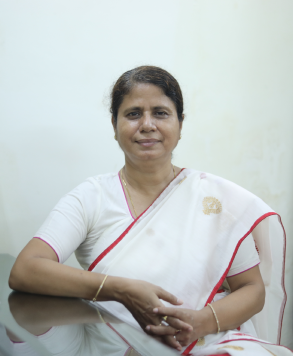
- Neog in 2020

Cabinet Minister, Assam
- Incumbent
- Assumed office 10 May 2021
- Chief Minister: Himanta Biswa Sarma
- Portfolios: Finance; Social Welfare (2021–22); Women and Child Development (2022–present)
- Preceded by: Himanta Biswa Sarma (Finance); Pramila Rani Brahma (Social Welfare)
- In office 21 May 2006 – 24 May 2016
- Chief Minister: Tarun Gogoi
- Portfolios: Social Welfare, Jails (2006–08); Public Works Development (2008–2016); Technical Education (2008); Urban Development and Housing (2011–15); Guwahati Development (2012–16); Planning and Development, Judicial, Legislative and Law (2015–16)
- Preceded by: Gautam Roy (SW, Jails); Tarun Gogoi (PWD, GDD); Dinesh Prasad Goala (UD&H); Tanka Bahadur Rai (Planning, etc.)
- Succeeded by: Akon Bora (SW, Jails); Parimal Suklabaidya (PWD); Sumitra Patir (UD&H); Himanta Biswa Sarma (Planning, etc.)

Minister of State, Assam
- In office 7 June 2002 – 21 May 2006
- Chief Minister: Tarun Gogoi
- Portfolios: Food and Civil Supplies; Tourism

Member, Assam Legislative Assembly
- Incumbent
- Assumed office 13 May 2001
- Preceded by: Atul Bora
- Constituency: Golaghat

Personal details
- Born: 1 January 1964 (age 62) Guwahati, Assam, India
- Party: Bharatiya Janata Party (since 2020)
- Other political affiliations: Indian National Congress (until 2020)
- Spouse: Nagen Neog (d. 1996)
- Children: 2 sons
- Parent: Rebati Das (mother)
- Education: Gauhati University (M.A.), LL.B, LL.M
- Occupation: Politician

Ajanta Neog (born 1964) is an Indian politician who served as the Minister of Finance and Women and Child Development in the Government of Assam from 2021 to 2026. She is the first woman Finance Minister of Assam. She has been representing the Golaghat Assembly seat consecutively for the past five terms since 2001. She also holds the record for being the longest-serving female legislator of Assam.

Currently, she is a member of the Bharatiya Janata Party which she joined in December 2020.

== Early life and education ==
Ajanta Neog was born in Guwahati to late Sasadhar Das and late Rebati Das. Her mother Rebati Das, was a former Member of the Assam Legislative Assembly representing Jalukbari constituency. She completed MA, LLB and LLM from Gauhati University and is an alumna of Handique Girls College. After completing her education, she practised law as an advocate at Gauhati High Court for a few years.

== Indian National Congress ==
She was first elected to the Assembly in 2001 after defeating her nearest rival by over 10000 votes. She was again victorious in the subsequent election held in 2006. In the 2011 assembly elections she won by a huge margin of 46171 votes. Consecutively, she won the 2016 assembly elections despite a 'BJP Wave' in upper Assam where a vast majority of the Congress candidates were defeated. She held the position of Minister for Public Works Department (Roads and Building, National Highways), Urban Development and Housing, and had been in the last three Cabinets. She was also given the additional charge of Minister for Planning and Development, Judicial, Legislative, Pension & Public Grievance in 2015. She was conferred with the Golaghat Ratna award by the United Chamber of Commerce, Golaghat.

During her tenure as the PWD minister, Assam achieved huge success in infrastructure development. Assam was adjudged the "Best Infrastructure Development State" in the big state category in the 13th States Conclave by the India Today Group held on 6 November 2015. Assam was adjudged the best State in Infrastructure Development because it had registered a 17 per cent increase in the length of paved road from 2011 to 2013–14, whereas the national average for the same period was four per cent.

== Bharatiya Janata Party ==
In December 2020, Ajanta Neog along with Rajdeep Goala (both incumbent legislators) joined the Bharatiya Janata Party after being expelled from Indian National Congress for their alleged "anti-party" activities. She called her former party ‘vision less’ and disconnected from people while speaking to reporters. She also said that she is joining the BJP to protect the interest of the indigenous people of Assam from the ‘unholy’ alliance of the Congress Party and AIUDF.

She subsequently won the 2021 Assembly election from the Golaghat constituency on a BJP ticket defeating her nearest rival from the Congress party. With this victory, she became an MLA for the 5th consecutive term from Golaghat constituency. She was inducted into the Himanta Biswa Sarma cabinet as the Finance Minister creating history by being the first woman to hold the finance portfolio in the state.

In the 2026 Assam Assembly elections, Ajanta Neog won in the Golaghat Assembly Constituency (No. 103), reaffirming the growing dominance of the Bharatiya Janata Party in Upper Assam. With a tally of 1,02,212 votes, Neog defeated Bitupan Saikia of the Indian National Congress by a margin of 43,759 votes. She lost her finance portfolio to Jayanta Malla Baruah in the Second Sarma ministry.

== Electoral history ==
Year	Constituency	Party	Votes	%	Opponent		Result	Margin
2001	Golaghat	INC	52,134	55.1%	Atul Bora	AGP	Won	10,930
2006	Golaghat	INC	66,072	53.2%	Atul Bora	AGP	Won	16,202
2011	Golaghat	INC	79,648	64.9%	Amiyo Kumar Borah	AGP	Won	46,171
2016	Golaghat	INC	73,862	50.8%	Bitupan Saikia	BJP	Won	5,213
2021	Golaghat	BJP	81,651	51.3%	Bitupan Saikia	INC	Won	9,325
2026	Golaghat	BJP	1,02,212	50.75%	Bitupan Saikia	INC	Won	43,759

== Personal life ==
Ajanta Neog was married to Karmashree Nagen Neog who was killed along with eight others by the outlawed United Liberation Front of Assam in 1996. Her husband was a former minister and belonged to the Chutia ethnic group. She has two sons.
