= Rituparna Baruah =

Indian politician

Rituparna Baruah is a Bharatiya Janata Party politician from Assam, India. He has been elected in Assam Legislative Assembly election in 2016 from Lahowal constituency.
