= P. Viswambharan =

Indian politician

Member of Kerala Legislative Assembly
- In office 1960-1964
- Constituency: Nemom

Personal details
- Born: 25 June 1925 Vellar, near Kovalam, Travancore, British India
- Died: 9 December 2016 (aged 91) Vellar, near Kovalam, Thiruvananthapuram, India
- Parent(s): Father: Padmanabhan; Mother: Chellamma

P. Viswambharan (25 June 1925 – 9 December 2016) was an Indian politician, socialist, trade unionist and journalist.

== Education ==
School: Pachalloor L.P. School, Venganor English Middle School and Thiruvananthapuram S.M.V School

College: Nagercoil Scott Christian College, Thiruvananthapuram Arts College and University College.

Degree in History and Economics.

== Political activities ==
While, studying in Thiruvananthapuram, joined the Quit India Movement. It was the beginning of his political career.

When the Students Congress was formed in 1940s, he has undertaken the task to organize its Thiruvthamcore unit.

In 1945, he was elected to the executive of the Travancore University Union.

In 1949, became a member of Socialist Party.

In 1950, became a member of the Trivandrum District Committee of Indian Socialist Party.

In 1956, became the State Joint Secretary of Praja Socialist Party.

In 1964, became the State General Secretary of Praja Socialist Party.

In 1971, became the State Chairman of Socialist Party.

P. Viswambharan was elected as the first Convener of the Left Democratic Front (LDF) which was formed in 1973.

In the period of 1975-77 he actively worked against the Emergency declared by the then prime minister Indira Gandhi.

After 1977, he served the Janata Party and Janata Dal party as its State President and National executive member.

== As a Legislator ==
In 1954, he was elected to the Thiruvithamcore-Cochin Assembly from Nemom constituency in Thiruvananthapuram District.

Again in 1960, he was elected to the Kerala Assembly from Nemom constituency.

In 1967 he was elected from the Thiruvananthapuram Parliament constituency to the Indian Parliament.

== As a journalist ==
From 1946 to 1958 he worked as a journalist for the Malayalam dailies like Malayali, Mathrubhumi, Swathrathanthakahalam and Desabandhu.

== Trade Union Field ==
He organized and led the Dakshina Thiruvithamkoor Karinkal Thozhilali Union, Dakshina Thiruvithamkoor Motor Thozhilali Union, Thiruvananthapuram Port Workers Union, Travancore Textile Workers Union, Kerala PWD work establishment Employees Union, Electricity board Ministerial Officers Union and so on.

== Co-operative Sector ==
Right from the beginning of the formation of the Coir Co-operative Movement in Thiru- Cochi State (in 1950) he was associated with it as an active leader and organizer.

He was the president for over 45 years in the Thiruvallam Pachalloor Coir Vyavasaya Sahakarana Samkham.

He worked as the president of Alappuzha Central Marketing Coir Cooperative Society.

He also worked as the vice president of Kerala Coir Marketing Federation for a long time.

He was associated as the executive committee member of the National Federation of Industrial Co-operatives.
