= Anup Phukan =

Indian politician

Anup Phukan is a politician from Assam and former member of Asom Gana Parishad. He was elected to the Assam Legislative Assembly in the 2006 election from Tingkhong constituency.
