= Revolutionary Socialist Party of India (Marxist–Leninist) =

Revolutionary Socialist Party of India (Marxist-Leninist)
- Founder: Keshab Prasad Sharma
- Founded: September 12, 1969
- Split from: Revolutionary Socialist Party
- Headquarters: Prayagraj (Allahabad)
- Ideology: Communism

The Revolutionary Socialist Party of India (Marxist-Leninist) is a political party in India. The party emerged from a split in the Revolutionary Socialist Party (RSP) in 1969, in rejection of the shift of the RSP into parliamentary coalition politics. The founding general secretary of the party was Keshab Prasad Sharma.

== Division in the RSP ==
Around the time of the 1965 Kerala Legislative Assembly election a dispute emerged with the RSP on the role of a Marxist-Leninist party within the framework of bourgeois parliamentary elections. Eventually the RSP settled on a line of seeking to join hands with opposition forces to build an electoral alternative to the governing Indian National Congress. But at the 1967 RSP All India Conference in Kanpur the head of the party in Uttar Pradesh, Keshab Prasad Sharma, put forth an alternative party line which argued that socialism could only be achieved through armed revolution and that electoral campaigns carried out done solely with the intention of mobilizing masses for armed struggle. It was argued that Sharma, who had been the leader of the Anushilan Samiti in the United Provinces during the struggle for national independence and was a founding member of the RSP, sought to become the general secretary of RSP. Sharma's thesis revived the division in RSP. The 1968 RSP Special Conference held in Delhi did not endorse the Sharma line. After the RSP conference Sharma seceded from the party.

Sharma took the Uttar Pradesh unit of the RSP with him, breaking with the RSP central organization. The Sharma-led group rejected the policy of coalition politics of the main RSP. On August 18, 1969 Sharma organized a press conference in Kanpur, announcing that the RSP had split and that he was now leading a separate RSP as its general secretary. At the press conference Sharma argued that his party would seek to unite militant socialist forces who adhered to Marxism and Scientific Socialism. RSPI(ML) was constituted at a party conference in Bihar on September 12, 1969.

== RSPI(ML) political line ==
RSPI(ML) rejected electoral participation if it didn't favour the development of armed struggle. The party stated that participation in parliamentary politics would lead to revisionism and petit bourgeois deviations. RSPI(ML) emphasized development of class consciousness. The party considered trade unions as institutions preserving the capitalist order, diverting class struggle into economism.

At the time of the split and the formation of RSPI(ML), the new party declared its immediate objective was the development of armed struggle. Sharma sought to build a united front of revolutionary groups on the basis of a common program. After the formation of RSPI(ML) Sharma reportedly tried to establish contacts with Andhra Pradesh revolutionary leader T. Nagi Reddy, who had begun armed squad actions. In Calcutta Sharma met with Barry Shepherd of the Fourth International and the West Bengal Trotskyists, albeit the Trotskyists had labelled Sharma's positions as 'chauvinist'.

After the RSP split, the Sharma RSP faction supported the Indian government in confrontations with Pakistan and China. RSPI(ML) took a neutral stance on the Sino-Soviet dispute. The party argued that the Soviet Union and China had deviated from Marxist practice and had developed state capitalism. But RSPI(ML) rejected the Chinese line of denouncing the Soviet Union as 'social imperialist'.

RSPI(ML) supported the Assam Movement. The party labelled Bihari Muslims displaced from Bangladesh as 'staunch enemies of Indian nationalism and newly emerged Bangladesh nationalism'. The party observed 'Assam People's Movement Day' on August 15, 1980, and the party organ Krantiyug called for resettlement of the Bihar Muslim refugees in other parts of India.

== Party organization ==
Sharma led RSPI(ML) as its general secretary. Another RSPI(ML) leader was D.O. Brahma. Compared to other communist parties in India, the RSPI(ML) had a more predominately working class membership. By the early 1980s RSPI(ML) had some 1,000 members, mainly workers in mining, steel industry or railways sections. There was a splinter faction of RSPI(ML), the Revolutionary Proletarian Platform (RPP).

The RSPI(ML) party headquarters were initially based in Kanpur, but were later moved to Allahabad (today Prayagraj). The party organ of RSPI(ML) is Krantiyug ('Revolutionary Era').

== Bibliography ==
- Reports on National Situations and Our Task: Prolelariat Socialist World Revolution Order of the Day. Revolutionary Socialist Party of India (Marxist-Leninist). All National Conference, 10th, Muzaffarpur, 1969
- Reports on International Situations and Our Task: Proletariat Socialist World Revolution Order of the Day. Revolutionary Socialist Party of India (Marxist-Leninist). All National Conference, 10th, Muzaffarpur, 1969
- Reports and the Thesis on National Situations: The Inevitability of the Third World War and Our Task. Revolutionary Socialist Party of India (Marxist-Leninist). All National Conference, 11th, Kanpur, 1971
- Reports & the Thesis on International Situations: Inevitability of the Third World War and Our Task. Revolutionary Socialist Party of India (Marxist-Leninist). All National Conference, 11th, Kanpur, 1971
