= Pahukata =

- Village
- Location in Assam, India Pahukata (India)
- Coordinates: 26.84985°N 92.56785°E
- Country: India
- State: Assam
- District: Sonitpur

Languages
  - Official: Assamese
- Time zone: UTC+5:30 (IST)
- PIN: 784178
- Vehicle registration: AS

Pahukata is a village located in the Kalabari Area of Sonitpur District in Assam. It falls under the Gohpur Sub-Division. The village is divided into two parts by the river Mornoi. The northern part is named Uttar-Pahukata (North-Pahukata), and the southern part is called the Dakshin-Pahukata (Southern-Pahukata). Due to the increase in population, both parts of Pahukata now introduce themselves as different villages.

== History ==
Pahukata was a dense forest with many wild animals. During olden times, the King of Darrang district came to Kalabari and stayed in some area nearby Pahukata. The guards of the king went to the dense forest to catch deer (Pahu means deer in Assamese) and brought the deer to the village for cutting (Kata means cutting in Assamese). Hence, Pahukata got its name.

== Uttar-Pahukata ==
Uttar-Pahukata is the northern part of the Village. Towards its east is the Gagol-gaon, to its west is the Mikirborachuck, towards the north is the Barbheti and to its south lies the Mornoi river, which separate the Dakshin-Pahukata from Uttar-Pahukata. The eastern part of the village is called the Ujjai-Chuck(means up-hill-region), which is the dwelling place for Bhuyan and Rajkhowa family, whereas the western part is called the Bhatiyai-Chuck (Means down-hill-region) is mostly dominated by the Hazarika family. Because of this some people prefer to say Hazarika-chuck to Bhatiyai-Chuck. For any religious or social gathering all the people of the village meet at the only Namghar called the Pahukata Namghar, which is situated in the middle of the village. The village also has a Lower Primary school near to the Hazarika-chuck called the Pahukata Parthamik Vidyalaya. All the small children get their primary education from this school. The water supply of the Public health is located towards the extreme west of Uttar-Pahukata, after which the Mikirborachuck village starts.

== Dakshin Pahukata ==
Dakshin Pahukata is located towards the southern part of the village. It has Kasturba High School in the midst of the village.
