= Kakati =

Kakati is a surname, commonly used in India. Notable people with the surname include:

- Banikanta Kakati (1894–1952), Indian linguist, literary figure, critic and scholar in Assamese language
- Gyanada Kakati (1932–2025), Indian actress and singer
- Kashmira Kakati, Indian wildlife biologist and environmental activist
- Mukunda Kakati (1919–1942), Indian revolutionary
- Reema Kagti, born Reema Kakati, Indian film director and screenwriter
- Robin Kakati (1909–1996), Indian politician
- Satish Chandra Kakati (1912–2006), Indian journalist, writer, and editor

== See also ==
- Garuda's abduction of Queen Kakati, a Buddhist tale about the former lives of the Buddha
