= Swahid Kanaklata Barua State University =

- Location: Gohpur, Assam, Biswanath district, India

Swahid Kanaklata Barua State University is a public technical and vocational university in Gohpur, Biswanath district, Assam India.

== University history ==
The Government of Assam introduced the Swahid Kanaklata Barua State University Bill, 2024 to establish a dedicated technical and vocational university in Gohpur. The bill was passed in 2024 with the objective of expanding access to skill-oriented higher education in the state. Following its approval, the Assam Cabinet allocated ₹400 crore for developing the campus at Bholaguri Tea Estate in Biswanath district.Finance Minister Nirmala Sitharaman laid the foundation stone in 2025, ma rking the formal beginning of construction.The university was named to honour Kanaklata Barua, a young Assamese freedom fighter who died in the Quit India Movement.
