= Utpal Borah =

Indian politician

Member of Assam Legislative Assembly
- In office 2016–Incumbent
- Preceded by: Monika Bora
- Constituency: Gohpur

Personal details
- Born: Utpal Borah; 1 September 1966 (age 60) Kalabari, Gohpur
- Party: Bharatiya Janata Party
- Spouse: Saraswati Borah (m. 1997)
- Parent: Late Mahendra Nath Borah(father) Late Gunada Borah(mother)
- Education: Jorhat Engineering College (B.E)
- Profession: Politician, engineer

Utpal Borah is a Bharatiya Janata Party politician from Assam, India. He has been elected in Assam Legislative Assembly election in 2016 from Gohpur constituency.

He is also selected as the BJP candidate for Assam Legislative Assembly election 2021 from Gohpur Constituency.
