= Pahukata Namghar =

- পহুকতা নামঘৰ

Religion
- Affiliation: Hinduism
- District: Sonitpur
- Deity: Bishnu and Shri Krishna
- Festival: Barshik Seva

Location
- Location: Village-Uttar Pahukata, PO-Kalabari, District-Sonitpur, Assam, PIN-784178
- State: Assam
- Country: India
- Interactive map of Pahukata Namghar
- Coordinates: 26.8802°N 93.7193°E

Architecture
- Type: Mixed
- Creator: Various
- Completed: 1954

Pahukata-Namghar is a temple situated in the middle of Uttar-Pahukata village, in the district of Sonitpur, Assam. The postal code of the place is 784178.

The namghar is surrounded by the Mornoi River on its north and the main road on its South. The Namghar has its Manikut in its eastern side.

== History ==
The Pahukata Namghar was established in the year 1936. The location of the then Namghar was near to the Uttar-Pahukata Lower Primary School(Uttar-Pahukata Prarthamik Vidyalaya), which was relocated to the present location in 1956 under the aegis of three village viz. Uttar-Pahukata, Dakshin Pahukata and Tihulabari.

== Specialty of Pahukata-Namghar ==
The people of Uttar-Pahukata meet in this place for all kind of gathering or social activities. The specialty of the Namghar is its Barshik-Sheva (the Annual-Festival), which is linked to the weather of the area. No matter what is the date or time of the Namghar's Barshik-Sheva, the place has received rain each and every time during the Prasad distribution since its establishment.
