= Kalabari =

Kalabari may refer to:

- Kalabari tribe, an ethnic group of the Niger Delta region of Nigeria
- Kalabari language, their language
- Kalabari Kingdom, a traditional state within Nigeria
- Kalabari, another name for the city of Calabar, Nigeria
- Kalabari (Assam), a locality in India
