= Mukunda Kakati =

Indian socialist revolutionary

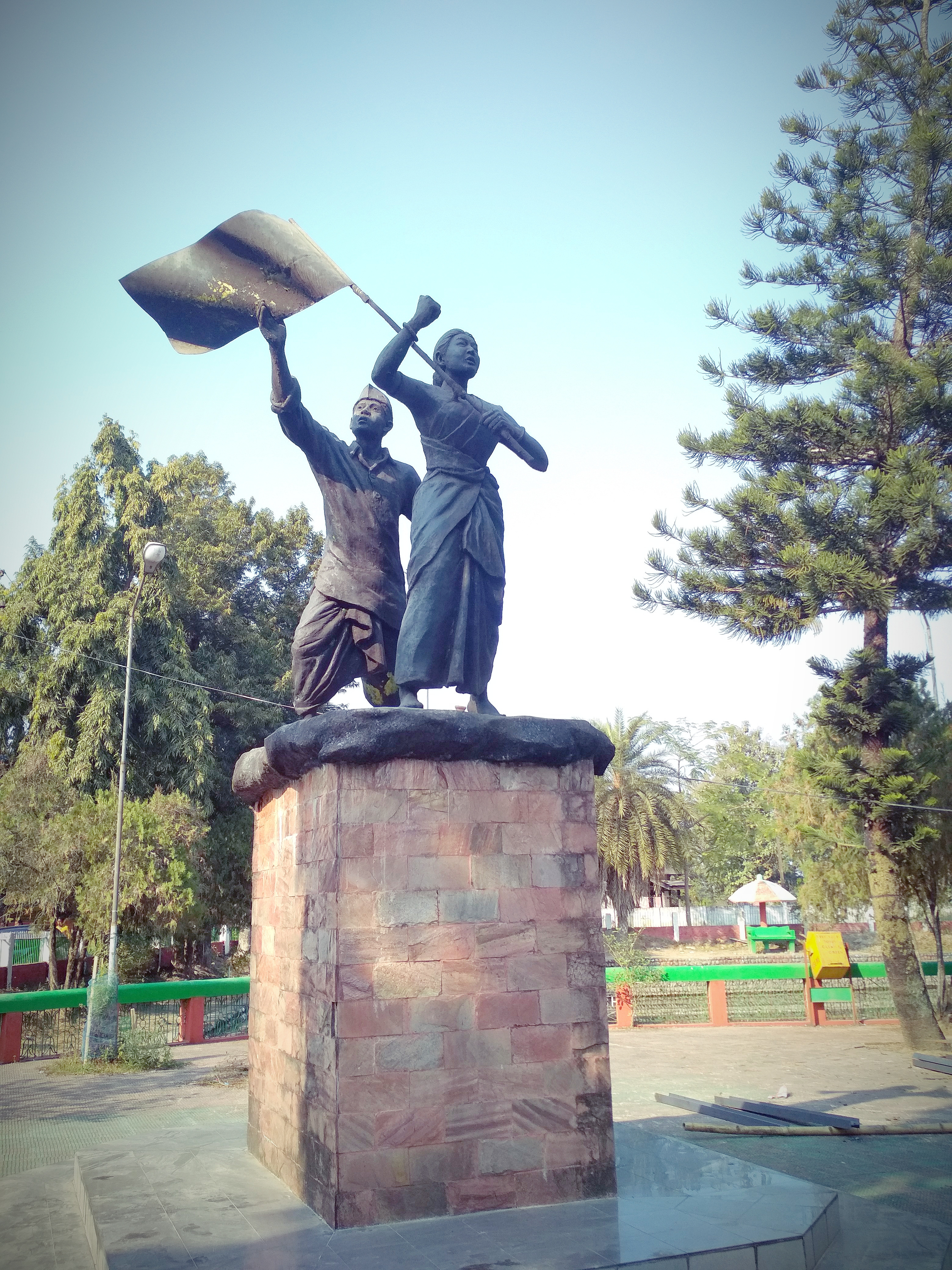
- Bronze statues of Swahid Kanaklata and Mukunda Kakati in front of Gohpur police station where they were shot dead
- Born: March 1919; Nalbari, Kamrup (British India)
- Died: 20 September, 1942; Gohpur
- Cause of death: Shot by police
- Other names: Mukund
- Movement: Indian independence movement

Mukunda Kakati (1919-1942) was an Indian revolutionary who participated Mahatma Gandhi's Quit India Movement and was shot dead by officers of the Indian Imperial Police in Gohpur Police Station on 20 September 1942.

== Death ==
On 20 September 1942, the Mrityu Bahini, a death squad comprising groups of youth from the Gohpur sub-division of Assam, decided that independence activist Kanaklata Barua would hoist the nationalist flag at the local police station. Barua led a procession of unarmed villagers to do so. The police under Rebati Mahan Som, the officer in charge of the police station, warned the procession of dire consequences if they proceeded with their plan. Even after the warning, the procession continued marching ahead when the police fired upon the procession. Barua was shot and the flag she was carrying with her was taken up by Mukunda Kakoti who too was shot at. Both Barua and Kakoti were killed in the police action.

== Commemoration ==
In Gohpur, there is a tank named Borpukhuri which was named for Mukunda Kakati and Kanaklata Baruah.

In 1994, the Assam State Government named Nalbari Civil Hospital as 'Swahid Mukunda Kakati Civil Hospital' honouring Mukunda Kakati's sacrifice.
