= Bhogeswari Phukanani =

Indian independence movement activist

Shaheed Bhogeswari Phukanani
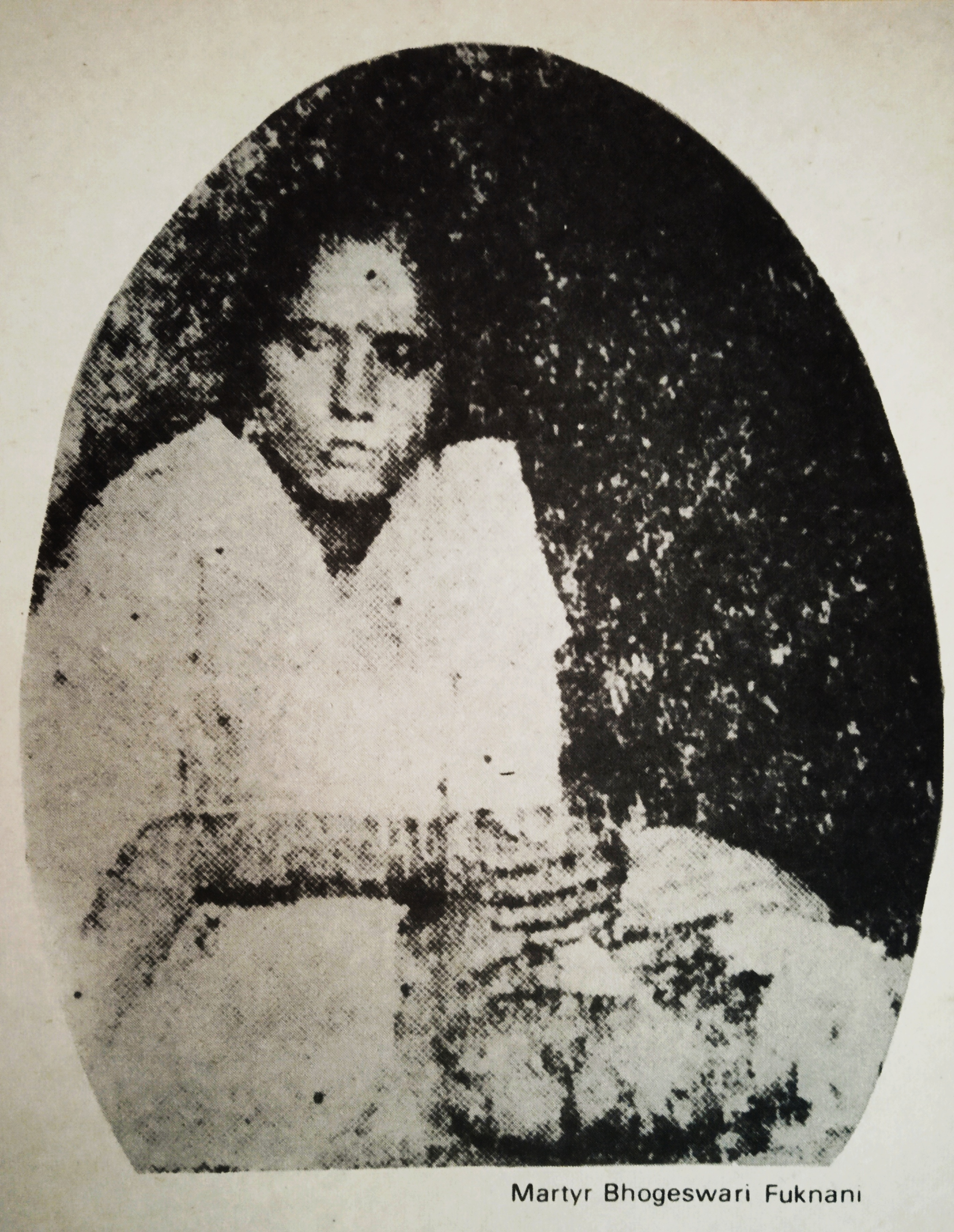
- Born: c. 1885; Nagaon district, Assam, British India
- Died: 20 or 21 September 1942; Berhampur, Nagaon, Assam, British India
- Cause of death: gunshot wound
- Children: 8

Shaheed (martyr) Bhogeshwari Phukanani (1885 – 20 or 21 September 1942) was an Indian independence movement activist during the British Raj and played a part in the Indian independence struggle.

== Indian independence movement ==
Phukanani was born in Nagaon district, Assam, in 1885. She was married to Bhogeswar Phukan and the couple had two daughters and six sons. Even though she was a mother of eight and a housewife, Phukanani played an important role in the Quit India Movement. Phukanani was active in the Berhampur, Babajia and Barpujia areas in the Nagaon district of Assam and helped set up offices for the Indian National Congress. In 1930 Phukanani took part in a nonviolent march as an act of civil disobedience against the British authorities and was arrested for picketing.

== Death ==
During the Indian independence movement, Phukanani would often take part in nonviolent protest marches against the British Raj or British rule. In 1942 the Berhampur Indian National Congress office was seized by the British authorities and closed. Phukanani and her sons took part in that protest march and a successful attempt was made to reopen the Congress office. A celebration of the office's reopening was held on 18 September 1942, or perhaps two days later. The British sent a large force to reclose the Congress office, and possibly to have it destroyed.

There are at least two accounts of the events surrounding Phukanani's death. According to one, Phukanani and her daughter named Ratnamala were leading a large group of people, including many from the surrounding villages, and were carrying the Indian national flag and shouting Vande Mataram and freedom slogans. The police resisted the group with force and in the ensuing scuffle a British army captain named "Finish" grabbed the national flag from Ratnamala, who fell to the ground. Seeing this as an insult to the Indian national flag, Phukanani struck the captain with the pole of a flag that she herself was carrying. According to another, Phukanani was not present when the British arrived and demanded that the crowd demolish the Congress office, but when she came she saw a British official named "Finch" pointing a gun at her son and other protesters. Rushing forward, she struck the official with a flag pole. In these accounts, the man she struck—"Finch" or "Finish"—then shot her. Phukanani succumbed to the gunshot wound either that day (20 September 1942), or three days after an 18 September 1942 injury.

After India gained its independence in 1947 a hospital and an indoor stadium were named after her. The hospital was established in 1854 at Nagaon, Assam, by an American Baptist missionary Miles Bronsonis and was later renamed Bhogeswari Phukanani Civil Hospital. The indoor stadium named after her is situated at Guwahati in Assam.
