= Ganesh Kutum =

Indian politician

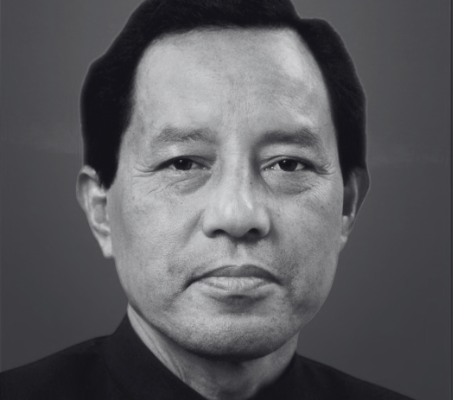

15th Speaker of Assam Legislative Assembly
- In office 12 June 1996 – 24 May 2001
- Preceded by: Debesh Chandra Chakravorty
- Succeeded by: Prithibi Majhi

Member Assam Legislative Assembly
- In office 9 January 1986 – 27 July 1991
- Preceded by: Ram Chandra Sarmah
- Succeeded by: Kosheswar Barua
- Constituency: Gohpur
- Majority: Asom Gana Parishad

Member Assam Legislative Assembly
- In office 12 June 1996 – 24 May 2001
- Preceded by: Kosheswar Barua
- Succeeded by: Ripun Bora
- Constituency: Gohpur
- Majority: Indian National Congress

Personal details
- Born: 1 April 1948
- Died: 17 September 2008 (aged 60) Guwahati, Assam
- Party: Asom Gana Parishad; Asom Gana Parishad (Progressive)
- Children: Geeta Kutum, Jonali kutum, Shankar Jyoti Kutum, Menaka Kutum, Tulika Kutum, Alaka Kutum
- Parent(s): Late Numalia Gam Kutum; Late Magoni Gam
- Education: M.A. (Political Science) Gauhati University; BA (Honours) North Lakhimpur College; Higher Secondary Cotton College; Kalahari High School; Kutumgaon Primary School
- Occupation: Politician

Ganesh Kutum (1 April 1948 - 17 September 2008) was an Asom Gana Parishad politician from Assam, India.

He was the twelfth Speaker of the Assam Legislative Assembly from June 1996 to May 2001. He was elected in Assam Legislative Assembly election in 1985 and 1996 from Gohpur constituency.

== Early life and education ==
Ganesh Kutum was born on 1 April 1948 to Numalia Gam Kutum and Magoni Gam. He earned an Bachelor of Arts (Hons ) from North Lakhimpur College and an Master of Arts in Political Science from Guwahati University.
