= 1942 Adas shooting =

Shooting in India

- Part of Quit India movement
- Date: 18 August 1942
- Location: Adas, Anand district, Gujarat, India; 22.4865136°N 73.0343862°E

Parties
Quit India movement activists	Indian Imperial Police

Number
34	7

Casualties
- Deaths: 6
- Injuries: 15
- Location of memorial

On 18 August 1942, six people died and many more wounded during the Quit India movement at the Adas railway station in Adas village in Kaira district in Bombay Presidency, British India (now in Anand district in Gujarat, India).

== Incident ==
On 18 August 1942, on the 11th day of the Quit India movement, 34 youth from Baroda (now Vadodara) were travelling to villages to distribute Indian National Congress propaganda leaflets. They travelled to Bajva, Navli and Vadod villages from where they reached the Adas railway station to return Baroda. When they reached the station, the police fired on them without warning.

Ratibhai Gordhanbhai Patel, Raman Purushottambhai Patel and Mohan Maganlal Patel died on the spot while Tulsi S. Modi and Manibhai P. Shah died of wounds in Anand next day. Four more were severely injured and 11 were suffered minor injuries.

== Memorial ==
A memorial pillar was erected by Anand-Kheda District National Committee at the cost of ₹20,000. The pillar depicts a scene of shooting. On 18 August every year, the Martyr Memory Day is celebrated.
