= Kanaklata Barua =

Indian freedom fighter

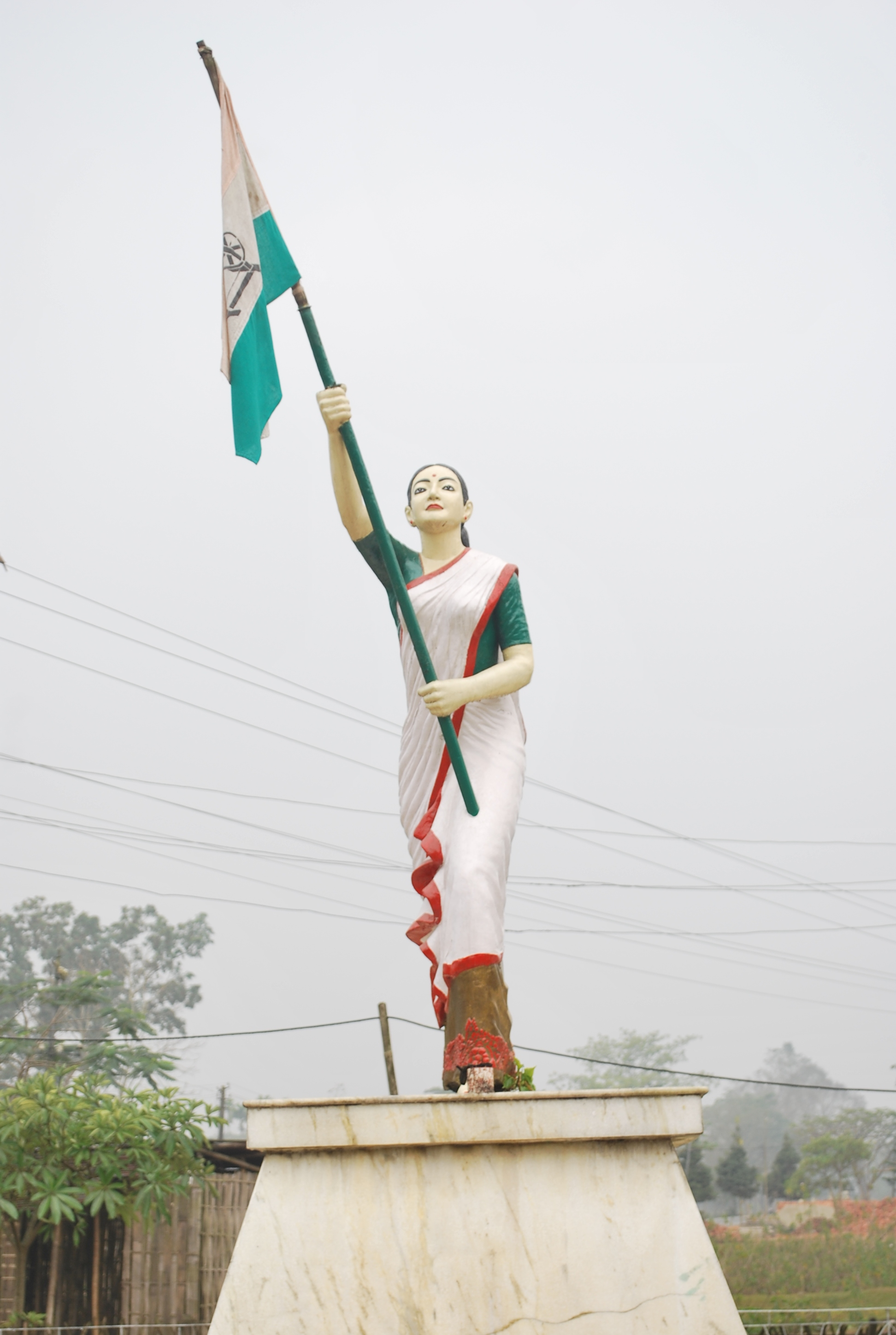
- Kanaklata Barua’s sculpture at Borngabari, Gohpur
- Born: 22 December 1924; Borangabari, Gohpur, Darrang district, British India
- Died: 20 September 1942 (aged 17); Borangabari, Gohpur
- Movement: Indian Independence movement

Kanaklata Barua (22 December 1924 – 20 September 1942), also called Birangana and Shaheed (martyr), was an Indian independence activist who was shot dead by the Indian Imperial Police of the British Raj while leading a procession bearing the National Flag during the Quit India Movement of 1942.

== Formative Years ==
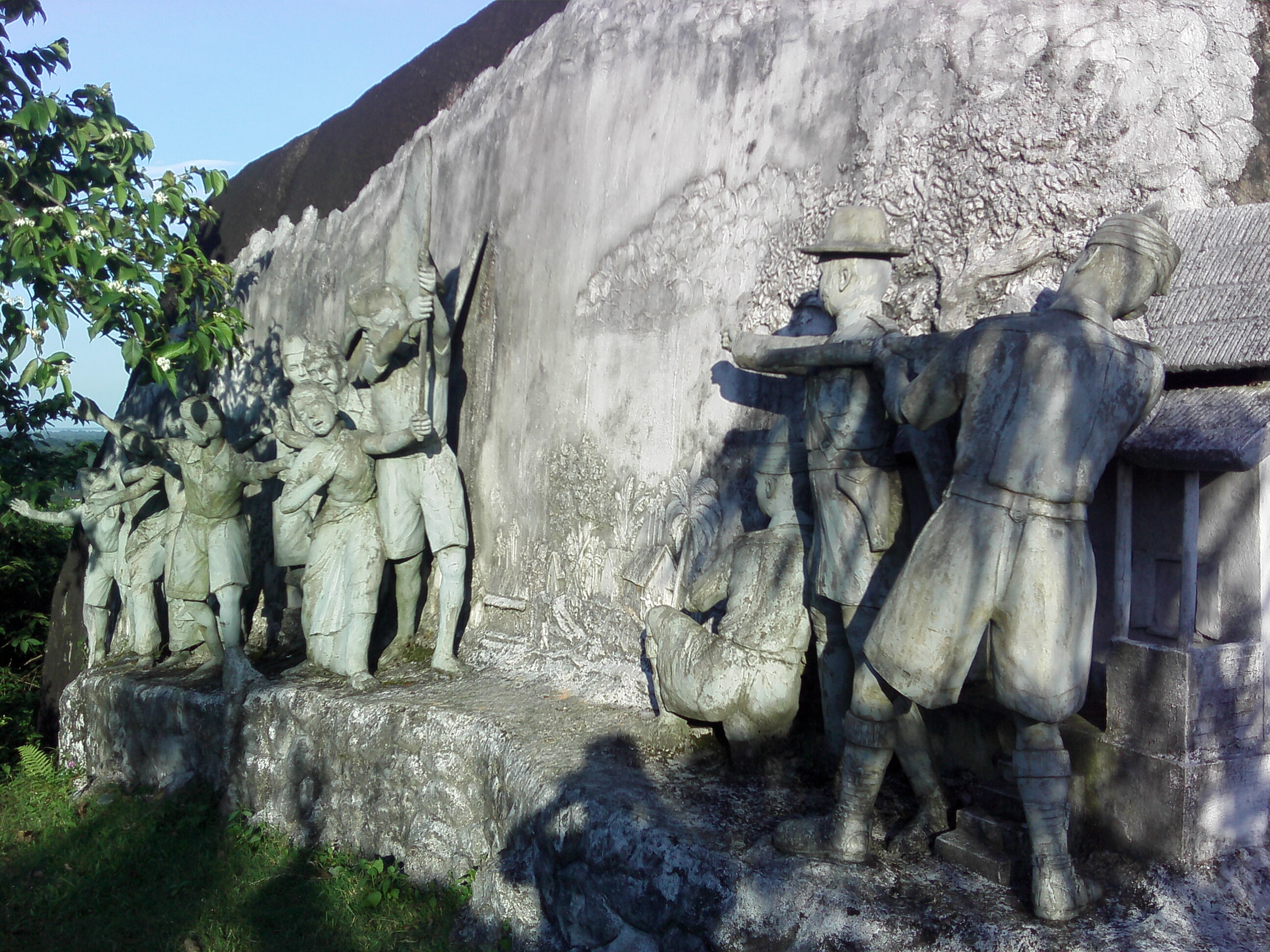
A sculpture at Kanaklata Udyan or Rock Garden at Tezpur, Assam, describing the incident.

She was born on 22 December 1924. Barua was born in the Borangabari village of the undivided Darrang district of Assam as the daughter of Krishna Kanta and Karneshwari Barua. Her grandfather Ghana Kanta Barua was a famous hunter in Darrang. Her ancestors were from the Dolakasharia Barua kingdom (Chutia vassal chiefdom) of the erstwhile Ahom state who relinquished the Dolakasharia title and continued retaining the Barua title. Her mother died when she was only five and her father, who remarried, died when she reached thirteen. She went to school till class three but then dropped out to take care of her younger siblings.

== Independence activism ==
During the Quit India Movement Barua joined the Mrityu Bahini, a death squad comprising groups of youth from the Gohpur sub-division of Assam. On 20 September 1942, the Bahini decided she would hoist the nationalist flag at the local police station. Barua led a procession of unarmed villagers to do so. The police under Rebati Mahan Som, the officer in charge of the police station, warned the procession of dire consequences if they proceeded with their plan. Even after the warning, the procession continued marching ahead when the police fired upon the procession. Barua was shot and the flag she was carrying with her was taken up by Mukunda Kakoti who too was shot at. Both Barua and Kakoti were killed in the police action. Barua was 17 years old at the time of her death.

== Commemoration ==
The Fast Patrol Vessel ICGS Kanak Lata Barua of the Indian Coast Guard, commissioned in 1997, is named after Barua. A life-size statue of her was unveiled at Gauripur in 2011. Her passionate speech before her death, remains a source of inspiration for many.

== Popular culture ==
Her story was retold in director Chandra Mudoi's film, Epaah Phulil Epaah Xoril. The Hindi version of the movie, titled Purab Ki Awaz, was also released to reach a wider audience.

== See also ==
- Pushpalata Das
