= Quit India Movement =

1942-45 Indian independence movement against British rule

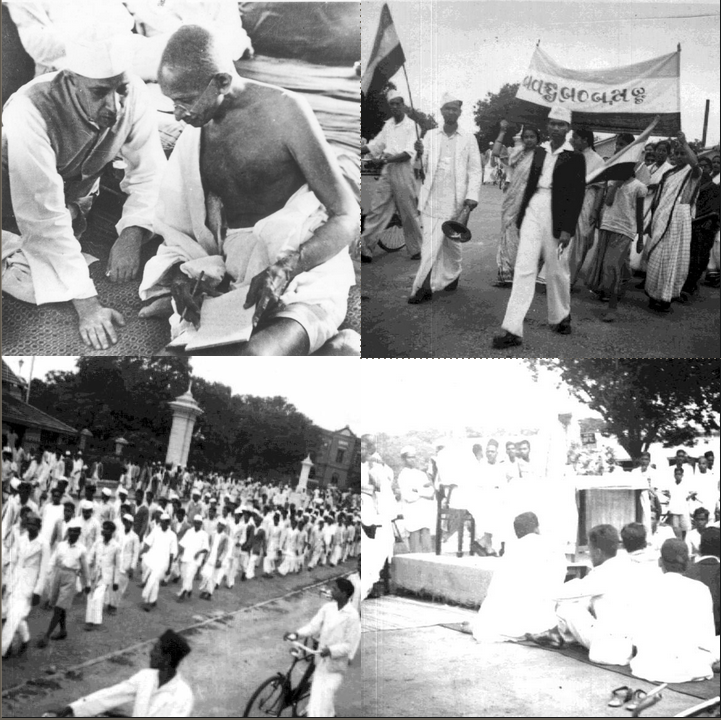
- First: Gandhi discusses the movement with Nehru; Second: Procession at Bangalore by Indian National Congress; Third: Another Procession at Bangalore by Indian National Congress. Fourth: Public lecture at Basavanagudi, Bangalore organised by Indian National Congress.
- Date: 1942–1945
- Location: South Asia

Parties
Indian nationalists: Indian National Congress; Khudai Khidmatgar; Bolshevik–Leninist Party of India, Ceylon and Burma	United Kingdom: British Raj; Supported by: All-India Muslim League; Hindu Mahasabha; Communist Party of India

Lead figures
Mahatma Gandhi; Jawaharlal Nehru; Abdul Ghaffar Khan	Winston Churchill; Lord Linlithgow Muhammad Ali Jinnah; Vinayak Damodar Savarkar; Puran Chand Joshi

Casualties and losses
British estimates: 1,028 killed 3125 wounded Over 100,000 arrested Congress estimates: 4,000–10,000 killed	63 officers killed 2,000 officers wounded 200 officers fled or defected

The Quit India Movement was a political campaign launched at the Bombay session of the All India Congress Committee by Mahatma Gandhi on 8 August 1942, during World War II, demanding an end to British rule in India. After Britain failed to secure Indian support for the British war effort with the Cripps Mission, Gandhi made a call to Do or Die in his Quit India speech delivered in Bombay on 8 August 1942 at the Gowalia Tank Maidan. Viceroy Linlithgow described the movement as "by far the most serious rebellion since 1857".

The All India Congress Committee launched a mass protest demanding what Gandhi called "An Orderly British Withdrawal" from India. Even though it was at war, Britain was prepared to act. Almost the entire leadership of the Indian National Congress was imprisoned without trial within hours of Gandhi's speech. Most spent the rest of the war in prison and out of contact with the masses. The British had the support of the Viceroy's Council, of the All India Muslim League, the Hindu Mahasabha, the princely states, the Indian Imperial Police, the British Indian Army, and the Indian Civil Service. Many Indian businessmen profiting from heavy wartime spending did not support the Quit India Movement. The major outside support came from the Americans, as President Franklin D. Roosevelt pressured Prime Minister Winston Churchill to give in to some of the Indian demands.

The movement included anti-British boycotts and rejection of transactions involving the colonial government. Various violent incidents took place around the country against British rule, and the colonial government arrested tens of thousands of leaders, keeping them imprisoned until 1945. Ultimately, the British realised that India was ungovernable in the long run, and the issue for the postwar era became how to exit gracefully and peacefully. The movement ended in 1945 with the release of all jailed nationalists. Prominent independence activists who died during the movement include Mukunda Kakati, Matangini Hazra, Kanaklata Barua, Kushal Konwar, Bhogeswari Phukanani and others. In 1992, the Reserve Bank of India issued a 1 rupee commemorative coin to mark the Golden Jubilee of the Quit India Movement.

== World War II and Indian involvement ==
In 1939, Indian nationalists were angry that British Governor-General of India, Lord Linlithgow, brought India into the war without consultation with them. The Muslim League supported the war, but Congress was divided.

At the outbreak of war, the Congress Party had passed a resolution during the Wardha meeting of the working committee in September 1939, conditionally supporting the fight against the Axis, but were rebuffed when they asked for independence in return:

If the war is to defend the status quo of imperialist possessions and colonies, of vested interest and privilege, then India can have nothing to do with it. If, however, the issue is democracy and world order based on democracy, then India is intensely interested in it... If Great Britain fights for the maintenance and expansion of democracy, then she must necessarily end imperialism in her possessions and establish full democracy in India, and the Indian people have the right to self-determination... A free democratic India will gladly associate herself with other free nations for mutual defence against aggression and for economic co-operation.

Gandhi had not supported this initiative, as he could not reconcile an endorsement for war (he was a committed believer in non-violent resistance, used in the Indian Independence Movement and proposed even against Adolf Hitler, Benito Mussolini, and Hideki Tojo). However, at the height of the Battle of Britain, Gandhi had stated his support for the fight against racism and of the British war effort, stating he did not seek to raise an independent India from the ashes of Britain. However, opinions remained divided. The long-term British policy of limiting investment in India and using the country as a market and source of revenue had left the Indian Army relatively weak and poorly armed and trained and forced the British to become net contributors to India's budget, while taxes were sharply increased and the general level of prices doubled: although many Indian businesses benefited from increased war production, in general business "felt rebuffed by the government" and in particular the refusal of the British Raj to give Indians a greater role in organising and mobilising the economy for wartime production.

Subash Chandra Bose remarked that a "new chapter in Indian freedom struggle began with the Quit India Movement". After the onset of the world war, Bose had organised the Indian Legion in Germany, reorganised the Indian National Army with Japanese assistance and, soliciting help from the Axis powers, conducted a guerrilla war against the British authorities.

Viceroy Linlithgow remarked the movement to be "by far the most serious rebellion since 1857". In his telegram to Winston Churchill on 31 August he noted:

I am engaged here in meeting by far the most serious rebellion since that of 1857, the gravity and extent of which we have so far concealed from the world for reasons of military security. Mob violence remains rampant over large tracts of the countryside and I am by no means confident that we may not see in September a formidable attempt to renew this widespread sabotage of our war effort. The lives of Europeans in outlying places are in jeopardy.

When American Republican presidential candidate Wendell Willkie and YMCA official Sherwood Eddy planned to meet Gandhi, Linlithgow deemed it to be American interference in "our own business" and asked Churchill to dissuade them. The Indian nationalists knew that the United States strongly supported Indian independence, in principle, and believed the U.S. was an ally. However, after Churchill threatened to resign if pushed too hard, the U.S. quietly supported him while bombarding Indians with propaganda designed to strengthen public support of the war effort. The poorly run American operation annoyed the Indians.

=== Cripps mission ===
In March 1942, faced with a dissatisfied sub-continent only reluctantly participating in the war and deterioration in the war situation in Europe and with growing dissatisfaction among Indian troops and among the civilian population in the sub-continent, the British government sent a delegation to India under Stafford Cripps, the Leader of the House of Commons, in what came to be known as the Cripps Mission. The purpose of the mission was to negotiate with the Indian National Congress a deal to obtain total co-operation during the war, in return for devolution and distribution of power from the crown and the Viceroy to an elected Indian legislature. The talks failed, as they did not address the key demand of a timetable of self-government and of the powers to be relinquished, essentially making an offer of limited dominion-status that was unacceptable to the Indian movement.

=== Factors contributing to the movement's launch ===
In 1939, with the outbreak of war between Germany and Britain, India became a party to the war by being a constituent component of the British Empire. Had enough Indian states agreed to form a Federal Government under the terms of the 1935 Act, then the Viceroy could not have acted unilaterally in declaring war on India's behalf. Following this declaration, the Congress Working Committee at its meeting on 10 October 1939, passed a resolution condemning the aggressive activities of the Germans. At the same time, the resolution also stated that India could not associate herself with war unless it was consulted first. Responding to this declaration, the Viceroy issued a statement on 17 October wherein he claimed that Britain was waging a war driven with the intention of strengthening peace in the world. He also stated that after the war the government would initiate modifications in the Act of 1935, in accordance with the desires of the Indians.

Gandhi's reaction to this statement was; "the old policy of divide and rule is to continue. Congress has asked for bread and it has got stone." According to the instructions issued by High Command, the Congress ministers were directed to resign immediately. Congress ministers from eight provinces resigned following the instructions. The resignation of the ministers was an occasion of great joy and rejoicing for the leader of the Muslim League, Muhammad Ali Jinnah. He called the date i.e. 22 December 1939 The Day of Deliverance. Gandhi urged Jinnah against the celebration of this day, however, it was futile. At the Muslim League Lahore Session held in March 1940, Jinnah declared in his presidential address that the Muslims of the country wanted a separate electorate, Pakistan.

Meanwhile, crucial political events took place in England. Chamberlain was succeeded by Churchill as prime minister. This meant that the Marquis of Zetland who had piloted the 1935 Act, much to Churchill's chagrin, resigned as Secretary of State for India. In order to pacify the Indians in the circumstance of the worsening war situation, the Conservatives were forced to concede some of the demands made by the Indians. On 8 August, the Viceroy issued a statement that has come to be referred to as the "August Offer". However, Congress rejected the offer followed by the Muslim League.

In the context of the widespread dissatisfaction that prevailed over the rejection of the demands made by the Congress, at the meeting of the Congress Working Committee in Wardha, Gandhi revealed his plan to launch individual civil disobedience. Once again, the weapon of satyagraha found popular acceptance as the best means to wage a crusade against the British. It was widely used as a mark of protest against the unwavering stance assumed by the British. Vinoba Bhave, a follower of Gandhi, was selected by him to initiate the movement. Anti-war speeches ricocheted in all corners of the country, with the satyagrahis earnestly appealing to the people of the nation not to support the government in its war endeavours. The consequence of this satyagrahi campaign was the arrest of almost fourteen thousand satyagrahis. On 3 December 1941, the Viceroy ordered the acquittal of all the satyagrahis. In Europe the war situation became more critical with the Japanese attack on Pearl Harbor and the Congress realised the necessity for appraising their program. Subsequently, the movement was withdrawn.

Cripps' mission of March 1942 and its failure also played an important role in Gandhi's call for The Quit India Movement. In order to end the deadlock on 22 March 1942, the British government sent Sir Stafford Cripps to talk terms with the Indian political parties and secure their support in Britain's war efforts. A draft declaration of the British Government was presented, which included terms like the establishment of Dominion, the establishment of a Constituent Assembly, and right of the provinces to make separate constitutions. However, these were to be only implemented after the cessation of the World War II. According to Congress, this declaration offered India an only promise that was to be fulfilled in the future. Commenting on this Gandhi said, "It is a post-dated cheque on a crashing bank." Other factors that contributed were the threat of Japanese invasion of India and the realisation of the national leaders of the incapacity of the British to defend India.

== Resolution for immediate independence ==
The Congress Working Committee meeting at Wardha (14 July 1942) adopted a resolution demanding complete independence from the British government. The draft proposed massive civil disobedience if the British did not accede to the demands. It was passed at Bombay

However, it proved to be controversial within the party. A prominent Congress national leader, Chakravarti Rajgopalachari, quit the Congress over this decision, and so did some local and regional level organisers. Jawaharlal Nehru and Maulana Azad were apprehensive and critical of the call, but backed it and stuck with Gandhi's leadership until the end. Sardar Vallabhbhai Patel, Rajendra Prasad and Anugrah Narayan Sinha openly and enthusiastically supported such a disobedience movement, as did many veteran Gandhians and socialists like Asoka Mehta and Jayaprakash Narayan.

Allama Mashriqi, head of the Khaksar Tehrik, was called by Jawaharlal Nehru to join the Quit India Movement. Mashriqi was apprehensive of its outcome and did not agree with the Congress Working Committee's resolution. On 28 July 1942, Allama Mashriqi sent the following telegram to Maulana Abul Kalam Azad, Khan Abdul Ghaffar Khan, Mohandas Gandhi, C. Rajagopalachari, Jawaharlal Nehru, Rajendra Prasad and Pattabhi Sitaramayya. He also sent a copy to Bulusu Sambamurti (former Speaker of the Madras Assembly). The telegram was published in the press, and stated:

I am in receipt of Pandit Jawaharlal Nehru's letter of 8 July. My honest opinion is that Civil Disobedience Movement is a little pre-mature. The Congress should first concede openheartedly and with handshake to Muslim League the theoretical Pakistan, and thereafter all parties unitedly make demand of Quit India. If the British refuse, start total disobedience.

The resolution said:

The committee, therefore, resolves to sanction for the vindication of India's inalienable right to freedom and independence, the starting of a mass struggle on non-violent lines on the widest possible scale, so that the country might utilise all the non-violent strength it has gathered during the last 22 years of peaceful struggle... they [the people] must remember that non-violence is the basis of the movement.

== Guidelines ==
The guidelines of the movement that prevailed throughout the movement included disobedience of law, general strike among students, general strike amongst labour, formations of free Government, breaking of communications, refusal to pay taxes and others.

On 8 November 1942, Congress told people to perform ten duties 'without any risk':

1. No transaction with any business either with the Britishers or their Government
2. Every home and window exhibit tricoloured flag
3. Do not see movies because this money "goes to the tyrant Government"
4. Do not enter the Courts
5. Do not purchase the foreign goods
6. Withdrawal of your money from the Government Banks
7. Boycott the servants of the British Government
8. Do not transact any business for which you are asked to go to court
9. Leave the cities and go to villages
10. Let the grain and other things remain with the peasant.

== Opposition to the Quit India Movement ==
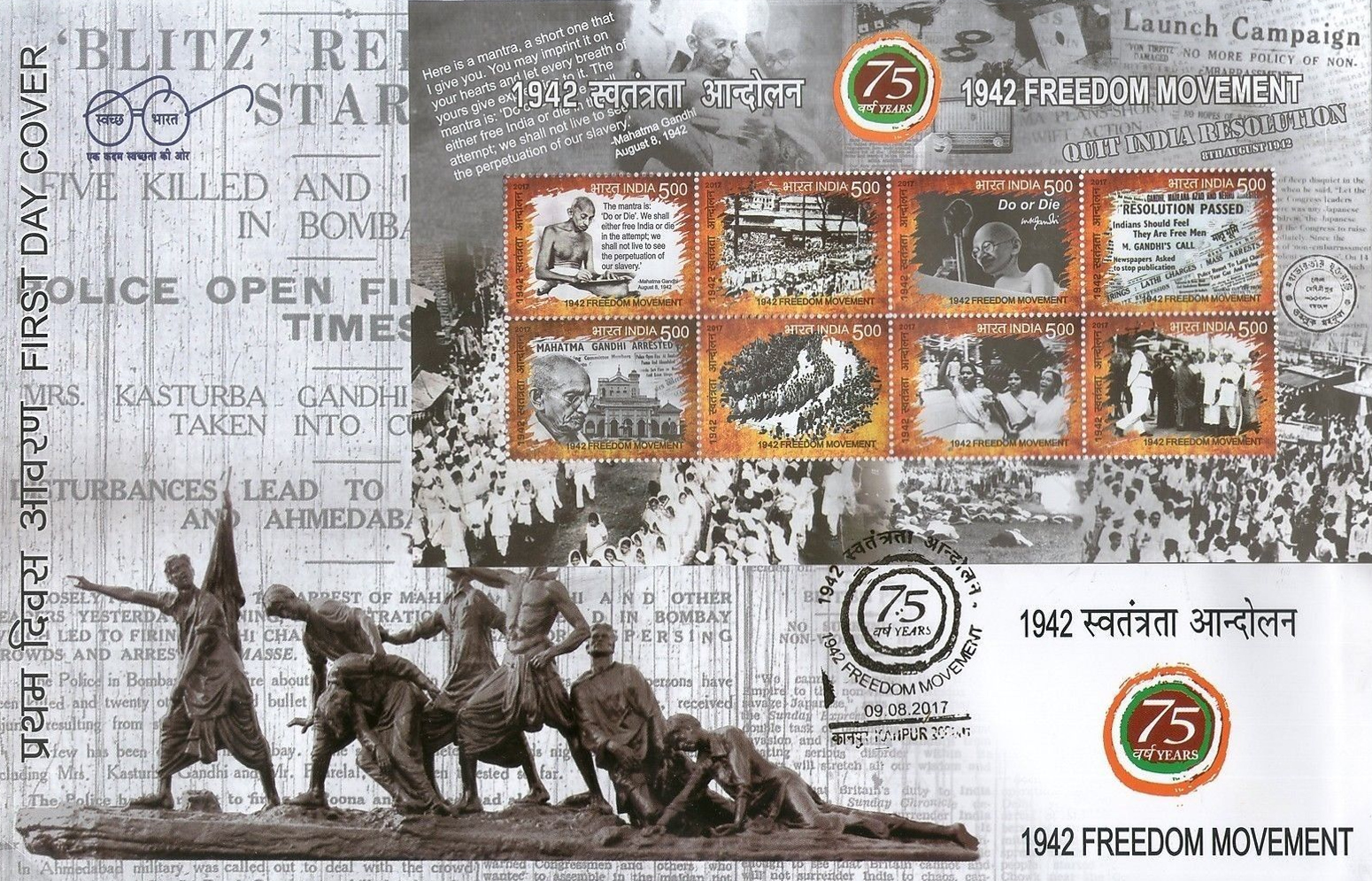
A 2017 stamp sheet dedicated to the 75th anniversary of the Quit India Movement. It features the Martyr's Memorial Patna (bottom-left), Gandhi delivering his "Do or Die" speech on 8 August 1942 (3rd stamp), and a part of it: "The mantra is 'Do or Die'. We shall either free India or die in the attempt; we shall not live to see the perpetuation of our slavery." (1st stamp).

Several political groups active during the Indian Independence Movement were opposed to the Quit India Movement. These included the Muslim League, the Hindu Mahasabha and princely states as below:

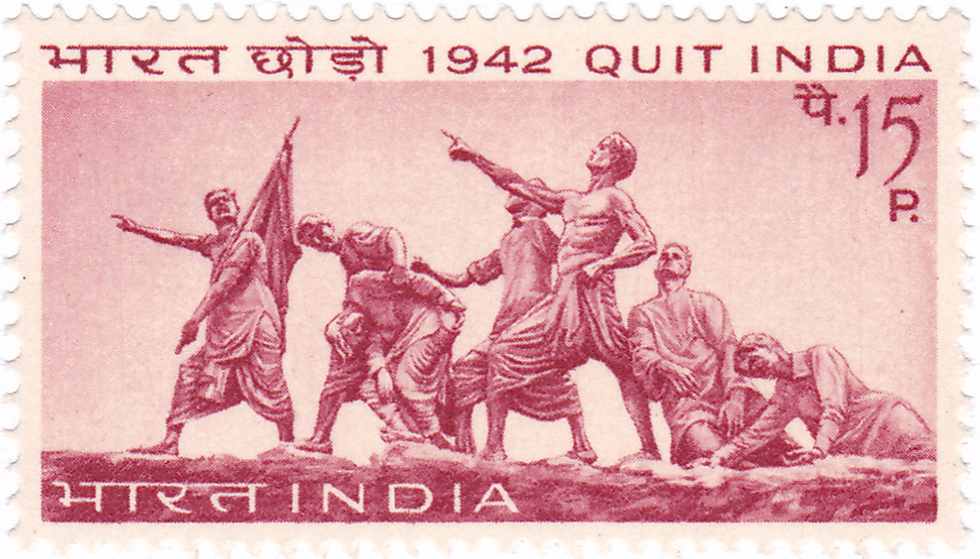
25th Anniversary of Quit India Movement postage stamp, 1967

=== Hindu Mahasabha ===
Hindu nationalist parties like the Hindu Mahasabha openly opposed the call for the Quit India Movement and boycotted it officially. Vinayak Damodar Savarkar, the president of the Hindu Mahasabha at that time, even went to the extent of writing a letter titled Stick to your Posts, in which he instructed Hindu Sabhaites who happened to be "members of municipalities, local bodies, legislatures or those serving in the army... to stick to their posts" across the country, and not to join the Quit India Movement at any cost. But later after requests and persuasions and realising the importance of the bigger role of Indian independence he chose to join the Indian independence movement.

Following the Hindu Mahasabha's official decision to boycott the Quit India movement, Syama Prasad Mukherjee, leader of the Hindu Mahasabha in Bengal, (which was a part of the ruling coalition in Bengal led by Krishak Praja Party of Fazlul Haq), wrote a letter to the British Government as to how they should respond, if the Congress gave a call to the British rulers to quit India. In this letter, dated 26 July 1942 he wrote:

Let me now refer to the situation that may be created in the province as a result of any widespread movement launched by the Congress. Anybody, who during the war, plans to stir up mass feeling, resulting internal disturbances or insecurity, must be resisted by any Government that may function for the time being.

In this way he managed to gain insights of the British government and effectively give information of the independence leaders. Mukherjee reiterated that the Fazlul Haq led Bengal Government, along with its alliance partner Hindu Mahasabha, would make every possible effort to defeat the Quit India Movement in the province of Bengal and made a concrete proposal as regards this:

The question is how to combat this movement (Quit India) in Bengal? The administration of the province should be carried on in such a manner that in spite of the best efforts of the Congress, this movement will fail to take root in the province. It should be possible for us, especially responsible Ministers, to be able to tell the public that the freedom for which the Congress has started the movement, already belongs to the representatives of the people. In some spheres it might be limited during the emergency. Indian have to trust the British, not for the sake for Britain, not for any advantage that the British might gain, but for the maintenance of the defence and freedom of the province itself. You, as Governor, will function as the constitutional head of the province and will be guided entirely on the advice of your Minister.

=== Others ===
The Muslim League and Muhammad Ali Jinnah opposed the movement. Jinnah supported British war effort in the world war.

The Communist Party of India opposed the Quit India movement and supported the British war effort after Soviet Union was under attack.

While the movement had impact on princely states, some princes opposed the movement and funded the opposition.

== Local violence and parallel governments ==
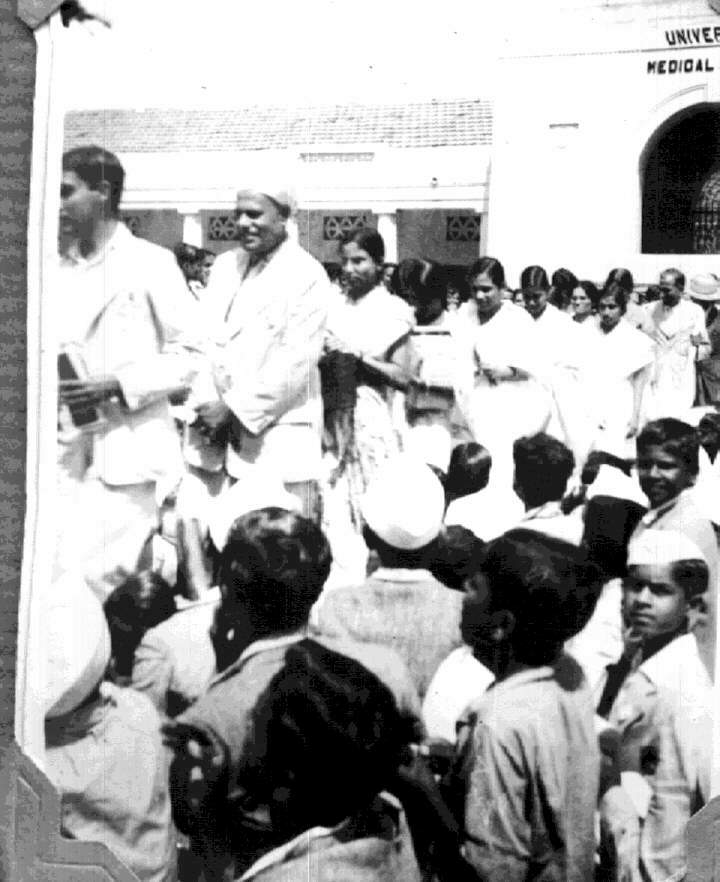
Picketing in front of Medical School at Bengaluru

The movement significantly impacted military preparations of British Empire during the World War II as 57 infantry battalions were used to quell protests for months when they had to be used in the war. Airfield construction was also delayed for four to six weeks.

According to John F. Riddick, from 9 August 1942 to 21 September 1942, the Quit India Movement:

...attacked 550 post offices, 250 railway stations, damaged many rail lines, destroyed 70 police stations, and burned or damaged 85 other government buildings. There were about 2,500 instances of telegraph wires being cut. The greatest level of violence occurred in Bihar. The Government of India deployed 57 battalions of British troops to restore order.

At the national level the lack of leadership meant the ability to galvanise rebellion was limited. The movement had a local impact in some areas. especially at Satara in Maharashtra, Talcher in Odisha, and Midnapore. In Tamluk and Contai subdivisions of Midnapore, the local populace were successful in establishing parallel government Tamluk National Government, which continued to function, until Gandhi personally requested the leaders to disband in 1944. A minor uprising took place in Ballia, now the easternmost district of Uttar Pradesh. People overthrew the district administration, broke open the jail, released the arrested Congress leaders and established their own independent rule. It took weeks before the British could reestablish their writ in the district. Of special importance in Saurashtra (in western Gujarat) was the role of the region's 'baharvatiya' tradition (i.e. going outside the law) which abetted the sabotage activities of the movement there. In Adas village in Kaira district, six people died and many more wounded in police shooting incident.

In rural west Bengal, the Quit India Movement was fuelled by peasants' resentment against the new war taxes and the forced rice exports. There was open resistance to the point of rebellion in 1942 until the great famine of 1943 suspended the movement in Bengal.

== Result of the movement ==
One of the important achievements of the movement was keeping the Congress party united through all the trials and tribulations that followed. The British, already alarmed by the advance of the Japanese army to the India-Burma border, responded by imprisoning Gandhi. All the members of the Party's Working Committee (national leadership) were imprisoned as well. Due to the arrest of major leaders, a young and until then relatively unknown Aruna Asaf Ali presided over the AICC session on 9 August and hoisted the flag; later the Congress party was banned. These actions only created sympathy for the cause among the population. Despite lack of direct leadership, large protests and demonstrations were held all over the country. Workers remained absent in large groups and strikes were called.

The demonstrations sometimes turned violent. At some places bombs exploded, government buildings were set on fire, electricity was cut, and transport and communication lines were severed.

Film footage of the days during Quit India Movement

The British swiftly responded with mass detentions. Over 100,000 arrests were made, mass fines were levied, and demonstrators were subjected to public flogging. Hundreds of civilians were killed in violence many shot by the police army. Many national leaders went underground and continued their struggle by broadcasting messages over the clandestine radio stations, distributing pamphlets and establishing parallel governments. The British sense of crisis was strong enough for a battleship to be specifically set aside to take Gandhi and the Congress leaders out of India, possibly to South Africa or Yemen. However, that step was ultimately not taken out of fear of intensifying the revolt. Leadership of the underground movement included names like Achyut Rao Patwardhan, Aruna Asaf Ali, Sucheta Kripalani, Daljit Singh and Nana Patil.

A sense that the movement could not gain prompt results had depressed many nationalists, while Jinnah and the Muslim League, as well as Congress opponents such as the Rashtriya Swayamsevak Sangh and the Hindu Mahasabha sought to gain political mileage, criticising Gandhi and the Congress Party.

The Congress leadership was cut off from the rest of the world for over three years. Gandhi's wife Kasturba Gandhi and his personal secretary Mahadev Desai died in months and Gandhi's health was failing, despite this Gandhi went on a 21-day fast and maintained his resolve to continuous resistance. Although the British released Gandhi on account of his health in 1944, he kept up the resistance, demanding the release of the Congress leadership.

In 1945, when World War II had almost come to an end, the Labour Party of the United Kingdom won elections with a promise to provide independence to India. The jailed political prisoners were released in 1945.

== See also ==
- Bhadant Anand Kausalyayan
- British Raj
- Government of Azad Hind
- Indian Independence Movement
- Indian nationalism
- Kallara-Pangode Struggle
- Non-Cooperation Movement
- Rahul Sankrityayan
- Congress Radio
