= Manikut =

In Assam, the term "Manikut or Monikut" holds a special connection to the religious and spiritual practices of the region, particularly within the context of Namghars. Namghars are traditional prayer halls or congregational centers where followers of the Ekasarana Dharma, a form of Vaishnavism, gather for prayers, devotional singing, and religious discourses.

The term "Monikut" or "Manikut" used in Assamese culture has its roots in the Assamese language. It is derived from two components: "Moni" and "Kut."

1. Moni: In Assamese, "Moni" refers to the mind or the inner consciousness. It signifies the realm of thoughts, emotions, and intellect.
2. Kut: "Kut" means a platform or a raised structure. In the context of Assamese culture, it typically refers to a designated area or space.

When these two components are combined, "Monikut" or "Manikut" signifies a platform or space associated with the mind or consciousness.

Manikut or Monikut (literally "the jewel hut") is an independent room located towards the eastern end of an Ekasarana Hindu prayer house (namghar). It is the place that represents the worshipful god, or a guru asana (the guru's seat). It is also called a bhajghar in western Assam, with its own roof. This is the only place in a namghar that is fully walled, with or without any windows. The manikut is a later addition attached to the basic namghar structure. The place does not house any idols as idolatry was denounced by Shankardev.

During religious gatherings and prayers in the Namghar, devotees gather around the "Manikut or Monikut" to participate in various spiritual activities. The "Manikut or Monikut" serves as a visual representation of the divine and is regarded as a sanctified space where devotees seek spiritual enlightenment, guidance, and solace.

The "Manikut or Monikut" holds immense significance in the Namghar, symbolizing the presence of divinity and acting as a focal point for spiritual communion. It represents the teachings of Lord Krishna and serves as a reminder of the path of righteousness, devotion, and love that followers of Ekasarana Dharma strive to follow.

== Guru asana ==
The Guru Āsana, literally the Seat of the Guru, is the place of sacred scripture. It is a seven-tiered, triangular, wooden throne adorned with tortoise-elephant-lion motifs and other decorative woodwork.

Within the Namghar, the Manikut or Monikut refers to the "central pedestal or platform" where the sacred scriptures, including the Bhagavad Gita and the Kirtan Ghosha (a collection of devotional songs), are placed. The Manikut or Monikut holds a sacred position and acts as the focal point of worship and reverence within the Namghar.

The Manikut or Monikut is adorned with flowers, incense, and other auspicious items, reflecting the devotion and reverence of the followers. Prayers, hymns, and devotional songs are chanted and sung around the Manikut or Monikut, creating an atmosphere of deep devotion and fostering a spiritual connection among the worshipers.

Importance of Namghar & Manikut or Monikut in Assamese Culture & Spiritual Heritage

Namghars and their Manikuts/Monikuts play an integral role in Assamese society, promoting communal harmony, spiritual growth, and cultural preservation. They serve as important centers for religious and social gatherings, fostering a sense of community and collective worship.

The Namghar tradition is deeply rooted in Assamese culture, reflecting the values of devotion, community, and the transmission of religious teachings. It continues to hold a significant place in the hearts of the people, preserving and promoting the rich cultural and spiritual heritage of Assam.
