= Kashmira Kakati =

Indian biologist and zoologist

Dr. Kashmira Kakati
- Education: Wildlife Institute of India, Dehradun, Wildlife Research Group, University of Cambridge
- Known for: Wild cats discovery
- Scientific career
- Fields: Biologist, Zoologist

Kashmira Kakati is a wildlife biologist and environmental activist working the North Eastern forests of India. In 2010, she announced the discovery of the presence of seven species of wild cats in the Jeypore-Dehing forests in Assam. Her work using camera traps to find wild cats was featured in the first episode of the BBC documentary Lost Land of the Tiger (2010).

== Education ==
Kakati graduated from the Wildlife Institute of India, Dehradun. She pursued her doctorate research on gibbons in Assam as part of the Wildlife Research Group, University of Cambridge. As part of her schooling she attend the Lawrence School Sanawar in the Simla Hills, India.

== Career ==
Kakati's doctoral research was on the hoolock gibbons of Dehing Patkai Wildlife Sanctuary. While performing this research, she became curious about the predator tracks that she kept finding on the grounds of the lowlands. This interest led to her work with cats.

In 2007-2009 Kakati and her team set up 30 digital camera traps in the Jeypore-Dehing lowland evergreen forests of Assam during which her team recorded seven species of cats and other rare forest animals. The research found 7 cat species in a 354-square-mile (570-square-kilometer) range—the highest diversity of cat species yet photographed in a single area. In 2012-2015, she studied mammal occurrence in a forest and swidden agriculture matrix in the Balpakram area of Meghalaya state, India, documenting 51 species of mammals, among which were 5 species of cats.

Kakati's research was supported by the Assam Forest Department and funded by the Critical Ecosystem Partnership Fund (CEPF), the Wildlife Conservation Society–India Program and the Rufford Small Grants Foundation, United Kingdom.

== Areas of work ==
Kakati's area of work includes wildlife conservation, species diversity, biodiversity monitoring and animal ecology.

In 2011, Kakati authored a report critical of Indian government plans to build a highway through a wildlife sanctuary. Two years later, it was still "the only known impact study" for this 99 km road project connecting India to Burma.

In 2014, Kakati filed a petition seeking legal protection for the elephant corridors under the Environment Protection Act. She alleged that the state government allowed Indian Oil Corporation Limited (IOCL) to construct an oil dispatch terminal in the Golai elephant corridor in violation of environment laws. According to Kakati's petition, around 295 elephants use the two corridors to migrate from one end to the other of the reserved forest which is also home to over 40 species of mammals and 19 carnivores.
