= Gohpur Assembly constituency =

Constituency of the Assam legislative assembly in India

Gohpur
- Constituency No. 72 for the Assam Legislative Assembly

Constituency details
- Country: India
- Region: Northeast India
- State: Assam
- District: Biswanath
- Lok Sabha constituency: Sonitpur
- Established: 1951
- Reservation: None

Gohpur Assembly constituency is one of the 126 assembly constituencies of Assam Legislative Assembly. Gohpur forms part of the Sonitpur Lok Sabha constituency.

== Members of Legislative Assembly ==
Election	Member	Party affiliation
1952	Gahan Chandra Goswami	Indian National Congress
1957	Bishnulal Upadhyaya	Indian National Congress
1962	Bishnulal Upadhyaya	Indian National Congress
1967	Bishnulal Upadhyaya	Indian National Congress
1972	Ram Chandra Sarmah	Samyukta Socialist Party
1978	Ram Chandra Sarmah	Janata Party
1985	Ganesh Kutum	Independent
1991	Kosheswar Barua	Indian National Congress
1996	Ganesh Kutum	Asom Gana Parishad
2001	Ripun Bora	Indian National Congress
2006	Ripun Bora	Indian National Congress
2011	Monika Bora	Indian National Congress
2016	Utpal Borah	Bharatiya Janata Party
2021	Utpal Borah	Bharatiya Janata Party

== Election results ==
=== 2026 ===
2026 Assam Legislative Assembly election: Gohpur
Party	Candidate	Votes	%	±%
BJP	Utpal Borah	96582	65.72	
INC	Sankar Jyoti Kutum	43860	29.85	
UPPL	NITYANANDA BASUMATARY	3204	2.18	
NOTA	NOTA	1873	1.27	
Margin of victory		52722		
Turnout		146954		
Rejected ballots				
Registered electors				
BJP hold		Swing		

=== 2016 ===
2016 Assam Legislative Assembly election: Gohpur
Party	Candidate	Votes	%	±%
BJP	Utpal Borah	85,424	58.26	
INC	Monika Bora	56,489	38.53	
CPI(ML)L	Halan Purtti	1,189	0.81	
Independent	Sabir Narzary	967	0.66	
Independent	Deben Saikia	928	0.63	
NOTA	None of the above	1,621	1.10	
Majority		28,935	19.73	
Turnout		1,46,618		
Registered electors				
BJP gain from INC		Swing		

== See also ==
- Biswanath district
- List of constituencies of Assam Legislative Assembly
