= Kalabari (Assam) =

Kalabari Kalapgram, Kalapurnagram
- Village
- Location in Assam, India Kalabari (India)
- Coordinates: 26.84985°N 92.56785°E
- Country: India
- State: Assam
- District: Biswanath Chariali
- District Subdivision: Gohpur

Government
  - Body: Gram panchayat

Population (2001)
  - Total: 27,052

Languages
  - Official: Assamese
- Time zone: UTC+5:30 (IST)
- PIN: 784178
- Vehicle registration: AS 12

Kalabari is a locality in the tehsil/ mandal of Pub-Chaiduar in the Biswanath district of the Indian state of Assam.

== Geography ==
Kalabari is around 311 km from state capital Dispur. It is surrounded by: Lower Arunachal Pradesh, Rangajan on its north; Hawajan, Ghuriya gaon and Pisola on its east; Brahmaputra river on its south; Dubia River to its west.

Kalabari has five panchayats, East Kalabari, West Kalabari, Kalabari, North Kalabari and South Kalabari. The population was 27,052 according to population census 2011.

=== Villages ===
- Gagal Gaon
- Uttar Pahukota
- Dakshin Pahukota
- Mikir Bora Chuk
- Kumarkota
- Aunibari
- Sakura
- Borapathar
- Digholibari
- Pub Kalita Gaon
- Konch Gaon
- Kukurasuwa
- Dola-Doloni
- Kamdewal
- Borachuk
- Solamora
- Kamdewal
- Majikuchi
- Borbheti
- Khetroati
- Kalmouguri
- 2 No. Sakura
- Jogora Doloni

== Etymology ==
Many tales describe the origin of the name Kalabari:

During the reign of Chutia King Dharmanarayan, Kalabari was the state capital. King Dharmanarayan established projects for local development. The King was happy to see that the projects were completed on time with their work and art (Karma and Kala in Assamese). Hence, King Dharmanarayan kept the name Kala-purna gram (meaning artful village) or Kalap gram. Over time, these words transformed into Kalabri.

== Tribes and community ==
People of Kalabari are either Mongolians or Aryans. Mongolian tribes include Deori, Chutia, Ahom, Bodo, Karbi, Nishi, Nepali, Brahmins, Goshai, kaibatra, Mahanta, Koch, Kalita, Sut, Motok and Mishing.

== Kalabari Bihu ==
Bihu of Dologuri is known across Assam. In 1680, Sargodeu (King in Ahom Dynasty) Rajeshwar Singha under the supervision of Kirtichandra Borbaruah built a temple at Dologuri Satra (Kalabari Dakhinpat Satra). From the starting of Chot month, people started practicing Bihu in the field of this Dologuri Satra. After the start of Assamese New Year in Bohag month, the field filled with local and non-local people for Bihu celebrations. The festival ends around the 8th or 9th of Bohag. On the last day, young girls play bihu under a big tree in an open field and offer blessings. This is called Bihu Bondha or Bihu Uruwa.

Another attraction of Dologuri Bihu is the Hepu (dyspnea or shortness of breath) performance. The birth of Hepu is said to be due to the pressure of domestic problem some people are kept away from Bihu, later on due to desire of the uncontrollable mind, they come running for long-distance causing shortness of breath or dyspnea which are being used as a peculiar form of Bihu song which is called ‘Hepu’, indigenous only to Dologuri Bihu.

After Indian independence, over time Bihu became transformed. The bihu under the tree of Dologuri became Bihu mela. From 1963 competition among invited bihu teams started. Taking Dologuri as an example, many Bihu melas were organized in other parts of Kalabari. In this regard, the Bihu mela organized in 1968 by Sadou Kalabari Bohagi Mel is well known. Many Bihu teams were formed . Dologuri, Shilpi Shainik, Mornoiporiya, Pasuwa, Dhumuha, and Borluitporiya. The Bihu teams of Kalabari established themselves in national and international competition. In the 1995 Madras South Asian games, Kalabari represented Assam and the north-east in the opening and closing ceremonies. By accumulating artists from various Bihu teams, the Kamdev Satra team performed many times outside Assam.

== Historical monuments ==
=== Basudev Doul ===
Basudev Doul is a doul that was constructed during the reign of Ahom king Rajeshwar Singha, as recorded by historian Benudhar Sharma. This doul lies near the Khator gaon (Borachuk), which falls under the Gohpur Revenue circle. Kirti Chandra Borboruah supervised the doul's construction.

== Education ==
Kalabari hosts several educational institutes, including:

- Kalabari College ( Estd. 1993 ) - With an ambition of giving higher education to those educationally deprived people of Kalabari, a few humble citizens of this region established this college in 1992, with the support of the neighboring population. Since its inception, it has produced students who have excelling in a variety of fields. Now it is affiliated to Gauhati University under UGC:2f status.
- Chaiduar B.Ed College
- Kalabari M.V. School ( Estd. 1903 )
- Kalabari Higher Secondary School ( Estd. 1944 )
- Kalabari Girls High School ( Estd. )
- Pachim Kalabari Higher Secondary School (Estd. )
- Dakshin kalabari Higher Secondary School (Estd. )
- Kasturba M.V. School
- Kasturba High School
- Rupjyoti High School
- Dilapakhara High School
- Sakura High School
- Kalabari Sankardev Sishu Vidya Niketon ( Estd. 1997)
