= Gohpur =

- Town
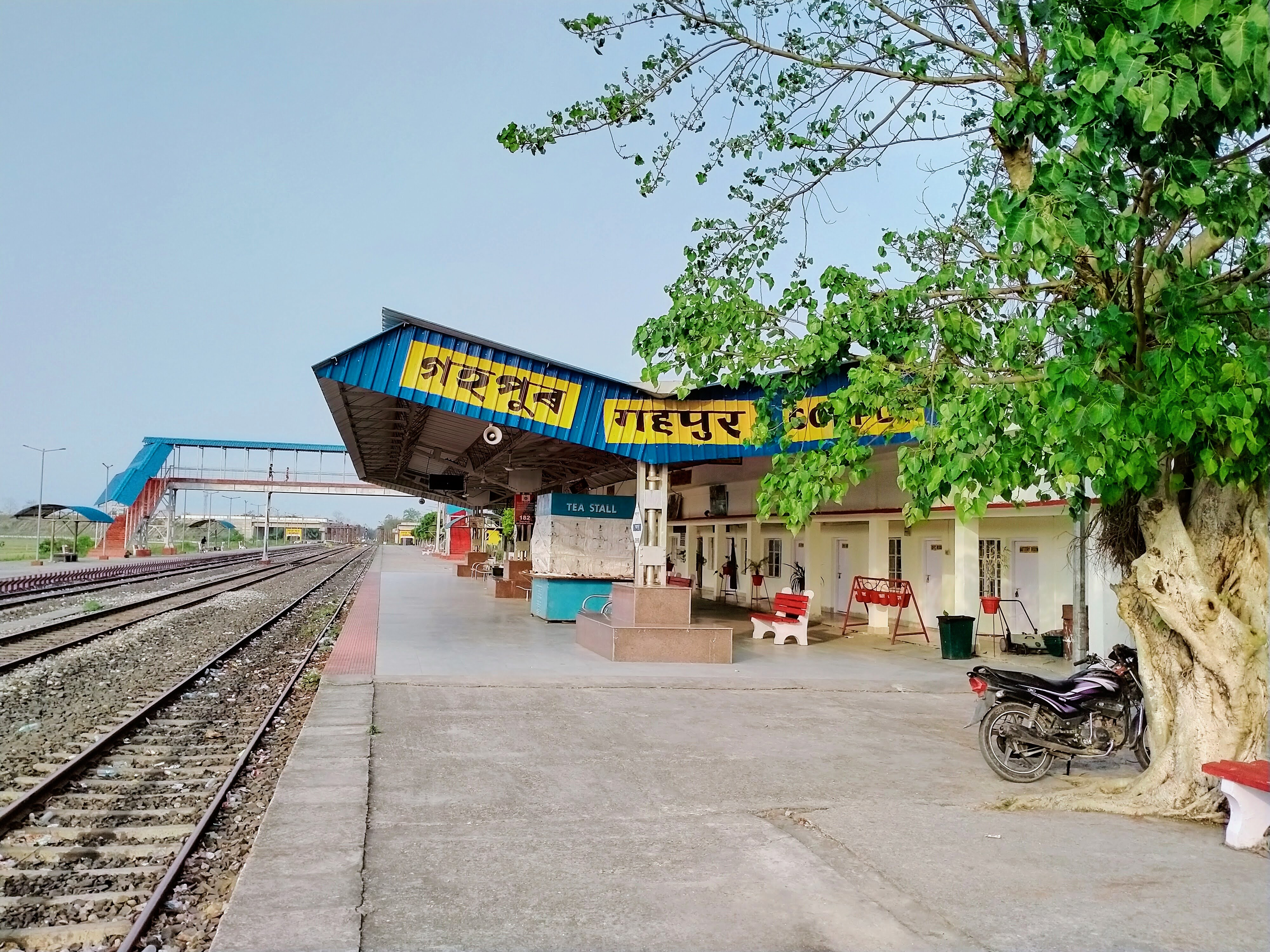
- Gohpur railway station

- Location in Assam, India Gohpur (India)
- Coordinates: 26.88°N 93.63°E
- Country: India
- State: Assam
- District: Biswanath
- Established: 26 January 2000

Government
  - Civil SDO: Lukumoni Borah, Assam Civil Service
  - MLA: Utpal Borah (BJP)
- Elevation: 269 m (883 ft)

Population (2011)
  - Total: 265,867

Languages
  - Official: Assamese
- Time zone: UTC+5:30 (IST)
- Postal code: 784168
- ISO 3166 code: IN-AS
- Vehicle registration: AS-32

Gohpur (IPA: ˌgəʊəˈpʊə) is a town and headquarters of the Gohpur sub-division in Biswanath district in the Indian state of Assam. It is a historical place in Assam where the famous freedom fighter Kanaklata Barua was born. The current MLA from the Gohpur constituency is Utpal Borah and Lukumoni Borah ACS is the current Sub Divisional Officer (Civil) or Civil SDO of Gohpur.

== Geography ==
Gohpur is located at 26.88°N 93.63°E. It has an average elevation of 269 m (883 feet). Guwahati and Gohpur are 299 km by road and 266 km by train; the aerial distance is 208 km. Gohpur also connects Itanagar, the capital of Arunachal Pradesh, via NH 15. Itanagar is only 31 km from Gohpur via NH 52A. It also connects to Majuli and Jorhat by small ships through the Brahmaputra.

== Demographics ==
As of 2001 India census, Gohpur had a population of 121,380. Males constitute 53% of the population and females 47%. Gohpur has an average literacy rate of 72%, higher than the national average of 59.5%: male literacy is 77%, and female literacy is 66%. In Gohpur, 13% of the population is under 6 years of age.

== Politics ==
Gohpur is part of Tezpur Lok Sabha constituency. The Gohpur Assembly Constituency is one of the largest in Assam, spreading from Buroi to Hawajan along the North Bank of Assam. Utpal Borah is the MLA from Gohpur and Ranjit Dutta is the MP of Sonitpur Lok Sabha constituency.

== Education ==
Gohpur has several educational institutions including Chaiduar College, Gohpur Collegiate Adarsha High School, Gohpur Girls High School, Gohpur High School, Madhya Chaiduar Higher Secondary School, Nehru High School, and Jyoti Agarwala High School.

== Notable people ==
- Kanaklata Barua, freedom fighter
- Nomal Chandra Borah, founder GNRC hospitals
